= 2014–15 FC Barcelona Bàsquet season =

Spanish basketball club season

FC Barcelona
2014–15 season
- Chairman: Josep Maria Bartomeu
- Head coach: Xavier Pascual
- Arena: Palau Blaugrana
- Euroleague: Quarterfinalist
- ACB: Runners-up
- Copa del Rey: Runners-up
- Supercopa: Runners-up
- Highest home attendance: 8,529 vs Real Madrid (2 April 2015)
- Average home attendance: 6,721 (in EuroLeague); 4,868 (in Liga ACB)
- Biggest win: 101–53 vs La Bruixa d'Or Manresa (1 February 2015)
- Biggest defeat: 97–73 vs Real Madrid (5 February 2015)
| Home | Away |

The 2014–15 season of FC Barcelona Bàsquet was the 51st season of the basketball club in the highest division of Spanish basketball and the 24th season in the Liga ACB.

In the 2014–15 season, FC Barcelona competed in the Liga ACB, the Supercopa, the Copa del Rey and the EuroLeague.

== Players ==
=== Roster ===
Note: Flags indicate national team eligibility at FIBA-sanctioned events. Players may hold other non-FIBA nationalities not displayed.

FC Barcelona roster
Players
Coaches

| Pos. | No. | Nat. | Name | Ht. | Wt. | Age |
|---|---|---|---|---|---|---|
| PF | 5 | (United States) | Doellman, Justin | 2.08 m (6 ft 10 in) | 102 kg (225 lb) | 30 – 3 February 1985 |
| G/F | 8 | (Croatia) | Hezonja, Mario | 2.02 m (6 ft 8 in) | 91 kg (201 lb) | 20 – 25 February 1995 |
| PG | 9 | (Brazil) | Huertas, Marcelinho | 1.91 m (6 ft 3 in) | 84 kg (185 lb) | 32 – 25 May 1983 |
| SG | 10 | (Spain) | Abrines, Álex | 1.98 m (6 ft 6 in) | 86 kg (190 lb) | 21 – 1 August 1993 |
| SG | 11 | (Spain) | Navarro, Juan Carlos (C) | 1.92 m (6 ft 4 in) | 90.5 kg (200 lb) | 35 – 13 June 1980 |
| PG | 13 | (Czech Republic) | Satoranský, Tomáš | 1.99 m (6 ft 6 in) | 86 kg (190 lb) | 23 – 30 October 1991 |
| SF | 20 | (Sweden) | Eriksson, Marcus | 2.00 m (6 ft 7 in) | 89 kg (196 lb) | 21 – 5 December 1993 |
| C | 21 | (Germany) | Pleiß, Tibor | 2.16 m (7 ft 1 in) | 122 kg (269 lb) | 25 – 2 November 1989 |
| SF | 23 | (United States) | Thomas, Deshaun | 2.01 m (6 ft 7 in) | 98 kg (216 lb) | 23 – 28 August 1991 |
| SG | 24 | (United States) | Oleson, Brad | 1.91 m (6 ft 3 in) | 90.5 kg (200 lb) | 32 – 11 April 1983 |
| G | 25 | (France) | Jackson, Edwin | 1.91 m (6 ft 3 in) | 91 kg (201 lb) | 25 – 18 September 1989 |
| C | 30 | (Poland) | Lampe, Maciej | 2.11 m (6 ft 11 in) | 125 kg (276 lb) | 30 – 5 February 1985 |
| SF | 34 | (Slovenia) | Nachbar, Boštjan | 2.07 m (6 ft 9 in) | 102 kg (225 lb) | 34 – 3 July 1980 |
| C | 44 | (Croatia) | Tomić, Ante | 2.18 m (7 ft 2 in) | 120 kg (265 lb) | 28 – 17 February 1987 |

Head coach

- (Spain) Xavier Pascual

Assistant coach(es)

- (Spain) Agustín Julbé
- (Spain) Iñigo Zorzano
- (Spain) David García

Legend

- (C) Team captain
- Injured

- Roster

=== Depth chart ===
| Pos. | Starting 5 | Bench 1 | Bench 2 | Bench 3 |
|---|---|---|---|---|
| C | Ante Tomić | Tibor Pleiß | Emir Sulejmanović ‡ |
| PF | Justin Doellman * | Maciej Lampe † |
| SF | Álex Abrines † | Boštjan Nachbar | Deshaun Thomas * | Marcus Eriksson ‡ |
| SG | Juan Carlos Navarro † | Brad Oleson † | Mario Hezonja ‡ | Edwin Jackson |
| PG | Tomáš Satoranský | Marcelinho Huertas | Ludvig Håkanson ‡ |

Notes: Blue † – homegrown player; Red * – overseas player; Green ‡ – youth player

=== In ===
| No. | Pos. | Nat. | Name | Age | Moving from | | Type | Ends | Transfer fee | Date | Source |
|---|---|---|---|---|---|---|---|---|---|---|---|
| 5 | PF | (United States) | Justin Doellman | 29 | Valencia Basket | (Spain) | Free agency | 2015 | – | 9 July 2014 | |
| 13 | SG | (Czech Republic) | Tomáš Satoranský | 22 | Cajasol Sevilla | (Spain) | Free agency | 2016 | – | 11 July 2014 | |
| 21 | C | (Germany) | Tibor Pleiß | 24 | Laboral Kutxa Baskonia | (Spain) | Transfer | | €600,000 | 2014 | |
| 23 | C | (United States) | Deshaun Thomas | 23 | JSF Nanterre | (France) | Free agency | | – | 2014 | |
| 20 | SG | (Sweden) | Marcus Eriksson | 20 | La Bruixa d'Or | (Spain) | Free agency | | – | 2014 | |

=== Out ===
| No. | Pos. | Nat. | Name | Age | Moving to | | Type | Transfer fee | Date | Source |
|---|---|---|---|---|---|---|---|---|---|---|
| 6 | C | (United States) | Joey Dorsey | 30 | Houston Rockets | (United States) | Free agency | – | 15 July 2014 | |
| 16 | SF | (Greece) | Kostas Papanikolaou | 24 | Houston Rockets | (United States) | Free agency | - | | |
| 14 | PF | (Montenegro) | Marko Todorović | 22 | Bilbao Basket | (Spain) | Free agency | - | | |
| 8 | SG | (Spain) | Victor Sada | 30 | MoraBanc Andorra | (Andorra) | Free agency | - | | |
| 0 | G | (United States) | Jacob Pullen | 24 | Baloncesto Sevilla | (Spain) | Free agency | - | | |

Last updated: 23 November 2014.
Source: Eurobasket.com

== Pre-season and friendlies ==
=== Friendly matches ===
| 7 September 2014 Torneig BBVA | FC Barcelona | 86–77 | FIATC Joventut | Sant Julià de Vilatorta |
| 12:30 |
| | | | | Arena: Pavelló Esportiu Municipal |

| 14 September 2014 Torneo Córdoba Ciudad Europea | FC Barcelona | 91–85 | Baloncesto Sevilla | Córdoba |
| 12:00 | Scoring by quarter: 17–18, 21–24, 25–13, 28–30 |
| | Pts: Doellman 18 | | Pts: Hernangómez 13 | Arena: Palacio Vistalegre; Attendance: 2,000; Referees: Antonio Conde, Benjamín García |

| 20 September 2014 Appart City Cup | ASVEL Villeurbanne | 80–76 | FC Barcelona | Montpellier |
| 18:00 | Scoring by quarter: 20–16, 29–16, 12–20, 19–24 |
| | Pts: Green 18 | Report | Pts: Lampe 14 | Arena: Sud de France Arena; Referees: Bretagne, Hamzaoui, Benmerzouk |

| 21 September 2014 Appart City Cup | Pau-Orthez | 57–93 | FC Barcelona | Castelnau-le-Lez |
| 18:00 | Scoring by quarter: 6–25, 14–29, 23–14, 14–25 |
| | Pts: Robinson 18 | Report | Pts: Pleiß 16 | Arena: Palais des Sports |

=== Lliga Catalana de Bàsquet ===
| 1 October 2014 Semifinal | FC Barcelona (Catalonia) | 82–66 | (Catalonia) La Bruixa d'Or Manresa | La Seu d'Urgell |
| 21:00 | Scoring by quarter: 20–21, 28–13, 18–14, 16–18 |
| | Pts: Doellman 15; Rebs: Pleiss, Tomić 5 Asts: Huertas 7 PIR: Doellman 20 | Boxscore | Pts: three players 10; Rebs: Hall, Charitopoulos 4 Asts: Bivià 4 PIR: Ogilvy 20 | Arena: Palau d'Esports; Referees: Perea, Oyón, Aliaga |

| 2 October 2014 Final | FC Barcelona (Catalonia) | 104–93 | MoraBanc Andorra | La Seu d'Urgell |
| 21:00 | Scoring by quarter: 18–18, 33–34, 26–24, 27–17 |
| | Pts: Doellman 27; Rebs: Tomić 9 Asts: Huertas, Tomić 7 PIR: Tomić 31 | Boxscore | Pts: Martínez 14; Rebs: Gomes 6 Asts: Sada 4 PIR: Sada 17 | Arena: Palau d'Esports; Referees: Perea, Girao, Munar |

== Competitions ==
=== Overview ===
| Competition | First match | Last match | Starting round | Final position | Record | | | | | | | |
| Competition | First match | Last match | Starting round | Final position | Pld | W | D | L | PF | PA | PD | Win % |
|---|---|---|---|---|---|---|---|---|---|---|---|---|
| Liga ACB | 4 October 2014 | 24 June 2015 | Round 1 | Runners-up | 44 | 30 | | 14 | 3,609 | 3,222 | +387 | 68.18 |
| EuroLeague | 17 October 2014 | 23 April 2015 | Round 1 | Quarterfinals | 28 | 21 | | 7 | 2,285 | 2,077 | +208 | 75.00 |
| Copa del Rey | 19 February 2015 | 22 February 2015 | Quarterfinals | Runners-up | 3 | 2 | | 1 | 243 | 236 | +7 | 66.67 |
| Supercopa | 26 September 2014 | 27 September 2014 | Semifinals | Runners-up | 2 | 1 | | 1 | 173 | 165 | +8 | 50.00 |
| Total | | | | | 77 | 54 | 0 | 23 | 6,310 | 5,700 | +610 | 70.13 |

Last updated: 17 October 2025
Source: Competitions

=== Liga ACB ===
==== League table ====
| Pos | Team | Pld | W | L | PF | PA | PD | Qualification or relegation |
|---|---|---|---|---|---|---|---|---|
| 1 | Real Madrid | 34 | 27 | 7 | 2903 | 2640 | +263 | Qualification to playoffs |
| 2 | FC Barcelona | 34 | 25 | 9 | 2806 | 2455 | +351 | Qualification to playoffs |
| 3 | Unicaja | 34 | 25 | 9 | 2644 | 2490 | +154 | Qualification to playoffs |
| 4 | Dominion Bilbao Basket | 34 | 20 | 14 | 2559 | 2514 | +45 | Qualification to playoffs |
| 5 | Valencia Basket | 34 | 20 | 14 | 2817 | 2675 | +142 | Qualification to playoffs |

Source: ACB

==== Results summary ====
| Overall | | | | | | Home | | | | | Away | | | | |
| Pld | W | L | PF | PA | PD | W | L | PF | PA | PD | W | L | PF | PA | PD |
|---|---|---|---|---|---|---|---|---|---|---|---|---|---|---|---|
| 34 | 25 | 9 | 2806 | 2455 | +351 | 16 | 1 | 1460 | 1202 | +258 | 9 | 8 | 1346 | 1253 | +93 |

Source: Competitive matches

==== Results by round ====
| Round | 1 | 2 | 3 | 4 | 5 | 6 | 7 | 8 | 9 | 10 | 11 | 12 | 13 | 14 | 15 | 16 | 17 | 18 | 19 | 20 | 21 | 22 | 23 | 24 | 25 | 26 | 27 | 28 | 29 | 30 | 31 | 32 | 33 | 34 |
|---|---|---|---|---|---|---|---|---|---|---|---|---|---|---|---|---|---|---|---|---|---|---|---|---|---|---|---|---|---|---|---|---|---|---|
| Ground | H | A | H | A | H | A | H | A | H | A | H | A | H | A | A | H | A | A | H | H | A | H | A | H | A | H | A | A | H | A | H | H | A | H |
| Result | W | W | W | W | L | W | W | W | W | L | W | L | W | L | L | W | W | L | W | W | W | W | L | W | L | W | W | L | W | W | W | W | W | W |
| Position | 2 | 2 | 1 | 1 | 3 | 2 | 2 | 2 | 2 | 3 | 2 | 3 | 2 | 2 | 5 | 5 | 4 | 5 | 5 | 4 | 3 | 3 | 3 | 3 | 3 | 3 | 3 | 3 | 3 | 3 | 3 | 3 | 2 | 2 |

Source: Competitive matches
A = Away; H = Home; W = Win; L = Loss; R = Rest

==== Matches ====
| 4 October 2014 1 | FC Barcelona | 87–65 | Laboral Kutxa | Barcelona |
| 20:45 | Scoring by quarter: 24–12, 21–25, 13–12, 29–16 |
| | Pts: Abrines 18; Rebs: Doellman, Pleiß 7 Asts: Huertas 4 PIR: Abrines 21 | Boxscore | Pts: Bertāns 16; Rebs: Iverson 6 Asts: Heurtel 5 PIR: Bertāns 27 | Arena: Palau Blaugrana; Attendance: 4,274; Referees: Vicente Bultó, Carlos Peruga, Juan José Martínez Díez |

| 14 October 2014 2 | La Bruixa d'Or Manresa | 69–88 | FC Barcelona | Manresa |
| 21:00 | Scoring by quarter: 26–22, 12–19, 17–25, 14–22 |
| | Pts: Grimau 16; Rebs: Samuels 9 Asts: Bivià 4 PIR: Grimau 20 | Boxscore | Pts: Huertas 17; Rebs: Tomić 11; Asts: three players 4 PIR: Tomić 26 | Arena: Nou Congost; Attendance: 3,700; Referees: Óscar Perea, Juan Luis Redondo, Anna Cardús |

| 19 October 2014 3 | FC Barcelona | 80–61 | Herbalife Gran Canaria | Barcelona |
| 18:00 | Scoring by quarter: 28–17, 12–11, 19–18, 21–15 |
| | Pts: Doellman 14; Rebs: Doellman 6 Asts: Huertas 7 PIR: Doellman 21 | Boxscore | Pts: Báez 14; Rebs: Tavares 11; Asts: Oliver 4 PIR: Báez 17 | Arena: Palau Blaugrana; Attendance: 3,916; Referees: Juan Carlos García González, Carlos Sánchez Monserrat, Victor Mas |

| 26 October 2014 4 | Gipuzkoa Basket | 43–57 | FC Barcelona | San Sebastián |
| 12:15 | Scoring by quarter: 4–6, 6–22, 18–15, 15–14 |
| | Pts: Díez 10; Rebs: Díez 10; Asts: Jordan, Pinero 3 PIR: Díez 19 | Boxscore | Pts: Tomić 10; Rebs: Tomić 8 Asts: Huertas 6 PIR: Satoranský 15 | Arena: Donostia Arena; Attendance: 6,252; Referees: Daniel Hierrezuelo, Miguel Ángel Pérez Niz, Jacobo Rial |

| 2 November 2014 5 | FC Barcelona | 82–83 | FIATC Joventut | Barcelona |
| 12:30 | Scoring by quarter: 25–18, 18–29, 17–17, 22–19 |
| | Pts: Tomić 17; Rebs: Tomić 10; Asts: Oleson, Satoranský 5 PIR: Tomić 22 | Boxscore | Pts: Savané 20; Rebs: Suton 9 Asts: three players 4 PIR: Savané 20 | Arena: Palau Blaugrana; Attendance: 4,897; Referees: Antonio Conde, Fernando Calatrava, Andrés Fernández Sánchez |

| 9 November 2014 6 | Iberostar Tenerife | 66–80 | FC Barcelona | San Cristóbal de La Laguna |
| 13:30 | Scoring by quarter: 18–22, 10–22, 19–18, 19–18 |
| | Pts: Sikma 26; Rebs: Sikma 7 Asts: San Miguel 5 PIR: Sikma 32 | Boxscore | Pts: Lampe 20; Rebs: Tomić 6 Asts: Doellman 5 PIR: Lampe 21 | Arena: Santiago Martín; Attendance: 4,467; Referees: Benjamín Jiménez, Carlos Cortés, Rafael Serrano |

| 16 November 2014 7 | FC Barcelona | 76–57 | Valencia Basket | Barcelona |
| 17:30 | Scoring by quarter: 19–17, 22–8, 13–15, 22–17 |
| | Pts: Lampe 20; Rebs: Lampe 11; Asts: Huertas, Satoranský 3 PIR: Lampe 31 | Boxscore | Pts: Ribas 14; Rebs: Harangody, van Rossom 5 Asts: Ribas 5 PIR: Ribas 20 | Arena: Palau Blaugrana; Attendance: 4,267; Referees: Daniel Hierrezuelo, Luis Miguel Castillo, Rubén Sánchez Mohedas |

| 23 November 2014 8 | Montakit Fuenlabrada | 64–79 | FC Barcelona | Fuenlabrada |
| 12:45 | Scoring by quarter: 12–23, 17–20, 16–19, 19–17 |
| | Pts: Clark, Miso 15; Rebs: Diagne 11; Asts: Miso 3 PIR: Miso 22 | Boxscore | Pts: Tomić 23; Rebs: Tomić 7 Asts: Huertas 8 PIR: Tomić 28 | Arena: Fernando Martín; Attendance: 4,649; Referees: Miguel Ángel Pérez Pérez, Carlos Peruga, Sergio Manuel |

| 30 November 2014 9 | FC Barcelona | 90–70 | UCAM Murcia CB | Barcelona |
| 12:30 | Scoring by quarter: 17–15, 25–13, 26–12, 22–30 |
| | Pts: Abrines 24; Rebs: Pleiß 9 Asts: Huertas 7 PIR: Abrines 27 | Boxscore | Pts: Antelo 12; Rebs: Lima 10; Asts: Neto 7 PIR: Antelo 18 | Arena: Palau Blaugrana; Attendance: 4,777; Referees: José Antonio Martín Bertrán, José Ramón García Ortiz, Antonio Sacristán |

| 7 December 2014 10 | Baloncesto Sevilla | 85–74 | FC Barcelona | Seville |
| 12:15 | Scoring by quarter: 23–19, 20–17, 22–18, 20–20 |
| | Pts: Hernangómez 29; Rebs: Hernangómez 13; Asts: Radičević 4 PIR: Hernangómez 43 | Boxscore | Pts: Huertas 17; Rebs: Tomić 10; Asts: Huertas 9 PIR: Huertas 24 | Arena: San Pablo; Attendance: 3,466; Referees: Vicente Bultó, Lluís Guirao, Juan José Martínez Díez |

| 14 December 2014 11 | FC Barcelona | 90–67 | CAI Zaragoza | Barcelona |
| 12:15 | Scoring by quarter: 23–16, 24–18, 22–21, 21–12 |
| | Pts: Pleiß 15; Rebs: Pleiß 11; Asts: Huertas 7 PIR: Pleiß 29 | Boxscore | Pts: Jelovac 15; Rebs: Jelovac, Tomàs 5 Asts: three players 3 PIR: Jelovac 18 | Arena: Palau Blaugrana; Attendance: 4,026; Referees: Carlos Peruga, Francisco Araña, Juan de Dios Oyón |

| 21 December 2014 12 | Movistar Estudiantes | 102–96 | FC Barcelona | Madrid |
| 20:15 | Scoring by quarter: 21–31, 29–26, 21–13, 31–26 |
| | Pts: Van Lacke 25; Rebs: Rabaseda 6 Asts: Salgado 6 PIR: van Lacke 33 | Boxscore | Pts: Doellman 25; Rebs: Doellman, Pleiß 4 Asts: Huertas, Tomić 6 PIR: Doellman 29 | Arena: WiZink Center; Attendance: 11,800; Referees: Antonio Conde, Miguel Ángel Pérez Niz, Jordi Aliaga |

| 28 December 2014 13 | FC Barcelona | 76–68 | Real Madrid | Barcelona |
| 19:00 | Scoring by quarter: 24–22, 23–18, 11–15, 18–13 |
| | Pts: Doellman, Tomić 12; Rebs: Tomić 8 Asts: three players 3 PIR: Tomić 16 | Boxscore | Pts: Mačiulis 14; Rebs: Bourousis, Fernández 5 Asts: Fernández 4 PIR: Fernández 13 | Arena: Palau Blaugrana; Attendance: 7,261; Referees: Emilio Pérez Pizarro, Carlos Cortés, Jorge Martínez |

| 30 December 2014 14 | Rio Monbus Obradoiro | 79–67 | FC Barcelona | Santiago de Compostela |
| 20:30 | Scoring by quarter: 15–15, 17–20, 21–22, 26–10 |
| | Pts: Kleber 23; Rebs: Triguero 6 Asts: Cárdenas, Pozas 4 PIR: Kleber 27 | Boxscore | Pts: Doellman 17; Rebs: Doellman, Satoranský 6 Asts: Doellman 4 PIR: Pleiß 17 | Arena: Fontes do Sar; Attendance: 5,582; Referees: Juan Carlos García González, José Ramón García Ortiz, Victor Mas |

| 4 January 2015 15 | Dominion Bilbao Basket | 73–67 | FC Barcelona | Bilbao |
| 18:00 | Scoring by quarter: 20–23, 17–15, 16–16, 20–13 |
| | Pts: Colom 21; Rebs: Todorović 9 Asts: Colom 6 PIR: Colom 26 | Boxscore | Pts: Thomas 15; Rebs: Tomić 14; Asts: Huertas, Tomić 3 PIR: Tomić 22 | Arena: Bilbao Arena; Attendance: 10,014; Referees: Daniel Hierrezuelo, Francisco Araña, Andrés Fernández Sánchez |

| 11 January 2015 16 | FC Barcelona | 114–110(OT) | Unicaja | Barcelona |
| 12:30 | Scoring by quarter: 27–24, 25–21, 27–33, 20–21, Overtime: 15–11 |
| | Pts: three players 19; Rebs: Thomas, Tomić 7 Asts: Huertas 8 PIR: Huertas 27 | Boxscore | Pts: Toolson 25; Rebs: Golubović 6 Asts: Suárez 4 PIR: Toolson 24 | Arena: Palau Blaugrana; Attendance: 5,517; Referees: Benjamín Jiménez, Óscar Perea, Sergio Manuel |

| 18 January 2015 17 | MoraBanc Andorra | 56–71 | FC Barcelona | Andorra la Vella |
| 12:30 | Scoring by quarter: 12–12, 13–13, 18–28, 13–18 |
| | Pts: Bogris 18; Rebs: Ivanov 8 Asts: three players 3 PIR: Bogris 17 | Boxscore | Pts: Abrines 19; Rebs: Tomić 5 Asts: Huertas 8 PIR: Abrines 15 | Arena: Poliesportiu d'Andorra; Attendance: 4,370; Referees: José Antonio Martín Bertrán, Luis Miguel Castillo, Jacobo Rial |

| 25 January 2015 18 | Laboral Kutxa | 103–94 | FC Barcelona | Vitoria-Gasteiz |
| 12:40 | Scoring by quarter: 25–22, 23–16, 22–27, 33–29 |
| | Pts: Bertāns 19; Rebs: Iverson 8 Asts: James 5 PIR: San Emeterio 24 | Boxscore | Pts: Abrines, Satoranský 17; Rebs: Doellman 9 Asts: Huertas 6 PIR: Satoranský 22 | Arena: Buesa Arena; Attendance: 11,246; Referees: Antonio Conde, Carlos Sánchez Monserrat, Rubén Sánchez Mohedas |

| 1 February 2015 19 | FC Barcelona | 101–53 | La Bruixa d'Or Manresa | Barcelona |
| 12:30 | Scoring by quarter: 26–4, 27–9, 25–18, 23–22 |
| | Pts: Hezonja 24; Rebs: four players 5 Asts: Hezonja 6 PIR: Hezonja 29 | Boxscore | Pts: Fotu 20; Rebs: Šakić 5 Asts: White 5 PIR: Fotu 15 | Arena: Palau Blaugrana; Attendance: 5,333; Referees: Vicente Bultó, Miguel Ángel Pérez Niz, Victor Mas |

| 8 February 2015 20 | FC Barcelona | 87–79 | Iberostar Tenerife | Barcelona |
| 12:30 | Scoring by quarter: 21–21, 21–12, 20–18, 25–28 |
| | Pts: Nachbar 24; Rebs: Pleiß 9 Asts: Nachbar 4 PIR: Nachbar 23 | Boxscore | Pts: Lampropoulos 23; Rebs: Sikma 8 Asts: Sikma 4 PIR: Lampropoulos 21 | Arena: Palau Blaugrana; Attendance: 4,610; Referees: Óscar Perea, Jorge Martínez, Rafael Serrano |

| 15 February 2015 21 | FIATC Joventut | 61–99 | FC Barcelona | Badalona |
| 12:30 | Scoring by quarter: 12–19, 14–26, 12–25, 23–29 |
| | Pts: Mallet 12; Rebs: Suton 4 Asts: Vidal 2 PIR: Suárez 11 | Boxscore | Pts: Doellman, Hezonja 16; Rebs: Tomić 9 Asts: Huertas 9 PIR: Hezonja 18 | Arena: Olímpic de Badalona; Attendance: 8,057; Referees: José Antonio Martín Bertrán, Carlos Peruga, Juan José Martínez Díez |

| 1 March 2015 22 | FC Barcelona | 71–58 | Gipuzkoa Basket | Barcelona |
| 12:15 | Scoring by quarter: 18–17, 16–19, 27–11, 10–11 |
| | Pts: Abrines 16; Rebs: Pleiß 10; Asts: Satoranský 3 PIR: Abrines 23 | Boxscore | Pts: Pinero 14; Rebs: Hanley 10; Asts: Jordan 4 PIR: Doblas 18 | Arena: Palau Blaugrana; Attendance: 4,358; Referees: Juan Carlos Arteaga, Francisco Araña, Anna Cardús |

| 8 March 2015 23 | Herbalife Gran Canaria | 76–70 | FC Barcelona | Las Palmas |
| 13:30 | Scoring by quarter: 15–17, 21–25, 17–15, 23–13 |
| | Pts: Oliver 17; Rebs: Tavares 11; Asts: five players 2 PIR: Tavares 20 | Boxscore | Pts: Huertas 16; Rebs: Doellman 8 Asts: Oleson 4 PIR: Doellman 19 | Arena: Gran Canaria Arena; Attendance: 8,472; Referees: Antonio Conde, Vicente Bultó, Rubén Sánchez Mohedas |

| 15 March 2015 24 | FC Barcelona | 88–82 | Montakit Fuenlabrada | Barcelona |
| 12:30 | Scoring by quarter: 22–18, 20–17, 23–17, 23–30 |
| | Pts: Doellman 19; Rebs: Tomić 9 Asts: Satoranský 8 PIR: Satoranský 21 | Boxscore | Pts: Panko 21; Rebs: Panko 5 Asts: four players 3 PIR: Panko 25 | Arena: Palau Blaugrana; Attendance: 4,593; Referees: Carlos Peruga, Juan Luis Redondo, Pedro Munar |

| 22 March 2015 25 | Valencia Basket | 93–73 | FC Barcelona | Valencia |
| 12:30 | Scoring by quarter: 28–24, 18–18, 22–18, 25–13 |
| | Pts: Ribas 18; Rebs: Ribas, Sato 5 Asts: van Rossom 7 PIR: Ribas 24 | Boxscore | Pts: Thomas 12; Rebs: Navarro, Pleiß 3 Asts: Navarro 7 PIR: Navarro 17 | Arena: La Fonteta; Attendance: 8,500; Referees: Benjamín Jiménez, Fernando Calatrava, Sergio Manuel |

| 28 March 2015 26 | FC Barcelona | 99–83 | Baloncesto Sevilla | Barcelona |
| 20:45 | Scoring by quarter: 17–19, 27–21, 30–26, 25–17 |
| | Pts: Doellman 17; Rebs: Tomić 5 Asts: Satoranský 6 PIR: Thomas 16 | Boxscore | Pts: Porziņģis 18; Rebs: Oriola 8 Asts: Rodríguez 4 PIR: Porziņģis, Radičević 16 | Arena: Palau Blaugrana; Attendance: 4,731; Referees: Juan Carlos Arteaga, Juan de Dios Oyón, Rafael Serrano |

| 5 April 2015 27 | UCAM Murcia CB | 64–76 | FC Barcelona | Murcia |
| 12:40 | Scoring by quarter: 21–23, 18–23, 11–11, 14–19 |
| | Pts: Radović 16; Rebs: Lima 11; Asts: Cabezas, Neto 4 PIR: Cabezas 19 | Boxscore | Pts: Lampe 13; Rebs: Huertas 7 Asts: Huertas 6 PIR: Huertas 18 | Arena: Palacio de Deportes; Attendance: 7,003; Referees: Emilio Pérez Pizarro, José Ramón García Ortiz, David Planells |

| 12 April 2015 28 | Real Madrid | 91–78 | FC Barcelona | Madrid |
| 12:15 | Scoring by quarter: 26–20, 18–18, 17–25, 30–15 |
| | Pts: Carroll 26; Rebs: Rivers 6 Asts: Rodríguez 9 PIR: Carroll 26 | Boxscore | Pts: Tomić 22; Rebs: Tomić 9 Asts: Tomić 4 PIR: Tomić 34 | Arena: WiZink Center; Attendance: 12,178; Referees: Juan Carlos García González, Óscar Perea, Andrés Fernández Sánchez |

| 30 April 2015 29 | FC Barcelona | 79–57 | Rio Monbus Obradoiro | Barcelona |
| 21:00 | Scoring by quarter: 14–18, 20–12, 22–10, 23–17 |
| | Pts: Oleson 11; Rebs: Pleiß 10; Asts: Doellman 5 PIR: Pleiß 16 | Boxscore | Pts: Waczyński 20; Rebs: Triguero 6 Asts: Luz 4 PIR: Waczyński 13 | Arena: Palau Blaugrana; Attendance: 4,015; Referees: Daniel Hierrezuelo, Lluís Guirao, Jacobo Rial |

| 26 April 2015 30 | CAI Zaragoza | 67–103 | FC Barcelona | Zaragoza |
| 12:40 | Scoring by quarter: 20–21, 24–30, 8–28, 15–24 |
| | Pts: Goulding 19; Rebs: Norel 6 Asts: Llompart 4 PIR: Norel 16 | Boxscore | Pts: Thomas 22; Rebs: three players 5 Asts: Jackson 6 PIR: Thomas 22 | Arena: Pabellón Príncipe Felipe; Attendance: 8,243; Referees: Miguel Ángel Pérez Pérez, Juan Luis Redondo, Martín Caballero |

| 3 May 2015 31 | FC Barcelona | 76–62 | Movistar Estudiantes | Barcelona |
| 12:15 | Scoring by quarter: 18–10, 11–19, 27–20, 20–13 |
| | Pts: Abrines 16; Rebs: Tomić 8 Asts: Satoranský 6 PIR: Abrines 18 | Boxscore | Pts: three players 13; Rebs: Birčević, Martín 7 Asts: Aradori, Salgado 4 PIR: Birčević 20 | Arena: Palau Blaugrana; Attendance: 4,178; Referees: Carlos Cortés, Jorge Martínez, Anna Cardús |

| 9 May 2015 32 | FC Barcelona | 80–73 | Dominion Bilbao Basket | Barcelona |
| 21:00 | Scoring by quarter: 30–17, 13–18, 20–15, 17–23 |
| | Pts: Tomić 14; Rebs: Doellman, Thomas 4 Asts: Oleson, Satoranský 4 PIR: Satoranský 19 | Boxscore | Pts: Mumbrú 17; Rebs: Todorović 8 Asts: Colom 11; PIR: Colom 22 | Arena: Palau Blaugrana; Attendance: 4,314; Referees: José Antonio Martín Bertrán, Carlos Sánchez Monserrat, David Planells |

| 17 May 2015 33 | Unicaja | 61–74 | FC Barcelona | Málaga |
| 12:30 | Scoring by quarter: 15–21, 12–19, 15–22, 19–12 |
| | Pts: Vázquez 11; Rebs: Suárez, Thomas 9 Asts: Granger 4 PIR: Suárez 15 | Boxscore | Pts: Thomas 12; Rebs: Tomić 6 Asts: Huertas, Navarro 4 PIR: Tomić 16 | Arena: Martín Carpena; Attendance: 9,243; Referees: Juan Carlos Arteaga, Carlos Peruga, Jacobo Rial |

| 24 May 2015 34 | FC Barcelona | 84–74 | MoraBanc Andorra | Barcelona |
| 18:00 | Scoring by quarter: 20–16, 25–19, 23–22, 16–17 |
| | Pts: Doellman 13; Rebs: Tomić 10; Asts: Satoranský 6 PIR: Satoranský 23 | Boxscore | Pts: Jawai 16; Rebs: Blanch 5 Asts: Schreiner, Trias 5 PIR: Jawai 14 | Arena: Palau Blaugrana; Attendance: 4,582; Referees: Óscar Perea, Lluís Guirao, Anna Cardús |

=== ACB Playoffs ===
==== Quarterfinals ====
| 28 May 2015 1 | FC Barcelona | 77–55 | FIATC Joventut | Barcelona |
| 21:00 | Scoring by quarter: 23–10, 19–11, 20–20, 15–14 |
| | Pts: Tomić 14; Rebs: Doellman 9 Asts: Satoranský 6 PIR: Doellman, Satoranský 21 | Boxscore | Pts: Mallet 13; Rebs: four players 4 Asts: Hannah 3 PIR: Mallet 13 | Arena: Palau Blaugrana; Attendance: 5,284; Referees: Miguel Ángel Pérez Pérez, Carlos Peruga, Andrés Fernández Sánchez |

| 30 May 2015 2 | FIATC Joventut | 74–80 | FC Barcelona | Badalona |
| 18:30 | Scoring by quarter: 19–19, 17–19, 11–16, 27–26 |
| | Pts: Suton 13; Rebs: Suton 10; Asts: Ventura 5 PIR: Suton 14 | Boxscore | Pts: Navarro 13; Rebs: Tomić 9 Asts: Satoranský 5 PIR: Satoranský 19 | Arena: Olímpic de Badalona; Attendance: 7,228; Referees: Juan Carlos García González, Francisco Araña, Rubén Sánchez Mohedas |

==== Semifinals ====
| 5 June 2015 1 | FC Barcelona | 91–60 | Unicaja | Barcelona |
| 21:30 | Scoring by quarter: 23–11, 26–18, 30–15, 12–16 |
| | Pts: Satoranský 14; Rebs: Tomić 7 Asts: Satoranský 5 PIR: Tomić 24 | Boxscore | Pts: Vázquez 10; Rebs: Golubović 6 Asts: four players 2 PIR: Vázquez 13 | Arena: Palau Blaugrana; Attendance: 4,377; Referees: Antonio Conde, Óscar Perea, Carlos Peruga |

| 7 June 2015 2 | FC Barcelona | 91–70 | Unicaja | Barcelona |
| 12:40 | Scoring by quarter: 23–23, 27–14, 17–18, 24–15 |
| | Pts: Satoranský 19; Rebs: Lampe 6 Asts: Satoranský 7 PIR: Satoranský 28 | Boxscore | Pts: Granger 16; Rebs: Kuzminskas, Suárez 5 Asts: Granger 5 PIR: Suárez 16 | Arena: Palau Blaugrana; Attendance: 4,503; Referees: Emilio Pérez Pizarro, Miguel Ángel Pérez Pérez, Fernando Calatrava |

| 10 June 2015 3 | Unicaja | 89–84(OT) | FC Barcelona | Málaga |
| 21:00 | Scoring by quarter: 20–24, 18–18, 18–18, 18–14, Overtime: 15–10 |
| | Pts: Suárez 13; Rebs: Vázquez 13; Asts: Granger 6 PIR: Suárez 22 | Boxscore | Pts: Thomas 17; Rebs: Tomić 7 Asts: Oleson 6 PIR: Tomić 22 | Arena: Martín Carpena; Attendance: 9,386; Referees: Benjamín Jiménez, Óscar Perea, Francisco Araña |

| 12 June 2015 4 | Unicaja | 77–66 | FC Barcelona | Málaga |
| 21:00 | Scoring by quarter: 20–14, 21–10, 14–16, 22–26 |
| | Pts: Granger 11; Rebs: Suárez 12; Asts: Marković, Toolson 3 PIR: Suárez 21 | Boxscore | Pts: Huertas 14; Rebs: Doellman 7 Asts: Huertas 4 PIR: Tomić 17 | Arena: Martín Carpena; Attendance: 9,963; Referees: Emilio Pérez Pizarro, Miguel Ángel Pérez Pérez, Carlos Cortés |

| 14 June 2015 5 | FC Barcelona | 77–74 | Unicaja | Barcelona |
| 17:00 | Scoring by quarter: 18–20, 17–17, 22–20, 20–17 |
| | Pts: Thomas 14; Rebs: Doellman 12; Asts: Satoranský 5 PIR: Tomić 17 | Boxscore | Pts: three players 10; Rebs: Granger, Kuzminskas 5 Asts: Granger 9 PIR: Granger 19 | Arena: Palau Blaugrana; Attendance: 6,028; Referees: Juan Carlos García González, Antonio Conde, Óscar Perea |

==== Finals ====
| 19 June 2015 1 | Real Madrid | 78–72 | FC Barcelona | Madrid |
| 19:00 | Scoring by quarter: 27–20, 20–20, 12–13, 19–19 |
| | Pts: Fernández 17; Rebs: Ayón 7 Asts: Rodríguez 8 PIR: Fernández 21 | Boxscore | Pts: Hezonja 18; Rebs: Pleiß 6 Asts: Huertas, Satoranský 3 PIR: Hezonja 23 | Arena: WiZink Center; Attendance: 12,127; Referees: Antonio Conde, Benjamín Jiménez, Carlos Cortés |

| 21 June 2015 2 | Real Madrid | 100–80 | FC Barcelona | Madrid |
| 12:30 | Scoring by quarter: 31–10, 18–22, 26–24, 25–24 |
| | Pts: Llull 24; Rebs: Slaughter 6 Asts: Rodríguez 6 PIR: Llull 31 | Boxscore | Pts: Doellman 24; Rebs: Doellman 5 Asts: Satoranský 4 PIR: Doellman 23 | Arena: WiZink Center; Attendance: 12,924; Referees: Juan Carlos García González, Miguel Ángel Pérez Pérez, Vicente Bultó |

| 24 June 2015 3 | FC Barcelona | 85–90 | Real Madrid | Barcelona |
| 19:00 | Scoring by quarter: 17–17, 17–31, 33–17, 18–25 |
| | Pts: Tomić 29; Rebs: Doellman, Tomić 7 Asts: Satoranský 8 PIR: Tomić 36 | Boxscore | Pts: Carroll 19; Rebs: Nocioni 6 Asts: Rodríguez 6 PIR: Carroll 16 | Arena: Palau Blaugrana; Attendance: 7,247; Referees: Daniel Hierrezuelo, Emilio Pérez Pizarro, Fernando Calatrava |

=== EuroLeague ===
==== Results summary ====
| Overall | | | | | | Home | | | | | Away | | | | |
| Pld | W | L | PF | PA | PD | W | L | PF | PA | PD | W | L | PF | PA | PD |
|---|---|---|---|---|---|---|---|---|---|---|---|---|---|---|---|
| 24 | 20 | 4 | 2010 | 1800 | +210 | 11 | 1 | 1029 | 916 | +113 | 9 | 3 | 981 | 884 | +97 |

Last updated: 17 October 2025.
Source: Competitive matches

=== Regular season ===
==== Group C ====
| Pos | Team | Pld | W | L | PF | PA | PD |
|---|---|---|---|---|---|---|---|
| 1 | (Spain) FC Barcelona (A) | 10 | 9 | 1 | 861 | 738 | +123 |
| 2 | (Turkey) Fenerbahçe Ülker (A) | 10 | 8 | 2 | 843 | 787 | +56 |
| 3 | (Greece) Panathinaikos (A) | 10 | 5 (Note: Tiebreaker: 1–1 (+25)) | 5 | 768 | 743 | +25 |
| 4 | (Italy) EA7 Milano (A) | 10 | 5 (Note: Tiebreaker: 1–1 (–25)) | 5 | 775 | 795 | −20 |
| 5 | (Germany) Bayern Munich (E) | 10 | 2 | 8 | 806 | 866 | −60 |
| 6 | (Poland) PGE Turów (E) | 10 | 1 | 9 | 773 | 897 | −124 |

(A) Advance to Top 16; (E) Enter 2014–15 Eurocup Basketball last 32 round

==== Matches ====
| 17 October 2014 1 | FC Barcelona (Spain) | 83–81 | (Germany) Bayern Munich | Barcelona |
| 21:30 | Scoring by quarter: 19–19, 29–20, 17–18, 14–13 |
| | Pts: Doellman 16; Rebs: Tomić 10; Asts: Navarro 8 PIR: Tomić 27 | Boxscore | Pts: Đedović 19; Rebs: Bryant 11; Asts: Bryant, Đedović 4 PIR: Đedović 25 | Arena: Palau Blaugrana; Attendance: 6,631; Referees: Tolga Sahin, Eddie Viator, Petros Papapetrou |

| 23 October 2014 2 | EA7 Emporio Armani Milan (Italy) | 63–78 | (Spain) FC Barcelona | Milan |
| 21:00 | Scoring by quarter: 17–20, 15–25, 18–18, 13–15 |
| | Pts: Hackett 16; Rebs: three players 7 Asts: Gentile 8 PIR: Gentile 16 | Boxscore | Pts: Abrines 21; Rebs: Pleiß 6 Asts: Satoranský 6 PIR: Pleiß 23 | Arena: Mediolanum Forum; Attendance: 8,977; Referees: Ilija Belošević, Borys Ryzhyk, Jakub Zamojski |

| 31 October 2014 3 | FC Barcelona (Spain) | 86–67 | (Poland) PGE Turow Zgorzelec | Barcelona |
| 20:45 | Scoring by quarter: 23–21, 26–16, 23–18, 14–12 |
| | Pts: Doellman 20; Rebs: Tomić 9 Asts: Huertas, Oleson 5 PIR: Doellman 25 | Boxscore | Pts: Kulig 19; Rebs: Kulig, Wright 5 Asts: Collins, Dylewicz 4 PIR: Kulig 17 | Arena: Palau Blaugrana; Attendance: 6,306; Referees: Roberto Chiari, Milija Vojinovic, Marko Juras |

| 6 November 2014 4 | Fenerbahçe Ülker Istanbul (Turkey) | 78–80 | (Spain) FC Barcelona | Istanbul |
| 20:45 | Scoring by quarter: 21–19, 20–22, 19–23, 18–16 |
| | Pts: Žorić 17; Rebs: Žorić 10; Asts: Bjelica 4 PIR: Žorić 23 | Boxscore | Pts: Oleson 16; Rebs: Lampe 8 Asts: Huertas 6 PIR: Oleson 18 | Arena: Ülker Sports and Event Hall; Attendance: 10,785; Referees: Luigi Lamonica, Matej Boltauzer, Elias Koromilas |

| 14 November 2014 5 | FC Barcelona (Spain) | 78–69 | (Greece) Panathinaikos | Barcelona |
| 21:00 | Scoring by quarter: 18–18, 16–21, 25–7, 15–18 |
| | Pts: Tomić 16; Rebs: Tomić 10; Asts: Huertas 5 PIR: Tomić 29 | Boxscore | Pts: Batista 14; Rebs: Batista 8 Asts: Diamantidis 4 PIR: Batista 17 | Arena: Palau Blaugrana; Attendance: 6,605; Referees: Milivoje Jovcic, Oļegs Latiševs, Nicola Maestre |

| 20 November 2014 6 | Bayern Munich (Germany) | 77–99 | (Spain) FC Barcelona | Munich |
| 20:15 | Scoring by quarter: 17–22, 22–38, 21–21, 17–18 |
| | Pts: Đedović 14; Rebs: Bryant, Štimac 6 Asts: Đedović, McCalebb 6 PIR: Đedović, Štimac 14 | Boxscore | Pts: three players 15; Rebs: Tomić 6 Asts: Huertas 6 PIR: Huertas 27 | Arena: Audi Dome; Attendance: 6,683; Referees: Christos Christodoulou, Rustu Nuran, Piotr Pastusiak |

| 28 November 2014 7 | FC Barcelona (Spain) | 84–80 | (Italy) EA7 Emporio Armani Milan | Barcelona |
| 20:45 | Scoring by quarter: 16–19, 20–23, 21–14, 27–24 |
| | Pts: Tomić 18; Rebs: Doellman 9 Asts: Oleson 4 PIR: Tomić 29 | Boxscore | Pts: Hackett 21; Rebs: James 6 Asts: Hackett 5 PIR: Hackett 17 | Arena: Palau Blaugrana; Attendance: 7,121; Referees: Spiros Gkontas, Damir Javor, Sasa Maricic |

| 5 December 2014 8 | PGE Turow Zgorzelec (Poland) | 65–104 | (Spain) FC Barcelona | Zgorzelec |
| 20:30 | Scoring by quarter: 13–10, 21–15, 21–25, 21–20 |
| | Pts: Taylor 17; Rebs: Dylewicz 6 Asts: Chyliński 12; PIR: Jaramaz, Taylor 13 | Boxscore | Pts: Nachbar 17; Rebs: Pleiß 6 Asts: Satoranský 6 PIR: Nachbar, Satoranský 16 | Arena: Regionalme Centrum Sportowe; Attendance: 3,217; Referees: Anastasios Piloidis, Robert Vyklicky, Moritz Reiter |

| 11 December 2014 9 | FC Barcelona (Spain) | 89–91(OT) | (Turkey) Fenerbahçe Ülker Istanbul | Barcelona |
| 20:45 | Scoring by quarter: 23–25, 14–17, 24–17, 18–20, Overtime: 10–12 |
| | Pts: Huertas 25; Rebs: Doellman 6 Asts: Huertas 5 PIR: Thomas 31 | Boxscore | Pts: Bogdanović 23; Rebs: Veselý 10; Asts: Sipahi 5 PIR: Veselý 28 | Arena: Palau Blaugrana; Attendance: 6,619; Referees: Ilija Belošević, Jakub Zamojski, Carmelo Paternico |

| 19 December 2014 10 | Panathinaikos (Greece) | 67–80 | (Spain) FC Barcelona | Marousi |
| 21:00 | Scoring by quarter: 10–21, 13–19, 24–20, 20–20 |
| | Pts: Fotsis 14; Rebs: Fotsis 8 Asts: Nelson 5 PIR: Fotsis 21 | Boxscore | Pts: Huertas 17; Rebs: Lampe 10; Asts: Huertas 9 PIR: Huertas 24 | Arena: Telekom Center Athens; Attendance: 13,224; Referees: Fernando Rocha, Tolga Sahin, Eddie Viator |

=== Top 16 ===
==== Group E ====
| Pos | Team | Pld | W | L | PF | PA | PD |
|---|---|---|---|---|---|---|---|
| 1 | (Spain) Real Madrid (A) | 14 | 11 (Note: Tiebreaker: 1–1 (+19)) | 3 | 1224 | 1032 | +192 |
| 2 | (Spain) FC Barcelona (A) | 14 | 11 (Note: Tiebreaker: 1–1 (–19)) | 3 | 1149 | 1062 | +87 |
| 3 | (Israel) Maccabi Tel Aviv (A) | 14 | 9 | 5 | 1071 | 1072 | −1 |
| 4 | (Greece) Panathinaikos (A) | 14 | 7 (Note: Tiebreaker: 1–1 (+4)) | 7 | 1048 | 1022 | +26 |
| 5 | (Germany) Alba Berlin (E) | 14 | 7 (Note: Tiebreaker: 1–1 (–4)) | 7 | 976 | 1031 | −55 |
| 6 | (Lithuania) Žalgiris (E) | 14 | 5 | 9 | 1004 | 1075 | −71 |
| 7 | (Serbia) Crvena Zvezda (E) | 14 | 4 | 10 | 1025 | 1059 | −34 |
| 8 | (Turkey) Galatasaray (E) | 14 | 2 | 12 | 1023 | 1167 | −144 |

(A) Advance to Playoffs; (E) Eliminated
Notes:

| 2 January 2015 1 | Alba Berlin (Germany) | 80–70 | (Spain) FC Barcelona | Berlin |
| 20:00 | Scoring by quarter: 16–23, 23–17, 22–8, 19–22 |
| | Pts: three players 16; Rebs: McLean, Redding 8 Asts: Hammonds, Renfroe 4 PIR: Redding 20 | Boxscore | Pts: Huertas 23; Rebs: Tomić 10; Asts: Huertas 7 PIR: Huertas 20 | Arena: O2 World; Attendance: 9,379; Referees: Paolo Taurino, Panagiotis Anastopoulos, Joseph Bissang |

| 9 January 2015 2 | FC Barcelona (Spain) | 80–76 | (Greece) Panathinaikos | Barcelona |
| 20:45 | Scoring by quarter: 14–20, 23–17, 26–19, 17–20 |
| | Pts: Huertas 22; Rebs: three players 6 Asts: Huertas 5 PIR: Huertas 20 | Boxscore | Pts: Nelson 16; Rebs: Batista 12; Asts: Diamantidis 4 PIR: Batista 19 | Arena: Palau Blaugrana; Attendance: 5,162; Referees: Luigi Lamonica, Milivoje Jovcic, Tomas Jasevicius |

| 15 January 2015 3 | Maccabi Electra Tel Aviv (Israel) | 70–68 | (Spain) FC Barcelona | Tel Aviv |
| 20:05 | Scoring by quarter: 15–13, 21–15, 17–19, 17–21 |
| | Pts: Pargo 20; Rebs: Schortsanitis 9 Asts: Pargo 7 PIR: Pargo 19 | Boxscore | Pts: Tomić 21; Rebs: Tomić 10; Asts: Huertas 7 PIR: Tomić 29 | Arena: Menora Mivtachim Arena; Attendance: 11,060; Referees: Robert Lottermoser, Spiros Gkontas, Milos Koljensic |

| 23 January 2015 4 | FC Barcelona (Spain) | 92–77 | (Serbia) Crvena Zvezda Telekom | Barcelona |
| 20:45 | Scoring by quarter: 27–21, 22–17, 21–21, 22–18 |
| | Pts: Abrines 15; Rebs: Tomić 10; Asts: Huertas 7 PIR: Tomić 20 | Boxscore | Pts: Blažič 13; Rebs: Marjanović 7 Asts: Jović, Williams 5 PIR: Jović 18 | Arena: Palau Blaugrana; Attendance: 7,340; Referees: Borys Ryzhyk, Roberto Chiari, Ioannis Foufis |

| 30 January 2015 5 | FC Barcelona (Spain) | 89–72 | (Lithuania) Žalgiris | Barcelona |
| 20:45 | Scoring by quarter: 29–13, 22–20, 16–20, 22–19 |
| | Pts: Tomić 16; Rebs: Tomić 9 Asts: three players PIR: Tomić 34 | Boxscore | Pts: Gudaitis 17; Rebs: three players 5 Asts: Dimša 4 PIR: Gudaitis 20 | Arena: Palau Blaugrana; Attendance: 6,762; Referees: Grzegorz Ziemblicki, Joseph Bissang, Petros Papapetrou |

| 5 February 2015 6 | Real Madrid (Spain) | 97–73 | (Spain) FC Barcelona | Madrid |
| 20:45 | Scoring by quarter: 26–16, 16–17, 24–20, 31–20 |
| | Pts: Rodríguez 23; Rebs: Fernández 9 Asts: Rodríguez 6 PIR: Fernández 38 | Boxscore | Pts: Hezonja 22; Rebs: Tomić 6 Asts: Abrines 4 PIR: Tomić 16 | Arena: Barclaycard Center; Attendance: 12,662; Referees: Christos Christodoulou, Ilija Belošević, Tolga Sahin |

| 12 February 2015 7 | FC Barcelona (Spain) | 82–70 | (Turkey) Galatasaray Liv Hospital | Barcelona |
| 21:00 | Scoring by quarter: 22–20, 30–19, 14–17, 16–14 |
| | Pts: Satoranský 17; Rebs: Doellman, Tomić 9 Asts: Tomić 5 PIR: Satoranský 24 | Boxscore | Pts: Erceg 18; Rebs: Young 14; Asts: Arlsan 6 PIR: Young 23 | Arena: Palau Blaugrana; Attendance: 7,066; Referees: Robert Lottermoser, Eddie Viator, Aare Halliko |

| 27 February 2015 8 | FC Barcelona (Spain) | 92–82(OT) | (Germany) Alba Berlin | Barcelona |
| 20:45 | Scoring by quarter: 13–14, 27–18, 19–14, 18–31, Overtime: 15–5 |
| | Pts: Doellman 17; Rebs: Tomić 5 Asts: Satoranský 8 PIR: Doellman 22 | Boxscore | Pts: Redding, Renfroe 20; Rebs: Radošević 7 Asts: Renfroe 7 PIR: Renfroe 30 | Arena: Palau Blaugrana; Attendance: 7,634; Referees: Fernando Rocha, Panagiotis Anastopoulos, Marcin Kowalski |

| 5 March 2015 9 | Panathinaikos (Greece) | 77–81 | (Spain) FC Barcelona | Marousi |
| 20:45 | Scoring by quarter: 21–16, 11–26, 20–15, 25–24 |
| | Pts: Batista 16; Rebs: Batista 9 Asts: Diamantidis 6 PIR: Batista, Gist 25 | Boxscore | Pts: Doellman 21; Rebs: Doellman, Tomić 7 Asts: Satoranský 6 PIR: Doellman 18 | Arena: Telekom Center Athens; Attendance: 16,033; Referees: Luigi Lamonica, Carmelo Paternico, Milos Koljensic |

| 12 March 2015 10 | FC Barcelona (Spain) | 89–71 | (Israel) Maccabi Electra Tel Aviv | Barcelona |
| 20:45 | Scoring by quarter: 26–16, 21–18, 17–19, 25–18 |
| | Pts: Tomić 16; Rebs: Tomić 12; Asts: Tomić 6 PIR: Tomić 35 | Boxscore | Pts: Alexander 16; Rebs: Randle, Smith 4 Asts: Smith 3 PIR: Alexander, Schortsanitis 14 | Arena: Palau Blaugrana; Attendance: 7,729; Referees: Ilija Belošević, Tolga Sahin, Boris Shulga |

| 19 March 2015 11 | Crvena Zvezda Telekom (Serbia) | 73–77 | (Spain) FC Barcelona | Belgrade |
| 19:15 | Scoring by quarter: 15–15, 17–22, 18–11, 23–29 |
| | Pts: Marjanović 23; Rebs: Marjanović 11; Asts: Williams 7 PIR: Marjanović 35 | Boxscore | Pts: Navarro 12; Rebs: Satoranský 10; Asts: Satoranský 5 PIR: Satoranský 23 | Arena: Kombank Arena; Attendance: 18,450; Referees: Eddie Viator, Elias Koromilas, Aare Halliko |

| 25 March 2015 12 | Žalgiris (Lithuania) | 72–83 | (Spain) FC Barcelona | Kaunas |
| 18:45 | Scoring by quarter: 16–22, 17–20, 20–23, 19–18 |
| | Pts: Anderson 24; Rebs: Jankūnas 9 Asts: Lekavičius 5 PIR: Anderson 22 | Boxscore | Pts: Abrines 16; Rebs: Pleiß 7 Asts: Huertas 5 PIR: Pleiß 19 | Arena: Žalgirio Arena; Attendance: 9,998; Referees: Fernando Rocha, Paolo Taurino, Milija Vojinovic |

| 2 April 2015 13 | FC Barcelona (Spain) | 85–80 | (Spain) Real Madrid | Barcelona |
| 20:45 | Scoring by quarter: 17–25, 24–16, 23–21, 21–18 |
| | Pts: Hezonja 15; Rebs: Tomić 8 Asts: Navarro 5 PIR: Tomić 18 | Boxscore | Pts: Fernández 20; Rebs: three players 5 Asts: Llull 8 PIR: Llull 16 | Arena: Palau Blaugrana; Attendance: 8,529; Referees: Borys Ryzhyk, Robert Lottermoser, Oļegs Latiševs |

| 10 April 2015 14 | Galatasaray Liv Hospital (Turkey) | 65–88 | (Spain) FC Barcelona | Istanbul |
| 10:00 | Scoring by quarter: 17–21, 17–18, 17–22, 14–27 |
| | Pts: Micov 10; Rebs: Erceg 6 Asts: Güler 7 PIR: Gönlüm 12 | Boxscore | Pts: Tomić 20; Rebs: Pleiß 12; Asts: Huertas, Satoranský 5 PIR: Tomić 27 | Arena: Abdi İpekçi Arena; Referees: Milivoje Jovcic, Spiros Gkontas, Joseph Bissang |

=== Quarterfinals ===
| 15 April 2015 1 | FC Barcelona (Spain) | 73–57 | (Greece) Olympiacos | Barcelona |
| 19:00 | Scoring by quarter: 20–8, 15–18, 15–12, 23–19 |
| | Pts: Nachbar, Navarro 10; Rebs: Lampe 9 Asts: Huertas 4 PIR: Lampe 16 | Boxscore | Pts: Agravanis 9 Rebs: Dunston 5 Asts: Sloukas 4 PIR: Dunston 12 | Arena: Palau Blaugrana; Attendance: 6,289; Referees: Borys Ryzhyk, Recep Ankarali, Oļegs Latiševs |

| 17 April 2015 2 | FC Barcelona (Spain) | 63–76 | (Greece) Olympiacos | Barcelona |
| 21:00 | Scoring by quarter: 10–15, 15–20, 20–21, 18–20 |
| | Pts: Navarro 16; Rebs: Tomić 14; Asts: Satoranský 4 PIR: Navarro, Tomić 20 | Boxscore | Pts: Printezis 22; Rebs: Printezis 9 Asts: Spanoulis 5 PIR: Printezis 34 | Arena: Palau Blaugrana; Attendance: 7,315; Referees: Robert Lottermoser, Tolga Sahin, Rustu Nuran |

| 21 April 2015 3 | Olympiacos (Greece) | 73–71 | (Spain) FC Barcelona | Piraeus |
| 19:00 | Scoring by quarter: 26–23, 18–13, 15–24, 14–11 |
| | Pts: Printezis 19; Rebs: Hunter 7 Asts: Spanoulis 8 PIR: Printezis 21 | Boxscore | Pts: Navarro 14; Rebs: Lampe, Tomić 5 Asts: Huertas, Navarro 6 PIR: Navarro 19 | Arena: Peace and Friendship Stadium; Attendance: 11,624; Referees: Ilija Belošević, Fernando Rocha, Milija Vojinovic |

| 23 April 2015 4 | Olympiacos (Greece) | 71–68 | (Spain) FC Barcelona | Piraeus |
| 21:00 | Scoring by quarter: 16–17, 13–20, 21–13, 21–18 |
| | Pts: Spanoulis 17; Rebs: Hunter 8 Asts: Spanoulis 5 PIR: Spanoulis 17 | Boxscore | Pts: Tomić 13; Rebs: three players 7 Asts: three players 3 PIR: Satoranský 17 | Arena: Peace and Friendship Stadium; Attendance: 11,645; Referees: Milivoje Jovcic, Eddie Viator, Jakub Zamojski |

=== Copa del Rey ===
==== Quarterfinals ====
| 19 February 2015 | FC Barcelona | 85–80 | Valencia Basket | Las Palmas |
| 21:30 | Scoring by quarter: 25–21, 19–17, 18–19, 23–23 |
| | Pts: Abrines, Doellman 16; Rebs: Tomić 7 Asts: Satoranský 4 PIR: Tomić 21 | Boxscore | Pts: Dubljević 19; Rebs: Dubljević 6 Asts: Ribas 6 PIR: Dubljević 18 | Arena: Gran Canaria Arena; Attendance: 9,475; Referees: Juan Carlos Arteaga, Emilio Pérez Pizarro, Carlos Cortés |

==== Semifinals ====
| 21 February 2015 | FC Barcelona | 87–79 | Unicaja | Las Palmas |
| 19:00 | Scoring by quarter: 18–15, 16–24, 25–20, 28–20 |
| | Pts: Thomas 13; Rebs: Tomić 10; Asts: Oleson 5 PIR: Tomić 19 | Boxscore | Pts: Kuzminskas 13; Rebs: Thomas 9 Asts: Granger 7 PIR: Granger 15 | Arena: Gran Canaria Arena; Attendance: 9,806; Referees: Juan Carlos García González, Emilio Pérez Pizarro, Carlos Peruga |

==== Final ====
| 22 February 2015 | FC Barcelona | 71–77 | Real Madrid | Las Palmas |
| 19:00 | Scoring by quarter: 21–18, 21–23, 15–23, 14–13 |
| | Pts: Tomić 25; Rebs: Tomić 11; Asts: Huertas 4 PIR: Tomić 40 | Boxscore | Pts: Fernández 16; Rebs: Ayón, Nocioni 7 Asts: Fernández 5 PIR: Fernández 26 | Arena: Gran Canaria Arena; Attendance: 9,870; Referees: Daniel Hierrezuelo, Emilio Pérez Pizarro, Miguel Ángel Pérez Pérez |

=== Supercopa de España ===
==== Semifinals ====
| 26 September 2014 | Kirolbet Baskonia | 66–95 | FC Barcelona | Vitoria-Gasteiz |
| 21:30 | Scoring by quarter: 16–31, 13–18, 17–22, 20–24 |
| | Pts: Heurtel 17; Rebs: Iverson 7 Asts: Heurtel 5 PIR: Heurtel 22 | Boxscore | Pts: Abrines 16; Rebs: Tomić 7 Asts: Huertas 4 PIR: Satoranský 20 | Arena: Fernando Buesa Arena; Attendance: 8,226; Referees: Emilio Pérez Pizarro, Miguel Ángel Pérez Pérez, Carlos Cortés |

==== Final ====
| 27 September 2014 | Real Madrid | 99–78 | FC Barcelona | Vitoria-Gasteiz |
| 19:00 | Scoring by quarter: 29–14, 20–25, 22–20, 28–19 |
| | Pts: Llull 21; Rebs: Fernández, Reyes 4 Asts: Rodríguez 7 PIR: Llull 24 | Boxscore | Pts: Tomić 17; Rebs: Doellman 7 Asts: Huertas 6 PIR: Tomić 18 | Arena: Fernando Buesa Arena; Attendance: 8,452; Referees: Emilio Pérez Pizarro, Juan Carlos García González, Miguel Ángel Pérez Pérez |

== Individual awards ==
=== Lliga Catalana ===
Finals MVP

- (Croatia) Ante Tomić

=== Liga ACB ===
Player of the Round

- (Poland) Maciej Lampe – Round 7
- (Croatia) Ante Tomić – Round 8
- (Spain) Álex Abrines – Round 9
- (Germany) Tibor Pleiß – Round 11
- (Croatia) Mario Hezonja – Round 19

All-ACB Best Young Players Team

- (Spain) Álex Abrines

=== EuroLeague ===
All-EuroLeague Second Team

- (Croatia) Ante Tomić

MVP of the Round

- (Croatia) Ante Tomić – Top 16 Game 5, Top 16 Game 10
