= 2008 ACB Playoffs =

Spanish basketball league play-offs

The 2008 ACB Playoffs was the final phase of the 2007-2008 ACB season. It started on Thursday, May 15, 2008, and ran until Tuesday, June 3, 2008.

A change in the schedule was introduced in this season: Quarterfinals and Semifinals series were 3-match rounds instead of the 5-match rounds used in the previous years. This modification had apparently revealed to be quite significant, since the first (Real Madrid) and the second (DKV Joventut) classifieds of the Regular Season were surprisingly out earlier than it was expected.

Final series brought face to face TAU Cerámica and AXA FC Barcelona for the first time in ACB history (there has always been one of these two teams separately in a Final since the 1993–94 season).

TAU Cerámica won the Final series by 3-0 and obtained their second ACB championship.

Quarter Finals
1	Real Madrid	0
8	Unicaja Málaga	2
4	TAU Cerámica	2
5	Pamesa Valencia	1
2	DKV Joventut	2
7	Akasvayu Girona	1
3	AXA FC Barcelona	2
6	Iurbentia Bilbao Basket	0

SemiFinals
8	Unicaja Málaga	0
4	TAU Cerámica	2
2	DKV Joventut	0
3	AXA FC Barcelona	2

Finals
4	TAU Cerámica	3
3	AXA FC Barcelona	0

== Playoff seedings, results, and schedules ==
=== Quarterfinals ===
The quarterfinals were best-of-3 series.

==== Real Madrid vs. Unicaja Málaga ====
15 May
21:35 CEST

Report

Real Madrid	73–89	Unicaja Málaga
Scoring by quarter: 22-18, 19-22, 11-26, 21-23
Pts: Hervelle 20; Rebs: Hervelle 7 Asts: five players 2		Pts: Cabezas 16; Rebs: Rodríguez 4 Asts: Welsch 7
0-1

Palacio Vistalegre, Madrid
Attendance: 8,200
Referees: Juan Carlos Arteaga, Oscar Perea, Lluis Guirao

17 May
20:00 CEST

Report

Unicaja Málaga	88–86	Real Madrid
Scoring by quarter: 20-12, 16-24, 24-19, 28-31
Pts: Cabezas, Rodríguez 22; Rebs: N'Dong 8 Asts: Rodríguez 4		Pts: Bullock 28; Rebs: three players 6 Asts: Reyes, Mumbrú 2
2-0

Jose Maria Martin Carpena Arena, Málaga
Attendance: 10,000
Referees: M.A. Pérez Pérez, Redondo, Antonio Conde

Unicaja Málaga win the series 2-0

==== DKV Joventut vs. Akasvayu Girona ====
16 May
20:30 CEST

Report

DKV Joventut	85–72	Akasvayu Girona
Scoring by quarter: 28-20, 17-18, 29-12, 11-22
Pts: Fernández 22; Rebs: Moïso 8 Asts: Fernández 4		Pts: Gasol 15; Rebs: Daniels, Gasol 8 Asts: Sada 8
1-0

Palau Municipal d'Esports de Badalona, Badalona
Attendance: 8,271
Referees: J.A. Martín Bertrán, J.C García González, Carlos Cortés

18 May
12:30 CEST

Report

Akasvayu Girona	91–83	DKV Joventut
Scoring by quarter: 21-17, 19-24, 26-20, 25-22
Pts: Gasol 25; Rebs: Gasol 10; Asts: Gasol 8		Pts: Mallet 22; Rebs: Bartoň 6 Asts: Fernández 4
1-1

Palau Girona-Fontajau, Girona
Referees: Fco. De La Maza, Oscar Perea, Francisco J. Araña

20 May
20:30 CEST

Report

DKV Joventut	86–75	Akasvayu Girona
Scoring by quarter: 25-17, 23-19, 11-23, 27-16
Pts: Fernández 24; Rebs: Moïso 7 Asts: Fernández 6		Pts: Gasol 23; Rebs: Gasol 10; Asts: Sada 4
2-1

Palau Municipal d'Esports de Badalona, Badalona
Attendance: 8,490
Referees: Juan Carlos Mitjana, Daniel Hierrezuelo, J.C García González

DKV Joventut win the series 2-1

==== AXA FC Barcelona vs. iurbentia Bilbao ====
16 May
20:45 CEST

Report

AXA FC Barcelona	86–75	iurbentia Bilbao
Scoring by quarter: 13-15, 19-18, 19-14, 24-17
Pts: Lakovič 20; Rebs: Kasun 8 Asts: Basile, Sánchez 4		Pts: Banić 13; Rebs: Weis 6 Asts: three players 3
1-0

Palau Blaugrana, Barcelona
Attendance: 4,524
Referees: J.R. García Ortiz, Antonio Conde, C Sánchez Monserrat

18 May
19:15 CEST

Report

iurbentia Bilbao	83–92	AXA FC Barcelona
Scoring by quarter: 16-18, 18-22, 19-23, 30-29
Pts: Recker 18; Rebs: Pašalić 6 Asts: Huertas 9		Pts: Acker 31; Rebs: İlyasova 7 Asts: Sánchez 6
0-2

La Casilla, Bilbao
Attendance: 5,000
Referees: Xavier Amorós, E. Pérez Pizarro, Jiménez Trujillo

AXA FC Barcelona win the series 2-0

==== TAU Cerámica vs. Pamesa Valencia ====
16 May
20:30 CEST

Report

TAU Cerámica	87–79	Pamesa Valencia
Scoring by quarter: 25-15, 14-22, 20-13, 28-29
Pts: Mickeal 23; Rebs: Mickeal, Singleton 6 Asts: Prigioni, Rakočević 2		Pts: Barać 13; Rebs: Barać 8 Asts: Williams 6
1-0

Fernando Buesa Arena, Vitoria-Gasteiz
Attendance: 8,600
Referees: Juan Carlos Mitjana, E. Pérez Pizarro, Jiménez Trujillo

18 May
12:30 CEST

Report

Pamesa Valencia	100–95	TAU Cerámica
Scoring by quarter: 22-28, 21-23, 32-22, 25-22
Pts: Williams 29; Rebs: Milojević 8 Asts: Williams 9		Pts: Splitter 23; Rebs: Splitter 13; Asts: Prigioni 5
1-1

Pabellon Municipal Fuente San Luis, Valencia
Attendance: 8,000
Referees: Daniel Hierrezuelo, Vicente Bultó, José Javier Murgui

20 May
20:30 CEST

Report

TAU Cerámica	82–61	Pamesa Valencia
Scoring by quarter: 25-12, 15-13, 16-15, 26-21
Pts: Rakočević 21; Rebs: Teletović 8 Asts: Prigioni, Splitter 5		Pts: Milojević 12; Rebs: Milojević 12; Asts: Williams 5
2-1

Fernando Buesa Arena, Vitoria-Gasteiz
Attendance: 8,650
Referees: Juan Carlos Arteaga, M.A. Pérez Pérez, Redondo

TAU Ceramica win the series 2-1

=== Semifinals ===
The semifinals were best-of-3 series.

==== TAU Cerámica vs. Unicaja Málaga ====
23 May
20:30 CEST

Report

TAU Cerámica	81–68	Unicaja Málaga
Scoring by quarter: 29-19, 19-13, 8-18, 25-18
Pts: Planinić 15; Rebs: Mickeal 9 Asts: Vidal 3		Pts: N'Dong 19; Rebs: Jiménez 6 Asts: Rodríguez 7
1-0

Fernando Buesa Arena, Vitoria-Gasteiz
Attendance: 8,000
Referees: Juan Carlos Mitjana, E. Pérez Pizarro, Oscar Perea

25 May
12:30 CEST

Report

Unicaja Málaga	82–83	TAU Cerámica
Scoring by quarter: 22-24, 22-22, 20-14, 18-23
Pts: N'Dong 18; Rebs: Jiménez, N'Dong 7 Asts: three players 4		Pts: Rakočević 21; Rebs: Teletović 6 Asts: Prigioni 3
0-2

Jose Maria Martin Carpena Arena, Málaga
Attendance: 10,000
Referees: Xavier Amorós, Juan Carlos Arteaga, Redondo

TAU Cerámica win the series 2-0

==== DKV Joventut vs. AXA FC Barcelona ====
22 May
21:35 CEST

Report

DKV Joventut	90–93	AXA FC Barcelona
Scoring by quarter: 24-20, 18-18, 20-27, 28-28
Pts: Fernández 30; Rebs: Bartoň 6 Asts: Rubio 8		Pts: Lakovič 23; Rebs: İlyasova 14; Asts: Lakovič 6
0-1

Palau Municipal d'Esports de Badalona, Badalona
Attendance: 10,305
Referees: J.A. Martín Bertrán, M.A. Pérez Pérez, Antonio Conde

24 May
20:00 CEST

Report

AXA FC Barcelona	85–71	DKV Joventut
Scoring by quarter: 22-6, 23-34, 19-19, 21-12
Pts: Acker 20; Rebs: İlyasova 18; Asts: three players 3		Pts: Hernández-Sonseca 13; Rebs: Moïso 6 Asts: Mallet, Rubio 3
2-0

Palau Blaugrana, Barcelona
Attendance: 7,594
Referees: Fco. De La Maza, Daniel Hierrezuelo, J.C García González

AXA FC Barcelona win the series 2-0

=== ACB finals ===
The finals were best-of-5 series.

==== AXA FC Barcelona vs. TAU Cerámica ====
29 May
21:35 CEST

Report

AXA FC Barcelona	64–75	TAU Cerámica
Scoring by quarter: 21-22, 11-24, 19-12, 13-17
Pts: İlyasova 21; Rebs: İlyasova 10; Asts: Basile 6		Pts: Splitter 21; Rebs: Singleton 10; Asts: Splitter 4
0-1

Palau Blaugrana, Barcelona
Attendance: 7,123
Referees: Juan Carlos Arteaga, M.A. Pérez Pérez, Redondo

31 May
20:00 CEST

Report

AXA FC Barcelona	74–78	TAU Cerámica
Scoring by quarter: 16-20, 22-20, 16-17, 20-21
Pts: İlyasova 15; Rebs: İlyasova 10; Asts: Grimau, Sánchez 4		Pts: Mickeal 20; Rebs: Splitter 9 Asts: Prigioni, Splitter 2
0-2

Palau Blaugrana, Barcelona
Attendance: 7,249
Referees: Daniel Hierrezuelo, J.A. Martín Bertrán, J.C García González

3 June
22:00 CEST

Report

TAU Cerámica	76–61	AXA FC Barcelona
Scoring by quarter: 15-9, 16-17, 27-22, 18-13
Pts: Rakočević 16; Rebs: Mickeal 10; Asts: Prigioni 7		Pts: Vázquez 12; Rebs: Vázquez 6 Asts: Lakovič 4
3-0

Fernando Buesa Arena, Vitoria-Gasteiz
Attendance: 9,900
Referees: Juan Carlos Arteaga, E. Pérez Pizarro, Antonio Conde

TAU Cerámica win the series 3-0

2007-08 ACB League
TAU Cerámica
Second Title
