= 2008 Copa del Rey de Baloncesto =

The Copa del Rey 2007-08 was the 72nd edition of the Spanish basketball Cup. It was organized by the ACB and was disputed in Vitoria-Gasteiz, Basque Country in the Fernando Buesa Arena between days 7 and 10 of February. The winning team was DKV Joventut.

== Brackett ==
| Quarterfinals; February 7 & 8 | | Semifinals; February 9 | | Final; February 10 |
| TAU Cerámica | 78 |
| Unicaja | 71 | TAU Cerámica | 68 |
| iurbentia Bilbao | 70 | iurbentia Bilbao | 66 |
| AXA FC Barcelona | 69 | | | TAU Cerámica | 80 |
| DKV Joventut | 84 | | | DKV Joventut | 82 |
| Pamesa Valencia | 59 | DKV Joventut | 81 |
| Real Madrid | 73 | Real Madrid | 76 |
| Akasvayu Girona | 60 |

=== Quarterfinals ===
February 7
19:00 GTM+1

Report

| TAU Cerámica (Basque Country (autonomous community)) | 78–71 | (Andalusia) Unicaja |
Scoring by quarter: 17-16, 23-17, 13-22, 25-16
| Pts: Rakočević 19; Rebs: Vidal, McDonald 7 Asts: Rakočević 5 | | Pts: Haislip 17; Rebs: Cabezas, N'Dong 5 Asts: Cabezas 4 |

Fernando Buesa Arena, Vitoria-Gasteiz
Attendance: 9,500
Referees: Juan Carlos Arteaga, J.R. García Ortiz, J.C García González

February 7
21:30 GTM+1

Report

| iurbentia Bilbao (Basque Country (autonomous community)) | 70–69 | (Catalonia) AXA FC Barcelona |
Scoring by quarter: 24-24, 15-10, 13-12, 18-23
| Pts: Huertas 18; Rebs: Weis 10; Asts: Huertas 8 | | Pts: Lakovič 22; Rebs: Three players 6 Asts: Sánchez 7 |

Fernando Buesa Arena, Vitoria-Gasteiz
Attendance: 9,500
Referees: Xavier Amorós, Daniel Hierrezuelo, Jiménez Trujillo

February 8
17:45 GTM+1

Report

| DKV Joventut (Catalonia) | 84–59 | (Valencian Community) Pamesa Valencia |
Scoring by quarter: 21-14, 18-19, 17-12, 28-14
| Pts: Fernández 20; Rebs: Bartoň 9 Asts: Fernández 5 | | Pts: Douglas 17; Rebs: Garcés 7 Asts: Williams 4 |

Fernando Buesa Arena, Vitoria-Gasteiz
Attendance: 9,200
Referees: Juan Carlos Mitjana, Redondo, Antonio Conde

February 8
20:00 GTM+1

Report

| Real Madrid (Community of Madrid) | 73–60 | (Catalonia) Akasvayu Girona |
Scoring by quarter: 15-20, 22-17, 15-10, 21-13
| Pts: Bullock 20; Rebs: Hervelle 8 Asts: Bullock 3 | | Pts: Gasol 19; Rebs: McDonald 6 Asts: Sada 4 |

Fernando Buesa Arena, Vitoria-Gasteiz
Attendance: 9,500
Referees: Fco. De La Maza, M.A. Pérez Pérez, Oscar Perea

=== SemiFinals ===
February 9
17:30 GTM+1

Report

| TAU Cerámica (Basque Country (autonomous community)) | 68–66 | (Basque Country (autonomous community)) iurbentia Bilbao |
Scoring by quarter: 10-16, 24-16, 19-15, 15-19
| Pts: Rakočević, Mickeal 16; Rebs: Mickeal 10; Asts: Prigioni 3 | | Pts: Lewis 16; Rebs: Banić 9 Asts: Huertas 2 |

Fernando Buesa Arena, Vitoria-Gasteiz
Attendance: 9,463
Referees: Juan Carlos Mitjana, Juan Carlos Arteaga, Oscar Perea

February 9
20:00 GTM+1

Report

| Real Madrid (Community of Madrid) | 76–81 | (Catalonia) DKV Joventut |
Scoring by quarter: 28-20, 18-24, 15-24, 15-13
| Pts: Bullock 20; Rebs: Reyes 12; Asts: López 5 | | Pts: Mallet 16; Rebs: Bartoň, Hernández-Sonseca 5 Asts: Fernández 9 |

Fernando Buesa Arena, Vitoria-Gasteiz
Attendance: 9,500
Referees: Daniel Hierrezuelo, J.R. García Ortiz, Antonio Conde

=== Final ===
February 10
18:00 GTM+1

Report

| TAU Cerámica (Basque Country (autonomous community)) | 80–82 | (Catalonia) DKV Joventut |
Scoring by quarter: 14-13, 19-17, 25-25, 22-27
| Pts: Teletović 17; Rebs: McDonald 7 Asts: Prigioni, Vidal 3 | | Pts: Fernández 32; Rebs: Moïso 6 Asts: Rubio 4 |

Fernando Buesa Arena, Vitoria-Gasteiz
Attendance: 9,500
Referees: Xavier Amorós, Daniel Hierrezuelo, Antonio Conde

Copa del Rey 2008 Champions
DKV Joventut
8th title

- Barclaycard MVP of the Final: Rudy Fernández

== Television Broadcasting ==
- TVE2, FORTA and Teledeporte.

== Organizer ==
- ACB and the Ayuntamiento de Vitoria-Gasteiz.

== Sponsorships ==
- Nike, Mahou-San Miguel and Winterthur Group.
