= 2015 Copa del Rey de Baloncesto =

Tournament details
- Arena: Gran Canaria Arena; Las Palmas
- Dates: 19–22 February 2015

Final positions
- Champions: Real Madrid (25th title)
- Runners-up: FC Barcelona

Awards and statistics
- MVP: (Spain) Rudy Fernández

The 2015 Copa del Rey de Baloncesto was the 79th edition of the Spanish King's Basketball Cup. It was managed by the ACB and was held in Las Palmas, in the Gran Canaria Arena on February 19–22, 2014. Real Madrid won their 24th cup, Rudy Fernández was named MVP.

== Qualified teams ==
The seven first qualified after the first half of the 2014–15 ACB regular season qualified to the tournament. As Herbalife Gran Canaria, host team, finished between the seven first teams, the eighth qualified joined the Copa del Rey.

Pos	Team	Pld	W	L	PF	PA	PD	Qualification
1	Unicaja	17	14	3	1400	1271	+129	Qualified as seeded teams
2	Real Madrid	17	13	4	1440	1312	+128	Qualified as seeded teams
3	FIATC Joventut	17	13	4	1340	1291	+49	Qualified as seeded teams
4	FC Barcelona Lassa	17	12	5	1374	1218	+156	Qualified as seeded teams
5	Bilbao Basket	17	12	5	1295	1234	+61	
6	Valencia Basket	17	10	7	1351	1276	+75	
7	Herbalife Gran Canaria (H)	17	10	7	1327	1281	+46	
8	CAI Zaragoza	17	10	7	1291	1287	+4	

Source: ACB
(H) Hosts

== Draw ==
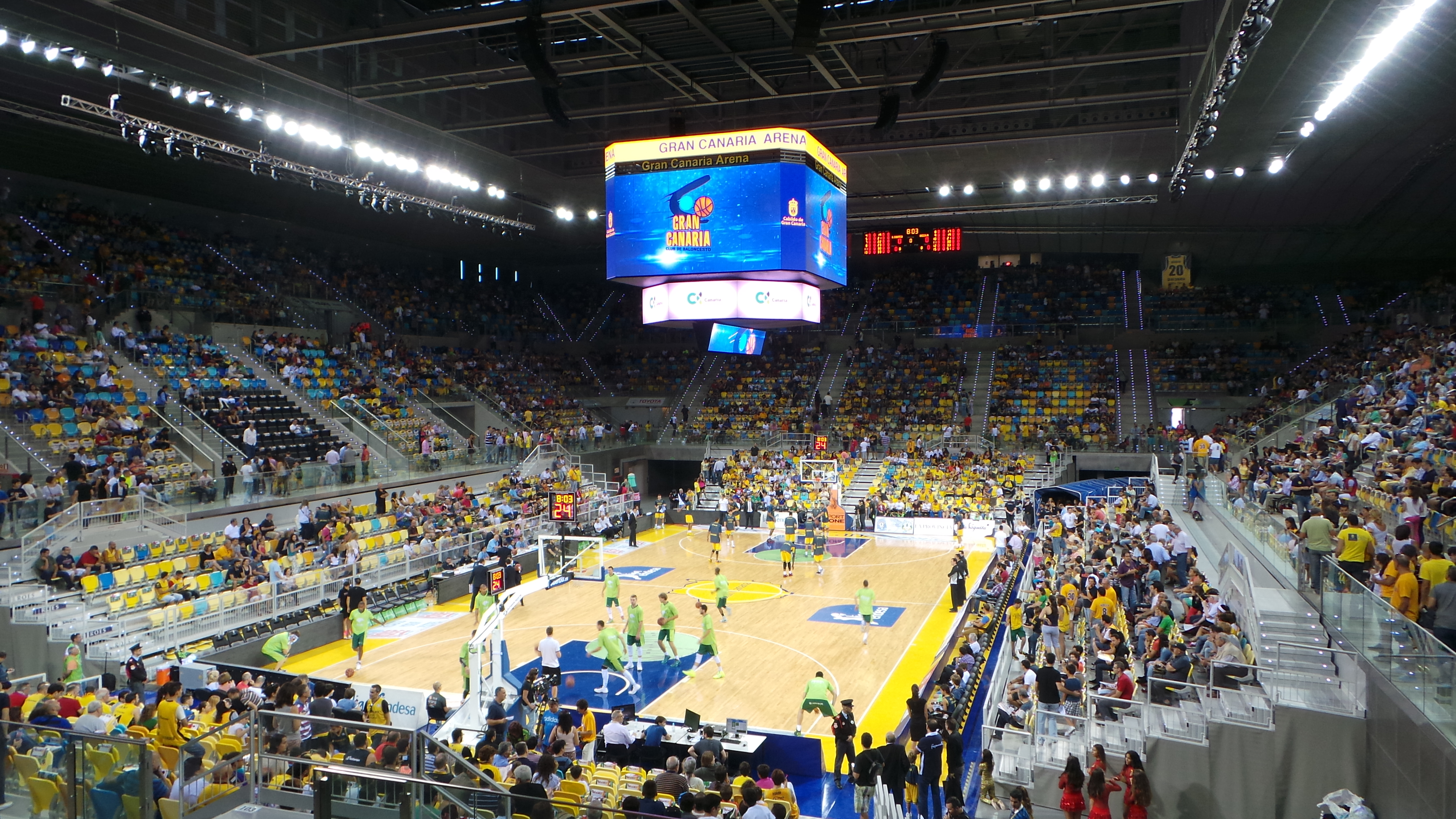
Gran Canaria Arena, court of the Copa del Rey and its draw

The 2015 Copa del Rey de Baloncesto was drawn on 19 January 2015 at approximately 12:00 CET and was broadcast live on YouTube and on TV in many countries. The seeded teams were paired in the quarterfinals with the non-seeded teams. There were not any restrictions for the draw of the semifinals. As in recent seasons, the first qualified team plays its quarterfinal game on Thursday.

== Bracket ==
Quarterfinals
19 February
FC Barcelona	85
Valencia Basket	80
19 February
Unicaja	86
Bilbao Basket	78
20 February
Herbalife Gran Canaria	67
FIATC Joventut	74
20 February
Real Madrid	85
CAI Zaragoza	73

Semifinals
21 February
FC Barcelona	87
Unicaja	79
21 February
FIATC Joventut	83
Real Madrid	100

Final
22 February
FC Barcelona	71
Real Madrid	77

=== Quarterfinals ===
19 February 2015	FC Barcelona	85–80	Valencia Basket	Las Palmas
19:00 (CET)	Scoring by quarter: 25–21, 19–17, 18–19, 23–23
	Pts: Abrines, Doellman 16; Rebs: Tomić 7 Asts: Satoranský 4 PIR: Tomić 21	Boxscore	Pts: Dubljević 19; Rebs: Dubljević 6 Asts: Ribas 6 PIR: Dubljević 18	Arena: Gran Canaria Arena; Attendance: 9,890; Referees: Arteaga, Pérez Pizarro, Cortés

19 February 2015	Unicaja	86–78	Bilbao Basket	Las Palmas
21:30 (CET)	Scoring by quarter: 21–17, 20–20, 27–22, 18–19
	Pts: Granger 18; Rebs: Kuzminskas 7 Asts: Granger 4 PIR: Kuzminskas 24	Boxscore	Pts: Bertāns, Colom 17; Rebs: Williams 8 Asts: López 4 PIR: Colom, Todorović 17	Arena: Gran Canaria Arena; Attendance: 9,475; Referees: Martín Bertrán, Pérez Pérez, Perea

20 February 2015	Real Madrid	85–73	CAI Zaragoza	Las Palmas
19:00 (CET)	Scoring by quarter: 21–21, 16–20, 30–15, 18–17
	Pts: Fernández 16; Rebs: Fernández 8 Asts: Llull 7 PIR: Fernández 25	Boxscore	Pts: Norel 14; Rebs: Jelovac 10; Asts: Lisch, Llompart 4 PIR: Norel 22	Arena: Gran Canaria Arena; Attendance: 9,720; Referees: Hierrezuelo, Jiménez, Calatrava

20 February 2015	Herbalife Gran Canaria	67–74	FIATC Joventut	Las Palmas
21:30 (CET)	Scoring by quarter: 16–11, 12–23, 25–14, 14–26
	Pts: Kuric 19; Rebs: Tavares 10; Asts: Báez 2 PIR: Kuric 16	Boxscore	Pts: Vidal 21; Rebs: Llovet 7 Asts: Savané 4 PIR: Vidal 15	Arena: Gran Canaria Arena; Attendance: 9,850; Referees: García González, Conde, Peruga

=== Semifinals ===
21 February 2015	FC Barcelona	87–79	Unicaja	Las Palmas
19:00 (CET)	Scoring by quarter: 18–15, 16–24, 25–20, 28–20
	Pts: Thomas 13; Rebs: Tomić 10; Asts: Oleson 5 PIR: Tomić 19	Boxscore	Pts: Kuzminskas 13; Rebs: Thomas 9 Asts: Granger 7 PIR: Granger 15	Arena: Gran Canaria Arena; Attendance: 9,806; Referees: García González, Pérez Pizarro, Peruga

21 February 2015	FIATC Joventut	83–100	Real Madrid	Las Palmas
21:30 (CET)	Scoring by quarter: 26–24, 26–22, 8–25, 23–29
	Pts: Savané 14; Rebs: Miralles 6 Asts: Vidal 5 PIR: Savané 16	Boxscore	Pts: Llull 19; Rebs: Ayón 5 Asts: Rodríguez 7 PIR: Llull 23	Arena: Gran Canaria Arena; Attendance: 9,806; Referees: Arteaga, Jiménez, Cortés

=== Final ===
22 February 2015	FC Barcelona	71–77	Real Madrid	Las Palmas
19:00 (CET)	Scoring by quarter: 21–18, 21–23, 15–23, 14–13
	Pts: Tomić 25; Rebs: Tomić 11; Asts: Huertas 4 PIR: Tomić 41	Boxscore	Pts: Fernández 16; Rebs: Ayón, Nocioni 7 Asts: Fernández 5 PIR: Fernández 26	Arena: Gran Canaria Arena; Attendance: 9,870; Referees: Hierrezuelo, Pérez Pizarro, Pérez Pérez

Starters:			Pts	Reb	Ast
PG	13	(Czech Republic) Tomáš Satoranský	11	3	0
SG	24	(United States) Brad Oleson	4	3	2
SF	8	(Croatia) Mario Hezonja	0	3	0
PF	5	(United States) Justin Doellman	11	8	3
C	44	(Croatia) Ante Tomić	25	11	1
Reserves:					
F	23	(United States) Deshaun Thomas	7	4	0
G	10	(Spain) Álex Abrines	7	4	0
G	11	(Spain) Juan Carlos Navarro	6	0	0
G	9	(Brazil) Marcelinho Huertas	0	1	4
F	30	(Poland) Maciej Lampe	0	1	0
F	34	(Slovenia) Boštjan Nachbar	0	0	0
C	21	(Germany) Tibor Pleiß	0	1	0
Head coach:
(Spanish Basketball Federation) Xavi Pascual

FC Barcelona	Real Madrid

Copa del Rey MVP
(Spain) Rudy Fernández
Game rules
Game was played under FIBA rules.

2015 Copa del Rey winners
Real Madrid
25th title

Starters:			Pts	Reb	Ast
PG	23	(Spain) Sergio Llull	0	1	2
SG	5	(Spain) Rudy Fernández	16	4	5
SF	20	(Azerbaijan) Jaycee Carroll	5	2	0
PF	9	(Spain) Felipe Reyes	8	1	0
C	14	(Mexico) Gustavo Ayón	10	7	1
Reserves:					
G	13	(Spain) Sergio Rodríguez	13	4	4
F	6	(Argentina) Andrés Nocioni	10	7	0
G	8	(Lithuania) Jonas Mačiulis	8	2	0
F	44	(United States) Marcus Slaughter	4	1	0
C	30	(Greece) Ioannis Bourousis	4	2	1
G	4	(United States) K.C. Rivers	2	1	0
G	7	(Argentina) Facundo Campazzo	0	0	0
Head coach:
(Spanish Basketball Federation) Pablo Laso
