= 2004 Copa del Rey de Baloncesto =

The Copa del Rey 2003-04 was the 68th edition of the Spanish basketball Cup. It was organized by the ACB and was disputed in Sevilla in the Palacio Municipal de Deportes San Pablo between 26 and 29 February 2004. The winning team was TAU Cerámica.

== Brackett ==
Quarterfinals; February 26 & 27		Semifinals; February 28		Final; February 29
Ricoh Manresa	87
DKV Joventut	90	DKV Joventut	86
FC Barcelona	80	FC Barcelona	72
Real Madrid	79			DKV Joventut	77
Caja San Fernando	86			TAU Cerámica	81
Pamesa Valencia	76	Caja San Fernando	63
TAU Cerámica	89	TAU Cerámica	88
Adecco Estudiantes	83

== Quarterfinals ==
February 26
18:15 GTM+1

Box Score

(Catalonia) Ricoh Manresa	87–90 (OT)	(Catalonia) DKV Joventut
Scoring by quarter: 17-12, 24-23, 23-23, 13-19, Overtime: 10-13
Pts: Brown 17; Rebs: de Miguel 8 Asts: Hernández 2		Pts: Fernández 15; Rebs: Alzamora 7 Asts: Marco 4

Palacio Municipal de Deportes San Pablo, Seville
Referees: Amorós, Maza and Hierrezuelo

February 26
20:30 GTM+1

Box Score

(Catalonia) FC Barcelona	80–79	(Community of Madrid) Real Madrid
Scoring by quarter: 22-29, 25-22, 16-9, 17-19
Pts: Navarro 23; Rebs: Bodiroga 7 Asts: Navarro, Bodiroga 3		Pts: Kambala 26; Rebs: Kambala 8 Asts: Bennett 3

Palacio Municipal de Deportes San Pablo, Seville
Referees: Ramos, Martín and Conde

February 27
18:45 GTM+1

Box Score

(Andalusia) Caja San Fernando	86–76	(Valencian Community) Pamesa Valencia
Scoring by quarter: 23-17, 19-21, 19-21, 25-17
Pts: Santangelo, Evtimov 19; Rebs: Evtimov 10; Asts: Santangelo 5		Pts: Oberto 16; Rebs: Tomašević, Paraíso 6 Asts: five players 2

Palacio Municipal de Deportes San Pablo, Seville
Referees: Sancha, Arteaga and García González

February 27
21:00 GTM+1

Box Score

(Basque Country (autonomous community)) TAU Cerámica	89–83	(Community of Madrid) Adecco Estudiantes
Scoring by quarter: 22-22, 28-19, 16-21, 23-21
Pts: Nocioni 24; Rebs: Nocioni 12; Asts: Prigioni, Macijauskas 4		Pts: Reyes 25; Rebs: Reyes 10; Asts: Azofra, Lončar 4

Palacio Municipal de Deportes San Pablo, Seville
Referees: Mitjana, García Ortiz and Pérez Pizarro

== Semifinals ==
February 28
17:00 GTM+1

Box Score

(Catalonia) DKV Joventut	86–72	(Catalonia) FC Barcelona
Scoring by quarter: 25-8, 15-21, 16-12, 30-31
Pts: Digbeu 18; Rebs: Tabak 9 Asts: Guzmán 4		Pts: Navarro 27; Rebs: Varejão 7 Asts: three players 3

Palacio Municipal de Deportes San Pablo, Seville
Referees: Sancha, Hierrezuelo and Arteaga

February 28
19:15 GTM+1

Box Score

(Andalusia) Caja San Fernando	63–88	(Basque Country (autonomous community)) TAU Cerámica
Scoring by quarter: 17-20, 12-27, 15-21, 19-20
Pts: Slanina 12; Rebs: Jones, Evtimov 9 Asts: Evtimov 4		Pts: Scola 24; Rebs: Scola 9 Asts: Calderón 4

Palacio Municipal de Deportes San Pablo, Seville
Referees: Ramos, Amorós and Martín Bertrán

== Final ==
February 29
18:00 GTM+1

Box Score

(Basque Country (autonomous community)) TAU Cerámica	81–77	(Catalonia) DKV Joventut
Scoring by quarter: 18-16, 20-19, 17-23, 26-19
Pts: Scola 22; Rebs: Scola, Nocioni 7 Asts: Prigioni 5		Pts: Fernández 15; Rebs: Fernández 6 Asts: Guzmán 3

Palacio Municipal de Deportes San Pablo, Seville
Attendance: 9,200
Referees: Mitjana, García and Maza

Copa del Rey 2004 Champions

TAU Cerámica
4th title

- MVP of the Tournament: Rudy Fernández

== See also ==
- ACB
- Copa del Rey de Baloncesto
