= Josep Maria Guzmán =

Spanish basketball player

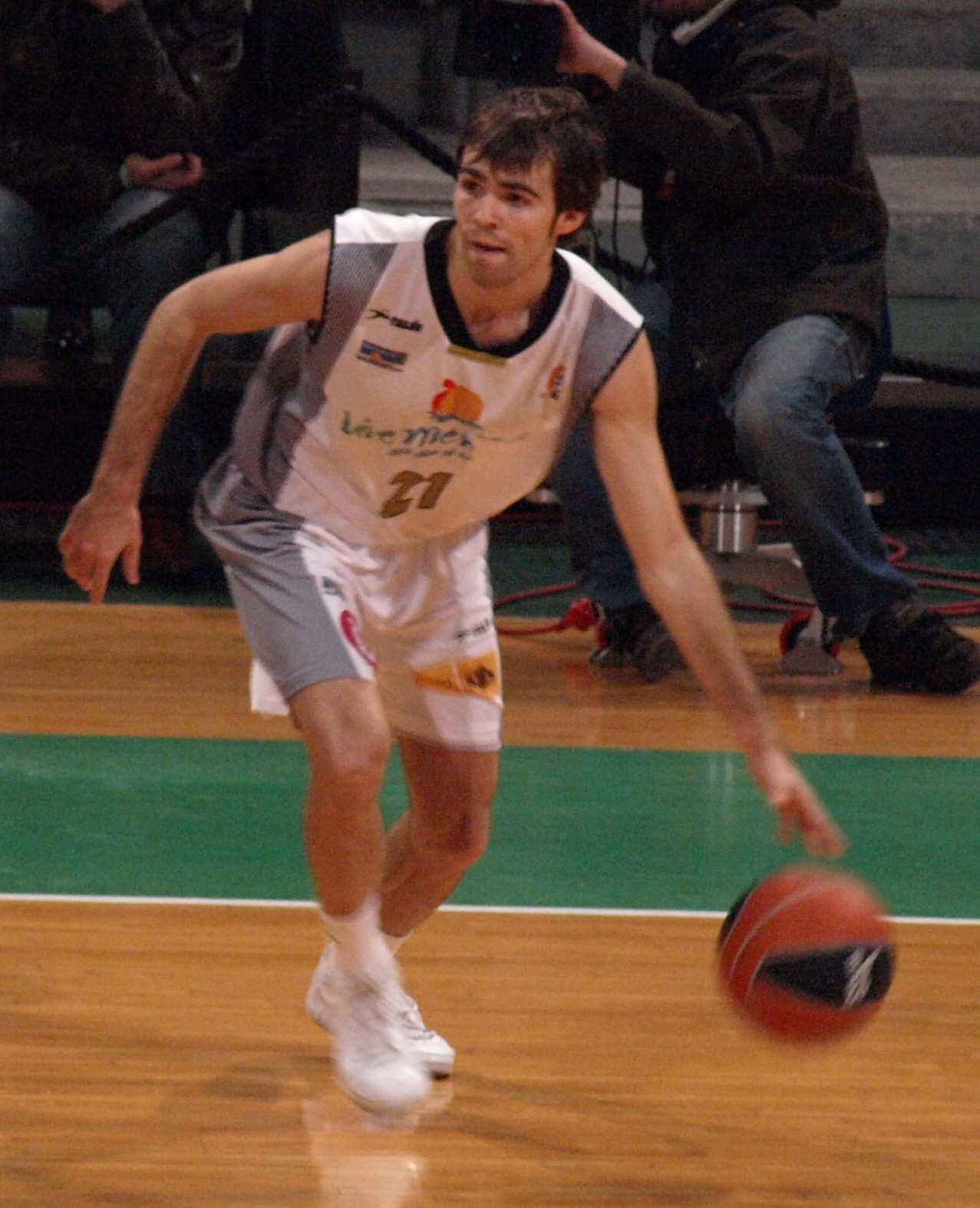

CE Lleida Bàsquet
- Position: Point guard
- League: LEB Oro

Personal information
- Born: February 28, 1984 (age 42) Badalona
- Listed height: 6 ft 0.5 in (1.84 m)
- Listed weight: 155 lb (70 kg)

Career information
- Playing career: 2001–present

Josep Maria Guzmán Cañas (born February 28, 1984, in Badalona, Catalonia) is a Spanish basketball player, playing the point guard position.

== Clubs ==
- Joventut Badalona - EBA (Spain) - 2001/2002
- Joventut Badalona - EBA & ACB (Spain) - 2002/2004
- Melilla Baloncesto - LEB (Spain) - 2004/2005
- CB Prat - EBA (Spain) - 2004/2005
- CB Tarragona - LEB (Spain) - 2005/2007
- ViveMenorca - ACB (Spain) - 2007/2010
- CE Lleida Bàsquet - LEB (Spain) - 2010/present
