= Rudy Fernández (basketball) =

Spanish basketball player (born 1985)

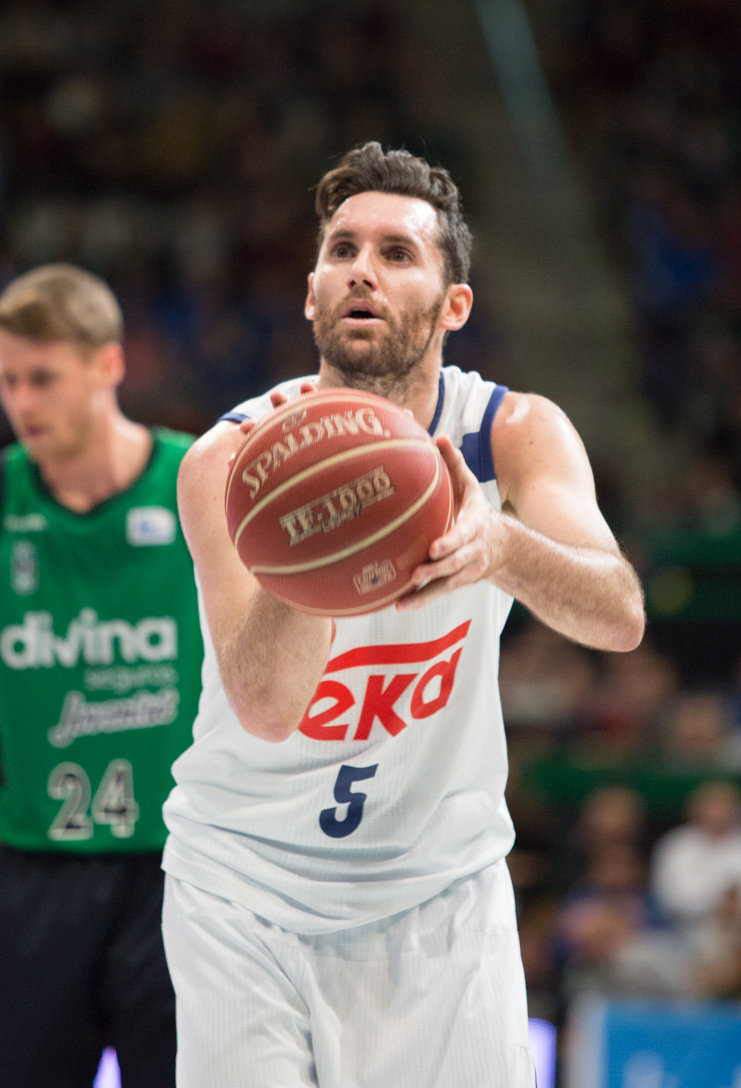
- Fernández with Real Madrid in 2016

Personal information
- Born: 4 April 1985 (age 41) Palma, Spain
- Listed height: 6 ft 5 in (1.96 m)
- Listed weight: 183 lb (83 kg)

Career information
- NBA draft: 2007: 1st round, 24th overall pick
- Drafted by: Phoenix Suns
- Playing career: 2002–2024
- Position: Small forward / shooting guard
- Number: 5

Career history
- 2002–2008: Joventut
- 2008–2011: Portland Trail Blazers
- 2011: Real Madrid
- 2011–2012: Denver Nuggets
- 2012–2024: Real Madrid

Career highlights
- 3× EuroLeague champion (2015, 2018, 2023); EuroLeague 25th Anniversary Team (2025); EuroCup champion (2008); FIBA EuroChallenge champion (2006); All-FIBA EuroCup Guard of the Year (2006); FIBA Intercontinental Cup champion (2015); 7× Liga ACB champion (2013, 2015, 2016, 2018, 2019, 2022, 2024); 7× Spanish King's Cup winner (2008, 2014–2017, 2020, 2024); 9× Spanish Supercup winner (2012–2014, 2018–2023); NBA All-Rookie Second Team (2009); 2× All-EuroLeague First Team (2013, 2014); All-EuroLeague Second Team (2015); EuroLeague Rising Star (2007); EuroCup Finals MVP (2008); FIBA EuroChallenge Final Four MVP (2006); Liga ACB Finals MVP (2018); 4× All-Liga ACB First Team (2007, 2008, 2013, 2014); Liga ACB Top Scorer (2008); Liga ACB Domestic Player of the Year (2018); Liga ACB Defensive Player of the Year (2008); Liga ACB Most Spectacular Player (2013); 3× Spanish King's Cup MVP (2004, 2008, 2015); Spanish Supercup MVP (2012); All-ULEB Cup Player of the Year (2008); All-ULEB Cup Guard of the Year (2008); FIBA Young Player of the Year (2006); Spanish Basketball Hall of Fame (2025)
- Stats at NBA.com
- Stats at Basketball Reference
Medals
Men's basketball
Representing Spain
Summer Olympics
Silver medal – second place	2008 Beijing	Team
Silver medal – second place	2012 London	Team
Bronze medal – third place	2016 Rio de Janeiro	Team
FIBA World Cup
Gold medal – first place	2006 Japan
Gold medal – first place	2019 China
FIBA Eurobasket
Gold medal – first place	2009 Poland
Gold medal – first place	2011 Lithuania
Gold medal – first place	2015 France–Croatia–Germany–Latvia
Gold medal – first place	2022 Czech Republic–Georgia–Italy–Germany
Silver medal – second place	2007 Spain
Bronze medal – third place	2013 Slovenia
FIBA Europe Under-16 Championship
Bronze medal – third place	2001 Latvia	Team

Rodolfo "Rudy" Fernández Farrés (Spanish pronunciation: [ˈruði feɾˈnandeθ]; born 4 April 1985) is a Spanish former professional basketball player who spent the majority of his career for Real Madrid of the Spanish Liga ACB and the EuroLeague. He is a 6 ft 5 in (1.96 m) tall swingman. He is a three-time All-EuroLeague Team selection and won the EuroLeague title in 2015, 2018 and 2023. During his stint in the National Basketball Association (NBA), he was an NBA All-Rookie Second Team member.

Fernández represented the senior Spanish national team internationally, and became the most capped player ever for Spain, with 266 matches. He has won two FIBA World Cup titles, in 2006 and 2019, two Olympic silver medals in 2008 and 2012, as well as a bronze medal at the 2016 Summer Olympics. He also won four EuroBasket titles in 2009, 2011, 2015 and 2022, a silver medal in 2007, and a bronze medal in 2013. Fernández earned an All-EuroBasket Team selection in 2009.

== Professional career ==
=== Joventut (2002–2008) ===
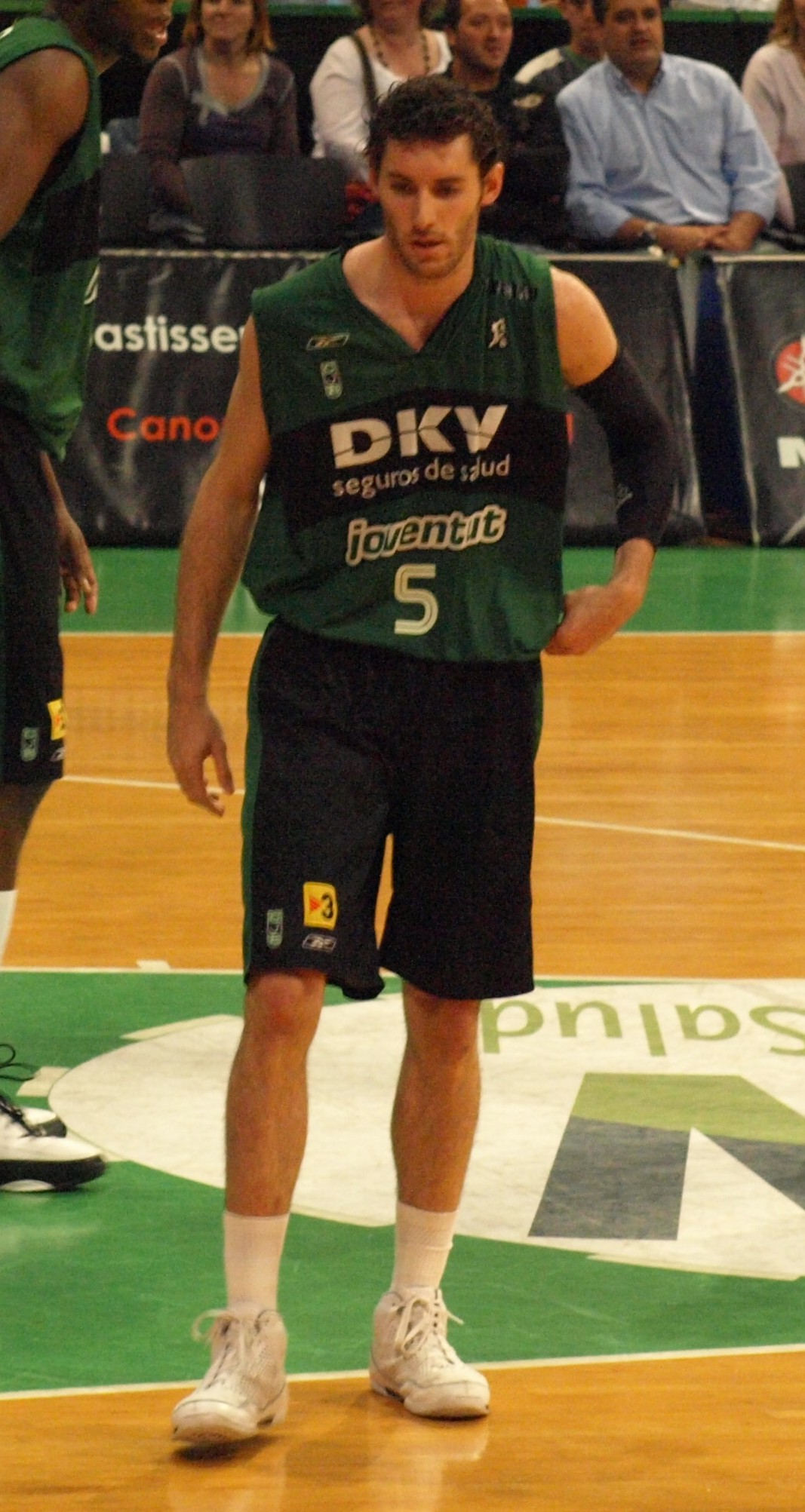
With DKV Joventut at the 2008 ACB Playoffs.

Rudy Fernández won the 2005 and 2007 Catalan Tournaments, the 2006 FIBA EuroChallenge championship, the 2008 Spanish King's Cup title, and the 2008 EuroCup championship, while playing with DKV Joventut of the Spanish ACB League.

He also won numerous personal awards while playing with DKV Joventut, such as the 2004 Spanish King's Cup MVP, the 2006 FIBA EuroChallenge Final Four MVP, the EuroLeague 2006–07 season's Rising Star award, the 2008 Spanish King's Cup MVP, the 2008 EuroCup Finals MVP, and the 2007 Catalan Tournament Final MVP.

He was also named the 2006 FIBA Europe Young Player of the Year. In July 2007, his contract with Joventut was extended through the year 2011, however his contract was bought out early in the year 2008 so that he could join the NBA. On his exit out of the club he paid tribute to his DKV coach, Aíto García Reneses, "All I know of basketball is thanks to Aíto García Reneses", he said.

=== Portland Trail Blazers (2008–2011) ===
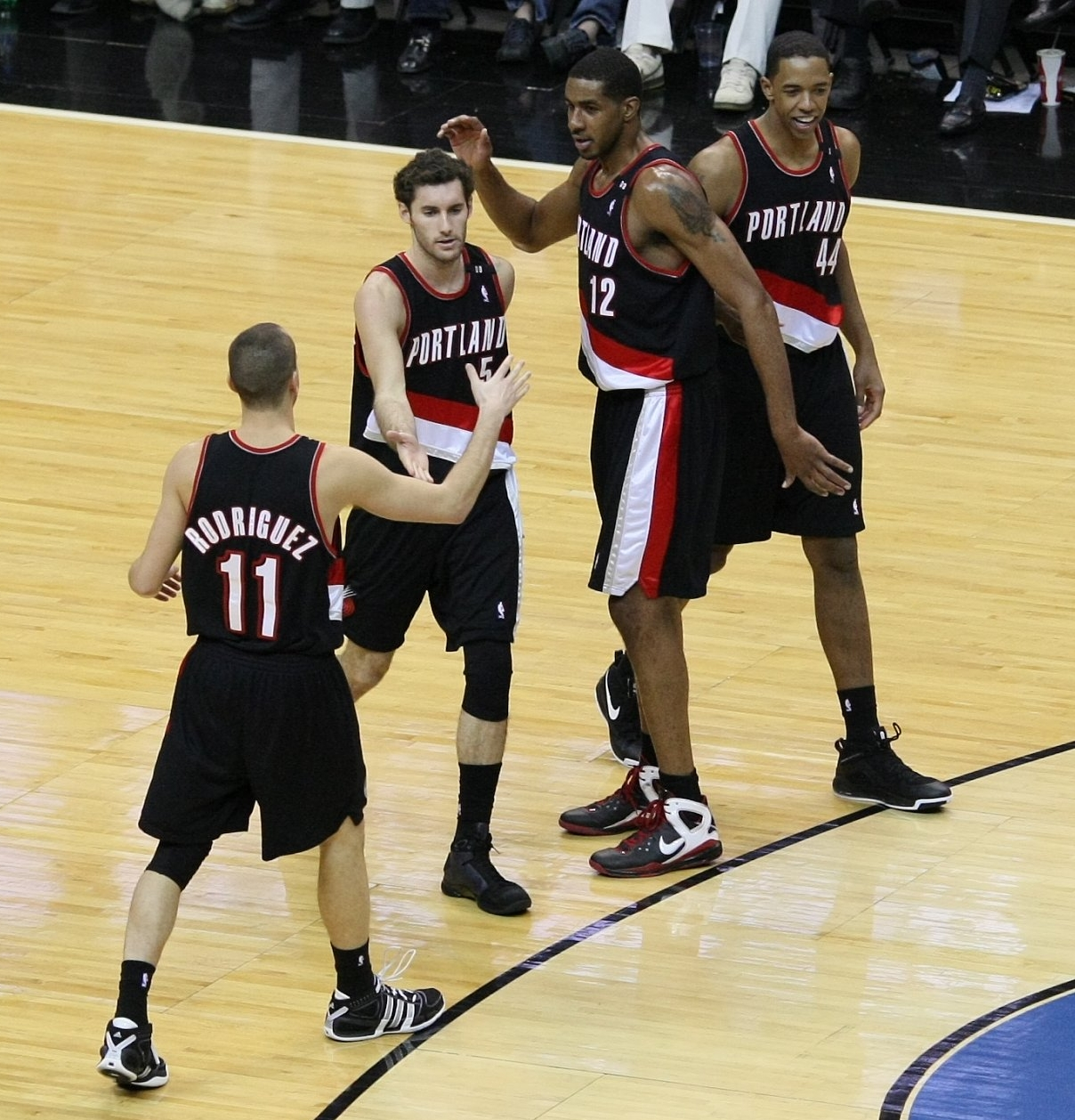
With the Trail Blazers in December 2008.

On 28 June 2007 Fernández was taken 24th overall in the NBA draft by the Phoenix Suns, who subsequently traded his draft rights along with James Jones to the Portland Trail Blazers for cash. Rudy Fernández announced at a press conference on Friday 6 June 2008 that he would leave DKV Joventut to join the Portland Trail Blazers for the 2008–09 NBA season, and he signed a contract with the Blazers on 1 July. "They [Portland] have shown a lot of interest in getting me and have assured me that I will be an important part in the team", he said. Fernández joined the NBA team on 22 September 2008. He became the eighth Spaniard to play in the NBA. For the 2008–09 NBA season he joined several other fellow Spaniards in the league that included Pau and Marc Gasol, Jose Calderón, and Trail Blazers teammate Sergio Rodríguez. He entered the NBA following his participation with the Spain national team at the 2008 Olympic basketball tournament in Beijing, China.

Fernández played in his first regular-season NBA game on 28 October 2008, coming off the bench to score 16 points in a 96–76 Portland loss to the Los Angeles Lakers. On 12 November 2008 Rudy scored 25 points in 29 minutes against the Miami Heat, including 8 of 8 from the free throw line adding to his already 92% FT shooting to set a new NBA career high. On 18 January 2009 it was announced that Fernández had won the fan voting and was picked the fourth dunker to go to the NBA Slam Dunk Contest as part of the 2009 All-Star Weekend. During the contest, he paid tribute to the late Trail Blazer Fernando Martín by wearing his #10 jersey. Fernández was eliminated in the first round of the competition, after what some thought was biased judging.

On 9 March 2009, against the Los Angeles Lakers, Fernández was taken off the court in a stretcher after Trevor Ariza hit him on the head on a fastbreak attempt. Fernández was alert and conscious when leaving the court with full movement of his extremities, however, he was taken to the hospital due to chest pain. He was released from the hospital the next day with a bruised chest and a right hip pointer.

Fernández was selected to the NBA All-Rookie Second Team on 30 April 2009. He set NBA rookie records for number of three-point field goals made (159), hitting a three-point field goal in 33 consecutive games, and making a three-pointer in his first 20 career NBA games.

On 16 October 2009 Blazers announced that they had exercised the third year of their option on Fernández's contract, keeping him with the team through the 2010–11 season.

In December 2009, Fernández underwent microdiscectomy surgery for a herniated disc that was causing leg pain.

On 20 August 2010 Fernández was fined $25,000 for "public statements detrimental to the NBA," a day after his agent publicly demanded a trade from the Blazers. On 17 December 2010 he hit 9-of-15 shots and four 3-pointers for a career-high 26 points with six assists in a 107–102 win against Minnesota. Fernandez along with teammate Patty Mills donated 50% of the proceeds from their jerseys sales, throughout the month of January, to help those affected by the floods in Australia. Fernández had a season-high eight assists on 22 January to go with 11 points, six rebounds and two steals in 37 minutes off the bench as a PG in the 97–92 win against Indiana. Disappointed Fernández and his team, for the third consecutive time, exited the first round of the playoffs, this time against the Dallas Mavericks. Fernández struggled offensively for a good part of the year, but his improved play in other areas of the game has earned him praise from his peers. Blazers head coach Nate McMillan, who isn't known to hand out compliments easily, singled out his defensive play in the second half of Game 4 against the Mavericks as the key to the 84–82 win.

=== Real Madrid (2011) ===
On 21 September 2011 Fernández signed a one-year contract with the Liga ACB team Real Madrid, valid only while a new NBA collective bargaining agreement remained under negotiation. Fernández signed for a reported salary of €2.7 million net income per season, the largest contract in Spanish league history, at that time. His deal also gave him the option to return to Real when his NBA contract ended.

=== Denver Nuggets (2011–2012) ===
During the 2011 NBA Draft Rudy Fernández was traded to the Mavericks in a three-team trade. However, he never played for the Mavericks, as he was traded with Corey Brewer to the Denver Nuggets on 13 December 2011. The Mavericks received a second-round draft pick and a traded player exception.

He played 31 games for Denver before suffering a season-ending back injury. In July 2012, Fernández announced he would not return to the NBA, opting for a 3-year deal with Real Madrid Baloncesto.

=== Return to Real Madrid (2012–2024) ===
On 4 July 2012 Fernández returned to Real Madrid by signing a three-year deal worth 9 million euros net income. In May 2014, alongside his teammate Sergio Rodríguez, he was named to the All-EuroLeague First Team of the EuroLeague, the second consecutive in his career.

On 14 August 2014 he signed a three-year extension with Real Madrid, to stay in the club until 2018. In May 2015, he was chosen to the All-EuroLeague Second Team for his performance during the season. Real Madrid won the EuroLeague 2014–15 season championship, after defeating Olympiacos, by a score of 78–59 in the final game. Real Madrid finished the season winning the Spanish League 2014–15 season championship, after a 3–0 series sweep in the ACB finals against Barcelona. With that trophy, they finished the season having won the triple crown.

In May 2018, Real Madrid won the 2017–18 EuroLeague championship, after defeating Fenerbahçe Doğuş in the final game with 85–80. Over 30 EuroLeague games, Fernández averaged 7.5 points, 2.6 assists and 2.4 rebounds per game. One month later, the club won the Spanish league after a 3–1 series win against Baskonia. Fernández was named MVP of the finals.

On 2 July 2018 he signed a two-year extension with Real Madrid, to stay in the club until 2020.

On 16 August 2024, Fernández retired from basketball.

== National team career ==
=== Junior national team ===
Fernández has been participating in international basketball competitions since he was sixteen years old. He played at the FIBA Europe Under-16 Championship and at the FIBA Europe Under-18 Championship with the Spain national junior teams.

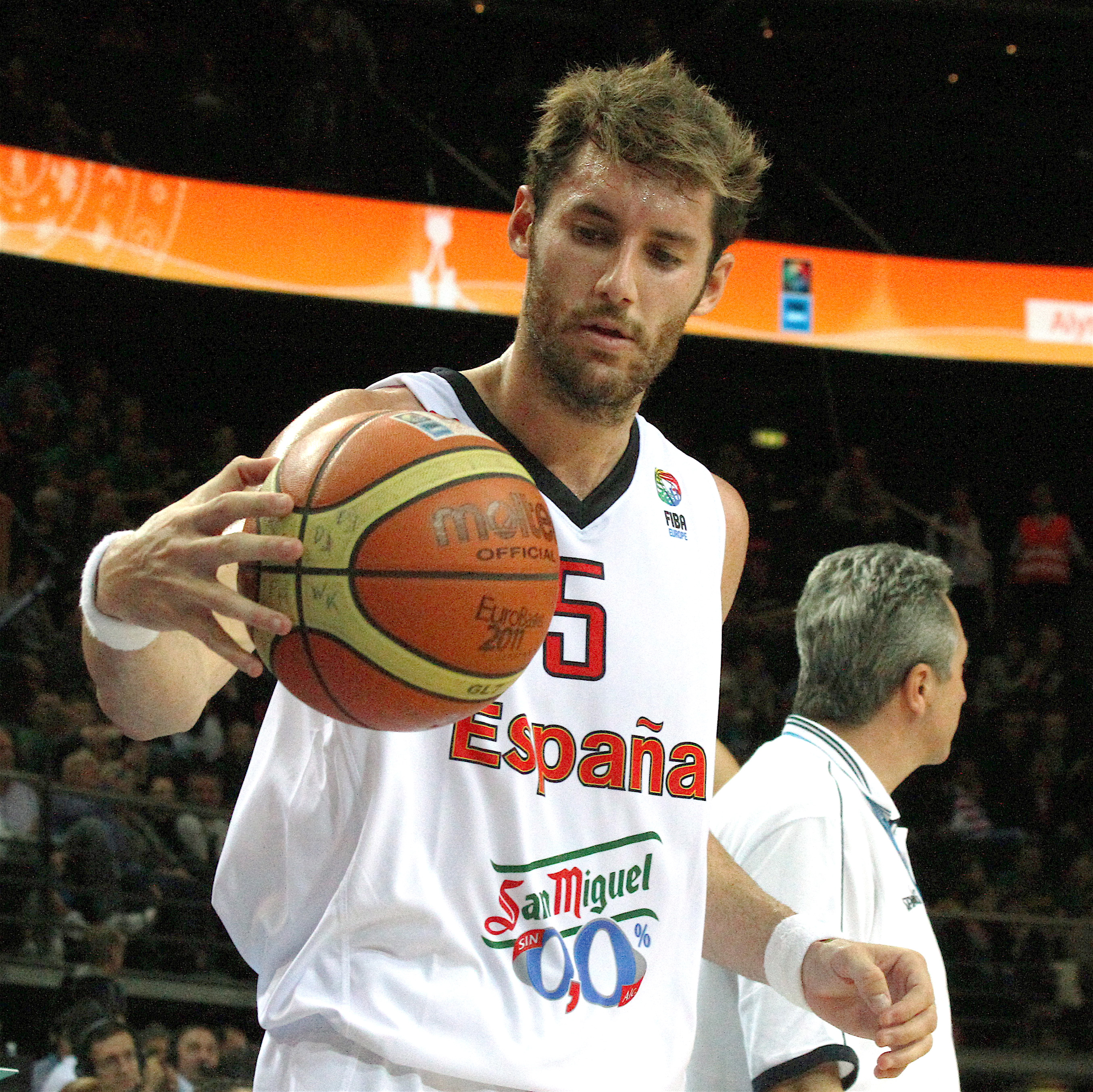
Rudy at the EuroBasket 2011.

=== Senior national team ===
As a member of the senior Spain national team, Fernández competed at the 2004 Summer Olympics, averaging 5.1 points per game, in 10.6 minutes per game. The next year, he played at the EuroBasket 2005, but his statistics were worse: 2.7 points per game, in 16.3 minutes, with a 31.6% FG% His third appearance with Spain's senior national team was at the 2006 FIBA World Championship, where he became an important player for the Spanish team, and contributed with 9.1 points, 2.3 rebounds, and 1.4 steals per game, to help his team win a gold medal.

He also played at the EuroBasket 2007, where Spain won the tournament's silver medal. During this tournament, Rudy averaged 9.9 points in 20.3 minutes per game. At the 2008 Summer Olympics, Spain lost to Team USA in the gold medal match. Fernández scored 22 points in 18 minutes of play, with 5 three-point goals, and completed a dunk over Dwight Howard that ESPN sportswriter Bill Simmons described as "hellacious". During the Olympics, Fernández had the following stats: 13.1 points, 3.5 rebounds, and 2.1 assists, in 22.3 minutes per game.

The EuroBasket 2009 in Poland was his sixth consecutive appearance with the Spain national team. Spain won its inaugural gold medal in a European Championship, and Fernández averaged 13.2 points, 3.5 rebounds, 2.1 assists, and 2.1 steals per game, in 28.4 minutes, and was named to the All-Tournament Team.

In the 2010 FIBA World Championship, Fernández averaged 15.6 points, 6.0 rebounds, 1.7 assists, and 1.8 steals per game, but Spain only took sixth place in the tournament. Fernández then participated in EuroBasket 2011, where Spain won the gold medal, and clinched a spot in the 2012 Summer Olympics, where he won a silver medal with Spain. He also played at EuroBasket 2013, where he won a bronze medal, at the 2014 FIBA Basketball World Cup, at EuroBasket 2015, where he won a gold medal, at the 2016 Summer Olympics, where he won a bronze medal, at the 2019 FIBA Basketball World Cup, where he won a gold medal, at the 2020 Summer Olympics, and at the EuroBasket 2022, where he won a gold medal.

At the Paris 2024 Olympic Games, he became the first male player to compete in six editions of the Olympic Games.

== Personal life ==
Fernández married Helen Lindes, his girlfriend of three years, on 4 July 2015. They live in Pozuelo de Alarcón, on the outskirts of Madrid. His older sister, Marta Fernández, played in the WNBA for the Los Angeles Sparks in 2007.

== Career statistics ==
Legend
GP	Games played	GS	Games started	MPG	Minutes per game
FG%	Field-goal percentage	3P%	3-point field-goal percentage	FT%	Free-throw percentage
RPG	Rebounds per game	APG	Assists per game	SPG	Steals per game
BPG	Blocks per game	PPG	Points per game	PIR	Performance index rating
**Bold**	Career high

=== NBA ===
==== Regular season ====
Year	Team	GP	GS	MPG	FG%	3P%	FT%	RPG	APG	SPG	BPG	PPG
2008–09	Portland	**78**	**4**	**25.6**	.425	**.399**	.839	**2.7**	2.0	.9	**.2**	**10.4**
2009–10	Portland	62	2	23.2	.378	.368	**.867**	2.6	2.0	1.0	**.2**	8.1
2010–11	Portland	**78**	3	23.3	.370	.321	.863	2.2	**2.5**	**1.1**	**.2**	8.6
2011–12	Denver	31	1	22.9	**.440**	.328	.698	2.1	2.4	1.0	.1	8.6
Career		249	10	24.0	.399	.360	.840	2.4	2.2	1.0	.2	9.1

==== Playoffs ====
Year	Team	GP	GS	MPG	FG%	3P%	FT%	RPG	APG	SPG	BPG	PPG
2009	Portland	**6**	1	**27.0**	.429	.421	**1.000**	**2.8**	1.0	**1.3**	**.5**	**7.5**
2010	Portland	**6**	**3**	19.8	**.444**	**.478**	.750	1.7	**1.3**	.2	.0	6.8
2011	Portland	**6**	0	13.5	.222	.300	.667	2.0	.8	.3	.2	2.8
Career		18	4	20.1	.388	.423	.792	2.2	1.1	.6	.2	5.7

=== EuroLeague ===
†	Denotes season in which Fernández won the EuroLeague
*	Led the league

Year	Team	GP	GS	MPG	FG%	3P%	FT%	RPG	APG	SPG	BPG	PPG	PIR
2006–07	Joventut	19	15	25.7	**.478**	**.429**	.814	3.8	1.7	**2.1**	.3	**15.8**	16.8
2011–12	Real Madrid	8	8	25.0	.385	.319	.895	3.1	2.3	1.3	.1	11.5	10.9
2012–13	Real Madrid	27	26	27.2	.429	.338	.802	3.9	3.1	1.5	**.4**	13.7	16.2
2013–14	Real Madrid	31*	**31***	**27.8**	.432	.353	.891	**4.4**	**3.3**	1.5	.2	13.2	**17.2**
2014–15†	Real Madrid	25	25	27.4	.416	.355	.892	3.4	**3.3**	1.5	.1	12.7	15.7
2015–16	Real Madrid	14	11	22.6	.372	.304	.731	2.4	1.9	.4	.1	7.6	6.6
2016–17	Real Madrid	32	7	23.3	.343	.323	.750	2.8	3.2	1.2	.1	6.5	8.4
2017–18†	Real Madrid	31	2	19.4	.382	.371	.879	2.5	2.6	.7	.2	7.4	9.0
2018–19	Real Madrid	31	7	20.5	.409	.414	.815	2.8	2.7	.8	.2	9.0	10.5
2019–20	Real Madrid	25	3	20.0	.392	.416	.771	2.0	2.0	1.0	.1	8.1	9.3
2020–21	Real Madrid	28	0	15.4	.342	.346	.846	1.1	1.2	.5	.1	5.5	4.5
2021–22	Real Madrid	**34**	0	18.5	.355	.327	.769	3.0	2.0	.9	.2	6.0	7.5
2022–23†	Real Madrid	20	0	17.4	.337	.299	**1.000**	2.2	1.5	.8	.2	4.3	4.3
2023–24	Real Madrid	24	0	15.4	.373	.365	.857	1.9	1.5	.9	.0	3.3	4.9
Career		349	135	21.6	.398	.359	.835	2.8	2.4	1.1	.2	8.7	10.2

== Awards and accomplishments ==
=== Pro career ===
- 3× Spanish King's Cup MVP: (2004, 2008, 2015)
- 2× Catalan Tournament Champion: (2005, 2007)
- FIBA EuroChallenge Champion: (2006)
- FIBA EuroChallenge Final Four MVP: (2006)
- FIBA Europe Young Player of the Year: (2006)
- EuroLeague Rising Star: (2007)
- 4× All-ACB Team: (2007, 2008, 2013, 2014)
- Catalan Tournament Final MVP: (2007)
- Spanish League Defensive Player of the Year: (2008)
- Spanish League Top Scorer: (2008)
- 6× Spanish King's Cup Winner: (2008, 2014, 2015, 2016, 2017, 2020)
- EuroCup Champion: (2008)
- EuroCup Finals MVP: (2008)
- Led Spanish League in steals: (2008)
- NBA All-Rookie Second Team: (2009)
- 3× Spanish Supercup Winner: (2012, 2013, 2014)
- Spanish Supercup MVP: (2012)
- 2× All-EuroLeague First Team: (2013, 2014)
- 7× EuroLeague MVP of the Round
- Spanish League Most Spectacular Player (KIA Award): (2013)
- 6× Spanish ACB League Champion: (2013, 2015, 2016, 2018, 2019, 2024)
- 3× EuroLeague Champion: (2015, 2018, 2023)
- FIBA Intercontinental Cup Champion: (2015)
- ACB Finals Most Valuable Player Award: (2018)

=== Spanish junior national team ===
- 2001 FIBA Europe Under-16 Championship: Bronze

=== Spanish senior national team ===
- 2006 FIBA World Championship: Gold
- EuroBasket 2007: Silver
- 2008 Summer Olympics: Silver
- EuroBasket 2009: Gold
- EuroBasket 2009: All-Tournament Team
- EuroBasket 2011: Gold
- 2012 Summer Olympics: Silver
- EuroBasket 2013: Bronze
- EuroBasket 2015: Gold
- 2016 Summer Olympics: Bronze
- 2019 FIBA World Championship: Gold
- EuroBasket 2022: Gold

== See also ==
- List of European basketball players in the United States
