= Demond Mallet =

American basketball player

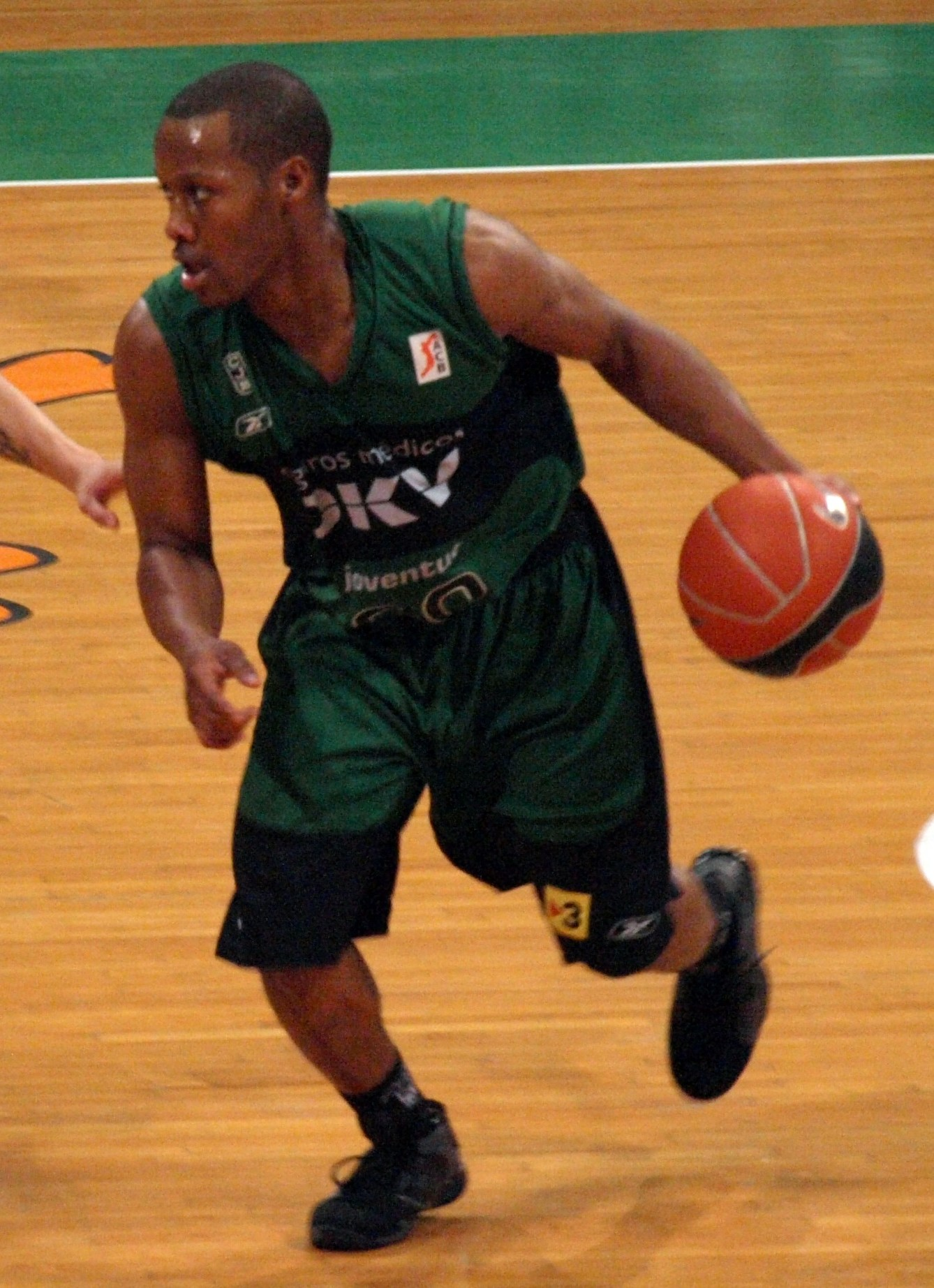
- Mallet with Joventut in 2009

Personal information
- Born: February 22, 1978 (age 48) Leesville, Louisiana, U.S.
- Listed height: 6 ft 1 in (1.85 m)
- Listed weight: 195 lb (88 kg)

Career information
- High school: Leesville (Leesville, Louisiana)
- College: McNeese State (1997–2001)
- NBA draft: 2001: undrafted
- Playing career: 2001–2017
- Position: Point guard
- Number: 0, 7, 5, 20, 99, 55, 12, 9, 11

Career history
- 2001–2004: Energy Braunschweig
- 2004–2006: GHP Bamberg
- 2006–2007: Rhein-Energie Cologne
- 2007–2009: Joventut Badalona
- 2009–2010: Türk Telekom
- 2010–2011: Spirou Charleroi
- 2011–2012: Maccabi Tel Aviv
- 2012: Spirou Charleroi
- 2012–2013: Artland Dragons
- 2013–2014: Spirou Charleroi
- 2014–2016: Joventut Badalona
- 2017: SLUC Nancy

Career highlights
- ULEB Cup champion (2008); German League champion (2005); German Cup winner (2007); German Cup MVP (2007); Belgian League champion (2011); Belgian League MVP (2011); Spanish Cup winner (2008); Israeli Cup winner (2012); Southland Player of the Year (2001); 3× First-team All-Southland (1998, 1999, 2001)

Dayon Demond Mallet (born February 22, 1978) is an American former professional basketball player. He played college basketball at McNeese State University. Mallet spent 17 seasons as a professional player, in multiple European leagues afterwards, and won multiple championships and was named the Most Valuable Player of several competitions.

Mallet won a German League championship, and the German Cup title. He also won the ULEB Cup championship (which is now called the EuroCup), and he won the prestigious Spanish King's Cup title, with the team Joventut Badalona. Joventut later honored Mallet in his last game with the team. Mallet also won the Belgian League MVP in 2011, and the Belgium League championship that same year.

== High school ==
Mallet attended Leesville High, in Leesville, Louisiana, where he played high school basketball.

== College career ==
After high school, Mallet enrolled at McNeese State University, where he played college basketball with the McNeese State Cowboys. He was an NCAA Division I All-American Honorable Mention in 2001. He was also named the Southland Conference's Player of the Year, of the 2000–01 season. Mallet was inducted in the McNeese State University Hall of Fame in 2012.

== Professional career ==
After college, Mallett played in the 2001 NBA Summer League with the Detroit Pistons' summer league squad. He also played in the 2002 NBA Summer League with the summer league squad of the Boston Celtics. Mallet played several years in Germany in the Bundesliga, the country's premier basketball league, but later moved to Spain, and then Turkey; and in 2010, Belgium, where he signed a two-year contract.

In December 2011, he moved from the Belgium club, during the 2011–12 season, where he was rated as one of the best point guards in the EuroLeague that season, to Maccabi Tel Aviv, in Israel, with whom he signed a one-year contract. In April 2012, after not getting enough playing time in the rotation of Maccabi Tel Aviv, he returned to Spirou Charleroi, through the end of the 2011–12 season. The following year, Mallet signed a two-year deal with the Artland Dragons, which was rumored to be the largest contract ever given to a point guard in the German Basketball League. He returned to Spirou again, after that season, and then became a player of FIATC Joventut, where he worked as a player-coach. Mallet was honored by Joventut, at the club's arena, on May 22, 2016, with a banner and retirement of his jersey, for all of his accomplishments with the club.

On January 10, 2017, Mallet signed with the French club SLUC Nancy, for the rest of the 2016–17 Pro A season. After last playing in 2017, he officially announced his retirement from playing professional basketball, in February 2018, and on February 23, 2018, Mallet was honored in ceremony by Brose Bamberg, the club he helped win their first championship to enter the Euroleague.

== Awards and accomplishments ==
=== College ===
- Southland Player of the Year: (2001)
- All-American Honorable Mention: (2001)

=== Professional ===
- 5× German League All-Star: (2002, 2004, 2005, 2006, 2007)
- German League Champion: (2005)
- German League All-Star Game MVP: (2007)
- German Cup Winner: (2007)
- German Cup MVP: (2007)
- Spanish King's Cup Winner: (2008)
- EuroCup Champion: (2008)
- Belgian League MVP: (2011)
- Belgian League Champion: (2011)
- Israeli State Cup Winner: (2012)
