= Sergi Vidal =

Spanish basketball player

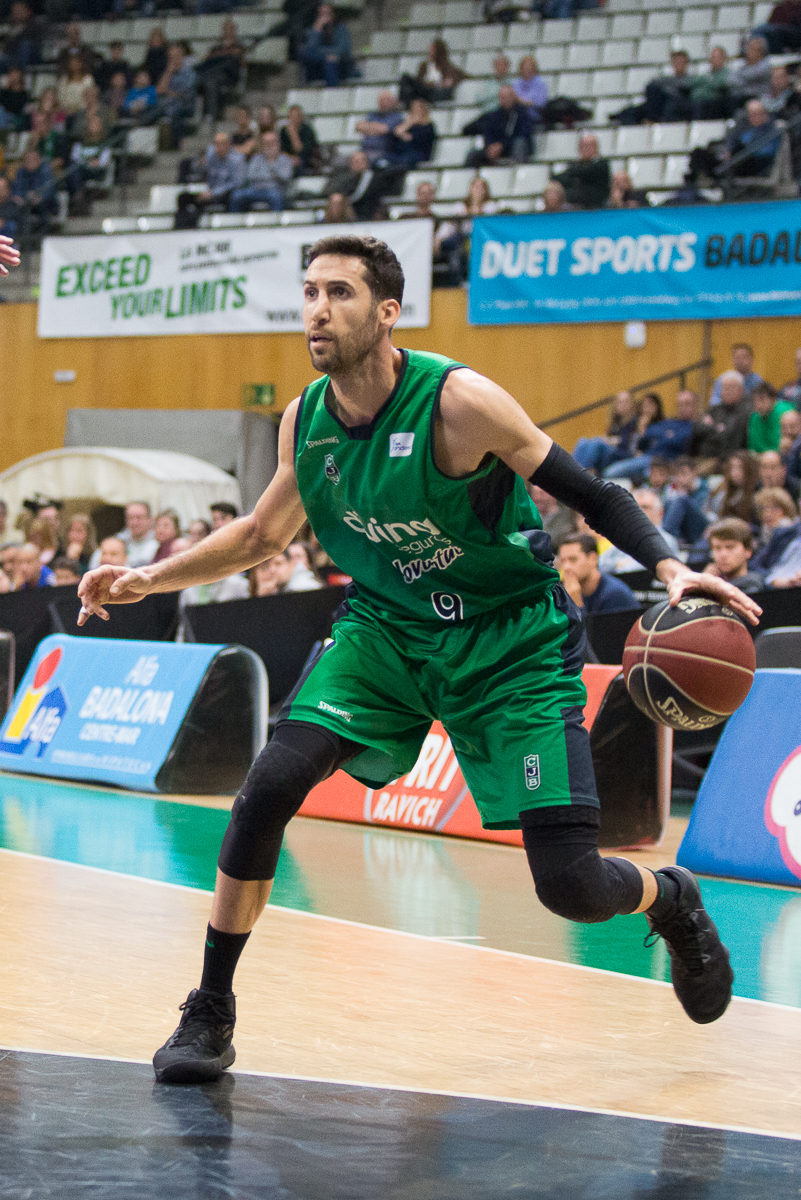
- Vidal with Joventut in 2017

Personal information
- Born: 9 April 1981 (age 44) Badalona, Spain
- Listed height: 2.02 m (6 ft 8 in)
- Listed weight: 91 kg (201 lb)

Career information
- Playing career: 1999–2019
- Position: Shooting guard / small forward

Career history
- 1999–2000: Joventut
- 2000–2009: Baskonia
- 2009–2011: Real Madrid
- 2011–2012: Gipuzkoa
- 2012–2014: Málaga
- 2014–2018: Joventut
- 2018–2019: Breogán
- 2019: Fuenlabrada
- 2019: Manresa

Career highlights
- 2× Liga ACB champion (2002, 2008); 4× Spanish Cup winner (2002, 2004, 2006, 2009); 4× Spanish Supercup winner (2005–2008); All-Liga ACB Team (2012); No. 9 retired by Saski Baskonia

Sergi Vidal Plana (born 9 April 1981) is a Spanish retired professional basketball player, who played at the shooting guard and small forward positions.

== Professional career ==
Vidal signed with the Spanish League giants Real Madrid in August 2009, after having spent nine years with Baskonia, the club with which he was the team captain. On 13 September 2018 he parted ways with Divina Seguros Joventut and in the next day, he signed with Cafés Candelas Breogán.

On 23 September 2019 he signed with Montakit Fuenlabrada of the Liga ACB.

Finally, on 17 December 2019, Vidal announced his retirement from professional basketball.

== Spain national team ==
Vidal was a member of the senior Spain national basketball team at the 2005 FIBA EuroBasket.

== Career statistics ==
Legend
GP	Games played	GS	Games started	MPG	Minutes per game
FG%	Field-goal percentage	3P%	3-point field-goal percentage	FT%	Free-throw percentage
RPG	Rebounds per game	APG	Assists per game	SPG	Steals per game
BPG	Blocks per game	PPG	Points per game	PIR	Performance index rating
**Bold**	Career high

=== EuroLeague ===
*	Led the league

Year	Team	GP	GS	MPG	FG%	3P%	FT%	RPG	APG	SPG	BPG	PPG	PIR
2000–01	Baskonia	14	1	6.3	.250	.222	.500	.4	.2	.4	—	1.4	0.1
2001–02	Baskonia	16	7	17.9	.357	.200	.625	1.1	1.1	1.2	.1	3.9	4.6
2002–03	Baskonia	17	10	**37.8**	.478	.214	.763	2.5	1.0	1.2	**.2**	5.6	7.0
2003–04	Baskonia	20	11	25.5	.429	.270	.776	**3.6**	1.7	1.3	.1	7.2	9.9
2004–05	Baskonia	24	**15**	22.1	.415	.310	.815	2.6	1.8	1.3	.0	5.6	8.3
2005–06	Baskonia	21	4	16.5	.451	.407	.696	2.9	1.3	.8	—	4.3	6.1
2006–07	Baskonia	12	3	19.1	**.522**	.417	.739	2.1	1.9	**1.4**	—	6.3	9.7
2007–08	Baskonia	**25***	9	19.3	.422	.341	.729	2.0	1.8	.8	—	4.8	6.7
2008–09	Baskonia	19	2	25.0	.490	**.533**	**.867**	3.2	**1.9**	.8	.1	**8.6**	**10.9**
2009–10	Real Madrid	11	0	12.0	.500	.375	.500	1.3	.5	.4	—	2.2	3.1
2010–11	Real Madrid	11	0	6.5	.313	.222	.667	1.0	.2	.3	—	1.5	1.5
2012–13	Málaga	18	6	20.6	.415	.405	.833	2.6	1.7	.6	.1	4.5	5.5
2013–14	Málaga	18	1	11.6	.368	.250	.769	1.1	1.3	.3	—	2.4	3.3
Career		226	69	18.0	.431	.351	.751	2.1	1.4	.8	—	4.7	6.3
