= Carlos Cabezas =

Spanish basketball player (born 1980)

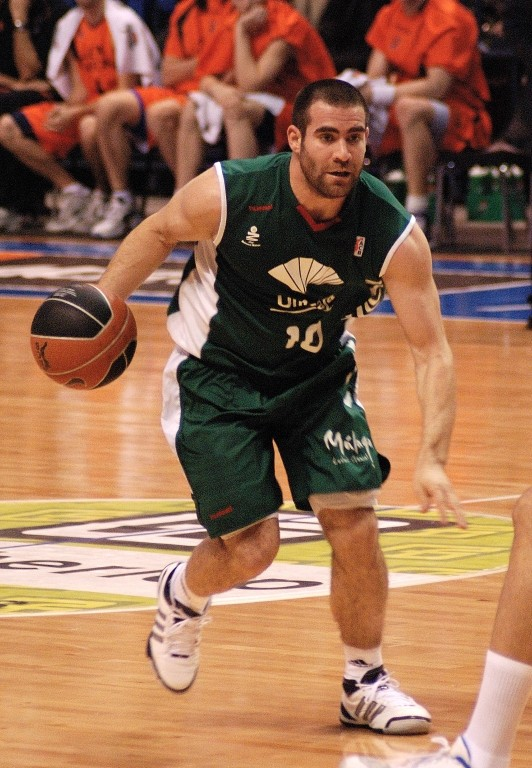
- Cabezas with Unicaja Málaga in 2008

Personal information
- Born: November 14, 1980 (age 46) Málaga, Andalusia, Spain
- Listed height: 6 ft 1.75 in (1.87 m)
- Listed weight: 205 lb (93 kg)

Career information
- NBA draft: 2002: undrafted
- Playing career: 1998–2021
- Position: Point guard
- Number: 6, 10, 16

Career history
- 1998–2000: Unicaja Macías
- 2000: Círculo Badajoz
- 2000–2009: Unicaja Málaga
- 2009–2010: Khimki Moscow Region
- 2010–2012: CAI Zaragoza
- 2012–2013: Caja Laboral
- 2013–2014: Baloncesto Fuenlabrada
- 2014–2016: UCAM Murcia
- 2016: Baloncesto Fuenlabrada
- 2016–2017: Orléans Loiret Basket
- 2017: Real Betis Energía Plus
- 2017–2018: Guaros de Lara
- 2018: Regatas Corrientes
- 2018–2019: Alba Fehérvár
- 2019–2021: Nacional

Career highlights
- Korać Cup winner (2001); Spanish League champion (2006); Spanish King's Cup winner (2005)
Medals
Representing Spain
Men's basketball
FIBA World Cup
Gold medal – first place	2006 Japan	Spain
EuroBasket
Silver medal – second place	2007 Spain	Spain
Gold medal – first place	2009 Poland	Spain
FIBA Under-19 Basketball World Cup
Gold medal – first place	1999 Portugal	U-19 Team
FIBA Europe Under-20 Championship
Bronze medal – third place	2000 Macedonia	U-20 Team
FIBA Europe Under-18 Championship
Gold medal – first place	1998 Bulgaria	U-18 Team

Carlos Eduardo Cabezas Jurado (born November 14, 1980) is a Spanish former professional basketball player. He is the nephew of the former Uruguayan professional footballer Hugo Cabezas, who played in Spain in the late 70s. His father (Hugo's brother), and his grandfather, are also former Uruguayan professional basketball players. He is a 1.87 m (6 ft 1 ¾ in) tall point guard.

== Professional career ==
Cabezas began his playing career with the youth teams of Unicaja Málaga in Spain. He made his professional debut during the 1998–99 season with Unicaja Macías, the reserve team of Unicaja Málaga, in the Spanish EBA League (Spanish 2nd division). He then moved to the LEB club Circulo Badajoz during the 1999–00 season. He joined the senior top-tier level Spanish ACB League club Unicaja Málaga in 2000.

The Orlando Magic of the NBA invited Cabezas to play for their NBA Summer League team at the Orlando Pro Summer League in 2009, but he declined the offer. He joined the Russian Super League club Khimki Moscow Region in 2009. In October 2010, he signed a one-year contract with Spanish club CAI Zaragoza.

On September 1, 2012, Cabezas signed with the EuroLeague club Caja Laboral. He left the club in February, officially due to technical reasons, but several media sources claimed he was fired by the club.

On August 3, 2016, he signed with Spanish club Baloncesto Fuenlabrada. On October 26, 2016, he parted ways with Fuenlabrada. On November 9, 2016, he signed a short-term deal with French club Orléans Loiret Basket. On April 15, 2017, Cabezas signed with the Spanish team Real Betis Energía Plus for the rest of the season.

In November 2017, he signed with Guaros de Lara.

On August 31, 2021, Cabezas announced his retirement from professional basketball.

== Spain national team ==
With the junior national teams of Spain, Cabezas won the gold medal at the 1998 FIBA Europe Under-18 Championship, the gold medal at the 1999 FIBA Under-19 World Championship, and the bronze medal at the 2000 FIBA Europe Under-20 Championship. He also played at the 2001 FIBA Under-21 World Championship.

He played with the senior Spain national basketball team at the EuroBasket 2005. Cabezas won the gold medal with the senior Spain national basketball team, at the 2006 FIBA World Championship. He also won the silver medal at the EuroBasket 2007, and the gold medal at the EuroBasket 2009.
