= 2013–14 FC Barcelona Bàsquet season =

Spanish basketball club season

FC Barcelona
2013–14 season
- Chairman: Sandro Rosell (August–January); Josep Maria Bartomeu (January–June)
- Head coach: Xavier Pascual
- Arena: Palau Blaugrana
- Euroleague: Third place
- ACB: Winners
- Copa del Rey: Runners-up
- Supercopa: Runners-up
- Highest home attendance: 7,537 vs Real Madrid (26 June 2014)
- Average home attendance: 5,116 (in EuroLeague); 4,909 (in Liga ACB)
- Biggest win: 109–50 vs CB Valladolid (15 December 2013)
- Biggest defeat: 62–100 vs Real Madrid (16 May 2014)
Home	Away

The 2013–14 season of FC Barcelona Bàsquet was the 50th season of the basketball club in the highest division of Spanish basketball and the 23rd season in the Liga ACB.

In the 2013–14 season, FC Barcelona competed in the Liga ACB, the Supercopa, the Copa del Rey and the EuroLeague.

== Players ==
=== Roster ===
Note: Flags indicate national team eligibility at FIBA-sanctioned events. Players may hold other non-FIBA nationalities not displayed.

FC Barcelona roster
Players
Coaches

Pos.	No.	Nat.	Name	Ht.	Wt.	Age
G	00	(Georgia (country))	Pullen, Jacob	1.83 m (6 ft 0 in)	91 kg (201 lb)	24 – 10 November 1989
PF/C	6	(United States)	Dorsey, Joey	2.06 m (6 ft 9 in)	125 kg (276 lb)	30 – 16 December 1983
PG	8	(Spain)	Sada, Víctor	1.92 m (6 ft 4 in)	93 kg (205 lb)	30 – 8 March 1984
PG	9	(Brazil)	Huertas, Marcelinho	1.91 m (6 ft 3 in)	84 kg (185 lb)	31 – 25 May 1983
SG	10	(Spain)	Abrines, Álex	1.98 m (6 ft 6 in)	86 kg (190 lb)	20 – 1 August 1993
SG	11	(Spain)	Navarro, Juan Carlos (C)	1.92 m (6 ft 4 in)	90.5 kg (200 lb)	34 – 13 June 1980
PF/C	14	(Montenegro)	Todorović, Marko	2.08 m (6 ft 10 in)	113 kg (249 lb)	22 – 19 April 1992
SF	16	(Greece)	Papanikolaou, Kostas	2.04 m (6 ft 8 in)	107 kg (236 lb)	23 – 31 July 1990
G/F	23	(Croatia)	Hezonja, Mario	2.02 m (6 ft 8 in)	91 kg (201 lb)	19 – 25 February 1995
SG	24	(Spain)	Oleson, Brad	1.91 m (6 ft 3 in)	90.5 kg (200 lb)	31 – 11 April 1983
PF/C	25	(Slovenia)	Lorbek, Erazem	2.08 m (6 ft 10 in)	113 kg (249 lb)	30 – 21 February 1984
C	30	(Poland)	Lampe, Maciej	2.11 m (6 ft 11 in)	125 kg (276 lb)	29 – 5 February 1985
SF	34	(Slovenia)	Nachbar, Boštjan	2.07 m (6 ft 9 in)	102 kg (225 lb)	33 – 3 July 1980
C	44	(Croatia)	Tomić, Ante	2.18 m (7 ft 2 in)	120 kg (265 lb)	27 – 17 February 1987

Head coach

- (Spain) Xavier Pascual

Assistant coach(es)

- (Spain) Agustín Julbé
- (Spain) Iñigo Zorzano
- (Spain) David García

Legend

- (C) Team captain
- Injured

- Roster

=== Depth chart ===
Pos.	Starting 5	Bench 1	Bench 2
C	Ante Tomić	Joey Dorsey *	Maciej Lampe †
PF	Erazem Lorbek	Boštjan Nachbar	Marko Todorović †
SF	Kostas Papanikolaou	Álex Abrines ‡	Mario Hezonja ‡
SG	Juan Carlos Navarro †	Brad Oleson †
PG	Marcelinho Huertas	Víctor Sada †	Jacob Pullen

Notes: Blue † – homegrown player; Red * – overseas player; Green ‡ – youth player

=== In ===
No.	Pos.	Nat.	Name	Age	Moving from		Type	Ends	Transfer fee	Date	Source
16	SF	(Greece)	Kostas Papanikolaou	23	Olympiacos	(Greece)	Transfer	2016	€1,500,000	20 July 2013	
34	PF	(Slovenia)	Boštjan Nachbar	33	Brose Baskets	(Germany)	Free agency	2015	–	23 July 2013	
6	C	(United States)	Joey Dorsey	29	Gaziantep	(Turkey)	Free agency	2015	–	30 July 2013	
30	C	(Poland)	Maciej Lampe	28	Laboral Kutxa	(Spain)	Free agency	2016	–	3 August 2013	
00	G	(Georgia (country))	Jacob Pullen	23	Virtus Bologna	(Italy)	Free agency	2014	–	13 August 2013	

=== Out ===
No.	Pos.	Nat.	Name	Age	Moving to		Type	Transfer fee	Date	Source
32	PF/C	(Australia)	Nathan Jawai	26	Galatasaray	(Turkey)	Parted ways	–	5 June 2013	
13	PG	(Lithuania)	Šarūnas Jasikevičius	37	Žalgiris	(Lithuania)	End of contract	–	1 July 2013	
20	G/F	(Australia)	Joe Ingles	25	Maccabi Tel Aviv	(Israel)	End of contract	–	1 July 2013	
21	PF/C	(Greece)	Loukas Mavrokefalidis	28	Panathinaikos	(Greece)	End of contract	–	1 July 2013	
33	SF	(United States)	Pete Mickeal	35	UCAM Murcia	(Spain)	End of contract	–	1 July 2013	
18	PF/C	(United States)	CJ Wallace	30	Olimpia Milano	(Italy)	End of contract	–	1 July 2013	
22	G/F	(Spain)	Xavi Rabaseda	24	Estudiantes	(Spain)	Parted ways	–	22 August 2013	

== Pre-season and friendlies ==
=== Friendly matches ===
7 September 2013 Torneig BBVA	FC Barcelona	60–49	FIATC Joventut	Sant Julià de Vilatorta
20:00	Scoring by quarter: 19–7, 16–12, 11–20, 14–10
	Pts: Abrines 14	Report	Pts: Barrera, Shurna 8	Arena: Pavelló Esportiu Municipal; Attendance: 1,000; Referees: Martín Bertrán, Guirao, Aliaga

14 September 2013 III Torneu CE Sant Nicolau	La Bruixa d'Or Manresa	70–76	FC Barcelona	Sabadell
12:00	Scoring by quarter: 11–24, 19–18, 22–16, 18–18
	Pts: Arteaga 14	Report	Pts: Abrines 16	Arena: Pavelló Nord; Attendance: 800; Referees: Perea, Guirao, Cardús

20 September 2013 Euro Hoop Series	Victoria Libertas	86–87	FC Barcelona	Pesaro
19:00	Scoring by quarter: 21–24, 26–25, 20–19, 19–19
		Report	Pts: Dorsey 21	Arena: Vitrifrigo Arena

21 September 2013 Euro Hoop Series	Granarolo Bologna	92–111	FC Barcelona	Pesaro
21:00	Scoring by quarter: 21–26, 28–23, 28–34, 15–28
	Pts: Hardy 24	Report	Pts: Dorsey 29	Arena: Vitrifrigo Arena

26 September 2013	FC Bayern Munich	78–85	FC Barcelona	Munich
	Scoring by quarter: 14–22, 24–21, 12–22, 28–20
	Pts: Đedović 14	Report	Pts: Lampe 19	Arena: Audi Dome

29 September 2013	FC Barcelona	98–64	Baloncesto Fuenlabrada	Tàrrega
21:00
	Pts: Pullen 19	Report		Arena: Pavelló Municipal d'Esports

=== Lliga Catalana de Bàsquet ===
10 October 2013 Final	FC Barcelona	85–73	FIATC Joventut	Girona
21:00	Scoring by quarter: 18–20, 34–20, 15–4, 18–29
	Pts: Abrines 19; Rebs: Dorsey 7 Asts: Huertas 4 PIR: Abrines 22	Boxscore	Pts: Vives 22; Rebs: Kirksay 8 Asts: Vives 3 PIR: Vives 27	Arena: Pavelló Girona-Fontajau; Referees: Martín, Guirao, Munar

== Competitions ==
=== Overview ===
Competition	First match	Last match	Starting round	Final position	Record							
Competition	First match	Last match	Starting round	Final position	Pld	W	D	L	PF	PA	PD	Win %
Liga ACB	13 October 2013	26 June 2014	Round 1	Winners	45	35		10	3,693	3,300	+393	77.78
EuroLeague	17 October 2013	18 May 2014	Round 1	Third place	26	20		6	2,300	2,115	+185	76.92
Copa del Rey	7 February 2014	9 February 2014	Quarterfinals	Runners-up	3	2		1	267	218	+49	66.67
Supercopa	4 October 2013	5 October 2013	Semifinals	Runners-up	2	1		1	177	156	+21	50.00
Total					76	58	0	18	6,437	5,789	+648	76.32

Last updated: 18 November 2025
Source: Competitions

=== Liga ACB ===
==== League table ====
Pos	Team	Pld	W	L	PF	PA	PD	Qualification or relegation
1	Real Madrid	34	32	2	3001	2480	+521	Qualification to playoffs
2	Valencia Basket	34	30	4	2930	2554	+376	Qualification to playoffs
3	FC Barcelona	34	27	7	2785	2382	+403	Qualification to playoffs
4	Unicaja	34	23	11	2745	2467	+278	Qualification to playoffs
5	Herbalife Gran Canaria	34	22	12	2595	2430	+165	Qualification to playoffs

Source: ACB

==== Results summary ====
Overall						Home					Away				
Pld	W	L	PF	PA	PD	W	L	PF	PA	PD	W	L	PF	PA	PD
34	27	7	2785	2382	+403	16	1	1430	1127	+303	11	6	1355	1255	+100

Source: Competitive matches

==== Results by round ====
Round	1	2	3	4	5	6	7	8	9	10	11	12	13	14	15	16	17	18	19	20	21	22	23	24	25	26	27	28	29	30	31	32	33	34
Ground	H	A	A	H	H	A	A	H	H	H	A	H	A	A	H	H	A	A	H	A	A	A	H	A	H	A	H	A	H	H	A	H	A	H
Result	W	W	W	W	W	L	L	W	L	W	W	W	L	L	W	W	W	L	W	W	W	W	W	W	W	L	W	W	W	W	W	W	W	W
Position	9	6	4	3	3	4	5	4	5	3	3	3	3	4	4	3	3	3	3	3	3	3	3	3	3	3	3	3	3	3	3	3	3	3

Source: Competitive matches
A = Away; H = Home; W = Win; L = Loss; R = Rest

==== Matches ====
13 October 2013 1	FC Barcelona	76–75	Valencia Basket	Barcelona
18:00	Scoring by quarter: 18–15, 16–30, 29–14, 13–16
	Pts: Papanikolaou 14; Rebs: Lampe 7 Asts: Huertas, Navarro 4 PIR: Dorsey, Lampe 21	Boxscore	Pts: Doellman 25; Rebs: Lishchuk 5 Asts: Lafayette 5 PIR: Doellman 23	Arena: Palau Blaugrana; Attendance: 4,902; Referees: Juan Carlos García González, Francisco Araña, Sergio Manuel

20 October 2013 2	FIATC Joventut	80–83	FC Barcelona	Badalona
12:30	Scoring by quarter: 24–16, 9–12, 25–19, 22–36
	Pts: Shurna 17; Rebs: Savané 7 Asts: Vives 8 PIR: Vives 16	Boxscore	Pts: Huertas 15; Rebs: Tomić 7 Asts: Huertas 7 PIR: Abrines 19	Arena: Olímpic de Badalona; Attendance: 7,619; Referees: Daniel Hierrezuelo, José Ramón García Ortiz, Antonio Sacristán

27 October 2013 3	La Bruixa d'Or Manresa	71–81	FC Barcelona	Manresa
12:30	Scoring by quarter: 18–20, 16–22, 22–18, 15–21
	Pts: Waters 19; Rebs: Arteaga, Waters 6 Asts: Waters 4 PIR: Waters 23	Boxscore	Pts: Tomić 20; Rebs: Hezonja 11; Asts: Huertas 4 PIR: Tomić 27	Arena: Nou Congost; Attendance: 4,627; Referees: Óscar Perea, Juan Luis Redondo, Rafael Serrano

3 November 2013 4	FC Barcelona	81–74	Gipuzkoa Basket	Barcelona
12:30	Scoring by quarter: 21–19, 16–22, 16–16, 28–17
	Pts: Huertas 21; Rebs: Tomić 7 Asts: Huertas 3 PIR: Huertas 23	Boxscore	Pts: Robinson 26; Rebs: Doblas 8 Asts: Neto 3 PIR: Robinson 23	Arena: Palau Blaugrana; Attendance: 4,279; Referees: Carlos Cortés, Carlos Sánchez Monserrat, David Soto

10 November 2013 5	FC Barcelona	87–71	Iberostar Tenerife	Barcelona
12:15	Scoring by quarter: 23–17, 25–24, 22–16, 17–14
	Pts: Tomić 16; Rebs: Dorsey 8 Asts: Huertas 6 PIR: Tomić 26	Boxscore	Pts: Richotti 14; Rebs: Sekulić 12; Asts: Úriz 4 PIR: Bivià, Sekulić 14	Arena: Palau Blaugrana; Attendance: 4,328; Referees: Vicente Bultó, Fernando Calatrava, Anna Cardús

17 November 2013 6	Bilbao Basket	80–72	FC Barcelona	Bilbao
12:40	Scoring by quarter: 13–18, 20–17, 21–22, 26–15
	Pts: Bertāns 16; Rebs: Bertāns 5 Asts: López 3 PIR: López 24	Boxscore	Pts: Papanikolaou 16; Rebs: Dorsey 8 Asts: Huertas 4 PIR: Papanikolaou 21	Arena: Bilbao Arena; Attendance: 9,824; Referees: Juan Carlos Arteaga, Luis Miguel Castillo, David Planells

23 November 2013 7	Rio Monbus Obradoiro	77–60	FC Barcelona	Santiago de Compostela
20:30	Scoring by quarter: 16–19, 16–13, 23–13, 22–15
	Pts: Corbacho 14; Rebs: Junyent 8 Asts: Xanthopoulos 5 PIR: Junyent 16	Boxscore	Pts: Nachbar 12; Rebs: Tomić 12; Asts: Huertas 3 PIR: Huertas 14	Arena: Fontes do Sar; Attendance: 5,436; Referees: Emilio Pérez Pizarro, Lluís Guirao, Sergio Manuel

1 December 2013 8	FC Barcelona	73–50	CAI Zaragoza	Barcelona
12:15	Scoring by quarter: 19–12, 21–13, 15–10, 18–15
	Pts: Tomić 17; Rebs: Tomić 13; Asts: Sada 5 PIR: Tomić 28	Boxscore	Pts: Llompart 8 Rebs: Sanikidze 6 Asts: Roll 2 PIR: Llompart 11	Arena: Palau Blaugrana; Attendance: 4,078; Referees: Antonio Conde, Juan Luis Redondo, Jordi Aliaga

8 December 2013 9	FC Barcelona	67–74	Unicaja	Barcelona
12:40	Scoring by quarter: 20–17, 17–26, 18–20, 12–11
	Pts: Navarro 20; Rebs: Tomić 12; Asts: Navarro 5 PIR: Tomić 26	Boxscore	Pts: Caner-Medley 12; Rebs: Caner-Medley, Vázquez 6 Asts: Granger, Urtasun 7 PIR: Caner-Medley 13	Arena: Palau Blaugrana; Attendance: 4,849; Referees: José Antonio Martín Bertrán, Carlos Cortés, Jorge Martínez

15 December 2013 10	FC Barcelona	109–50	CB Valladolid	Barcelona
12:30	Scoring by quarter: 23–19, 20–17, 22–18, 20–20
	Pts: Lorbek, Tomić 17; Rebs: Dorsey 10; Asts: Huertas 8 PIR: Tomić 28	Boxscore	Pts: Johnson 20; Rebs: Sinanović 5 Asts: Rowe 3 PIR: Johnson 17	Arena: Palau Blaugrana; Attendance: 3,471; Referees: Benjamín Jiménez, Francisco Araña, Andrés Fernández Sánchez

22 December 2013 11	Baloncesto Fuenlabrada	73–77	FC Barcelona	Fuenlabrada
12:15	Scoring by quarter: 13–16, 19–25, 17–19, 24–17
	Pts: Panko 25; Rebs: Arnold 8 Asts: Cabezas 8 PIR: Panko 21	Boxscore	Pts: Pullen 24; Rebs: Dorsey 5 Asts: Navarro 3 PIR: Pullen 25	Arena: Fernando Martín; Attendance: 4,943; Referees: Miguel Ángel Pérez Pérez, Carlos Sánchez Monserrat, Anna Cardús

27 December 2013 12	FC Barcelona	62–52	Herbalife Gran Canaria	Barcelona
19:30	Scoring by quarter: 18–9, 9–11, 15–15, 20–17
	Pts: Lorbek 12; Rebs: Dorsey 8 Asts: Huertas, Navarro 3 PIR: Dorsey 17	Boxscore	Pts: Báez 15; Rebs: Tavares 7 Asts: three players 2 PIR: Báez 19	Arena: Palau Blaugrana; Attendance: 5,595; Referees: Juan Carlos García González, Óscar Perea, Antonio Sacristán

29 December 2013 13	Real Madrid	98–84	FC Barcelona	Madrid
19:00	Scoring by quarter: 23–18, 25–18, 28–29, 22–19
	Pts: Fernández 18; Rebs: Mirotić, Slaughter 6 Asts: Rodríguez 6 PIR: Mirotić 20	Boxscore	Pts: Navarro 17; Rebs: Dorsey 8 Asts: Huertas 7 PIR: Navarro 21	Arena: WiZink Center; Attendance: 13,217; Referees: Daniel Hierrezuelo, Carlos Cortés, Jorge Martínez

4 January 2014 14	Laboral Kutxa	76–72	FC Barcelona	Vitoria-Gasteiz
21:00	Scoring by quarter: 26–20, 20–19, 11–14, 19–19
	Pts: Nocioni 19; Rebs: Hamilton 7 Asts: Heurtel 6 PIR: Nocioni 27	Boxscore	Pts: Tomić 12; Rebs: Papanikolaou 7 Asts: three players 3 PIR: Tomić 20	Arena: Buesa Arena; Attendance: 14,182; Referees: Antonio Conde, Carlos Peruga, Jacobo Rial

12 January 2014 15	FC Barcelona	96–63	UCAM Murcia CB	Barcelona
12:30	Scoring by quarter: 22–15, 26–18, 27–14, 21–16
	Pts: Pullen 18; Rebs: Abrines, Lorbek 5 Asts: Huertas 9 PIR: Abrines 23	Boxscore	Pts: Lima 19; Rebs: Lima 5 Asts: Grimau, Rodríguez 4 PIR: Lima 20	Arena: Palau Blaugrana; Attendance: 4,046; Referees: Miguel Ángel Pérez Pérez, Carlos Sánchez Monserrat, Juan José Martínez Díez

19 January 2014 16	FC Barcelona	73–56	Tuenti Móvil Estudiantes	Barcelona
12:30	Scoring by quarter: 27–21, 15–8, 16–19, 15–8
	Pts: Huertas, Navarro 13; Rebs: Tomić 10; Asts: Navarro 5 PIR: Navarro, Tomić 18	Boxscore	Pts: Colom 17; Rebs: Colom 6 Asts: Colom 7 PIR: Colom 25	Arena: Palau Blaugrana; Attendance: 4,911; Referees: Óscar Perea, Luis Miguel Castillo, Miguel Ángel Pérez Niz

26 January 2014 17	Cajasol	57–62	FC Barcelona	Seville
12:15	Scoring by quarter: 15–18, 19–16, 14–9, 9–19
	Pts: Sastre 15; Rebs: Balvín 11; Asts: Satoranský 5 PIR: Satoranský 20	Boxscore	Pts: Abrines 17; Rebs: Tomić 8 Asts: Huertas 8 PIR: Abrines 19	Arena: Deportes San Pablo; Attendance: 6,200; Referees: Vicente Bultó, José Ramón García Ortiz, Rubén Sánchez Mohedas

2 February 2014 18	Valencia Basket	95–93	FC Barcelona	Valencia
19:00	Scoring by quarter: 20–26, 18–25, 33–16, 24–26
	Pts: Dubljević 26; Rebs: Dubljević 7 Asts: Lafayette 7 PIR: Dubljević, Lafayette 26	Boxscore	Pts: Oleson 18; Rebs: Dorsey 5 Asts: Huertas, Sada 4 PIR: Oleson, Tomić 19	Arena: La Fonteta; Attendance: 8,500; Referees: Antonio Conde, Juan Luis Redondo, Andrés Fernández Sánchez

16 February 2014 19	FC Barcelona	88–79	FIATC Joventut	Barcelona
12:30	Scoring by quarter: 18–21, 25–26, 26–19, 19–13
	Pts: Nachbar 19; Rebs: Dorsey 10; Asts: Huertas 8 PIR: Lorbek 19	Boxscore	Pts: Shurna 14; Rebs: Kirksay 8 Asts: Vives 6 PIR: Savané, Shurna 15	Arena: Palau Blaugrana; Attendance: 6,003; Referees: Benjamín Jiménez, Lluís Guirao, Pedro Munar

23 February 2014 20	Iberostar Tenerife	56–78	FC Barcelona	San Cristóbal de La Laguna
19:00	Scoring by quarter: 15–20, 10–18, 10–18, 21–22
	Pts: Blanco, Richotti 10; Rebs: Fajardo 10; Asts: three players 2 PIR: Richotti 15	Boxscore	Pts: Abrines 14; Rebs: Tomić 10; Asts: Oleson 5 PIR: Navarro 14	Arena: Santiago Martín; Attendance: 4,558; Referees: Juan Carlos García González, Francisco Araña, Rubén Sánchez Mohedas

2 March 2014 21	Unicaja	69–74	FC Barcelona	Málaga
12:30	Scoring by quarter: 19–18, 17–18, 15–15, 18–23
	Pts: Suárez 15; Rebs: Sabonis 8 Asts: Granger 6 PIR: Granger 19	Boxscore	Pts: Oleson 11; Rebs: Tomić 8 Asts: Navarro 5 PIR: Tomić 19	Arena: Martín Carpena; Attendance: 7,900; Referees: Juan Carlos Arteaga, Fernando Calatrava, Jacobo Rial

8 March 2014 22	CB Valladolid	66–111	FC Barcelona	Valladolid
19:00	Scoring by quarter: 12–22, 13–31, 18–21, 23–37
	Pts: Johnson 16; Rebs: Johnson 4 Asts: Martínez, Pozas 2 PIR: Johnson 17	Boxscore	Pts: Pullen 42; Rebs: Dorsey, Lampe 7 Asts: Hezonja, Huertas 6 PIR: Pullen 41	Arena: Polideportivo Pisuerga; Attendance: 4,500; Referees: Benjamín Jiménez, Miguel Ángel Pérez Niz, Rafael Serrano

16 March 2014 23	FC Barcelona	91–63	La Bruixa d'Or Manresa	Barcelona
12:30	Scoring by quarter: 20–19, 24–10, 17–19, 30–15
	Pts: Hezonja 26; Rebs: Lampe, Lorbek 7 Asts: Sada 4 PIR: Hezonja 29	Boxscore	Pts: Eriksson, Monroe 11; Rebs: Monroe 9 Asts: Ljubičić 3 PIR: Goodridge 11	Arena: Palau Blaugrana; Attendance: 4,832; Referees: José Antonio Martín Bertrán, Óscar Perea, Juan de Dios Oyón

23 March 2014 24	Gipuzkoa Basket	75–86	FC Barcelona	San Sebastián
12:00	Scoring by quarter: 17–23, 14–27, 20–17, 24–19
	Pts: Robinson 34; Rebs: Doblas 4 Asts: Salgado 8 PIR: Robinson 34	Boxscore	Pts: Lampe 23; Rebs: Lampe 9 Asts: Navarro 4 PIR: Lampe 28	Arena: Donostia Arena; Attendance: 7,750; Referees: Miguel Ángel Pérez Pérez, Carlos Sánchez Monserrat, Juan José Martínez Díez

30 March 2014 25	FC Barcelona	104–75	Bilbao Basket	Barcelona
12:00	Scoring by quarter: 32–15, 22–22, 33–21, 17–17
	Pts: Lampe 19; Rebs: Lampe 9 Asts: Navarro 6 PIR: Lampe 28	Boxscore	Pts: Gabriel 18; Rebs: Gabriel 9 Asts: Grimau 2 PIR: Gabriel 19	Arena: Palau Blaugrana; Attendance: 3,821; Referees: Benjamín Jiménez, Luis Miguel Castillo, Andrés Fernández Sánchez

6 April 2014 26	CAI Zaragoza	85–79	FC Barcelona	Zaragoza
18:00	Scoring by quarter: 24–16, 18–15, 18–24, 25–24
	Pts: Tabu 19; Rebs: Sanikidze 8 Asts: Stefánsson 5 PIR: Sanikidze 24	Boxscore	Pts: Tomić 15; Rebs: Papanikolaou 10; Asts: Huertas, Navarro 6 PIR: Tomić 21	Arena: Pabellón Príncipe Felipe; Attendance: 9,882; Referees: Juan Carlos Arteaga, Fernando Calatrava, Jordi Aliaga

12 April 2014 27	FC Barcelona	77–62	Rio Monbus Obradoiro	Barcelona
18:00	Scoring by quarter: 21–6, 20–14, 14–23, 22–19
	Pts: Nachbar 20; Rebs: Navarro, Papanikolaou 6 Asts: Navarro, Sada 4 PIR: Nachbar 18	Boxscore	Pts: Delaš 20; Rebs: Delaš, Luz 4 Asts: Dewar, Luz 4 PIR: Delaš 20	Arena: Palau Blaugrana; Attendance: 3,659; Referees: Carlos Cortés, Carlos Sánchez Monserrat, Sergio Manuel

1 May 2014 28	Herbalife Gran Canaria	74–82	FC Barcelona	Las Palmas
12:30	Scoring by quarter: 23–19, 15–17, 18–23, 18–23
	Pts: Báez 15; Rebs: Martín 7 Asts: Bellas 4 PIR: Báez 16	Boxscore	Pts: Huertas 21; Rebs: Tomić 7 Asts: Huertas 4 PIR: Huertas 29	Arena: Gran Canaria Arena; Attendance: 9,332; Referees: Antonio Conde, Lluís Guirao, Miguel Ángel Pérez Niz

27 April 2014 29	FC Barcelona	81–63	Baloncesto Fuenlabrada	Barcelona
12:30	Scoring by quarter: 25–22, 21–13, 20–13, 15–15
	Pts: Pullen 14; Rebs: Dorsey 10; Asts: Huertas 4 PIR: Dorsey 21	Boxscore	Pts: Panko 19; Rebs: Panko 7 Asts: Feldeine 7 PIR: Feldeine 18	Arena: Palau Blaugrana; Attendance: 4,031; Referees: Benjamín Jiménez, Luis Miguel Castillo, David Planells

4 May 2014 30	FC Barcelona	91–75	Laboral Kutxa	Barcelona
19:00	Scoring by quarter: 18–13, 22–18, 24–21, 27–23
	Pts: Huertas 22; Rebs: Tomić 8 Asts: Tomić 5 PIR: Tomić 22	Boxscore	Pts: Nocioni 16; Rebs: Hanga, Pleiß 7 Asts: Poeta 7 PIR: Heurtel, Nocioni 17	Arena: Palau Blaugrana; Attendance: 4,158; Referees: Emilio Pérez Pizarro, José Ramón García Ortiz, Rubén Sánchez Mohedas

7 May 2014 31	UCAM Murcia CB	72–84	FC Barcelona	Murcia
21:00	Scoring by quarter: 20–26, 19–21, 13–26, 20–11
	Pts: Davis 17; Rebs: Davis, Tillie 8 Asts: Davis 3 PIR: Davis 21	Boxscore	Pts: Nachbar 17; Rebs: Dorsey 10; Asts: Huertas 5 PIR: Tomić 16	Arena: Palacio de Deportes; Attendance: 5,962; Referees: Juan Carlos García González, Juan Luis Redondo, Anna Cardús

10 May 2014 32	FC Barcelona	86–75	Real Madrid	Barcelona
18:00	Scoring by quarter: 21–10, 21–22, 30–18, 14–25
	Pts: Abrines 20; Rebs: Papanikolaou 12; Asts: Huertas 9 PIR: Papanikolaou 28	Boxscore	Pts: Mirotić 19; Rebs: Slaughter 8 Asts: Rodríguez 6 PIR: Mirotić 22	Arena: Palau Blaugrana; Attendance: 7,002; Referees: José Antonio Martín Bertrán, Carlos Peruga, Miguel Ángel Pérez Niz

21 May 2014 33	Tuenti Móvil Estudiantes	51–77	FC Barcelona	Madrid
20:45	Scoring by quarter: 20–14, 10–25, 11–17, 10–21
	Pts: Kuric 12; Rebs: Slokar 6 Asts: Colom, Van Lacke 3 PIR: Van Lacke 11	Boxscore	Pts: Abrines 15; Rebs: Huertas 6 Asts: Navarro, Papanikolaou 4 PIR: Abrines 17	Arena: Palacio Vistalegre; Attendance: 6,200; Referees: Vicente Bultó, Fernando Calatrava, Jordi Aliaga

25 May 2014 34	FC Barcelona	88–70	Cajasol	Barcelona
12:30	Scoring by quarter: 24–15, 17–18, 27–18, 20–19
	Pts: Abrines 29; Rebs: Lampe 9 Asts: Navarro 6 PIR: Abrines 23	Boxscore	Pts: Porziņģis 14; Rebs: Balvín, Landry 7 Asts: Satoranský 6 PIR: Balvín 18	Arena: Palau Blaugrana; Attendance: 3,934; Referees: Daniel Hierrezuelo, Lluís Guirao, Jorge Martínez

=== ACB Playoffs ===
==== Quarterfinals ====
29 May 2014 1	FC Barcelona	92–87	Laboral Kutxa	Barcelona
21:00	Scoring by quarter: 23–20, 13–23, 33–25, 23–19
	Pts: Oleson 29; Rebs: Dorsey 11; Asts: Navarro 5 PIR: Navarro, Oleson 31	Boxscore	Pts: Heurtel 23; Rebs: Hamilton 6 Asts: Heurtel 7 PIR: Heurtel 29	Arena: Palau Blaugrana; Attendance: 4,101; Referees: Juan Carlos Arteaga, Francisco Araña, Luis Miguel Castillo

31 May 2014 2	Laboral Kutxa	71–95	FC Barcelona	Vitoria-Gasteiz
21:15	Scoring by quarter: 19–21, 18–28, 12–20, 22–26
	Pts: Causeur, Nocioni 14; Rebs: Nocioni 8 Asts: Heurtel 3 PIR: Causeur 17	Boxscore	Pts: Lampe 14; Rebs: Dorsey 8 Asts: Abrines 5 PIR: Lampe 19	Arena: Buesa Arena; Attendance: 10,472; Referees: Antonio Conde, Vicente Bultó, Jorge Martínez

==== Semifinals ====
5 June 2014 1	Valencia Basket	58–77	FC Barcelona	Valencia
21:00	Scoring by quarter: 14–16, 19–19, 9–16, 16–26
	Pts: Ribas 12; Rebs: Sato 7 Asts: Ribas 5 PIR: Ribas 18	Boxscore	Pts: Nachbar, Tomić 15; Rebs: Huertas 8 Asts: Navarro, Sada 4 PIR: Tomić 20	Arena: La Fonteta; Attendance: 7,900; Referees: Daniel Hierrezuelo, Miguel Ángel Pérez Pérez, Carlos Cortés

7 June 2014 2	Valencia Basket	59–60	FC Barcelona	Valencia
21:00	Scoring by quarter: 22–12, 9–16, 12–18, 16–14
	Pts: Doellman 16; Rebs: Doellman 9 Asts: van Rossom 6 PIR: Doellman 26	Boxscore	Pts: Huertas 11; Rebs: Tomić 10; Asts: Huertas 5 PIR: Navarro 15	Arena: La Fonteta; Attendance: 8,200; Referees: Juan Carlos García González, Antonio Conde, José Ramón García Ortiz

10 June 2014 3	FC Barcelona	70–74	Valencia Basket	Barcelona
20:15	Scoring by quarter: 25–20, 17–12, 17–21, 11–21
	Pts: Dorsey 20; Rebs: Lampe 6 Asts: Huertas 4 PIR: Dorsey 23	Boxscore	Pts: Doellman 19; Rebs: Lishchuk 12; Asts: Doellman 8 PIR: Doellman 31	Arena: Palau Blaugrana; Attendance: 6,048; Referees: Daniel Hierrezuelo, Benjamín Jiménez, Francisco Araña

12 June 2014 4	FC Barcelona	63–81	Valencia Basket	Barcelona
22:00	Scoring by quarter: 16–20, 9–17, 16–24, 22–20
	Pts: Navarro 18; Rebs: Tomić 9 Asts: Navarro, Oleson 2 PIR: Navarro 20	Boxscore	Pts: van Rossom 17; Rebs: Lishchuk 8 Asts: Lafayette 4 PIR: Sato 19	Arena: Palau Blaugrana; Attendance: 5,079; Referees: Antonio Conde, José Ramón García Ortiz, Carlos Cortés

15 June 2014 5	Valencia Basket	75–77	FC Barcelona	Valencia
19:15	Scoring by quarter: 20–18, 23–16, 14–27, 18–16
	Pts: Doellman 18; Rebs: Sato 8 Asts: van Rossom 5 PIR: Sato 23	Boxscore	Pts: Huertas 22; Rebs: Tomić 8 Asts: Huertas 9 PIR: Huertas 31	Arena: La Fonteta; Attendance: 8,500; Referees: Daniel Hierrezuelo, Emilio Pérez Pizarro, Antonio Conde

==== Finals ====
19 June 2014 1	Real Madrid	93–98	FC Barcelona	Madrid
21:30	Scoring by quarter: 16–23, 28–25, 29–22, 20–28
	Pts: Fernández, Rodríguez 16; Rebs: Fernández 7 Asts: Fernández 8 PIR: Fernández 27	Boxscore	Pts: Nachbar, Tomić 17; Rebs: Tomić 11; Asts: Huertas 5 PIR: Tomić 22	Arena: WiZink Center; Attendance: 11,342; Referees: Antonio Conde, Miguel Ángel Pérez Pérez, Benjamín Jiménez

21 June 2014 2	Real Madrid	87–78	FC Barcelona	Madrid
22:00	Scoring by quarter: 24–14, 16–16, 18–21, 29–27
	Pts: Fernández 17; Rebs: Bourousis, Mejri 7 Asts: Rodríguez 8 PIR: Bourousis 23	Boxscore	Pts: Oleson 17; Rebs: Oleson, Tomić 6 Asts: Huertas 7 PIR: Oleson 20	Arena: WiZink Center; Attendance: 11,871; Referees: Daniel Hierrezuelo, Juan Carlos García González, Carlos Peruga

24 June 2014 3	FC Barcelona	94–79	Real Madrid	Barcelona
19:15	Scoring by quarter: 31–20, 21–20, 28–23, 14–16
	Pts: Navarro 19; Rebs: Dorsey 10; Asts: Huertas 8 PIR: Oleson 18	Boxscore	Pts: Llull 15; Rebs: Carroll 8 Asts: Llull, Rodríguez 3 PIR: Bourousis, Llull 14	Arena: Palau Blaugrana; Attendance: 7,328; Referees: Juan Carlos Arteaga, Emilio Pérez Pizarro, Vicente Bultó

26 June 2014 4	FC Barcelona	83–81	Real Madrid	Barcelona
19:15	Scoring by quarter: 25–19, 22–23, 18–15, 18–24
	Pts: Tomić 22; Rebs: Tomić 9 Asts: Huertas 7 PIR: Tomić 28	Boxscore	Pts: Fernández 13; Rebs: Bourousis, Darden 7 Asts: Llull, Rodríguez 3 PIR: Bourousis 17	Arena: Palau Blaugrana; Attendance: 7,537; Referees: Daniel Hierrezuelo, Miguel Ángel Pérez Pérez, José Ramón García Ortiz

=== EuroLeague ===
==== Results summary ====
Overall						Home					Away				
Pld	W	L	PF	PA	PD	W	L	PF	PA	PD	W	L	PF	PA	PD
24	19	5	1895	1738	+157	10	2	983	863	+120	9	3	912	875	+37

Last updated: 17 October 2025.
Source: Competitive matches

=== Regular season ===
==== Group A ====
Key to colors
Top four places advance to Top 16
Bottom two teams enter 2013–14 Eurocup Basketball Last 32 round

Pos	Team	Pld	W	L	PF	PA	PD	Tie
1	(Turkey) Fenerbahçe Ülker	10	8	2	849	749	+100	
2	(Russia) CSKA Moscow	10	7	3	732	676	+56	1–1 (+5)
3	(Spain) FC Barcelona	10	7	3	786	729	+57	1–1 (–5)
4	(Serbia) Partizan	10	3	7	668	715	−47	1–1 (+29)
5	(France) Nanterre	10	3	7	682	753	−71	1–1 (–29)
6	(Ukraine) Budivelnyk	10	2	8	737	832	−95	

==== Matches ====
17 October 2013 1	FC Barcelona (Spain)	67–60	(Serbia) Partizan NIS Belgrade	Barcelona
21:00	Scoring by quarter: 17–18, 11–8, 17–14, 22–20
	Pts: Papanikolaou, Tomić 13; Rebs: Dorsey 10; Asts: Huertas 10; PIR: Huertas 22	Boxscore	Pts: Milosavljević 15; Rebs: Lauvergne 13; Asts: Westermann 3 PIR: Lauvergne 15	Arena: Palau Blaugrana; Attendance: 4,850; Referees: Tolga Sahin, Anastasios Piloidis, Marcin Kowalski

25 October 2013 2	Fenerbahçe Ülker Istanbul (Turkey)	75–70	(Spain) FC Barcelona	Istanbul
19:00	Scoring by quarter: 24–17, 20–18, 22–17, 9–18
	Pts: Kleiza 22; Rebs: McCalebb 8 Asts: McCalebb, Preldžić 4 PIR: Kleiza 24	Boxscore	Pts: Navarro 18; Rebs: Tomić 9 Asts: Huertas, Tomić 4 PIR: Tomić 24	Arena: Ülker Sports and Event Hall; Attendance: 12,800; Referees: Luigi Lamonica, Eddie Viator, Tomasz Trawicki

31 October 2013 3	FC Barcelona (Spain)	67–71	(France) JSF Nanterre	Barcelona
20:45	Scoring by quarter: 25–15, 14–22, 21–14, 7–20
	Pts: Abrines 15; Rebs: Dorsey 11; Asts: three players 3 PIR: Dorsey 17	Boxscore	Pts: Thomas 14; Rebs: Thomas 7 Asts: Meacham 4 PIR: Thomas 15	Arena: Palau Blaugrana; Attendance: 4,079; Referees: Milivoje Jovcic, Elias Koromilas, Saso Petek

8 November 2013 4	FC Barcelona (Spain)	79–70	(Russia) CSKA Moscow	Barcelona
20:45	Scoring by quarter: 18–20, 17–20, 27–14, 17–16
	Pts: Navarro 20; Rebs: Dorsey 7 Asts: Huertas, Navarro 3 PIR: Navarro 25	Boxscore	Pts: Micov 14; Rebs: three players 5 Asts: Teodosić 7 PIR: Micov 16	Arena: Palau Blaugrana; Attendance: 6,102; Referees: Christos Christodoulou, Robert Lottermoser, Jakub Zamojski

14 November 2013 5	Budivelnyk Kyiv (Ukraine)	74–84	(Spain) FC Barcelona	Kyiv
20:45	Scoring by quarter: 21–24, 27–22, 8–16, 18–22
	Pts: Lavrinovič 21; Rebs: Lavrinovič, Summers 7 Asts: Downs, Minard 4 PIR: Lavrinovič 25	Boxscore	Pts: Tomić 18; Rebs: Lampe 9 Asts: Huertas 8 PIR: Dorsey 22	Arena: Palace of Sports; Attendance: 5,600; Referees: Grzegorz Ziemblicki, Panagiotis Anastopoulos, Rustu Nuran

21 November 2013 6	Partizan NIS Belgrade (Serbia)	64–82	(Spain) FC Barcelona	Belgrade
20:45	Scoring by quarter: 17–11, 15–27, 12–26, 20–18
	Pts: Bogdanović 24; Rebs: Lauvergne 12; Asts: three players 2 PIR: Bogdanović 17	Boxscore	Pts: Abrines 19; Rebs: Tomić 7 Asts: Papanikolaou 5 PIR: Pullen 17	Arena: Pionir Arena; Attendance: 8,000; Referees: Borys Ryzhyk, Oļegs Latiševs, Robert Vyklicky

29 November 2013 7	FC Barcelona (Spain)	94–81	(Turkey) Fenerbahçe Ülker Istanbul	Barcelona
21:00	Scoring by quarter: 35–15, 17–25, 22–22, 20–19
	Pts: Nachbar 23; Rebs: Nachbar 9 Asts: Tomić 5 PIR: Nachbar 31	Boxscore	Pts: McCalebb 22; Rebs: Bjelica 11; Asts: Bogdanović 5 PIR: Preldžić 25	Arena: Palau Blaugrana; Attendance: 5,494; Referees: Spiros Gkontas, Matej Boltauzer, Boris Shulga

6 December 2013 8	JSF Nanterre (France)	78–82	(Spain) FC Barcelona	Paris
20:15	Scoring by quarter: 19–17, 18–30, 20–19, 21–16
	Pts: Lighty 18; Rebs: Traoré 9 Asts: Meacham 5 PIR: Lighty 22	Boxscore	Pts: Navarro 15; Rebs: Dorsey 9 Asts: Abrines, Tomić 3 PIR: Lampe 16	Arena: Halle Georges Carpentier; Attendance: 4,500; Referees: Milivoje Jovcic, Robert Lottermoser, Carmelo Paternico

12 December 2013 9	CSKA Moscow (Russia)	79–65	(Spain) FC Barcelona	Moscow
17:45	Scoring by quarter: 20–21, 22–10, 11–21, 26–13
	Pts: Weems 15; Rebs: Vorontsevich 8 Asts: Weems 5 PIR: Weems 20	Boxscore	Pts: Oleson 14; Rebs: Tomić 10; Asts: Navarro 5 PIR: Tomić 18	Arena: USH CSKA; Attendance: 5,293; Referees: Sreten Radovic, Tolga Sahin, Damir Javor

19 December 2013 10	FC Barcelona (Spain)	96–77	(Ukraine) Budivelnyk Kyiv	Barcelona
21:00	Scoring by quarter: 25–15, 29–23, 19–24, 23–15
	Pts: Lampe 16; Rebs: Tomić 6 Asts: Pullen 8 PIR: Lampe 20	Boxscore	Pts: Summers 17; Rebs: Summers 8 Asts: Minard, Strēlnieks 4 PIR: Summers 27	Arena: Palau Blaugrana; Attendance: 3,134; Referees: Guerrino Cerebuch, Joseph Bissang, Ioannis Foufis

=== Top 16 ===
==== Group E ====
Pos	Team	Pld	W	L	PF	PA	PD
1	(Spain) FC Barcelona	14	12	2	1109	1009	+100
2	(Italy) EA7 Milano	14	10	4	1093	1011	+82
3	(Greece) Olympiacos	14	8	6	1058	996	+62
4	(Greece) Panathinaikos	14	7	7	961	958	+3
5	(Spain) Unicaja	14	6	8	1032	1063	−31
6	(Turkey) Fenerbahçe Ülker	14	6	8	1078	1101	−23
7	(Spain) Laboral Kutxa	14	5	9	1061	1125	−64
8	(Turkey) Anadolu Efes	14	2	12	967	1096	−129

==== Matches ====
2 January 2014 1	FC Barcelona (Spain)	84–65	(Turkey) Anadolu Efes	Barcelona
20:45	Scoring by quarter: 25–16, 27–13, 13–20, 19–16
	Pts: Navarro 21; Rebs: Dorsey 11; Asts: Sada 4 PIR: Dorsey, Navarro 21	Boxscore	Pts: Erden 15; Rebs: Balbay 5 Asts: Planinić 4 PIR: Erden 15	Arena: Palau Blaugrana; Attendance: 4,588; Referees: Ilija Belošević, Jakub Zamojski, Marko Juras

9 January 2014 2	Fenerbahçe Ülker Istanbul (Turkey)	73–76	(Spain) FC Barcelona	Istanbul
19:00	Scoring by quarter: 18–23, 21–16, 17–19, 17–18
	Pts: Bjelica, Mahmutoğlu 15; Rebs: Bjelica 7 Asts: Kleiza 3 PIR: McCalebb 19	Boxscore	Pts: Huertas 23; Rebs: Papanikolaou 7 Asts: Huertas 7 PIR: Huertas 30	Arena: Ülker Sports and Event Hall; Attendance: 12,986; Referees: Luigi Lamonica, Eddie Viator, Oļegs Latiševs

16 January 2014 3	Olympiacos Piraeus (Greece)	72–81	(Spain) FC Barcelona	Piraeus
20:00	Scoring by quarter: 23–18, 11–14, 14–23, 24–26
	Pts: Printezis, Spanoulis 17; Rebs: Lojeski 7 Asts: Spanoulis 5 PIR: Printezis 19	Boxscore	Pts: Navarro 21; Rebs: Dorsey 6 Asts: Papanikolaou, Sada 4 PIR: Navarro 22	Arena: Peace and Friendship Stadium; Attendance: 11,500; Referees: Borys Ryzhyk, Robert Lottermoser, Rustu Nuran

23 January 2014 4	FC Barcelona (Spain)	83–79	(Spain) Unicaja	Barcelona
20:45	Scoring by quarter: 25–24, 19–18, 22–26, 17–11
	Pts: Nachbar 13; Rebs: Lorbek 5 Asts: Huertas 6 PIR: Navarro 18	Boxscore	Pts: Suárez 15; Rebs: Caner-Medley 4 Asts: Granger 6 PIR: Suárez 19	Arena: Palau Blaugrana; Attendance: 4,521; Referees: Recep Ankarali, Grzegorz Ziemblicki, Panagiotis Anastopoulos

31 January 2014 5	Panathinaikos Athens (Greece)	56–63	(Spain) FC Barcelona	Marousi
20:30	Scoring by quarter: 23–24, 9–20, 15–8, 9–11
	Pts: Diamantidis, Lasme 13; Rebs: Lasme 8 Asts: Diamantidis 5 PIR: Diamantidis, Mačiulis 17	Boxscore	Pts: Huertas 17; Rebs: Dorsey, Nachbar 5 Asts: Navarro 3 PIR: Huertas 19	Arena: OAKA Basketball Arena; Attendance: 18,500; Referees: Grzegorz Ziemblicki, Joseph Bissang, Petros Papapetrou

14 February 2014 6	FC Barcelona (Spain)	80–70	(Italy) EA7 Emporio Armani Milan	Barcelona
20:45	Scoring by quarter: 12–15, 23–22, 14–15, 31–18
	Pts: Oleson 17; Rebs: Dorsey, Nachbar 6 Asts: Huertas 4 PIR: Oleson 18	Boxscore	Pts: Langford 18; Rebs: three players 6 Asts: Hackett 3 PIR: Langford 19	Arena: Palau Blaugrana; Attendance: 5,403; Referees: Christos Christodoulou, Sergey Zashchuk, Milija Vojinovic

20 February 2014 7	Laboral Kutxa (Spain)	68–80	(Spain) FC Barcelona	Vitoria-Gasteiz
20:30	Scoring by quarter: 17–27, 14–6, 18–26, 19–21
	Pts: San Emeterio 22; Rebs: Pleiß 10; Asts: Heurtel, Hodge 4 PIR: San Emeterio 26	Boxscore	Pts: Tomić 24; Rebs: Tomić 9 Asts: Navarro 5 PIR: Tomić 36	Arena: Buesa Arena; Attendance: 10,186; Referees: Ilija Belošević, Sreten Radovic, Elias Koromilas

27 February 2014 8	Anadolu Efes (Turkey)	84–89(OT)	(Spain) FC Barcelona	Istanbul
19:00	Scoring by quarter: 17–22, 9–16, 22–15, 27–22, Overtime: 9–14
	Pts: Planinić, Vasileiadis 14; Rebs: Gönlüm 7 Asts: Planinić 9 PIR: Planinić 20	Boxscore	Pts: Tomić 26; Rebs: Tomić 15; Asts: Navarro 11; PIR: Tomić 40	Arena: Abdi İpekçi Arena; Attendance: 7,136; Referees: Milivoje Jovcic, Borys Ryzhyk, Petar Obradovic

6 March 2014 9	FC Barcelona (Spain)	93–73	(Turkey) Fenerbahçe Ülker Istanbul	Barcelona
20:45	Scoring by quarter: 18–19, 27–19, 19–10, 29–25
	Pts: Tomić 19; Rebs: Dorsey 6 Asts: Navarro 5 PIR: Tomić 23	Boxscore	Pts: Bjelica 15; Rebs: Bjelica 10; Asts: Preldžić 4 PIR: Bjelica 23	Arena: Palau Blaugrana; Attendance: 5,858; Referees: Fernando Rocha, Spiros Gkontas, Matej Boltauzer

14 March 2014 10	FC Barcelona (Spain)	70–58	(Greece) Olympiacos Piraeus	Barcelona
21:00	Scoring by quarter: 18–13, 15–14, 22–17, 15–14
	Pts: Oleson 15; Rebs: Tomić 11; Asts: Huertas 5 PIR: Tomić 21	Boxscore	Pts: Dunston 18; Rebs: Mantzaris 8 Asts: Mantzaris 5 PIR: Dunston 22	Arena: Palau Blaugrana; Attendance: 6,938; Referees: Guerrino Cerebuch, Recep Ankarali, Nicola Maestre

21 March 2014 11	Unicaja (Spain)	61–77	(Spain) FC Barcelona	Málaga
20:45	Scoring by quarter: 17–21, 14–16, 16–18, 14–22
	Pts: Calloway 15; Rebs: four players 4 Asts: Calloway, Granger 3 PIR: Calloway, Kuzminskas 17	Boxscore	Pts: Nachbar 16; Rebs: Tomić 10; Asts: Navarro, Sada 5 PIR: Tomić 18	Arena: Martín Carpena; Attendance: 10,600; Referees: Christos Christodoulou, Jakub Zamojski, Eddie Viator

28 March 2014 12	FC Barcelona (Spain)	84–62	(Greece) Panathinaikos Athens	Barcelona
20:45	Scoring by quarter: 14–15, 28–17, 22–14, 20–16
	Pts: Abrines, Lorbek 15; Rebs: Tomić 9 Asts: Sada 5 PIR: Tomić 22	Boxscore	Pts: Ukić 13; Rebs: Mačiulis 6 Asts: Diamantidis 4 PIR: Diamantidis 12	Arena: Palau Blaugrana; Attendance: 5,803; Referees: Borys Ryzhyk, Grzegorz Ziemblicki, Marek Cmikiewicz

2 April 2014 13	EA7 Emporio Armani Milan (Italy)	91–63	(Spain) FC Barcelona	Assago
20:00	Scoring by quarter: 21–20, 22–14, 26–6, 22–23
	Pts: Gentile 24; Rebs: Gentile 7 Asts: Gentile 6 PIR: Gentile 28	Boxscore	Pts: Abrines 14; Rebs: Dorsey 11; Asts: Huertas, Tomić 3 PIR: Abrines, Tomić 14	Arena: Mediolanum Forum; Attendance: 12,331; Referees: Sreten Radovic, Matej Boltauzer, Oļegs Latiševs

10 April 2014 14	FC Barcelona (Spain)	86–97	(Spain) Laboral Kutxa	Barcelona
20:45	Scoring by quarter: 28–22, 22–13, 10–31, 26–31
	Pts: Navarro 25; Rebs: Dorsey 6 Asts: Huertas, Navarro 5 PIR: Navarro 28	Boxscore	Pts: Nocioni 37; Rebs: Pleiß 6 Asts: Heurtel 7 PIR: Nocioni 35	Arena: Palau Blaugrana; Attendance: 4,050; Referees: Tolga Sahin, Murat Biricik, Damir Javor

=== Quarterfinals ===
15 April 2014 1	FC Barcelona (Spain)	88–61	(Turkey) Galatasaray Liv Hospital	Barcelona
19:00	Scoring by quarter: 14–21, 19–14, 26–14, 29–12
	Pts: Nachbar 19; Rebs: Dorsey 11; Asts: Tomić 6 PIR: Nachbar 19	Boxscore	Pts: Arroyo 14; Rebs: Aldemir 7 Asts: Arroyo, Güler 2 PIR: Arroyo 16	Arena: Palau Blaugrana; Attendance: 5,227; Referees: Christos Christodoulou, Jakub Zamojski, Elias Koromilas

17 April 2014 2	FC Barcelona (Spain)	84–63	(Turkey) Galatasaray Liv Hospital	Barcelona
21:00	Scoring by quarter: 21–8, 22–17, 18–16, 23–22
	Pts: Oleson 14; Rebs: Tomić 8 Asts: Huertas 6 PIR: Oleson 21	Boxscore	Pts: Domercant 11; Rebs: Aldemir 7 Asts: Arlsan 7 PIR: Arslan 19	Arena: Palau Blaugrana; Attendance: 5,573; Referees: Robert Lottermoser, Milivoje Jovcic, Marcin Kowalski

20 April 2014 3	Galatasaray Liv Hospital (Turkey)	75–78	(Spain) FC Barcelona	Istanbul
19:00	Scoring by quarter: 23–15, 17–20, 12–18, 23–25
	Pts: Arroyo 21; Rebs: Hairston 7 Asts: Arroyo 4 PIR: Erceg 23	Boxscore	Pts: Huertas 16; Rebs: Tomić 6 Asts: Papanikolaou 3 PIR: Oleson 16	Arena: Abdi İpekçi Arena; Attendance: 11,470; Referees: Guerrino Cerebuch, Borys Ryzhyk, Panagiotis Anastopoulos

=== Final Four ===
==== Semifinals ====
16 May 2014	FC Barcelona (Spain)	62–100	(Spain) Real Madrid	Assago
21:00	Scoring by quarter: 20–20, 17–25, 11–28, 14–27
	Pts: Tomić 16; Rebs: Tomić 8 Asts: Huertas 6 PIR: Tomić 21	Boxscore	Pts: Rodríguez 21; Rebs: Llull, Slaughter 5 Asts: Rodríguez 6 PIR: Mirotić 27	Arena: Mediolanum Forum; Attendance: 11,843; Referees: Christos Christodoulou, Ilija Belošević, Robert Lottermoser

==== Third place game ====
18 May 2014	FC Barcelona (Spain)	93–78	(Russia) CSKA Moscow	Assago
17:00	Scoring by quarter: 21–24, 29–23, 19–17, 24–14
	Pts: Navarro 17; Rebs: Dorsey 12; Asts: Huertas 7 PIR: Navarro 24	Boxscore	Pts: Kaun 13; Rebs: Khryapa 4 Asts: Khryapa 7 PIR: Kaun 18	Arena: Mediolanum Forum; Attendance: 11,843; Referees: Robert Lottermoser, Fernando Rocha, Rustu Nuran

=== Copa del Rey ===
==== Quarterfinals ====
7 February 2014	FC Barcelona	102–60	Iberostar Tenerife	Málaga
21:30	Scoring by quarter: 22–16, 32–18, 21–14, 27–12
	Pts: Huertas 13; Rebs: Tomić 8 Asts: Huertas, Oleson 5 PIR: Huertas 19	Boxscore	Pts: Úriz 12; Rebs: Sikma 8 Asts: Richotti 6 PIR: Gutiérrez 14	Arena: Martín Carpena; Attendance: 9,300; Referees: Daniel Hierrezuelo, Vicente Bultó, Carlos Peruga

==== Semifinals ====
8 February 2014	FC Barcelona	89–81	Valencia Basket	Málaga
21:30	Scoring by quarter: 31–9, 17–24, 16–15, 25–33
	Pts: Navarro 20; Rebs: three players 6 Asts: Huertas 8 PIR: Navarro 27	Boxscore	Pts: Sato 21; Rebs: Sato 11; Asts: Lafayette, Ribas 3 PIR: Sato 29	Arena: Martín Carpena; Attendance: 10,600; Referees: Emilio Pérez Pizarro, Antonio Conde, Vicente Bultó

==== Final ====
9 February 2014	FC Barcelona	76–77	Real Madrid	Málaga
18:00	Scoring by quarter: 17–16, 25–22, 17–22, 17–17
	Pts: Huertas 15; Rebs: Tomić 9 Asts: Huertas 8 PIR: Huertas 17	Boxscore	Pts: Fernández 19; Rebs: Mirotić 11; Asts: Llull 6 PIR: Mirotić 32	Arena: Martín Carpena; Attendance: 11,000; Referees: Daniel Hierrezuelo, Juan Carlos García González, Antonio Conde

=== Supercopa de España ===
==== Semifinals ====
4 October 2013	Laboral Kutxa	73–98	FC Barcelona	Vitoria-Gasteiz
21:30	Scoring by quarter: 25–27, 13–27, 13–22, 22–22
	Pts: Nocioni 13; Rebs: Pleiß 10; Asts: Heurtel, Hodge 3 PIR: Pleiß 14	Boxscore	Pts: Nachbar 22; Rebs: three players 4 Asts: Sada 6 PIR: Nachbar 25	Arena: Fernando Buesa Arena; Attendance: 9,584; Referees: Antonio Conde, Benjamín Jiménez, Fernando Calatrava

==== Final ====
5 October 2013	FC Barcelona	79–83	Real Madrid	Vitoria-Gasteiz
19:00	Scoring by quarter: 21–29, 23–17, 12–17, 23–20
	Pts: Tomić 21; Rebs: Dorsey, Tomić 8 Asts: Huertas 10; PIR: Huertas 24	Boxscore	Pts: Mirotić 20; Rebs: Fernández 7 Asts: Fernández, Llull 2 PIR: Mirotić 22	Arena: Fernando Buesa Arena; Attendance: 8,217; Referees: Antonio Conde, Benjamín Jiménez, Carlos Cortés

== Individual awards ==
=== Lliga Catalana ===
Finals MVP

- (Spain) Álex Abrines

=== Liga ACB ===
Player of the Round

- (Georgia (country)) Jacob Pullen – Round 22
- (Poland) Maciej Lampe – Round 25

Player of the Month

- (Poland) Maciej Lampe – March

All-ACB Best Young Players Team

- (Spain) Álex Abrines

=== EuroLeague ===
All-EuroLeague First Team

- (Croatia) Ante Tomić

MVP of the Round

- (Slovenia) Boštjan Nachbar – Round 7 (Regular season)
- (Brazil) Marcelinho Huertas – Round 2 (Top 16)
- (Croatia) Ante Tomić – Round 7, Round 8 (Top 16)

MVP of the Month

- (Croatia) Ante Tomić – February, March
