= 2014 ACB Playoffs =

The 2014 ACB Playoffs were the final phase of the 2013–14 ACB season. They started on May 29 and ended on June 19. Real Madrid were the defending champions.

All times are CEST (UTC+02:00), except the game played in the Canary Islands (WEST, UTC+01:00).

== Bracket ==
Quarter Finals
1	Real Madrid	2
8	CAI Zaragoza	0
4	Unicaja	2
5	Herbalife Gran Canaria	1
2	Valencia BC	2
7	Cajasol	1
3	FC Barcelona	2
6	Laboral Kutxa	0

Semifinals
1	Real Madrid	3
4	Unicaja	1
2	Valencia BC	2
3	FC Barcelona	3

Finals
1	Real Madrid	1
3	FC Barcelona	3

== Quarterfinals ==
The quarterfinals are best-of-3 series.

=== Real Madrid vs. CAI Zaragoza ===
May 30
21:00

Boxscore

Real Madrid	78–70	CAI Zaragoza
Scoring by quarter: 19–18, 20–15, 16–15, 23–22
Pts: Reyes 18; Rebs: Bourousis, Mirotić 7 Asts: Llull, Rodríguez 5 PIR: Reyes 22		Pts: Jones, Roll 13; Rebs: Sanikidze 13; Asts: Llompart 5 PIR: Sanikidze 27

Palacio de Deportes, Madrid
Attendance: 8,428
Referees: Jiménez, Perea, Oyón

June 1
12:40

Boxscore

CAI Zaragoza	95–101	Real Madrid
Scoring by quarter: 29–26, 22–29, 24–29, 20–17
Pts: Rudež 20; Rebs: Sanikidze 6 Asts: Llompart 6 PIR: Sanikidze 22		Pts: Mirotić 15; Rebs: Mirotić 6 Asts: three players 4 PIR: Mirotić 24
Real Madrid wins 2–0

Pabellón Príncipe Felipe, Zaragoza
Attendance: 9,032
Referees: Hierrezuelo, Araña, Manuel

=== Unicaja vs. Herbalife Gran Canaria ===
May 29
20:30

Boxscore

Unicaja	78–70	Herbalife Gran Canaria
Scoring by quarter: 12–22, 24–14, 15–15, 27–19
Pts: Vázquez 16; Rebs: Vázquez 10; Asts: Granger 10; PIR: Granger 22		Pts: Bellas 18; Rebs: Tavares 9 Asts: Bellas 7 PIR: Bellas 18

José María Martín Carpena, Málaga
Attendance: 6,558
Referees: Pérez Pizarro, Peruga, Guirao

June 1
19:00

Boxscore

Herbalife Gran Canaria	63–62	Unicaja
Scoring by quarter: 12–13, 17–23, 15–12, 19–14
Pts: Oliver 18; Rebs: Tavares 13; Asts: Bellas 6 PIR: Tavares 19		Pts: Granger 17; Rebs: Štimac 8 Asts: Granger 6 PIR: Granger 23

Gran Canaria Arena, Las Palmas
Attendance: 5,855
Referees: García González, Cortés, Sánchez Montserrat

June 3
21:00

Boxscore

Unicaja	79–60	Herbalife Gran Canaria
Scoring by quarter: 15–15, 23–18, 20–15, 21–12
Pts: T. Urtasun 15; Rebs: Caner-Medley 7 Asts: Granger 5 PIR: Caner-Medley 18		Pts: Bellas 15; Rebs: Báez 5 Asts: Hansbrough 4 PIR: Martín 12
Unicaja wins 2–1

José María Martín Carpena, Málaga
Attendance: 7,524
Referees: Martín Bertrán, García González, Calatrava

=== Valencia Basket vs. Cajasol ===
May 29
21:00

Boxscore

Valencia Basket	84–54	Cajasol
Scoring by quarter: 19–17, 18–12, 23–15, 24–9
Pts: Lafayette 15; Rebs: Dubljević 7 Asts: Van Rossom 6 PIR: Van Rossom 22		Pts: Bamforth 12; Rebs: Bamforth, Landry 6 Asts: Satoranský 5 PIR: A. Urtasun 13

Pabellón Fuente de San Luis, Valencia
Attendance: 8,000
Referees: Pérez Pérez, Redondo, Pérez Niz

May 31
20:00

Boxscore

Cajasol	84–78	Valencia Basket
Scoring by quarter: 18–20, 16–14, 32–18, 18–26
Pts: Landry 26; Rebs: Hernangómez, Satoranský 6 Asts: Satoranský 5 PIR: Landry 27		Pts: Van Rossom 20; Rebs: Lučić 8 Asts: Lafayette 7 PIR: Van Rossom 19

Palacio de Deportes San Pablo, Seville
Attendance: 5,800
Referees: Martín Bertrán, Arteaga, Sánchez Mohedas

June 2
20:30

Boxscore

Valencia Basket	87–84	Cajasol
Scoring by quarter: 20–19, 26–22, 20–22, 21–21
Pts: Lafayette 22; Rebs: Doellman 11; Asts: Lafayette, Martínez 4 PIR: Lafayette 24		Pts: Bamforth, Satoranský 17; Rebs: Mata, Porziņģis 7 Asts: Satoranský 11; PIR: Satoranský 25
Valencia BC wins 2–1

Pabellón Fuente de San Luis, Valencia
Attendance: 8,300
Referees: Arteaga, Pérez Pizarro, Perea

=== FC Barcelona vs. Laboral Kutxa ===
May 29
21:00

Boxscore

FC Barcelona	92–87	Laboral Kutxa
Scoring by quarter: 23–20, 13–23, 33–25, 23–19
Pts: Oleson 29; Rebs: Dorsey 11; Asts: Navarro 5 PIR: Navarro, Oleson 31		Pts: Heurtel 23; Rebs: Hamilton 6 Asts: Heurtel 7 PIR: Heurtel 29

Palau Blaugrana, Barcelona
Attendance: 4,101
Referees: Arteaga, Araña, Castillo

May 31
21:15

Boxscore

Laboral Kutxa	71–95	FC Barcelona
Scoring by quarter: 19–21, 18–28, 12–20, 22–26
Pts: Nocioni 14; Rebs: Nocioni 8 Asts: Heurtel 3 PIR: Causeur 17		Pts: Lampe 14; Rebs: Dorsey 8 Asts: Abrines 5 PIR: Lampe 18
FC Barcelona wins 2–0

Fernando Buesa Arena, Vitoria-Gasteiz
Attendance: 10,472
Referees: Conde, Bultó, Martínez Díez

== Semifinals ==
=== Real Madrid vs. Unicaja ===
June 6
20:00

Boxscore

Real Madrid	98–93 (OT)	Unicaja
Scoring by quarter: 20–21, 21–31, 26–16, 16–15, Overtime: 15–10
Pts: Llull 18; Rebs: Mirotić 9 Asts: R. Fernández 5 PIR: Mirotić 28		Pts: Vázquez 17; Rebs: Suárez 8 Asts: Toolson 6 PIR: Vázquez 20

Palacio de Deportes, Madrid
Attendance: 8,163
Referees: Arteaga, Jiménez, Redondo

June 8
12:15

Boxscore

Real Madrid	89–87	Unicaja
Scoring by quarter: 22–26, 22–22, 26–18, 19–21
Pts: R. Fernández 18; Rebs: Reyes 5 Asts: Llull, Rodríguez 6 PIR: Llull 23		Pts: Granger, Vázquez 18; Rebs: Caner-Medley 10; Asts: Granger, Toolson 4 PIR: Suárez 25

Palacio de Deportes, Madrid
Attendance: 8,309
Referees: Martín Bertrán, Pérez Pizarro, Peruga

June 10
22:00

Boxscore

Unicaja	88–75	Real Madrid
Scoring by quarter: 24–25, 26–20, 25–10, 13–20
Pts: Caner-Medley, Vázquez 14; Rebs: Caner-Medley 7 Asts: Granger 6 PIR: Caner-Medley 25		Pts: Darden, Mirotić 11; Rebs: Llull, Rodríguez 4 Asts: Llull 6 PIR: Llull 17

José María Martín Carpena, Málaga
Attendance: 10,138
Referees: Arteaga, Bultó, Perea

June 12
20:15

Unicaja	79–89 (OT)	Real Madrid
Scoring by quarter: 17–24, 18–13, 20–19, 18–17, Overtime: 6–16
Pts: Toolson 17; Rebs: Suárez, Vázquez 8 Asts: Granger 8 PIR: Suárez 19		Pts: Llull, Reyes 22; Rebs: three players 9 Asts: Llull 8 PIR: Reyes 26
Real Madrid wins 3–1

José María Martín Carpena, Málaga
Attendance: 10,600
Referees: García González, Pérez Pérez, Calatrava

=== Valencia Basket vs. FC Barcelona ===
June 5
21:00

Boxscore

Valencia Basket	58–77	FC Barcelona
Scoring by quarter: 14–16, 19–19, 9–16, 16–26
Pts: Ribas 12; Rebs: Sato 7 Asts: Ribas 5 PIR: Ribas 18		Pts: Nachbar, Tomić 15; Rebs: Huertas 8 Asts: Sada, Navarro 4 PIR: Tomić 20

Pabellón Fuente de San Luis, Valencia
Attendance: 7,900
Referees: Hierrezuelo, Pérez Pérez, Cortés

June 7
21:00

Boxscore

Valencia Basket	59–60	FC Barcelona
Scoring by quarter: 22–12, 9–16, 12–18, 16–14
Pts: Doellman 16; Rebs: Doellman 9 Asts: Van Rossom 6 PIR: Doellman 26		Pts: Huertas 11; Rebs: Tomić 10; Asts: Huertas 5 PIR: Navarro 15

Pabellón Fuente de San Luis, Valencia
Attendance: 8,200
Referees: García González, Conde, García Ortiz

June 10
20:15

Boxscore

FC Barcelona	70–74	Valencia Basket
Scoring by quarter: 25–20, 17–12, 17–21, 11–21
Pts: Dorsey 20; Rebs: Lampe 6 Asts: Huertas 4 PIR: Dorsey 23		Pts: Doellman 19; Rebs: Lishchuk 12; Asts: Doellman 8 PIR: Doellman 31

Palau Blaugrana, Barcelona
Attendance: 6,048
Referees: Hierrezuelo, Jiménez, Araña

June 12
22:00

Boxscore

FC Barcelona	63–81	Valencia Basket
Scoring by quarter: 16–20, 9–17, 16–24, 22–20
Pts: Navarro 18; Rebs: Tomić 9 Asts: Navarro, Oleson 2 PIR: Navarro 20		Pts: Van Rossom 17; Rebs: Lishchuk 8 Asts: Lafayette 4 PIR: Sato 19

Palau Blaugrana, Barcelona
Attendance: 5,079
Referees: Conde, García Ortiz, Cortés

June 15
19:00

Report

Valencia Basket	75–77	FC Barcelona
Scoring by quarter: 20–18, 23–16, 14–27, 18–16
Pts: Doellman 18; Rebs: Sato 8 Asts: Van Rossom 5 PIR: Lishchuk 23		Pts: Huertas 22; Rebs: Tomić 8 Asts: Huertas 9 PIR: Huertas 31
FC Barcelona wins 3–2

Pabellón Fuente de San Luis, Valencia
Attendance: 8,500
Referees: Hierrezuelo, Pérez Pizarro, Conde

== Final ==
=== Real Madrid vs. FC Barcelona ===
June 19
21:30

Boxscore

Real Madrid	93–98	FC Barcelona
Scoring by quarter: 16–23, 28–25, 29–22, 20–27
Pts: R. Fernández, Rodríguez 16; Rebs: R. Fernández 6 Asts: R. Fernández 8 PIR: R. Fernández 27		Pts: Nachbar, Tomić 17; Rebs: Tomić 11; Asts: Huertas 5 PIR: Tomić 22

Palacio de Deportes, Madrid
Attendance: 11,342
Referees: Conde, Pérez Pérez, Jiménez

June 21
22:00

Boxscore

Real Madrid	87–78	FC Barcelona
Scoring by quarter: 24–14, 16–16, 18–21, 29–27
Pts: R. Fernández 17; Rebs: Mejri 7 Asts: Rodríguez 8 PIR: Bourousis 23		Pts: Oleson 17; Rebs: Oleson, Tomić 6 Asts: Huertas 7 PIR: Oleson 20

Palacio de Deportes, Madrid
Attendance: 11,871
Referees: Hierrezuelo, García González, Peruga

June 24
19:15

Boxscore

FC Barcelona	94–79	Real Madrid
Scoring by quarter: 31–20, 21–20, 28–23, 14–16
Pts: Navarro 19; Rebs: Dorsey 10; Asts: Huertas 8 PIR: Oleson 18		Pts: Llull 15; Rebs: Carroll 8 Asts: Llull, Rodríguez 3 PIR: Bourousis, Llull 14

Palau Blaugrana, Barcelona
Attendance: 7,328
Referees: Arteaga, Pérez Pizarro, Bultó

June 26
19:00

FC Barcelona	83–81	Real Madrid
Scoring by quarter: 25–19, 22–23, 18–15, 18–24
Pts: Tomić 22; Rebs: Tomić 9 Asts: Huertas 7 PIR: Tomić 28		Pts: R. Fernández 13; Rebs: Bourousis 7 Asts: Llull, Rodríguez 3 PIR: Bourousis 17
FC Barcelona wins series 3–1

Palau Blaugrana, Barcelona
Attendance: 7,573
Referees: Hierrezuelo, Pérez Pérez, García Ortiz
