= Marcus Slaughter =

American basketball player (born 1985)

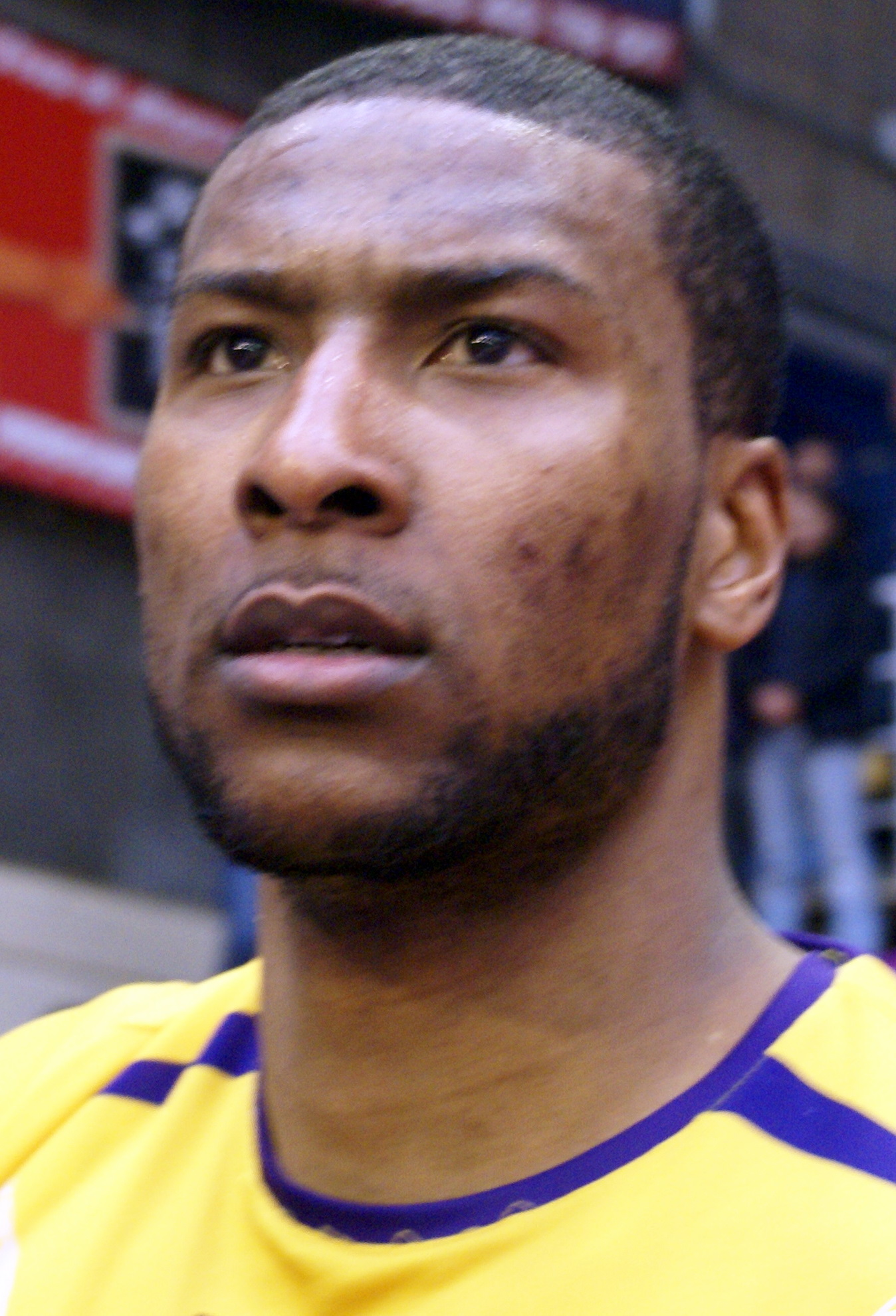
- Slaughter in 2011

Personal information
- Born: March 18, 1985 (age 41) San Leandro, California, U.S.
- Listed height: 6 ft 8 in (2.03 m)
- Listed weight: 230 lb (104 kg)

Career information
- High school: J. W. North (Riverside, California)
- College: San Diego State (2003–2006)
- NBA draft: 2006: undrafted
- Playing career: 2006–2021
- Position: Center
- Number: 42, 44

Career history
- 2006–2007: Pınar Karşıyaka
- 2007–2008: Hapoel Jerusalem
- 2008: BCM Gravelines
- 2008: Eisbären Bremerhaven
- 2008–2009: STB Le Havre
- 2009–2010: SLUC Nancy
- 2010–2011: CB Valladolid
- 2011–2012: Brose Baskets
- 2012–2015: Real Madrid
- 2015–2017: Darüşşafaka Doğuş
- 2017–2018: Virtus Bologna
- 2018–2019: Bahçeşehir
- 2019–2021: AEK Athens

Career highlights
- EuroLeague champion (2015); All-FIBA Champions League Defensive Team (2020); 2× Spanish League champion (2013, 2015); 2× Spanish Cup winner (2014, 2015); 3× Spanish Supercup winner (2012–2014); German Bundesliga champion (2012); German Cup winner (2012); Greek Cup winner (2020); Spanish League Most Spectacular Player (2011); Greek League All Star (2020); BSL All-Star Game MVP (2007)

Marcus Anthony Slaughter (born March 18, 1985) is an American former professional basketball player. Standing at 6 ft 8 in (2.03 m), he primarily played at the center position. He completed his collegiate career playing for the San Diego State Aztecs.

== Professional career ==
After going undrafted in the 2006 NBA draft, he signed a contract with the Turkish team Pınar Karşıyaka. He had a productive season with Karşıyaka, averaging 13.3 points, 10.1 rebounds, 1.2 blocks and 2.3 steals per game. He was also named MVP of the 2007 Turkish All-Star game. Then he was signed a two-year contract with the Miami Heat in June 2007, but was released October 29, 2007.

For the 2007–08 season he has signed with the Israeli team Hapoel Jerusalem. After being released by Hapoel Jerusalem, he signed with BCM Gravelines Dunkerque of the French Pro A League.

In the 2008–09 season, he signed a one-year contract with the German club Eisbären Bremerhaven. In August 2009, he signed a one-year contract with SLUC Nancy of the French Pro A League.

On July 27, 2010, he signed a one-year contract with CB Valladolid. At the end of the 2010–11 ACB season, Slaughter was prized with the ACB Most Spectacular Player award.

In July 2011, he signed a one-year contract with the German club Brose Baskets. One year later, and after winning the 2011–12 German League and the German Cup title, Slaughter came back to Spain and signed with EuroLeague and Spanish powerhouse Real Madrid. In August 2013, he extended his contract with Real Madrid until the end of 2013–14 season.

In 2014–15 season, Real Madrid won the EuroLeague, after defeating Olympiacos, by a score of 78–59, in the EuroLeague Finals. Real Madrid eventually finished the season by also winning the Spanish League championship, after a series 3–0 win in the league's final series against FC Barcelona. In all, they managed to win the triple crown during the season. In September 2015, he parted ways with Real Madrid.

On September 6, 2015, he signed a two-year deal with the Turkish team Darüşşafaka Doğuş.

On August 14, 2017, Slaughter signed with the Italian team Virtus Bologna for the 2017–18 season.

On August 9, 2019, he signed with AEK Athens of the Greek Basket League. Slaughter averaged 4.8 rebounds, 4.6 points and 1.1 assists per game. He re-signed with the team on July 28, 2020.

== Career statistics ==
Legend
| GP | Games played | GS | Games started | MPG | Minutes per game |
| FG% | Field-goal percentage | 3P% | 3-point field-goal percentage | FT% | Free-throw percentage |
| RPG | Rebounds per game | APG | Assists per game | SPG | Steals per game |
| BPG | Blocks per game | PPG | Points per game | PIR | Performance index rating |
| **Bold** | Career high |

=== EuroLeague ===
| † | Denotes season in which Slaughter won the EuroLeague |
| * | Led the league |

| Year | Team | GP | GS | MPG | FG% | 3P% | FT% | RPG | APG | SPG | BPG | PPG | PIR |
|---|---|---|---|---|---|---|---|---|---|---|---|---|---|
| 2011–12 | Bamberg | 10 | **10** | **25.9** | .564 | — | .714 | **7.2** | **1.5** | **1.7** | **1.4** | **11.8** | **17.7** |
| 2012–13 | Real Madrid | 29 | 2 | 19.3 | .660 | — | .386 | 3.6 | .4 | .9 | .7 | 5.0 | 6.8 |
| 2013–14 | Real Madrid | **31*** | 0 | 12.3 | **.689** | .000 | .471 | 2.4 | .5 | .6 | .3 | 3.2 | 4.0 |
| 2014–15† | Real Madrid | 27 | 0 | 12.2 | .640 | — | .485 | 2.1 | .6 | 1.0 | .2 | 3.0 | 4.2 |
| 2015–16 | Darüşşafaka | 24 | 0 | 16.0 | .632 | — | **.740** | 3.8 | .8 | .6 | .9 | 4.5 | 7.9 |
| 2016–17 | Darüşşafaka | 13 | 3 | 15.1 | .577 | — | .571 | 2.6 | .5 | .5 | .4 | 3.2 | 3.5 |
| Career | | 134 | 15 | 15.7 | .631 | .000 | .571 | 3.2 | .6 | .8 | .6 | 4.4 | 6.3 |

=== Domestic leagues ===
| Season | Team | League | GP | MPG | FG% | 3P% | FT% | RPG | APG | SPG | BPG | PPG |
|---|---|---|---|---|---|---|---|---|---|---|---|---|
| 2006–07 | Pınar Karşıyaka | BSL | 29 | 31.9 | .516 | .125 | .672 | 10.2 | 1.3 | ? | ? | 13.3 |
| 2007–08 | Hapoel Jerusalem | ISBL | 5 | 17.6 | .720 | .200 | .690 | 6.4 | 1.0 | 1.6 | 1.0 | 8.0 |
| 2007–08 | BCM Gravelines | Pro A | 15 | 20.8 | .630 | -- | .590 | 5.0 | 1.4 | 1.3 | .9 | 9.3 |
| 2008–09 | Eisbären Bremerhaven | German BBL | 8 | 33.6 | .598 | .600 | .685 | 10.0 | 1.3 | 2.6 | 1.3 | 18.8 |
| 2008–09 | STB Le Havre | Pro A | 21 | 29.9 | .588 | .400 | .650 | 9.5 | 1.6 | 1.6 | .7 | 16.0 |
| 2009–10 | SLUC Nancy | Pro A | 29 | 23.6 | .645 | .333 | .691 | 7.0 | 1.4 | 1.5 | 1.4 | 12.5 |
| 2010–11 | Blancos de Rueda Valladolid | ACB | 34 | 22.0 | .650 | .000 | .675 | 6.0 | .6 | 1.4 | 1.0 | 9.9 |
| 2011–12 | Brose Baskets Bamberg | German BBL | 44 | 20.1 | .650 | .333 | .621 | 4.9 | .9 | .8 | 1.0 | 8.4 |
| 2012–13 | Real Madrid | ACB | 44 | 15.7 | .632 | .000 | .567 | 2.9 | .4 | .9 | .5 | 4.0 |
| 2013–14 | Real Madrid | ACB | 43 | 12.2 | .635 | .000 | .523 | 3.1 | .6 | .6 | .4 | 3.0 |
| 2014–15 | Real Madrid | ACB | 22 | 13.9 | .690 | -- | .421 | 3.1 | .6 | .7 | .5 | 3.0 |

== Awards and accomplishments ==
=== Pro career ===
- 2012 Spanish Supercup: Winner
- 2013 Spanish League: Champion
- 2013 Spanish Supercup: Winner
- 2014 Spanish King's Cup: Winner
- 2014 Spanish Supercup: Winner
- 2015 Spanish King's Cup: Winner
- 2015 EuroLeague: Champion
- 2015 Spanish League: Champion
