= Tremmell Darden =

American basketball player (born 1981)

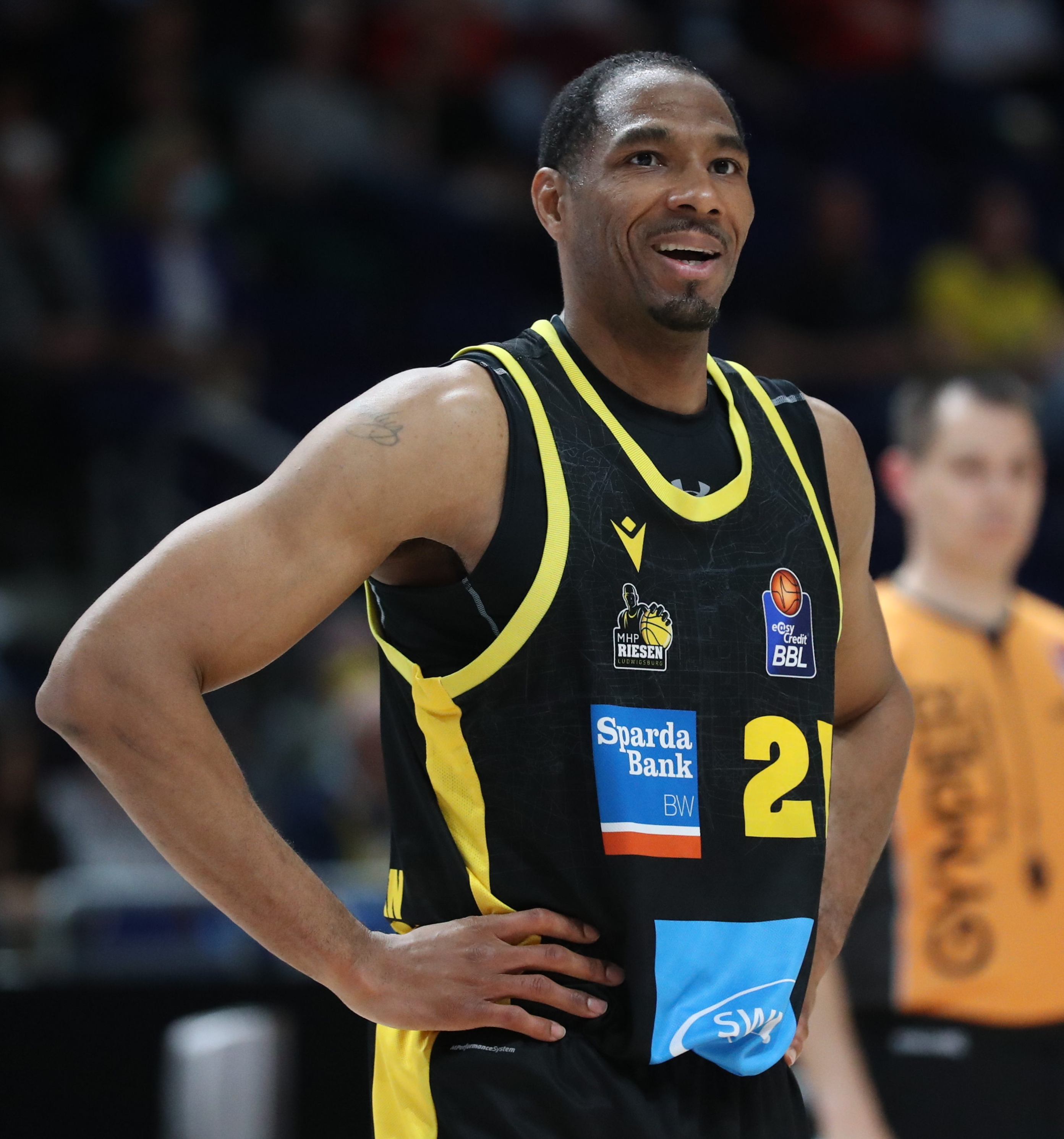
- Darden with Riesen Ludwigsburg in 2022

Personal information
- Born: November 17, 1981 (age 44) Inglewood, California
- Listed height: 6 ft 5 in (1.96 m)
- Listed weight: 220 lb (100 kg)

Career information
- High school: Las Vegas (Las Vegas, Nevada)
- College: Niagara (2000–2004)
- NBA draft: 2004: undrafted
- Playing career: 2004–2024
- Position: Small forward / power forward

Career history
- 2004–2005: Erdemirspor Kdz. Ereğli
- 2005–2006: Leuven
- 2006–2008: Spirou Charleroi
- 2008–2009: South Dragons
- 2009–2010: SIG Strasbourg
- 2010–2011: SLUC Nancy
- 2011–2012: Unicaja Málaga
- 2012–2013: Žalgiris Kaunas
- 2013–2014: Real Madrid
- 2014–2015: Olympiacos
- 2015–2016: Beşiktaş
- 2016–2017: Cantù
- 2018: Antwerp Giants
- 2018–2020: Mitteldeutscher BC
- 2020–2022: Riesen Ludwigsburg
- 2022–2023: Mitteldeutscher BC
- 2024: Crailsheim Merlins

Career highlights
- Liga ACB champion (2013); Greek League champion (2015); French League champion (2011); Belgian League champion (2008); Australian League champion (2009); Spanish Cup winner (2014); Lithuanian Supercup winner (2012); Spanish Supercup winner (2013); French League Foreign Players All-Star (2010); 2× Second-team All-MAAC (2003, 2004)

Tremmell Lequincy Dushun Darden (born December 17, 1981) is an American professional basketball player. Standing at 6 ft 5 in (1.96 m), he plays at the small forward and power forward positions.

== High school career ==
Darden played high school basketball at Las Vegas High School, in Las Vegas, Nevada.

== College career ==
Darden played college basketball at Niagara University, where he played with the Niagara Purple Eagles, from 2000 to 2004. He was named to the All-Metro Atlantic Athletic Conference 2nd Team, in both 2003 and 2004.

== Professional career ==
Darden began his professional career in Turkey, in the 2004–05 season, with Erdemirspor. He then moved to the Belgian club Leuven Bears, where he spent the 2005–06 season. From 2006 to 2008, Darden played with Spirou Charleroi of Belgium. With Charleroi, he won the Belgian League championship, in the 2007–08 season.

In 2008, Darden signed with the South Dragons of Australia's NBL league. With the Dragons, he won the 2008–09 NBL season.

In August 2009, Darden signed a one-year deal with Strasbourg IG of France's LNB Pro A. In 2010, he was named a French League Foreign Players All-Star. In July 2010, he signed a one-year deal with another French team, SLUC Nancy Basket. Over the two-year period that he spent with the French teams, Darden was twice named the French League Player of the Month: (Dec. 2010, Feb. 2011).

In August 2011, he signed a one-year deal with the Spanish club Unicaja Málaga of the Liga ACB.

On July 20, 2012, Darden signed a one-year deal with Žalgiris Kaunas of Lithuania's LKL league. On March 11, 2013, he left Žalgiris. Two days later, he signed with the Spanish EuroLeague club, Real Madrid, for the rest of the season. In July 2013, he extended his contract with Real Madrid for one more season.

In July 2014, Darden signed a two-year deal with Olympiacos of Greece's Greek Basket League. On June 24, 2015, he parted ways with Olympiacos.

On September 12, 2015, he signed a one-year contract with the Turkish team Beşiktaş of the BSL league.

On September 14, 2016, Darden signed with Italian club Pallacanestro Cantù of the LBA league for the 2016–17 LBA season.

Darden played for Mitteldeutscher BC of the Basketball Bundesliga during the 2019–20 season. He parted ways with the team on July 21, 2020.

On October 15, 2020, Darden signed with Riesen Ludwigsburg of the Basketball Bundesliga. Darden averaged 7.3 points and 2.9 rebounds per game. He re-signed with the team on September 8, 2021.

On August 21, 2022, he signed with Mitteldeutscher BC of the German Basketball Bundesliga.

On January 2, 2024, at the age of 42, Darden once more returned to the German Basketball Bundesliga, signing a contract with Crailsheim Merlins for the remainder of the 2023-24 BBL season.

== Career statistics ==
Legend
GP	Games played	GS	Games started	MPG	Minutes per game
FG%	Field-goal percentage	3P%	3-point field-goal percentage	FT%	Free-throw percentage
RPG	Rebounds per game	APG	Assists per game	SPG	Steals per game
BPG	Blocks per game	PPG	Points per game	PIR	Performance index rating
**Bold**	Career high

=== EuroLeague ===
*	Led the league

Year	Team	GP	GS	MPG	FG%	3P%	FT%	RPG	APG	SPG	BPG	PPG	PIR
2011–12	Málaga	10	10	26.4	.429	.333	**.783**	3.5	**.8**	.3	**.9**	8.3	7.2
2012–13	Žalgiris	20	19	**24.2**	**.633**	**.517**	.724	**3.9**	**.8**	**.5**	.2	**9.9**	**11.1**
2013–14	Real Madrid	**31***	**30**	20.0	.459	.464	.720	2.6	**.8**	.3	**.5**	5.7	6.2
2014–15	Olympiacos	27	26	15.7	.387	.265	**.783**	1.8	.5	**.5**	.4	4.2	3.5
Career		88	85	20.4	.486	.410	.750	2.7	.7	.4	.5	6.5	6.6
