= Nikola Mirotić =

Montenegrin-Spanish basketball player (born 1991)

- Mirotić with Olimpia Milano in 2023

No. 33 – Valencia Basket
- Position: Power forward
- League: Liga ACB; EuroLeague

Personal information
- Born: 11 February 1991 (age 35) Titograd, SR Montenegro, Yugoslavia
- Listed height: 2.08 m (6 ft 10 in)
- Listed weight: 108 kg (238 lb)

Career information
- NBA draft: 2011: 1st round, 23rd overall pick
- Drafted by: Houston Rockets
- Playing career: 2008–present

Career history
- 2008–2014: Real Madrid
- 2009–2010: →Palencia
- 2014–2018: Chicago Bulls
- 2018–2019: New Orleans Pelicans
- 2019: Milwaukee Bucks
- 2019–2023: FC Barcelona
- 2023–2025: Olimpia Milano
- 2025–2026: AS Monaco
- 2026–present: Valencia Basket

Career highlights
- NBA All-Rookie First Team (2015); EuroLeague MVP (2022); 2× All-Euroleague First Team (2021, 2022); 3× All-Euroleague Second Team (2013, 2014, 2023); 2× EuroLeague Rising Star (2011, 2012); Lega Serie A champion (2024); Italian Supercup winner (2024); Lega Serie A Finals MVP (2024); LNB Élite champion (2026); French Cup winner (2026); French League Cup winner (2026); French Supercup winner (2025); 3× Liga ACB champion (2013, 2021, 2023); 4× Spanish Cup winner (2012, 2014, 2021, 2022); 2× Spanish Supercup winner (2012, 2013); 2× Liga ACB MVP (2013, 2020); 2× Liga ACB Finals MVP (2021, 2023); 4× All-Liga ACB First Team (2013, 2014, 2020, 2021); 2× All-Liga ACB Second Team (2022, 2023); 2× Spanish Cup MVP (2014, 2022); Spanish Supercup MVP (2013); FIBA U20 EuroBasket MVP (2011)
- Stats at NBA.com
- Stats at Basketball Reference
Medals
Men's basketball
Representing Spain
Summer Olympics
Bronze medal – third place	2016 Rio de Janeiro
EuroBasket
Gold medal – first place	2015 France–Croatia–Germany–Latvia

Nikola Mirotić Stajović (Montenegrin Cyrillic: Никола Миротић Стајовић; born 11 February 1991) is a Montenegrin–born naturalized Spanish professional basketball player for Valencia Basket of the Spanish Liga ACB and the EuroLeague. As a power forward he is a five-time All-EuroLeague Team member, previously playing for Real Madrid of the Liga ACB. Mirotić was drafted with the 23rd pick in the 2011 NBA draft, and played in the NBA from 2014 for the Chicago Bulls, New Orleans Pelicans, and Milwaukee Bucks, before returning to Spain with Barcelona in 2019.

== Early life ==
Growing up in Montenegro, football was Mirotić's true passion. As he got older, his family realized his height could be a lot more useful for another sport. At the age of 13, his grandfather introduced him to basketball. Mirotić started playing basketball with the Joker School in Podgorica run by retired professional basketball player Jadran Vujačić.

In the summer of 2005, at the age of 14, Mirotić signed a junior contract with Real Madrid.

== Professional career ==
=== Real Madrid (2008–2014) ===
After playing for the Real Madrid juniors from 2006 to 2008, Mirotić signed with the Real Madrid senior team in 2008. During the 2010–11 Euroleague season, he emerged as one of his team's most valuable players, and won the EuroLeague Rising Star award. In April 2011, he signed a five-year contract extension with Real Madrid. With Real Madrid, he won the Spanish King's Cup and the Spanish Supercup in 2012.

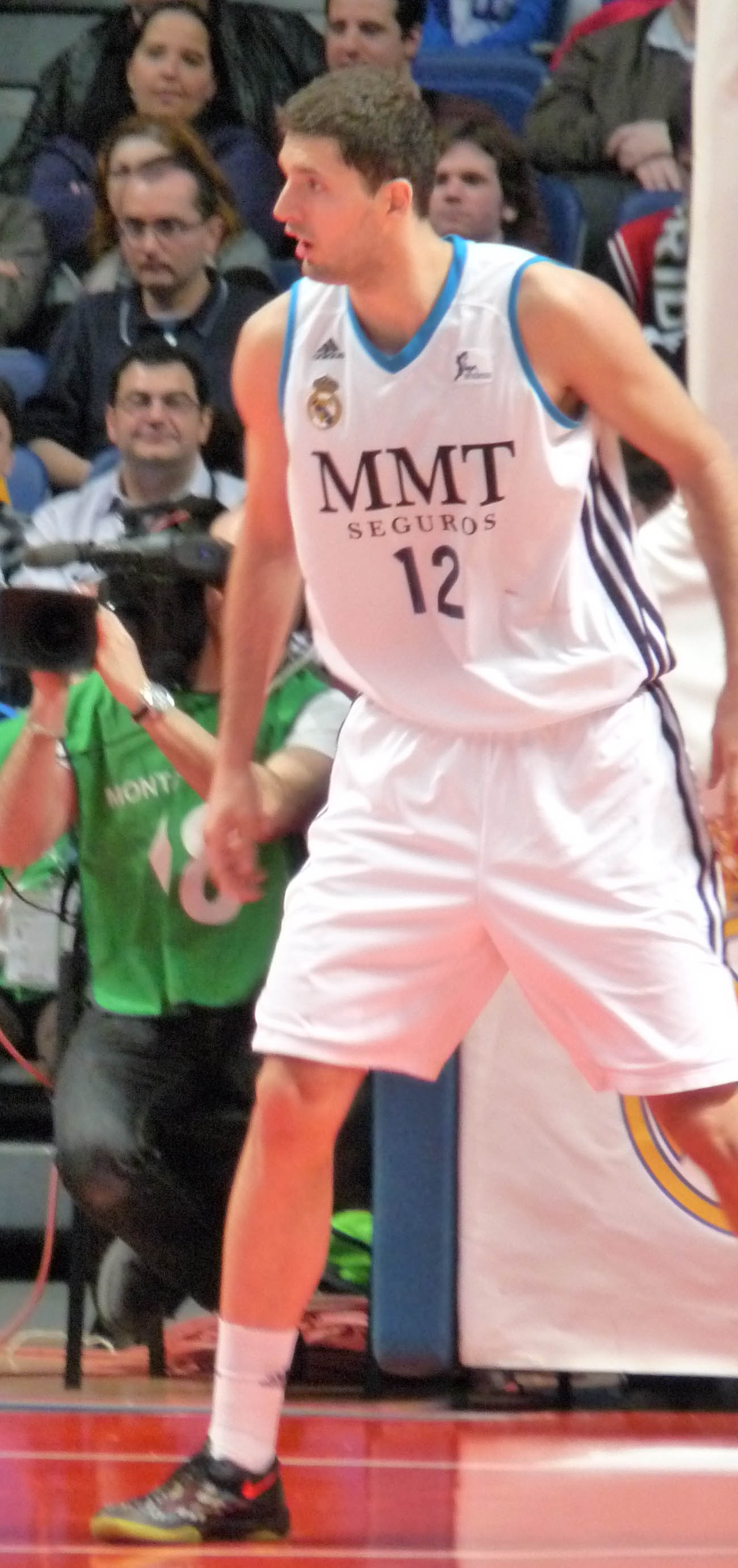
Mirotić with Real Madrid in 2013

On 23 June 2011, Mirotić was selected by the Houston Rockets with the 23rd overall pick in the 2011 NBA draft. He was later traded to the Minnesota Timberwolves, and again to the Chicago Bulls on draft night.

In the 2012–13 Euroleague season, he finished second in the EuroLeague Rising Star voting to Kostas Papanikolaou, and he was named to the All-EuroLeague Second Team. In May 2014, he was named to the All-EuroLeague Second Team, for the second consecutive season.

In a total of 97 EuroLeague games for Real Madrid, Mirotić averaged 10.8 points and 4.5 rebounds per game.

=== Chicago Bulls (2014–2018) ===
==== 2014–15 season ====
On 18 July 2014, Mirotić signed with the Chicago Bulls to a reported three-year, $16.6 million contract. In addition, Mirotić was required to pay $3 million to Real Madrid for his contract buyout.

On 19 December 2014, Mirotić scored a then career-high 27 points, as he converted all six of his three-pointers, in a 103–97 win over the Memphis Grizzlies. On 5 January 2015, he was named the Eastern Conference Rookie of the Month for games played in December. During the NBA's All-Star Weekend, Mirotić played for World Team in the Rising Stars Challenge. He scored 16 points on 6-of-9 shooting from the field in the World's 121–112 win over Team USA. On 1 March, he scored a career-high 29 points in a loss to the Los Angeles Clippers. With injuries impacting teammates during the month of March, Mirotić was expected to fill a larger role for his team. He averaged 20.8 points and 7.6 rebounds while playing 30.8 minutes per game. In his rookie season, Mirotić averaged 10.2 points, 4.9 rebounds and 1.2 assists in 82 games, giving him the recognition as a candidate for the Rookie of the Year Award. Mirotić finished second in Rookie of the Year voting with 335 votes behind Andrew Wiggins who received 604 votes. He played his first post-season game in the NBA on 18 April 2015 in game 1 of the Bulls' first-round series match-up against the Milwaukee Bucks. In 13 minutes off the bench, he recorded 5 points and 5 rebounds.

==== 2015–16 season ====
At the beginning of the 2015–16 season, Mirotić had a starting role ahead of All-Star center Joakim Noah. He scored a team-high 19 points in the season opening win over the Cleveland Cavaliers. He started in all 18 games to begin the season, coming off the bench for the first time on 9 December against the Boston Celtics, scoring 10 points in 22 minutes of action. He continued coming off the bench following 9 December, in a back-up role to Taj Gibson. His next start came on 21 December against the Brooklyn Nets, as he started at small forward in place of Tony Snell. On 1 January, he recorded 17 points and a career-high seven assists in a 108–81 win over the New York Knicks. On 27 January, he was diagnosed with an acute appendicitis and was subsequently ruled out until after the All-Star break. He returned to action on 5 March against the Houston Rockets after missing 16 games. On 23 March, he scored a career-high 35 points in a loss to the New York Knicks.

==== 2016–17 season ====
On 26 December 2016, less than two weeks after falling out of the rotation for a couple of games, Mirotić recorded a then-season-high 20 points in a 90–85 win over the Indiana Pacers. After not playing by coach's decision in two straight games in early March so that management and the coaching staff could look at Joffrey Lauvergne, Mirotić landed on the inactive list. On 13 March, he returned from a three-game absence and scored 24 points on five three-pointers in a 115–109 win over the Charlotte Hornets. On 22 March, he scored a season-high 28 points in a 117–95 win over the Detroit Pistons. Four days later, he tied his season high with another 28-point effort in a 109–94 win over the Milwaukee Bucks. He had a third 28-point game on 30 March in a 99–93 win over the Cleveland Cavaliers. He had six three-pointers against both Milwaukee and Cleveland, becoming the first Bulls player to hit six or more three-pointers in back-to-back games.

==== 2017–18 season ====
On 25 September 2017, Mirotić re-signed with the Bulls. On 17 October 2017, Mirotić was sent to the hospital after engaging in a physical altercation with teammate Bobby Portis during practice. Portis punched Mirotić in the face resulting in Mirotić suffering a concussion and multiple facial fractures. Mirotić made his season debut on 8 December, scoring six points in 14 minutes in a 119–111 overtime win over the Charlotte Hornets. On 11 December, he scored 24 points in his first start of the season in a 108–85 win over the Boston Celtics. He hit 9 of 14 shots and grabbed eight rebounds in his third appearance. On 13 December, he scored 29 points on 11-of-18 shooting with nine rebounds in a 103–100 win over the Utah Jazz. On 26 December, he came off the bench to score 24 points in 28 minutes, as the Bulls won for the eighth time in 10 games, beating the Milwaukee Bucks 115–106.

=== New Orleans Pelicans (2018–2019) ===
On 1 February 2018, Mirotić was traded, along with a 2018 second-round pick, to the New Orleans Pelicans in exchange for Ömer Aşık, Tony Allen, Jameer Nelson, a 2018 first-round pick and the right to swap 2021 second-round picks with the Pelicans. He made his debut for the Pelicans two days later, scoring 18 points in a 118–107 loss to the Minnesota Timberwolves. On 10 February, he recorded 21 points and 16 rebounds in a 138–128 double-overtime win over the Brooklyn Nets. On 6 April, he scored a season-high 31 points and tied a season best with 16 rebounds in a 122–103 win over the Phoenix Suns. Three days later, he recorded 24 points and 16 rebounds in a 113–100 win over the Los Angeles Clippers, helping the Pelicans clinch a playoff spot. In game 1 of the Pelicans' first-round playoff series against the Portland Trail Blazers, Mirotić recorded 16 points, 11 rebounds and four blocks in a 97–95 win. In game 3, Mirotić scored a career playoff-best 30 points, as the Pelicans beat the Trail Blazers 119–102 to take a 3–0 lead in the series.

In the Pelicans' season opener on 17 October 2018, Mirotić scored 30 points on 6 of 8 from 3-point range in a 131–112 win over the Houston Rockets. Two days later, he scored a career-high 36 points in a 149–129 win over the Sacramento Kings. On 5 November, he had 16 points and matched a career high with 16 rebounds in a 122–116 loss to the Oklahoma City Thunder. On 9 January, he returned to action against the Cleveland Cavaliers after missing 12 games due to an ankle injury.

=== Milwaukee Bucks (2019) ===
On 7 February 2019, Mirotić was traded to the Milwaukee Bucks in a three-team trade involving Jason Smith, Stanley Johnson and Thon Maker. He missed the first four games with the Bucks upon being acquired with a calf injury, making his debut on 21 February against the Boston Celtics. He missed the final 11 regular-season games after suffering a fractured left thumb against the Los Angeles Lakers on 19 March. He made his return in the Bucks' opening game of the playoffs.

=== Barcelona (2019–2023) ===
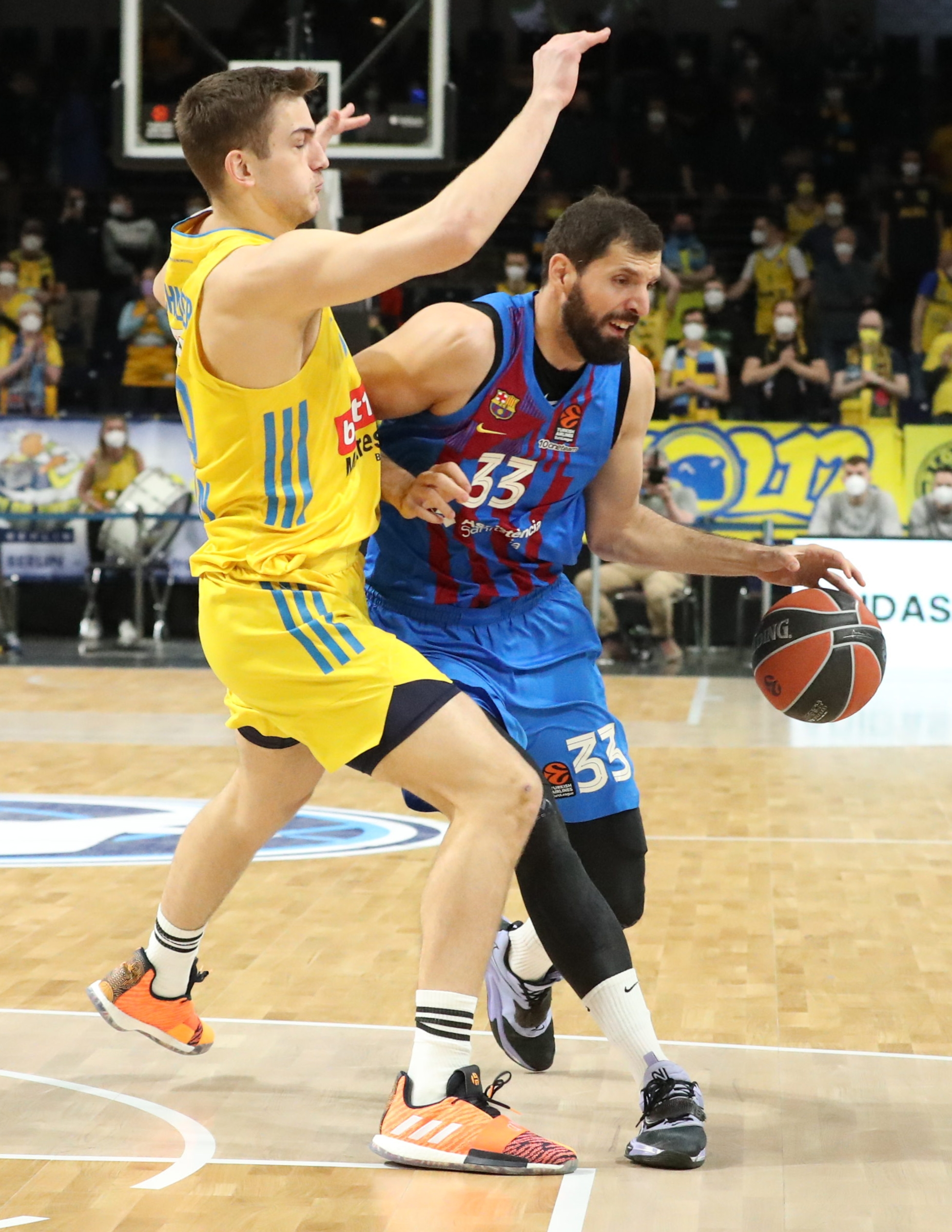
Mirotić with FC Barcelona in 2022

==== 2019–20 season ====
On 6 July 2019, Mirotić signed a three-year deal, with the option of an extension through to 2023, with FC Barcelona of the Liga ACB and the EuroLeague. According to sources, Mirotić's contract was worth €26 million, making him the highest-paid basketball player in Europe. On 27 June 2020, Mirotic was awarded the league's Most Valuable Player award. He became the fifth player in Liga Endesa history to have multiple MVP awards, joining Darryl Middleton, Arvydas Sabonis, Luis Scola and Felipe Reyes. Mirotić finished the season averaging 19.5 points and 5.7 rebounds per game. He extended his contract until 2025 on 25 September 2020.

==== 2021–22 season ====
In the 2021–22 season, he won his first EuroLeague MVP award, becoming the first Barcelona player to win the award in 14 years.

==== 2022–23 season ====
On 22 July 2022, Mirotić suffered an Achilles injury that ruled him out for the beginning of the 2022–23 season.

On 1 December 2022, Mirotić made his season debut against Alba Berlin, finishing the game with 19 points, 6 rebounds, 3 steals, and 2 assists in an 88–86 win.

On 15 May 2023, Mirotić was named into the All-EuroLeague Second Team alongside Mike James from AS Monaco Basket, Kevin Punter from KK Partizan, Darius Thompson from Saski Baskonia, and Wade Baldwin IV from Maccabi Tel Aviv B.C..

On 19 May 2023, Mirotić and FC Barcelona Bàsquet failed to win the EuroLeague despite reaching the third Final Four in a row. Barcelona lost in the semifinal against Real Madrid Baloncesto 66–78.

Mirotić finished the game with 3 points (1/10 FG, 1/2 FT), 6 rebounds, 1 assist, 1 steal, and 3 turnovers. He took the responsibility after the game. "I congratulate Real Madrid, they played a great game," Mirotic said. "I take a large part of the responsibility for us losing this game. I haven't been at the level expected of me, I haven't been able to help the team. I feel very bad. I say to our fans that I'm sorry, thank you for supporting us and for coming here."

On 20 July 2023, FC Barcelona Bàsquet officially announced that the club is unilaterally terminating Mirotić's contract. Mirotić still had two years left in his contract, but he became a free agent.

=== 2023 free agency ===
On 28 June 2023, Olimpia Milano head coach Ettore Messina said that Milan can't compete with the likes of Anadolu Efes, Fenerbahçe, Panathinaikos, Barcelona, or Real Madrid in the race to sign Mirotić, essentially denying a previous report about a deal between the two sides.

On 9 July 2023, reports in the Greek media emerged stating that Panathinaikos entered the race for Mirotić's signature, offering a two-year €8 million contract.

However, on 23 July 2023, Panathinaikos owner Dimitrios Giannakopoulos denied the rumors about the interest in Mirotić. "I looked at my iPad, and there are 10,000 messages," Giannakopoulos said on Saturday via his Instagram. "Now, even our plane is being watched, it is said that we went to Serbia to make a deal with [Nikola] Mirotić. No, we were at The Weeknd concert."

On 16 July 2023, the Serbian media reported that Mirotić landed in Belgrade to finalize an agreement with Partizan. Partizan head coach Željko Obradović reportedly had the biggest influence on Mirotić's decision to join the Serbian powerhouse.

On 22 July 2023, two days after officially parting ways with Barcelona, Mirotić stated that he wouldn't join Partizan due to insults and threats he received after news of his continuation in Obradović's team was published. Hours after the player's statement, Partizan responded by releasing a statement of their own, claiming that Mirotić's decision had nothing to do with the supposed threats. "The club publicly calls on Nikola Mirotić, out of his commitment to the truth, and he is a man who fights for the truth, to say who the people who threatened him are. The club's wish and plan was to build the team around the players who are currently under contract and Mirotić himself, but now that plan will have to be corrected. KK Partizan Mozzart Bet firmly believes that the reasons for not signing the contract by Nikola Mirotić have nothing to do with any threats but with some other things that the public will be able to see for themselves in the days ahead," Partizan wrote in the statement.

On 5 October 2023, Partizan head coach Željko Obradović claimed Mirotić received pressure from unnamed politicians and church members after his decision to join the Serbian powerhouse.

"I will tell you exactly as he told me. He didn't mention any names, but he told me he received calls from politicians and the church. Nikola did not reveal any names, but he told me it was about people from politics and the church. I know that much. He can confirm that," Obradović said in an interview with news magazine Nedeljnik.

However, on 2 November 2023, Mirotić denied the claims and rumors about being influenced by the Serbian Orthodox Church not to join Partizan.

"Wanting to debunk the slander that seeks to harm our Holy Church and its Patriarch, I have the need to state that I have not yet had the honor to meet His Holiness Patriarch Porfirije nor to communicate with him, directly or indirectly," Mirotić wrote in a post on Instagram.

=== Olimpia Milano (2023–2025) ===
==== 2023–24 season ====
On 3 August 2023, Mirotić signed a two-year deal with Olimpia Milano of the LBA and the EuroLeague.

On 19 October 2023, Mirotić moved to the Top 10 EuroLeague All-Time scoring list. Mirotić scored 3,242nd career point in the EuroLeague game against Real Madrid, overtaking Kyle Hines and Paulius Jankunas.

=== AS Monaco (2025–2026) ===
On 25 July 2025, Mirotić signed with AS Monaco of the French LNB Élite and the EuroLeague.

=== Valencia (2026–present) ===
On 15 September 2026, Mirotić signed a one-year deal with Valencia of the Spanish Liga ACB and the EuroLeague.

== National team career ==
Mirotić was a member of the junior national team of Spain. He helped Spain's U20 national team win the bronze medal at the 2010 FIBA Europe Under-20 Championship, where he was named to the All-Tournament Team. He also led Spain to the gold medal in 2011. Mirotić was the top scorer and MVP of the tournament, averaging 27 points (tournament record) and 10 rebounds per game.

In June 2015, Mirotić was named by head coach Sergio Scariolo as one of 17 candidates to try out for the senior Spain men's national basketball team that would play at the EuroBasket 2015. Mirotić made Spain's final 12-man roster, and he went on to win a gold medal at the tournament, in September 2015. He also played with Spain at the 2016 Summer Olympics, where he won a bronze medal.

On January 19, 2023, Mirotić confirmed he's retiring from the Spanish national team. "I haven't played with them for many years, I've focused a lot on giving my all to the club I'm at. Then in summer, I have many personal things, family, my businesses. And I am at an age, especially after having the injury and everything, in which I don't see myself returning with the national team," Mirotić explained.

== Career statistics ==
Legend
GP	Games played	GS	Games started	MPG	Minutes per game
FG%	Field-goal percentage	3P%	3-point field-goal percentage	FT%	Free-throw percentage
RPG	Rebounds per game	APG	Assists per game	SPG	Steals per game
BPG	Blocks per game	PPG	Points per game	PIR	Performance index rating
**Bold**	Career high

=== NBA ===
==== Regular season ====
Year	Team	GP	GS	MPG	FG%	3P%	FT%	RPG	APG	SPG	BPG	PPG
2014–15	Chicago	**82**	3	20.2	.405	.316	.803	4.9	1.2	.7	.7	10.2
2015–16	Chicago	66	**38**	24.9	.407	.390	.807	5.5	1.5	.9	.7	11.8
2016–17	Chicago	70	15	24.0	.413	.342	.773	5.5	1.1	.8	.8	10.6
2017–18	Chicago	25	3	24.9	**.474**	**.429**	.823	6.4	**1.6**	.6	.5	**16.8**
2017–18	New Orleans	30	11	**29.1**	.427	.335	.810	8.2	1.4	**1.0**	**.9**	14.6
2018–19	New Orleans	32	22	28.9	.447	.368	.842	**8.3**	1.1	.7	.8	16.7
2018–19	Milwaukee	14	3	22.9	.415	.356	**.870**	5.4	1.4	.7	.6	11.6
Career		319	95	24.2	.423	.359	.808	5.9	1.3	.8	.7	12.3

==== Playoffs ====
Year	Team	GP	GS	MPG	FG%	3P%	FT%	RPG	APG	SPG	BPG	PPG
2015	Chicago	11	0	14.9	.303	.233	.800	2.7	.8	.5	.5	5.7
2017	Chicago	6	6	27.0	.340	.286	.800	5.0	1.5	.7	.5	8.7
2018	New Orleans	9	**9**	**35.6**	**.480**	**.431**	.789	**9.6**	**1.7**	**1.1**	**1.3**	**15.0**
2019	Milwaukee	**14**	8	21.3	.376	.289	**.821**	4.3	.7	.7	.2	9.5
Career		40	23	21.3	.388	.318	.805	5.2	1.1	.8	.6	9.6

=== EuroLeague ===
*	Led the league

Year	Team	GP	GS	MPG	FG%	3P%	FT%	RPG	APG	SPG	BPG	PPG	PIR
2008–09	Real Madrid	1	0	2.1	.000	.000	.000	.0	.0	.0	.0	.0	-1.0
2010–11	Real Madrid	20	0	15.0	.500	.387	.857	3.3	.6	.5	.5	6.6	8.2
2011–12	Real Madrid	16	15	23.1	.525	.439	**.918***	4.5	.9	.8	.4	12.5	14.6
2012–13	Real Madrid	29	25	24.9	.475	.325	.851	5.3	.9	.7	**.9**	11.4	13.3
2013–14	Real Madrid	31*	31*	24.0	.508	.461	.811	4.6	1.2	**1.1**	.8	12.4	15.9
2019–20	Barcelona	28*	28*	**27.8**	.483	.331	.869	**6.9**	1.6	1.1	.3	**19.0**	**22.5**
2020–21	Barcelona	33	32	25.8	.533	.413	.848	5.9	1.0	**1.2**	.5	15.6	19.5
2021–22	Barcelona	**38**	**38***	24.4	**.570**	**.463**	.876	5.2	1.4	.9	.3	16.9	20.1*
2022–23	Barcelona	29	29	25.0	.498	.392	.804	4.3	1.2	1.0	.4	15.4	16.4
2023–24	Olimpia Milano	21	17	26.5	.526	.418	.847	5.7	.9	.8	.3	16.9	18.9
2024–25	Olimpia Milano	30	30	27.5	.475	.389	.893	6.4	**2.0**	1.0	.3	17.7	19.0
2025–26	Monaco	31	8	18.5	.478	.393	.821	4.3	1.4	.7	.3	11.0	12.7
Career		307	253	22.7	.507	.400	.857	5.2	1.2	.9	.5	14.4	17.1

=== Domestic leagues ===
†	Denotes season in which Mirotic won the Domestic League

Season	Team	League	GP	MPG	FG%	3P%	FT%	RPG	APG	SPG	BPG	PPG
2008–09	(Spain) Real Madrid	ACB	5	3.3	.250	.000	.500	—	—	—	—	.8
2009–10	(Spain) Palencia	LEB Oro	31	20.2	.441	.346	.573	3.2	.8	.8	.8	8.0
2010–11	(Spain) Real Madrid	ACB	35	16.5	.505	.393	.890	3.5	.7	.6	.4	7.9
2011–12	(Spain) Real Madrid	ACB	42	19.5	.490	.387	.702	4.3	.7	.7	.5	8.9
2012–13†	(Spain) Real Madrid	ACB	43	23.4	.503	.417	.794	5.4	.9	1.0	.8	12.2
2013–14	(Spain) Real Madrid	ACB	43	22.6	.506	.350	.793	5.1	1.1	.9	.5	11.6
2019–20	(Spain) Barcelona	ACB	25	25.9	.507	.324	.897	5.2	1.4	1.1	.7	19.0
2020–21†	(Spain) Barcelona	ACB	38	21.6	.566	.457	.800	4.9	.8	.9	.7	14.0
2021–22	(Spain) Barcelona	ACB	40	23.8	.524	.411	.830	5.3	.8	.6	.5	15.0
2022–23†	(Spain) Barcelona	ACB	32	21.9	.482	.382	.947	4.6	1.4	.6	.3	13.6
2023–24†	(Italy) Olimpia Milano	LBA	25	23.5	.475	.402	.887	4.8	.8	.6	.5	15.4
2024–25	(Italy) Olimpia Milano	LBA	31	23.1	.471	.373	.906	4.4	1.5	.8	.4	15.9
2025–26†	(France) Monaco	LNB Élite	20	18.0	.473	.446	.916	3.4	1.1	.8	.4	11.7

== Personal life ==
Mirotić and his wife, Nina Vujačić, have one son. His wife is the daughter of his former coach and mentor, Jadran Vujačić, who also played professional basketball with Borac Čačak, KK Partizan and Budućnost Titograd.

Mirotić is an ethnic Serb and a Serbian Orthodox Christian. He received the Order of St. Sava in May 2017. Mirotić has participated in prayer walks and protests in Podgorica against the controversial religious law concerning the Serbian Orthodox Church.

== Awards and accomplishments ==
=== Professional career ===
- Spanish ACB League Finals MVP: 2021
- 3× Spanish King's Cup Winner: 2012, 2014, 2021
- 2× Spanish Supercup Winner: 2012, 2013
- 2× Spanish ACB League Champion: 2013, 2021
- All-EuroLeague First Team: 2021
- 2× All-EuroLeague Second Team: 2013, 2014
- Spanish ACB League MVP: 2013, 2020
- 4× All-ACB Team: 2013, 2014, 2020, 2021
- Spanish King's Cup MVP: 2014
- 2× EuroLeague Rising Star: 2011, 2012
- FIBA Europe Under-20 Championship MVP: 2011
- NBA All-Rookie First Team (2015)

=== Spain national team ===
Senior

- EuroBasket 2015: Gold
- 2016 Summer Olympics: Bronze

U-20

- 2010 FIBA Europe Under-20 Championship: Bronze
- 2010 FIBA Europe Under-20 Championship: All-Tournament Team
- 2011 FIBA Europe Under-20 Championship: Gold
- 2011 FIBA Europe Under-20 Championship: All-Tournament Team (MVP)
