= 2014 Copa del Rey de Baloncesto =

Spanish basketball cup season

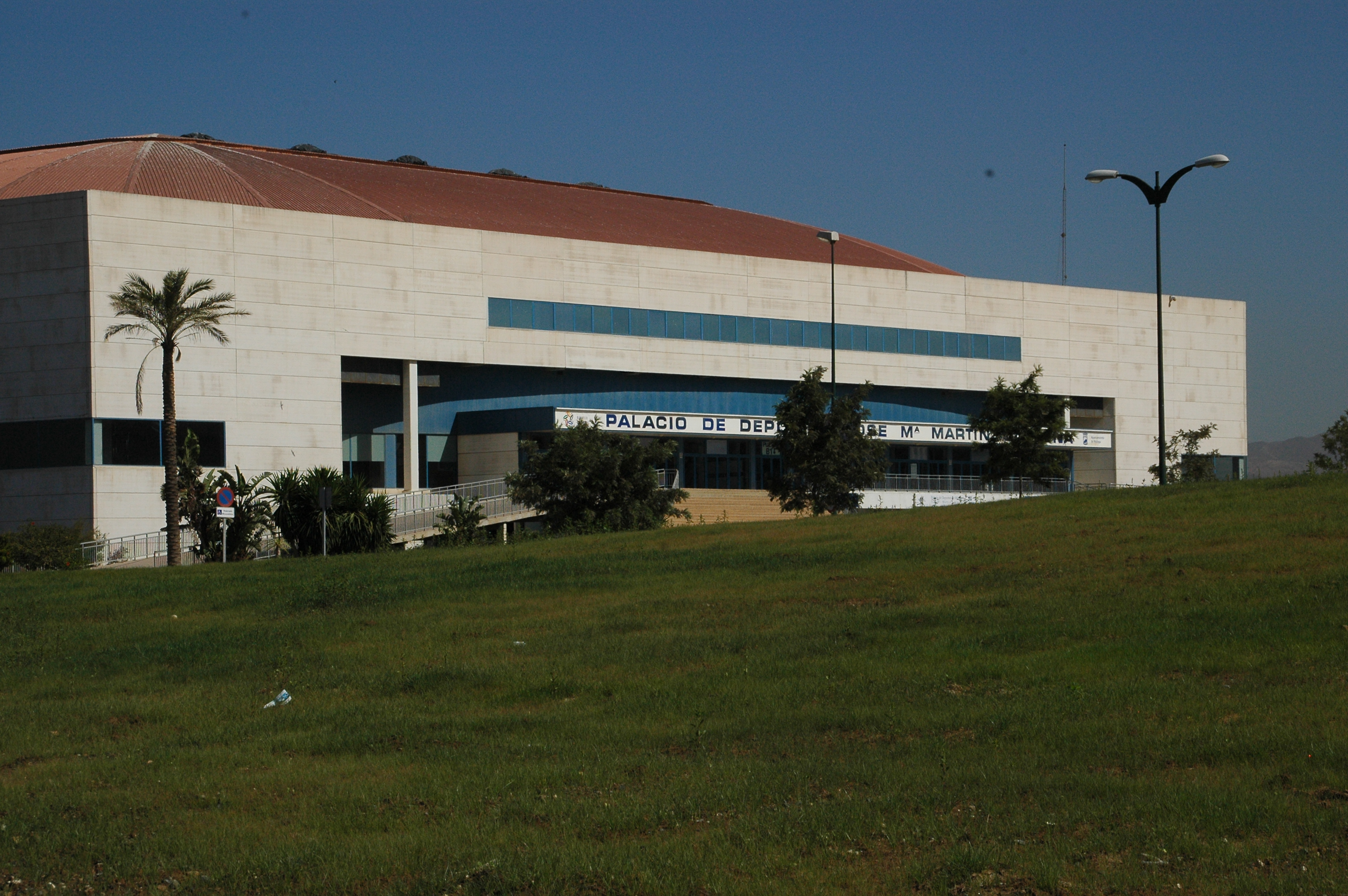
- Martín Carpena hosted the Copa del Rey

Tournament details
- Arena: Martín Carpena; Málaga
- Dates: 6–9 February 2014

Final positions
- Champions: Real Madrid (24th title)
- Runners-up: FC Barcelona

Awards and statistics
- MVP: (Spain) Nikola Mirotić

The 2014 Copa del Rey de Baloncesto was the 78th edition of the Spanish King's Basketball Cup. It was managed by the ACB and was held in Málaga, in the Martín Carpena on February 6–9, 2014. Real Madrid won their 24th cup.

== Qualified teams ==
The seven first qualified after the first half of the 2013–14 ACB regular season qualified to the tournament. As Unicaja, host team, finished between the seven first teams, the eighth qualified joined the Copa del Rey.

| Pos | Team | Pld | W | L | PF | PA | PD | Qualification |
|---|---|---|---|---|---|---|---|---|
| 1 | Real Madrid | 17 | 17 | 0 | 1481 | 1174 | +307 | Qualified as seeded teams |
| 2 | Valencia Basket | 17 | 15 | 2 | 1475 | 1241 | +234 | Qualified as seeded teams |
| 3 | FC Barcelona Lassa | 17 | 12 | 5 | 1315 | 1177 | +138 | Qualified as seeded teams |
| 4 | Unicaja (H) | 17 | 11 | 6 | 1335 | 1227 | +108 | Qualified as seeded teams |
| 5 | Herbalife Gran Canaria | 17 | 11 | 6 | 1273 | 1209 | +64 | |
| 6 | CAI Zaragoza | 17 | 9 | 8 | 1313 | 1263 | +50 | |
| 7 | Laboral Kutxa | 17 | 9 | 8 | 1385 | 1389 | −4 | |
| 8 | Iberostar Tenerife | 17 | 9 | 8 | 1341 | 1365 | −24 | |

Source: ACB
(H) Hosts

== Draw ==
The 2014 Copa del Rey de Baloncesto was drawn on 27 January 2014 at approximately 12:00 CET and was broadcast live on YouTube and on TV in many countries. The seeded teams were paired in the quarterfinals with the non-seeded teams. There were not any restrictions for the draw of the semifinals. As in recent season, the first qualified team plays its quarterfinal game on Thursday.

== Bracket ==
Quarterfinals
7 February
FC Barcelona | 102
Iberostar Tenerife | 60
7 February
Valencia Basket | 74
Laboral Kutxa | 73
6 February
Real Madrid | 83
Herbalife Gran Canaria | 60
6 February
Unicaja | 74
CAI Zaragoza | 79

Semifinals
8 February
FC Barcelona | 89
Valencia Basket | 81
8 February
Real Madrid | 98
CAI Zaragoza | 66

Final
9 February
FC Barcelona | 76
Real Madrid | 77

=== Quarterfinals ===
La 1

February 6
19:10 GTM+1

Report
Stats

| Real Madrid | 83–60 | Herbalife Gran Canaria |
Scoring by quarter: 19–9, 22–11, 20–23, 22–17
| Pts: Fernández, Mirotić 17; Rebs: Bourousis 11; Asts: Rodríguez 8 PIR: three players 20 | | Pts: Tavares 16; Rebs: Tavares 12; Asts: Bellas 4 PIR: Tavares 31 |

Martín Carpena, Málaga
Attendance: 10,700
Referees: Pérez Pizarro, Conde, Calatrava

FORTA

February 6
21:30 GTM+1

Report
Stats

| Unicaja | 74–79 | CAI Zaragoza |
Scoring by quarter: 11–15, 27–16, 13–25, 16–18
| Pts: Caner-Medley 21; Rebs: Caner-Medley 10; Asts: Granger 5 PIR: Caner-Medley 21 | | Pts: Rudež 16; Rebs: Sanikidze 8 Asts: Llompart 7 PIR: Roll, Shermadini 18 |

Martín Carpena, Málaga
Attendance: 10,700
Referees: García González, Pérez Pérez, Cortés

La 1

February 7
19:10 GTM+1

Report
Stats

| Valencia Basket | 74–73 | Laboral Kutxa |
Scoring by quarter: 17–26, 18–19, 20–17, 19–11
| Pts: Lafayette, Martínez 13; Rebs: Doellman 11; Asts: Lafayette 6 PIR: Lafayette, Martínez 12 | | Pts: Nocioni 18; Rebs: Nocioni 8 Asts: Nocioni 4 PIR: Nocioni 26 |

Martín Carpena, Málaga
Attendance: 10,200
Referees: Martín Bertrán, Jiménez Trujillo, Perea

FORTA

February 7
21:30 GTM+1

Report
Stats

| FC Barcelona | 102–60 | Iberostar Tenerife |
Scoring by quarter: 22–16, 32–18, 21–14, 27–12
| Pts: Huertas 13; Rebs: Tomić 8 Asts: Huertas, Oleson 5 PIR: Huertas 19 | | Pts: Úriz 12; Rebs: Sikma 8 Asts: Richotti 6 PIR: Gutiérrez 14 |

Martín Carpena, Málaga
Attendance: 9,300
Referees: Hierrezuelo, Bultó, Peruga

=== Semifinals ===
La 1

February 8
19:10 GTM+1

Report
Stats

| Real Madrid | 98–66 | CAI Zaragoza |
Scoring by quarter: 22–15, 32–22, 23–13, 21–16
| Pts: Fernández 16; Rebs: Reyes 6 Asts: Rodríguez 11; PIR: Rodríguez 23 | | Pts: Shermadini 19; Rebs: Shermadini 8 Asts: Llompart, Roll 4 PIR: Shermadini 30 |

Martín Carpena, Málaga
Attendance: 10,800
Referees: Hierrezuelo, Pérez Pérez, Cortés

FORTA

February 8
21:30 GTM+1

Report
Stats

| FC Barcelona | 89–81 | Valencia Basket |
Scoring by quarter: 31–9, 16–24, 16–15, 18–27
| Pts: Navarro 20; Rebs: three players 6 Asts: Huertas 8 PIR: Navarro 27 | | Pts: Sato 21; Rebs: Sato 11; Asts: Lafayette, Ribas 3 PIR: Sato 29 |

Martín Carpena, Málaga
Attendance: 10,600
Referees: Pérez Pizarro, Conde, Bultó

=== Final ===
La 1

February 9
18:00 GTM+1

Report
Stats

| FC Barcelona | 76–77 | Real Madrid |
Scoring by quarter: 17–16, 25–22, 17–22, 17–17
| Pts: Huertas 15; Rebs: Tomić 9 Asts: Huertas 8 PIR: Huertas 17 | | Pts: Fernández 19; Rebs: Mirotić 11; Asts: Llull 6 PIR: Mirotić 32 |

Martín Carpena, Málaga
Attendance: 11,000
Referees: Hierrezuelo, García González, Conde

2014 Copa del Rey winners
Real Madrid
24th title
