= Serhiy Lishchuk =

Ukrainian basketball player (born 1982)

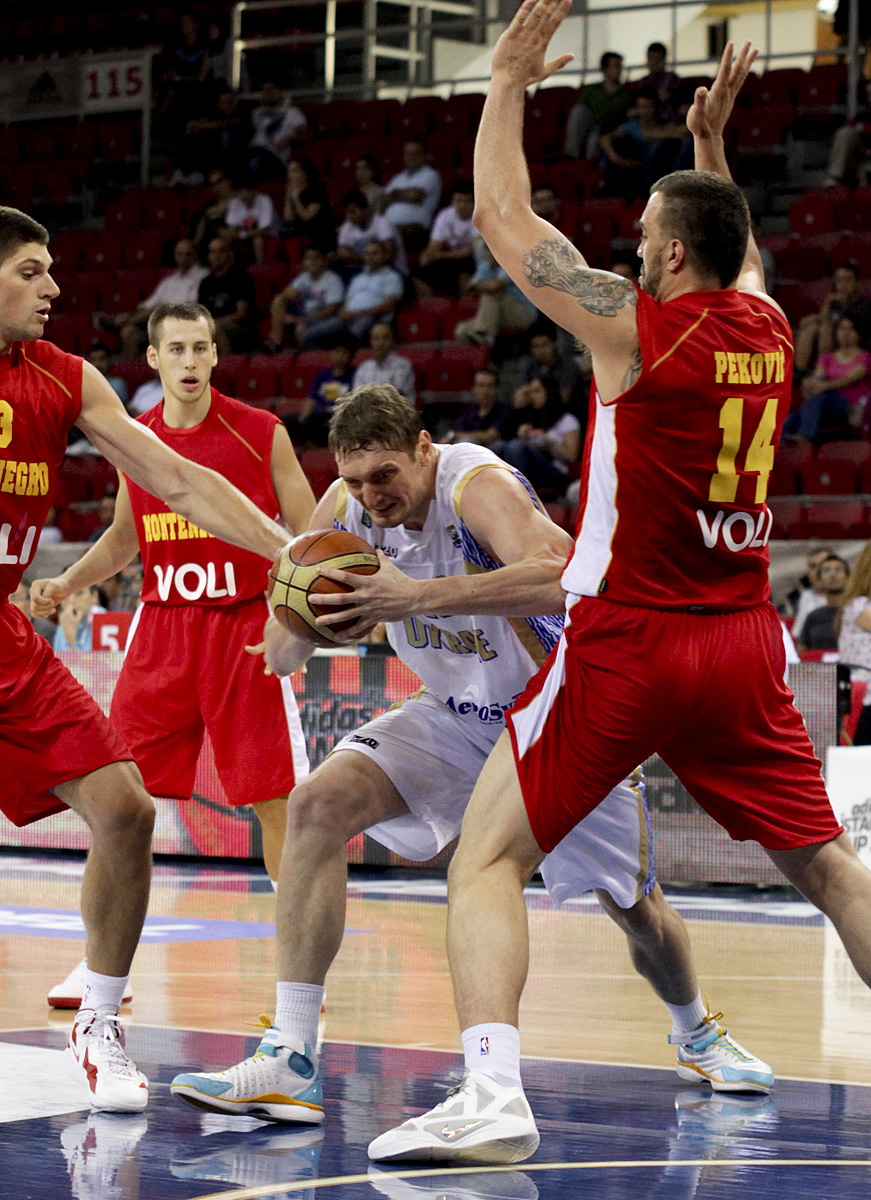
- Lishchuk playing with Ukraine in 2011

Personal information
- Born: March 31, 1982 (age 44) Rivne, Ukrainian SSR
- Listed height: 7 ft 1 in (2.16 m)
- Listed weight: 265 lb (120 kg)

Career information
- NBA draft: 2004: 2nd round, 49th overall pick
- Drafted by: Memphis Grizzlies
- Playing career: 1998–2016
- Position: Center / power forward

Career history
- 1998–2003: Pulsar Rovno
- 2003–2005: Khimik
- 2005–2009: Azovmash
- 2009–2015: Valencia
- 2015–2016: Murcia

Career highlights
- 2× EuroCup champion (2010, 2014); 3× Ukrainian Cup winner (2006, 2008, 2009); 4× Ukrainian SuperLeague champion (2006–2009)
- Stats at Basketball Reference

Serhiy Lishchuk (alternate spelling: Sergei Lishouk) (Ukrainian: Сергій Ліщук; born March 31, 1982) is a Ukrainian retired basketball player. Lishchuk played 18 seasons as a professional player in Ukraine and Spain.

== Professional career ==
=== Europe ===
Lishchuk began his professional career in his native Ukraine. On September 2, 2009, he signed with the Spanish club València Bàsket. With Valencia, he won the 2nd-tier level European-wide league, the EuroCup, during both the 2009–10 season and the 2013–14 season. He left Valencia on June 22, 2015. On July 23, 2015, he signed with the Spanish club UCAM Murcia of the Liga ACB.

=== NBA draft rights ===
Lishchuk was selected by the NBA's Memphis Grizzlies in the 2004 NBA draft. On February 21, 2008, his NBA draft rights were traded to the Houston Rockets, in exchange for the draft rights to Malick Badiane.

On December 15, 2010, Lishchuk's draft rights were traded to Los Angeles Lakers, in a three-way trade with the New Jersey Nets. On July 13, 2014, Lishchuk's draft rights were traded back to the Rockets, from the Lakers, in exchange for Jeremy Lin and two 2015 NBA draft picks.

On December 19, 2014, the Rockets traded Lishchuk's draft rights to the Philadelphia 76ers, in a three-team trade that sent Corey Brewer to the Houston Rockets. On January 7, 2015, his draft rights were traded to the Los Angeles Clippers for Jared Cunningham, the draft rights to Cenk Akyol, and cash.

On January 22, 2016, Lishchuk's draft rights were traded back to the Houston Rockets, along with Josh Smith and cash considerations, in exchange for the draft rights to Maarty Leunen.

== Ukrainian national team ==
Lishchuk has been a member of the senior men's Ukrainian national basketball team. With his senior national team, he played at the EuroBasket 2001, the EuroBasket 2005, and the EuroBasket 2011.

== Career statistics ==
Legend
GP	Games played	GS	Games started	MPG	Minutes per game
FG%	Field-goal percentage	3P%	3-point field-goal percentage	FT%	Free-throw percentage
RPG	Rebounds per game	APG	Assists per game	SPG	Steals per game
BPG	Blocks per game	PPG	Points per game	PIR	Performance index rating
**Bold**	Career high

=== EuroLeague ===
Year	Team	GP	GS	MPG	FG%	3P%	FT%	RPG	APG	SPG	BPG	PPG	PIR
2010–11	Valencia	**21**	**3**	**16.2**	**.443**	**.333**	.536	**4.9**	**.4**	**.3**	**.9**	**6.3**	**6.9**
2014–15	Valencia	6	**3**	12.2	.333	.000	**.667**	2.5	.2	.2	.2	3.0	.8
Career		27	6	15.3	.419	.333	.565	4.4	.4	.3	.7	5.6	5.5
