= 2013 Supercopa de España de Baloncesto =

The Supercopa de España de Baloncesto 2013 was the 10th edition of the tournament. It is also called Supercopa Endesa for sponsorship reasons.

It was played in the Fernando Buesa Arena in Vitoria-Gasteiz.

== Participant teams ==
Participant teams were known officially on 21 June 2013.

Team	Qualification	Participation
Real Madrid	2012–13 Liga ACB champion	8th
Regal FC Barcelona	2013 Copa del Rey champion	9th
Bilbao Basket	2012–13 Eurocup runner-up	3rd
Laboral Kutxa	Host team	9th

== Semifinals ==
La 1

October 4
19:00 CEST

Stats

Real Madrid	100–61	Bilbao Basket
Scoring by quarter: 25–24, 28–11, 20–16, 27–10
Pts: Carroll, Mirotić 18; Rebs: Mirotić 7 Asts: Rodríguez 12; PIR: Rodríguez 28		Pts: Mumbrú 16; Rebs: Hervelle 8 Asts: López 3 PIR: Mumbrú 3

Fernando Buesa Arena, Vitoria-Gasteiz
Attendance: 7,523
Referees: Martín Bertrán, Pérez Pérez, Cortés

FORTA

October 4
21:30 CEST

Stats

Laboral Kutxa	73–98	FC Barcelona
Scoring by quarter: 25–27, 13–27, 13–22, 22–22
Pts: Nocioni 12; Rebs: Pleiß 10; Asts: Heurtel, Hodge 3 PIR: Pleiß 14		Pts: Nachbar 22; Rebs: three players 4 Asts: Sada 6 PIR: Nachbar 25

Fernando Buesa Arena, Vitoria-Gasteiz
Attendance: 9,584
Referees: Conde, Jiménez, Calatrava

== Final ==
La 1

October 5
19:00 CEST

Stats

FC Barcelona	79–83	Real Madrid
Scoring by quarter: 21–29, 23–17, 12–17, 23–20
Pts: Tomić 21; Rebs: Dorsey, Tomić 8 Asts: Huertas 10; PIR: Huertas 24		Pts: Mirotić 20; Rebs: Fernández 7 Asts: Fernández, Llull 2 PIR: Mirotić 22

Fernando Buesa Arena, Vitoria-Gasteiz
Attendance: 8,217
Referees: Conde, Jiménez, Cortés

Supercopa de España 2013
Champions
Real Madrid
Third title
