= Brad Oleson =

American basketball player (b.1983)

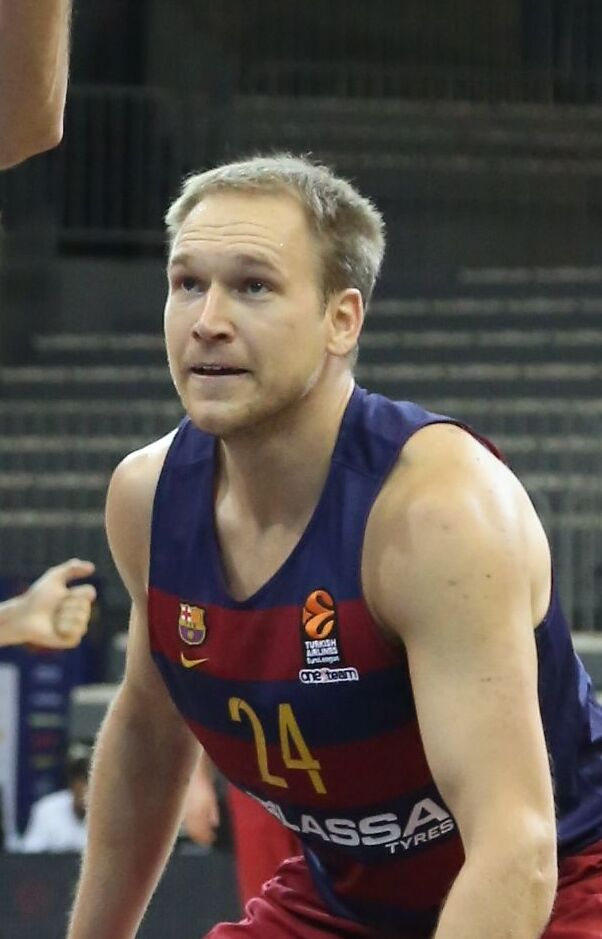
- Oleson with Barcelona in 2016

Personal information
- Born: April 11, 1983 (age 43) Fairbanks, Alaska, U.S.
- Listed height: 6 ft 3 in (1.91 m)
- Listed weight: 200 lb (91 kg)

Career information
- High school: North Pole (North Pole, Alaska)
- College: Peninsula College (2001–2002); Alaska–Fairbanks (2002–2005)
- NBA draft: 2005: undrafted
- Playing career: 2005–2019
- Position: Shooting guard / point guard

Career history
- 2005: Dodge City Legend
- 2005–2008: Rosalía de Castro
- 2008–2009: Fuenlabrada
- 2009–2013: Caja Laboral
- 2013–2017: FC Barcelona
- 2017–2019: Murcia

Career highlights
- Liga ACB Rising Star Award (2009); 2× GNAC Player of the Year (2004, 2005)

Bradley Scott Oleson Lashinski (born April 11, 1983) is an American-born naturalized Spanish former professional basketball player. He is a 6 ft 3 in (1.91 m) tall point guard-shooting guard. His hometown of North Pole, Alaska, celebrates Brad Oleson Day every year on April 24.

== Professional career ==
Oleson began his professional career in the year 2005, with the Dodge City Legend of the USBL. He then moved to Rosalía de Castro, where he first played in the Spanish LEB2 League, and then later in the Spanish LEB League. In 2008, he joined the Spanish ACB League club Fuenlabrada. In 2009, he was supposed to play for Real Madrid, but his rights were soon transferred to rivals Caja Laboral, in exchange for Pablo Prigioni and Sergi Vidal.

On 28 January 2013, Oleson signed a two-year deal with the Spanish team FC Barcelona Regal. On March 3, 2015, he signed a two-year extension with the club.

On 13 July 2017, Oleson signed a two-year contract with Spanish club UCAM Murcia.

== Spain national team ==
In October 2009, Oleson acquired Spanish nationality, and was selected to the senior men's Spain national team training camp pre-squad for the 2010 FIBA World Championship.

== Career statistics ==
Legend
| GP | Games played | GS | Games started | MPG | Minutes per game |
| FG% | Field-goal percentage | 3P% | 3-point field-goal percentage | FT% | Free-throw percentage |
| RPG | Rebounds per game | APG | Assists per game | SPG | Steals per game |
| BPG | Blocks per game | PPG | Points per game | PIR | Performance index rating |
| **Bold** | Career high |

=== EuroLeague ===
| Year | Team | GP | GS | MPG | FG% | 3P% | FT% | RPG | APG | SPG | BPG | PPG | PIR |
|---|---|---|---|---|---|---|---|---|---|---|---|---|---|
| 2009–10 | Baskonia | 12 | 1 | 13.7 | .408 | .400 | .857 | .9 | .4 | .3 | .1 | 5.0 | 2.8 |
| 2010–11 | Baskonia | 20 | 11 | 20.9 | .407 | .327 | .800 | **2.1** | 1.1 | .6 | .2 | 6.3 | 4.2 |
| 2011–12 | Baskonia | 10 | 6 | 21.9 | .531 | .448 | .917 | 1.4 | 1.7 | **.7** | .2 | 7.4 | 7.3 |
| 2012–13 | Baskonia | 15 | 13 | **22.9** | .483 | **.500** | .786 | 1.3 | 1.5 | **.7** | .3 | 8.6 | 7.1 |
| 2013–14 | Barcelona | 20 | 5 | 20.9 | .470 | .455 | .750 | 1.7 | 1.5 | .5 | **.4** | **8.9** | **9.1** |
| 2014–15 | Barcelona | 20 | 5 | 19.0 | .419 | .394 | **.944** | 1.5 | **2.4** | .7 | .2 | 6.5 | 6.7 |
| 2015–16 | Barcelona | **29** | 6 | 14.5 | .316 | .266 | .824 | 1.1 | 1.3 | .2 | .0 | 3.2 | 2.6 |
| 2016–17 | Barcelona | 24 | **18** | 21.4 | **.682** | .345 | .800 | 1.8 | 2.0 | .6 | .2 | 5.3 | 6.0 |
| Career | | 126 | 47 | 18.7 | .428 | .391 | .821 | 1.4 | 1.4 | .5 | .2 | 6.3 | 5.5 |

== Awards and accomplishments ==
- Top of The World Tournament: MVP (2003)
- 2x Great Northwest Athletic Conference: Steals Leader (2003, 2005)
- 2x Great Northwest Athletic Conference: Scoring Leader (2004, 2005)
- 2x Great Northwest Athletic Conference: Player of the Year (2004, 2005)
- Great Northwest Athletic Conference: 3 Point Shots Made Leader (2005)
- University of Alaska Fairbanks: All-Time Career Scoring Leader
- NCAA Division II All-American First Team: (2005)
- USBL All-Rookie Team: (2005)
- USBL Champion: (2005)
- Spanish LEB2 Champion: (2007)
- Spanish League Rising Star Award: (2009)
- 2x Spanish League Champion: (2010, 2014)
- Spanish Cup Winner: (2013)
- Spanish Supercup Winner: (2015)
