= 2015 ACB Playoffs =

The 2015 ACB Playoffs was the final phase of the 2014–15 ACB season. They started on May 28 and ended on June. FC Barcelona is the defending champions.

All times are CEST (UTC+02:00), except the game played in the Canary Islands (WEST, UTC+01:00).

== Bracket ==
Quarterfinals
Real Madrid	101	93
Herbalife Gran Canaria	74	86
Dominion Bilbao Basket	75	80	70
Valencia Basket	91	76	71
FC Barcelona	77	80
FIATC Joventut	55	74
Unicaja	69	82	89
Laboral Kutxa Baskonia	55	92	77

Semifinals
Real Madrid	81	89	103	90
Valencia Basket	71	93	100	84
FC Barcelona	91	91	84	66	77
Unicaja	60	70	89	77	74

Finals
Real Madrid	78	100	90
FC Barcelona	72	80	85

== Quarterfinals ==
=== Real Madrid v Herbalife Gran Canaria ===
29 May 2015
21:00

Boxscore

Real Madrid	101–74	Herbalife Gran Canaria
Scoring by quarter: 27–23, 23–15, 25–15, 26–21
Pts: Rodríguez 20; Rebs: Nocioni 7 Asts: Llull 6 PIR: Reyes 23		Pts: Newley 20; Rebs: Báez 7 Asts: Bellas 7 PIR: Newley, Salin 15

Barclaycard Center, Madrid
Attendance: 8,665
Referees: Hierrezuelo, García Ortiz, Rial

31 May 2015
12:40

Boxscore

Herbalife Gran Canaria	86–93	Real Madrid
Scoring by quarter: 19–18, 23–24, 17–26, 27–25
Pts: Oliver 18; Rebs: Tavares 5 Asts: Oliver 10; PIR: Oliver 30		Pts: Rodríguez 26; Rebs: Ayón 11; Asts: Ayón 3 PIR: Ayón 24

Gran Canaria Arena, Las Palmas
Attendance: 6,031
Referees: Jiménez, Perea, Oyón

=== FC Barcelona v FIATC Joventut ===
28 May 2015
21:00

Boxscore

FC Barcelona	77–55	FIATC Joventut
Scoring by quarter: 23–10, 19–11, 20–20, 15–14
Pts: Tomić 14; Rebs: Doellman 9 Asts: Satoranský 6 PIR: Satoranský, Doellman 21		Pts: Mallet 13; Rebs: four players 4 Asts: Hannah 3 PIR: Mallet 13

Palau Blaugrana, Barcelona
Attendance: 5,284
Referees: Pérez Pérez, Peruga, Fernández Sánchez

30 May 2015
18:30

Boxscore

FIATC Joventut	74–80	FC Barcelona
Scoring by quarter: 19–19, 17–19, 11–16, 27–26
Pts: Suton 13; Rebs: Suton 10; Asts: Ventura 5 PIR: Suton 14		Pts: Navarro 13; Rebs: Tomić 9 Asts: Satoranský 5 PIR: Satoranský 19

Palau Olímpic, Badalona
Attendance: 7,228
Referees: García González, Araña, Sánchez Mohedas

=== Unicaja v Laboral Kutxa Baskonia ===
28 May 2015
20:45

Boxscore

Unicaja	69–55	Laboral Kutxa Baskonia
Scoring by quarter: 18–11, 21–15, 22–9, 8–20
Pts: Granger 11; Rebs: Golubović 13; Asts: Toolson 4 PIR: Golubović 20		Pts: James 11; Rebs: Shengelia 6 Asts: Causeur 3 PIR: Shengelia 14

José María Martín Carpena, Málaga
Attendance: 8,245
Referees: Pérez Pizarro, Cortés, Guirao

30 May 2015
20:15

Boxscore

Laboral Kutxa Baskonia	92–82	Unicaja
Scoring by quarter: 20–16, 29–20, 23–24, 20–22
Pts: San Emeterio 19; Rebs: Begić 8 Asts: Adams, Causeur 4 PIR: Causeur 21		Pts: Granger, Marković 14; Rebs: Golubović, Vázquez 8 Asts: Granger 5 PIR: Marković, Vázquez 14

Fernando Buesa Arena, Vitoria-Gasteiz
Attendance: 9,286
Referees: Martín Bertrán, Redondo, Calatrava

1 June 2015
21:00

Boxscore

Unicaja	89–77	Laboral Kutxa Baskonia
Scoring by quarter: 23–21, 23–30, 18–8, 25–18
Pts: Granger 19; Rebs: Vázquez 11; Asts: Granger 8 PIR: Granger 25		Pts: James 16; Rebs: Begić, Tillie 6 Asts: Causeur 5 PIR: Tillie 17

José María Martín Carpena, Málaga
Attendance: 8,591
Referees: García González, Pérez Pérez, Araña

=== Dominion Bilbao Basket v Valencia Basket ===
28 May 2015
20:30

Boxscore

Dominion Bilbao Basket	75–91	Valencia Basket
Scoring by quarter: 22–21, 16–25, 22–19, 15–26
Pts: Mumbrú 18; Rebs: Todorović 9 Asts: Colom 4 PIR: Todorović 27		Pts: Ribas, Van Rossom 13; Rebs: Lučić 4 Asts: three players 2 PIR: Ribas 18

Bilbao Arena, Bilbao
Attendance: 7,314
Referees: Arteaga, Bultó, Martínez

30 May 2015
18:15

Boxscore

Valencia Basket	76–80	Dominion Bilbao Basket
Scoring by quarter: 21–15, 27–22, 16–27, 12–16
Pts: Lučić 17; Rebs: Harangody 10; Asts: Van Rossom 5 PIR: Lučić 19		Pts: Mumbrú 17; Rebs: Todorović 7 Asts: Colom 11; PIR: Colom 23

Pabellón Fuente de San Luis, Valencia
Attendance: 8,500
Referees: Conde, Peruga, Sánchez Montserrat

1 June 2015
20:30

Boxscore

Dominion Bilbao Basket	70–71	Valencia Basket
Scoring by quarter: 16–21, 17–24, 20–12, 17–14
Pts: Mumbrú 16; Rebs: Hervelle 7 Asts: Colom, Mumbrú 3 PIR: Williams 18		Pts: Van Rossom 14; Rebs: Dubljević, Lončar 5 Asts: Ribas 3 PIR: Dubljević 14

Bilbao Arena, Bilbao
Attendance: 8,217
Referees: Martín Bertrán, Jiménez, Cortés

== Semifinals ==
=== Real Madrid v Valencia Basket ===
4 June 2015
21:00

Report

Real Madrid	81–71	Valencia Basket
Scoring by quarter: 25–20, 21–16, 13–21, 22–14
Pts: Fernández 18; Rebs: Llull 8 Asts: Rodríguez 8 PIR: Fernández 25		Pts: Lončar 15; Rebs: Aguilar 5 Asts: Ribas 4 PIR: Lishchuk 15

Barclaycard Center, Madrid
Attendance: 9,760
Referees: Hierrezuelo, Pérez Pizarro, Martínez

7 June 2015
12:00

Boxscore

Real Madrid	89–93	Valencia Basket
Scoring by quarter: 22–31, 19–22, 30–20, 18–20
Pts: Llull 28; Rebs: Nocioni 7 Asts: Llull 7 PIR: Llull 29		Pts: Dubljević 18; Rebs: Harangody 8 Asts: Van Rossom 7 PIR: Dubljević 22

Barclaycard Center, Madrid
Attendance: 10,121
Referees: Arteaga, García González, Guirao

9 June 2015
21:00

Boxscore

Valencia Basket	100–103 (OT)	Real Madrid
Scoring by quarter: 18–26, 22–13, 30–25, 18–24, Overtime: 12–15
Pts: Harangody 21; Rebs: Dubljević 9 Asts: Nedović, Van Rossom 5 PIR: Harangody 22		Pts: Reyes 21; Rebs: Nocioni, Reyes 5 Asts: Llull 9 PIR: Reyes 28

Pabellón Fuente de San Luis, Valencia
Attendance: 8,500
Referees: Martín Bertrán, Conde, Cortés

11 June 2015
21:00

Boxscore

Valencia Basket	84–90	Real Madrid
Scoring by quarter: 22–24, 27–23, 17–25, 18–18
Pts: Dubljević 24; Rebs: Dubljević 8 Asts: Vives 6 PIR: Dubljević 31		Pts: three players 12; Rebs: Ayón 9 Asts: Llull 5 PIR: Nocioni, Reyes 15

Pabellón Fuente de San Luis, Valencia
Attendance: 8,500
Referees: García González, Jiménez, Bultó

=== FC Barcelona v Unicaja ===
5 June 2015
21:30

Boxscore

FC Barcelona	91–60	Unicaja
Scoring by quarter: 23–11, 26–18, 30–15, 12–16
Pts: Satoranský 14; Rebs: Tomić 7 Asts: Satoranský 5 PIR: Tomić 24		Pts: Vázquez 10; Rebs: Golubović 6 Asts: four players 2 PIR: Vázquez 13

Palau Blaugrana, Barcelona
Attendance: 4,377
Referees: Conde, Perea, Peruga

7 June 2015
12:40

Boxscore

FC Barcelona	91–70	Unicaja
Scoring by quarter: 23–23, 27–14, 17–18, 24–15
Pts: Satoranský 19; Rebs: Satoranský 7 Asts: Tomić 4 PIR: Satoranský 28		Pts: Granger 16; Rebs: Kuzminskas, Suárez 5 Asts: Granger 5 PIR: Suárez 16

Palau Blaugrana, Barcelona
Attendance: 4,503
Referees: Pérez Pizarro, Pérez Pérez, Calatrava

10 June 2015
21:00

Boxscore

Unicaja	89–84 (OT)	FC Barcelona
Scoring by quarter: 20–24, 18–18, 18–18, 18–14, Overtime: 15–10
Pts: Suárez 13; Rebs: Vázquez 13; Asts: Granger 6 PIR: Suárez 22		Pts: Thomas 17; Rebs: Tomić 7 Asts: Oleson 6 PIR: Tomić 22

José María Martín Carpena, Málaga
Attendance: 9,386
Referees: Jiménez, Perea, Araña

12 June 2015
21:00

Boxscore

Unicaja	77–66	FC Barcelona
Scoring by quarter: 20–14, 21–10, 14–16, 22–26
Pts: Granger 11; Rebs: Suárez 12; Asts: Marković, Toolson 3 PIR: Suárez 21		Pts: Huertas 12; Rebs: Doellman 7 Asts: Huertas 4 PIR: Tomić 17

José María Martín Carpena, Málaga
Attendance: 9,963
Referees: Pérez Pizarro, Pérez Pérez, Cortés

14 June 2015
17:00

Boxscore

FC Barcelona	77–74	Unicaja
Scoring by quarter: 18–20, 17–17, 22–20, 20–17
Pts: Thomas 14; Rebs: Doellman 12; Asts: Satoranský 5 PIR: Tomić 17		Pts: three players 10; Rebs: Granger, Kuzminskas 5 Asts: Granger 9 PIR: Granger 19

Palau Blaugrana, Barcelona
Attendance: 6,028
Referees: García González, Conde, Perea

== Finals ==
19 June 2015
19:00

Boxscore

Real Madrid	78–72	FC Barcelona
Scoring by quarter: 27–20, 20–20, 12–13, 19–19
Pts: Fernández 17; Rebs: Ayón 7 Asts: Rodríguez 8 PIR: Fernández 21		Pts: Hezonja 18; Rebs: Pleiß 6 Asts: Huertas, Satoranský 3 PIR: Hezonja 23

Barclaycard Center, Madrid
Attendance: 12,127
Referees: Conde, Jiménez, Cortés

21 June 2015
12:30

Boxscore

Real Madrid	100–80	FC Barcelona
Scoring by quarter: 31–10, 18–22, 26–24, 25–24
Pts: Llull 24; Rebs: Slaughter 6 Asts: Rodríguez 6 PIR: Llull 31		Pts: Doellman 24; Rebs: Doellman 5 Asts: Satoranský 4 PIR: Doellman 23

Barclaycard Center, Madrid
Attendance: 12,924
Referees: García González, Pérez Pérez, Bultó

24 June 2015
19:00

Boxscore

FC Barcelona	85–90	Real Madrid
Scoring by quarter: 17–17, 17–31, 33–17, 18–25
Pts: Tomić 29; Rebs: Doellman, Tomić 7 Asts: Satoranský 8 PIR: Tomić 36		Pts: Carroll 19; Rebs: Nocioni 6 Asts: Rodríguez 6 PIR: Carroll 16

Palau Blaugrana, Barcelona
Attendance: 7,247
Referees: Hierrezuelo, Pérez Pizarro, Calatrava
