= Gustavo Ayón =

Mexican basketball player (born 1985)

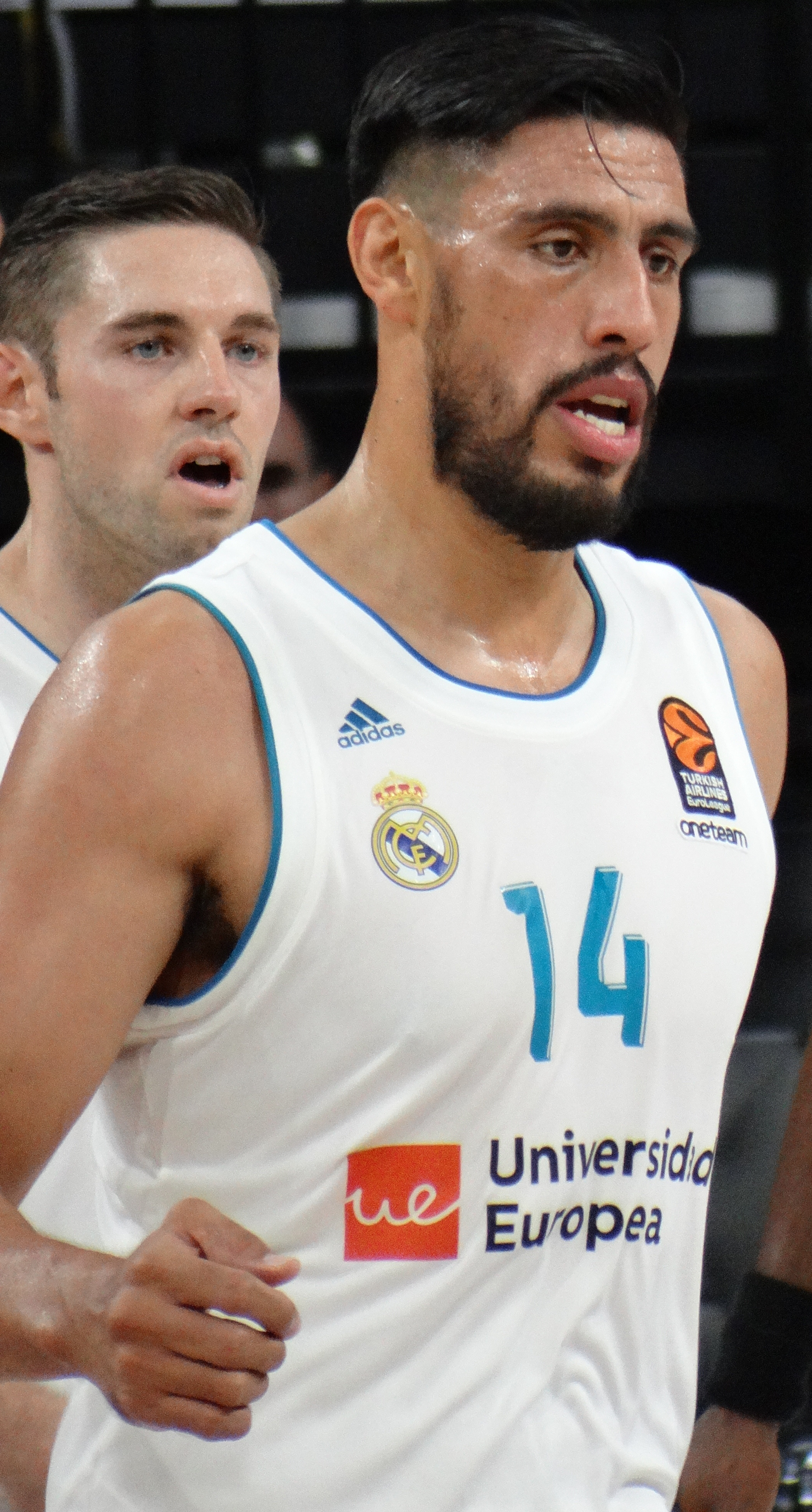
- Ayón with Real Madrid in 2017

Personal information
- Born: April 1, 1985 (age 41) Zapotan, Nayarit, Mexico
- Listed height: 6 ft 10 in (2.08 m)
- Listed weight: 250 lb (113 kg)

Career information
- High school: Vincent Memorial Catholic
- College: Universidad Popular Autónoma del Estado de Puebla
- NBA draft: 2007: undrafted
- Playing career: 2006–2023
- Position: Center

Career history
- 2006–2009: Halcones de Xalapa
- 2007: →Vaqueros de Agua Prieta
- 2008: →Dorados de Playa del Carmen
- 2009–2011: Fuenlabrada
- 2009: →Marinos de Anzoátegui
- 2009: →Illescas
- 2009–2010: →Tenerife
- 2011–2012: New Orleans Hornets
- 2012–2013: Orlando Magic
- 2013: Milwaukee Bucks
- 2013–2014: Atlanta Hawks
- 2014–2019: Real Madrid
- 2019–2020: Zenit Saint Petersburg
- 2020–2021: Astros de Jalisco
- 2021–2022: Capitanes de Arecibo
- 2023: Venados de Mazatlán

Career highlights
- FIBA Intercontinental Cup champion (2015); 2× EuroLeague champion (2015, 2018); BSN champion (2021); 2× All-EuroLeague Second Team (2016, 2017); 4× Spanish League champion (2015, 2016, 2018, 2019); 3× Spanish Cup winner (2015–2017); 2x Spanish Supercup winner (2014, 2018); All-Spanish League Second Team (2016); Spanish League Rising Star (2011); Spanish Cup MVP (2016); 2× Mexican League champion (2008, 2009); Venezuelan League champion (2009); FIBA AmeriCup MVP (2013); Centrobasket MVP (2014); CIBACOPA All-Star (2007); LNBP All-Star (2009)
- Stats at NBA.com
- Stats at Basketball Reference
Medals
Event	1st	2nd	3rd
FIBA AmeriCup	1	0	1
Centrobasket	1	0	0
Total	2	0	1
Men's basketball
Representing Mexico
FIBA AmeriCup
Gold medal – first place	2013 Venezuela	
Bronze medal – third place	2017 Argentina	
Centrobasket
Gold medal – first place	2014 Tepic	

Gustavo Alfonso Ayón Aguirre (born April 1, 1985) is a Mexican politician and former professional basketball player. He represented the senior Mexican national basketball team in international national team competitions. Standing at a height of 6 ft 10 in (2.08 m), he played at the center position. Ayon is a two−time All-EuroLeague Second Team selection.

== Early life and college career ==
Gustavo was born April 1, 1985, to parents Ayón Ayón and mother Linda Ayón.

Ayón attended at the Universidad Popular Autónoma del Estado de Puebla, in Mexico, for three years of college. He was named the Most Valuable Player of the Mexican College Championship Tournament, in leading his team to the National Championship.

Following that season, he signed with NCAA Division I San Jose State University. However, Ayón never played for the Spartans, instead choosing to sign with a Mexican professional team, Halcones UV Xalapa.

== Professional career ==
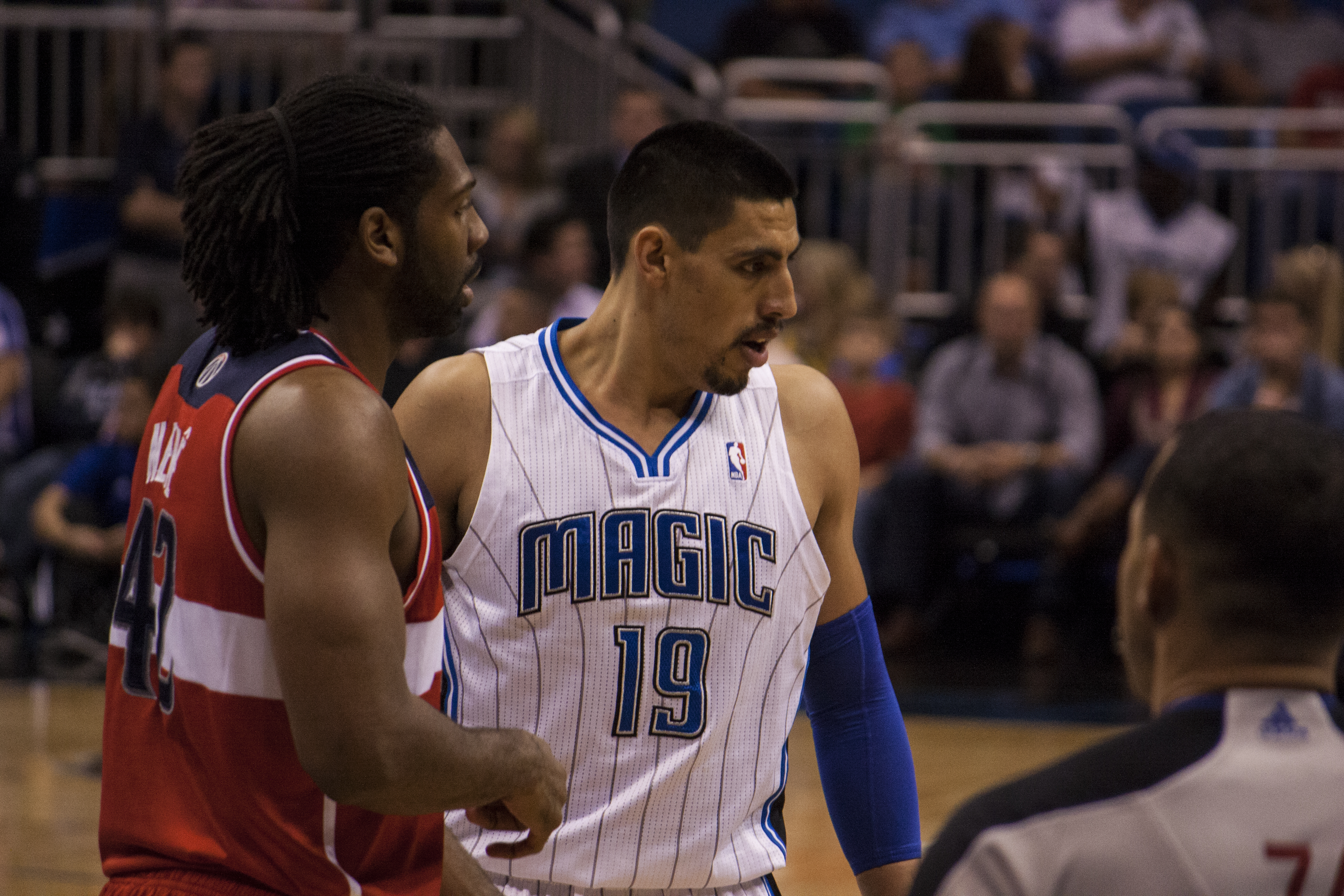
Gustavo Ayon (19) of the Orlando Magic and Nenê of the Washington Wizards.

=== Mexico ===
In the 2006 season, Ayón saw some action off the bench for Halcones UV Xalapa, as the team finished second in the Liga Nacional de Baloncesto Profesional. Ayón cracked the team's starting lineup the following season, and eventually led Halcones to back-to-back Mexican league titles, in 2007–08 and 2008–09. He averaged 10.2 points and 8.1 rebounds per game in 2007–08, and improved on that by averaging 13.2 points and 7.8 rebounds per game the following season. In what turned out to be his final game for the team, Ayón turned in a dominant, 24-point, 20-rebound, performance in leading his club to a 94–90 overtime victory over Soles de Mexicali, that clinched their second consecutive league title.

=== Spain ===
Following the 2008–09 season, Ayón signed with Baloncesto Fuenlabrada of the Spanish League. In November 2011, Ayón was named the Spanish League's ACB Player of the Month.

=== NBA ===
In December 2011, Ayón signed with the New Orleans Hornets, of the NBA, after paying Baloncesto Fuenlabrada with a $1.5-million buy-out clause. Ayón received a three-year contract, with the last year being a team option.

On July 11, 2012, Ayón was traded to the Orlando Magic, in a sign-and-trade deal for Ryan Anderson.

On February 21, 2013, Ayón was traded to the Milwaukee Bucks, along with guards Ish Smith and JJ Redick, for guards Beno Udrih and Doron Lamb, and forward Tobias Harris.

On July 25, 2013, he was waived by the Bucks.

On July 29, 2013, Ayón was claimed off waivers by the Atlanta Hawks. On February 12, 2014, Ayón scored a career high 18 points, in a 83–104 loss to the Toronto Raptors. On February 28, 2014, it was announced that Ayón would miss the rest of the 2013–14 season, following successful surgery to repair a right shoulder injury.

=== Return to Spain ===
On September 23, 2014, Ayón signed a two-year deal with Spanish club Real Madrid coached by Pablo Laso. In the 2014–15 season, Real Madrid won the EuroLeague, after defeating Olympiacos, by a score of 78–59 in the league's finals. Real Madrid eventually finished the season by also winning the Spanish League championship, after a 3–0 series sweep in the Spanish League finals series against Barcelona. With that championship, Real Madrid thus won the triple crown.

Ayón was named the EuroLeague MVP of the Round, in the first week of the playoffs, in the 2014–15 season, and in week nine of the regular season of the 2015–16 season.

On January 4, 2016, Ayón was named the EuroLeague MVP of the Month, for December 2015. On May 6, 2016, he was named to the All-EuroLeague Second Team, for the 2015–16 EuroLeague season. In May 2016, he was named the Player of the Month in the Spanish Liga ACB.

On July 14, 2016, Ayón signed a new three-year contract with Real Madrid.

In May 2018, Real Madrid won the 2017–18 EuroLeague championship, after defeating Fenerbahçe Doğuş in the final game with 85–80. Over 17 EuroLeague games, Ayón averaged 9.6 points, 6.1 rebounds and 2.9 assists per game.

In June 2018, Ayón helped guide Real Madrid to the 2017-18 ACB Spanish League Championship by defeating Kirolbet Baskonia.

In June 2019, Ayón helped lead Real Madrid to the 2018-19 ACB Spanish League Championship by defeating FC Barcelona Lassa

=== Russia ===
On July 26, 2019, Ayón signed a one-year deal with Zenit Saint Petersburg of the VTB United League and the EuroLeague. He averaged 12 points, 5 rebounds and 2 assists per game. Ayón parted ways with the team on July 26, 2020.

=== Return to Mexico ===
On September 30, 2020, Ayón signed with Astros de Jalisco of the Liga Nacional de Baloncesto Profesional.

=== Puerto Rico ===
On September 19, 2021, Ayón signed with Capitanes de Arecibo.

Ayón led the Capitanes de Arecibo to the Championship of the Baloncesto Superior Nacional (BSN) of Puerto Rico. This latest championship is the 16th professional championship for Ayón.

On August 20, 2022, Ayón announced his initial retirement from professional basketball. However, in April 2023 he announced that he would come out of retirement to play for Venados de Mazatlán, where he played a single game on April 26, 2023, against Halcones de Ciudad Obregón scoring 7 points and grabbing 7 rebounds.

== National team career ==
Ayón has been a member of the senior Mexican national basketball team since 2007. He played center for the seventh placed Mexicans at the 2007 FIBA Americas Championship, and the fifth placed team at the 2008 Centrobasket.

In 2013, Ayón led Mexico to victory in the gold medal game against Puerto Rico at the FIBA Americas Championship. Ayón was named to the All-Tournament Team, and was named the MVP of the tournament.

In August 2014, Ayón led Mexico to victory in the gold medal game against Puerto Rico at the 2014 Centrobasket. Ayón was named the MVP of the tournament. Later that month, he joined Mexico for the 2014 FIBA World Cup.

In 2015, Ayón was named to the 2015 FIBA Americas Championship All-Tournament Team, after tallying 17.7 points per game (2nd in the tournament), 12.4 rebounds per game (1st in the tournament), 3.5 assists per game (7th in the tournament), 1.3 steals per game (3rd in the tournament), and 1.2 blocks per game (1st in the tournament).

In June 2018, Ayón helped lead Mexico to a 78–70 victory over Team USA in 2019 FIBA Basketball World Cup qualification (Americas)

== Career statistics ==
Legend
GP	Games played	GS	Games started	MPG	Minutes per game
FG%	Field-goal percentage	3P%	3-point field-goal percentage	FT%	Free-throw percentage
RPG	Rebounds per game	APG	Assists per game	SPG	Steals per game
BPG	Blocks per game	PPG	Points per game	PIR	Performance index rating
**Bold**	Career high

=== NBA ===
==== Regular season ====
Year	Team	GP	GS	MPG	FG%	3P%	FT%	RPG	APG	SPG	BPG	PPG
2011–12	New Orleans	**54**	**24**	**20.1**	.536	.000	**.619**	**4.9**	**1.4**	**1.0**	**.9**	**5.9**
2012–13	Orlando	43	3	13.3	.536	–	.500	3.3	**1.4**	.3	.3	3.6
2012–13	Milwaukee	12	0	13.6	**.595**	–	.083	**4.9**	1.0	.8	.3	4.3
2013–14	Atlanta	26	14	16.5	.510	–	.400	4.8	1.1	**1.0**	.4	4.3
Career		135	41	16.7	.536	.000	.504	4.4	1.3	.7	.5	4.7

==== Playoffs ====
Year	Team	GP	GS	MPG	FG%	3P%	FT%	RPG	APG	SPG	BPG	PPG
2013	Milwaukee	3	0	2.3	.500	.000	.000	.0	.0	.0	.0	1.3
Career		3	0	2.3	.500	.000	.000	.0	.0	.0	.0	1.3

=== EuroLeague ===
†	Denotes seasons in which Ayón won the EuroLeague
*	Led the league

Year	Team	GP	GS	MPG	FG%	3P%	FT%	RPG	APG	SPG	BPG	PPG	PIR
2014–15†	Real Madrid	29	23	18.7	.623	—	**.794**	4.5	1.9	1.1	.6	8.1	11.7
2015–16	Real Madrid	27	27	**26.1**	.622	—	.619	**7.9**	2.3	**1.8**	**1.3**	11.6	**18.4**
2016–17	Real Madrid	**36**	**36**	20.6	**.699***	—	.485	5.2	2.3	.9	.6	9.8	13.7
2017–18†	Real Madrid	18	11	23.0	.577	—	.581	5.8	2.8	1.4	.8	9.3	14.2
2018–19	Real Madrid	31	6	19.7	.669	—	.542	6.0	**2.9**	.8	.8	8.3	14.5
2019–20	Zenit	26	14	21.4	.596	.000	.582	5.3	2.2	1.3	.5	**12.5**	14.3
Career		167	117	21.4	.634	.000	.587	5.8	2.4	1.2	.7	9.9	14.4

=== Domestic leagues ===
Season	Team	League	GP	MPG	FG%	3P%	FT%	RPG	APG	SPG	BPG	PPG
2006	Halcones de Xalapa	Mexico LNBP	6	12.8	.820	.000	.500	3.7	.8	.3	1.5	6.3
2007	Vaqueros	CIBACOPA	?	?	?	?	?	?	?	?	?	?
2007–08	Halcones de Xalapa	Mexico LNBP	29	18.6	.620	.000	.620	6.7	1.7	2.0	1.9	9.6
2008	Dorados de Playa del Carmen	Mexico LBS	?	?	?	?	?	?	?	?	?	?
2008–09	Halcones de Xalapa	Mexico LNBP	42	24.7	.640	.130	.600	7.8	2.6	1.2	1.5	12.0
2008–09	Baloncesto Fuenlabrada	Liga ACB	3	7.7	.500	--	--	1.3	1.0	.3	.3	1.3
2009	Marinos de Anzoátegui	Venezuela LPB	?	?	?	?	?	?	?	?	?	?
2009–10	Illescas	LEB Plata	8	24.1	.811	.000	.667	9.3	.8	2.1	.6	15.5
2009–10	Tenerife	LEB Oro	27	24.8	.584	.211	.770	6.8	1.0	1.9	1.4	9.7
2010–11	Baloncesto Fuenlabrada	Liga ACB	35	22.1	.663	.000	.603	6.5	1.3	1.5	1.4	10.8
2011–12	Baloncesto Fuenlabrada	Liga ACB	10	28.4	.676	.000	.808	8.1	1.6	1.6	.6	15.9
2014–15	Real Madrid	Liga ACB	39	18.2	.575	--	.631	5.0	1.3	.8	.6	7.4
