= Mario Hezonja =

Croatian basketball player (born 1995)

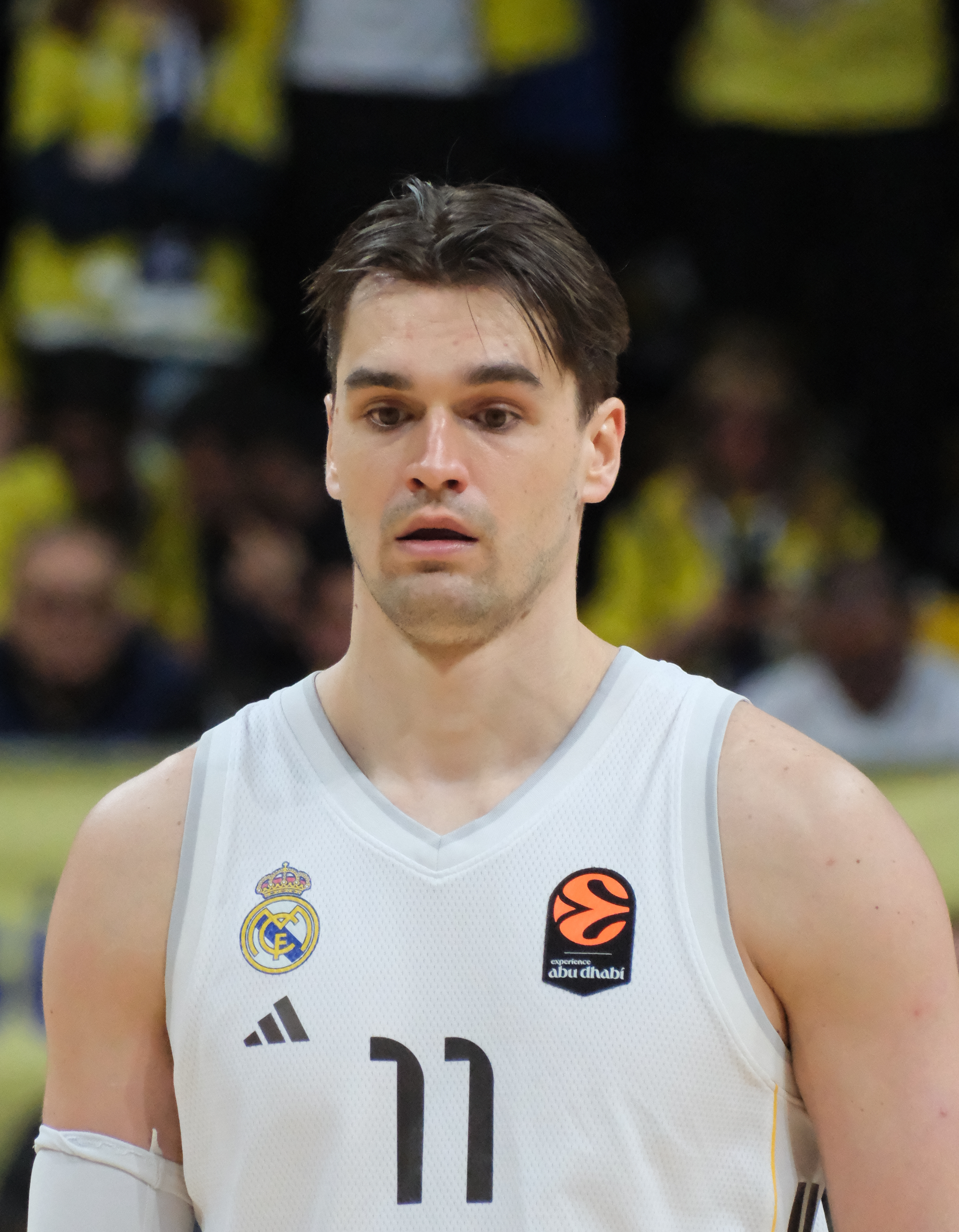
- Hezonja with Real Madrid in 2026

No. 33 – Cleveland Cavaliers
- Position: Small forward / shooting guard
- League: NBA

Personal information
- Born: 25 February 1995 (age 31) Dubrovnik, Croatia
- Listed height: 6 ft 9 in (2.06 m)
- Listed weight: 260 lb (118 kg)

Career information
- NBA draft: 2015: 1st round, 5th overall pick
- Drafted by: Orlando Magic
- Playing career: 2012–present

Career history
- 2012–2015: FC Barcelona
- 2012–2013: →FC Barcelona B
- 2015–2018: Orlando Magic
- 2018–2019: New York Knicks
- 2019–2020: Portland Trail Blazers
- 2021: Panathinaikos
- 2021–2022: UNICS Kazan
- 2022–2026: Real Madrid
- 2026–present: Cleveland Cavaliers

Career highlights
- EuroLeague champion (2023); All-EuroLeague Second Team (2024); 4× Liga ACB champion (2012, 2014, 2024, 2025); 2x Spanish Cup winner (2013, 2024); 2× Spanish Supercup winner (2022, 2023); Liga ACB MVP (2026); 2× All-Liga ACB First Team (2025, 2026); Greek League champion (2021); Greek Cup winner (2021); VTB United League MVP (2022); All-VTB United League First Team (2022)
- Stats at NBA.com
- Stats at Basketball Reference
Medals
Men's basketball
Representing Croatia
U17 World Cup
Bronze medal – third place	2012 Lithuania
U16 European Championship
Gold medal – first place	2011 Czech Republic

Mario Hezonja (Croatian pronunciation: [ˌmâːrio ˈxêzoɲa]; born 25 February 1995) is a Croatian professional basketball player for the Cleveland Cavaliers of the National Basketball Association (NBA). He has represented the Croatian national team in international competition. He was selected with the fifth overall pick in the 2015 NBA draft by the Orlando Magic.

== Junior career ==
Hezonja was promoted to the club level in his native Croatia when he was 12 years old, and at the age of 13, he stayed for two seasons with Dubrovnik. In 2010, Hezonja signed a contract with Croatian club Zagreb. In 2011, he won the Nike International Junior Tournament with Zagreb. He was also named to the All-Tournament team, alongside teammate Dario Šarić. He was forced to sit out the 2011–12 season because of mononucleosis.

== Professional career ==
=== Barcelona (2012–2015) ===
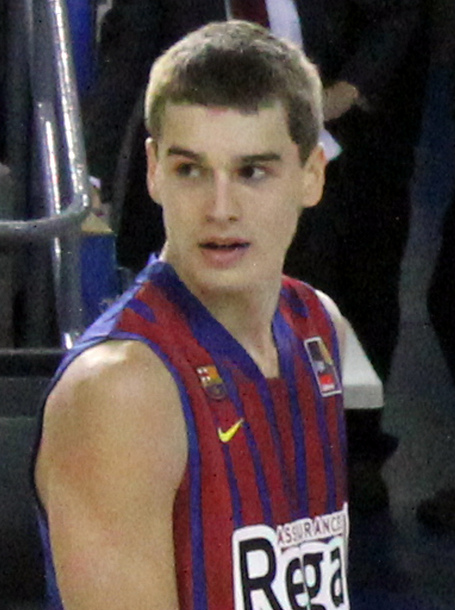
Hezonja with Barcelona B in 2012

In July 2012, Hezonja signed a three-year contract with Spanish club Barcelona, at the age of 17. He also had an option to extend his contract for an additional four years with the club. His former club, Zagreb, also got €150,000 in the name of a buyout, as he was still under contract. For the 2012–13 season, he was loaned to the reserve team of the club, Barcelona B of the LEB Oro, the Spanish second-tier level division. In 2012, Hezonja was nominated for the FIBA Europe Young Player of the Year Award, but Jonas Valančiūnas eventually won the award.

Hezonja played in the EuroLeague for the first time, in the 2012–13 season. He appeared in only 2 games, averaging 2.5 points and 2 rebounds per game.

During the EuroLeague's 2013–14 season, Hezonja played very limited minutes.

Starting with the 2014–15 season, Hezonja's role in the team increased, from playing only during the garbage time in the previous season, to around 15 minutes per game. On 1 February 2015, Hezonja hit 8-of-8 from the three-point line in a 2014–15 Spanish League season game, in a 101–53 Barcelona win, against La Bruixa d'Or Manresa, becoming the Spanish League MVP for week 19 of the season. Barcelona finished their participation in the 2014–15 EuroLeague season, after a quarterfinal series loss to Olympiacos. Over 22 EuroLeague games played, Hezonja averaged 7.7 points, 2 rebounds, and 1 assist per game.

On 23 April 2015, Hezonja declared himself eligible for the 2015 NBA draft, as an international "early-entrant", just days after Barcelona's elimination in the EuroLeague. He had been identified as a potential lottery pick early in his career, and surprised some by opting not to declare for the draft in 2014, his first year of eligibility. Some Spanish and Croatian media saw this move as the player's response to poor communication throughout the final few months with Barcelona's head coach Xavi Pascual; Pascal denied any problems in communication. Barcelona eventually finished the season losing in the final series of the 2015 Spanish League playoffs, after a 3–0 series loss to Real Madrid.

=== Orlando Magic (2015–2018) ===
On 25 June 2015, Hezonja was selected with the fifth overall pick by the Orlando Magic in the 2015 NBA draft. On 10 July 2015, he signed a rookie scale contract with the Magic.

2015–16 season

He made his debut for the Magic in the team's season-opening loss to the Washington Wizards on 28 October 2015, recording 11 points in 25 minutes off the bench. On 31 January 2016, he scored a then-season-high 17 points in a 119–114 win over the Boston Celtics. On 28 February 2016, he made his first career NBA start and dunked four seconds into the game, finishing with 13 points on 5-of-9 shooting in 27 minutes of action in a 130–116 win over the Philadelphia 76ers. On 2 March 2016, he scored a season-high 21 points in a 102–89 win over the Chicago Bulls. On 11 April 2016, he set career highs with seven assists and five steals while scoring 19 points in a 107–98 win over the Milwaukee Bucks.

The Magic finished the season with 35–47 record, missing the playoffs. Hezonja finished the season making 79 appearances with the averages of 6.1 points, 2.2 rebounds and 1.4 assists on 43.3 field goal percentage.

2016–17 season

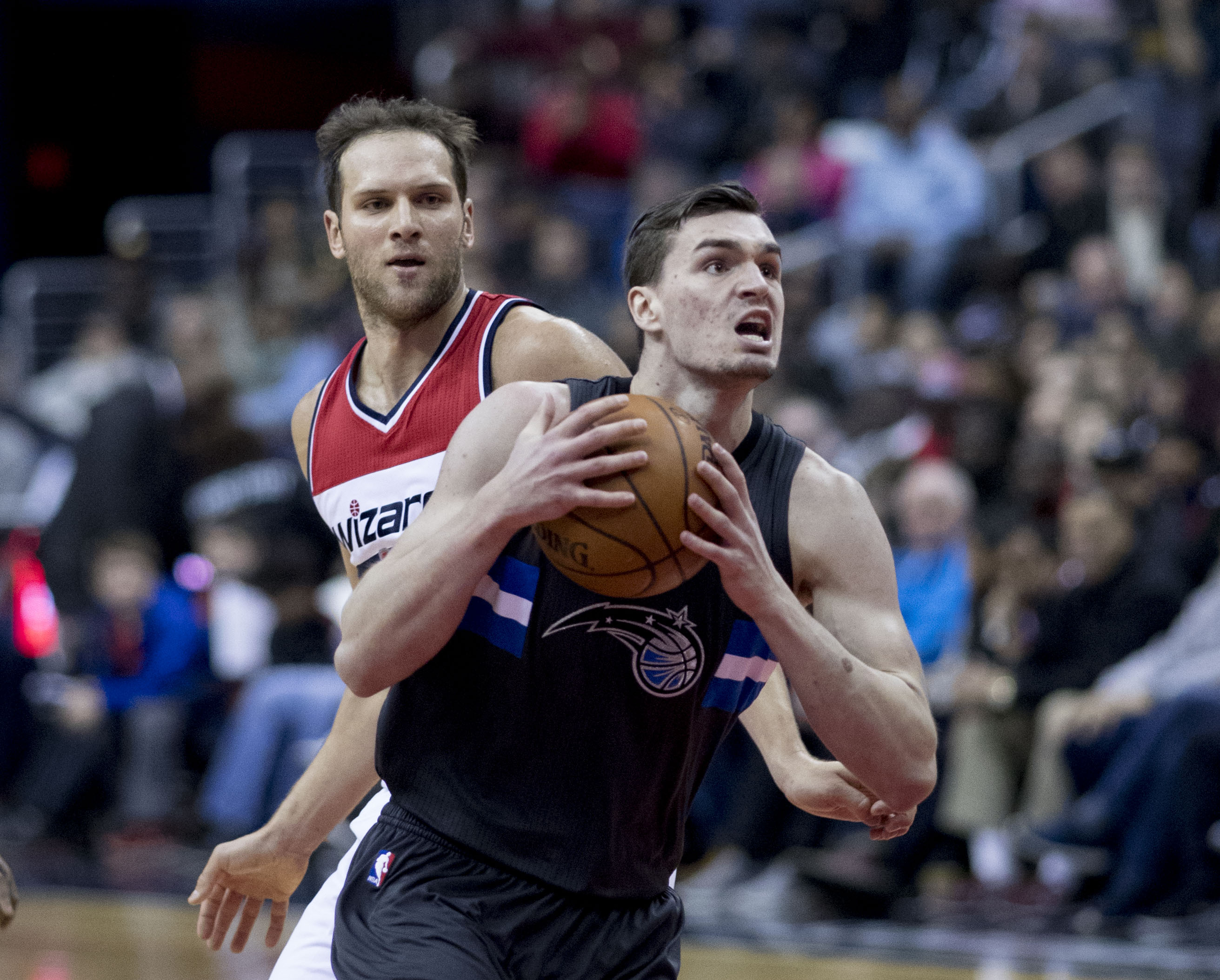
Hezonja with the Orlando Magic in 2017

Under new head coach Frank Vogel, Hezonja saw minutes reduction, mainly due to his mediocre defense. On 28 October 2016, Hezonja scored 13 points in a 108–82 loss to the Detroit Pistons. He tied that season high on 4 April 2017, registering another 13-point effort in a 122–102 loss to the Cleveland Cavaliers. In the Magic's season finale on 12 April 2017, Hezonja grabbed a career-high 11 rebounds in a 113–109 win over Detroit.

Although his defense improved towards the end of the season, his shooting numbers waned. In general, his sophomore season was underwhelming, and with reduced minutes his game averages dropped to just 4.9 points and 2.2 rebounds per game on 35.5 field goal percentage. The Magic finished the season with 29–53 record, missing the playoffs.

2017–18 season

On 31 October 2017, Hezonja's fourth-year option was not picked up by the Magic.

After seeing very little action in the beginning of the 2017–18 season, he made first start of the season against the Atlanta Hawks on 9 December and scored 7 points. On 13 December in a game against the Los Angeles Clippers, he scored a season-high 17 points and had nine rebounds, four assists and three blocks. On 17 December, Hezonja scored a then-career-high 28 points and had six rebounds and two assists, while shooting 8 from 12 from the three-point line, in a 114–110 loss to the Detroit Pistons.

=== New York Knicks (2018–2019) ===
On 6 July 2018, Hezonja signed a one-year, $6.5 million deal with the New York Knicks. On 17 March 2019, he made a game-winning block against LeBron James in a 124–123 win over the Los Angeles Lakers. Hezonja recorded 17 points, eight rebounds and two steals alongside the block. On 5 April, he recorded his first career triple-double, logging 16 points, 16 rebounds and eleven assists in a 96–120 loss to the Houston Rockets. Two days later, Hezonja scored a career-high 30 points, alongside six rebounds, five assists and two steals, in a 113–110 win over the Washington Wizards.

=== Portland Trail Blazers (2019–2020) ===
On 3 July 2019, Hezonja signed a two-year, $3.7 million deal with the Portland Trail Blazers.

On 20 November 2020, Hezonja was traded to the Memphis Grizzlies in a three-team trade involving Enes Kanter Freedom. On 11 December, the Grizzlies waived Hezonja.

=== Panathinaikos (2021) ===
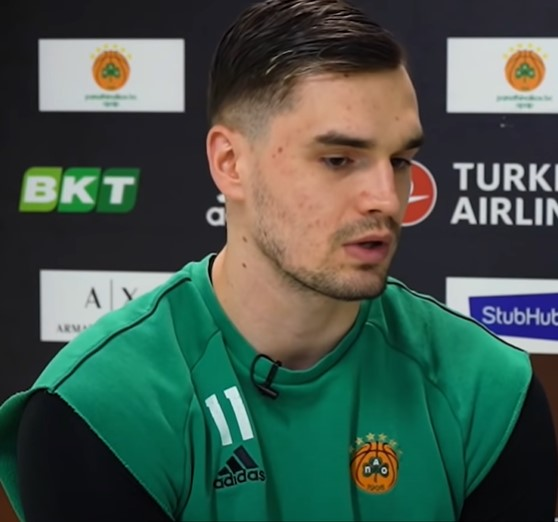
Hezonja with Panathinaikos in 2021

On 22 February 2021, Panathinaikos signed Hezonja for the remainder of 2020–21 season. There was an option on his contract for an additional year (until 30 June 2022), with a buy-out clause from FC Barcelona estimated around €400,000. Enes Kanter Freedom, Hezonja's Turkish teammate on the Portland Trail Blazers, allegedly played a vital part in his transfer to the Greek powerhouse, having also expressed his sympathies towards both Panathinaikos and the country of Greece in the past.

=== UNICS (2021–2022) ===
On 31 July 2021, Hezonja signed with the Russian team UNICS Kazan of the VTB United League, and of the EuroLeague until it was suspended due to the 2022 Russian invasion of Ukraine. On 26 January 2022, he was named a VTB United League All-Star, as part of the World Stars team.

=== Real Madrid (2022–2026) ===
On 21 July 2022, Hezonja joined reigning Spanish champions Real Madrid on a two-year deal. He won the EuroLeague in 2023 and was runner-up in 2024. On 2 July 2024, Hezonja signed a five-year contract extension with the Spanish powerhouse.

On 28 September 2024, Hezonja was sidelined for an unspecified amount of time after getting ill and losing weight as a result. On 2 October, he had resumed practices but was still questionable on returning to action.

On 1 June 2026, Hezonja was awarded the Spanish Liga MVP, having helped Madrid to the top of the standings after averaging 17.5 points, 4.9 rebounds, and 1.9 assists across 44 appearances.

=== Cleveland Cavaliers (2026–present) ===
On July 26, 2026, Hezonja signed a one–year, $2.85 million contract with the Cleveland Cavaliers, making his return to the NBA after a six-year absence.

== National team career ==
Hezonja was named Most Valuable Player of the 2011 FIBA Europe Under-16 Championship, after leading his team with a double-double in the final, 21 points, 10 rebounds and three steals. Over the tournament, he averaged 20 points, 8.2 rebounds and 2.7 assists. He was named to the All-Tournament Team of the 2012 FIBA Under-17 World Cup.

Hezonja was part of the senior Croatian national team that participated at the 2014 FIBA Basketball World Cup. He also represented Croatia at the EuroBasket 2015, where they were eliminated in the eighth finals by the Czech Republic. Over six tournament games, he averaged 6.7 points, 4.3 rebounds and 1.2 assists on 41.2% shooting from the field.

He represented Croatia at the 2016 Summer Olympics, where they finished in 5th place.

== Career statistics ==
Legend
GP	Games played	GS	Games started	MPG	Minutes per game
FG%	Field-goal percentage	3P%	3-point field-goal percentage	FT%	Free-throw percentage
RPG	Rebounds per game	APG	Assists per game	SPG	Steals per game
BPG	Blocks per game	PPG	Points per game	PIR	Performance index rating
**Bold**	Career high	†	Won a EuroLeague championship

=== NBA ===
==== Regular season ====
Year	Team	GP	GS	MPG	FG%	3P%	FT%	RPG	APG	SPG	BPG	PPG
2015–16	Orlando	**79**	9	17.9	.433	**.349**	**.907**	2.2	1.4	.5	.2	6.1
2016–17	Orlando	65	2	14.8	.355	.299	.800	2.2	1.0	.5	.2	4.9
2017–18	Orlando	75	**30**	**22.1**	**.442**	.337	.819	3.7	1.4	**1.1**	**.4**	**9.6**
2018–19	New York	58	24	20.8	.412	.276	.763	**4.1**	**1.5**	1.0	.1	8.8
2019–20	Portland	53	4	16.4	.422	.308	.814	3.5	.9	.7	.2	4.8
Career		330	69	18.5	.417	.319	.812	3.1	1.3	.7	.2	6.9

==== Playoffs ====
Year	Team	GP	GS	MPG	FG%	3P%	FT%	RPG	APG	SPG	BPG	PPG
2020	Portland	5	0	13.6	.409	.286	.750	3.2	1.2	.6	.0	4.6
Career		5	0	13.6	.409	.286	.750	3.2	1.2	.6	.0	4.6

=== EuroLeague ===
Year	Team	GP	GS	MPG	FG%	3P%	FT%	RPG	APG	SPG	BPG	PPG	PIR
2012–13	Barcelona	2	0	9.5	.333	—	.500	2.0	—	.5	—	2.5	1.5
2013–14	Barcelona	14	1	6.1	.429	.250	.750	.5	.2	—	—	1.6	0.9
2014–15	Barcelona	22	2	16.5	.462	.382	.750	2.0	1.0	.6	.2	7.7	6.1
2020–21	Panathinaikos	8	6	22.7	.415	.366	.842	2.5	1.3	**1.6**	**.4**	14.4	12.8
2021–22	UNICS	25	23	**29.6**	.447	.349	.778	**6.1**	1.8	1.2	.3	14.2	**14.3**
2022–23†	Real Madrid	39	12	20.5	.466	**.433**	.758	3.0	1.1	.7	.2	10.6	9.2
2023–24	Real Madrid	38	17	23.3	**.475**	.431	**.921**	4.6	.9	1.0	.1	13.5	13.3
2024–25	Real Madrid	38	17	27.1	.463	.315	.819	5.3	1.5	.8	.1	**14.9**	**14.3**
2025–26	Real Madrid	**44**	**36**	22.3	.426	.306	.805	4.0	**2.4**	.8	—	13.3	12.4
Career		230	114	22.1	.452	.364	.815	3.9	1.2	.8	.2	11.9	11.1

=== Domestic leagues ===
Year	Team	League	GP	MPG	FG%	3P%	FT%	RPG	APG	SPG	BPG	PPG
2012–13	(Spain) Barcelona B	LEB Oro	22	24.5	.426	.339	.784	3.4	1.4	1.9	.6	14.5
2012–13	(Spain) Barcelona	ACB	3	3.1	.500	.000	.000	.0	.0	.0	.0	.0
2013–14	(Spain) Barcelona	ACB	19	12.2	.458	.395	.889	2.4	1.1	.4	.2	5.3
2014–15	(Spain) Barcelona	ACB	41	14.2	.456	.380	.667	2.0	1.2	.7	.1	4.7
2020–21	(Greece) Panathinaikos	GBL	18	19.7	.417	.333	.880	3.3	1.7	.8	.2	10.7
2021–22	(Russia) UNICS	VTBUL	21	31.9	.485	.235	.812	7.4	3.5	1.9	.3	18.8
2022–23	(Spain) Real Madrid	ACB	37	20.3	.472	.365	.826	4.3	1.3	.9	.2	10.1
2023–24	(Spain) Real Madrid	ACB	27	22.0	.429	.342	.880	4.4	1.4	.8	.1	10.6
2024–25	(Spain) Real Madrid	ACB	40	24.5	.454	.386	.837	5.0	1.2	1.1	.1	14.1
2025–26	(Spain) Real Madrid	ACB	31	23.9	.477	.366	.890	4.9	1.9	.9	.1	17.5

== Career achievement and honors ==
=== Club honors ===
Junior club honors

- Nike International Junior Tournament (2011)
- Ciutat de L'Hospitalet Tournament (2013)

Senior club honors

- Spanish League champion (2014)
- Greek League champion (2021)
- Greek Cup winner (2021)

=== Individual ===
- 2011 FIBA Europe Under-16 Championship: MVP
- 2011 Nike International Junior Tournament: All-Tournament Team
- Sportske novosti award for Fair Play (2011)
- 2012 FIBA Under-17 World Cup: All-Tournament Team
- 2013 Torneo de L'Hospitalet: All-Tournament Team
- LEB Oro Rising Star (2013)

== Personal life ==
Hezonja's uncle died fighting for the Croatian Army during the Croatian War of Independence.

== See also ==
- List of European basketball players in the United States
