= ACB Most Valuable Player =

Spanish basketball award

ACB Most Valuable Player is an annual award of the Liga ACB, the top-tier professional basketball league in Spain. The ACB handed out the award first after the 1991–92 ACB season. Since then, seven players have won the award more than once: Darryl Middleton (3-time winner), Arvydas Sabonis, Tanoka Beard, Luis Scola, Felipe Reyes, Nikola Mirotić, and Giorgi Shermadini (2-time winners). Additionally, only six Spanish players have won the award: Juan Carlos Navarro, Marc Gasol, Felipe Reyes, Fernando San Emeterio, Sergio Llull and naturalized Spanish player Nikola Mirotić. The winner of the award is determined by voting by coaches, players, fans (through online voting), and the media.

== All-time award winners ==
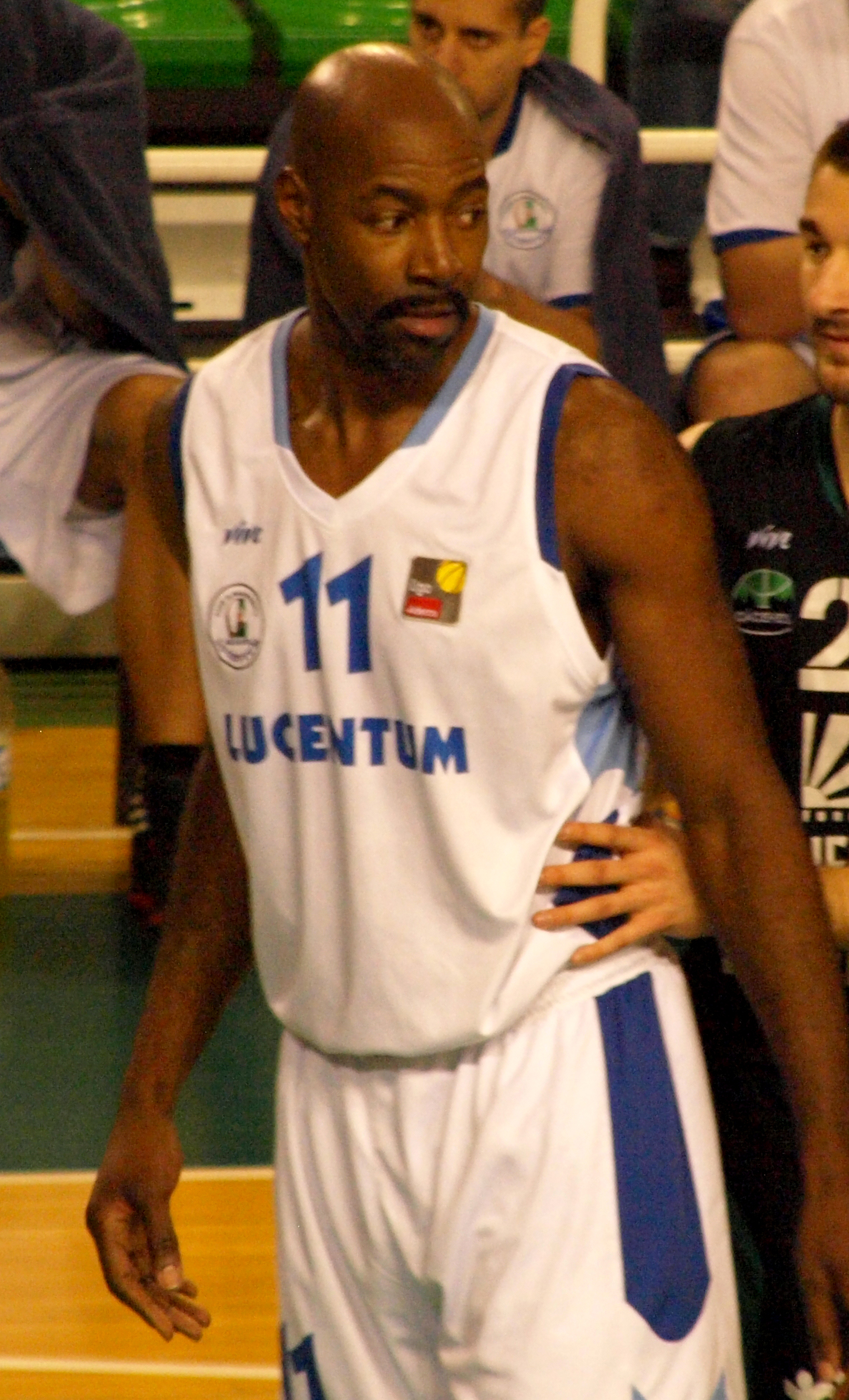
Darryl Middleton was a three-time Liga ACB MVP (1992, 1993, 2000)

Arvydas Sabonis was a two time Liga ACB MVP, in 1994 and 1995

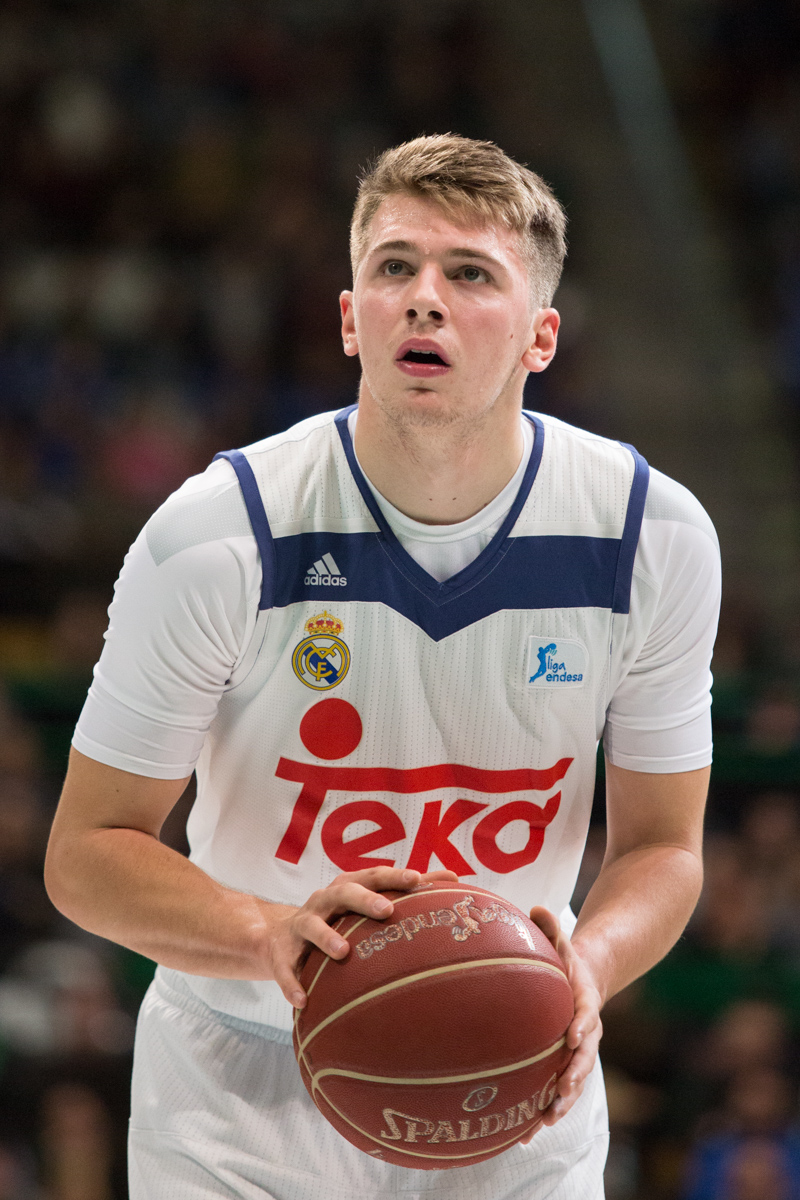
Luka Dončić was the youngest player ever to win the award, at age 19

^	Denotes player who is still active in the Liga ACB
*	Inducted into the Naismith Memorial Basketball Hall of Fame
†	Denotes player whose team won championship that year
Player (X)	Denotes the number of times the player had been named MVP at that time
Team (X)	Denotes the number of times a player from this team had won at that time

Season	Player	Position	Nationality	Team
1991–92	Darryl Middleton	Forward	United States	Valvi Girona
1992–93	Darryl Middleton (2)	Forward	United States	Caja San Fernando
1993–94†	Arvydas Sabonis*	Center	Lithuania	Real Madrid
1994–95	Arvydas Sabonis* (2)	Center	Lithuania	Real Madrid
1995–96	Michael Anderson	Guard	United States	Caja San Fernando
1996–97	Kenny Green	Forward/center	United States	Taugrés Baskonia
1997–98	Dejan Bodiroga	Forward	FR Yugoslavia (Note: Since the breakup of FR Yugoslavia, later known as Serbia and Montenegro, Bodiroga has held Serbian nationality.)	Real Madrid
1998–99	Tanoka Beard	Forward/center	United States	Real Madrid
1999–00	Darryl Middleton (3)	Forward	United States	Casademont Girona
2000–01	Lou Roe	Forward	United States	Gijón Baloncesto
2001–02	Tanoka Beard (2)	Forward/center	United States	DKV Joventut
2002–03	Walter Herrmann	Forward	Argentina	Jabones Pardo Fuenlabrada
2003–04	Andrés Nocioni	Forward	Argentina	TAU Cerámica Baskonia
2004–05	Luis Scola	Forward	Argentina	TAU Cerámica Baskonia
2005–06	Juan Carlos Navarro	Guard	Spain	FC Barcelona
2006–07	Luis Scola (2)	Forward	Argentina	TAU Cerámica Baskonia
2007–08	Marc Gasol	Center	Spain	Akasvayu Girona
2008–09	Felipe Reyes	Forward	Spain	Real Madrid
2009–10†	Tiago Splitter	Center	Brazil	Caja Laboral Baskonia
2010–11	Fernando San Emeterio^	Forward	Spain	Caja Laboral Baskonia
2011–12	Andy Panko	Forward	United States	Lagun Aro GBC
2012–13†	Nikola Mirotić	Forward	Spain (Note: Mirotić, born in Titograd (now Podgorica), also holds Montenegrin nationality. He represents Spain in international competitions.)	Real Madrid
2013–14	Justin Doellman^	Forward	United States (Note: Born an American citizen, Doellman gained Kosovar citizenship in 2017, and represents that country in international competitions.)	Valencia
2014–15†	Felipe Reyes (2)	Forward	Spain	Real Madrid
2015–16	Ioannis Bourousis	Center	Greece	Laboral Kutxa Baskonia
2016–17	Sergio Llull^	Guard	Spain	Real Madrid
2017–18†	Luka Dončić	Guard	Slovenia	Real Madrid
2018–19	Nicolás Laprovíttola^	Guard	Argentina	Divina Seguros Joventut
2019–20	Nikola Mirotić (2)	Forward	Spain	FC Barcelona
2020–21	Giorgi Shermadini^	Center	Georgia	Lenovo Tenerife
2021–22	Džanan Musa	Forward	Bosnia and Herzegovina	Río Breogán
2022–23	Giorgi Shermadini^ (2)	Center	Georgia	Lenovo Tenerife
2023–24	Facundo Campazzo^	Guard	Argentina	Real Madrid
2024–25	Marcelinho Huertas^	Guard	Brazil	La Laguna Tenerife
2025–26	Mario Hezonja^	Forward	Croatia	Real Madrid

== Players with most awards ==
Player	Editions	Notes
(United States) (Spain) Darryl Middleton	3	1992, 1993, 2000
(Lithuania) Arvydas Sabonis	2	1994, 1995
(Argentina) Luis Scola	2	2005, 2007
(Montenegro) (Spain) Nikola Mirotić	2	2013, 2020
(Spain) Felipe Reyes	2	2009, 2015
(United States) Tanoka Beard	2	1999, 2002
(Georgia (country)) Giorgi Shermadini	2	2021, 2023

== Awards won by club ==
Country	Total
Real Madrid	11
Baskonia	7
Girona	3
Tenerife	3
Real Betis	2
Joventut Badalona	2
FC Barcelona	2
Gijon	1
Fuenlabrada	1
Gipuzkoa Basket	1
Valencia	1
Breogán	1

== Awards won by nationality ==
Country	Total
United States	10
Spain	8
Argentina	6
Brazil	2
Georgia	2
Lithuania	2
Bosnia and Herzegovina	1
Croatia	1
Greece	1
Slovenia	1

== See also ==
- ACB Finals Most Valuable Player Award
- All-ACB Team
- ACB Rising Star Award
