= Andrés Nocioni =

Argentine basketball player (born 1979)

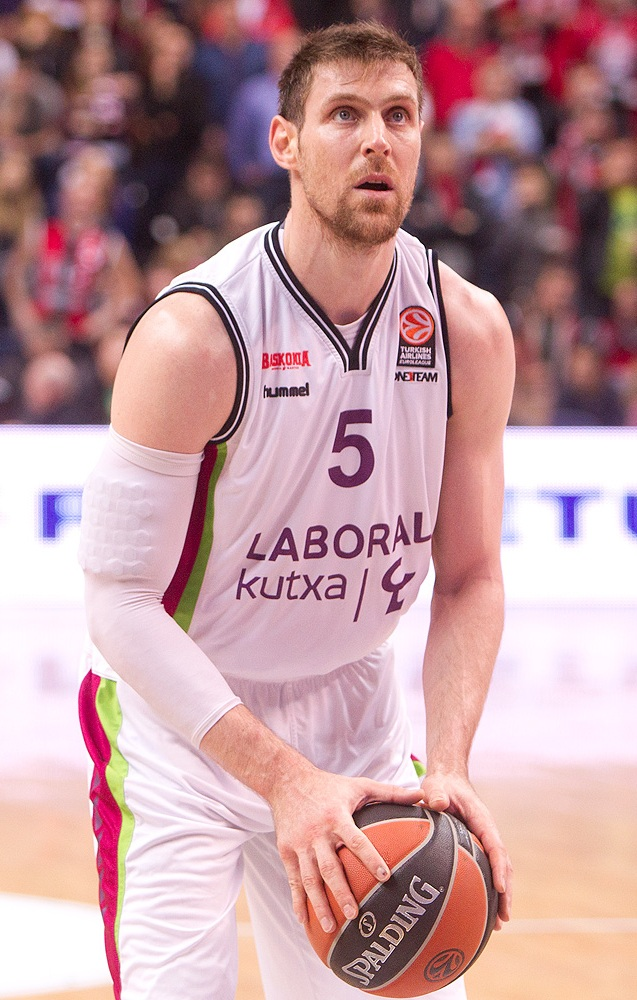
- Nocioni with Baskonia in 2013

Personal information
- Born: 30 November 1979 (age 46) Santa Fe, Argentina
- Listed height: 6 ft 8 in (2.03 m)
- Listed weight: 225 lb (102 kg)

Career information
- NBA draft: 2001: undrafted
- Playing career: 1996–2017
- Position: Small forward / power forward
- Number: 5, 6, 13

Career history
- 1995–1996: Racing Club de Avellaneda
- 1996–1997: Olimpia Venado Tuerto
- 1997–1999: Independiente de General Pico
- 1999–2000: Baskonia
- 2000–2001: Manresa
- 2001–2004: Baskonia
- 2004–2009: Chicago Bulls
- 2009–2010: Sacramento Kings
- 2010–2012: Philadelphia 76ers
- 2011: Peñarol de Mar del Plata
- 2012–2014: Baskonia
- 2014–2017: Real Madrid

Career highlights
- FIBA Intercontinental Cup champion (2015); EuroLeague champion (2015); EuroLeague Final Four MVP (2015); 2× All-EuroLeague Second Team (2003, 2004); 3× Liga ACB champion (2002, 2015, 2016); 5× Spanish Cup winner (2002, 2004, 2015–2017); Spanish Supercup winner (2014); Liga ACB MVP (2004); 2× All-Liga ACB First Team (2004, 2013); No. 13 retired by the Argentine Basketball Confederation
- Stats at NBA.com
- Stats at Basketball Reference
Medals
Men's basketball
Representing Argentina
Olympic Games
Gold medal – first place	2004 Athens
Bronze medal – third place	2008 Beijing
FIBA World Cup
Silver medal – second place	2002 Indianapolis
FIBA Diamond Ball
Bronze medal – third place	2004 Belgrade
Gold medal – first place	2008 Nanjing
FIBA AmeriCup
Bronze medal – third place	1999 San Juan
Gold medal – first place	2001 Neuquén
Silver medal – second place	2003 San Juan
Gold medal – first place	2011 Mar del Plata
Silver medal – second place	2015 Mexico City
FIBA South American Championship
Silver medal – second place	1999 Bahía Blanca
Gold medal – first place	2001 Valdivia

Andrés Marcelo Nocioni (born 30 November 1979) is an Argentine former professional basketball player. He was a two-time All-EuroLeague selection before spending eight seasons in the National Basketball Association (NBA), from 2004 to 2012. Nocioni won a EuroLeague title in 2015, earning the EuroLeague Final Four MVP Award in the process.

Nocioni was a member of Argentina's gold medal-winning team at the 2004 Summer Olympics in Athens, as well as the Argentina squads that won the bronze medal at the 2008 Summer Olympics and the silver medal at the 2002 FIBA World Championship in Indianapolis. In 2010 he won the Konex Award as one of the five best Basketball Players from the last decade in Argentina. His jersey number 13 was retired by the Argentinian Basketball Confederation.

== Personal life ==
Andrés was the second son of Pedro José "Pilo" Nocioni and Ángela Palmira Roux, both siblings born in Santa Fe although the family lived in Gálvez, 80 km south of Santa Fe, where Andrés attended school. Andrés and his wife, fellow Argentine Paula Raquel Aimonetto, have two sons, Laureano and Benicio. Nocioni is known as "Chapu" after the children's TV series El Chapulín Colorado, which was very popular in Argentina. He holds Argentine and Italian citizenships.

== Professional career ==
=== Argentina and Spain ===
Nocioni's professional career began in the Argentine basketball league (LNB) in the 1995–96 season in Racing Club de Avellaneda, and in 1998–99 he was already named Best Sixth Man. In 2001, Nocioni went to Vitoria-Gasteiz, where he spent three seasons as a refuerzo (reinforcement player) with Spain's TAU Cerámica of the top-tier level ACB Spanish professional league. He was the league's 2004 Most Valuable Player, and his stellar play earned him an All-EuroLeague Second Team selection in 2003 and 2004.

=== Chicago Bulls ===
After winning the gold medal at the 2004 Olympics, Nocioni was signed as an undrafted rookie free-agent by the Chicago Bulls. Two of his countrymen, Manu Ginóbili and Carlos Delfino, were also in the NBA at the time.

He played in 81 games during his rookie season and posted averages of 8.3 ppg, 4.8 rpg, 1.5 apg and 23.4 mpg. Nocioni's physical style of defense created controversy around the league, and he was suspended for one game after a hard foul to Detroit Pistons' Tayshaun Prince. Nocioni had previously committed a hard foul on the Miami Heat's Dwyane Wade and then was shoved past photographers and into the first row of spectators by Udonis Haslem. A spectator tossed a drink at Nocioni, which was similar to the incident that triggered Pacers–Pistons brawl at The Palace of Auburn Hills. The fan was ejected by security. For the incident, Nocioni received a flagrant-one foul (which is a foul involving excessive or unjustified contact) and a technical. Haslem received a technical and an ejection.

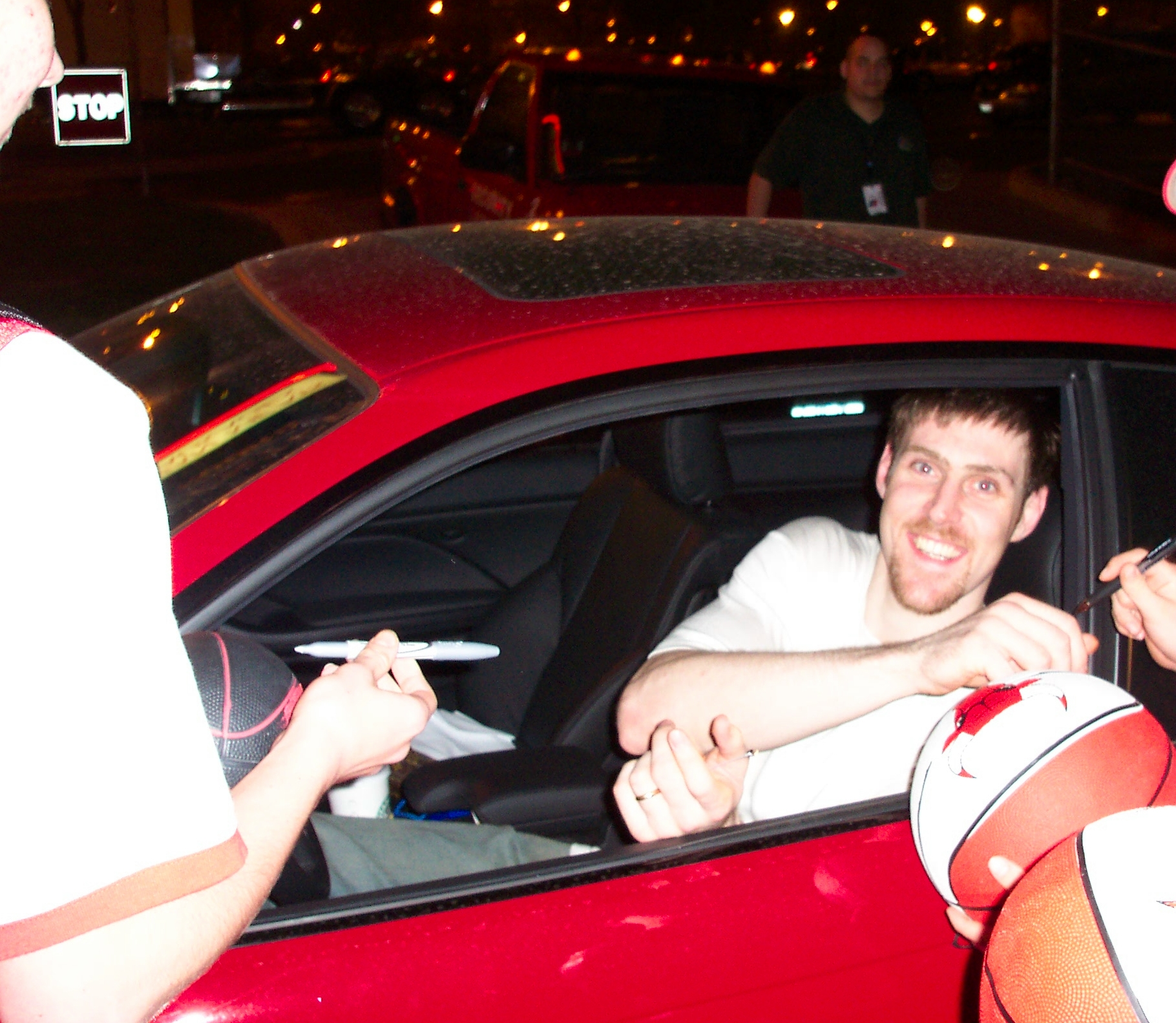
Andrés Nocioni signing basketballs for fans during his tenure as a Chicago Bull player

While giving a teleconference interview with NBA.com, Nocioni spoke about the hard fouls and his suspension, "First, the one with Wade was completely my fault. It was a bad reaction on my part. If I had received any penalties because of it, it would be a fair sanction, but it was not given. However, the sanction set after the game against the Pistons is totally unfair. I see it as a totally real play taken out of context in the game — absolutely nothing happened. It was an accidental blow. Without purposely trying to, I hit him. I apologized on the court. I also asked Carlos Delfino to give my apologies to him, so I don't understand why there is a sanction for something totally normal in a game." In Nocioni's first NBA playoff game, he scored 25 points and grabbed 18 rebounds while playing all 48 minutes. Due to his outstanding play, the sold-out United Center crowd in Chicago chanted his name. This game solidified Nocioni's status as a Chicago favorite.

In Nocioni's second season with the Chicago Bulls, he averaged 13.0 ppg, 6.1 rpg, and 1.4 apg, while playing in all 82 games, 43 of them starts. Nocioni was named the Chicago Bulls' Player of the Year for the 2005–06 season. In the playoffs Nocioni averaged 22.8 points, 9.6 rebounds, 1.6 assists including two double-doubles. In game two against the Miami Heat he scored 30 points shooting 13–15 overall from the field (83.3%), including 3–3 in from the three-point line and 1–1 in free throws, with 6 rebounds and one steal in almost 40 minutes played. Nocioni scored 30 points again on November 19, during the 82–72 defeat against the L.A. Lakers. He also scored a career high 31 points and grabbed 13 rebounds in the December 1st 111–108 road victory against the Hornets. Nocioni missed a third of the 2006–07 NBA season due to plantar fasciitis. He returned to action late in the season on April 8, 2007, against Toronto.

Nocioni became a restricted free-agent following the 2006–07 season. On July 6, 2007, he agreed a 5-year deal with the Chicago Bulls worth a reported $38 million. Teams that were interested in Nocioni included the Memphis Grizzlies. The deal became official on July 18, 2007. In preparation for the 2008–09 NBA season, Nocioni admitted the knee tendinitis which had hampered his performance during the 2008 Olympics was still affecting him and specifically he had hardly done anything in between winning the bronze medal and reporting for training camp.

=== Sacramento Kings ===
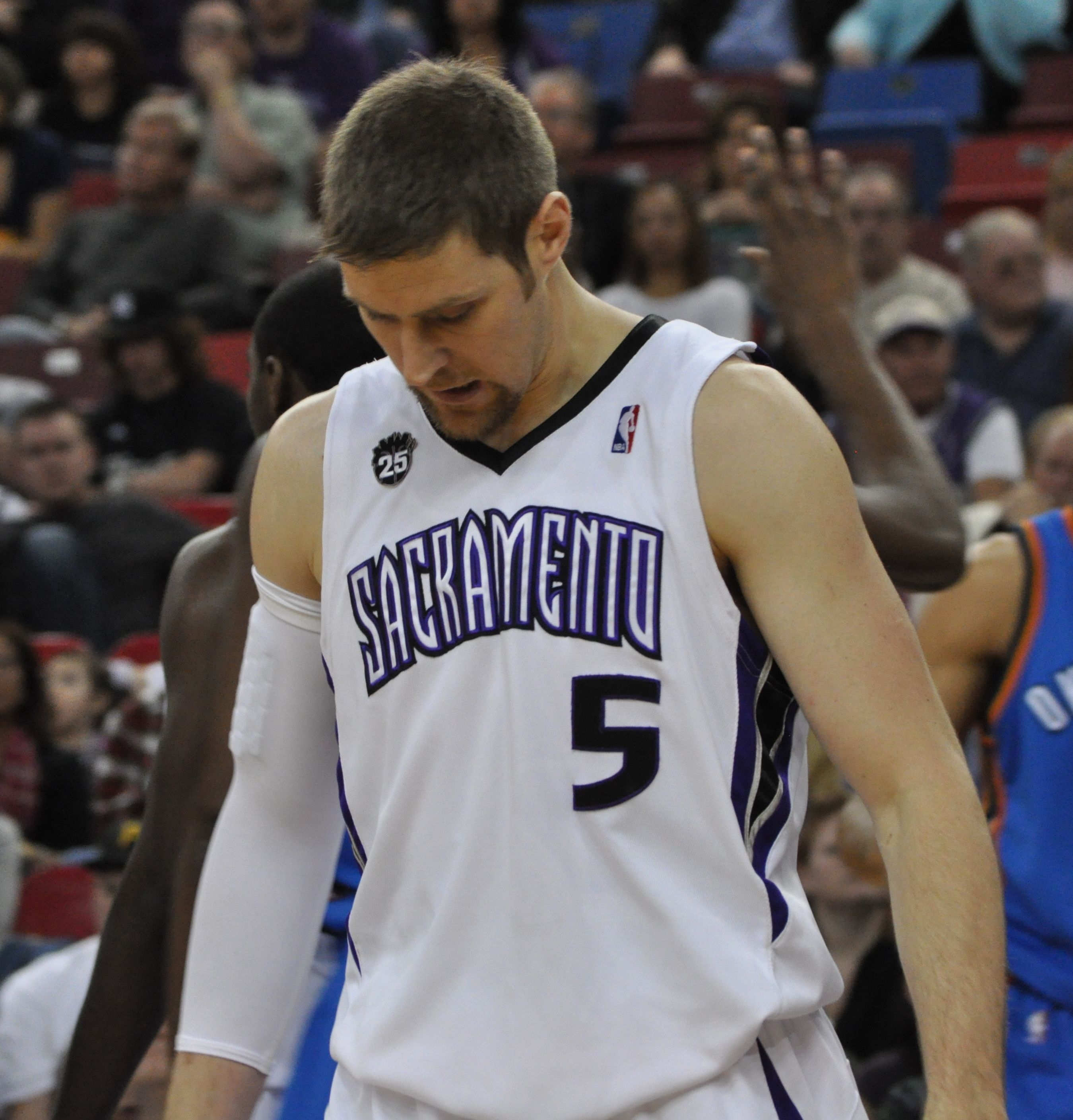
Nocioni with the Sacramento Kings in 2010

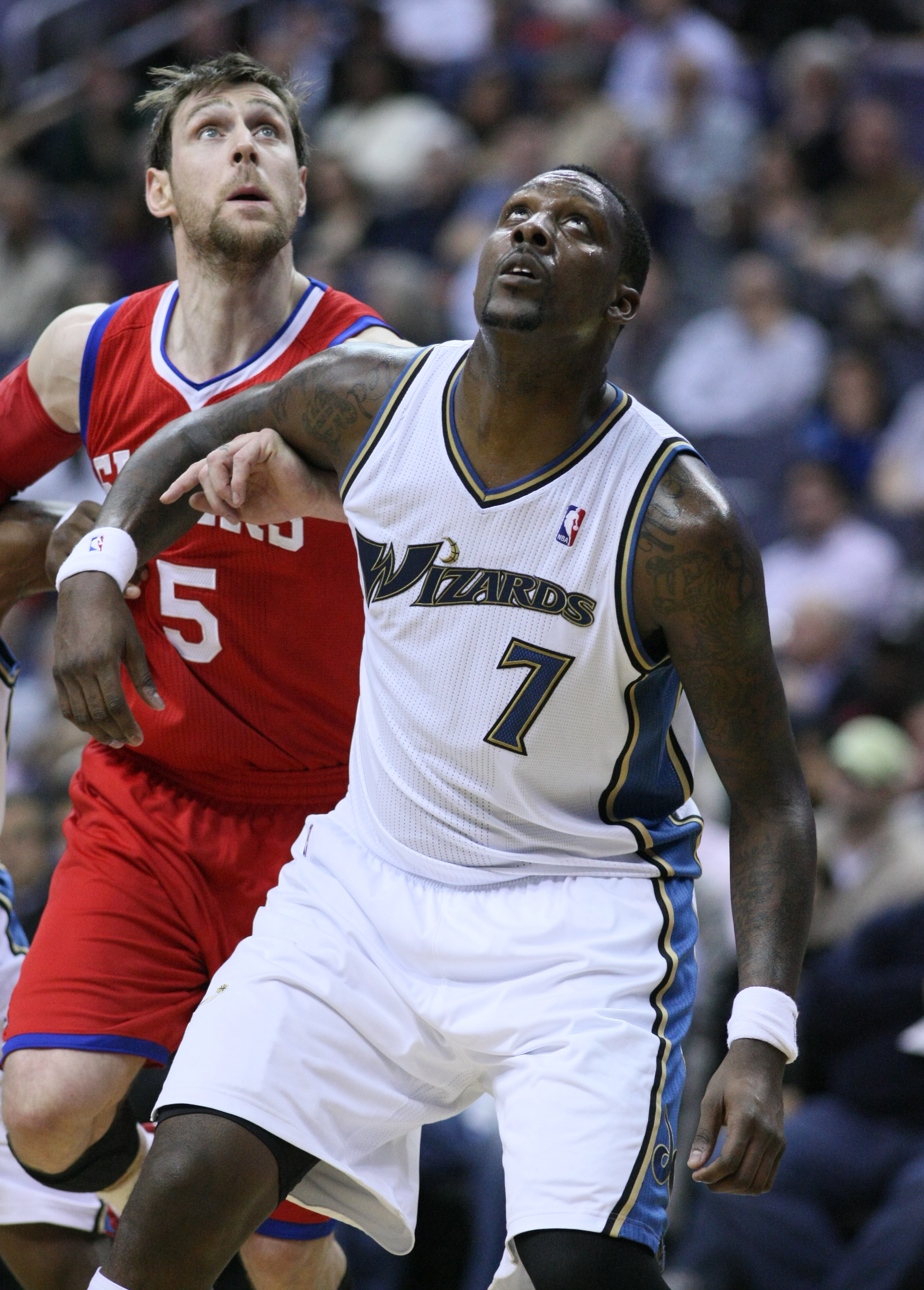
Nocioni (#5) with the 76ers fighting Andray Blatche for position

On February 18, 2009, Nocioni was traded to the Sacramento Kings along with Drew Gooden and Cedric Simmons for John Salmons and Brad Miller. Nocioni started for the Kings the last 23 games of the 2008–09 season, averaging 13.7 points a game. Sacramento was in a rebuilding process however, and Nocioni requested a trade following a decrease in playing time.

=== Philadelphia 76ers ===
After the season ended, on June 17, 2010, Nocioni was traded to the Philadelphia 76ers along with Spencer Hawes for Samuel Dalembert. On December 29, 2010, he scored a season-high 22 points to go along with 12 rebounds, in a 123–110 win over the Phoenix Suns.

=== Return to Argentina ===
During the 2011 NBA lockout, Nocioni trained with Peñarol de Mar del Plata while waiting for the situation to resolve itself. With the announcement of the NBPA to dissolve the Union and start litigation against the NBA, he agreed to join the team for the Súper 8 tournament in November 2011. On November 26, as the NBA announced that a tentative agreement on a new collective bargaining agreement was reached, Nocioni helped Peñarol to its third Súper 8 tournament.

=== Return to Spain ===
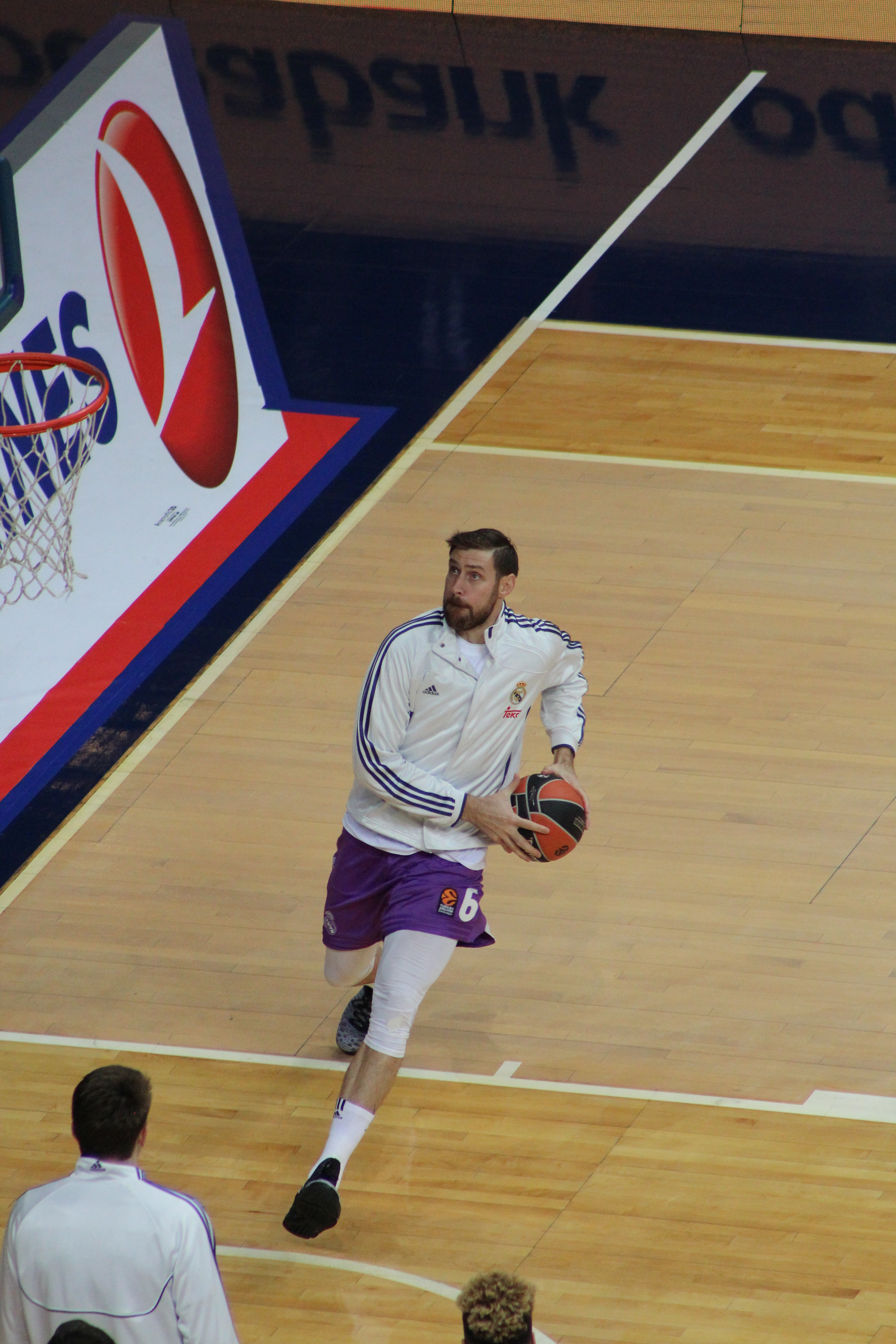
Nocioni warming up with Real Madrid in 2016

With the end of the lockout, Nocioni returned to the Philadelphia 76ers for the 2011–12 NBA season, but was waived in March 2012, after playing 11 games that season.

Nocioni's final NBA game was played on March 12, 2012, in a 103–71 win over the Boston Celtics where he recorded 1 point and no other stats in 3 and half minutes of playing time.

He then signed with his former team, Caja Laboral (formerly known as TAU Cerámica for sponsorship reasons), for the remainder of the season. He chose to wear number 55, as number 5, was already taken by his Argentina national basketball team teammate Pablo Prigioni. He re-signed with Caja Laboral in July 2012.

On July 20, 2014, he parted ways with Baskonia, and he signed a two-year contract with Real Madrid, five days later. In May 2015, Real Madrid won the EuroLeague, after defeating Olympiacos, by a score of 78–59 in the final game. Nocioni was named the Final Four MVP. Real Madrid eventually finished the season winning the Spanish League championship, after a 3–0 series sweep in the Spanish League finals series against Barcelona. With that trophy, Real Madrid won the triple crown.

On July 21, 2016, Nocioni re-signed with Real Madrid. On April 3, 2017, he announced his intentions to retire after the 2016–17 season.

== National team career ==
Nocioni was called up to defend Argentina and won the silver medal at the 1999 South American Championship. In 2001, Nocioni defended Argentina and won the gold medal at the South American Championship. and at the 2001 FIBA Americas Championship. In 2002, Nocioni defended Argentina with distinction and making basketball history. Argentina would beat the United States team, the first team to do so after NBA players were allowed to compete at the 2002 FIBA World Championship, in Indianapolis, U.S. The championship would go in the finals to Yugoslavia, Argentina brought home a silver medal.

In 2004, Nocioni was a key factor when Argentina became the first Latin American team (and the fourth team ever, after the USA, Yugoslavia, and the USSR) in Olympic basketball history, to win the Olympic gold medal.

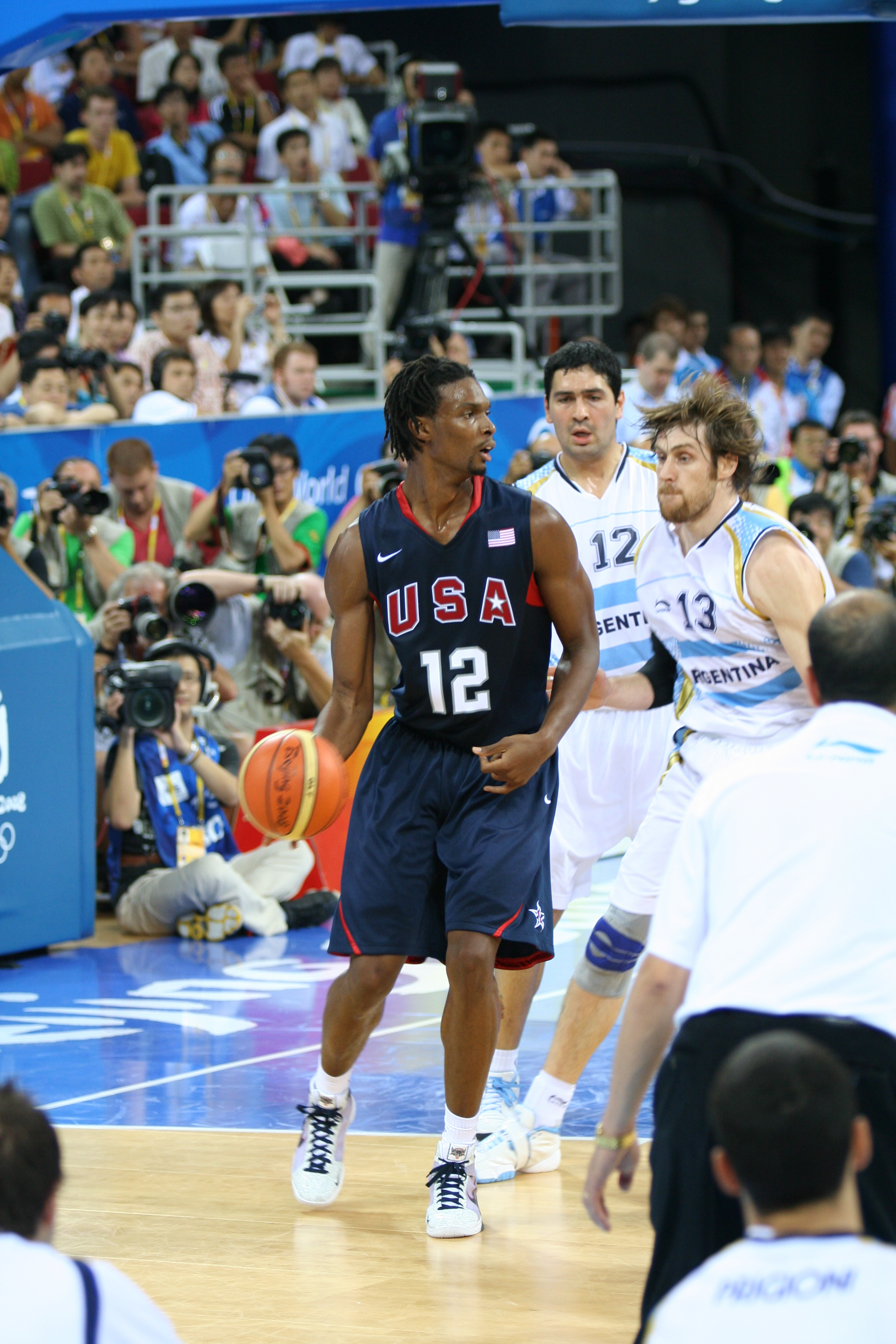
Nocioni (#13) defending Chris Bosh, USA v Argentina in August 2008

In 2006, Nocioni started for Argentina at the 2006 FIBA World Championship. In a game against Venezuela, he landed on an opponent's foot, and it looked he injured his ankle, though he was cleared to play in Argentina's next game against Nigeria. In Argentina's game against Nigeria, Nocioni led the team in scoring, with 23 points, playing 18 minutes, while not missing a single shot. Nocioni was 9–9 from the field, including 5–5 from the 3-point line. "I don't think I've ever played a game where I didn't miss a shot - at least not for the national team." Argentina won group A of the tournament, going a perfect 5–0 in the first round of play.

Argentina lost to Spain in the 2006 FIBA World Championship semifinal, with a final score of 75–74. Nocioni had a chance to win the game for Argentina, but his three-pointer at the end of the game missed, giving Spain the win, and the chance to win the championship. Nocioni's Argentine team next played the US team in the bronze medal game, which Argentina lost 96–81. Nocioni scored 18 points in this game, in which he played against NBA teammate Kirk Hinrich.

In 2008, Nocioni was selected to play with Argentina in the Beijing Summer Olympics. Argentina advanced to the quarter-final with four wins, placing behind Lithuania in the group stage, after defeating Russia. In the game against Russia, Nocioni hit 4 three-pointers, finishing with 19 points. After defeating Greece in the quarterfinals, the Argentine team lost their Olympic semifinals rematch from 4 years earlier against the US team. Due to knee tendinitis, Nocioni only played 18 minutes, scoring 10 points, and securing 4 rebounds. Argentina next played Lithuania, in the bronze medal match, which Argentina won 87–75. Nocioni scored 14 points in that game.

In 2011, he was a part of the team that won the gold medal in the 2011 FIBA Americas Championship, that was played in Mar del Plata. He also played at the 2012 Summer Olympics, the 2014 FIBA World Cup, and the 2015 FIBA Americas Championship, where he won a silver medal, and was named to the All-Tournament Team. He finished his national team career by playing at the 2016 Summer Olympics.

On February 26, 2018, the Argentine Basketball Confederation retired the #13 jersey worn by Nocioni during his career with the national team. The ceremony was held in the Parque Carlos Guerrero stadium of Olavarría during the Argentina v. Paraguay match for the 2019 World Cup qualification.

Nocioni was also appointed as collaborator of the Argentina coaching staff.

== Career statistics ==
Legend
GP	Games played	GS	Games started	MPG	Minutes per game
FG%	Field-goal percentage	3P%	3-point field-goal percentage	FT%	Free-throw percentage
RPG	Rebounds per game	APG	Assists per game	SPG	Steals per game
BPG	Blocks per game	PPG	Points per game	PIR	Performance index rating
**Bold**	Career high

=== NBA ===
*	Led the league

==== Regular season ====
Year	Team	GP	GS	MPG	FG%	3P%	FT%	RPG	APG	SPG	BPG	PPG
2004–05	Chicago	81	38	23.4	.401	.258	.766	4.8	1.5	.5	.4	8.4
2005–06	Chicago	**82***	**43**	27.3	.461	.391	.843	**6.1**	1.4	.5	.6	13.0
2006–07	Chicago	53	31	26.5	**.467**	.383	**.848**	5.7	1.1	.5	.5	**14.1**
2007–08	Chicago	**82***	27	24.6	.432	.364	.807	4.2	1.2	.3	.5	13.2
2008–09	Chicago	53	2	24.1	.414	.378	.806	4.2	1.1	.5	.3	10.4
2008–09	Sacramento	23	16	**31.0**	.448	**.441**	.763	6.0	**1.8**	**.6**	**.7**	13.7
2009–10	Sacramento	78	28	19.7	.399	.386	.717	3.0	1.0	.4	.3	8.5
2010–11	Philadelphia	54	17	17.2	.426	.356	.803	3.1	.8	.3	.3	6.1
2011–12	Philadelphia	11	1	5.1	.250	.167	.545	1.3	.1	.1	.1	1.5
Career		514	203	23.4	.431	.373	.799	4.5	1.2	.4	.4	10.5

==== Playoffs ====
Year	Team	GP	GS	MPG	FG%	3P%	FT%	RPG	APG	SPG	BPG	PPG
2005	Chicago	6	**6**	33.7	.403	.353	.739	8.2	**2.3**	.2	**1.0**	12.8
2006	Chicago	6	**6**	**38.3**	**.560**	**.476**	**.857**	**8.8**	1.5	**.8**	.3	**22.3**
2007	Chicago	**10**	0	19.7	.360	.333	.722	3.5	.8	.2	.5	8.8
2011	Philadelphia	1	0	10.0	.000	.000	.000	2.0	.0	.0	.0	.0
Career		23	12	27.7	.438	.367	.789	6.0	1.3	.3	.6	13.0

=== EuroLeague ===
†	Denotes seasons in which Nocioni won the EuroLeague

Year	Team	GP	GS	MPG	FG%	3P%	FT%	RPG	APG	SPG	BPG	PPG	PIR
2001–02	Baskonia	20	9	20.5	.508	.421	.778	3.8	.9	**1.3**	.6	9.1	9.7
2002–03	Baskonia	19	11	**29.0**	**.520**	**.437**	.697	**7.6**	1.3	.8	1.0	**16.8**	**18.0**
2003–04	Baskonia	16	13	25.8	.479	.377	.759	5.8	1.5	.9	.9	13.8	14.6
2012–13	Baskonia	28	**21**	23.5	.436	.337	.767	4.0	.8	.5	.6	10.9	9.9
2013–14	Baskonia	21	15	26.3	.454	.349	.789	6.6	**1.7**	.8	**1.2**	13.6	16.2
2014–15†	Real Madrid	**29**	8	17.7	.461	.374	**.796**	3.9	.5	.2	.3	8.7	7.8
2015–16	Real Madrid	24	1	13.9	.383	.374	.771	2.8	.2	.1	.5	5.8	5.0
2016–17	Real Madrid	15	0	6.4	.375	.269	.600	.8	.3	.1	.0	2.4	.3
Career		172	78	20.5	.461	.366	.760	4.4	.8	.6	.6	10.1	10.1
