= 2015 ACB Finals =

2015 ACB finals
Team	Coach	Wins
Real Madrid	Pablo Laso	3
FC Barcelona	Xavier Pascual	0
- Dates: June 19–24, 2015
- MVP: (Spain) Sergio Llull

The 2015 ACB Finals was the championship series of the 2014–15 season of the Liga ACB and the conclusion of the season's playoffs. Real Madrid defeated FC Barcelona in three games (3–0) for the Madrid' seventeenth ACB title and their thirty-second league in team history. Madrid's Sergio Llull was named the Finals Most Valuable Player (MVP).

The Finals was played in the 2–2–1 format (Games 1, 2, and 5 at Madrid, Games 3, and 4, at Barcelona). The series began on June 19, 2015 and ended on June 24, 2015, and was televised in Spain on La 1 and in Catalonia on TV3.

== Background ==
=== Road to the Finals ===
Real Madrid		FC Barcelona
Pos / Team / Pld / W / L / PF / PA / PD; 1 / Real Madrid / 34 / 27 / 7 / 2903 / 2640 / +263; 2 / FC Barcelona / 34 / 25 / 9 / 2806 / 2455 / +351; 3 / Unicaja / 34 / 25 / 9 / 2644 / 2490 / +154; 4 / Dominion Bilbao Basket / 34 / 20 / 14 / 2559 / 2514 / +45; 5 / Valencia Basket / 34 / 20 / 14 / 2817 / 2675 / +142; 6 / Laboral Kutxa Baskonia / 34 / 19 / 15 / 2834 / 2669 / +165; 7 / FIATC Joventut / 34 / 19 / 15 / 2652 / 2624 / +28; 8 / Herbalife Gran Canaria / 34 / 18 / 16 / 2638 / 2636 / +2; 9 / CAI Zaragoza / 34 / 18 / 16 / 2512 / 2578 / −66; 10 / UCAM Murcia / 34 / 17 / 17 / 2621 / 2660 / −39; 11 / Iberostar Tenerife / 34 / 16 / 18 / 2651 / 2619 / +32; 12 / Río Natura Monbús Obradoiro / 34 / 15 / 19 / 2467 / 2535 / −68; 13 / Movistar Estudiantes / 34 / 14 / 20 / 2509 / 2615 / −106; 14 / MoraBanc Andorra / 34 / 12 / 22 / 2549 / 2615 / −66; 15 / Baloncesto Sevilla / 34 / 12 / 22 / 2462 / 2673 / −211; 16 / La Bruixa d'Or Manresa / 34 / 11 / 23 / 2456 / 2672 / −216; 17 / Gipuzkoa Basket / 34 / 10 / 24 / 2409 / 2648 / −239; 18 / Montakit Fuenlabrada / 34 / 8 / 26 / 2533 / 2718 / −185; Source: ACB Best league record	Regular season	Pos / Team / Pld / W / L / PF / PA / PD; 1 / Real Madrid / 34 / 27 / 7 / 2903 / 2640 / +263; 2 / FC Barcelona / 34 / 25 / 9 / 2806 / 2455 / +351; 3 / Unicaja / 34 / 25 / 9 / 2644 / 2490 / +154; 4 / Dominion Bilbao Basket / 34 / 20 / 14 / 2559 / 2514 / +45; 5 / Valencia Basket / 34 / 20 / 14 / 2817 / 2675 / +142; 6 / Laboral Kutxa Baskonia / 34 / 19 / 15 / 2834 / 2669 / +165; 7 / FIATC Joventut / 34 / 19 / 15 / 2652 / 2624 / +28; 8 / Herbalife Gran Canaria / 34 / 18 / 16 / 2638 / 2636 / +2; 9 / CAI Zaragoza / 34 / 18 / 16 / 2512 / 2578 / −66; 10 / UCAM Murcia / 34 / 17 / 17 / 2621 / 2660 / −39; 11 / Iberostar Tenerife / 34 / 16 / 18 / 2651 / 2619 / +32; 12 / Río Natura Monbús Obradoiro / 34 / 15 / 19 / 2467 / 2535 / −68; 13 / Movistar Estudiantes / 34 / 14 / 20 / 2509 / 2615 / −106; 14 / MoraBanc Andorra / 34 / 12 / 22 / 2549 / 2615 / −66; 15 / Baloncesto Sevilla / 34 / 12 / 22 / 2462 / 2673 / −211; 16 / La Bruixa d'Or Manresa / 34 / 11 / 23 / 2456 / 2672 / −216; 17 / Gipuzkoa Basket / 34 / 10 / 24 / 2409 / 2648 / −239; 18 / Montakit Fuenlabrada / 34 / 8 / 26 / 2533 / 2718 / −185; Source: ACB 2nd best league record
Defeated the 8th seeded Herbalife Gran Canaria, 2–0	Quarterfinals	Defeated the 7th seeded FIATC Joventut, 2–0
Defeated the 5th seeded Valencia Basket, 3–1	Semifinals	Defeated the 3rd seeded Unicaja, 3–2

=== Regular season series ===
The Madrid and Barcelona tied the regular season series 1–1, with each team winning its home game.

28 December 2014	FC Barcelona	76–68	Real Madrid	Barcelona
19:00 (CET)	Scoring by quarter: 24–22, 23–18, 11–15, 18–13
	Pts: Doellman, Tomić 12; Rebs: Tomić 8 Asts: three players 3 PIR: Tomić 16	Boxscore	Pts: Mačiulis 14; Rebs: Bourousis, Fernández 5 Asts: Fernández 4 PIR: Fernández 13	Arena: Palau Blaugrana; Attendance: 7,261; Referees: Pérez Pizarro, Cortés, Martínez

12 April 2015	Real Madrid	91–78	FC Barcelona	Madrid
12:15 (CEST)	Scoring by quarter: 26–20, 18–18, 17–25, 30–15
	Pts: Carroll 26; Rebs: Rivers 6 Asts: Rodríguez 9 PIR: Carroll 26	Boxscore	Pts: Tomić 22; Rebs: Tomić 9 Asts: Tomić 4 PIR: Tomić 34	Arena: Barclaycard Center; Attendance: 12,178; Referees: García González, Perea, Fernández

== Series ==
19 June 2015 Game 1	Real Madrid	78–72 (Series: Real Madrid leads series, 1–0)	FC Barcelona	Madrid
19:00 (CEST)	Scoring by quarter: 27–20, 20–20, 12–13, 19–19
	Pts: Fernández 17; Rebs: Ayón 7 Asts: Rodríguez 8 PIR: Fernández 21	Boxscore	Pts: Hezonja 18; Rebs: Pleiß 6 Asts: Huertas, Satoranský 3 PIR: Hezonja 23	Arena: Barclaycard Center; Attendance: 12,127; Referees: Conde, Jiménez, Cortés

21 June 2015 Game 2	Real Madrid	100–80 (Series: Real Madrid leads series, 2–0)	FC Barcelona	Madrid
12:30 (CEST)	Scoring by quarter: 31–10, 18–22, 26–24, 25–24
	Pts: Llull 24; Rebs: Slaughter 6 Asts: Rodríguez 6 PIR: Llull 31	Boxscore	Pts: Doellman 24; Rebs: Doellman 5 Asts: Satoranský 4 PIR: Doellman 23	Arena: Barclaycard Center; Attendance: 12,924; Referees: García González, Pérez Pérez, Bultó

24 June 2015 Game 3	FC Barcelona	85–90 (Series: Real Madrid wins ACB Finals, 3–0)	Real Madrid	Barcelona
19:00 (CEST)	Scoring by quarter: 17–17, 17–31, 33–17, 18–25
	Pts: Tomić 29; Rebs: Doellman, Tomić 7 Asts: Satoranský 8 PIR: Tomić 36	Boxscore	Pts: Carroll 19; Rebs: Nocioni 6 Asts: Rodríguez 6 PIR: Carroll 16	Arena: Palau Blaugrana; Attendance: 7,247; Referees: Hierrezuelo, Pérez Pizarro, Calatrava

== Rosters ==
=== Real Madrid ===
Real Madrid roster
Players
Coaches

Pos.	No.	Nat.	Name	Ht.	Wt.	Age
F/C	14	(Mexico)	Ayón, Gustavo	2.08 m (6 ft 10 in)	113 kg (249 lb)	39 – 1 April 1985
C	30	(Greece)	Bourousis, Ioannis	2.13 m (7 ft 0 in)	122 kg (269 lb)	41 – 17 November 1983
PG	7	(Argentina)	Campazzo, Facundo	1.79 m (5 ft 10 in)	88 kg (194 lb)	33 – 23 March 1991
SG	20	(Azerbaijan)	Carroll, Jaycee	1.88 m (6 ft 2 in)	77 kg (170 lb)	41 – 16 April 1983
G/F	5	(Spain)	Fernández, Rudy	1.98 m (6 ft 6 in)	84 kg (185 lb)	39 – 4 April 1985
G	23	(Spain)	Llull, Sergio	1.92 m (6 ft 4 in)	95.4 kg (210 lb)	37 – 15 November 1987
SF	8	(Lithuania)	Mačiulis, Jonas	2.01 m (6 ft 7 in)	107 kg (236 lb)	40 – 10 February 1985
C	50	(Tunisia)	Mejri, Salah	2.17 m (7 ft 1 in)	111 kg (245 lb)	38 – 15 June 1986
F	6	(Argentina)	Nocioni, Andrés	2.01 m (6 ft 7 in)	102 kg (225 lb)	45 – 30 November 1979
PF	9	(Spain)	Reyes, Felipe (C)	2.06 m (6 ft 9 in)	118 kg (260 lb)	45 – 16 March 1980
SG	4	(United States)	Rivers, K. C.	1.98 m (6 ft 6 in)	100 kg (220 lb)	38 – 1 March 1987
PG	13	(Spain)	Rodríguez, Sergio	1.91 m (6 ft 3 in)	80 kg (176 lb)	38 – 12 June 1986
F/C	44	(United States)	Slaughter, Marcus	2.03 m (6 ft 8 in)	104.5 kg (230 lb)	40 – 18 March 1985

Head coach

- (Spain) Pablo Laso

Assistant coach(es)

- (Croatia) Žan Tabak
- (Spain) Chus Mateo

Legend

- (C) Team captain
- Injured

- Roster

=== FC Barcelona ===
FC Barcelona roster
Players
Coaches

Pos.	No.	Nat.	Name	Ht.	Wt.	Age
SG	10	(Spain)	Abrines, Álex	1.98 m (6 ft 6 in)	86 kg (190 lb)	31 – 1 August 1993
PF	5	(United States)	Doellman, Justin	2.08 m (6 ft 10 in)	102 kg (225 lb)	40 – 3 February 1985
G/F	8	(Croatia)	Hezonja, Mario	2.02 m (6 ft 8 in)	91 kg (201 lb)	30 – 25 February 1995
PG	9	(Brazil)	Huertas, Marcelinho	1.91 m (6 ft 3 in)	84 kg (185 lb)	41 – 25 May 1983
PG	13	(Czech Republic)	Satoranský, Tomáš	1.99 m (6 ft 6 in)	86 kg (190 lb)	33 – 30 October 1991
SF	20	(Sweden)	Eriksson, Marcus (injured)	2.00 m (6 ft 7 in)	89 kg (196 lb)	31 – 5 December 1993
G	25	(France)	Jackson, Edwin	1.91 m (6 ft 3 in)	91 kg (201 lb)	35 – 18 September 1989
C	30	(Poland)	Lampe, Maciej	2.11 m (6 ft 11 in)	125 kg (276 lb)	40 – 5 February 1985
SF	34	(Slovenia)	Nachbar, Boštjan	2.07 m (6 ft 9 in)	102 kg (225 lb)	44 – 3 July 1980
SG	11	(Spain)	Navarro, Juan Carlos	1.92 m (6 ft 4 in)	90.5 kg (200 lb)	44 – 13 June 1980
SG	24	(United States)	Oleson, Brad	1.91 m (6 ft 3 in)	90.5 kg (200 lb)	41 – 11 April 1983
C	21	(Germany)	Pleiß, Tibor	2.16 m (7 ft 1 in)	122 kg (269 lb)	35 – 2 November 1989
SF	23	(United States)	Thomas, Deshaun	2.01 m (6 ft 7 in)	98 kg (216 lb)	33 – 28 August 1991
C	44	(Croatia)	Tomić, Ante	2.18 m (7 ft 2 in)	120 kg (265 lb)	38 – 17 February 1987

Head coach

- (Spain) Xavier Pascual

Assistant coach(es)

- (Spain) Agustín Julbé
- (Spain) Iñigo Zorzano
- (Spain) David García

Legend

- (C) Team captain
- Injured

- Roster
