= Marco Crespi (basketball) =

Italian basketball coach (born 1962)

Personal information
- Born: 2 June 1962 (age 64) Varese, Italy
- Position: Head coach
- Coaching career: 1979–present

Career history

Coaching
- 1979–1983: Bustese Busto Arsizio (Youth Teams)
- 1983–1990: Olimpia Milano (Youth Teams)
- 1990–1997: Olimpia Milano (Assistant)
- 1997–1998: Italy Under-22
- 1997–2000: Italy (Assistant)
- 1998–2000: Olimpia Milano
- 2000–2001: Pallacanestro Biella
- 2001–2002: CB Sevilla
- 2002–2003, 2004–2005: Scavolini Pesaro
- 2006–2012: Junior Casale Monferrato
- 2012–2013: Mens Sana Basket Siena (Assistant)
- 2013–2014: Mens Sana Basket Siena
- 2014: Baskonia
- 2015–2016: Scaligera Verona

Career highlights
- As head coach: Italian Super Cup winner (2013); 2× Italian 2nd Division champion (2001, 2011)

Marco Crespi (born 2 June 1962) is an Italian professional basketball coach. He served as a Head Coach of Baskonia and Scaligera Verona of the Italian League. He ended his career 2021 as Head Coach for Sweden women's national basketball team.

== Coaching career ==
Crespi became the head coach of the Italian League club Mens Sana Basket Siena in 2013.

== NBA scouting career ==
Crespi has worked as the director of international scouting for NBA clubs like the Boston Celtics and the Phoenix Suns.

== Awards and accomplishments ==
- 2× Italian 2nd Division Champion: (2001, 2011)
- Italian Super Cup Winner: (2013)
