= 2014–15 ACB season =

32nd season of Spanish basketball league

Liga Endesa^{1}
- Season: 2014–15
- Games played: 306 (Regular season); 22 (Playoffs)
- Teams: 18
- TV partners: TVE, FORTA

Regular season
- Top seed: Real Madrid
- Season MVP: (Spain) Felipe Reyes
- Relegated: Gipuzkoa Basket; Montakit Fuenlabrada

Finals
- Champions: Real Madrid (32nd title)
- Runners-up: FC Barcelona
- Semi-finalists: Unicaja; Valencia Basket
- Finals MVP: (Spain) Sergio Llull

Awards
- Best Young Player: (Spain) Dani Díez

Statistical leaders
Points	(United States) Andy Panko	18.6
Rebounds	(Cape Verde) Walter Tavares	8.1
Assists	(United States) Jared Jordan	7.0
Index Rating	(United States) Andy Panko	18.9

Records
- Biggest home win: Obradoiro 104–52 Murcia (14 March 2015)
- Biggest away win: Joventut 61–99 Barcelona (15 February 2015)
- Highest scoring: Barcelona 114–110 Unicaja (11 January 2015)
- Winning streak: 10 games Real Madrid
- Losing streak: 8 games Baloncesto Sevilla; MoraBanc Andorra
- Highest attendance: 12,924; Madrid 100–80 Barcelona (21 June 2015)
- Lowest attendance: 2,022; Sevilla 57–77 Andorra (21 December 2014)
- Average attendance: 6,375
- All statistics correct as of 24 June 2015.^{1} Sponsored league name, referring to Endesa.

The 2014–15 ACB season was the 32nd season of the Spanish basketball league, also called Liga Endesa in its sponsored identity. The regular season started on 4 October 2014 and finished on 24 May 2015. The playoffs, joined by the eight first qualified teams, was played between 28 May and 24 June 2015.

== Teams ==
=== Promotion and relegation (pre-season) ===
A total of 18 teams contested the league, including 16 sides from the 2013–14 season and two promoted from the 2013–14 LEB Oro. Bilbao Basket was initially excluded from the league but on 8 August, the ACB was forced to re-admit Bilbao.

Teams promoted from LEB Oro

- MoraBanc Andorra
- ~~Ford Burgos~~ (did not fulfill the requirements, its place was offered La Bruixa d'Or Manresa)

=== Venues and locations ===
Location of teams in 2014–15 ACB
Location of teams from the Canary Islands in 2014–15 ACB

Team	Home city	Arena	Capacity
Baloncesto Sevilla	Sevilla	San Pablo	7,626
CAI Zaragoza	Zaragoza	Pabellón Príncipe Felipe	10,744
Dominion Bilbao Basket	Bilbao	Bilbao Arena	10,014
FC Barcelona	Barcelona	Palau Blaugrana	7,585
FIATC Joventut	Badalona	Palau Municipal d'Esports	8,500
Gipuzkoa Basket	San Sebastián	San Sebastián Arena	11,000
Herbalife Gran Canaria	Las Palmas	Gran Canaria Arena	9,870
Iberostar Tenerife	San Cristóbal de La Laguna	Santiago Martín	5,003
La Bruixa d'Or Manresa	Manresa	Nou Congost	5,000
Laboral Kutxa Baskonia	Vitoria-Gasteiz	Fernando Buesa Arena	15,504
Montakit Fuenlabrada	Fuenlabrada	Fernando Martín	5,100
MoraBanc Andorra	Andorra la Vella	Poliesportiu d'Andorra	5,000
Movistar Estudiantes	Madrid	Barclaycard Center	15,000
Real Madrid	Madrid	Barclaycard Center	15,000
Rio Natura Monbus Obradoiro	Santiago de Compostela	Multiusos Fontes do Sar	5,060
UCAM Murcia	Murcia	Palacio de Deportes	7,341
Unicaja	Málaga	Martín Carpena	10,233
Valencia Basket	Valencia	Fuente de San Luis	8,500

=== Personnel and sponsorship ===
Team	Head coach	Captain	Kit manufacturer	Shirt sponsor
Baloncesto Sevilla^{1}	(Spain) Luis Casimiro	(Czech Republic) Ondřej Balvín	Spalding	
CAI Zaragoza	(Spain) Joaquín Ruiz Lorente	(Netherlands) Henk Norel	Mercury	Caja Inmaculada
Dominion Bilbao Basket	(Spain) Sito Alonso	(Spain) Álex Mumbrú	Kon	Dominion
FC Barcelona	(Spain) Xavi Pascual	(Spain) Juan Carlos Navarro	Nike	
FIATC Joventut	(Spain) Salva Maldonado	(Spain) Nacho Llovet	Spalding	FIATC
Gipuzkoa Basket	(Spain) Jaume Ponsarnau	(Spain) David Doblas	Elements	
Herbalife Gran Canaria	(Spain) Aíto García Reneses	(Spain) Tomás Bellas	Spalding	Herbalife
Iberostar Tenerife	(Spain) Alejandro Martínez	(Spain) Jaime Heras	Austral	Iberostar
La Bruixa d'Or Manresa	(Spain) Pedro Martínez	(Spain) Álex Hernández	Joma	La Bruixa d'Or
Laboral Kutxa Baskonia	(Spain) Ibon Navarro	(Spain) Fernando San Emeterio	Hummel	Laboral Kutxa
Montakit Fuenlabrada	(Spain) Jesús Sala	(Spain) Javier Vega	Luanvi	Montakit
MoraBanc Andorra	(Spain) Joan Peñarroya	(Spain) Marc Blanch	Luanvi	MoraBanc
Movistar Estudiantes	(Spain) Txus Vidorreta	(Spain) Jaime Fernández	Joma	Movistar
Real Madrid	(Spain) Pablo Laso	(Spain) Felipe Reyes	Adidas	Teka
Rio Natura Monbus Obradoiro	(Spain) Moncho Fernández	(Spain) Alberto Corbacho	Vive	Rio Natura, Monbus
UCAM Murcia	(Spain) Diego Ocampo	(Spain) José Ángel Antelo	Spalding	UCAM
Unicaja	(Spain) Joan Plaza	(Spain) Fran Vázquez	Spalding	Unicaja, Benahavís
Valencia Basket	(Spain) Carles Duran	(Spain) Rafa Martínez	Luanvi	Cultura del Esfuerzo^{2}

Notes
1. ACB did not process the license of Scott Roth, head coach of Sevilla until January 2015, but he managed the team with the license of Audie Norris, who appeared officially as head coach.
2. Cultura del Esfuerzo is the motto of the club.

=== Managerial changes ===
Team	Outgoing manager	Manner of departure	Date of vacancy	Position in table	Replaced with	Date of appointment
La Bruixa d'Or Manresa	(Spain) Pere Romero	End of contract		Pre-season	(Spain) Pedro Martínez	2 August 2014
Gipuzkoa Basket	(Spain) Sito Alonso	Resigned	2 June 2014	Pre-season	(Spain) Jaume Ponsarnau	22 July 2014
Herbalife Gran Canaria	(Spain) Pedro Martínez	End of contract	10 June 2014	Pre-season	(Spain) Aíto García Reneses	16 July 2014
Bilbao Basket	(Spain) Rafa Pueyo	End of contract	12 June 2014	Pre-season	(Spain) Sito Alonso	17 June 2014
UCAM Murcia	(Argentina) Marcelo Nicola	End of contract	19 June 2014	Pre-season	(Spain) Diego Ocampo	1 July 2014
Laboral Kutxa Baskonia	(Italy) Sergio Scariolo	Sacked	26 June 2014	Pre-season	(Italy) Marco Crespi	7 August 2014
Baloncesto Sevilla	(Spain) Aíto García Reneses	Resigned	7 July 2014	Pre-season	(United States) Scott Roth	29 July 2014
CAI Zaragoza	(Spain) José Luis Abós	Resigned	4 August 2014	Pre-season	(Spain) Joaquín Ruiz Lorente	4 August 2014
Laboral Kutxa Baskonia	(Italy) Marco Crespi	Sacked	13 November 2014	12th (2–4)	(Spain) Ibon Navarro	13 November 2014
Montakit Fuenlabrada	(Spain) Luis Casimiro	Sacked	6 January 2015	17th (3–12)	(Spain) Hugo López	8 January 2015
Valencia Basket	(Croatia) Velimir Perasović	Sacked	22 January 2015	6th (10–7)	(Spain) Carles Duran	22 January 2015
Baloncesto Sevilla	(United States) Scott Roth	Sacked	22 January 2015	18th (3–14)	(Spain) Luis Casimiro	30 January 2015
Montakit Fuenlabrada	(Spain) Hugo López	Mutual consent	6 April 2015	18th (6–21)	(Spain) Jesús Sala	6 April 2015

== Season summary ==
=== Bilbao Basket v Laboral Kutxa Baskonia brawl ===
On March 1, 2015, the Basque basketball derby between Bilbao Basket and Laboral Kutxa Baskonia at Bilbao Arena finished with a brawl where Dejan Todorović of Bilbao and Tornike Shengelia of Baskonia were disqualified and twelve players were ejected due to court invasion during the fight.

With four seconds left, despite the referee's call for a travelling, Todorović was going to dunk when he was hit by Shengelia. After this, the Montenegrin player pushed Shengelia from behind and the Georgian forward reacted with a punch. After this, all the players who were on the bench came into the court and started the brawl. When Shengelia was leaving the court after the disqualifying foul, he apologized to a child who was in the first row of the arena.

The ACB announced this brawl would have severe consequences and sanctions and would talk with the Spanish Basketball Federation for changing the disciplinary regulations. On March 5, the league provisionally suspended Todorović and Shengelia until the final resolution of the case.

After knowing the notice, both clubs claimed to have the same sanctions than in 2004, when the brawl Real Madrid and Estudiantes occurred. Finally, on March 11, the Disciplinary Judge accorded to suspend Tornike Shengelia for five games, Dejan Todorović for four and a €3,000 fine to Bilbao Basket player Dairis Bertāns and to Baskonia brothers Mamadou and Ilimane Diop.

== Regular season ==
=== League table ===
Pos	Team	Pld	W	L	PF	PA	PD	Qualification or relegation
1	Real Madrid	34	27	7	2903	2640	+263	Qualification to playoffs
2	FC Barcelona	34	25	9	2806	2455	+351	Qualification to playoffs
3	Unicaja	34	25	9	2644	2490	+154	Qualification to playoffs
4	Dominion Bilbao Basket	34	20	14	2559	2514	+45	Qualification to playoffs
5	Valencia Basket	34	20	14	2817	2675	+142	Qualification to playoffs
6	Laboral Kutxa Baskonia	34	19	15	2834	2669	+165	Qualification to playoffs
7	FIATC Joventut	34	19	15	2652	2624	+28	Qualification to playoffs
8	Herbalife Gran Canaria	34	18	16	2638	2636	+2	Qualification to playoffs
9	CAI Zaragoza	34	18	16	2512	2578	−66	
10	UCAM Murcia	34	17	17	2621	2660	−39	
11	Iberostar Tenerife	34	16	18	2651	2619	+32	
12	Rio Natura Monbus Obradoiro	34	15	19	2467	2535	−68	
13	Movistar Estudiantes	34	14	20	2509	2615	−106	
14	MoraBanc Andorra	34	12	22	2549	2615	−66	
15	Baloncesto Sevilla	34	12	22	2462	2673	−211	
16	La Bruixa d'Or Manresa	34	11	23	2456	2672	−216	
17	Gipuzkoa Basket (R)	34	10	24	2409	2648	−239	Relegation to LEB Oro
18	Montakit Fuenlabrada (R)	34	8	26	2533	2718	−185	Relegation to LEB Oro

Source: ACB
(R) Relegated

=== Positions by round ===
The table lists the positions of teams after completion of each round.

Team \ Round	1	2	3	4	5	6	7	8	9	10	11	12	13	14	15	16	17	18	19	20	21	22	23	24	25	26	27	28	29	30	31	32	33	34
Real Madrid	6	2	3	3	2	1	1	1	1	1	3	1	3	3	2	2	2	2	2	2	2	2	1	1	2	2	2	2	1	1	1	1	1	1
FC Barcelona	2	1	1	1	3	2	2	2	2	3	2	3	2	2	5	5	5	5	5	4	3	3	3	3	3	3	3	3	3	3	3	3	2	2
Unicaja	5	3	2	2	1	3	3	3	3	2	1	2	1	1	1	1	1	1	1	1	1	1	2	2	1	1	1	1	2	2	2	2	3	3
Dominion Bilbao Basket	3	4	4	7	4	4	4	4	4	4	4	5	5	4	3	3	4	3	3	3	4	4	4	4	4	4	4	4	4	5	4	5	4	4
Valencia Basket	12	7	6	4	6	5	5	9	8	6	6	6	6	6	6	6	6	6	6	6	6	6	6	7	7	7	6	6	5	4	5	4	5	5
Laboral Kutxa Baskonia	17	16	15	12	11	12	10	11	11	11	11	11	9	11	10	11	9	9	9	7	7	8	8	6	6	5	7	5	6	6	6	7	7	6
FIATC Joventut	9	6	8	9	10	7	7	7	5	5	5	4	4	5	4	4	3	4	4	5	5	5	5	5	5	6	5	7	7	7	7	6	6	7
Herbalife Gran Canaria	13	11	13	15	14	11	12	12	12	12	12	12	11	8	8	7	7	7	7	8	8	9	9	9	9	9	9	9	9	9	8	8	8	8
CAI Zaragoza	10	12	11	10	9	9	6	5	7	7	8	7	7	7	7	8	8	8	8	9	9	7	7	8	8	8	8	8	8	10	9	9	9	9
UCAM Murcia	8	5	9	5	7	6	9	6	9	10	9	8	8	10	9	10	11	11	12	12	11	11	11	11	10	11	12	12	11	11	11	10	10	10
Iberostar Tenerife	7	10	7	8	5	8	11	8	10	8	10	9	10	12	12	12	12	12	10	10	10	10	10	10	11	12	10	10	10	8	10	11	11	11
Rio Natura Monbus Obradoiro	1	9	5	6	8	10	8	10	6	9	7	10	12	9	11	9	10	10	11	11	12	12	12	12	12	10	11	11	12	12	12	12	12	12
Movistar Estudiantes	4	8	10	11	12	14	14	14	14	13	13	13	14	14	15	14	13	13	13	13	13	13	13	13	13	13	13	13	13	13	14	13	13	13
MoraBanc Andorra	14	13	12	13	13	13	13	13	13	14	14	14	13	13	13	15	15	15	15	15	17	15	16	15	15	15	15	15	14	14	13	14	14	14
Baloncesto Sevilla	11	17	17	18	18	18	15	15	16	16	16	17	18	18	18	18	18	18	18	17	15	16	18	17	16	17	16	16	16	15	16	15	15	15
La Bruixa d'Or Manresa	18	18	18	16	16	16	17	18	18	18	18	18	17	16	16	17	16	16	16	16	18	18	17	18	17	16	17	17	17	18	17	17	17	16
Gipuzkoa Basket	15	15	16	17	17	17	18	16	15	15	15	16	15	15	14	13	14	14	14	14	14	14	14	14	14	14	14	14	15	16	15	16	16	17
Montakit Fuenlabrada	16	14	14	14	15	15	16	17	17	17	17	15	16	17	17	16	17	17	17	18	16	17	15	16	18	18	18	18	18	17	18	18	18	18

=== Results ===
Home \ Away	SEV	CAI	DBB	FCB	CJB	GBC	HGC	TFE	BXA	LBO	FUE	MBA	MOV	RMB	RNM	UCM	UNI	VBC
Baloncesto Sevilla		77–73	80–69	85–74	77–70	61–76	75–83	87–96	72–80	83–91	68–71	57–77	74–65	72–81	86–60	83–96	75–70	79–72
CAI Zaragoza	97–99		76–64	67–103	74–79	72–65	78–102	72–83	82–77	105–94	86–69	84–79	82–78	74–80	82–74	82–63	82–76	69–77
Dominion Bilbao Basket	89–61	71–82		73–67	95–92	92–66	90–74	83–101	86–77	93–75	73–54	84–72	64–63	89–79	70–58	82–74	93–94	82–80
FC Barcelona	99–83	90–67	80–73		82–83	71–58	80–61	87–79	101–53	87–65	88–82	84–74	76–62	76–68	79–57	90–70	114–110	76–57
FIATC Joventut	75–64	73–67	85–79	61–99		91–66	81–79	88–85	82–63	83–82	85–65	67–82	65–60	80–81	72–78	77–54	82–74	91–95
Gipuzkoa Basket	67–69	61–76	80–67	43–57	63–66		72–74	77–76	82–75	66–95	74–86	67–64	76–82	76–90	97–94	67–70	72–76	69–67
Herbalife Gran Canaria	71–70	85–67	60–70	76–70	79–77	71–70		79–64	75–81	93–77	88–77	90–81	79–63	80–88	72–57	80–92	67–74	90–76
Iberostar Tenerife	82–61	66–67	68–85	66–80	89–83	77–68	71–68		66–62	91–56	99–74	83–56	81–74	82–93	77–53	78–72	71–89	74–81
La Bruixa d'Or Manresa	72–78	57–73	76–77	69–88	79–84	64–79	73–81	75–73		64–71	68–53	88–80	81–75	66–83	78–59	80–68	80–76	78–77
Laboral Kutxa Baskonia	100–60	73–45	86–74	103–94	87–68	79–62	109–70	84–74	87–67		77–71	89–74	94–59	94–81	85–77	77–85	79–88	94–88
Montakit Fuenlabrada	82–81	67–69	85–91	64–79	73–77	65–76	65–76	83–66	90–64	91–83		88–65	93–84	94–96	82–88	66–71	75–78	64–87
MoraBanc Andorra	89–65	72–59	75–76	56–71	84–81	77–88	91–86	73–58	80–64	87–85	91–85		81–76	70–79	65–74	68–74	74–77	64–65
Movistar Estudiantes	65–82	66–61	83–77	102–96	78–75	91–74	84–75	66–79	78–73	86–76	86–79	58–55		89–84	79–57	90–79	78–85	76–81
Real Madrid	87–81	89–71	78–52	91–78	90–88	86–70	70–57	94–85	80–90	75–74	86–69	84–83	92–66		91–73	90–65	92–77	90–71
Rio Natura Monbus	88–77	77–69	77–72	79–67	67–71	85–69	80–68	63–82	88–64	74–81	75–63	78–73	60–59	76–85		104–52	78–66	62–73
UCAM Murcia	98–68	71–75	91–65	64–76	70–77	99–68	85–89	104–81	83–72	93–88	82–69	73–77	79–65	86–79	68–64		86–96	85–76
Unicaja	82–76	86–90	86–74	61–74	81–77	74–59	77–68	84–68	81–65	76–74	72–63	83–69	66–62	99–92	80–69	80–56		89–85
Valencia Basket	96–73	106–109	73–78	93–73	83–66	109–86	101–92	98–80	84–81	85–70	89–76	95–91	84–67	87–99	81–64	81–63	64–75	

Legend: Blue = home team win; Red = away team win.

== Playoffs ==
Quarterfinals
Real Madrid	101	93
Herbalife Gran Canaria	74	86
Dominion Bilbao Basket	75	80	70
Valencia Basket	91	76	71
FC Barcelona	77	80
FIATC Joventut	55	74
Unicaja	69	82	89
Laboral Kutxa Baskonia	55	92	77

Semifinals
Real Madrid	81	89	103	90
Valencia Basket	71	93	100	84
FC Barcelona	91	91	84	66	77
Unicaja	60	70	89	77	74

Finals
Real Madrid	78	100	90
FC Barcelona	72	80	85

== Final standings ==
Pos	Team	Pld	W	L	Qualification or relegation
1	Real Madrid (C)	43	35	8	Qualification to Euroleague (Note: Real Madrid, FC Barcelona and Laboral Kutxa Baskonia were already qualified to Euroleague.)
2	FC Barcelona	44	30	14	Qualification to Euroleague
3	Unicaja	42	29	13	Qualification to Euroleague
4	Valencia Basket	41	23	18	Qualification to Eurocup
5	Dominion Bilbao Basket	37	21	16	Qualification to Eurocup
6	Laboral Kutxa Baskonia	37	20	17	Qualification to Euroleague
7	FIATC Joventut (Note: FIATC Joventut resigned to play European competitions.)	36	19	17	
8	Herbalife Gran Canaria	36	18	18	Qualification to Eurocup
9	CAI Zaragoza	34	18	16	Qualification to Eurocup
10	UCAM Murcia	34	17	17	
11	Iberostar Tenerife	34	16	18	
12	Rio Natura Monbus Obradoiro	34	15	19	
13	Movistar Estudiantes	34	14	20	
14	MoraBanc Andorra	34	12	22	
15	Baloncesto Sevilla	34	12	22	
16	La Bruixa d'Or Manresa	34	11	23	
17	Gipuzkoa Basket (R)	34	10	24	Relegation to LEB Oro
18	Montakit Fuenlabrada (R)	34	8	26	Relegation to LEB Oro

Source: ACB
(C) Champions; (R) Relegated

== Attendances ==
Attendances include playoff games:

Pos	Team	Total	High	Low	Average	Change
1	Real Madrid	206,930	12,924	6,897	9,406	+1.8%
2	Laboral Kutxa Baskonia	160,517	11,246	7,812	8,918	−3.0%
3	Dominion Bilbao Basket	168,243	10,014	7,314	8,855	−2.7%
4	Valencia Basket	161,200	8,500	7,200	8,060	+0.7%
5	CAI Zaragoza	134,869	9,213	6,127	7,933	−1.0%
6	Movistar Estudiantes	133,269	12,500	4,560	7,839	−1.1%
7	Unicaja	158,871	10,594	5,778	7,565	+19.8%
8	Herbalife Gran Canaria	112,652	9,056	4,125	6,258	+21.6%
9	UCAM Murcia	101,457	7,500	5,126	5,968	+6.9%
10	FIATC Joventut	106,760	8,057	4,435	5,931	+8.8%
11	Gipuzkoa Basket	95,078	7,431	4,203	5,593	−6.8%
12	Rio Natura Monbus Obradoiro	86,110	5,582	4,566	5,065	+0.1%
13	Montakit Fuenlabrada	84,889	5,659	3,126	4,993	+2.7%
14	FC Barcelona	107,088	7,261	3,916	4,868	−0.8%
15	La Bruixa d'Or Manresa	72,300	4,700	3,700	4,253	+5.7%
16	Baloncesto Sevilla	70,599	7,082	2,022	4,153	−0.1%
17	Iberostar Tenerife	69,121	4,910	3,306	4,066	+5.1%
18	MoraBanc Andorra	61,181	4,774	2,480	3,599	+139.9%^{1}
	League total	2,091,134	12,924	2,022	6,375	+2.8%

Updated to games played on 24 June 2015
Source: ACB
Notes:
1: MoraBanc Andorra played last season in LEB Oro.

== Statistics ==
=== Points ===
Pos	Player	Club	PPG
1	(United States) Andy Panko	Montakit Fuenlabrada	18.6
2	(Serbia) Stevan Jelovac	CAI Zaragoza	14.1
3	(Spain) Álex Mumbrú	Dominion Bilbao Basket	14.1
4	(Spain) Nacho Martín	Montakit Estudiantes	13.0
5	(United States) Mike James	Laboral Kutxa Baskonia	12.9

=== Rebounds ===
Pos	Player	Club	RPG
1	(Cape Verde) Walter Tavares	Herbalife Gran Canaria	7.9
2	(Montenegro) Marko Todorović	Dominion Bilbao Basket	7.3
3	(Brazil) Augusto Lima	UCAM Murcia	7.2
4	(Spain) Dani Díez	Gipuzkoa Basket	6.8
5	(Nigeria) Deji Akindele	Montakit Fuenlabrada	6.8

=== Assists ===
Pos	Player	Club	APG
1	(United States) Jared Jordan	Gipuzkoa Basket	7.0
2	(Spain) Quino Colom	Dominion Bilbao Basket	5.8
3	(Spain) Sergio Rodríguez	Real Madrid	5.2
4	(Uruguay) Jayson Granger	Unicaja	5.2
5	(Spain) Javi Salgado	Movistar Estudiantes	4.4

=== Performance Index Rating ===
Pos	Player	Club	PPG
1	(United States) Andy Panko	Montakit Fuenlabrada	18.9
2	(Montenegro) Marko Todorović	Dominion Bilbao Basket	17.8
3	(Brazil) Augusto Lima	UCAM Murcia	16.6
4	(Serbia) Stevan Jelovac	CAI Zaragoza	15.8
5	(United States) Luke Sikma	Iberostar Tenerife	15.6

Source: ACB

=== Season highs ===
Category		Player	Club
Points	36	(Germany) Maxi Kleber	Rio Natura Monbus Obradoiro
Rebounds	18	(Cape Verde) Walter Tavares	Herbalife Gran Canaria
Assists	14	(Spain) Javi Salgado	Movistar Estudiantes
Steals	7	(France) Fabien Causeur	Laboral Kutxa Baskonia
Blocks	6	(Senegal) Sitapha Savané	FIATC Joventut

== Awards ==
All official awards of the 2014–15 ACB season.

=== MVP ===
- (Spain) Felipe Reyes (Real Madrid)

=== Finals MVP ===
- (Spain) Sergio Llull (Real Madrid)

=== All-ACB Team ===
Position	Player	Team
PG	(Uruguay) Jayson Granger	Unicaja
SG	(Spain) Sergio Llull	Real Madrid
SF	(Spain) Pau Ribas	Valencia Basket
PF	(Spain) Felipe Reyes	Real Madrid
C	(Montenegro) Marko Todorović	Dominion Bilbao Basket

=== Best Young Player Award ===
- (Spain) Dani Díez – Gipuzkoa Basket

=== Best All-Young Team ===
Position	Player	Team
G	(Spain) Guillem Vives	Valencia Basket
F	(Spain) Álex Abrines	FC Barcelona
F	(Spain) Dani Díez	Gipuzkoa Basket
C	(Latvia) Kristaps Porziņģis	Baloncesto Sevilla
C	(Spain) Willy Hernangómez	Baloncesto Sevilla

=== Player of the week ===
Since this season, only players whose team wins are eligible for this award.

Date	Player	Team	PIR
1	(Brazil) Augusto Lima	UCAM Murcia	31
2	(Montenegro) Marko Todorović	Bilbao Basket	31
3	(Austria) Thomas Schreiner (Spain) Fran Vázquez	MoraBanc Andorra; Unicaja	25
4	(Croatia) Željko Šakić	La Bruixa d'Or Manresa	35
5	(Latvia) Dāvis Bertāns	Laboral Kutxa Baskonia	28
6	(Dominican Republic) Eulis Báez (Spain) Felipe Reyes	Herbalife Gran Canaria; Real Madrid	29
7	(Poland) Maciej Lampe	FC Barcelona	31
8	(Montenegro) Marko Todorović (2) (Croatia) Ante Tomić	Bilbao Basket; FC Barcelona	28
9	(Spain) Álex Abrines (France) Fabien Causeur	FC Barcelona; Laboral Kutxa Baskonia	27
10	(Spain) Willy Hernangómez	Baloncesto Sevilla	43
11	(Germany) Tibor Pleiß	FC Barcelona	29
12	(United States) Andy Panko	Montakit Fuenlabrada	36
13	(Spain) Fernando San Emeterio	Laboral Kutxa Baskonia	24
14	(Uruguay) Jayson Granger	Unicaja	35
15	(Spain) Quino Colom	Bilbao Basket	26
16	(Nigeria) Jeleel Akindele	Montakit Fuenlabrada	32
17	(United States) Colton Iverson	Laboral Kutxa Baskonia	29
18	(Montenegro) Marko Todorović (3)	Bilbao Basket	28
19	(Croatia) Mario Hezonja	FC Barcelona	29
20	(Spain) Dani Díez	Gipuzkoa Basket	36
21	(United States) Andy Panko (2)	Montakit Fuenlabrada	33
22	(Spain) Rudy Fernández (North Macedonia) Vojdan Stojanovski	Real Madrid; MoraBanc Andorra	26
23	(Nigeria) Jeleel Akindele (2)	Montakit Fuenlabrada	35
24	(Spain) Felipe Reyes (2)	Real Madrid	31
25	(Germany) Maxi Kleber	Rio Natura Monbus Obradoiro	45
26	(Spain) Fernando San Emeterio (2)	Laboral Kutxa Baskonia	30
27	(Spain) Pau Ribas	Valencia Basket	26
28	(France) Fabien Causeur (2)	Laboral Kutxa Baskonia	32
29	(Spain) Pau Ribas (2)	Valencia Basket	30
30	(Serbia) Luka Bogdanović (Croatia) Goran Suton	MoraBanc Andorra; FIATC Joventut	30
31	(Montenegro) Marko Todorović (4)	Dominion Bilbao Basket	27
32	(Poland) Adam Waczyński	Rio Natura Monbus Obradoiro	30
33	(Dominican Republic) Eulis Báez (2)	Herbalife Gran Canaria	29
34	(Brazil) Augusto Lima (2) (France) Kim Tillie	UCAM Murcia; Laboral Kutxa Baskonia	31

=== Player of the month ===
The players with more PIR per game in the month wins this award.

Month	Week	Player	Team	PIR
October	1–4	(Montenegro) Blagota Sekulić	Iberostar Tenerife	22.4
November	5–9	(Spain) Felipe Reyes	Real Madrid	19.6
December	10–14	(United States) Andy Panko	Montakit Fuenlabrada	24.6
January	15–18	(Nigeria) Jeleel Akindele	Montakit Fuenlabrada	23
February	19–21	(United States) Andy Panko (2)	Montakit Fuenlabrada	23.3
March	22–26	(Montenegro) Marko Todorović	Dominion Bilbao Basket	20.6
April	27–30	(United States) Andy Panko (3)	Montakit Fuenlabrada	23.3
May	31–34	(Montenegro) Marko Todorović (2)	Dominion Bilbao Basket	22.0
