= 2015 Euroleague Final Four =

Basketball tournament

- Official logo, published in November 2014
- Season: 2014–15 Euroleague

Tournament details
- Arena: Barclaycard Center; Madrid, Spain
- Dates: 15–17 May 2015

Final positions
- Champions: (Spain) Real Madrid (9th title)
- Runners-up: (Greece) Olympiacos
- Third place: (Russia) CSKA Moscow
- Fourth place: (Turkey) Fenerbahçe Ülker

Awards and statistics
- MVP: (Argentina) Andrés Nocioni
- Top scorer(s): (United States) Andrew Goudelock (50)
- Attendance: 47,492 (total)

The 2015 Euroleague Final Four was the concluding EuroLeague Final Four tournament of the 2014–15 Euroleague season. The Final Four was held on 15 and 17 May 2015. All of the games were played at the Barclaycard Center, in Madrid, Spain. It was the third time the city of Madrid hosted the Final Four, and the 6th time the Final of the EuroLeague was played there.

Real Madrid won its 9th EuroLeague title, after they beat Olympiacos, by a score of 78–59. CSKA Moscow took the third place, while Fenerbahçe Ülker finished in fourth.

== Road to the Final Four ==
Team	Regular season			Top 16			Quarterfinals	
Team	Group	W	L	Group	W	L	Opponent	Score
Real Madrid	A (1st)	8	2	E (1st)	11	3	(Turkey) Anadolu Efes	3–1
CSKA Moscow	B (1st)	10	0	F (1st)	12	2	(Greece) Panathinaikos	3–1
Olympiacos	D (1st)	8	2	F (3rd)	10	4	(Spain) FC Barcelona	3–1
Fenerbahçe Ülker	C (2nd)	8	2	F (2nd)	11	3	(Israel) Maccabi Tel Aviv	3–0

== Bracket ==
Semifinals
15 May
(Spain) Real Madrid	96
(Turkey) Fenerbahçe Ülker	87
15 May
(Russia) CSKA Moscow	68
(Greece) Olympiacos	70

Championship game
17 May
(Spain) Real Madrid	78
(Greece) Olympiacos	59
Third place game
17 May
(Turkey) Fenerbahçe Ülker	80
(Russia) CSKA Moscow	86

== Semifinals ==
All times are CEST (UTC+2).

=== CSKA Moscow vs. Olympiacos ===
CSKA Moscow came into the semifinals, widely considered to be the favourite. It was a rematch of the 2012 Final and 2013 Semifinal. Both of those previous games were won by Olympiacos.

Olympiacos rallied late in the fourth quarter, after it had been down by 9 with four minutes to go. Vassilis Spanoulis came up clutch, as he scored 11 points in the fourth quarter, to pull Olympiacos away from CSKA. Aaron Jackson set a Final Four record during the game, with 7 steals.

15 May 2015	CSKA Moscow (Russia)	68–70	(Greece) Olympiacos	Barclaycard Center, Madrid
18:00	Scoring by quarter: 20–17, 16–18, 15–12, 17–23
	Pts: De Colo 18; Rebs: Kirilenko, Vorontsevich 5 Asts: Jackson 7 PIR: Kaun 17	Boxscore	Pts: Printezis 14; Rebs: Printezis 8 Asts: Mantzaris, Printezis 4 PIR: Printezis 22	Attendance: 12,022; Referees: Ilija Belošević (SRB), Borys Ryzhyk (UKR), Daniel Hierrezuelo (ESP)

=== Real Madrid vs. Fenerbahçe Ülker ===
The hosts, Real Madrid, were considered the favourites to win the game against Fenerbahçe, which made its Final Four debut.

Real Madrid dominated in the first half, and they led 55–35 at halftime. A fourth quarter rally by Fenerbahçe came up too little, too late. Gustavo Ayón was top scorer for Real, with 18 points. Andrew Goudelock scored 26 for Fenerbahçe.

15 May 2015	Real Madrid (Spain)	96–87	(Turkey) Fenerbahçe Ülker	Barclaycard Center, Madrid
21:00	Scoring by quarter: 20–21, 35–14, 21–24, 20–28
	Pts: Ayón 18; Rebs: Ayón 7 Asts: Llull 9 PIR: Ayón 30	Boxscore	Pts: Goudelock 26; Rebs: Goudelock, Veselý 6 Asts: Bogdanović, Goudelock 4 PIR: Veselý 31	Attendance: 12,634; Referees: Christos Christodolou (GRE), Saša Pukl (SLO), Robert Lottermoser (GER)

== Third place game ==
17 May 2015	Fenerbahçe Ülker (Turkey)	80–86	(Russia) CSKA Moscow	Barclaycard Center, Madrid
17:00	Scoring by quarter: 13–27, 11–21, 31–18, 25–20
	Pts: Goudelock 24; Rebs: Bjelica 10; Asts: Zisis 6 PIR: Bjelica 26	Boxscore	Pts: De Colo 17; Rebs: Kirilenko, Kaun 6 Asts: Jackson 6 PIR: Jackson 18	Attendance: 9,849; Referees: Daniel Hierrezuelo (ESP), Robert Lottermoser (GER), Oļegs Latiševs (LAT)

== Championship game ==
The game was a re-match of the 2013 Euroleague Final and the 1995 FIBA European League Final.

17 May 2015	Real Madrid (Spain)	78–59	(Greece) Olympiacos	Barclaycard Center, Madrid
20:00 (CET)	Scoring by quarter: 15–19, 20–9, 18–18, 25–13
	Pts: Carroll 16; Rebs: Nocioni 7 Asts: Llull, Rodríguez 4 PIR: Carroll, Nocioni 18	Boxscore	Pts: Lojeski 17; Rebs: Hunter 7 Asts: Printezis, Spanoulis 3 PIR: Lojeski 19	Attendance: 12,987; Referees: Saša Pukl (SLO), Borys Ryzhyk (UKR), Ilija Belošević (SRB)

Real Madrid	Olympiacos

Starters:			Pts	Reb	Ast
PG	23	(Spain) Sergio Llull	12	0	4
SG	20	(Azerbaijan) Jaycee Carroll	16	3	0
SF	5	(Spain) Rudy Fernández	7	4	2
PF	9	(Spain) Felipe Reyes	2	1	1
C	14	(Mexico) Gustavo Ayón	2	5	1
Reserves:					
SG	4	(United States) K.C. Rivers	5	4	0
SF	6	(Argentina) Andrés Nocioni	12	7	2
PG	7	(Argentina) Facundo Campazzo	DNP		
SF	8	(Lithuania) Jonas Mačiulis	9	4	0
PG	13	(Spain) Sergio Rodríguez	11	3	4
PF	30	(Greece) Ioannis Bourousis	0	1	0
C	44	(United States) Marcus Slaughter	2	4	2
Head coach:
(Spanish Basketball Federation) Pablo Laso

Game rules
Game was played under FIBA rules.

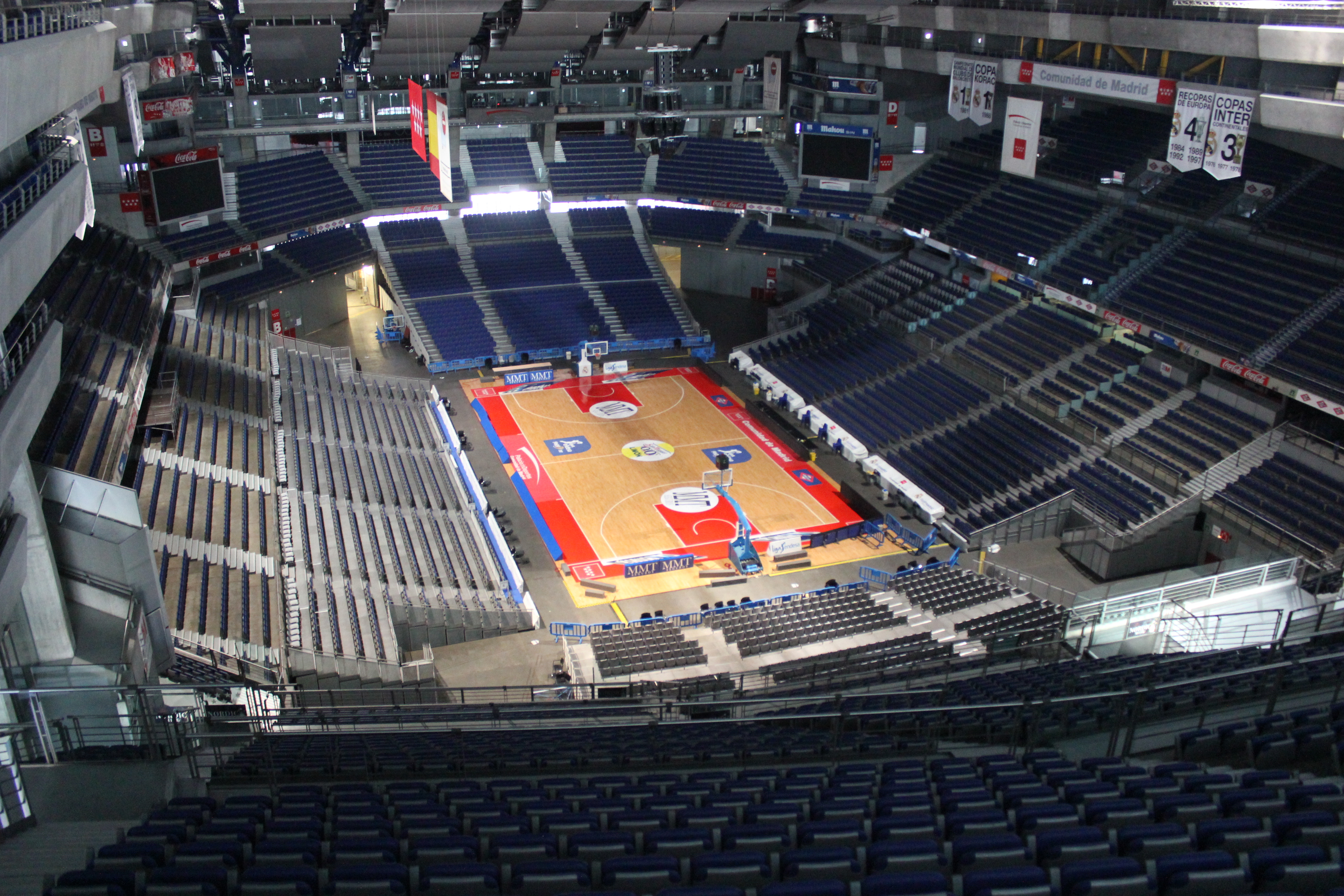
Barclaycard Center

2014–15 Euroleague
Champions
(Spain)
Real Madrid
9th title

Starters:			Pts	Reb	Ast
PG	17	(Greece) Vangelis Mantzaris	1	3	1
SG	7	(Greece) Vassilis Spanoulis	3	0	3
SF	21	(United States) Tremmell Darden	0	1	0
PF	15	(Greece) Giorgos Printezis	11	2	3
C	6	(Armenia) Bryant Dunston	4	1	2
Reserves:					
PF	4	(United States) Brent Petway	2	2	1
C	5	(United States) Othello Hunter	10	7	0
SF	9	(Greece) Ioannis Papapetrou	0	0	0
SG	10	(Greece) Kostas Sloukas	10	2	2
PF	19	(Greece) Dimitrios Agravanis	0	1	0
PG	20	(Croatia) Oliver Lafayette	1	1	2
SF	24	(Belgium) Matt Lojeski	17	2	1
Head coach:
(Hellenic Basketball Federation) Ioannis Sfairopoulos

- Team captains (C): (Spain) Felipe Reyes (Real Madrid and (Greece) Vassilis Spanoulis (Olympiacos)

== See also ==
- 2015 Eurocup Finals
- 2015 EuroChallenge Final Four
