= 2014–15 Euroleague Top 16 Group F =

== Standings ==
Pos	Team	Pld	W	L	PF	PA	PD	CSK	FBU	OLY	EFE	LBO	EA7	UNI	NIZ
1	(Russia) CSKA Moscow (A)	14	12	2	1227	1114	+113		75–81	76–70	88–83	99–90	97–75	101–74	103–95
2	(Turkey) Fenerbahçe Ülker (A)	14	11	3	1126	1033	+93	81–84		68–74	83–72	91–90	98–77	78–63	92–79
3	(Greece) Olympiacos (A)	14	10	4	1075	1007	+68	84–76	64–73		86–75	76–64	81–58	77–72	77–70
4	(Turkey) Anadolu Efes (A)	14	6 (Note: Tiebreaker: 1–1 (+2))	8	1102	1132	−30	69–78	71–77	84–70		84–87	86–78	74–70	79–75
5	(Spain) Laboral Kutxa (E)	14	6 (Note: Tiebreaker: 1–1 (–2))	8	1155	1164	−9	74–81	93–76	74–73	67–72		102–83	79–74	81–74
6	(Italy) EA7 Milano (E)	14	4 (Note: Tiebreaker: 2–0)	10	1083	1193	−110	79–88	71–82	74–83	71–73	99–85		90–86	59–79
7	(Spain) Unicaja (E)	14	4 (Note: Tiebreaker: 0–2)	10	1079	1140	−61	77–95	60–68	61–69	93–90	93–84	77–84		85–76
8	(Russia) Nizhny Novgorod (E)	14	3	11	1121	1185	−64	82–86	60–78	82–91	109–90	89–85	76–85	75–94	

(A) Advance to Playoffs; (E) Eliminated

== Fixtures and results ==
All times given below are in Central European Time.

=== Game 1 ===
2 January 2015
19:00

Report

Fenerbahçe Ülker (Turkey)	81–84 (OT)	(Russia) CSKA Moscow
Scoring by quarter: 25–28, 17–17, 17–16, 15–13, Overtime: 7–10
Pts: Goudelock 19; Rebs: Bjelica 11; Asts: Zisis 6		Pts: Hines, Weems 13; Rebs: Vorontsevich 10; Asts: Teodosić, Weems 6

Ülker Sports Arena, Istanbul
Attendance: 12,713
Referees: Dani Hierrezuelo (ESP), Miguel Perez Perez (ESP), Damir Javor (SLO)

2 January 2015
21:00

Report

Unicaja (Spain)	61–69	(Greece) Olympiacos
Scoring by quarter: 12–14, 17–18, 16–16, 16–21
Pts: Granger 15; Rebs: Vázquez 10; Asts: Granger, Kuzminskas 3		Pts: Hunter 18; Rebs: Hunter 7 Asts: Spanoulis 10

Martín Carpena, Málaga
Attendance: 8,496
Referees: Luigi Lamonica (ITA), Rustu Nuran (TUR), Sergiy Zashchuk (UKR)

2 January 2015
21:00

Report

EA7 Milano (Italy)	59–79	(Russia) Nizhny Novgorod
Scoring by quarter: 16–14, 19–17, 9–28, 15–20
Pts: Brooks 18; Rebs: James, Hackett 7 Asts: Hackett 6		Pts: Rochestie, Thompkins 19; Rebs: Thompkins 15; Asts: Rochestie 8

Mediolanum Forum, Milan
Attendance: 9,014
Referees: Matej Boltauzer (SLO), Elias Koromilas (GRE), Benjamin Jimenez (ESP)

2 January 2015
21:00

Report

Laboral Kutxa (Spain)	67–72	(Turkey) Anadolu Efes
Scoring by quarter: 24–16, 17–19, 17–20, 9–17
Pts: Begić 16; Rebs: Shengelia, Begić 7 Asts: Causeur, San Emeterio 3		Pts: Perperoglou 15; Rebs: Šarić 8 Asts: Osman, Korkmaz, Bjelica 3

Fernando Buesa Arena, Vitoria-Gasteiz
Attendance: 10,052
Referees: Fernando Rocha (POR), Robert Lottermoser (GER), Roberto Chiari (ITA)

=== Game 2 ===
8 January 2015
18:00

Report

CSKA Moscow (Russia)	99–90	(Spain) Laboral Kutxa
Scoring by quarter: 26–20, 27–16, 18–26, 28–28
Pts: Weems 22; Rebs: Weems 8 Asts: de Colo 8		Pts: James 19; Rebs: Begić 8 Asts: Causeur 6

Universal Sports Hall, Moscow
Attendance: 4,715
Referees: Sasa Pukl (SLO), Srdan Dozai (CRO), Ersan Kartal (TUR)

8 January 2015
21:00

Report

Olympiacos (Greece)	81–58	(Italy) EA7 Milano
Scoring by quarter: 13–18, 26–17, 17–9, 25–14
Pts: Lafayette, Petway 13; Rebs: Dunston, Lojeski 7 Asts: Sloukas 6		Pts: Gentile 12; Rebs: Melli 7 Asts: Hackett 5

Peace and Friendship Stadium, Piraeus
Attendance: 7,809
Referees: Ilija Belosevic (SRB), Eddie Viator (FRA), Carlos Cortes (ESP)

9 January 2015
17:30

Report

Nizhny Novgorod (Russia)	60–78	(Turkey) Fenerbahçe Ülker
Scoring by quarter: 19–20, 17–18, 15–22, 9–18
Pts: Kinsey 16; Rebs: Thompkins, Antonov 6 Asts: Khvostov 4		Pts: Goudelock 23; Rebs: Bjelica 10; Asts: Preldžić, Savaş 3

Trade Union Sport Palace, Nizhny Novgorod
Attendance: 3,393
Referees: Jose Ramon Garcia Ortiz (ESP), Robert Lottermoser (GER), Anastasios Piloidis (GRE)

9 January 2015
19:30

Report

Anadolu Efes (Turkey)	74–70	(Spain) Unicaja
Scoring by quarter: 15–23, 19–26, 23–8, 17–13
Pts: Janning 17; Rebs: Draper 5 Asts: Draper 6		Pts: Kuzminskas, Golubović 10; Rebs: Suárez, Vázquez 9 Asts: Toolson 6

Abdi İpekçi Arena, Istanbul
Attendance: 3,795
Referees: Christos Christodoulou (GRE), Carmelo Paternico (ITA), Piotr Pastusiak (POL)

=== Game 3 ===
15 January 2015
19:30

Report

Anadolu Efes (Turkey)	69–78	(Russia) CSKA Moscow
Scoring by quarter: 18–11, 14–23, 19–20, 18–24
Pts: Perperoglou 17; Rebs: Perperoglou 7 Asts: Heurtel 8		Pts: de Colo 22; Rebs: de Colo, Vorontsevich 7 Asts: Jackson, Teodosić 4

Abdi İpekçi Arena, Istanbul
Attendance: 8,004
Referees: Jose Ramon Garcia Ortiz (ESP), Nicola Maestre (FRA), Emilio Perez Pizarro (ESP)

16 January 2015
19:00

Report

Fenerbahçe Ülker (Turkey)	68–74	(Greece) Olympiacos
Scoring by quarter: 22–16, 14–27, 16–13, 16–18
Pts: Goudelock 23; Rebs: Bjelica 6 Asts: Zisis 4		Pts: Lojeski 18; Rebs: Lojeski 8 Asts: Spanoulis 6

Ülker Sports Arena, Istanbul
Attendance: 13,013
Referees: Borys Ryzhyk (UKR), Fernando Rocha (POR), Carlos Peruga (ESP)

16 January 2015
20:30

Report

Laboral Kutxa (Spain)	81–74	(Russia) Nizhny Novgorod
Scoring by quarter: 17–18, 14–17, 21–17, 29–22
Pts: James 14; Rebs: Iverson 10; Asts: Causeur 3		Pts: Rochestie 24; Rebs: Parakhouski 11; Asts: Rochestie 5

Fernando Buesa Arena, Vitoria-Gasteiz
Attendance: 8,926
Referees: Grzegorz Ziemblicki (POL), Rustu Nuran (TUR), Tomas Jasevicius (LTU)

16 January 2015
21:00

Report

Unicaja (Spain)	77–84	(Italy) EA7 Milano
Scoring by quarter: 17–22, 22–16, 22–27, 16–19
Pts: Granger, Toolson 13; Rebs: Suárez 10; Asts: Granger, Suárez 4		Pts: Gentile 20; Rebs: Hackett 7 Asts: Ragland 9

Martín Carpena, Málaga
Attendance: 6,750
Referees: Milivoje Jovcic (SRB), Panagiotis Anastopoulos (GRE), Milija Vojinovic (SRB)

=== Game 4 ===
22 January 2015
18:00

Report

CSKA Moscow (Russia)	101–74	(Spain) Unicaja
Scoring by quarter: 31–26, 23–15, 21–11, 26–22
Pts: de Colo 28; Rebs: Nichols, Kaun 5 Asts: Teodosić 14		Pts: Thomas, Kuzminskas 11; Rebs: Green 7 Asts: Four players 2

Universal Sports Hall, Moscow
Attendance: 4,697
Referees: Ilija Belosevic (SRB), Jakub Zamojski (POL), David Romano (ISR)

22 January 2015
20:45

Report

EA7 Milano (Italy)	71–82	(Turkey) Fenerbahçe Ülker
Scoring by quarter: 24–28, 14–15, 16–20, 17–19
Pts: Brooks 24; Rebs: Hackett 10; Asts: Brooks 3		Pts: Veselý 15; Rebs: Bjelica 9 Asts: Bogdanović 8

Mediolanum Forum, Milan
Attendance: 8,468
Referees: Christos Christodoulou (GRE), Joseph Bissang (FRA), Petros Papapetrou (GRE)

23 January 2015
17:30

Report

Nizhny Novgorod (Russia)	109–90	(Turkey) Anadolu Efes
Scoring by quarter: 31–21, 34–26, 23–24, 21–19
Pts: Parakhouski 27; Rebs: Thompkins 10; Asts: Rochestie 15		Pts: Bjelica 15; Rebs: Šarić 6 Asts: Heurtel 8

Trade Union Sport Palace, Nizhny Novgorod
Attendance: 1,825
Referees: Juan Carlos Garcia Gonzalez (ESP), Paolo Taurino (ITA), Marcin Kowalski (POL)

23 January 2015
20:30

Report

Olympiacos (Greece)	76–64	(Spain) Laboral Kutxa
Scoring by quarter: 17–18, 11–19, 26–16, 22–11
Pts: Spanoulis 27; Rebs: Hunter, Dunston 7 Asts: Spanoulis 6		Pts: Adams 12; Rebs: Begić 9 Asts: Adams 5

Peace and Friendship Stadium, Piraeus
Attendance: 8,540
Referees: Milivoje Jovcic (SRB), Tolga Sahin (ITA), Boris Shulga (UKR)

=== Game 5 ===
29 January 2015
18:00

Report

CSKA Moscow (Russia)	103–95 (OT)	(Russia) Nizhny Novgorod
Scoring by quarter: 24–19, 18–21, 27–22, 19–26, Overtime: 15–7
Pts: Teodosić 25; Rebs: Vorontsevich 9 Asts: Jackson 6		Pts: Rochestie, Thompkins 22; Rebs: Kinsey 10; Asts: Rochestie 9

Universal Sports Hall, Moscow
Attendance: 4,386
Referees: Dani Hierrezuelo (ESP), Andrej Jersan (SLO), Benjamin Jimenez (ESP)

29 January 2015
20:30

Report

Laboral Kutxa (Spain)	102–83	(Italy) EA7 Milano
Scoring by quarter: 34–18, 27–24, 23–19, 18–22
Pts: Bertāns 19; Rebs: Diop 7 Asts: James, Causeur 3		Pts: Samuels 18; Rebs: Kleiza, Samuels 8 Asts: Hackett 6

Fernando Buesa Arena, Vitoria-Gasteiz
Attendance: 9,486
Referees: Sreten Radovic (CRO), Jakub Zamojski (POL), Milos Koljensic (MNE)

29 January 2015
20:45

Report

Anadolu Efes (Turkey)	84–70	(Greece) Olympiacos
Scoring by quarter: 17–18, 20–22, 20–12, 27–18
Pts: Draper 14; Rebs: Lasme 6 Asts: Heurtel 6		Pts: Hunter 12; Rebs: Hunter 8 Asts: Lafayette 4

Abdi İpekçi Arena, Istanbul
Attendance: 7,341
Referees: Robert Lottermoser (GER), Antonio Conde (ESP), Olegs Latisevs (LAT)

30 January 2015
20:45

Report

Unicaja (Spain)	60–68	(Turkey) Fenerbahçe Ülker
Scoring by quarter: 19–16, 11–12, 10–21, 20–19
Pts: Stefansson 13; Rebs: Kuzminskas 9 Asts: Granger 4		Pts: Goudelock 20; Rebs: Bjelica 13; Asts: Preldžić, Zisis 4

Martín Carpena, Málaga
Attendance: 7,935
Referees: Sasa Pukl (SLO), Spiros Gkontas (GRE), Tomas Jasevicius (LTU)

=== Game 6 ===
5 February 2015
20:45

Report

Olympiacos (Greece)	84–76	(Russia) CSKA Moscow
Scoring by quarter: 11–17, 32–20, 21–16, 20–23
Pts: Spanoulis 19; Rebs: Dunston 11; Asts: Lafayette 6		Pts: Teodosić 20; Rebs: Vorontsevich 6 Asts: De Colo, Teodosić 4

Peace and Friendship Stadium, Piraeus
Attendance: 11,609
Referees: Sasa Pukl (SLO), Carmelo Paternico (ITA), Milija Vojinovic (SRB)

6 February 2015
19:00

Report

Fenerbahçe Ülker (Turkey)	91–90	(Spain) Laboral Kutxa
Scoring by quarter: 20–21, 25–22, 26–22, 20–25
Pts: Goudelock 19; Rebs: Bjelica 15; Asts: Preldžić, Zisis 4		Pts: San Emeterio 15; Rebs: Bertāns, Tillie 5 Asts: Adams 6

Ülker Sports Arena, Istanbul
Attendance: 12,899
Referees: Robert Lottermoser (GER), Srdan Dozai (CRO), Panagiotis Anastopoulos (GRE)

6 February 2015
21:00

Report

Unicaja (Spain)	85–76	(Russia) Nizhny Novgorod
Scoring by quarter: 22–23, 24–18, 18–16, 21–19
Pts: Granger 29; Rebs: Green, Vázquez 8 Asts: Granger 5		Pts: Thompkins 27; Rebs: Thompkins 13; Asts: Rochestie 6

Martín Carpena, Málaga
Attendance: 7,693
Referees: Borys Ryzhyk (UKR), Damir Javor (SLO), Ersan Kartal (TUR)

6 February 2015
21:00

Report

EA7 Milano (Italy)	71–73	(Turkey) Anadolu Efes
Scoring by quarter: 17–20, 19–14, 18–20, 17–19
Pts: Brooks, Hackett 18; Rebs: Hackett, Samuels 7 Asts: Brooks, Hackett 3		Pts: Perperoglou 18; Rebs: Šarić 7 Asts: Janning 4

Mediolanum Forum, Milan
Attendance: 9,576
Referees: Dani Hierrenzuelo (ESP), Elias Koromilas (GRE), Sergiy Zashchuk (UKR)

=== Game 7 ===
12 February 2015
17:30

Report

Nizhny Novgorod (Russia)	82–91	(Greece) Olympiacos
Scoring by quarter: 24–24, 18–17, 24–22, 16–28
Pts: Parakhouski 25; Rebs: Parakhouski 11; Asts: Khvostov 6		Pts: Printezis 20; Rebs: Hunter, Petway 6 Asts: Spanoulis 6

Trade Union Sport Palace, Nizhny Novgorod
Attendance: 3,188
Referees: Ilija Belosevic (SRB), Emilio Perez Pizarro (ESP), Milos Koljensic (MNE)

13 February 2015
18:00

Report

CSKA Moscow (Russia)	97–75	(Italy) EA7 Milano
Scoring by quarter: 29–15, 25–23, 19–22, 24–15
Pts: Teodosić 19; Rebs: Fridzon 9 Asts: De Colo 7		Pts: Brooks 24; Rebs: Melli 6 Asts: Cerella, Ragland 3

Universal Sports Hall, Moscow
Attendance: 4,779
Referees: Milivoje Jovcic (SRB), Antonio Conde (ESP), Olegs Latisevs (LAT)

13 February 2015
19:15

Report

Anadolu Efes (Turkey)	71–77	(Turkey) Fenerbahçe Ülker
Scoring by quarter: 11-13, 22-23, 20-18, 18-23
Pts: Heurtel 17; Rebs: Perperoglou 5 Asts: Heurtel 5		Pts: Bjelica, Veselý 14; Rebs: Bjelica 7 Asts: Preldžić 8

Abdi İpekçi Arena, Istanbul
Attendance: 10,174
Referees: Borys Ryzhyk (UKR), Jakub Zamojski (POL), Benjamin Jimenez (ESP)

13 February 2015
20:30

Report

Laboral Kutxa (Spain)	79–74	(Spain) Unicaja
Scoring by quarter: 27–21, 17–20, 21–17, 14–16
Pts: Adams 20; Rebs: four players 4 Asts: Adams 4		Pts: Kuzminskas 12; Rebs: Kuzminskas 7 Asts: Granger, Marković 4

Fernando Buesa Arena, Vitoria-Gasteiz
Attendance: 9,287
Referees: Fernando Rocha (POR), Matej Boltauzer (SLO), Elias Koromilas (GRE)

=== Game 8 ===
26 February 2015
18:00

Report

Nizhny Novgorod (Russia)	76–85	(Italy) EA7 Milano
Scoring by quarter: 18–27, 22–23, 16–14, 20–21
Pts: Rochestie 21; Rebs: Thompkins 9 Asts: Rochestie 6		Pts: Samuels 36; Rebs: Samuels 9 Asts: Hackett 9

Trade Union Sport Palace, Nizhny Novgorod
Attendance: 2,251
Referees: Christos Christodoulou (GRE), Marek Cmikiewicz (POL), David Romano (ESP)

27 February 2015
18:00

Report

CSKA Moscow (Russia)	75–81	(Turkey) Fenerbahçe Ülker
Scoring by quarter: 10–17, 27–22, 21–20, 17–22
Pts: De Colo 18; Rebs: Hines 5 Asts: Teodosić, Weems 6		Pts: Goudelock, Veselý 14; Rebs: Bjelica 13; Asts: Goudelock, Preldžić 3

Universal Sports Hall, Moscow
Attendance: 5,000
Referees: Luigi Lamonica (ITA), Miguel Perez Perez (ESP), Elias Koromilas (GRE)

27 February 2015
20:00

Report

Anadolu Efes (Turkey)	84–87	(Spain) Laboral Kutxa
Scoring by quarter: 13–25, 20–25, 30–15, 21–22
Pts: Šarić 18; Rebs: Krstić 12; Asts: Draper 6		Pts: San Emeterio 22; Rebs: Iverson 11; Asts: Adams, Hansbrough 3

Abdi İpekçi Arena, Istanbul
Attendance: 4,748
Referees: Grzegorz Ziemblicki (POL), Spiros Gkontas (GRE), Damir Javor (SLO)

27 February 2015
20:45

Report

Olympiacos (Greece)	77–72	(Spain) Unicaja
Scoring by quarter: 11–17, 18–16, 26–19, 22–20
Pts: Spanoulis 18; Rebs: Dunston 9 Asts: Spanoulis 10		Pts: Granger 13; Rebs: Thomas 8 Asts: Granger 5

Peace and Friendship Stadium, Piraeus
Attendance: 8,743
Referees: Recep Ankarali (TUR), Milivoje Jovcic (SRB), Paolo Taurino (ITA)

=== Game 9 ===
5 March 2015
19:00

Report

Fenerbahçe Ülker (Turkey)	92–79	(Russia) Nizhny Novgorod
Scoring by quarter: 18–17, 32–17, 12–21, 30–24
Pts: Bjelica 16; Rebs: Bjelica 7 Asts: Zisis 7		Pts: Thompkins 22; Rebs: Thompkins 11; Asts: Mekel 6

Ülker Sports Arena, Istanbul
Attendance: 10,233
Referees: Matej Boltauzer (SLO), Paolo Taurino (ITA), Spiros Gkontas (GRE)

5 March 2015
20:45

Report

Laboral Kutxa (Spain)	74–81	(Russia) CSKA Moscow
Scoring by quarter: 27–15, 15–21, 13–20, 19–25
Pts: Adams 31; Rebs: Causeur 10; Asts: Causeur 3		Pts: Fridzon 13; Rebs: Vorontsevich 13; Asts: Teodosić 8

Fernando Buesa Arena, Vitoria-Gasteiz
Attendance: 12,619
Referees: Sreten Radovic (CRO), Tolga Sahin (ITA), Aare Halliko (EST)

6 March 2015
20:45

Report

EA7 Milano (Italy)	74–83	(Greece) Olympiacos
Scoring by quarter: 12–22, 20–20, 24–24, 18–17
Pts: Gentile 24; Rebs: Kleiza 7 Asts: Ragland, Gentile 3		Pts: Hunter, Spanoulis 14; Rebs: Printezis 7 Asts: Spanoulis 8

Mediolanum Forum, Milan
Attendance: 8,179
Referees: Robert Lottermoser (GER), Jose Ramon Garcia Ortiz (ESP), Carlos Peruga (ESP)

6 March 2015
21:00

Report

Unicaja (Spain)	93–90	(Turkey) Anadolu Efes
Scoring by quarter: 22–15, 30–25, 11–20, 30–30
Pts: Toolson 25; Rebs: Gabriel 9 Asts: Granger 5		Pts: Heurtel 23; Rebs: Krstić 9 Asts: Heurtel 5

Martín Carpena, Málaga
Attendance: 7,742
Referees: Ilija Belosevic (SRB), Roberto Chiari (ITA), Jurgis Laurinavicius (LTU)

=== Game 10 ===
12 March 2015
18:00

Report

Nizhny Novgorod (Russia)	89–85	(Spain) Laboral Kutxa
Scoring by quarter: 19–25, 22–18, 16–22, 32–20
Pts: Thompkins 22; Rebs: Thompkins 10; Asts: Rochestie 9		Pts: Bertāns 21; Rebs: Iverson 11; Asts: Adams 4

Trade Union Sport Palace, Nizhny Novgorod
Attendance: 1,492
Referees: Luigi Lamonica (ITA), Ersan Kartal (TUR), Piotr Pastusiak (POL)

13 March 2015
18:00

Report

CSKA Moscow (Russia)	88–83	(Turkey) Anadolu Efes
Scoring by quarter: 21–27, 22–12, 23–18, 22–26
Pts: Teodosić 20; Rebs: Vorontsevich 9 Asts: Teodosić 9		Pts: Perperoglou, Draper 14; Rebs: Šarić 9 Asts: Heurtel 9

Universal Sports Hall, Moscow
Attendance: 4,711
Referees: Fernando Rocha (POR), Matej Boltauzer (SLO), Carlos Peruga (ESP)

13 March 2015
20:45

Report

EA7 Milano (Italy)	90–86	(Spain) Unicaja
Scoring by quarter: 21–22, 22–23, 24–15, 23–26
Pts: Gentile 23; Rebs: Samuels 7 Asts: Hackett 6		Pts: Green 22; Rebs: Granger 6 Asts: Granger 9

Mediolanum Forum, Milan
Attendance: 8,907
Referees: Sasa Pukl (SLO), Rustu Nuran (TUR), Ioannis Foufis (GRE)

13 March 2015
20:45

Report

Olympiacos (Greece)	64–73	(Turkey) Fenerbahçe Ülker
Scoring by quarter: 19–19, 16–20, 15–16, 14–18
Pts: Lafayette 14; Rebs: Dunston 5 Asts: Spanoulis 10		Pts: Goudelock 24; Rebs: Bjelica 9 Asts: Zisis 4

Peace and Friendship Stadium, Piraeus
Attendance: 11,653
Referees: Dani Hierrezuelo (ESP), Olegs Latisevs (LAT), Carlos Cortes (ESP)

=== Game 11 ===
19 March 2015
19:00

Report

Anadolu Efes (Turkey)	79–75	(Russia) Nizhny Novgorod
Scoring by quarter: 24–21, 24–18, 16–13, 15–23
Pts: Bjelica 15; Rebs: Heurtel 7 Asts: Heurtel 9		Pts: Parakhouski 22; Rebs: Parakhouski 7 Asts: Mekel 4

Abdi İpekçi Arena, Istanbul
Attendance: 3,562
Referees: Sasa Pukl (SLO), Robert Lottermoser (GER), Panagiotis Anastopoulos (GRE)

19 March 2015
21:15

Report

Unicaja (Spain)	77–95	(Russia) CSKA Moscow
Scoring by quarter: 25–26, 17–21, 14–25, 21–23
Pts: Vázquez 14; Rebs: Vázquez 7 Asts: Marković 10		Pts: Teodosić 25; Rebs: Nichols 6 Asts: Teodosić 8

Martín Carpena, Málaga
Attendance: 8,891
Referees: Christos Christodoulou (GRE), Joseph Bissang (FRA), Milos Koljensic (MNE)

20 March 2015
19:00

Report

Fenerbahçe Ülker (Turkey)	98–77	(Italy) EA7 Milano
Scoring by quarter: 22–14, 20–31, 23–16, 33–16
Pts: Bogdanović 25; Rebs: Bjelica, Veselý 9 Asts: Bjelica 6		Pts: Brooks 21; Rebs: Kleiza, Samuels 4 Asts: Brooks 5

Ülker Sports Arena, Istanbul
Attendance: 12,850
Referees: Sreten Radovic (CRO), Antonio Conde (ESP), Tomas Jasevicius (LTU)

20 March 2015
21:00

Report

Laboral Kutxa (Spain)	74–73	(Greece) Olympiacos
Scoring by quarter: 19–23, 17–15, 17–17, 21–18
Pts: James 17; Rebs: James 6 Asts: Adams, Causeur 3		Pts: Printezis 15; Rebs: Printezis 7 Asts: Sloukas 5

Fernando Buesa Arena, Vitoria-Gasteiz
Attendance: 11,953
Referees: Borys Ryzhyk (UKR), Carmelo Paternico (ITA), Boris Shulga (UKR)

=== Game 12 ===
26 March 2015
19:00

Report

Fenerbahçe Ülker (Turkey)	78–63	(Spain) Unicaja
Scoring by quarter: 19–21, 20–12, 24–12, 15–18
Pts: Goudelock 22; Rebs: Bjelica 11; Asts: Zisis 5		Pts: Toolson 14; Rebs: Thomas 7 Asts: Marković 4

Ülker Sports Arena, Istanbul
Attendance: 11,200
Referees: Robert Lottermoser (GER), Marek Cmikiewicz (POL), Petros Papapetou (GRE)

26 March 2015
20:45

Report

Olympiacos (Greece)	86–75	(Turkey) Anadolu Efes
Scoring by quarter: 17–16, 18–19, 18–22, 33–18
Pts: Lafayette 17; Rebs: Printezis 12; Asts: Mantzaris 7		Pts: Perperoglou 23; Rebs: Šarić 10; Asts: Heurtel 7

Peace and Friendship Stadium, Piraeus
Attendance: 9,524
Referees: Eddie Viator (FRA), Jakub Zamojski (POL), Benjamin Jimenez (ESP)

26 March 2015
21:00

Report

EA7 Milano (Italy)	99–85	(Spain) Laboral Kutxa
Scoring by quarter: 20–25, 19–18, 35–17, 25–25
Pts: Gentile 29; Rebs: Gentile, Samuels 7 Asts: Gentile, Hackett 4		Pts: Adams 18; Rebs: Begić 11; Asts: San Emeterio 3

Mediolanum Forum, Milan
Attendance: 7,489
Referees: Milivoje Jovcic (SRB), Olegs Latisevs (LAT), Anastasios Piloidis (GRE)

27 March 2015
17:30

Report

Nizhny Novgorod (Russia)	82–86	(Russia) CSKA Moscow
Scoring by quarter: 26–26, 29–16, 7–25, 20–19
Pts: Rochestie 21; Rebs: Thompkins 9 Asts: Rochestie 6		Pts: Weems 21; Rebs: Vorontsevich 11; Asts: De Colo, Teodosić, Jackson 4

Trade Union Sport Palace, Nizhny Novgorod
Attendance: 3,206
Referees: Juan Carlos Garcia Gonzalez (ESP), Rustu Nuran (TUR), Carlos Cortes (ESP)

=== Game 13 ===
2 April 2015
19:00

Report

Nizhny Novgorod (Russia)	75–94	(Spain) Unicaja
Scoring by quarter: 18–29, 24–21, 13–31, 20–13
Pts: Rochestie 14; Rebs: Thompkins 6 Asts: Mekel, Khvostov, Rochestie 3		Pts: Kuzminskas 18; Rebs: Golubović 9 Asts: Marković 8

Trade Union Sport Palace, Nizhny Novgorod
Attendance: 1,599
Referees: Spiros Gkontas (GRE), Jakub Zamojski (POL), Elias Koromilas (GRE)

2 April 2015
21:00

Report

Laboral Kutxa (Spain)	93–76	(Turkey) Fenerbahçe Ülker
Scoring by quarter: 21–14, 21–15, 19–18, 32–29
Pts: James 19; Rebs: Iverson 8 Asts: San Emeterio 5		Pts: Bjelica 17; Rebs: Bjelica 10; Asts: Goudelock, Zisis 4

Fernando Buesa Arena, Vitoria-Gasteiz
Attendance: 10,536
Referees: Fernando Rocha (POR), Matej Boltauzer (SLO), Roberto Chiari (ITA)

3 April 2015
19:00

Report

CSKA Moscow (Russia)	76–70	(Greece) Olympiacos
Scoring by quarter: 21–17, 18–17, 12–15, 25–21
Pts: Weems, Kaun 16; Rebs: Kirilenko 9 Asts: Teodosić 7		Pts: Printezis, Lojeski 16; Rebs: Lojeski 6 Asts: Lafayette 5

Universal Sports Hall, Moscow
Attendance: 5,349
Referees: Sasa Pukl (SLO), Recep Ankarali (TUR), Milija Vojinovic (SRB)

3 April 2015
19:00

Report

Anadolu Efes (Turkey)	86–78	(Italy) EA7 Milano
Scoring by quarter: 13–24, 23–18, 27–17, 23–19
Pts: Heurtel 26; Rebs: Osman, Perperoglou 8 Asts: Draper, Heurtel 5		Pts: Brooks, Gentile 17; Rebs: Elegar 9 Asts: Hackett 8

Abdi İpekçi Arena, Istanbul
Attendance: 5,781
Referees: Christos Christodoulou (GRE), Boris Shulga (UKR), Piotr Pastusiak (POL)

=== Game 14 ===
9 April 2015
19:00

Report

Fenerbahçe Ülker (Turkey)	83–72	(Turkey) Anadolu Efes
Scoring by quarter: 23–12, 18–21, 18–22, 24–17
Pts: Goudelock 24; Rebs: Bjelica 11; Asts: Preldžić 4		Pts: Batuk 12; Rebs: Šarić, Krstić 7 Asts: Heurtel 8

Ülker Sports Arena, Istanbul
Attendance: 11,753 (Tentative)
Referees: Luigi Lamonica (ITA), Elias Koromilas (GRE), Damir Javor (SLO)

9 April 2015
20:45

Report

Unicaja (Spain)	93–84	(Spain) Laboral Kutxa
Scoring by quarter: 20–16, 23–20, 27–23, 23–25
Pts: Toolson 17; Rebs: Thomas, Vázquez 5 Asts: Granger 6		Pts: Causeur 21; Rebs: Iverson, San Emeterio 8 Asts: James, San Emeterio 5

Martín Carpena, Málaga
Attendance: 5,237 (Tentative)
Referees: Sasa Pukl (SLO), Tolga Sahin (ITA), Ioannis Foufis (GRE)

9 April 2015
20:45

Report

EA7 Milano (Italy)	79–88	(Russia) CSKA Moscow
Scoring by quarter: 15–23, 19–32, 21–18, 24–15
Pts: Samuels 18; Rebs: Gentile, Samuels 6 Asts: Hackett 4		Pts: Kaun 19; Rebs: Kaun 8 Asts: Teodosić 8

Mediolanum Forum, Milan
Attendance: 7,500 (Tentative)
Referees: Miguel Perez Perez (ESP), Srdan Dozai (CRO), Benjamin Jimenez (ESP)

10 April 2015
17:00

Report

Olympiacos (Greece)	77–70	(Russia) Nizhny Novgorod
Scoring by quarter: 25–18, 15–12, 16–26, 21–14
Pts: Lojeski 17; Rebs: Lojeski 8 Asts: Mantzaris 6		Pts: Kuksiks 17; Rebs: Parakhouski 6 Asts: Mekel 7

Peace and Friendship Stadium, Piraeus
Attendance: 4,000 (Tentative)
Referees: Paolo Taurino (ITA), Antonio Conde (ESP), Milos Koljensic (MNE)

== Statistics ==
	(Turkey) Anadolu Efes	(Russia) CSKA Moscow	(Italy) EA7 Milano	(Turkey) Fenerbahçe Ülker	(Spain) Laboral Kutxa	(Russia) Nizhny Novgorod	(Greece) Olympiacos	(Spain) Unicaja
PPG	(Greece) Stratos Perperoglou (12.2)	(Serbia) Miloš Teodosić (15.6)	(Italy) Alessandro Gentile (17.9)	(United States) Andrew Goudelock (16.6)	(United States) Darius Adams (12.2)	(Montenegro) Taylor Rochestie (18.2)	(Greece) Vassilis Spanoulis (13.4)	(Uruguay) Jayson Granger (11.8)
RPG	(Croatia) Dario Šarić (5.4)	(Russia) Andrey Vorontsevich (6.5)	(Jamaica) Samardo Samuels (5.2)	(Serbia) Nemanja Bjelica (10.1)	(United States) Colton Iverson (6.1)	(United States) Trey Thompkins (8.8)	(United States) Bryant Dunston & (Greece) Georgios Printezis (4.9)	(Lithuania) Mindaugas Kuzminskas & (Spain) Fran Vázquez (5.1)
APG	(France) Thomas Heurtel (5.5)	(Serbia) Miloš Teodosić (6.7)	(Italy) Daniel Hackett (4.4)	(Greece) Nikolaos Zisis (3.5)	(United States) Darius Adams (2.8)	(Montenegro) Taylor Rochestie (5.8)	(Greece) Vassilis Spanoulis (6.6)	(Uruguay) Jayson Granger (4.2)
