= 2014–15 Euroleague Regular Season Group A =

Standings and Results for Group A of the Regular Season phase of the 2014–15 Euroleague basketball tournament.

== Standings ==
Pos	Team	Pld	W	L	PF	PA	PD	RMD	EFE	ŽAL	NIZ	UNI	DIN
1	(Spain) Real Madrid (A)	10	8	2	873	775	+98		90–70	80–71	112–83	75–85	115–94
2	(Turkey) Anadolu Efes (A)	10	6	4	723	696	+27	75–73		62–65	61–65	82–76	85–62
3	(Lithuania) Žalgiris (A)	10	5 (Note: Tie breaker: 3–1)	5	714	709	+5	66–68	57–66		97–63	77–71	80–79
4	(Russia) Nizhny Novgorod (A)	10	5 (Note: Tie breaker: 2–2)	5	764	823	−59	98–101	66–76	55–61		78–74	88–86
5	(Russia) UNICS (E)	10	5 (Note: Tie breaker: 1–3)	5	751	721	+30	75–76	67–64	73–60	73–79		85–62
6	(Italy) Dinamo Sassari (E)	10	1	9	758	859	−101	58–83	75–82	92–80	82–89	68–72	

(A) Advance to Top 16; (E) Enter 2014–15 Eurocup Basketball last 32 round

== Fixtures and results ==
All times given below are in Central European Time.

=== Game 1 ===
16 October 2014
19:00

Report

Anadolu Efes (Turkey)	82–76	(Russia) UNICS Kazan
Scoring by quarter: 20–19, 25–15, 19–18, 18–24
Pts: Draper 16; Rebs: Perperoglou 7 Asts: Draper 4		Pts: Langford 19; Rebs: White 10; Asts: Jerrells 4

Abdi İpekçi Arena, Istanbul
Attendance: 2,529
Referees: Juan Carlos Garcia Gonzalez (ESP), Anastasios Piloidis (GRE), Carlos Cortes (ESP)

17 October 2014
18:00

Report

Nizhny Novgorod (Russia)	88–86	(Italy) Dinamo Sassari
Scoring by quarter: 15–26, 28–21, 23–14, 22–25
Pts: Kinsey 17; Rebs: Parakhouski 8 Asts: Rochestie 5		Pts: Logan, Dyson 17; Rebs: Todić 7 Asts: Logan, Sosa 5

Trade Union Sport Palace, Nizhny Novgorod
Attendance: 1,503
Referees: Recep Ankarali (TUR), Milija Vojinovic (SRB), Piotr Pastusiak (POL)

17 October 2014
19:30

Report

Real Madrid (Spain)	80–71	(Lithuania) Žalgiris
Scoring by quarter: 13–14, 19–21, 24–14, 24–22
Pts: Reyes 11; Rebs: Bourousis 8 Asts: Ayón 4		Pts: Anderson 19; Rebs: Gudaitis 8 Asts: Lekavičius 5

Palacio de Deportes, Madrid
Attendance: 10,624
Referees: Fernando Rocha (POR), Srdan Dozai (CRO), Tomasz Trawicki (POL)

=== Game 2 ===
24 October 2014
17:00

Report

UNICS Kazan (Russia)	75–76	(Spain) Real Madrid
Scoring by quarter: 16–19, 15–16, 25–20, 19–21
Pts: Langford 23; Rebs: Kaimakoglou 11; Asts: Kaimakoglou 5		Pts: Fernández, Ayón 10; Rebs: Reyes 8 Asts: Llull 6

Basket-Hall Arena, Kazan
Attendance: 3,628
Referees: Luigi Lamonica (ITA), Murat Biricik (TUR), Saso Petek (SLO)

24 October 2014
18:45

Report

Žalgiris (Lithuania)	97–63	(Russia) Nizhny Novgorod
Scoring by quarter: 23–17, 25–7, 27–18, 22–21
Pts: Jankūnas 13; Rebs: Gudaitis 7 Asts: Four player 3		Pts: Rochestie 16; Rebs: Baburin 7 Asts: Khvostov 4

Žalgiris Arena, Kaunas
Attendance: 8,670
Referees: Robert Lottermoser (GER), Nuran Rustu (TUR), Tomislav Hordov (CRO)

24 October 2014
20:45

Report

Dinamo Sassari (Italy)	75–82	(Turkey) Anadolu Efes
Scoring by quarter: 16–24, 24–23, 16–16, 19–19
Pts: Dyson 21; Rebs: Brooks 9 Asts: Three players 3		Pts: Krstić 15; Rebs: Lasme 7 Asts: Draper 7

Palasport Roberta Serradimigni, Sassari
Attendance: 3,610
Referees: Miguel Perez Perez (ESP), Nicola Maestre (FRA), Benjamin Jimenez (ESP)

=== Game 3 ===
30 October 2014
17:00

Report

UNICS Kazan (Russia)	85–62	(Italy) Dinamo Sassari
Scoring by quarter: 21-17, 14-20, 31-17, 19-8
Pts: Fischer 14; Rebs: Fischer 9 Asts: Kaimakoglou 8		Pts: Sanders 18; Rebs: Brooks 9 Asts: Sosa 5

Basket-Hall Arena, Kazan
Attendance: 534
Referees: Matej Boltauzer (SLO), Apostlos Kalpaks (SWE), Rutesic Zdravok (MNE)

30 October 2014
18:30

Report

Anadolu Efes (Turkey)	62–65	(Lithuania) Žalgiris
Scoring by quarter: 12-16, 14-18, 16-16, 20-15
Pts: Krstić 22; Rebs: Lasme 6 Asts: Draper 4		Pts: Ulanovas 19; Rebs: Jankūnas 7 Asts: Milaknis, Anderson 2

Abdi İpekçi Arena, Istanbul
Attendance: 3,138
Referees: Pizarro Perez (ESP), Joseph Bissang (FRA), Sasa Maricic (SRB)

30 October 2014
22:00

Report

Real Madrid (Spain)	112–83	(Russia) Nizhny Novgorod
Scoring by quarter: 26-18, 32-28, 24-17, 30-20
Pts: Carroll 32; Rebs: Ayón 7 Asts: Rodríguez 9		Pts: Rochestie 23; Rebs: Thompkins 9 Asts: Rochestie 8

Palacio de Deportes de la Comunidad de Madrid, Madrid
Attendance: 10,205
Referees: Christos Christodolou (GRE), Paolo Tarino (ITA), Igor Dragojevic (MNE)

=== Game 4 ===
5 November 2014
20:45

Report

Real Madrid (Spain)	115–94	(Italy) Dinamo Sassari
Scoring by quarter: 28-17, 30-25, 27-22, 31-30
Pts: Reyes 17; Rebs: Nocioni 6 Asts: Rodríguez 12		Pts: Todić 20; Rebs: Lawal 13; Asts: Sosa, Dyson 6

Palacio de Deportes de la Comunidad de Madrid, Madrid
Attendance: 10,576
Referees: Ilija Belosevic (SRB), Sinisa Herceg (CRO), Joseph Bissang (FRA)

5 November 2014
17:00

Report

Nizhny Novgorod (Russia)	66–76	(Turkey) Anadolu Efes
Scoring by quarter: 15-21, 9-21, 21-23, 21-11
Pts: Rochestie 19; Rebs: Thompkins 10; Asts: Rochestie 5		Pts: Šarić 18; Rebs: Korkmaz 7 Asts: Draper 5

Trade Union Sport Palace, Nizhny Novgorod
Attendance: 1,601
Referees: Jose Ramon Garcia Ortiz (ESP), Olegs Latisevs (LAT), Damir Javor (SLO)

5 November 2014
18:45

Report

Žalgiris (Lithuania)	77–71	(Russia) UNICS Kazan
Scoring by quarter: 17-17, 23-20, 22-18, 15-16
Pts: Anderson 27; Rebs: Anderson 11; Asts: Anderson 4		Pts: Langford 24; Rebs: White, Kaimakoglou 6 Asts: Zisis, Fischer 3

Kaunas Sports Hall, Kaunas
Attendance: 4,795
Referees: Recep Ankarali (TUR), Antonio Conde (ESP), Milos Koljensic (MNE)

=== Game 5 ===
13 November 2014
17:00

Report

UNICS Kazan (Russia)	73–79	(Russia) Nizhny Novgorod
Scoring by quarter: 16–21, 18–18, 14–15, 25–25
Pts: Zisis 15; Rebs: White 8 Asts: Zisis 5		Pts: Rochestie 24; Rebs: Parakhouski 9 Asts: Khvostov 8

Basket-Hall Arena, Kazan
Attendance: 2,836
Referees: Grzegorz Ziemblicki (POL), David Romano (ISR), Mario Majkic (SLO)

14 November 2014
19:00

Report

Anadolu Efes (Turkey)	75–73	(Spain) Real Madrid
Scoring by quarter: 18–18, 21–18, 21–21, 15–16
Pts: Osman 16; Rebs: Osman, Lasme 7 Asts: Draper 6		Pts: Llull 20; Rebs: Reyes 7 Asts: Rivers 6

Abdi İpekçi Arena, Istanbul
Attendance: 8,656
Referees: Borys Ryzhyk (UKR), Elias Koromilas (GRE), Carmelo Paternico (ITA)

14 November 2014
20:30

Report

Dinamo Sassari (Italy)	92–80	(Lithuania) Žalgiris
Scoring by quarter: 17–26, 25–15, 18–23, 32–16
Pts: Lawal 25; Rebs: Lawal 9 Asts: Dyson 4		Pts: Anderson 15; Rebs: Gudaitis 8 Asts: Javtokas 4

Palasport Roberta Serradimigni, Sassari
Attendance: 3,739
Referees: Vicente Bulto (ESP), Seffi Shemmesh (ISR), Petar Obradovic (BIH)

=== Game 6 ===
20 November 2014
16:30

Report

UNICS Kazan (Russia)	67–64	(Turkey) Anadolu Efes
Scoring by quarter: 14–18, 14–16, 15–19, 24–11
Pts: Langford 19; Rebs: Fischer 9 Asts: Zisis 4		Pts: Šarić 13; Rebs: Šarić 9 Asts: Lasme 4

Basket-Hall Arena, Kazan
Attendance: 3,614
Referees: Dani Hierrezuelo (ESP), Marcin Kowalski (POL), Arnis Ozols (LAT)

21 November 2014
18:45

Report

Žalgiris (Lithuania)	66–68	(Spain) Real Madrid
Scoring by quarter: 14-24, 24-14, 19-15, 9-15
Pts: Anderson 21; Rebs: Anderson 9 Asts: Anderson, Lekavičius 3		Pts: Rodríguez 14; Rebs: Bourousis 9 Asts: Rodríguez 7

Žalgiris Arena, Kaunas
Attendance: 14,382
Referees: Matej Boltauzer (SLO), Nicola Maestre (FRA), Panagiotis Anastopoulos (GRE)

21 November 2014
20:30

Report

Dinamo Sassari (Italy)	82–89	(Russia) Nizhny Novgorod
Scoring by quarter: 25-30, 21-23, 19-10, 17-26
Pts: Sanders 17; Rebs: Lawal 10; Asts: Logan		Pts: Rochestie 29; Rebs: Thompkins 15; Asts: Rochestie 7

Palasport Roberta Serradimigni, Sassari
Attendance: 4,001
Referees: Juan Carlos Garcia Gonzales (ESP), Sergiy Chebyshev (UKR), Gentian Cici (ALB)

=== Game 7 ===
27 November 2014
20:45

Report

Real Madrid (Spain)	75–85	(Russia) UNICS Kazan
Scoring by quarter: 22–23, 24–19, 15–26, 14–17
Pts: Rodríguez 12; Rebs: Reyes 9 Asts: Llull 7		Pts: Fischer 25; Rebs: Fischer, Jerrells 8 Asts: Zisis 7

Palacio de Deportes, Madrid
Attendance: 10,873
Referees: Eddie Viator (FRA), Roberto Chiari (ITA), Milija Vojinovic (SRB)

28 November 2014
18:00

Report

Nizhny Novgorod (Russia)	55–61	(Lithuania) Žalgiris
Scoring by quarter: 13–11, 24–12, 7–20, 11–18
Pts: Rochestie 15; Rebs: Parakhouski 13; Asts: Rochestie 7		Pts: Anderson 18; Rebs: Jankūnas, Javtokas 11; Asts: Kariniauskas 4

Trade Union Sport Palace, Nizhny Novgorod
Attendance: 2,145
Referees: Miguel Perez Perez (ESP), Murat Biricik (TUR), Marko Juras (SRB)

28 November 2014
18:45

Report

Anadolu Efes (Turkey)	85–62	(Italy) Dinamo Sassari
Scoring by quarter: 20–12, 23–21, 21–16, 21–13
Pts: Šarić 18; Rebs: Šarić 11; Asts: Draper, Korkmaz 4		Pts: Sanders 11; Rebs: Lawal 15; Asts: Brooks 3

Abdi İpekçi Arena, Istanbul
Attendance: 4,122
Referees: Miguel Perez Perez (ESP), Tomas Jasevicius (LTU), David Romano (ISR)

=== Game 8 ===
4 December 2014
18:00

Report

Nizhny Novgorod (Russia)	98–101	(Spain) Real Madrid
Scoring by quarter: 23–20, 21–21, 25–27, 29–33
Pts: Rochestie 22; Rebs: Thompkins 8 Asts: Rochestie 8		Pts: Rodríguez 19; Rebs: Nocioni 9 Asts: Llull 8

Trade Union Sport Palace, Nizhny Novgorod
Attendance: 3,361
Referees: Milivoje Jovcic (SRB), Ioannis Foufis (GRE), Piotr Pastusiak (POL)

4 December 2014
20:30

Report

Dinamo Sassari (Italy)	68–72	(Russia) UNICS Kazan
Scoring by quarter: 17-23, 9-17, 16-18, 26-14
Pts: Logan 17; Rebs: Sanders, Brooks, Todić 4 Asts: Logan, Sosa 5		Pts: Fischer 23; Rebs: Fischer 15; Asts: Zisis 8

Palasport Roberta Serradimigni, Sassari
Attendance: 3,068
Referees: Sasa Pukl (SLO), Srdan Dozai (CRO), Carlos Peruga (ESP)

4 December 2014
20:45

Report

Žalgiris (Lithuania)	57–66	(Turkey) Anadolu Efes
Scoring by quarter: 2-16, 18-16, 16-16, 21-18
Pts: Anderson 18; Rebs: Jankūnas 9 Asts: Lekavičius 3		Pts: Draper 14; Rebs: Perperoglou, Šarić 8 Asts: Draper 3

Žalgiris Arena, Kaunas
Attendance: 10,108
Referees: Christos Christodoulou (GRE), Sergiy Zashchuk (UKR), Aare Halliko (EST)

=== Game 9 ===
12 December 2014
17:00

Report

UNICS Kazan (Russia)	73–60	(Lithuania) Žalgiris
Scoring by quarter: 20-19, 14-17, 19-8, 20-16
Pts: Langford, Fischer 16; Rebs: Fischer 6 Asts: Langford, Kaimakoglou, Jerrells 4		Pts: Anderson 12; Rebs: Jankūnas 9 Asts: Kariniauskas 3

Basket-Hall Arena, Kazan
Attendance: 3,876
Referees: Luigi Lamonica (ITA), Damir Javor (SLO), Ersan Kartal (TUR)

12 December 2014
20:00

Report

Anadolu Efes (Turkey)	61–65	(Russia) Nizhny Novgorod
Scoring by quarter: 18-17, 14-18, 13-15, 16-15
Pts: Lasme 15; Rebs: Šarić, Lasme 7 Asts: Šarić 4		Pts: Khvostov, Thompkins 14; Rebs: Thompkins 8 Asts: 4 players 2

Abdi İpekçi Arena, Istanbul
Attendance: 3,475
Referees: Spiros Gkontas (GRE), Nicola Maestre (FRA), Petros Papapetrou (GRE)

12 December 2014
20:30

Report

Dinamo Sassari (Italy)	58–83	(Spain) Real Madrid
Scoring by quarter: 18-14, 15-27, 18-13, 7-29
Pts: Sosa 18; Rebs: Lawal 9 Asts: Sosa 6		Pts: Reyes 14; Rebs: Carroll 7 Asts: Campazzo 6

Palasport Roberta Serradimigni, Sassari
Attendance: 4,483
Referees: Fernando Rocha (POR), Anastasios Piloidis (GRE), Aleksandar Glisic (SRB)

=== Game 10 ===
18 December 2014
21:00

Report

Real Madrid (Spain)	90–70	(Turkey) Anadolu Efes
Scoring by quarter: 25-25, 22-18, 22-18, 21-9
Pts: Bourousis 19; Rebs: Bourousis 10; Asts: Llull 8		Pts: Perperoglou, Šarić 11; Rebs: Šarić 5 Asts: Šarić 8

Palacio de Deportes, Madrid
Attendance: 10,326
Referees: Borys Ryzhyk (UKR), Olegs Latisevs (LAT), Joseph Bissang (FRA)

19 December 2014
18:00

Report

Nizhny Novgorod (Russia)	78–74	(Russia) UNICS Kazan
Scoring by quarter: 11-19, 24-23, 19-14, 24-18
Pts: Kinsey 23; Rebs: Parakhouski 7 Asts: Antonov 4		Pts: Langford 24; Rebs: Langford 10; Asts: Langford 5

Trade Union Sport Palace, Nizhny Novgorod
Attendance: 2,176
Referees: Ilija Belošević (SRB), Panagiotis Anastopoulos (GRE), Aare Halliko (EST)

19 December 2014
18:45

Report

Žalgiris (Lithuania)	80–79	(Italy) Dinamo Sassari
Scoring by quarter: 29-18, 20-19, 13-23, 18-19
Pts: Anderson 26; Rebs: Jankūnas 9 Asts: Four players 3		Pts: Chessa 14; Rebs: Lawal 7 Asts: Dyson 7

Žalgiris Arena, Kaunas
Attendance: 11,363
Referees: Dani Hierrezuelo (ESP), Petri Mantyla (FIN), Carlos Cortes (ESP)

== Statistics ==
	(Turkey) Anadolu Efes	(Italy) Dinamo Sassari	(Russia) Nizhny Novgorod	(Spain) Real Madrid	(Russia) UNICS Kazan	(Lithuania) Žalgiris Kaunas
PPG	(Croatia) Dario Šarić (11.8)	(United States) Rakim Sanders (13.4)	(Montenegro) Taylor Rochestie (20.0)	(Spain) Sergio Llull & (Spain) Sergio Rodríguez (10.6)	(United States) Keith Langford (16.7)	(United States) James Anderson (17.0)
RPG	(Croatia) Dario Šarić (6.2)	(Nigeria) Shane Lawal (7.3)	(United States) Trey Thompkins (7.2)	(Spain) Felipe Reyes (5.9)	(Israel) D'or Fischer (5.7)	(Lithuania) Paulius Jankūnas (7.0)
APG	(Croatia) Dontaye Draper (4.3)	(Dominican Republic) Édgar Sosa (4.2)	(Montenegro) Taylor Rochestie (5.6)	(Spain) Sergio Rodríguez (5.9)	(Greece) Kostas Kaimakoglou & (Greece) Nikolaos Zisis (3.6)	(United States) James Anderson & (Lithuania) Lukas Lekavičius (2.3)
