= 2014–15 Euroleague Regular Season Group B =

Standings and Results for Group B of the Regular Season phase of the 2014–15 Euroleague basketball tournament.

== Standings ==
Pos	Team	Pld	W	L	PF	PA	PD	CSK	MTA	UNI	ALB	CED	LIM
1	(Russia) CSKA Moscow (A)	10	10	0	880	718	+162		99–80	95–85	95–66	97–79	88–56
2	(Israel) Maccabi Tel Aviv (A)	10	7	3	797	783	+14	61–84		81–73	95–89	73–83	92–76
3	(Spain) Unicaja (A)	10	4 (Note: Tiebreaker: 1–1 (+2))	6	763	757	+6	75–76	66–70		87–84	82–73	75–69
4	(Germany) Alba Berlin (A)	10	4 (Note: Tiebreaker: 1–1 (–2))	6	762	791	−29	68–84	69–84	79–78		67–70	89–66
5	(Croatia) Cedevita (E)	10	3	7	740	789	−49	72–76	71–82	63–78	67–80		102–83
6	(France) Limoges (E)	10	2	8	702	806	−104	76–86	73–79	67–64	65–71	71–60	

(A) Advance to Top 16; (E) Enter 2014–15 Eurocup Basketball last 32 round

== Fixtures and results ==
All times given below are in Central European Time.

=== Game 1 ===
16 October 2014
19:00

Report

Cedevita (Croatia)	63–78	(Spain) Unicaja
Scoring by quarter: 20–18, 16–29, 12–14, 15–17
Pts: Bilan 15; Rebs: Bilan 10; Asts: Babić 3		Pts: Toolson 20; Rebs: Thomas 11; Asts: Granger 6

Dražen Petrović Basketball Hall, Zagreb
Attendance: 3,288
Referees: Roberto Chiari (ITA), Robert Lottermoser (GER), Tomas Jasevicius (LTU)

16 October 2014
20:05

Report

Maccabi Tel Aviv (Israel)	92–76	(France) Limoges
Scoring by quarter: 21–19, 23-18, 25-18, 23-21
Pts: Pargo 20; Rebs: Smith 10; Asts: Pargo 9		Pts: Moerman 17; Rebs: Moerman 12; Asts: Amagou, Westermann 4

Nokia Arena, Tel Aviv
Attendance: 11,060
Referees: Saša Pukl (SLO), Ioannis Foufis (GRE), Miloš Koljenšić (MNE)

17 October 2014
20:15

Report

Alba Berlin (Germany)	68–84	(Russia) CSKA Moscow
Scoring by quarter: 17–21, 21-23, 12-18, 18-22
Pts: Redding 11; Rebs: McLean 7 Asts: Three players 4		Pts: Kaun 16; Rebs: Kaun 9 Asts: Teodosić, Weems 5

O2 World, Berlin
Attendance: 9,038
Referees: Matej Boltauzer (SLO), Jakub Zamojski (POL), Rustu Nuran (TUR)

=== Game 2 ===
23 October 2014
18:00

Report

CSKA Moscow (Russia)	99–80	(Israel) Maccabi Tel Aviv
Scoring by quarter: 21–19, 27–22, 32–13, 19-26
Pts: Weems 18; Rebs: Vorontsevich 11; Asts: Teodosić 11		Pts: Randle 18; Rebs: Randle, Landesberg 6 Asts: Pargo 5

Universal Sports Hall, Moscow
Attendance: 4,798
Referees: Dani Hierrezuelo (Spain), Marek Cmikiewicz (Poland), Petri Mantyla (Finland)

24 October 2014
20:00

Report

Limoges (France)	71–60	(Croatia) Cedevita
Scoring by quarter: 24–16, 17-15, 17-14, 13-15
Pts: Boungou-Colo 17; Rebs: Smith 7 Asts: Westermann 5		Pts: Babić 14; Rebs: Delaš 7 Asts: Babić 5

Beaublanc, Limoges
Attendance: 5,080
Referees: Vincente Bulto (ESP), Gentian Cici (ALB), Markos Michelides (SUI)

24 October 2014
20:45

Report

Unicaja (Spain)	87–84	(Germany) Alba Berlin
Scoring by quarter: 15-20, 21-18, 27-25, 24-21
Pts: Toolson 13; Rebs: Five players 4 Asts: Toolson 8		Pts: Banić 16; Rebs: McLean 5 Asts: Renfroe 7

Martín Carpena, Málaga
Attendance: 6,374
Referees: Grzegorz Ziemblicki (POL), Joseph Bissang (FRA), Igor Dragojević (MNE)

=== Game 3 ===
30 October 2014
20:15

Report

Alba Berlin (Germany)	69–84	(Israel) Maccabi Tel Aviv
Scoring by quarter: 16-23, 13-23, 17-17, 23-21
Pts: Redding 15; Rebs: Banić 6 Asts: Renfroe 6		Pts: Randle 25; Rebs: Ohayon 6 Asts: Pargo 10

O2 World, Berlin
Attendance: 11,040
Referees: Juan Carlos Garcia Gonzalez (SPA), Carmelo Paternico (ITA), Aare Halliko (EST)

31 October 2014
19:30

Report

Cedevita (Croatia)	72–76	(Russia) CSKA Moscow
Scoring by quarter: 19–18, 20-18, 10–17, 23–23
Pts: Gordić 21; Rebs: Bilan 6 Asts: Gordić, Pilepić 3		Pts: de Colo, Teodosić 14; Rebs: Hines 12; Asts: Weems 6

Dražen Petrović Basketball Hall, Zagreb
Attendance: 4,048
Referees: Antonio Conde (ITA), Nicola Maestre (FRA), Oscar Perea (ESP)

31 October 2014
20:45

Report

Unicaja (Spain)	75–69	(France) Limoges
Scoring by quarter: 20-19, 18-17, 25-14, 12-19
Pts: Vázquez 13; Rebs: Thomas 9 Asts: Granger 8		Pts: Smith 14; Rebs: Batista, Westermann 5 Asts: Westermann 9

Martín Carpena, Málaga
Attendance: 6,398
Referees: Srđan Dožai (CRO), Siniša Heceg (CRO), Mario Majkić (SLO)

=== Game 4 ===
6 November 2014
21:15

Report

Maccabi Tel Aviv (Israel)	73–83	(Croatia) Cedevita
Scoring by quarter: 22-26, 18-18, 17-24, 16-15
Pts: Pargo 24; Rebs: Smith 7 Asts: Pargo 5		Pts: Ukić 17; Rebs: Delaš 9 Asts: Ukić 6

Nokia Arena, Tel Aviv
Attendance: 11,060
Referees: Emilio Perez Pizarro (ESP), Gianluca Mattoili (ITA), Pitor Pastusiak (POL)

7 November 2014
18:00

Report

CSKA Moscow (Russia)	95–85	(Spain) Unicaja
Scoring by quarter: 29-21, 23-18, 20-27, 23-19
Pts: Teodosić 27; Rebs: Vorontsevich 7 Asts: Teodosić 10		Pts: Granger, Kuzminskas 20; Rebs: Golubović 9 Asts: Granger 10

Universal Sports Hall, Moscow
Attendance: 4,619
Referees: Christos Christodoulou (GRE), Milivoje Jovicic (SRB), Sasa Maricic (SRB)

7 November 2014
20:00

Report

Alba Berlin (Germany)	89–66	(France) Limoges
Scoring by quarter: 21-12, 29-15, 23-14, 16-25
Pts: Giffey, McLean 18; Rebs: Renfroe, McLean 7 Asts: Renfroe 6		Pts: Smith 17; Rebs: Camara, Boungou-Colo 4 Asts: Curry 6

O2 World, Berlin
Attendance: 8,296
Referees: Tolga Sahin (ITA), Paolo Taurino (ITA), Boris Shulga (UKR)

=== Game 5 ===
13 November 2014
20:45

Report

Unicaja (Spain)	66–70	(Israel) Maccabi Tel Aviv
Scoring by quarter: 13-21, 16-14, 21-19, 16-16
Pts: Toolson, Thomas 16; Rebs: Marković 7 Asts: Marković 7		Pts: Smith 24; Rebs: Smith 10; Asts: Ohayon 5

Martín Carpena, Málaga
Attendance: 7,301
Referees: Sreten Radovic (CRO), Petros Papapetrou (GRE), Saso Petek (SLO)

14 November 2014
19:30

Report

Cedevita (Croatia)	67–80	(Germany) Alba Berlin
Scoring by quarter: 25–21, 10–21, 15–19, 17–19
Pts: Ukić 15; Rebs: Bilan 8 Asts: Ukić 5		Pts: McLean 20; Rebs: Redding 7 Asts: Redding 8

Dražen Petrović Basketball Hall, Zagreb
Attendance: 4,091
Referees: Christos Christodoulou (GRE), Tomas Jasevicius (LTU), Semen Ovinov (RUS)

14 November 2014
20:00

Report

Limoges (France)	76–86	(Russia) CSKA Moscow
Scoring by quarter: 22-27, 22-18, 27-14, 5-27
Pts: Smith 19; Rebs: Moerman 10; Asts: Westermann 5		Pts: Weems 18; Rebs: Kaun 7 Asts: Teodosić 12

Beaublanc, Limoges
Attendance: 4,569
Referees: Luigi Lamonica (ITA), Igor Dragojevic (MNE), Benjamin Jimenez (ESP)

=== Game 6 ===
20 November 2014
18:30

Report

CSKA Moscow (Russia)	95–66	(Germany) Alba Berlin
Scoring by quarter: 28-11, 20-13, 20-22, 27-20
Pts: de Colo 22; Rebs: Hines 7 Asts: Fridzon 5		Pts: Redding 16; Rebs: Redding 8 Asts: Hammonds 4

Universal Sports Hall, Moscow
Attendance: 4,617
Referees: Eddie Viator (FRA), Petros Papapetrou (GRE), Carlos Cortes (ESP)

20 November 2014
20:45

Report

Limoges (France)	73–79	(Israel) Maccabi Tel Aviv
Scoring by quarter: 21-19, 14-23, 13-15, 25-22
Pts: Westermann 16; Rebs: Moerman 13; Asts: Westermann 8		Pts: Landesberg 22; Rebs: Landesberg 9 Asts: Smith 7

Beaublanc, Limoges
Attendance: 4,755
Referees: Miguel Perez Perez (ESP), Elias Koromilas (GRE), Tomislav Hordov (CRO)

21 November 2014
20:45

Report

Unicaja (Spain)	82–73	(Croatia) Cedevita
Scoring by quarter: 22-23, 22-18, 22-22, 16-10
Pts: Toolson 19; Rebs: Golubović 9 Asts: Toolson 4		Pts: Bilan 21; Rebs: Bilan 8 Asts: Ukić 9

Martín Carpena, Málaga
Attendance: 7,525
Referees: Jakub Zamojski (POL), Anastasios Piloidis (GRE), Ioannis Foufis (GRE)

=== Game 7 ===
27 November 2014
20:05

Report

Maccabi Tel Aviv (Israel)	61–84	(Russia) CSKA Moscow
Scoring by quarter: 12-25, 18-15, 16-19, 15-25
Pts: Smith 14; Rebs: Smith 7 Asts: Ohayon 5		Pts: Weems 19; Rebs: Kaun 10; Asts: Fridzon 5

Nokia Arena, Tel Aviv
Attendance: 11,060
Referees: Ilija Belošević (SRB), Robert Lottermoser (GER), Anastasios Piloidis (GRE)

27 November 2014
20:15

Report

Alba Berlin (Germany)	79–78	(Spain) Unicaja
Scoring by quarter: 20-21, 17-24, 16-16, 26-17
Pts: Redding 17; Rebs: Banić 5 Asts: Hammonds, Redding 5		Pts: Toolson, Vasileiadis 15; Rebs: Granger, Thomas 5 Asts: Granger 4

O2 World, Berlin
Attendance: 9,452
Referees: Fernando Rocha (POR), Rustu Nuran (TUR), Marek Cmikiewicz (POL)

28 November 2014
19:30

Report

Cedevita (Croatia)	102–83	(France) Limoges
Scoring by quarter: 32-24, 20-19, 25-22, 25-18
Pts: Bilan 24; Rebs: Bilan 6 Asts: Ukić 9		Pts: Boungou-Colo 18; Rebs: Boungou-Colo 4 Asts: Three players 4

Dražen Petrović Basketball Hall, Zagreb
Attendance: 3,298
Referees: Recep Ankarali (TUR), Juan Carlos Garcia Gonzalez (ESP), Carlos Cortes (ESP)

=== Game 8 ===
4 December 2014
20:00

Report

Limoges (France)	67–64	(Spain) Unicaja
Scoring by quarter: 8-17, 13-17, 22-12, 24-18
Pts: Smith 18; Rebs: Moerman 11; Asts: Smith 5		Pts: Toolson 15; Rebs: Thomas, Suárez 7 Asts: Marković, Granger 3

Beaublanc, Limoges
Attendance: 4,356
Referees: Spiros Gkontas (GRE), Damir Javor (SLO), Ersan Kartal (TUR)

4 December 2014
20:05

Report

Maccabi Tel Aviv (Israel)	95–89	(Germany) Alba Berlin
Scoring by quarter: 25-19, 17-27, 26-17, 27-26
Pts: Smith 26; Rebs: Pargo 7 Asts: Ohayon 8		Pts: McLean 16; Rebs: McLean 9 Asts: Renfroe 7

Nokia Arena, Tel Aviv
Attendance: 11,060
Referees: Luigi Lamonica (ITA), Sergiy Chebyshev (UKR), Benjamin Jimenez (ESP)

5 December 2014
18:00

Report

CSKA Moscow (Russia)	97–79	(Croatia) Cedevita
Scoring by quarter: 32-18, 28-16, 14-19, 23-26
Pts: de Colo, Weems 14; Rebs: Jackson 8 Asts: Jackson 8		Pts: Pilepić 23; Rebs: Žganec, Bilan 4 Asts: Gordić 8

Universal Sports Hall, Moscow
Attendance: 4,474
Referees: Borys Ryzhyk (UKR), Murat Biricik (TUR), Petri Mantyla (FIN)

=== Game 9 ===
11 December 2014
19:30

Report

Cedevita (Croatia)	71–82	(Israel) Maccabi Tel Aviv
Scoring by quarter: 15–14, 19–29, 19–11, 18–28
Pts: Pilepić 22; Rebs: Babić, Bilan 5 Asts: Gordić 5		Pts: Smith 14; Rebs: Smith 6 Asts: Pargo 7

Dražen Petrović Basketball Hall, Zagreb
Attendance: 4,086
Referees: Gregorz Zoemblicki (POL), Roberto Chiari (ITA), Arnis Ozols (LAT)

11 December 2014
20:45

Report

Unicaja (Spain)	75–76 (OT)	(Russia) CSKA Moscow
Scoring by quarter: 20–11, 23–16, 13–22, 10–17, Overtime: 9–10
Pts: Granger, Green 14; Rebs: Golubović 10; Asts: Golubović 4		Pts: de Colo 22; Rebs: Weems 7 Asts: Weems 4

Martín Carpena, Málaga
Attendance: 7,551
Referees: Tolga Sahin (ITA), Olegs Latisevs (LAT), Tomasz Trawicki (POL)

12 December 2014
20:00

Report

Limoges (France)	65–71	(Germany) Alba Berlin
Scoring by quarter: 11–13, 16–22, 20–17, 18–19
Pts: Smith 15; Rebs: Moerman 6 Asts: Curry, Smith 4		Pts: McLean 18; Rebs: Three players 5 Asts: Renfroe 6

Beaublanc, Limoges
Attendance: 4,532
Referees: Jose Ramon Garcia Ortiz (ESP), Miguel Angel Perez Niz (ESP), Siniša Herceg (CRO)

=== Game 10 ===
18 December 2014
18:00

Report

CSKA Moscow (Russia)	88–56	(France) Limoges
Scoring by quarter: 29-17, 16-10, 17-16, 26-13
Pts: Fridzon 19; Rebs: Vorontsevich 7 Asts: Three players 5		Pts: Smith 12; Rebs: Zerbo 6 Asts: Curry 4

Universal Sports Hall, Moscow
Attendance: 4,369
Referees: Milivoje Jovčić (SRB), Jurgis Laurinavicius (LTU), Aleksandar Glišić (SRB)

18 December 2014
20:05

Report

Maccabi Tel Aviv (Israel)	81–73	(Spain) Unicaja
Scoring by quarter: 26-22, 15-15, 17-17, 23-19
Pts: Smith 22; Rebs: Smith 9 Asts: Smith 6		Pts: Granger 11; Rebs: Golubović 11; Asts: Soluade, Toolson 3

Nokia Arena, Tel Aviv
Attendance: 11,060
Referees: Matej Boltauzer (SLO), Jakub Zamojski (POL), Elias Koromilas (GRE)

19 December 2014
20:45

Report

Alba Berlin (Germany)	67–70	(Croatia) Cedevita
Scoring by quarter: 17–13, 15–10, 19–20, 16–27
Pts: McLean 16; Rebs: McLean 7 Asts: Renfroe 7		Pts: Bilan 12; Rebs: Zubčić 7 Asts: Ukić 4

Max Schmeling Halle, Berlin
Attendance: 8,226
Referees: Christos Christodoulou (GRE), Ersan Kartal (TUR), Carlos Peruga (ESP)

== Statistics ==
	(Germany) Alba Berlin	(Croatia) Cedevita Zagreb	(Russia) CSKA Moscow	(France) Limoges CSP	(Israel) Maccabi Tel Aviv	(Spain) Unicaja Málaga
PPG	(United States) Jamel McLean (14.3)	(Croatia) Miro Bilan (12.5)	(Serbia) Miloš Teodosić (17.4)	(United States) Jamar Smith (14.0)	(United States) Devin Smith (16.8)	(United States) Ryan Toolson (13.0)
RPG	(United States) Jamel McLean (5.7)	(Croatia) Miro Bilan (6.6)	(United States) Kyle Hines & (Russia) Sasha Kaun (5.6)	(France) Adrien Moerman (6.9)	(United States) Devin Smith (7.1)	(Serbia) Vladimir Golubović (5.9)
APG	(United States) Alex Renfroe (4.9)	(Croatia) Roko Ukić (4.9)	(Serbia) Miloš Teodosić (8.4)	(France) Leo Westermann (4.3)	(United States) Jeremy Pargo (5.4)	(Uruguay) Jayson Granger (4.2)
