= Ülker Sports and Event Hall =

Sports venue in Istanbul, Turkey

- Ülker Sports Arena
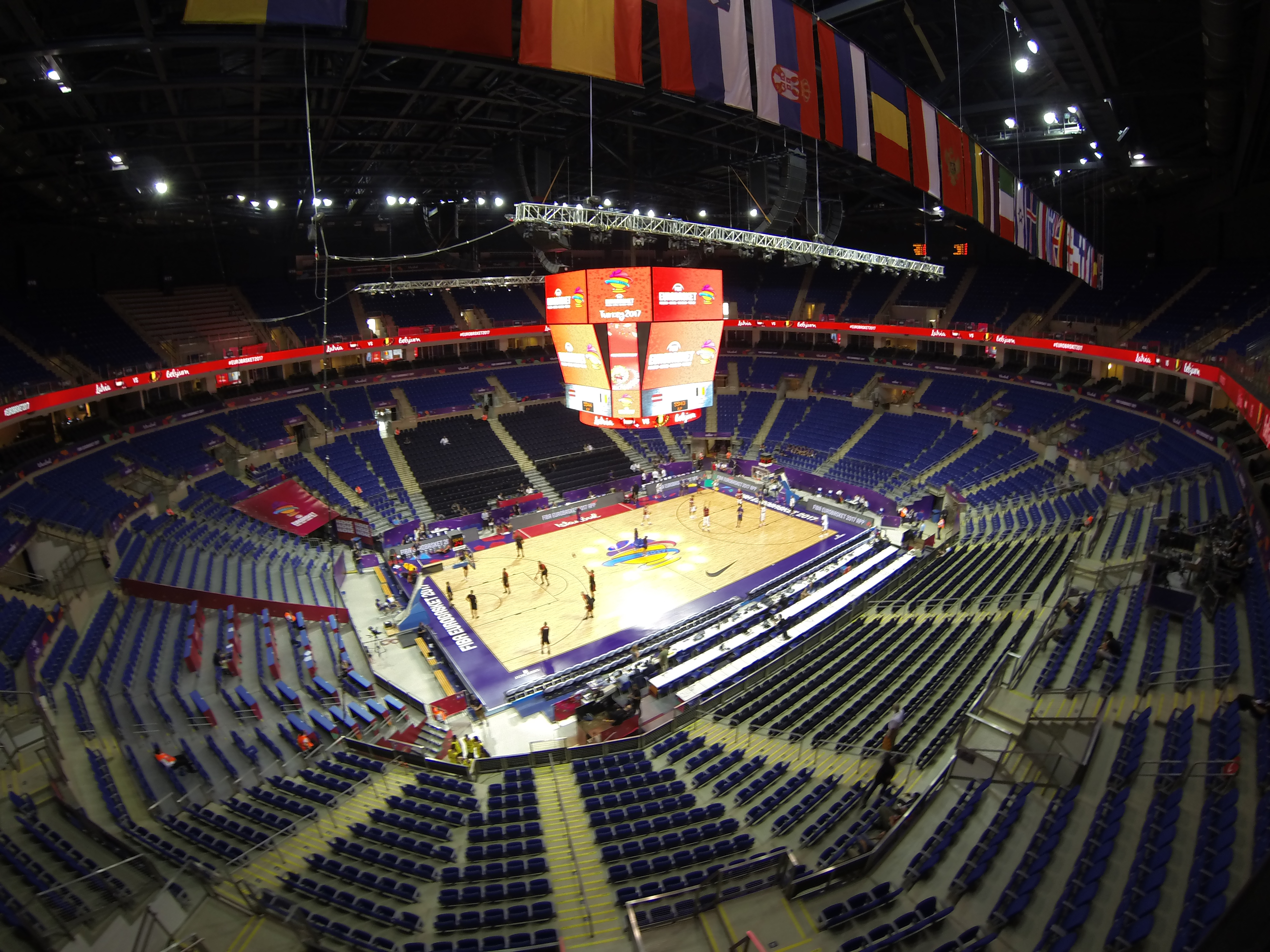
- Interactive map of Ülker Sports and Event Hall
- Full name: Fenerbahçe International Sports Complex
- Former names: Ülker Sports Arena
- Location: Ataşehir, Istanbul, Turkey
- Coordinates: 40°59′35″N 29°6′16″E
- Owner: Fenerbahçe S.K.
- Operator: Anschutz Entertainment Group
- Capacity: Basketball: 13,059 (fan seats); 13,800 (with lounge and VIP areas); Concerts: 15,000
- Scoreboard: LED 250 m^{2} (2,700 ft^{2}), 28.5 ton
- Acreage: 55,000 m^{2} (590,000 ft^{2})

Construction
- Opened: 25 January 2012
- Cost: ₺200 million $110 million €84 million
- Architect: Ömerler Architecture

Tenants
- Fenerbahçe Men's Basketball (BSL); Fenerbahçe Women's Basketball (WBSL); Bahçeşehir Koleji (2021–2022)

Fenerbahçe Ülker Sports and Event Hall (Turkish: Fenerbahçe Ülker Spor ve Etkinlik Salonu) is a multi-purpose indoor arena that is located in Ataşehir, Istanbul, Turkey. The arena is owned and operated by Fenerbahçe S.K. The arena has a capacity of 15,000 people for concerts and 13,059 for basketball games, and it has hosted national and international sports events, such as basketball, volleyball, wrestling, and weightlifting; as well as concerts and congresses.

== Structure and features ==
Designed by Ömerler Architecture, the arena covers an area of approximately 55,000 m^{2} (590,000 ft^{2}) and is one of the major sports arenas in the city of Istanbul. The arena also has fast-food cafeterias and restaurants. It also has 6 locker room areas, 5 additional small locker rooms, 44 lounge areas, VIP seating areas, and a 2,500 capacity hall, which can be used for both training and practice games. Including the lounge and VIP areas, the arena can seat up to 13,800 people for sporting events.

The arena has the biggest scoreboard in Europe, whilst having the first basketball museum of Turkey.

== History ==
Ülker Sports Arena was inaugurated on 25 January 2012, with the Fenerbahçe versus EA7 Emporio Armani game in the EuroLeague 2011–12 season's Top 16 stage. Fenerbahçe's small forward Marko Tomas, scored the first points in the arena, with a 2-point jump shot, during the game against EA7 Emporio Armani. Fenerbahçe S.K.'s basketball departments, Fenerbahçe Men's Basketball and Fenerbahçe Women's Basketball, are currently playing their home games in the arena.

== Museum ==
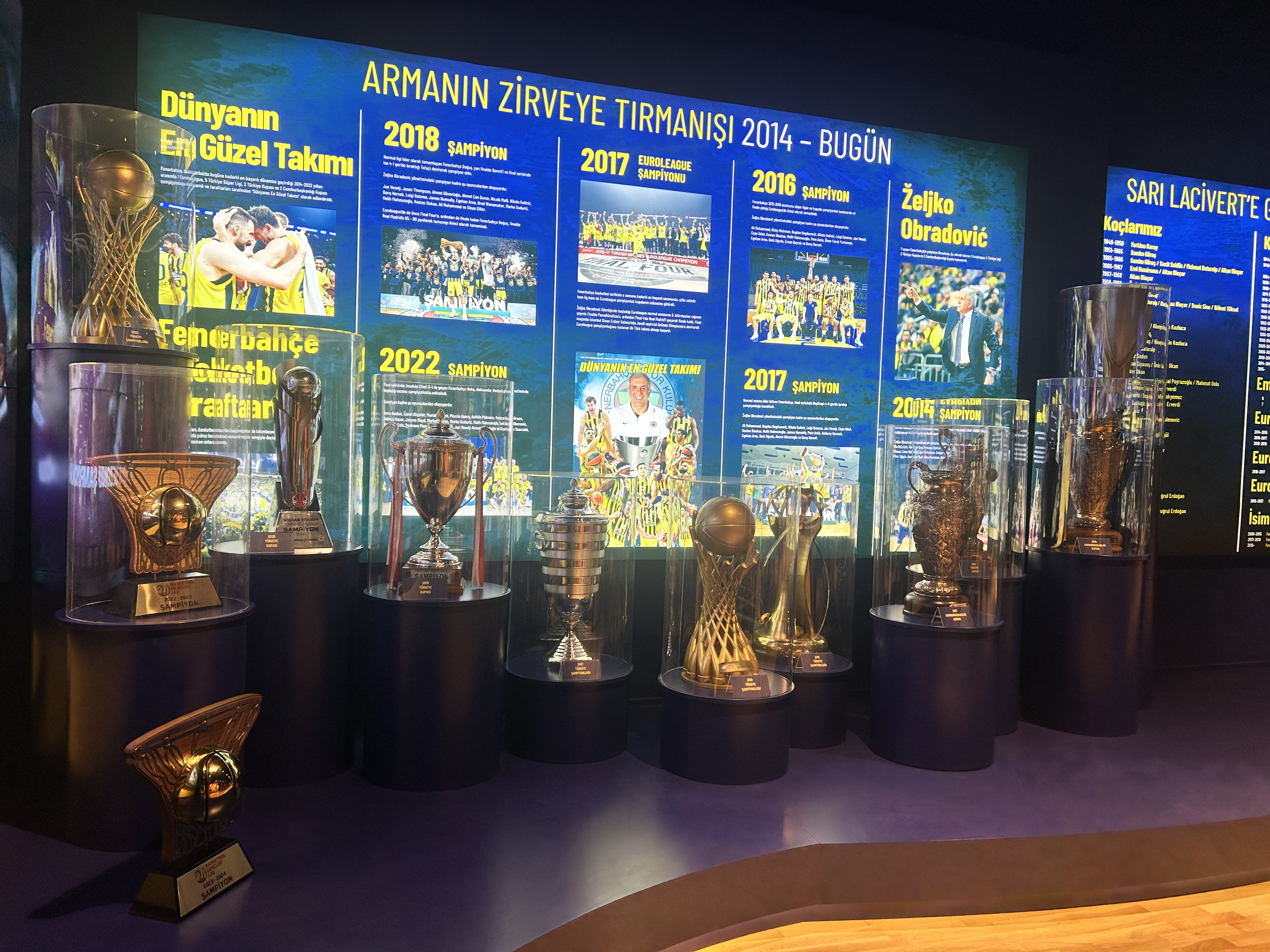
A section of the museum where some of the trophies are exhibited

The Fenerbahçe Basketball Museum, which is the first and only basketball museum in Turkey, contains the entire history of the basketball team from 1913 to the present. The museum is located in the Ülker Sports Arena, the team's basketball hall. Previously located in the Şükrü Saracoğlu Stadium in Kadıköy, the club's headquarters, the trophies and all awards belonging to the basketball branch were transferred to this new museum, which was opened on November 18, 2022. The museum displays the trophies and awards of the men’s basketball team, as well as the women's basketball team.

== Concerts and events ==
2012

- April 27, Mister Universe 2012 Pageant
- September 19, Leonard Cohen performed during his Old Ideas World Tour
- September 22 – October 14, Alegría (Cirque du Soleil)
- October 5, Boston Celtics 2012 NBA Europe Live Tour
- November 16–17, Jennifer Lopez as a part of her Dance Again World Tour

2013

- February 23, WWE RAW World Tour
- March 15–17, Michael Jackson: The Immortal World Tour
- April 6, Glory kickboxing
- April 27, Mark Knopfler as a part of Privateering Tour
- May 3–12, We Will Rock You (musical) as a part of We Will Rock You: 10th Anniversary Tour
- September 7, Music Bank World Tour
- October 5, Oklahoma City Thunder 2013 NBA Europe Live Tour

2014

- October 3–5, FIBA World Championship for Women Finals
- October 11, San Antonio Spurs 2014 NBA Europe Live Tour
- November 16, Demi Lovato as a part of her Demi World Tour

2015

- 2 January – 9 April 2014–15 EuroLeague Top 16 Group F
- 14–16 April 2014–15 EuroLeague Quarterfinals
- August 8, League of Legends Finals of Turkey
- 30 December 2015–16 EuroLeague Top 16

2016

- 14 January – 1 April 2015–16 EuroLeague Top 16
- 12–14 April 2016 EuroLeague Playoffs

2017

- 2017 EuroBasket

2025

- 6 December Till Lindemann as a part of his Meine Welt Tour

== EuroLeague attendances ==
This is a list of the EuroLeague game attendances of Fenerbahçe at Ülker Sports Arena.

| Season | Total | High | Low | Average |
|---|---|---|---|---|
| 2011–12 (Note: Only Top 16 matches were played.) | 35,978 | 12,191 | 11,870 | 11,993 |
| 2012–13 | 85,303 | 12,100 | 1,800 | 7,109 |
| 2013–14 | 137,753 | 12,968 | 3,230 | 11,313 |
| 2014–15 | 164,449 | 13,013 | 8,559 | 11,746 |
| 2015–16 | 142,264 | 12,886 | 7,043 | 10,162 |
| 2016–17 | 179,510 | 12,973 | 7,043 | 11,219 |
| 2017–18 | 196,620 | 12,987 | 9,812 | 11,566 |
| 2018–19 | 182,529 | 12,821 | 7,380 | 10,737 |
| 2019–20 | 138,061 | 12,705 | 7,315 | 9,862 |
| 2021–22 | 77,640 | 12,133 | 1,892 | 5,545 |
| 2022–23 | 199,051 | 15,760 | 7,732 | 10,476 |
| 2023–24 | 165,889 | 12,417 | 2,938 | 9,758 |
| 2024–25 | 171,157 | 12,920 | 1,416 | 10,068 |
| 2025–26 | 212,382 | 12,873 | 2,541 | 10,113 |

== See also ==
- List of indoor arenas in Turkey
