= Miroslav Todić =

Personal information
- Born: 6 January 1985 (age 41) Tuzla, SR Bosnia and Herzegovina, SFR Yugoslavia
- Listed height: 6 ft 9 in (2.06 m)
- Listed weight: 220 lb (100 kg)

Career information
- NBA draft: 2007: undrafted
- Playing career: 2003–present
- Position: Power forward / center

Career history
- 2003–2004: Krka
- 2004: Union Olimpija
- 2004: MTV Kronberg
- 2004–2007: Skyliners Frankfurt
- 2007–2009: Kolossos Rodou
- 2009–2010: Olympia Larissa
- 2010: Sundsvall Dragons
- 2010: Achilleas
- 2010–2011: Ilysiakos
- 2011–2012: Politekhnika-Halychyna
- 2012–2013: Fulgor Libertas Forlì
- 2013: BC Khimik
- 2013–2014: Enel Brindisi
- 2014–2015: Dinamo Sassari
- 2015: Tofaş
- 2015–2016: Champagne Châlons-Reims
- 2016: U-BT Cluj-Napoca
- 2016–2017: Promitheas Patras
- 2018: Benfica
- 2018–2019: Al Sadd Doha
- 2019–2020: Al-Arabi Doha

Career highlights
- All-Qatari League First Team (2019); Portuguese League Cup champion (2018); Romanian Cup winner (2016)

Miroslav Todić (born 6 January 1985) is a Bosnian professional basketball player who last played for S.L. Benfica of the Portuguese basketball League.

== Professional career ==
Todić played in several European leagues first in Slovenia, then Germany from 2004 to 2007 for Skyliners Frankfurt, then he moved to Greece in Kolossus where he remained for two seasons.

In 2009 Miroslav joined Olympia Larissa, where he remained just until mid-season and moved to Sweden to join Sundsvall Dragons. In 2010-2012 he played for the Cypriot top division team Achilleas, and in November he was again back in Greece with Ilysiakos.

In 2011–12 he played for Politekhnika-Halychyna in Ukrainian SuperLeague. After that he came for the first time to Italy for the season 2012-2013 and played with Fulgor Libertas Forlì in the Championship of Legadue. However, at the beginning of 2013 he moved to Ukraine again, this time to Khimik. In the summer of 2013 he was back to Italy, and signed a one-year deal with Enel Brindisi team which features in the highest Italian league.

In July 2014, he signed with Dinamo Sassari. On 18 January 2015, he left the Italian team. On the next day, he signed with Tofaş. In August 2015, he signed with Champagne Reims Basket in France championship Pro A.

On December 7, 2016, Todic joined Promitheas Patras.
