= Ryan Toolson =

American basketball player

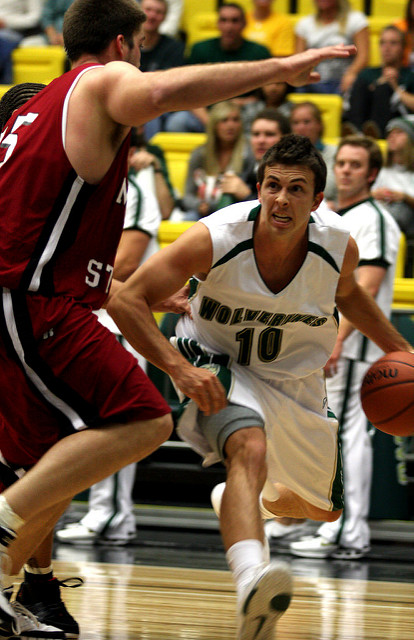
- Toolson in a college basketball game at Utah Valley University

Free agent
- Position: Shooting guard

Personal information
- Born: March 21, 1985 (age 41) Gilbert, Arizona, U.S.
- Listed height: 6 ft 4 in (1.93 m)
- Listed weight: 198 lb (90 kg)

Career information
- High school: Gilbert (Gilbert, Arizona)
- College: Utah Valley (2003–2004, 2006–2009)
- NBA draft: 2009: undrafted
- Playing career: 2009–present

Career history
- 2009–2010: Pınar Karşıyaka
- 2010–2011: Benetton Treviso
- 2011: Sutor Montegranaro
- 2011–2012: Aliağa Petkim
- 2012–2013: Gran Canaria
- 2013–2015: Unicaja
- 2015–2017: Zenit Saint Petersburg
- 2017–2018: İstanbul BB
- 2018–2020: Manresa

Career highlights
- Liga ACB three-point field goal percentage leader (2015); Turkish League All Star (2010); All-VTB United League Second Team (2016)

Ryan Toolson (born March 21, 1985) is an American professional basketball player who last played for Baxi Manresa of the Liga ACB. Standing at 6 ft 4 in (1.93 m), he plays at the shooting guard position.

== Professional career ==
In June 2013, Toolson signed a one-year deal with Spanish club Unicaja. In June 2014, he re-signed with Unicaja for one more season.

On July 10, 2015, Toolson signed a one-plus-one year contract, with the Russian club Zenit Saint Petersburg. On June 8, 2017, he parted ways with Zenit.

On November 10, 2017, Toolson signed with Turkish club İstanbul BB.

On July 12, 2018, Toolson signed with Spanish club Baxi Manresa. During the 2019-20 season he averaged 14 points and 2 assists per game. On May 22, he agreed to part ways with the team.

== Personal life ==
He is the cousin of Andy Toolson and the nephew of Danny Ainge.

== Career statistics ==
Legend
GP	Games played	GS	Games started	MPG	Minutes per game
FG%	Field-goal percentage	3P%	3-point field-goal percentage	FT%	Free-throw percentage
RPG	Rebounds per game	APG	Assists per game	SPG	Steals per game
BPG	Blocks per game	PPG	Points per game	PIR	Performance index rating
**Bold**	Career high

=== EuroLeague ===
Year	Team	GP	GS	MPG	FG%	3P%	FT%	RPG	APG	SPG	BPG	PPG	PIR
2013–14	Unicaja	19	**5**	19.1	.388	.368	**.941**	1.1	1.0	.3	**.1**	7.2	3.7
2014–15	Unicaja	**22**	**5**	**23.0**	**.409**	**.370**	.902	**1.3**	**2.5**	**.6**	.0	**10.9**	**7.9**
Career		41	10	21.2	.401	.369	.914	1.2	1.8	.4	.0	9.2	6.0

== See also ==
- List of NCAA Division I men's basketball players with 60 or more points in a game
