= Sasha Kaun =

Russian former professional basketball player (born 1985)

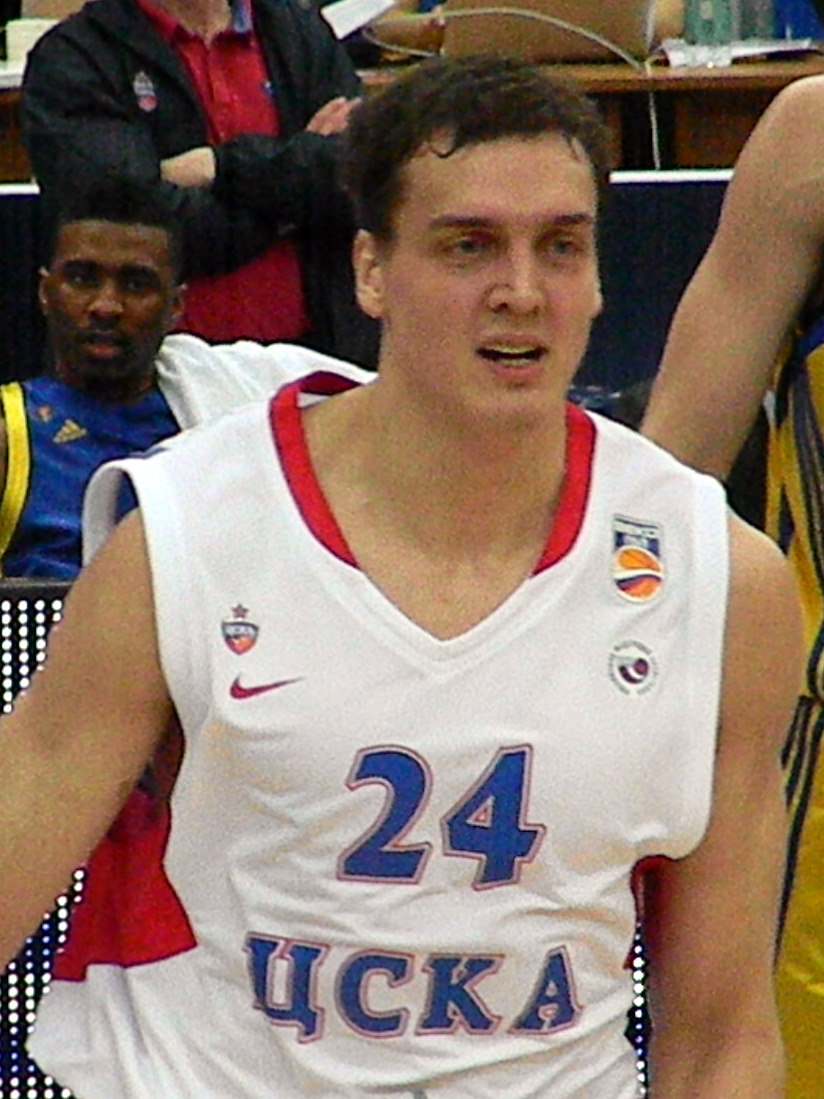
- Kaun at the 2011 PBL All-Star Game

Personal information
- Born: May 8, 1985 (age 41) Tomsk, Russian SFSR, Soviet Union
- Listed height: 6 ft 11 in (2.11 m)
- Listed weight: 260 lb (118 kg)

Career information
- High school: Florida Air Academy (Melbourne, Florida)
- College: Kansas (2004–2008)
- NBA draft: 2008: 2nd round, 56th overall pick
- Drafted by: Seattle SuperSonics
- Playing career: 2008–2016
- Position: Center
- Number: 24, 14

Career history
- 2008–2015: CSKA Moscow
- 2015–2016: Cleveland Cavaliers
- 2016: →Canton Charge

Career highlights
- NBA champion (2016); 5× VTB United League champion (2010, 2012–2015); 5× Russian Professional League champion (2009–2013); Russian Cup winner (2010); VTB United League Defensive Player of the Year (2014); 2× All-VTB United League First Team (2010, 2014); NCAA champion (2008)
- Stats at NBA.com
- Stats at Basketball Reference
Medals
Men's basketball
Representing Russia
Olympic Games
Bronze medal – third place	2012 London	Team

Alexander "Sasha" Olegovich Kaun (Russian: Александр Олегович Каун; born May 8, 1985) is a Russian former professional basketball player. He played college basketball in the United States for the University of Kansas for four seasons, where he won an NCAA championship in 2008 before being selected with the 56th overall pick by the Seattle SuperSonics in the 2008 NBA draft. He played seven seasons in Russia for CSKA Moscow. In 2015, he returned to the United States and played his only NBA season with the Cleveland Cavaliers, where he won an NBA championship in 2015–16. In doing so, Kaun became one of the first two Russians in history, along with teammate Timofey Mozgov, to win an NBA championship. He also represented Russia in the 2012 Summer Olympics.

== High school ==
In high school at the Florida Air Academy, Kaun averaged 13.0 points, 7.0 rebounds, and 2.0 blocks per game as a junior and 15.3 points and 12.6 rebounds per game as a senior. He led his team to a 23–0 record and to the Florida state championships.

== College career ==
During the fall of 2003, Kaun committed to the University of Kansas. He also received offers from Duke and Michigan State.

During his freshman season with the Kansas Jayhawks, he played in 27 games, starting twice. In his sophomore season he helped the Jayhawks to an 80–68 win against the Texas Longhorns, which made the Jayhawks the 2006 Big 12 Conference champions. During his senior year, he was the starting center for the Jayhawks and with them he won the 2008 NCAA Championship. He graduated with a degree in computer science and was selected to the Academic All Big 12 Basketball Team three times, in 2006, 2007, and 2008.

== Professional career ==
=== CSKA Moscow (2008–2015) ===
Kaun was drafted 56th overall in the 2008 NBA draft by the Seattle SuperSonics. He was the final draft pick in Sonics history, before the franchise moved to Oklahoma City. His NBA draft rights were then traded to the Cleveland Cavaliers for cash considerations.

He signed a three-year contract worth €2,700,000 with the Russian team CSKA Moscow in 2008. On May 23, 2012, Kaun re-signed his contract with CSKA, staying three more seasons with the team.

In the 2014–15 season, CSKA Moscow has managed to advance to the Euroleague Final Four for fourth straight season, after eliminating Panathinaikos for the second straight season in the quarter-final series, 3–1. However, in the semifinal game, despite being dubbed by media as an absolute favorite to advance, once again lost to Olympiacos. The final score was 70–68, after an Olympiacos comeback in 4th quarter, led by Vassilis Spanoulis. CSKA Moscow eventually won the third place after defeating Fenerbahçe with 86–80. In his "contract year", Kaun had the best season since coming in the club, starting in all 30 games played in the Euroleague and averaging a career-high 9.9 points and 4.5 rebounds on 69.1% shooting from the field.

After winning his fifth VTB United League championship with CSKA, there were some reports that Kaun had retired from professional basketball. A day later, Kaun denied these reports, adding that he was, however, done playing basketball in Europe.

=== Cleveland Cavaliers (2015–2016) ===
On September 9, 2015, Kaun signed with the Cleveland Cavaliers. He made his debut for the Cavaliers on October 28, recording one rebound, one assist, one steal and one block in a 106–76 win over the Memphis Grizzlies. Over the first half of the 2015–16 season, Kaun appeared in just nine games for the Cavaliers, scoring a season-high four points on two occasions. On April 11, 2016, Kaun was assigned to the Canton Charge, the Cavaliers' D-League affiliate, for a day of training. He was reassigned to Canton the next day to help the team in Game 1 of the D-League Eastern Conference Finals against the Sioux Falls Skyforce. The next day, he was recalled by the Cavaliers. Kaun did not play a single game for the Cavaliers during their playoff run, a run that ended with the Cavaliers defeating the Golden State Warriors 4–3 in the 2016 NBA Finals to win the championship. Kaun and his teammate, Timofey Mozgov, became the first Russians to win an NBA championship.

On July 15, 2016, Kaun was traded, along with cash considerations, to the Philadelphia 76ers in exchange for the rights to Chukwudiebere Maduabum. He was waived by the 76ers on July 17, and six days later, he announced his retirement from professional basketball.

== Russian national team ==
Kaun was a member of the senior Russian national basketball team, and was part of the team that won the bronze medal at the 2012 Summer Olympics.

== Personal life ==
Kaun is married to Taylor Kaun (née Blue), a former soccer player at the University of Kansas.

== Career statistics ==
Legend
GP	Games played	GS	Games started	MPG	Minutes per game
FG%	Field-goal percentage	3P%	3-point field-goal percentage	FT%	Free-throw percentage
RPG	Rebounds per game	APG	Assists per game	SPG	Steals per game
BPG	Blocks per game	PPG	Points per game	PIR	Performance index rating
**Bold**	Career high

=== NBA ===
†	Denotes season in which Kaun won the NBA championship

==== Regular season ====
Year	Team	GP	GS	MPG	FG%	3P%	FT%	RPG	APG	SPG	BPG	PPG
2015–16†	Cleveland	25	0	3.8	.529	.000	.455	1.0	.1	.2	.2	.9
Career		25	0	3.8	.529	.000	.455	1.0	.1	.2	.2	.9

=== Euroleague ===
*	Led the league

Year	Team	GP	GS	MPG	FG%	3P%	FT%	RPG	APG	SPG	BPG	PPG	PIR
2008–09	CSKA Moscow	10	0	5.1	.429	—	.417	1.5	.1	—	.3	1.1	1.2
2009–10	CSKA Moscow	21	17	**22.4**	.713*	—	.569	**4.6**	**.6**	.4	1.0	9.1	11.5
2011–12	CSKA Moscow	21	4	11.4	.712*	—	.516	2.0	.1	.4	.2	4.3	4.0
2012–13	CSKA Moscow	**30**	27	20.8	**.716***	—	.520	4.0	.5	.4	**1.2**	8.1	10.8
2013–14	CSKA Moscow	**30**	16	18.4	.701	—	.590	3.5	.5	**.8**	.8	8.4	11.2
2014–15	CSKA Moscow	**30***	**30***	20.1	.691	—	**.673**	4.5	.5	.4	.9	**9.9**	**13.7**
Career		142	94	17.9	.702	—	.581	3.6	.4	.5	.8	7.6	9.8
