= Trey Thompkins =

American basketball player (born 1990)

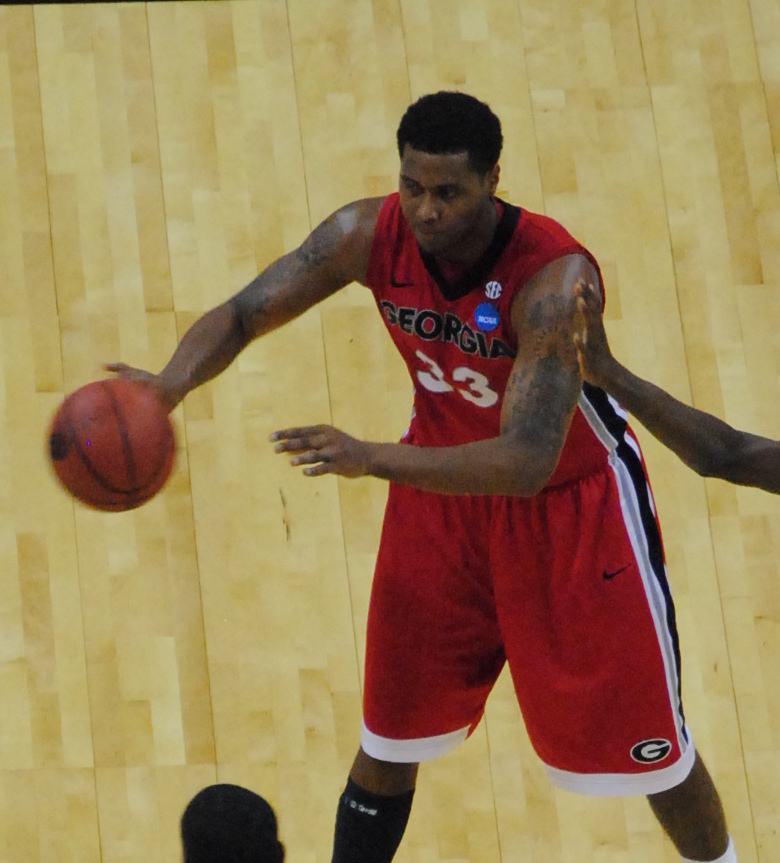
- Thompkins playing for Georgia

No. 33 – Formosa Dreamers
- Position: Power forward
- League: Taiwan Professional Basketball League

Personal information
- Born: May 29, 1990 (age 36) Lithonia, Georgia, U.S.
- Listed height: 208 cm (6 ft 10 in)
- Listed weight: 105 kg (231 lb)

Career information
- High school: Wesleyan School (Peachtree Corners, Georgia)
- College: Georgia (2008–2011)
- NBA draft: 2011: 2nd round, 37th overall pick
- Drafted by: Los Angeles Clippers
- Playing career: 2011–present

Career history
- 2011–2013: Los Angeles Clippers
- 2014–2015: Nizhny Novgorod
- 2015–2022: Real Madrid
- 2022–2023: Zenit Saint Petersburg
- 2024: Crvena zvezda
- 2024–2025: Coruña
- 2025–present: Formosa Dreamers

Career highlights
- TPBL champion (2026); EuroLeague champion (2018); 4× Liga ACB champion (2016, 2018, 2019, 2022); 3× Spanish Cup winner (2016, 2017, 2020); FIBA Intercontinental Cup champion (2015); 4× Spanish Super Cup champion (2018–2021); FIBA Intercontinental Cup champion (2015); ABA League champion (2024); First-team All-SEC (2010); Third-team Parade All-American (2008)
- Stats at NBA.com
- Stats at Basketball Reference
Medals
Men's basketball
Representing the United States
Under-19 World Championship
Gold medal – first place	2009 New Zealand	Team

Howard Samuel "Trey" Thompkins III (born May 29, 1990) is an American professional basketball player for the Formosa Dreamers of the Taiwan Professional Basketball League (TPBL). Standing at 6 ft 10 in (2.08 m), he plays at the power forward position. He played college basketball for the Georgia Bulldogs.

== High school career ==
Thompkins attended the Wesleyan School in Peachtree Corners, Georgia. During his junior year, Thompkins decided to attend Oak Hill Academy where he averaged 15.8 points per game and 8.9 rebounds. For his senior season, Thompkins averaged 27.5 points and 14.7 rebounds for Wesleyan as they won the Georgia High School Association Class AA state championship. In May 2007, Thompkins committed to the University of Georgia for the 2008–2009 NCAA season despite offers from many other schools.

Considered a four-star recruit by Rivals.com, Thompkins was listed as the No. 11 power forward and the No. 30 player in the nation in 2008.

== College career ==
In Thompkins's freshman season for the Bulldogs, he was named to the SEC All-Freshman team while leading the team in rebounding (7.4) and blocks (31 total) and second in points (12.6). He missed the preseason practices and first four regular season games due to injury while the team eventually finished the season below expectations, having head coach Dennis Felton fired midseason.

In his sophomore season, Thompkins skied to averages of 17.7 points and 8.3 rebounds. He was a unanimous vote for the first team All-SEC selection.

Thompkins leveled out in his junior year statistically, while the Bulldogs eventually made it to the 2011 NCAA Men's Division I Basketball Tournament only to be eliminated 68–65 in the first round to the Washington Huskies. He was once again a first team All-SEC selection.

While preparing for the draft, there were concerns about Thompkins' body fat level of 15.5%. Jay Bilas describes Trey Thompkins' body fat percentage as "pretty good if you're a sea lion."

== Professional career ==
=== Los Angeles Clippers (2011–13) ===
Thompkins announced that he would leave Georgia and forgo his senior season to enter the 2011 NBA draft on April 5, 2011.

Thompkins was drafted with the 37th overall pick in the 2nd round of the 2011 NBA draft by the Los Angeles Clippers. In his first season with the Clippers, he averaged 2.4 points and 1 rebound over 24 games played. In the summer of 2012, during the NBA Summer League, he suffered a bone bruise on his left knee, which sidelined him off the court for nearly two years, including the rehabilitation time. He was waived by the Clippers on March 14, 2013.

=== Nizhny Novgorod (2014–2015) ===
On August 4, 2014, Thompkins signed a one-year deal with the Russian team Nizhny Novgorod. From the start of the 2014–15 season, he saw a lot of trust from the team's head coach, Ainars Bagatskis, as he played at least 20 minutes per game, in both the VTB United League and the EuroLeague. On November 6, in a home game loss to Anadolu Efes, he had 14 points and 10 rebounds, making his first EuroLeague double-double. On November 21, against Dinamo Sassari, he grabbed a season-high 15 rebounds, also scoring 13 points.

On February 6, in a game against Unicaja, he scored a season-high 27 points, and added 13 rebounds, to help his team win the first game in the EuroLeague Top 16. That was also his third straight EuroLeague game win which he scored more than 20 points. Nizhny Novgorod eventually finished its participation in the EuroLeague by finishing last in its Top 16 group, with 3 wins in 14 games. Over 23 EuroLeague games played, Thompkins averaged 14.5 points and a third best in the league 8.1 rebounds per game. Nizhny Novgorod ended the competition in the VTB United League, after being eliminated by CSKA Moscow, by a 3–0 series sweep in the league's playoff semifinal series.

=== Real Madrid (2015–2022) ===
On August 26, 2015, Thompkins signed a one-year deal with the Spanish team Real Madrid. On July 16, 2016, Thompkins signed a two-year contract extension with Real Madrid.

In May 2018, Real Madrid won the 2017–18 EuroLeague championship, after defeating Fenerbahçe Doğuş in the final game with 85–80. Over 28 EuroLeague games, Thompkins averaged 9.5 points, 5.1 rebounds and 1.1 assists per game.

On July 6, 2018, Thompkins re-signed a two-year deal with the Spanish team Real Madrid.

On March 12, 2020, Thompkins tested positive for SARS-CoV-2, the virus responsible for the COVID-19 pandemic. He was the first professional basketball player in Europe to be diagnosed with the virus.

On June 9, 2020, Thompkins signed a three-year extension with the team.

On June 27, 2022, Thompkins officially parted ways with the club after seven seasons.

=== Zenit (2022–2023) ===
On July 13, 2022, he has signed with Zenit Saint Petersburg of the VTB United League.

=== Crvena zvezda (2024) ===
On February 7, 2024, Thompkins signed a contract with Crvena zvezda of the Basketball League of Serbia, the Adriatic League and the EuroLeague, and he won Basketball League of Serbia and the Adriatic League.

=== Formosa Dreamers (2025–present) ===
On August 5, 2025, Thompkins signed with the Formosa Dreamers of the Taiwan Professional Basketball League (TPBL).

On July 2, 2026, Thompkins re-signed with the Formosa Dreamers of the Taiwan Professional Basketball League (TPBL).

== Career statistics ==
Legend
GP	Games played	GS	Games started	MPG	Minutes per game
FG%	Field-goal percentage	3P%	3-point field-goal percentage	FT%	Free-throw percentage
RPG	Rebounds per game	APG	Assists per game	SPG	Steals per game
BPG	Blocks per game	PPG	Points per game	PIR	Performance index rating
**Bold**	Career high

=== NBA ===
==== Regular season ====
Year	Team	GP	GS	MPG	FG%	3P%	FT%	RPG	APG	SPG	BPG	PPG
2011–12	LA Clippers	24	0	5.0	.393	.308	.714	1.0	.1	.1	.1	2.4
Career		24	0	5.0	.393	.308	.714	1.0	.1	.1	.1	2.4

=== EuroLeague ===
†	Denotes seasons in which Thompkins won the EuroLeague

Year	Team	GP	GS	MPG	FG%	3P%	FT%	RPG	APG	SPG	BPG	PPG	PIR
2014–15	Nizhny Novgorod	23	**18**	**27.5**	.481	.370	.837	**8.2**	**1.6**	**.9**	**.5**	**14.5**	**15.8**
2015–16	Real Madrid	15	6	15.1	.390	.350	**1.000**	3.0	1.1	.1	.3	5.9	4.9
2016–17	Real Madrid	26	3	13.7	.475	.475	.810	2.4	.2	.3	.2	6.1	4.6
2017–18†	Real Madrid	29	16	21.2	.483	.420	.857	5.1	1.1	.7	.3	9.5	11.1
2018–19	Real Madrid	24	1	17.3	.487	.392	.885	3.6	.7	.5	.1	8.4	8.3
2019–20	Real Madrid	20	5	19.9	**.537**	.485	.893	3.9	.7	.5	.2	10.9	11.4
2020–21	Real Madrid	**38**	10	21.3	.514	.424	.947	4.1	1.2	.6	.3	10.1	11.0
2021–22	Real Madrid	13	0	12.8	.418	**.500**	**1.000**	2.2	.6	.4	.2	5.7	3.8
2023–24	Crvena zvezda	1	0	10.0	.333	.500	—	1.0	—	—	—	3.0	0.0
Career		189	59	19.2	.486	.422	.881	4.2	.9	.5	.3	9.2	9.4

=== Domestic leagues ===
Year	Team	League	GP	MPG	FG%	3P%	FT%	RPG	APG	SPG	BPG	PPG
2014–15	(Russia) Nizhny Novgorod	VTBUL	35	27.6	.512	.367	.931	7.5	1.7	1.0	.7	15.8
2015–16	(Spain) Real Madrid	ACB	33	18.8	.604	.526	.909	3.5	.8	.7	.4	9.2
2016–17	(Spain) Real Madrid	ACB	6	16.2	.465	.476	.800	2.5	—	.5	.2	9.7
2017–18	(Spain) Real Madrid	ACB	27	20.2	.503	.356	.815	3.5	.9	.3	.2	9.1
2018–19	(Spain) Real Madrid	ACB	30	18.9	.500	.460	.864	3.2	.8	.4	.4	9.4
2019–20	(Spain) Real Madrid	ACB	30	18.9	.500	.460	.864	3.2	.8	.4	.4	9.4
2020–21	(Spain) Real Madrid	ACB	17	24.0	.497	.403	.818	4.2	2.1	.7	.3	11.8
2021–22	(Spain) Real Madrid	ACB	27	20.6	.514	.425	.860	3.3	1.4	.9	.3	9.5
2022–23	(Russia) Zenit	VTBUL	29	20.6	.537	.488	.833	4.1	.6	.7	.4	9.3
2023–24	(Serbia) Crvena zvezda	KLS	3	14.1	.357	.250	1.000	2.7	.7	.7	—	5.3
2023–24	(Serbia) Crvena zvezda	ABA	8	11.2	.462	.304	1.000	2.5	.4	.4	—	6.0

=== College ===
Year	Team	GP	GS	MPG	FG%	3P%	FT%	RPG	APG	SPG	BPG	PPG
2008–09	Georgia	28	23	26.0	.434	**.384**	.726	7.4	.8	1.0	1.1	12.6
2009–10	Georgia	**31**	**29**	31.0	**.483**	.377	**.762**	**8.3**	**1.9**	1.0	1.2	**17.7**
2010–11	Georgia	30	**29**	**31.2**	.481	.311	.689	7.6	1.4	**1.1**	**1.7**	16.4
Career		89	81	29.5	.469	.357	.729	7.8	1.4	1.0	1.3	15.7

== International career ==
Thompkins represented the Under-19 United States national team at the 2009 Under-19 World Championship, which was held in New Zealand, and where the USA team won the gold medal. Over 9 tournament games, he averaged 10.6 points and 5 rebounds per game.

== Personal life ==
His father, Howard Thompkins Jr., played college basketball at Wagner College, and was later drafted by the Atlanta Hawks in 1981.
