= Taylor Rochestie =

American-born Montenegrin basketball player

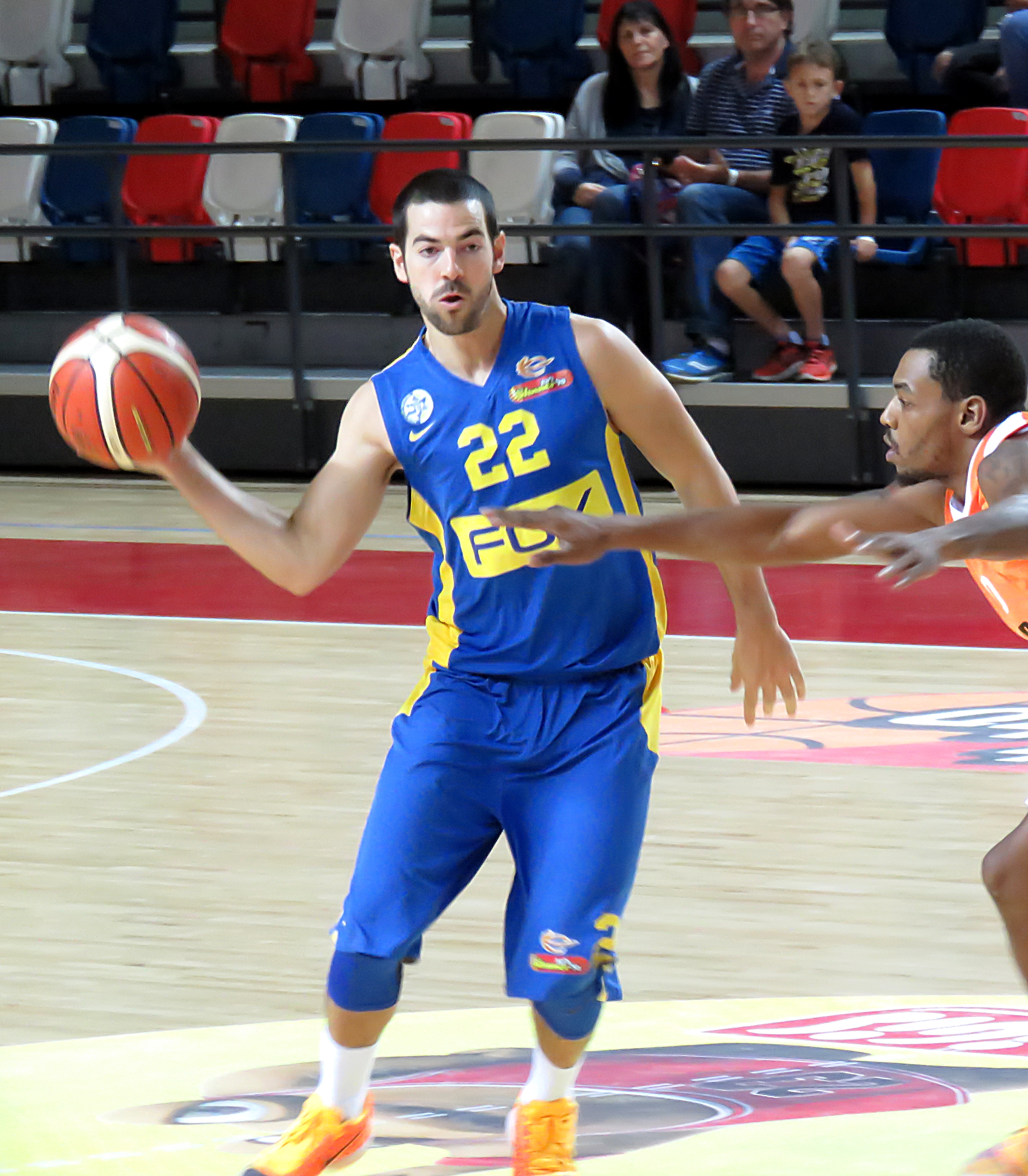
- Rochestie with Maccabi Tel Aviv in 2015

Personal information
- Born: July 1, 1985 (age 41) Houston, Texas, U.S.
- Listed height: 6 ft 1 in (1.85 m)
- Listed weight: 195 lb (88 kg)

Career information
- High school: Santa Barbara (Santa Barbara, California)
- College: Tulane (2004–2005); Washington State (2006–2009)
- NBA draft: 2009: undrafted
- Playing career: 2009–2024
- Position: Point guard
- Number: 22, 10, 1, 0

Career history
- 2009–2010: BG Göttingen
- 2010–2011: Galatasaray
- 2011: Alba Berlin
- 2011–2012: Le Mans Sarthe
- 2012–2013: Caja Laboral
- 2013: Angelico Biella
- 2013–2014: Montepaschi Siena
- 2014–2015: Nizhny Novgorod
- 2015–2016: Maccabi Tel Aviv
- 2016–2017: Lokomotiv Kuban
- 2017–2018: Crvena zvezda
- 2018–2019: Tianjin Gold Lions
- 2019: Anhui Dragons
- 2019–2020: Olympiacos
- 2020: Crvena zvezda
- 2020–2021: Hapoel Haifa
- 2021: Le Mans
- 2021–2022: Tianjin Pioneers
- 2022–2023: Shandong Hi-Speed Kirin
- 2023: Le Mans
- 2023–2024: Tianjin Pioneers

Career highlights
- Alphonso Ford EuroLeague Top Scorer Trophy (2015); EuroLeague 50–40–90 club (2015); FIBA EuroChallenge champion (2010); FIBA EuroChallenge Final Four MVP (2010); All-VTB United League Second Team (2015); Serbian League champion (2018); Italian Supercup winner (2013); Israeli Cup winner (2016); French All-Star Game (2012); German League Newcomer of the Year (2010); All-Adriatic League Team (2018); CBA All-Star (2019); First-team All-Pac-10 (2009)

Taylor Campbell Rochestie (born July 1, 1985) is an American-born naturalized Montenegrin former professional basketball player. He represented the senior Montenegrin national team internationally. He also holds an Israeli citizenship. Standing at a height of 6 ft 1 in (1.85 m), he played at the point guard position. Rochestie won the Alphonso Ford EuroLeague Top Scorer Trophy in 2015.

== Early life ==
Rochestie was born to Howard Rochestie, a Trenton, NJ native of Jewish descent, and Christina Campbell in Houston, Texas.

== High school career ==
Rochestie attended Santa Barbara High School in California, where he started playing basketball, and graduated as the all-time leading scorer of his high school's history.

== College career ==
In 2004, Rochestie attended Tulane University, where he played one year of college basketball, with the Tulane Green Wave. He then transferred to Washington State University, where he sat out the 2006 academic year, due to NCAA rules. He then played with the Washington State Cougars from 2007 to 2009.

== Professional career ==
Rochestie went undrafted in the 2009 NBA draft. On July 30, 2009, he signed his first professional contract with BG Göttingen of Germany for the 2009–10 season. He helped his team to win the 2010 EuroChallenge title, and was also named the Final Four MVP.

On June 23, 2010, he signed a one-year deal with Galatasaray Café Crown of the Turkish Basketball Super League. On February 8, 2011, he parted ways with Galatasaray. Nine days later, he returned to Germany, and signed with Alba Berlin for the rest of the season.

On August 2, 2011, he signed a one-year deal with Le Mans Sarthe Basket of the French LNB Pro A.

On July 20, 2012, Rochestie signed a two-year deal with Caja Laboral of the Spanish Liga ACB. On January 8, 2013, he parted ways with Laboral. The next day, he signed with Angelico Biella of the Italian Serie A for the rest of the season.

On August 26, 2013, he signed a one-year contract with the Italian club Montepaschi Siena. On January 5, 2014, he left Siena and signed with Nizhny Novgorod of Russia for the rest of the season. On July 30, 2014, he re-signed with Nizhny for one more season. On May 5, 2015, he was awarded with the Alphonso Ford EuroLeague Top Scorer Trophy, an annual award given to the EuroLeague's top scorer of the season. Nizhny Novgorod's season in their national domestic league (VTB United League) ended, after they were eliminated by CSKA Moscow, with 3–0 sweep in the league's semifinal playoff series.

On June 21, 2015, Rochestie signed a two-year deal, with an option for another one, with the Israeli club Maccabi Tel Aviv. On September 3, 2016, he parted ways with Maccabi. Two days later, he signed a one-year contract with Russian club Lokomotiv Kuban.

On September 8, 2017, Rochestie signed with Serbian club Crvena zvezda for the 2017–18 season.

On August 19, 2018, Rochestie inked with Tianjin Gold Lions of the Chinese Basketball Association. On March 26, 2019, he signed with NBL team Anhui Dragons to continue his career in China.

On October 26, 2019, Rochestie officially signed with Greek club Olympiacos, making his return to the EuroLeague. He averaged 4.6 points, 1.0 rebound and 3.6 assists per game.

On October 7, 2020, Rochestie returned to Crvena zvezda and signed a 2-month contract with an option to extend it until the end of the 2020–21 season. The extension was not exercised, leading Rochestie to leave the club in December 2020.

On December 18, 2020, Rochestie signed with Hapoel Haifa of the Israel Basketball Premier League.

On October 4, 2021, Rochestie signed with Le Mans of the French LNB Pro A.

On December 14, 2021, Rochestie returned to Tianjin Pioneers.

On February 23, 2023, he signed with Le Mans of the French Pro A.

== National team career ==
Rochestie was a member of the senior Montenegrin national basketball team. With Montenegro's national team, he played at the qualifying tournament for EuroBasket 2013, and the qualifying tournament for EuroBasket 2015.

== Career statistics ==
Legend
GP	Games played	GS	Games started	MPG	Minutes per game
FG%	Field-goal percentage	3P%	3-point field-goal percentage	FT%	Free-throw percentage
RPG	Rebounds per game	APG	Assists per game	SPG	Steals per game
BPG	Blocks per game	PPG	Points per game	PIR	Performance index rating
**Bold**	Career high

=== EuroLeague ===
*	Led the league

Year	Team	GP	GS	MPG	FG%	3P%	FT%	RPG	APG	SPG	BPG	PPG	PIR
2012–13	Baskonia	4	0	7.6	.182	.250	.333	.3	.3	**1.0**	—	1.5	-0.8
2013–14	Mens Sana	10	0	16.7	.403	.391	.857	1.5	1.7	.5	—	6.5	3.4
2014–15	Nizhny Novgorod	21	17	**30.0**	**.511**	**.500**	**.925**	1.6	**5.7**	.6	—	**18.9**	**21.0**
2015–16	Maccabi	10	5	29.3	.429	.404	.920	2.1	5.5	.2	—	14.0	13.5
2017–18	Crvena zvezda	**30**	**29**	26.0	.494	.407	.891	**2.3**	5.0	.8	**.1**	13.4	14.4
2019–20	Olympiacos	21	0	14.3	.418	.412	.850	1.0	3.6	.3	—	4.6	5.0
2020–21	Crvena zvezda	9	0	11.2	.519	.455	1.000	.7	2.0	—	.1	3.9	3.6
Career		105	51	21.9	.472	.433	.896	1.6	4.2	.5	.0	10.9	11.2

=== Domestic leagues ===
Season	Team	League	GP	MPG	FG%	3P%	FT%	RPG	APG	SPG	BPG	PPG
2009–10	Göttingen	BBL	38	26.8	.502	.395	.841	2.8	3.2	1.2	.1	15.1
2010–11	Galatasaray	BSL	16	23.3	.423	.405	.842	3.5	3.1	.9	.0	7.9
2010–11	Alba Berlin	BBL	27	24.3	.460	.381	.766	2.7	3.9	.8	.0	8.7
2011–12	Le Mans	Pro A	37	35.2	.564	.428	.893	3.4	6.4	.9	.1	16.3
2012–13	Baskonia	ACB	7	16.6	.529	.545	1.000	.7	2.6	.1	.0	6.1
2012–13	Biella	LBA	16	31.8	.570	.279	.921	2.1	2.6	1.2	.0	13.4
2013–14	Montepaschi Siena	LBA	13	18.8	.569	.222	.941	1.6	3.0	.5	.0	7.1
2014–15	Nizhny Novgorod	VTB	31	29.1	.543	.388	.899	3.2	5.3	.6	.0	14.7
