= KK Cibona in international competitions =

KK Cibona history and statistics in FIBA Europe and Euroleague Basketball (company) competitions.

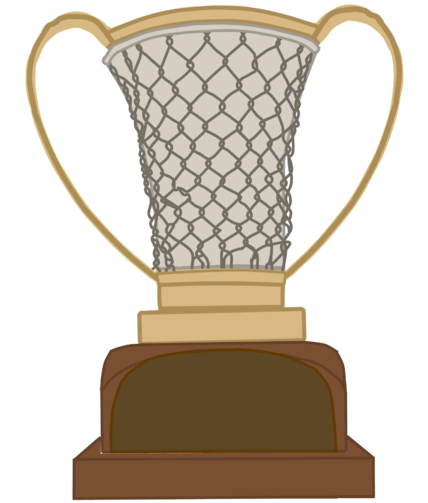
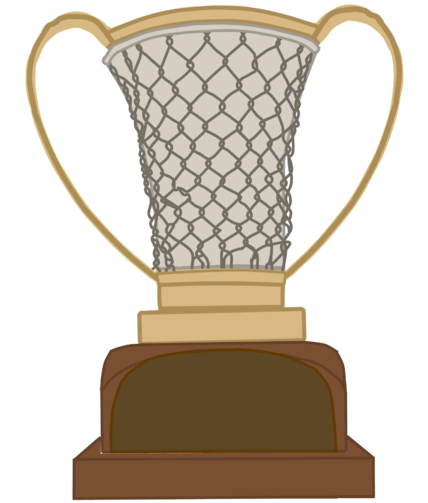
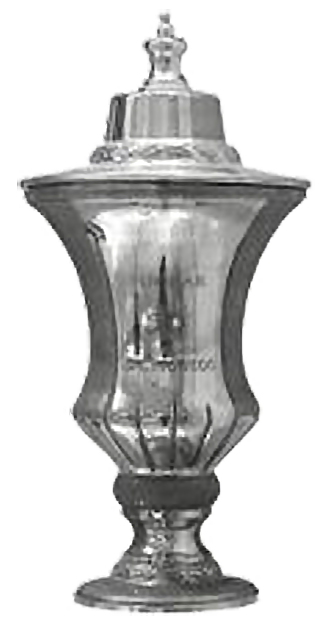
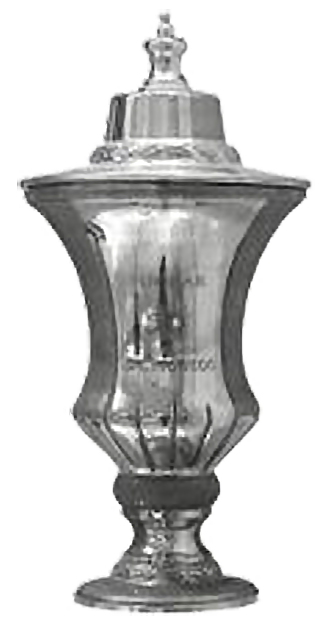

== European competitions ==
Record	Round	Opponent club			
1969–70 FIBA European Cup Winner's Cup 2nd–tier
1–3	2nd round	(Turkey) İTÜ	96–82 (h)	75–82 (a)	
1–3	QF	(Italy) Fides Napoli	80–89 (h)	84–102 (a)	
1972 FIBA Korać Cup 3rd–tier
5–1	QF	(France) Caen	109–83 (a)	103–87 (h)	
5–1	SF	(Belgium) Standard Liège	71–54 (h)	96–91 (a)	
5–1	F	(Socialist Federal Republic of Yugoslavia) OKK Beograd	71–83, February 29, Hala sportova, Belgrade; 94–73, March 7, SFK Trešnjevci, Zagreb		
1973 FIBA Korać Cup 3rd–tier
3–1	Top 12	(Greece) YMCA Thessaloniki	81–61 (h)	73–68 (a)	
3–1	Top 12	(Belgium) Maes Pils	92–115 (a)	87–82 (h)	
1977–78 FIBA Korać Cup 3rd–tier
5–3	1st round	(Israel) Hapoel Ramat Gan	83–85 (a)	109–103 (h)	
5–3	Top 16	(Poland) Resovia Rzeszów	88–62 (a)	83–74 (h)	
5–3	Top 16	(Italy) Cinzano Milano	88–87 (h)	90–102 (a)	
5–3	Top 16	(France) Moderne	74–96 (a)	114–99 (h)	
1978–79 FIBA Korać Cup 3rd–tier
5–3	2nd round	(England) Stockport Belgrade	104–76 (a)	115–73 (h)	
5–3	Top 16	(France) Orthez	82–68 (h)	88–76 (a)	
5–3	Top 16	(Italy) Arrigoni Rieti	79–74 (a)	71–73 (h)	
5–3	Top 16	(Czechoslovakia) Inter Slovnaft	68–83 (a)	78–79 (h)	
1979–80 FIBA Korać Cup 3rd–tier
8–3	2nd round	(Turkey) Ziraat Fakültesi	120–67 (a)	135–62 (h)	
8–3	Top 16	(Spain) Cotonificio	122–99 (h)	87–100 (a)	
8–3	Top 16	(France) Orthez	84–79 (h)	88–84 (a)	
8–3	Top 16	(West Germany) MTV Wolfenbüttel	82–75 (a)	113–94 (h)	
8–3	SF	(Israel) Hapoel Tel Aviv	80–81 (a)	92–80 (h)	
8–3	F	(Italy) Arrigoni Rieti	71–76; March 26, Country Hall du Sart Tilman, Liège		
1980–81 FIBA European Cup Winner's Cup 2nd–tier
9–3	1st round	(Iceland) Valur	110–79 (a)	120–90 (h)	
9–3	2nd round	(Austria) Klosterneuburg	84–74 (a)	84–75 (h)	
9–3	QF	(Soviet Union) Žalgiris	107–77 (h)	82–75 (a)	
9–3	QF	(Italy) Squibb Cantù	81–99 (a)	98–99 (h)	
9–3	QF	(France) Moderne	82–81 (a)	86–84 (h)	
9–3	SF	(Spain) FC Barcelona	85–92 (a)	79–75 (h)	
1981–82 FIBA European Cup Winner's Cup 2nd–tier
6–3	2nd round	Bye	Cibona qualified without games		
6–3	QF	(England) Sutton & Crystal Palace	105–97 (h)	74–70 (a)	
6–3	QF	(Italy) Sinudyne Bologna	121–91 (h)	81–88 (a)	
6–3	QF	(Israel) Hapoel Ramat Gan	81–85 (a)	98–97 (h)	
6–3	SF	(Soviet Union) Stroitel	66–82 (a)	92–66 (h)	
6–3	F	(Spain) Real Madrid	96–95; March 16, Salle Henri Simonet, Brussels		
1982–83 FIBA European Champions Cup 1st–tier
3–11	1st round	(Egypt) Union Récréation Alexandria	65–58 (a)	89–52 (h)	
3–11	2nd round	(Hungary) Honvéd	87–89 (a)	122–98 (h)	
3–11	SF	(Israel) Maccabi Elite Tel Aviv	81–108 (a)	87–94 (h)	
3–11	SF	(Italy) Ford Cantù	65–90 (h)	74–106 (a)	
3–11	SF	(Italy) Billy Milano	76–88 (a)	92–95 (h)	
3–11	SF	(Soviet Union) CSKA Moscow	82–99 (a)	78–95 (h)	
3–11	SF	(Spain) Real Madrid	89–110 (h)	68–99 (a)	
1983–84 FIBA European Cup Winner's Cup 2nd–tier
6–5 +1 draw	1st round	(Denmark) BMS	102–81 (a)	111–88 (h)	
6–5 +1 draw	2nd round	(Romania) Steaua București	82–82 (a)	93–84 (h)	
6–5 +1 draw	QF	(Italy) Simac Milano	84–80 (h)	69–82 (a)	
6–5 +1 draw	QF	(West Germany) Saturn Köln	82–71 (h)	90–92 (a)	
6–5 +1 draw	QF	(England) Solent Stars	92–77 (a)	78–84 (h)	
6–5 +1 draw	SF	(Spain) Real Madrid	89–91 (h)	80–94 (a)	
1984–85 FIBA European Champions Cup 1st–tier
11–4	1st round	(Bulgaria) CSKA Sofia	91–97 (a)	89–73 (h)	
11–4	2nd round	(Finland) NMKY Helsinki	88–83 (a)	102–95 (h)	
11–4	SF	(Spain) Real Madrid	99–90 (h)	89–87 (a)	
11–4	SF	(Italy) Granarolo Bologna	72–81 (a)	96–89 (h)	
11–4	SF	(Israel) Maccabi Elite Tel Aviv	88–77 (h)	87–88 (a)	
11–4	SF	(Italy) Banco di Roma Virtus	87–89 (a)	97–83 (h)	
11–4	SF	(Soviet Union) CSKA Moscow	95–77 (h)	71–65 (a)	
11–4	F	(Spain) Real Madrid	87–78; April 3, Peace and Friendship Stadium, Athens		
1985–86 FIBA European Champions Cup 1st–tier
12–3	1st round	(Turkey) Galatasaray	110–97 (a)	121–106 (h)	
12–3	2nd round	(Austria) Klosterneuburg	98–83 (a)	85–70 (h)	
12–3	SF	(Israel) Maccabi Elite Tel Aviv	90–86 (h)	102–105 (a)	
12–3	SF	(Italy) Simac Milano	111–95 (h)	66–90 (a)	
12–3	SF	(Soviet Union) Žalgiris	91–94 (a)	99–90 (h)	
12–3	SF	(Spain) Real Madrid	108–91 (a)	88–81 (h)	
12–3	SF	(France) Limoges	116–106 (h)	106–95 (a)	
12–3	F	(Soviet Union) Žalgiris	94–82; April 3, Sportcsarnok, Budapest		
1986–87 FIBA European Cup Winner's Cup 2nd–tier
9–0	2nd round	Bye	Cibona qualified without games		
9–0	QF	(Italy) Scavolini Pesaro	122–99 (h)	83–82 (a)	
9–0	QF	(Belgium) Maes Pils	121–99 (a)	130–90 (h)	
9–0	QF	(Turkey) Efes Pilsen	86–70 (a)	125–78 (h)	
9–0	SF	(France) ASVEL	98–82 (a)	109–93 (h)	
9–0	F	(Italy) Scavolini Pesaro	89–74; March 17, Dvorana SPC Vojvodina, Novi Sad		
1987–88 FIBA Korać Cup 3rd–tier
11–1	2nd round	(Finland) KTP	138–110 (h)	127–101 (a)	
11–1	QF	(England) Manchester United	112–82 (h)	99–93 (a)	
11–1	QF	Racing Club de France	81–64 (h)	84–79 (a)	
11–1	QF	(Italy) Snaidero Caserta	81–85 (a)	98–97 (h)	
11–1	SF	(Israel) Hapoel Tel Aviv	103–93 (a)	101–89 (h)	
11–1	F	(Spain) Real Madrid	89–102, March 1, Palacio de Deportes de la Comunidad de Madrid, Madrid; 94–93, March 9, Košarkaški centar Cibona, Zagreb		
1988–89 FIBA European Cup Winner's Cup 2nd–tier
6–4	2nd round	(Austria) Scholl Wels	97–71 (a)	110–77 (h)	
6–4	QF	(West Germany) Steiner Bayreuth	79–80 (h)	109–99 (a)	
6–4	QF	(Soviet Union) Žalgiris	101–104 (h)	98–97 (a)	
6–4	QF	(Greece) AEK	92–91 (a)	94–82 (h)	
6–4	SF	(Spain) Real Madrid	91–92 (h)	97–119 (a)	
1990–91 FIBA Korać Cup 3rd-tier
5–5	2nd round	(Soviet Union) SKA Alma-Ata	88–82 (a)	110–96 (h)	
5–5	Top 16	(Italy) Phonola Caserta	82–79 (h)	75–83 (a)	
5–5	Top 16	(Israel) Hapoel Tel Aviv	79–85 (a)	124–68 (h)	
5–5	Top 16	(West Germany) Charlottenburg	81–87 (h)	94–78 (a)	
5–5	QF	(Italy) Clear Cantù	70–80 (a)	77–80 (h)	
1991–92 FIBA European League 1st–tier
11–7	2nd round	(Iceland) UMFN	111–76 (a)	97–74 (h)	
11–7	Top 16	(Estonia) Kalev	91–80 (h)	99–86 (a)	
11–7	Top 16	(Spain) FC Barcelona	85–73 (a)	76–83 (h)	
11–7	Top 16	(Italy) Phonola Caserta	95–85 (h)	96–82 (a)	
11–7	Top 16	(France) Olympique Antibes	100–93 (a)	105–99 (h)	
11–7	Top 16	(Israel) Maccabi Elite Tel Aviv	97–101 (h)	60–69 (a)	
11–7	Top 16	(Italy) Knorr Bologna	87–74 (h)	97–94 (a)	
11–7	Top 16	(Croatia) Slobodna Dalmacija	89–96 (a)	110–117 (h)	
11–7	QF	(Spain) Montigalà Joventut	68–73 (h)	67–92 (a)	– (a)
1992–93 FIBA European League 1st–tier
6–8	2nd round	(Finland) NMKY Helsinki	83–87 (a)	109–88 (h)	
6–8	Top 16	(Italy) Knorr Bologna	82–66 (h)	69–109 (a)	
6–8	Top 16	(Spain) Joventut Marbella	82–86 (a)	84–81 (h)	
6–8	Top 16	(Israel) Maccabi Elite Tel Aviv	110–89 (a)	90–88 (h)	
6–8	Top 16	(Italy) Scavolini Pesaro	76–75 (h)	68–74 (a)	
6–8	Top 16	(France) Limoges	52–83 (a)	58–62 (h)	
6–8	Top 16	(Federal Republic of Yugoslavia) Partizan	Partizan withdrew without games		
6–8	Top 16	(Greece) PAOK	71–82 (h)	67–81 (a)	
1993–94 FIBA European League 1st–tier
11–5	2nd round	(Austria) UKJ SÜBA St. Pölten	85–78 (a)	94–78 (h)	
11–5	Top 16	(Italy) Buckler Bologna	86–114 (a)	78–76 (h)	
11–5	Top 16	(Greece) Panathinaikos	74–80 (h)	72–67 (a)	
11–5	Top 16	(Spain) 7up Joventut	60–75 (a)	74–82 (h)	
11–5	Top 16	(France) Pau-Orthez	91–80 (h)	106–81 (a)	
11–5	Top 16	(Portugal) Benfica	66–67 (a)	75–63 (h)	
11–5	Top 16	(Turkey) Efes Pilsen	75–69 (a)	72–57 (h)	
11–5	Top 16	(Italy) Clear Cantù	83–77 (h)	114–81 (a)	
1994–95 FIBA European League 1st–tier
10–8	2nd round	(Slovakia) Baník Cígeľ Prievidza	105–82 (a)	103–75 (h)	
10–8	Top 16	(France) Limoges	76–69 (h)	63–81 (a)	
10–8	Top 16	(Greece) Olympiacos	69–101 (a)	60–69 (h)	
10–8	Top 16	(Italy) Buckler Bologna	75–79 (h)	86–84 (a)	
10–8	Top 16	(Spain) 7up Joventut	71–69 (h)	63–60 (a)	
10–8	Top 16	(Spain) FC Barcelona	74–70 (a)	97–84 (h)	
10–8	Top 16	(Germany) Bayer 04 Leverkusen	84–94 (a)	90–74 (h)	
10–8	Top 16	(Turkey) Efes Pilsen	62–67 (a)	79–59 (h)	
10–8	QF	(Spain) Real Madrid	78–82 (h)	70–82 (a)	– (a)
1995–96 FIBA European League 1st–tier
8–8	2nd round	(Cyprus) APOEL	82–70 (a)	57–46 (h)	
8–8	Top 16	(Portugal) Benfica	79–65 (a)	64–59 (h)	
8–8	Top 16	(Italy) Buckler Bologna	79–72 (h)	73–95 (a)	
8–8	Top 16	(Greece) Panathinaikos	61–79 (a)	82–93 (h)	
8–8	Top 16	(Spain) Real Madrid	78–81 (a)	64–59 (h)	
8–8	Top 16	(Spain) FC Barcelona	74–59 (h)	66–76 (a)	
8–8	Top 16	(Israel) Maccabi Elite Tel Aviv	75–78 (a)	71–78 (h)	
8–8	Top 16	(France) Pau-Orthez	83–78 (h)	62–80 (a)	
1996–97 FIBA EuroLeague 1st–tier
11–8	1st round	(Spain) Estudiantes Argentaria	81–66 (h)	77–78 (a)	
11–8	1st round	(Belgium) Spirou	77–73 (a)	75–66 (h)	
11–8	1st round	(Germany) Alba Berlin	78–68 (h)	71–79 (a)	
11–8	1st round	(Greece) Olympiacos	61–62 (a)	63–61 (h)	
11–8	1st round	(Italy) Teamsystem Bologna	64–72 (h)	66–54 (a)	
11–8	2nd round	(Turkey) Ülker	77–73 (a)	82–81 (h)	
11–8	2nd round	(Greece) Panionios Afisorama	85–58 (h)	76–84 (a)	
11–8	2nd round	(France) Limoges	61–85 (a)	72–66 (h)	
11–8	Top 16	(Slovenia) Smelt Olimpija	61–58 (h)	66–69 (a)	61–62 (h)
1997–98 FIBA EuroLeague 1st–tier
10–8	1st round	(Slovenia) Union Olimpija	78–75 (h)	76–59 (a)	
10–8	1st round	(Italy) Teamsystem Bologna	87–92 (h)	75–77 (a)	
10–8	1st round	(Germany) Alba Berlin	73–74 (a)	98–84 (h)	
10–8	1st round	(Greece) AEK	55–70 (a)	67–63 (h)	
10–8	1st round	(France) PSG Racing	61–73 (h)	71–65 (a)	
10–8	2nd round	(Federal Republic of Yugoslavia) Partizan	78–70 (a)	84–66 (h)	
10–8	2nd round	(Israel) Hapoel Jerusalem	81–79 (h)	88–83 (a)	
10–8	2nd round	(Turkey) Ülker	82–88 (a)	91–86 (h)	
10–8	Top 16	(Turkey) Efes Pilsen	59–75 (a)	98–102 (h)	– (a)
1998–99 FIBA EuroLeague 1st–tier
9–10	1st round	(Federal Republic of Yugoslavia) Crvena zvezda	69–66 (a)	77–80 (h)	
9–10	1st round	(Spain) TDK Manresa	54–61 (h)	79–67 (a)	
9–10	1st round	(Greece) Panathinaikos	61–69 (h)	70–83 (a)	
9–10	1st round	(Turkey) Efes Pilsen	57–80 (a)	76–70 (h)	
9–10	1st round	(Israel) Maccabi Elite Tel Aviv	57–76 (a)	78–60 (h)	
9–10	2nd round	(France) Pau-Orthez	66–56 (h)	79–76 (a)	
9–10	2nd round	(Turkey) Fenerbahçe	61–66 (a)	85–84 (h)	
9–10	2nd round	(Lithuania) Žalgiris	71–79 (h)	74–64 (a)	
9–10	Top 16	(France) ASVEL	63–95 (a)	79–68 (h)	70–74 (a)
1999–00 FIBA EuroLeague 1st–tier
12–9	1st round	(Italy) Paf Wennington Bologna	78–92 (a)	71–61 (h)	
12–9	1st round	(Federal Republic of Yugoslavia) Budućnost	69–63 (h)	90–95 (a)	
12–9	1st round	(France) Pau-Orthez	82–75 (a)	71–69 (h)	
12–9	1st round	(Spain) Caja San Fernando	93–87 (h)	59–79 (a)	
12–9	1st round	(Turkey) Efes Pilsen	71–69 (a)	60–69 (h)	
12–9	2nd round	(Italy) Varese Roosters	77–89 (a)	75–59 (h)	
12–9	2nd round	(Turkey) Ülker	64–81 (h)	72–71 (a)	
12–9	2nd round	(Slovenia) Pivovarna Laško	81–68 (a)	88–80 (h)	
12–9	Top 16	(Russia) CSKA Moscow	75–72 (a)	55–75 (h)	78–69 (a)
12–9	QF	(Greece) Panathinaikos	62–73 (a)	63–69 (h)	– (a)
2000–01 Euroleague 1st–tier
3–9	Regular season	(Spain) Tau Cerámica	62–60 (h)	66–92 (a)	
3–9	Regular season	(Italy) Kinder Bologna	88–106 (a)	69–78 (h)	
3–9	Regular season	(Russia) Saint Petersburg Lions	75–70 (h)	90–92 (a)	
3–9	Regular season	(Greece) AEK	75–83 (a)	72–81 (h)	
3–9	Regular season	(Belgium) Spirou	85–70 (h)	91–100 (a)	
3–9	Top 16	(Italy) Paf Wennington Bologna	64–76 (a)	74–75 (h)	– (a)
2001–02 Euroleague 1st–tier
5–9	Regular season	(Spain) Tau Cerámica	96–95 (h)	58–81 (a)	
5–9	Regular season	(Italy) Scavolini Pesaro	75–88 (a)	71–74 (h)	
5–9	Regular season	(Belgium) Telindus Oostende	85–76 (h)	84–74 (a)	
5–9	Regular season	(Russia) Ural Great Perm	66–85 (a)	102–97 (h)	
5–9	Regular season	(Federal Republic of Yugoslavia) Partizan ICN	76–81 (a)	85–71 (h)	
5–9	Regular season	(France) ASVEL	70–82 (h)	84–99 (a)	
5–9	Regular season	(Greece) AEK	69–72 (a)	89–90 (h)	
2002–03 Euroleague 1st–tier
9–11	Regular season	(Greece) AEK	85–71 (h)	71–69 (a)	
9–11	Regular season	(France) Pau-Orthez	74–77 (a)	66–62 (h)	
9–11	Regular season	(Turkey) Efes Pilsen	64–56 (h)	57–91 (a)	
9–11	Regular season	(Italy) Benetton Treviso	82–96 (h)	71–100 (a)	
9–11	Regular season	(Germany) Alba Berlin	70–84 (a)	90–72 (h)	
9–11	Regular season	(Spain) FC Barcelona	94–77 (h)	82–104 (a)	
9–11	Regular season	(Italy) Skipper Bologna	71–76 (a)	89–83 (h)	
9–11	Top 16	(Turkey) Efes Pilsen	62–68 (a)	82–75 (h)	
9–11	Top 16	(Russia) CSKA Moscow	69–79 (a)	59–101 (h)	
9–11	Top 16	(Spain) Unicaja	88–81 (h)	87–95 (a)	
2003–04 Euroleague 1st–tier
10–10	Regular season	(France) Pau-Orthez	72–71 (h)	89–105 (a)	
10–10	Regular season	(Spain) FC Barcelona	60–77 (a)	74–68 (h)	
10–10	Regular season	(Greece) AEK	85–80 (h)	75–73 (a)	
10–10	Regular season	(Serbia and Montenegro) Partizan Mobtel	81–93 (a)	92–69 (h)	
10–10	Regular season	(Turkey) Ülker	94–83 (h)	70–76 (a)	
10–10	Regular season	(Italy) Lottomatica Roma	72–80 (a)	82–55 (h)	
10–10	Regular season	(Slovenia) Union Olimpija	95–86 (h)	81–85 (a)	
10–10	Top 16	(Spain) Tau Cerámica	72–78 (h)	76–95 (a)	
10–10	Top 16	(Russia) CSKA Moscow	61–68 (a)	81–72 (h)	
10–10	Top 16	(Greece) Olympiacos	62–68 (h)	70–68 (a)	
2004–05 Euroleague 1st–tier
9–11	Regular season	(Spain) Real Madrid	70–69 (a)	73–58 (h)	
9–11	Regular season	(Greece) Olympiacos	60–64 (h)	83–89 (a)	
9–11	Regular season	(Turkey) Efes Pilsen	70–72 (a)	82–72 (h)	
9–11	Regular season	(Spain) Adecco Estudiantes	85–78 (h)	87–81 (a)	
9–11	Regular season	(Italy) Climamio Bologna	88–99 (a)	89–96 (h)	
9–11	Regular season	(Serbia and Montenegro) Partizan Pivara MB	81–78 (a)	85–76 (h)	
9–11	Regular season	(Poland) Prokom Trefl Sopot	88–57 (h)	78–83 (a)	
9–11	Top 16	(Italy) Montepaschi Siena	62–90 (a)	78–73 (h)	
9–11	Top 16	(Turkey) Ülker	77–84 (a)	64–68 (h)	
9–11	Top 16	(Israel) Maccabi Elite Tel Aviv	74–91 (h)	75–83 (a)	
2005–06 Euroleague 1st–tier
9–11	Regular season	(Lithuania) Lietuvos rytas	68–57 (h)	52–80 (a)	
9–11	Regular season	(Poland) Prokom Trefl Sopot	64–80 (a)	71–61 (h)	
9–11	Regular season	(Israel) Maccabi Elite Tel Aviv	74–83 (a)	66–94 (h)	
9–11	Regular season	(Italy) Armani Jeans Milano	67–60 (h)	64–84 (a)	
9–11	Regular season	(Spain) Winterthur FC Barcelona	53–97 (a)	57–77 (h)	
9–11	Regular season	(Greece) Olympiacos	74–62 (h)	70–99 (a)	
9–11	Regular season	(Turkey) Efes Pilsen	77–71 (a)	60–49 (h)	
9–11	Top 16	(Greece) Panathinaikos	72–70 (h)	69–88 (a)	
9–11	Top 16	(Turkey) Efes Pilsen	69–63 (a)	77–84 (h)	
9–11	Top 16	(Italy) Benetton Treviso	91–80 (h)	80–88 (a)	
2006–07 Euroleague 1st–tier
6–8	Regular season	(Slovenia) Union Olimpija	77–61 (h)	88–92 (a)	
6–8	Regular season	(Greece) Panathinaikos	69–86 (a)	75–78 (h)	
6–8	Regular season	(Spain) Unicaja	87–83 (h)	67–73 (a)	
6–8	Regular season	(Serbia) Partizan	92–101 (a)	89–72 (h)	
6–8	Regular season	(Israel) Maccabi Elite Tel Aviv	87–82 (h)	83–91 (a)	
6–8	Regular season	(Spain) DKV Joventut	73–83 (a)	77–74 (h)	
6–8	Regular season	(Italy) Lottomatica Roma	91–84 (h)	58–81 (a)	
2007–08 Euroleague 1st–tier
4–10	Regular season	(Turkey) Efes Pilsen	93–85 (h)	74–100 (a)	
4–10	Regular season	(Spain) Unicaja	64–102 (a)	62–76 (h)	
4–10	Regular season	(Greece) Aris TT Bank	73–77 (a)	76–83 (h)	
4–10	Regular season	(Italy) Armani Jeans Milano	100–91 (h)	72–63 (a)	
4–10	Regular season	(Israel) Maccabi Elite Tel Aviv	74–80 (a)	76–81 (h)	
4–10	Regular season	(France) Le Mans	91–71 (h)	87–100 (a)	
4–10	Regular season	(Lithuania) Lietuvos rytas	59–93 (a)	79–86 (h)	
2008–09 Euroleague 1st–tier
7–9	Regular season	(Israel) Maccabi Electra Tel Aviv	81–79 (h)	83–88 (a)	
7–9	Regular season	(France) Le Mans	58–54 (a)	89–70 (h)	
7–9	Regular season	(Greece) Olympiacos	85–76 (h)	64–93 (a)	
7–9	Regular season	(Spain) Unicaja	67–77 (a)	76–77 (h)	
7–9	Regular season	(Italy) Air Avellino	82–79 (h)	75–79 (a)	
7–9	Top 16	(Italy) Montepaschi Siena	88–81 (h)	70–86 (a)	
7–9	Top 16	(Russia) CSKA Moscow	61–87 (a)	63–73 (h)	
7–9	Top 16	(Turkey) Fenerbahçe Ülker	55–65 (h)	86–64 (a)	
2009–10 Euroleague 1st–tier
4–12	Regular season	(Italy) Montepaschi Siena	40–85 (h)	64–90 (a)	
4–12	Regular season	(Spain) Regal FC Barcelona	59–81 (a)	66–80 (h)	
4–12	Regular season	(Turkey) Fenerbahçe Ülker	62–67 (a)	80–77 (h)	
4–12	Regular season	(Lithuania) Žalgiris	64–52 (h)	61–68 (a)	
4–12	Regular season	(France) ASVEL	68–71 (a)	73–71 (h)	
4–12	Top 16	(Russia) Khimki	70–83 (a)	82–63 (h)	
4–12	Top 16	(Spain) Caja Laboral	75–78 (h)	90–102 (a)	
4–12	Top 16	(Greece) Olympiacos	75–78 (a)	94–97 (h)	
2010–11 Euroleague 1st–tier
0–10	Regular season	(Spain) Regal FC Barcelona	66–80 (a)	75–94 (h)	
0–10	Regular season	(Turkey) Fenerbahçe Ülker	68–73 (h)	70–100 (a)	
0–10	Regular season	(Italy) Montepaschi Siena	57–80 (a)	66–82 (h)	
0–10	Regular season	(France) Cholet	71–84 (h)	65–81 (a)	
0–10	Regular season	(Lithuania) Lietuvos rytas	62–90 (a)	77–94 (h)	
2011–12 Euroleague 1st–tier
1–1	1st round	(France) Cholet	77–70; September 29, Siemens Arena, Qualification tournament, Vilnius		
1–1	2nd round	(Lithuania) Lietuvos rytas	71–88; October 1, Siemens Arena, Qualification tournament, Vilnius		
2011–12 Eurocup 2nd–tier
0–6	Regular season	(France) Gravelines	71–101 (h)	77–81 (a)	
0–6	Regular season	(Israel) Hapoel Migdal	73–89 (a)	78–86 (h)	
0–6	Regular season	(Ukraine) Donetsk	81–98 (a)	76–78 (h)	
2012–13 Eurocup 2nd–tier
0–6	Regular season	(Russia) Spartak Saint Petersburg	56–64 (h)	60–93 (a)	
0–6	Regular season	(Germany) Ratiopharm Ulm	68–83 (a)	81–86 (h)	
0–6	Regular season	(France) Cholet	90–95 (h)	59–79 (a)	
2013–14 Eurocup 2nd–tier
1–9	Regular season	(France) Le Mans	76–78 (h)	64–53 (a)	
1–9	Regular season	(Czech Republic) ČEZ Nymburk	76–84 (a)	77–84 (h)	
1–9	Regular season	(Germany) Artland Dragons	77–87 (h)	96–101 (a)	
1–9	Regular season	(Belgium) Telenet Oostende	75–77 (a)	82–85 (h)	
1–9	Regular season	(Italy) FoxTown Cantù	79–86 (h)	68–92 (a)	
2015–16 FIBA Europe Cup 3rd–tier
10–7	Regular season	(Portugal) Benfica	83–79 (a)	74–66 (h)	
10–7	Regular season	(Belgium) Port of Antwerp Giants	78–92 (h)	69–82 (a)	
10–7	Regular season	(Hungary) Soproni	77–63 (h)	72–91 (a)	
10–7	Top 32	(Romania) Energia Târgu Jiu	93–88 (h)	81–85 (a)	
10–7	Top 32	(Lithuania) Pieno žvaigždės	95–90 (a)	82–84 (h)	
10–7	Top 32	(France) Le Havre	106–113 (h)	93–92 (a)	
10–7	Top 16	(Lithuania) Juventus	83–78 (a)	87–84 (h)	– (a)
10–7	QF	(Russia) Enisey Krasnoyarsk	92–94 (a)	77–69 (h)	78–82 (a)
2016–17 Basketball Champions League 3rd–tier
5–9	Regular season	(Spain) Iberostar Tenerife	57–85 (h)	84–106 (a)	
5–9	Regular season	(Serbia) Mega Leks	79–81 (a)	87–77 (h)	
5–9	Regular season	(Italy) Sidigas Avellino	83–84 (h)	57–75 (a)	
5–9	Regular season	(Montenegro) Mornar Bar	90–72 (h)	92–81 (a)	
5–9	Regular season	(Lithuania) Juventus Utena	82–104 (a)	81–72 (h)	
5–9	Regular season	(France) SIG Strasbourg	93–88 (h)	56–71 (a)	
5–9	Regular season	(Belgium) Telenet Oostende	70–82 (a)	71–77 (h)	
2016–17 FIBA Europe Cup 4th–tier
3–1	Top 16	(Poland) Stelmet Zielona Gora	81–69 (a)	102–83 (h)	
3–1	QF	(France) Élan Chalon	87-85 (h)	78–83 (a)	

== Worldwide competitions ==
Record	Round	Opponent club	
1985 FIBA Club World Cup
4–2	Group stage	(Philippines) Northern Cement	111–86; June 23, Girona
4–2	Group stage	(United States) Golden Eagles	81–79; June 25, Girona
4–2	Group stage	(Brazil) Monte Líbano	92–88; June 26, Girona
4–2	Group stage	(Italy) Banco di Roma Virtus	98–101; June 27, Girona
4–2	SF	(Spain) FC Barcelona	68–74; June 28, Palau Blaugrana, Barcelona
4–2	3rd place game	(Argentina) San Andrés	109–82; June 29, Palau Blaugrana, Barcelona
1986 FIBA Club World Cup
4–1	Group stage	(Brazil) Corinthians	114–87; September 9, Estadio Obras Sanitarias, Buenos Aires
4–1	Group stage	(United States) Continental-Coors All-Stars	127–82; September 10, Estadio Obras Sanitarias, Buenos Aires
4–1	Group stage	(Argentina) Obras Sanitarias	110–92; September 11, Estadio Obras Sanitarias, Buenos Aires
4–1	SF	(Soviet Union) Žalgiris	77–104; September 13, Estadio Obras Sanitarias, Buenos Aires
4–1	3rd place game	(Brazil) Corinthians	119–96; September 14, Estadio Obras Sanitarias, Buenos Aires
1987 FIBA Club World Cup
4–1	Group stage	(Israel) Maccabi Elite Tel Aviv	101–83; September 16, Palatrussardi, Milan
4–1	Group stage	(Brazil) Monte Líbano	97–87; September 17, Palatrussardi, Milan
4–1	Group stage	(Soviet Union) Žalgiris	116–113; September 18, Palatrussardi, Milan
4–1	SF	(Italy) Tracer Milano	83–94; September 19, Palatrussardi, Milan
4–1	3rd place game	(Israel) Maccabi Elite Tel Aviv	106–96; September 20, Palatrussardi, Milan

== Record ==
KK Cibona has from 1969 to 1970 (first participation): 271 wins against 263 defeats plus 1 draws in 535 games for all the European club competitions.

- EuroLeague: 181–200 (381)
  - FIBA Saporta Cup: 38–18, 1 draw (57) / EuroCup Basketball: 1–21 (22)
    - FIBA Korać Cup: 42–17 (59) /// FIBA Europe Cup: 10–7 (17)

Also KK Cibona has a 12–4 record in the FIBA Intercontinental Cup.

== See also ==
- Yugoslav basketball clubs in European competitions
