= 2013–14 Lega Basket Serie A =

Lega Basket Serie A
- Season: 2013–14
- Duration: October 13, 2013 – June 27, 2014
- Games played: 30
- Teams: 16

Regular season
- Top seed: EA7 Emporio Armani Milano
- Season MVP: (United States) Drake Diener
- Relegated: Sutor Montegranaro

Finals
- Champions: EA7 Emporio Armani Milano (26th title)
- Runners-up: Montepaschi Siena
- Semifinalists: Banco di Sardegna Sassari; Acea Virtus Roma
- Finals MVP: (Italy) Alessandro Gentile

Statistical leaders
Points	(United States) Drake Diener	19.4
Rebounds	(United States) O. D. Anosike	13.1
Assists	(Italy) Andrea Cinciarini	6.5

Records
- Highest attendance: 12,926; EA7 Milano 74-67 Siena (27 June 2014)
- Average attendance: 4,060

The 2013–14 Lega Basket Serie A was the 92nd season of the Lega Basket Serie A.

The regular season ran from October 13, 2013 to May 11, 2014 and consisted of 30 games. The top 8 teams made the play-offs, the lowest ranked team, Sutor Montegranaro, were relegated to Serie A2 Gold.

EA7 Emporio Armani won its 26th championship and their first national title since 1996, ending Montepaschi Siena's streak of Serie A titles at seven.

== Arena standards ==
Starting from the 2013-14 season all clubs must play in arenas that seat at least 5,000 people. However 8 teams that did not have arenas of that size were allowed for this season to play in their old arenas with improvements.

== Teams ==
Team	City	Arena	Capacity
Acea Roma	Rome	Palazzetto dello Sport	3,500
Acqua Vitasnella Cantù	Cantù	Palasport Pianella	3,910
Banco di Sardegna Sassari	Sassari	Palasport Roberta Serradimigni	5,000
Cimberio Varese	Varese	PalaWhirlpool	5,100
Emporio Armani Milano	Milan	Mediolanum Forum	11,210
Enel Brindisi	Brindisi	PalaPentassuglia	3,534
Giorgio Tesi Group Pistoia	Pistoia	PalaFermi	4,000
Granarolo Bologna	Bologna	Unipol Arena	9,200
Grissin Bon Reggio Emilia	Reggio Emilia	PalaBigi	3,500
Montepaschi Siena	Siena	Palasport Mens Sana	5,070
Pasta Reggia Caserta	Caserta	PalaMaggiò	6,387
Sidigas Avellino	Avellino	Palasport Del Mauro	5,195
Sutor Montegranaro	Montegranaro	PalaSavelli	3,608
Umana Venezia	Venezia	Palasport Taliercio	3,509
Vanoli Cremona	Cremona	Palasport Mario Radi	3,527
Victoria Libertas Pesaro	Pesaro	Adriatic Arena	6,119

Lega Basket 2013–14 – Club Locations

== Regular season ==
Pos	Teams	P	W	L	PF	PA	Qualification or relegation
1	EA7 Emporio Armani Milano	30	25	5	2452	2134	Playoffs
2	Montepaschi Siena	30	20	10	2308	2114	Playoffs
3	Acqua Vitasnella Cantù	30	20	10	2432	2290	Playoffs
4	Banco di Sardegna Sassari	30	18	12	2589	2400	Playoffs
5	Enel Brindisi	30	18	12	2286	2242	Playoffs
6	Acea Roma	30	17	13	2357	2350	Playoffs
7	Grissin Bon Reggio Emilia	30	15	15	2341	2236	Playoffs
8	Giorgio Tesi Group Pistoia	30	15	15	2296	2323	Playoffs
9	Pasta Reggia Caserta	30	15	15	2189	2175	
10	Cimberio Varese	30	13	17	2389	2458	
11	Umana Venezia	30	12	18	2394	2420	
12	Sidigas Avellino	30	12	18	2291	2419	
13	Granarolo Bologna	30	11	19	2335	2376	
14	Vanoli Cremona	30	11	19	2285	2464	
15	Victoria Libertas Pesaro	30	9	21	2360	2623	
16	Sutor Montegranaro	30	9	21	2328	2608	Relegation to Serie A2 Gold

== Individual Statistics, Regular Season ==
=== Points ===
Rank	Name	Team	PPG
1.	(United States) Drake Diener	Banco di Sardegna Sassari	19.4
2.	(United States) Keith Langford	EA7 Emporio Armani Milano	18.0
3.	(United States) Caleb Green	Banco di Sardegna Sassari	17.6
4.	(United States) Andre Smith	Umana Venezia	17.4
5.	(United States) Jason Rich	Vanoli Cremona	17.3

=== Assists ===
Rank	Name	Team	APG
1.	(Italy) Andrea Cinciarini	Grissin Bon Reggio Emilia	6.5
2.	(Italy) Travis Diener	Banco di Sardegna Sassari	5.2
3.	(United States) Brad Wanamaker	Giorgio Tesi Group Pistoia	5.0
4.	(North Macedonia) Marques Green	Banco di Sardegna Sassari	4.6
5.	(United States) Stefhon Hannah	Pasta Reggia Caserta	4.2

=== Rebounds ===
Rank	Name	Team	RPG
1.	(Nigeria) (United States) O. D. Anosike	Victoria Libertas Pesaro	13.1
2.	(Nigeria) (United States) Trevor Mbakwe	Acea Roma	9.3
3.	(Bulgaria) Kaloyan Ivanov	Sidigas Avellino	9.1
4.	(United States) Ed Daniel	Giorgio Tesi Group Pistoia	7.9
5.	(Guyana) (United States) Delroy James	Enel Brindisi	7.8

=== Steals ===
Rank	Name	Team	SPG
1.	(Georgia (country)) Quinton Hosley	Acea Roma	2.1
2.	(North Macedonia) Marques Green	Banco di Sardegna Sassari	1.8
3.	(United States) Brad Wanamaker	Giorgio Tesi Group Pistoia	1.8
4.	(United States) Stefhon Hannah	Pasta Reggia Caserta	1.7
5.	(Italy) (Argentina) Bernardo Musso	Victoria Libertas Pesaro	1.7

=== Blocks ===
Rank	Name	Team	BPG
1.	(Nigeria) (United States) Trevor Mbakwe	Acea Roma	1.6
2.	(United States) JaJuan Johnson	Giorgio Tesi Group Pistoia	1.5
3.	(Saint Vincent and the Grenadines) Shawn King	Granorolo Bologna	1.3
4.	(Guyana) (United States) Delroy James	Enel Brindisi	1.3
5.	(Italy) Marco Cusin	Acqua Vitasnella Cantù	1.2

=== Valuation ===
Rank	Name	Team	VPG
1.	(Nigeria) (United States) O. D. Anosike	Victoria Libertas Pesaro	22.8
2.	(United States) Drake Diener	Banco di Sardegna Sassari	20.7
3.	(United States) Matt Walsh	Granorolo Bologna	20.3
4.	(United States) Brad Wanamaker	Giorgio Tesi Group Pistoia	20.0
5.	(Bulgaria) Kaloyan Ivanov	Sidigas Avellino	19.9

== Play-offs ==
Quarterfinals
1	EA7 Emporio Armani Milano	3
8	Giorgio Tesi Group Pistoia	2
4	Banco di Sardegna Sassari	3
5	Enel Brindisi	0
2	Montepaschi Siena	3
7	Grissin Bon Reggio Emilia	2
3	Acqua Vitasnella Cantù	0
6	Acea Roma	3

Semifinals
1	EA7 Emporio Armani Milano	4
4	Banco di Sardegna Sassari	2
2	Montepaschi Siena	4
6	Acea Roma	1

Finals
1	EA7 Emporio Armani Milano	4
2	Montepaschi Siena	3

=== EA7 Emporio Armani Milano vs. Giorgio Tesi Group Pistoia ===
19 May
20:30

Boxscore

EA7 Emporio Armani Milano 73, Giorgio Tesi Group Pistoia 59
Scoring by quarter: 20–14, 15–14, 18–20, 20–11
Pts: Nicolò Melli 18; Rebs: Kangur, Melli 6 Asts: Alessandro Gentile 6	Pts: Brad Wanamaker 20; Rebs: Deron Washington 11; Asts: Brad Wanamaker 2

Mediolanum Forum, Milan
Referees: Gianluca Mattioli, Mark Bartoli, Michele Rossi

21 May
20:30

Boxscore

EA7 Emporio Armani Milano 87, Giorgio Tesi Group Pistoia 67
Scoring by quarter: 22–21, 17–17, 24–17, 24–12
Pts: Alessandro Gentile 19; Rebs: Moss, Samuels 6 Asts: Daniel Hackett 5	Pts: JaJuan Johnson 14; Rebs: Ed Daniel 5 Asts: Kyle Gibson 5

Mediolanum Forum, Milan
Referees: Guerrino Cerebuch, Tolga Sahin, Luca Weidmann

23 May
20:40

Boxscore

Giorgio Tesi Group Pistoia 82, EA7 Emporio Armani Milano 71
Scoring by quarter: 19–15, 16–30, 25–11, 22–15
Pts: Kyle Gibson 20; Rebs: JaJuan Johnson 8 Asts: Bradley Wanamaker 4	Pts: Daniel Hackett 21; Rebs: Samardo Samuels 8 Asts: Samardo Samuels 2

PalaFermi, Pistoia
Referees: Alessandro Martolini, Gabriele Bettini, Michele Rossi

25 May
20:40

Boxscore

Giorgio Tesi Group Pistoia 84, EA7 Emporio Armani Milano 82
Scoring by quarter: 19–18, 7–24, 36–17, 22–23
Pts: Bradley Wanamaker 28; Rebs: JaJuan Johnson 10; Asts: Cortese, Wanamaker 1	Pts: Keith Langford 28; Rebs: Samardo Samuels 7 Asts: Keith Langford 3

PalaFermi, Pistoia
Referees: Tolga Sahin, Lorenzo Baldini, Alessandro Terreni

27 May
20:30

Boxscore

EA7 Emporio Armani Milano 88, Giorgio Tesi Group Pistoia 78
Scoring by quarter: 17–15, 22–25, 24–13, 25–25
Pts: Daniel Hackett 20; Rebs: Samardo Samuels 8 Asts: Daniel Hackett 4	Pts: Kyle Gibson 20; Rebs: Ed Daniel 9 Asts: Bradley Wanamaker 5
Milano wins series 3–2

Mediolanum Forum, Milan
Referees: Luigi Lamonica, Gianluca Mattioli, Roberto Begnis

=== Banco di Sardegna Sassari vs. Enel Brindisi ===
19 May
20:30

Boxscore

Banco di Sardegna Sassari 75, Enel Brindisi 73
Scoring by quarter: 17–20, 15–20, 18–20, 25–13
Pts: Caleb Green 18; Rebs: Caleb Green 10; Asts: Travis Diener 6	Pts: Jerome Dyson 29; Rebs: Folarin Campbell 8 Asts: Campbell, Dyson 4

Palasport Roberta Serradimigni, Sassari
Referees: Luigi Lamonica, Gianluca Sardella, Fabrizio Paglialunga

21 May
20:30

Boxscore

Banco di Sardegna Sassari 89, Enel Brindisi 62
Scoring by quarter: 31–13, 22–18, 23–9, 13–22
Pts: Drake Diener 31; Rebs: Benjamin Eze 8 Asts: Travis Diener 10	Pts: three players 11; Rebs: David Chiotti 7 Asts: three players 2

Palasport Roberta Serradimigni, Sassari
Referees: Saverio Lanzarini, Carmelo Paternico, Denny Borgioni

23 May
20:30

Boxscore

Enel Brindisi 75, Banco di Sardegna Sassari 82
Scoring by quarter: 19–22, 13–17, 28–11, 15–32
Pts: Jerome Dyson 22; Rebs: Folarin Campbell 12; Asts: Delroy James 4	Pts: Caleb Green 17; Rebs: Caleb Green 7 Asts: Travis Diener 4
Sassari wins series 3–0

PalaPentassuglia, Brindisi
Referees: Roberto Begnis, Roberto Chiari, Gianluca Calbucci

=== Montepaschi Siena vs. Grissin Bon Reggio Emilia ===
20 May
20:30

Boxscore

Montepaschi Siena 82, Grissin Bon Reggio Emilia 85
Scoring by quarter: 13–28, 27–22, 15–22, 27–13
Pts: Marquez Haynes 22; Rebs: Othello Hunter 8 Asts: three players 4	Pts: James White 22; Rebs: James White 8 Asts: Rimantas Kaukėnas 5

Palasport Mens Sana, Siena
Referees: Roberto Begnis, Alessandro Vicino, Gianluca Calbucci

22 May
21:05

Boxscore

Montepaschi Siena 88, Grissin Bon Reggio Emilia 84
Scoring by quarter: 25–15, 22–17, 17–13, 24–39
Pts: Erick Green 20; Rebs: Spencer Nelson 7 Asts: Marquez Haynes 6	Pts: James White 20; Rebs: James White 7 Asts: James White 4

Palasport Mens Sana, Siena
Referees: Manuel Mazzoni, Roberto Chiari, Maurizio Biggi

23 May
20:30

Boxscore

Grissin Bon Reggio Emilia 82, Montepaschi Siena 74
Scoring by quarter: 15–13, 14–17, 20–19, 33–25
Pts: James White 20; Rebs: James White 8 Asts: Andrea Cinciarini 5	Pts: Josh Carter 20; Rebs: Spencer Nelson 8 Asts: Haynes, Nelson 2

PalaBigi, Reggio Emilia
Referees: Paolo Taurino, Massimiliano Filippini, Carmelo Lo Guzzo

25 May
20:30

Boxscore

Grissin Bon Reggio Emilia 81, Montepaschi Siena 85
Scoring by quarter: 23–35, 29–14, 14–19, 15–17
Pts: Troy Bell 18; Rebs: Troy Bell 7 Asts: Andrea Cinciarini 7

PalaBigi, Reggio Emilia
Referees: Guerrino Cerebuch, Luca Weidmann, Maurizio Biggi

27 May
20:30

Boxscore

Montepaschi Siena 84, Grissin Bon Reggio Emilia 79
Scoring by quarter: 18–19, 22–14, 21–19, 23–27
Pts: Marquez Haynes 20; Rebs: Tomas Ress 6 Asts: Marquez Haynes 9	Pts: James White 21; Rebs: Cinciarini, White 7 Asts: Andrea Cinciarini 4
Siena wins series 3–1

Palasport Mens Sana, Siena
Referees: Saverio Lanzarini, Carmelo Paternico, Alessandro Martolini

=== Acqua Vitasnella Cantù vs. Acea Roma ===
20 May
20:30

Boxscore

Acqua Vitasnella Cantù 71, Acea Roma 75
Scoring by quarter: 17–16, 19–16, 12–20, 23–23
Pts: Michael Jenkins 19; Rebs: Marco Cusin 8 Asts: Pietro Aradori 5	Pts: Jones, Mbakwe 14; Rebs: Trevor Mbakwe 11; Asts: Baron, Goss 3

Palasport Pianella, Cantù
Referees: Paolo Taurino, Gabriele Bettini, Alessandro Terreni

22 May
20:30

Boxscore

Acqua Vitasnella Cantù 62, Acea Roma 64
Scoring by quarter: 19–22, 20–17, 13–13, 10–12
Pts: Joe Ragland 17; Rebs: Adrian Uter 12; Asts: Joe Ragland 4	Pts: Quinton Hosley 16; Rebs: Trevor Mbakwe 11; Asts: four players 2

Palasport Pianella, Cantù
Referees: Lorenzo Baldini, Enrico Sabetta, Emanuele Aronne

24 May
20:30

Boxscore

Acea Roma 74, Acqua Vitasnella Cantù 70 (OT)
Scoring by quarter: 14–11, 17–20, 15–10, 13–18, Overtime: 15–11
Pts: Phil Goss 17; Rebs: Trevor Mbakwe 20; Asts: Phil Goss 3	Pts: Pietro Aradori 22; Rebs: Marco Cusin 11; Asts: Jenkins, Ragland 3
Roma wins series 3–0

Palazzetto dello Sport, Rome
Referees: Luigi Lamonica, Alessandro Vicino, Dino Seghetti

== Semifinals ==
=== EA7 Emporio Armani Milano vs. Banco di Sardegna Sassari ===
30 May
20:30

Boxscore

EA7 Emporio Armani Milano 95, Banco di Sardegna Sassari 84
Scoring by quarter: 20–24, 30–27, 22–22, 23–11
Pts: Gentile, Samuels 23; Rebs: Daniel Hackett 9 Asts: Daniel Hackett 8	Pts: Drake Diener 19; Rebs: Omar Thomas 8 Asts: Travis Diener 8

Mediolanum Forum, Milan
Referees: Guerrino Cerebuch, Gianluca Sardella, Fabrizio Paglialunga

1 June
20:30

Boxscore

EA7 Emporio Armani Milano 83, Banco di Sardegna Sassari 90
Scoring by quarter: 20–14, 20–17, 20–35, 23–24
Pts: Alessandro Gentile 21; Rebs: Gani Lawal 7 Asts: Gentile, Hackett 4	Pts: Diener, Green 20; Rebs: Caleb Green 8 Asts: Marques Green 11

Mediolanum Forum, Milan
Referees: Saverio Lanzarini, Alessandro Martolini, Dino Seghetti

3 June
20:30

Boxscore

Banco di Sardegna Sassari 76, EA7 Emporio Armani Milano 83 (OT)
Scoring by quarter: 15–24, 17–17, 16–19, 21–9, Overtime: 7–14
Pts: Caleb Green 18; Rebs: Drew Gordon 7 Asts: Travis Diener 7	Pts: Alessandro Gentile 25; Rebs: Alessandro Gentile 9 Asts: Daniel Hackett 8

Palasport Roberta Serradimigni, Sassari
Referees: Roberto Begnis, Gianluca Mattioli, Mark Bartoli

5 June
20:30

Boxscore

Banco di Sardegna Sassari 56, EA7 Emporio Armani Milano 63
Scoring by quarter: 20–21, 8–15, 14–12, 14–15
Pts: Benjamin Eze 12; Rebs: Benjamin Eze 10; Asts: Drake Diener 3	Pts: Keith Langford 17; Rebs: Samardo Samuels 13; Asts: Alessandro Gentile 3

Palasport Roberta Serradimigni, Sassari
Referees: Guerrino Cerebuch, Gianluca Sardella, Massimiliano Filippini

7 June
20:30

Boxscore

EA7 Emporio Armani Milano 73, Banco di Sardegna Sassari 76
Scoring by quarter: 11–15, 20–19, 21–14, 21–28
Pts: Keith Langford 16; Rebs: Samardo Samuels 6 Asts: Alessandro Gentile 6	Pts: Drake Diener 16; Rebs: Drew Gordon 7 Asts: D. Diener, M. Green 4

Mediolanum Forum, Milan
Referees: Luigi Lamonica, Enrico Sabetta, Lorenzo Baldini

9 June
20:30

Boxscore

Banco di Sardegna Sassari 76, EA7 Emporio Armani Milano 95
Scoring by quarter: 16–24, 17–30, 20–18, 23–23
Pts: Drake Diener 19; Rebs: Drew Gordon 6 Asts: Marques Green 5	Pts: Keith Langford 24; Rebs: Gani Lawal 8 Asts: Langford, Melli 3
Milano wins series 4–2

Palasport Roberta Serradimigni, Sassari
Referees: Roberto Begnis, Roberto Chiari, Emanuele Aronne

=== Montepaschi Siena vs. Acea Roma ===
31 May
20:30

Boxscore

Montepaschi Siena 75, Acea Roma 73
Scoring by quarter: 21–20, 18–16, 23–19, 13–18
Pts: Marquez Haynes 26; Rebs: Othello Hunter 9 Asts: Marquez Haynes 6	Pts: Bobby Jones 18; Rebs: Trevor Mbakwe 11; Asts: Goss, Hosley 4

Palasport Mens Sana, Siena
Referees: Luigi Lamonica, Alessandro Vicino, Gianluca Calbucci

2 May
20:30

Boxscore

Montepaschi Siena 91, Acea Roma 67
Scoring by quarter: 21–17, 25–16, 23–15, 22–19
Pts: Erick Green 17; Rebs: Hunter, Ress 6 Asts: Marquez Haynes 5	Pts: Mayo, Mbakwe 15; Rebs: Trevor Mbakwe 10; Asts: Goss, Josh Mayo 5

Palasport Mens Sana, Siena
Referees: Paolo Taurino, Gabriele Bettini, Maurizio Biggi

4 June
20:30

Boxscore

Acea Roma 69, Montepaschi Siena 78
Scoring by quarter: 14–16, 13–12, 14–29, 28–21
Pts: Trevor Mbakwe 19; Rebs: Trevor Mbakwe 18; Asts: Goss, Hosley 4	Pts: Erick Green 15; Rebs: Othello Hunter 9 Asts: Marquez Haynes 6

PalaLottomatica, Rome
Referees: Carmelo Paternico, Manuel Mazzoni, Denny Borgioni

6 June
20:30

Boxscore

Acea Roma 71, Montepaschi Siena 65
Scoring by quarter: 20–16, 14–18, 17–13, 20–18
Pts: Jimmy Baron 24; Rebs: Trevor Mbakwe 9 Asts: Halil Kanacevic 4	Pts: Josh Carter 23; Rebs: Othello Hunter 10; Asts: Marquez Haynes 6

PalaLottomatica, Rome
Referees: Saverio Lanzarini, Alessandro Vicino, Luca Weidmann

8 June
20:30

Boxscore

Montepaschi Siena 91, Acea Roma 75
Scoring by quarter: 22–17, 22–23, 23–16, 24–19
Pts: Marquez Haynes 29; Rebs: Spencer Nelson 7 Asts: Matt Janning 5	Pts: Phil Goss 23; Rebs: Trevor Mbakwe 11; Asts: Phil Goss 6
Siena wins series 4–1

Palasport Mens Sana, Siena
Referees: Paolo Taurino, Tolga Sahin, Alessandro Terreni

== Finals ==
=== EA7 Emporio Armani Milano vs. Montepaschi Siena ===
15 June
18:45

Boxscore

EA7 Emporio Armani Milano 74, Montepaschi Siena 61
Scoring by quarter: 22–15, 22–13, 16–16, 14–17
Pts: Curtis Jerrells 26; Rebs: three players 5 Asts: three players 3	Pts: Othello Hunter 19; Rebs: Othello Hunter 10; Asts: Haynes, Janning 3

Mediolanum Forum, Milan
Referees: Guerrino Cerebuch, Enrico Sabetta, Alessandro Terreni

17 June
20:30

Boxscore

EA7 Emporio Armani Milano 79, Montepaschi Siena 65
Scoring by quarter: 19–16, 23–19, 21–15, 16–15
Pts: Samardo Samuels 20; Rebs: Samardo Samuels 15; Asts: Keith Langford 4	Pts: Marquez Haynes 12; Rebs: Spencer Nelson 8 Asts: Marquez Haynes 2

Mediolanum Forum, Milan
Referees: Luigi Lamonica, Gianluca Mattioli, Manuel Mazzoni

19 June
20:30

Boxscore

Montepaschi Siena 85, EA7 Emporio Armani Milano 68
Scoring by quarter: 19–13, 27–14, 18–32, 21–9
Pts: Othello Hunter 25; Rebs: Othello Hunter 10; Asts: Marquez Haynes 4	Pts: Daniel Hackett 14; Rebs: Lawal, Samuels 6 Asts: Keith Langford 2

Palasport Mens Sana, Siena
Referees: Carmelo Paternico, Alessandro Vicino, Lorenzo Baldini

21 June
20:30

Boxscore

Montepaschi Siena 75, EA7 Emporio Armani Milano 68
Scoring by quarter: 19–11, 17–22, 24–19, 15–16
Pts: Matt Janning 20; Rebs: Hunter, Janning 6 Asts: three players 1	Pts: Keith Langford 20; Rebs: Samardo Samuels 8 Asts: Keith Langford 4

Palasport Mens Sana, Siena
Referees: Saverio Lanzarini, Roberto Chiari, Maurizio Biggi

23 June
20:30

Boxscore

EA7 Emporio Armani Milano 68, Montepaschi Siena 72
Scoring by quarter: 15–20, 18–14, 16–18, 19–20
Pts: Keith Langford 14; Rebs: eight players 4 Asts: Langford, Samuels 2	Pts: Othello Hunter 18; Rebs: Othello Hunter 7 Asts: Haynes, Janning 4

Mediolanum Forum, Milan
Referees: Roberto Begnis, Tolga Sahin, Dino Seghetti

25 June
20:30

Boxscore

Montepaschi Siena 72, EA7 Emporio Armani Milano 74
Scoring by quarter: 20–21, 16–19, 19–23, 17–11
Pts: Marquez Haynes 22; Rebs: Othello Hunter 8 Asts: Spencer Nelson 5	Pts: Alessandro Gentile 23; Rebs: Gani Lawal 9 Asts: Curtis Jerrells 4

Palasport Mens Sana, Siena
Referees: Paolo Taurino, Alessandro Martolini, Gabriele Bettini

27 June
20:30

Boxscore

EA7 Emporio Armani Milano 74, Montepaschi Siena 67
Scoring by quarter: 19–9, 17–20, 12–25, 26–13
Pts: Alessandro Gentile 18; Rebs: Nicolò Melli 13; Asts: Hackett, Moss 3	Pts: Erick Green 15; Rebs: Othello Hunter 10; Asts: Marquez Haynes 4
Milano wins series 4–3

Mediolanum Forum, Milan
Referees: Saverio Lanzarini, Carmelo Paternico, Luigi Lamonica

== Awards ==
- Most Valuable Player:

(United States) Drake Diener (Dinamo Sassari)

- Finals MVP:

(Italy) Alessandro Gentile (EA7 Emporio Armani Milano)
