= 2011–12 Eurocup Basketball =

- Season: 2011–12
- Dates: September 27, 2011 – April 15, 2012

Regular season
- Season MVP: Patrick Beverley

Finals
- Champions: (Russia) Khimki (1st title)
- Runners-up: (Spain) Valencia
- Third place: (Lithuania) Lietuvos rytas
- Fourth place: (Russia) Spartak Saint Petersburg
- Finals MVP: Zoran Planinić

The 2011–12 Eurocup Basketball season was the tenth edition of Europe's second-tier level transnational competition for men's professional basketball clubs, the EuroCup. The EuroCup is the European-wide league level that is one level below the EuroLeague. It ran from September 27, 2011, until April 15, 2012. The winner of this competition earned a place at the group stage of the next season's EuroLeague.

== Teams allocation ==
=== Distribution ===
32 teams participated in the Eurocup Regular Season:

- A total of 10 teams from nine countries qualified directly to the 32-team regular season through their results in domestic competitions, or through a wild card.
- Another 8 teams earned their place at the group stage by winning a qualifying round. On July 7, a draw for the Eurocup Qualifying Round, which featured 16 teams from 13 countries, was held in Barcelona. The 8 winners from those two-game, head-to-head qualifying games advanced to the Eurocup Regular Season.
- The remaining 14 teams were filled with the losers of the Euroleague qualifying rounds that was played from 29 September - 2 October.

=== Teams ===
The labels in the parentheses show how each team qualified for the place of its starting round (TH: EuroCup title holders; FEC: FBIA EuroChallenge title holders):

- 1st, 2nd, 3rd, 4th, 5th, etc.: League position after eventual Playoffs
- RW: Regular season winners
- CW: Cup winners
- EL: EuroLeague
  - EL QR: EuroLeague qualifying round losers

Regular season
(France) Cholet (EL QR)	(Russia) Khimki (EL QR)	(Croatia) Cibona (EL QR)	(Poland) PGE Turów (EL QR)
(France) Gravelines (EL QR)	(Russia) Lokomotiv Kuban (4th)	(Ukraine) Donetsk (EL QR)	(Spain) Valencia (5th)
(France) ASVEL (EL QR)	(Greece) PAOK (EL QR)	(Czech Republic) ČEZ Nymburk (EL QR)	(Israel) Hapoel Jerusalem (3rd)
(Germany) Alba Berlin (EL QR)	(Greece) Aris (4th)	(Latvia) VEF Rīga (EL QR)	(Italy) Benetton Bwin (4th)
(Germany) Fraport Skyliners (3rd)	(Lithuania) Lietuvos rytas (EL QR)	(Montenegro) Budućnost VOLI (EL QR)	(Netherlands) GasTerra Flames (1st)
(Germany) Bayern Munich (WC)	(Lithuania) Rūdupis (3rd)	(Turkey) Banvit (EL QR)	(Slovenia) Krka^{FEC} (1st)
Qualifying round
(France) Élan Chalon (5th)	(Turkey) Beşiktaş Milangaz (5th)	(Ukraine) Azovmash (5th)	(Croatia) Cedevita (2nd)
(France) Le Mans (8th)	(Turkey) Pınar Karşıyaka (6th)	(Spain) Gran Canaria 2014 (6th)	(Germany) Artland Dragons (4th)
(Belgium) Dexia Mons-Hainaut (3rd)	(Russia) Spartak Saint Petersburg (7th)	(Sweden) Norrköping Dolphins (2nd)	(Cyprus) ETHA Engomis (1st)
(Belgium) Telenet Oostende (4th)	(Latvia) Ventspils (2nd)	(Czech Republic) Prostějov (2nd)	(Bulgaria) Lukoil Academic (1st)

== Qualifying round ==
The eight winners of the qualifying round joined the regular season. The eight losers transferred to the EuroChallenge regular season.

Team 1	Agg.	Team 2	1st leg	2nd leg
Azovmash (Ukraine)	153–140	(Latvia) Ventspils	74–75	79–65
Gran Canaria 2014 (Spain)	153–121	(Germany) Artland Dragons	61–56	92–65
Dexia Mons-Hainaut (Belgium)	144–141	(Turkey) Beşiktaş Milangaz	70–78	74–63
Cedevita (Croatia)	157–147	(France) Élan Chalon	73–78	84–69
Le Mans Sarthe (France)	160–151	(Turkey) Pınar Karşıyaka	80–73	80–78
Telenet Oostende (Belgium)	158–129	(Sweden) Norrköping Dolphins	88–62	70–67
Spartak Saint Petersburg (Russia)	143–123	(Cyprus) ETHA Engomis	60–59	83–64
Prostějov (Czech Republic)	142–157	(Bulgaria) Lukoil Academic	65–70	77–87

== Regular season ==
The Regular Season ran from November 15, 2011, to December 20, 2011.

If teams were level on record at the end of the Regular Season, tiebreakers were applied in the following order:

1. Head-to-head record.
2. Head-to-head point differential.
3. Point differential during the Regular Season.
4. Points scored during the regular season.
5. Sum of quotients of points scored and points allowed in each Regular Season match.

Key to colors
Top two places in each group advance to Last 16

=== Group A ===
	Team	Pld	W	L	PF	PA	Diff
1.	(France) Gravelines	6	5	1	517	430	+87
2.	(Ukraine) Donetsk	6	5	1	463	443	+20
3.	(Israel) Hapoel Jerusalem	6	2	4	463	493	−30
4.	(Croatia) Cibona	6	0	6	456	533	−77

=== Group B ===
	Team	Pld	W	L	PF	PA	Diff
1.	(Russia) Khimki	6	6	0	480	398	+82
2.	(Latvia) VEF Rīga	6	3	3	436	444	−8
3.	(France) Cholet Basket	6	2	4	389	428	−39
4.	(Greece) P.A.O.K.	6	1	5	417	452	−35

=== Group C ===
	Team	Pld	W	L	PF	PA	Diff
1.	(Czech Republic) Nymburk	6	5	1	498	424	+74
2.	(Greece) Aris	6	4	2	431	397	+34
3.	(Lithuania) Rūdupis	6	3	3	487	485	+2
4.	(Netherlands) GasTerra Flames	6	0	6	391	501	−110

=== Group D ===
	Team	Pld	W	L	PF	PA	Diff
1.	(France) ASVEL	6	4	2	459	426	+33
2.	(Spain) Valencia Basket	6	4	2	487	447	+40
3.	(Belgium) Telenet Oostende	6	2	4	415	454	−39
4.	(Bulgaria) Lukoil Academic	6	2	4	400	434	−34

=== Group E ===
	Team	Pld	W	L	PF	PA	Diff
1.	(Turkey) Banvit	6	4	2	421	397	+24
2.	(Russia) Lokomotiv-Kuban	6	4	2	431	399	+32
3.	(Spain) Gran Canaria	6	4	2	416	405	+11
4.	(Germany) Skyliners Frankfurt	6	0	6	362	429	−67

=== Group F ===
	Team	Pld	W	L	PF	PA	Diff
1.	(Lithuania) Lietuvos rytas	6	6	0	478	370	+108
2.	(Slovenia) Krka	6	4	2	434	421	+13
3.	(Ukraine) Azovmash	6	1	5	404	453	−49
4.	(France) Le Mans	6	1	5	392	464	−72

=== Group G ===
	Team	Pld	W	L	PF	PA	Diff
1.	(Russia) Spartak Saint Petersburg	6	6	0	477	401	+76
2.	(Italy) Benetton Treviso	6	3	3	478	476	+2
3.	(Germany) Bayern Munich	6	2	4	404	436	−32
4.	(Croatia) Cedevita	6	1	5	413	459	−46

=== Group H ===
	Team	Pld	W	L	PF	PA	Diff
1.	(Germany) Alba Berlin	6	5	1	485	421	+64
2.	(Montenegro) Budućnost	6	3	3	416	425	−9
3.	(Belgium) Dexia Mons-Hainaut	6	2	4	445	463	−18
4.	(Poland) Turów Zgorzelec	6	2	4	446	483	−37

== Last 16 ==
=== Group I ===
	Team	Pld	W	L	PF	PA	Diff	Tie-break
1.	(Spain) Valencia Basket	6	6	0	463	387	+76	
2.	(Czech Republic) Nymburk	6	3	3	484	441	+43	1–1 (+6)
3.	(Latvia) VEF Rīga	6	3	3	432	456	–24	1–1 (–6)
4.	(France) Gravelines	6	0	6	370	465	–95	

=== Group J ===
	Team	Pld	W	L	PF	PA	Diff	Tie-break
1.	(Ukraine) Donetsk	6	5	1	477	437	+40	1–1 (+5)
2.	(Russia) Khimki	6	5	1	465	419	+46	1–1 (–5)
3.	(France) ASVEL	6	1	5	460	477	–17	1–1 (+10)
4.	(Greece) Aris	6	1	5	389	458	–69	1–1 (–10)

=== Group K ===
	Team	Pld	W	L	PF	PA	Diff	Tie-break
1.	(Russia) Spartak St. Petersburg	6	5	1	428	385	+43	
2.	(Montenegro) Budućnost	6	3	3	397	398	–1	1–1 (+3)
3.	(Turkey) Banvit	6	3	3	430	428	+2	1–1 (–3)
4.	(Slovenia) Krka	6	1	5	390	434	–44	

=== Group L ===
	Team	Pld	W	L	PF	PA	Diff	Tie-break
1.	(Russia) Lokomotiv-Kuban	6	4	2	466	452	+14	2–0 (+18)
2.	(Lithuania) Lietuvos rytas	6	4	2	468	443	+25	0–2 (–18)
3.	(Italy) Benetton Treviso	6	3	3	447	451	–4	
4.	(Germany) Alba Berlin	6	1	5	433	468	–35	

== Quarterfinals ==
The quarterfinals were two-legged ties determined on aggregate score. The first legs were played on March 20. The return legs were played on March 27. The group winners in each tie, listed as Team 1, hosted the second leg.

Team 1	Agg.	Team 2	1st leg	2nd leg
Valencia (Spain)	156–138	(Montenegro) Budućnost VOLI	71–75	85–63
Donetsk (Ukraine)	145–154	(Lithuania) Lietuvos rytas	65–76	80–78
Spartak St. Petersburg (Russia)	154–135	(Czech Republic) ČEZ Nymburk	68–64	86–71
Lokomotiv Kuban (Russia)	153–158	(Russia) Khimki	72–81	81–77

== Final four ==
Euroleague Basketball Company announced that the 2011–12 Eurocup season would culminate with the Eurocup Finals in Khimki, Russia, on April 14 and 15.

Semifinals
14 April
(Spain) Valencia	80
(Lithuania) Lietuvos rytas	70
14 April
(Russia) Spartak St. Petersburg	73
(Russia) Khimki	77

Final
15 April
(Spain) Valencia	68
(Russia) Khimki	77
Third place game
15 April
(Lithuania) Lietuvos rytas	71
(Russia) Spartak St. Petersburg	62

== Individual statistics ==
=== Rating ===
Rank	Name	Team	Games	Rating	PIR
1.	(North Macedonia) Jeremiah Massey	(Russia) PBC Lokomotiv-Kuban	14	278	19.86
2.	(United States) Patrick Beverley	(Russia) Spartak Saint Petersburg	16	275	17.19
3.	(Azerbaijan) Nik Caner-Medley	(Spain) Valencia	13	219	16.85
4.	(United States) DaShaun Wood	(Germany) Alba Berlin	12	202	16.83
5.	(France) Ali Traore	(Russia) PBC Lokomotiv-Kuban	13	218	16.77

=== Points ===
Rank	Name	Team	Games	Points	PPG
1.	(United States) Ramel Curry	(Ukraine) BC Donetsk	14	230	16.43
2.	(North Macedonia) Jeremiah Massey	(Russia) PBC Lokomotiv-Kuban	14	223	15.93
3.	(France) Ali Traore	(Russia) PBC Lokomotiv-Kuban	13	199	15.31
4.	(United States) Tre Simmons	(Czech Republic) ČEZ Nymburk	14	211	15.07
5.	(Lithuania) Renaldas Seibutis	(Lithuania) Lietuvos rytas	16	236	14.75

=== Rebounds ===
Rank	Name	Team	Games	Rebounds	RPG
1.	(North Macedonia) Jeremiah Massey	(Russia) PBC Lokomotiv-Kuban	14	117	8.36
2.	(Lithuania) Jonas Valančiūnas	(Lithuania) Lietuvos rytas	16	122	7.63
3.	(France) Ali Traore	(Russia) PBC Lokomotiv-Kuban	13	92	7.08
4.	(United States) Lawrence Roberts	(Lithuania) Lietuvos rytas	16	103	6.44
5.	(Azerbaijan) Nik Caner-Medley	(Spain) Valencia	13	83	6.38

=== Assists ===
Rank	Name	Team	Games	Assists	APG
1.	(United States) DaShaun Wood	(Germany) Alba Berlin	12	65	5.42
2.	(Israel) Yotam Halperin	(Russia) Spartak Saint Petersburg	14	74	5.29
3.	(Croatia) Zoran Planinić	(Russia) BC Khimki	15	73	4.87
4.	(Montenegro) Tyrese Rice	(Lithuania) Lietuvos rytas	15	70	4.67
5.	(Turkey) Barış Ermiş	(Turkey) Banvit	10	45	4.50

== Awards ==
=== MVP Weekly ===
==== Regular season ====
Week	Player	Team	PIR
1	(France) Tony Parker	(France) ASVEL Basket	40
2	(United States) J. R. Giddens	(Greece) P.A.O.K.	32
3	(Azerbaijan) Nik Caner-Medley	(Spain) Valencia Basket	29
4	(Montenegro) Nikola Vučević	(Montenegro) Budućnost	36
5	(North Macedonia) Jeremiah Massey	(Russia) PBC Lokomotiv-Kuban	28
6	(France) Fabien Causeur	(France) Cholet Basket	33

==== Top 16 ====
Week	Player	Team	PIR
1	(United States) Patrick Beverley	(Russia) Spartak Saint Petersburg	27
2	(Greece) Loukas Mavrokefalidis	(Russia) Spartak Saint Petersburg	29
3	(France) Nando de Colo	(Spain) Valencia Basket	40
4	(United States) Hilton Armstrong	(France) ASVEL Basket	26
5	(United States) DaShaun Wood	(Germany) Alba Berlin	37
6	(North Macedonia) Jeremiah Massey	(Russia) PBC Lokomotiv-Kuban	37

==== Quarterfinals ====
Game	Player	Team	PIR
1	(Montenegro) Bojan Dubljević	(Montenegro) Budućnost	25
2	(Israel) Yotam Halperin	(Russia) Spartak St. Petersburg	31

=== Eurocup MVP ===
- (United States) Patrick Beverley (Spartak St. Petersburg)

=== Eurocup Finals MVP ===
- (Croatia) Zoran Planinić (Khimki)

=== All-Eurocup Team ===
Position	All-Eurocup First Team	Club team	All-Eurocup Second Team	Club team
PG	(United States) Patrick Beverley	(Russia) Spartak St. Petersburg	(Israel) Yotam Halperin	(Russia) Spartak St. Petersburg
SG/SF	(Croatia) Zoran Planinić	(Russia) Khimki	(United States) Ramel Curry	(Ukraine) Donetsk
SG/SF	(Lithuania) Renaldas Seibutis	(Lithuania) Lietuvos Rytas	(Czech Republic) Pavel Pumprla	(Czech Republic) ČEZ Nymburk
PF/C	(Azerbaijan) Nik Caner-Medley	(Spain) Valencia	(North Macedonia) Jeremiah Massey	(Russia) Lokomotiv Kuban
PF/C	(Lithuania) Jonas Valančiūnas	(Lithuania) Lietuvos Rytas	(Montenegro) Bojan Dubljević	(Montenegro) Budućnost

=== Coach of the Year ===
- (Slovenia) Jure Zdovc (Spartak St. Petersburg)

=== Rising Star ===
- (Lithuania) Jonas Valančiūnas (Lietuvos Rytas)

== See also ==
- 2011–12 Euroleague Basketball
- 2011–12 EuroChallenge
