= 2011–12 Euroleague qualifying rounds =

Euroleague qualifying rounds

This page describes the qualifying rounds for the 2011–12 Turkish Airlines Euroleague.

The Qualifying Rounds consisted of two Final-Eight tournaments, held in Vilnius and Charleroi. The two winning teams advanced to the Euroleague Regular Season

== Teams ==
Country (League)	Teams	Teams (ranking in 2010–11 national championship)		
France (LNB Pro A)	3	Cholet (2)	Gravelines (3)	ASVEL^{WC} (4)
Turkey (TBL)	2	Galatasaray (2)	Banvit (3)	
Belgium (BLB)	1	Spirou Charleroi (1)		
Croatia (A1 Liga)	1	Cibona^{WC} (4)		
Czech Republic (NBL)	1	ČEZ Nymburk (1)		
(Germany) (BBL)	1	Alba Berlin^{WC} (2)		
Greece (ESAKE A1)	1	PAOK (3)		
Latvia (LBL)	1	VEF Rīga (1)		
Lithuania (LKL)	1	Lietuvos rytas (2)		
Montenegro (Opportunity Liga)	1	Budućnost (1)		
Poland (PLK)	1	PGE Turów^{WC} (2)		
Russia (PBL)	1	Khimki (2)		
Ukraine (SuperLeague)	1	Donetsk^{WC} (2)		

== Draw ==
The draw was made on Wednesday, July 6, 2011, at Barcelona, Spain. The draw determined the qualifying-round matchups and regular-season groups for the Euroleague, as well as the qualifying rounds for the Eurocup and the regular-season for the EuroChallenge.

=== Bracket ===
==== Bracket A ====
Games in Bracket A were played at the Siemens Arena in Vilnius, Lithuania.

First qualifying round 29–30 September
(France) ASVEL	80
(France) Gravelines	72
(Greece) PAOK	64
(Turkey) Galatasaray	77
(Lithuania) Lietuvos rytas	83
(Montenegro) Budućnost	64
(Croatia) Cibona	77
(France) Cholet	70

Second qualifying round 1 October
(France) ASVEL	83
(Turkey) Galatasaray	93
(Lithuania) Lietuvos rytas	88
(Croatia) Cibona	71

Third qualifying round 2 October
(Turkey) Galatasaray	71
(Lithuania) Lietuvos rytas	63

==== Bracket B ====
Games in Bracket B were played at the Spiroudome in Charleroi, Belgium.

First qualifying round 29–30 September
(Germany) Alba Berlin	82
(Latvia) VEF Rīga	60
(Belgium) Belgacom Spirou	61
(Ukraine) Donetsk	59
(Russia) Khimki	74
(Poland) PGE Turów	67
(Czech Republic) ČEZ Nymburk	69
(Turkey) Banvit	57

Second qualifying round 1 October
(Germany) Alba Berlin	63
(Belgium) Belgacom Spirou	74
(Russia) Khimki	79
(Czech Republic) ČEZ Nymburk	86

Third qualifying round 2 October
(Belgium) Belgacom Spirou	79
(Czech Republic) ČEZ Nymburk	53

== First qualifying round ==
=== Bracket A ===
September 29, 2011
17:00 CET

Report

Cibona (Croatia)	77–70	(France) Cholet
Scoring by quarter: 20–21, 19–19, 20–16, 18–14
Pts: Barbour 16; Rebs: Suton 7 Asts: Barbour 3		Pts: Battle 23; Rebs: Falker 6 Asts: Causeur 6

Siemens Arena, Vilnius
Attendance: 850
Referees: Jakub Zamojski (POL), Fernando Rocha (POR), Olegs Latisevs (LAT)

September 29, 2011
19:45 CET

Report

Lietuvos rytas (Lithuania)	83–64	(Montenegro) Budućnost
Scoring by quarter: 21–22, 19–10, 16–17, 27–15
Pts: Seibutis 17; Rebs: Valančiūnas 8 Asts: Rice 5		Pts: Vučević 18; Rebs: Vučević 6 Asts: Popović, Krstović 2

Siemens Arena, Vilnius
Attendance: 5,800
Referees: Carl Jungebrand (FIN), Borys Ryzhyk (UKR), Petri Mantyla (FIN)

September 30, 2011
17:00 CET

Report

PAOK (Greece)	64–77	(Turkey) Galatasaray
Scoring by quarter: 18–15, 14–19, 19–26, 13–17
Pts: Gorée 17; Rebs: Dikoudis 8 Asts: Wright 3		Pts: Gordon 21; Rebs: Aldemir 9 Asts: Açık 7

Siemens Arena, Vilnius
Attendance: 1,000
Referees: Carl Jungebrand (FIN), Fernando Rocha (POR), Moritz Reiter (GER)

September 30, 2011
19:45 CET

Report

ASVEL (France)	80–72	(France) Gravelines
Scoring by quarter: 19–14, 14–19, 27–19, 20–20
Pts: Goss 25; Rebs: Jackson 8 Asts: Goss 5		Pts: Three players 13; Rebs: Edwards 11; Asts: Three players 2

Siemens Arena, Vilnius
Attendance: 450
Referees: Borys Ryzhyk (UKR), Olegs Latisevs (LAT), Seffi Shemmesh (ISR)

=== Bracket B ===
September 29, 2011
18:00 CET

Report

Alba Berlin (Germany)	82–60	(Latvia) VEF Rīga
Scoring by quarter: 25–20, 19–12, 21–13, 17–15
Pts: Staiger 15; Rebs: Simonović 9 Asts: Weaver 6		Pts: Janičenoks 12; Rebs: Cain 8 Asts: Janičenoks 3

Spiroudome, Charleroi
Attendance: 3,000
Referees: Luigi Lamonica (ITA), Sinisa Herceg (CRO), Zdravko Rutesic (MNE)

September 29, 2011
20:45 CET

Report

Belgacom Spirou (Belgium)	61–59	(Ukraine) Donetsk
Scoring by quarter: 10–14, 11–14, 19–15, 21–16
Pts: Welsch 13; Rebs: Green 11; Asts: Mallet 5		Pts: Lee 13; Rebs: Radenović 8 Asts: Curry 3

Spiroudome, Charleroi
Attendance: 3,000
Referees: Sasa Pukl (SLO), Milivoje Jovcic (SRB), Tomas Jasevicius (LTU)

September 30, 2011
18:00 CET

Report

Khimki (Russia)	74–67	(Poland) PGE Turów
Scoring by quarter: 15–13, 16–16, 27–16, 16–22
Pts: Lončar 16; Rebs: Five players 5 Asts: Kelati 3		Pts: Jackson 20; Rebs: Wysocki 6 Asts: Moore 6

Spiroudome, Charleroi
Attendance: 850
Referees: Sinisa Herceg (CRO), Milivoje Jovcic (SRB), Ioannis Foufis (GRE)

September 30, 2011
20:45 CET

Report

ČEZ Nymburk (Czech Republic)	69–57	(Turkey) Banvit
Scoring by quarter: 19–12, 15–9, 19–19, 16–17
Pts: Simmons, Wilson 19; Rebs: Wilson 11; Asts: Lawrence 4		Pts: Davis 15; Rebs: Bajramović 6 Asts: Erdoğan, Ermiş 2

Spiroudome, Charleroi
Attendance: 1,000
Referees: Sasa Pukl (SLO), Tomas Jasevicius (LTU), Aleksandar Milojevik (MKD)

== Second qualifying round ==
=== Bracket A ===
October 1, 2011
16:00 CET

Report

Lietuvos rytas (Lithuania)	88–71	(Croatia) Cibona
Scoring by quarter: 24–17, 17–24, 28–17, 19–13
Pts: Rice 19; Rebs: Roberts 9 Asts: Rice 7		Pts: Harper 14; Rebs: Suton, Harper 4 Asts: Five players 1

Siemens Arena, Vilnius
Attendance: 5,600
Referees: Borys Ryzhyk (UKR), Olegs Latisevs (LAT), Moritz Reiter (GER)

October 1, 2011
19:00 CET

Report

Galatasaray (Turkey)	93–83	(France) ASVEL
Scoring by quarter: 28-23, 24-28, 17-15, 24-17
Pts: Lakovič 22; Rebs: Shipp 8 Asts: Açık 6		Pts: Westermann 18; Rebs: Armstrong 11; Asts: Lacombe 3

Siemens Arena, Vilnius
Attendance: 450
Referees: Fernando Rocha (POR), Jakub Zamojski (POL), Petri Mantyla (FIN)

=== Bracket B ===
October 1, 2011
17:00 CET

Report

Belgacom Spirou (Belgium)	74–63	(Germany) Alba Berlin
Scoring by quarter: 24–16, 12–16, 17–14, 21–17
Pts: Broyles 15; Rebs: Riddick 7 Asts: Mallet 7		Pts: Allen 20; Rebs: Taylor 8 Asts: Schaffartzik 5

Spiroudome, Charleroi
Attendance: 3,000
Referees: Sasa Pukl (SLO), Sinisa Herceg (CRO), Ioannis Foufis (GRE)

October 1, 2011
20:00 CET

Report

ČEZ Nymburk (Czech Republic)	86–79	(Russia) Khimki
Scoring by quarter: 21-5, 28-17, 9-28, 28-29
Pts: Simmons 26; Rebs: Simmons 6 Asts: Lawrence 4		Pts: Lončar, Quinn 25; Rebs: Lončar 12; Asts: Kelati 5

Spiroudome, Charleroi
Attendance: 1,000
Referees: Luigi Lamonica (ITA), Tomas Jasevičius (LTU), Zdravko Rutesic (MNE)

== Third qualifying round ==
=== Bracket A ===
October 2, 2011
18:00 CET

Report

Lietuvos rytas (Lithuania)	63–71	(Turkey) Galatasaray
Scoring by quarter: 21-13, 7-17, 12-22, 23-19
Pts: Seibutis 15; Rebs: Roberts 9 Asts: Rice 4		Pts: Shumpert 14; Rebs: Shipp, Aldemir 6 Asts: Lakovič 5

Siemens Arena, Vilnius
Attendance: 8,400
Referees: Carl Jungebrand (FIN), Borys Ryzhyk (UKR), Fernando Rocha (POR)

=== Bracket B ===
October 2, 2011
19:00 CET

Report

Belgacom Spirou (Belgium)	79–53	(Czech Republic) ČEZ Nymburk
Scoring by quarter: 15-13, 19-8, 20-15, 25-17
Pts: Hill 21; Rebs: Hill 12; Asts: Welsch 7		Pts: Lawrence 10; Rebs: Nečas 11; Asts: Lawrence 3

Spiroudome, Charleroi
Attendance: 4,000
Referees: Sasa Pukl (SLO), Milivoje Jovcic (SRB), Sinisa Herceg (CRO)
