= Phil Goss =

American basketball player (born 1983)

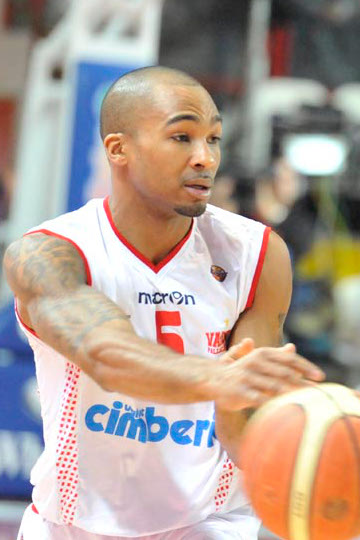
- Goss with Varese in 2010

Personal information
- Born: April 7, 1983 (age 43) Temple Hills, Maryland
- Listed height: 6 ft 2 in (1.88 m)
- Listed weight: 187 lb (85 kg)

Career information
- High school: Oxon Hill (Oxon Hill, Maryland)
- College: Drexel (2001–2005)
- NBA draft: 2005: undrafted
- Playing career: 2005–2019
- Position: Point guard / shooting guard
- Coaching career: 2019–present

Career history

Playing
- 2005–2006: Polynorm Giants
- 2006–2007: Beykozspor
- 2007–2008: Eldan Ashkelon
- 2008: Koszalin
- 2008–2009: Rimini Crabs
- 2009–2010: Scafati
- 2010–2011: Varese
- 2011–2012: ASVEL
- 2012: Varese
- 2012–2014: Virtus Roma
- 2014–2016: Reyer Venezia
- 2016–2017: Brindisi
- 2017–2019: PAOK Thessaloniki

Coaching
- 2019–2020: Capital City Go-Go (assistant)

Career highlights
- Greek All Star Game 3-Point Shootout champion (2019); Greek League All Star (2019); Kees Akerboom Trophy (2006); Second-team All-CAA (2005); First-team All-CAA (2004); CAA All-Rookie team (2002)

Philip Alexander Goss (born April 7, 1983) is an American former basketball player. At a height of 6 ft 2 in (1.88 m) tall, he was able to play at both the point guard and shooting guard positions.

== High school career ==
Goss played for his local Oxon Hill High School, with which he won the Class 4A Maryland State Championship in 2000. He was named All-Met Second Team by The Washington Post, in 2001.

== College career ==
Goss committed to play college basketball at Drexel University, of the Colonial Athletic Association (CAA), and the NCAA Division I, prior to the signing of head coach Bruiser Flint, in April 2001. He started 27 of 28 games he played as a freshman, and averaged 11.4 points, 2.9 assists and 1.7 steals per game, in nearly 30 minutes played per game. He was named to the 2002 CAA All-Rookie team.

In the 2002–03 season, he made a school record 90 three-pointers - later beaten by teammate Dominick Mejia - combined with an 11.5 scoring average, helped Drexel reach the 2003 CAA tournament final, that they would lose 62–70 to UNC Wilmington. They again lost to UNCW in 2003–04, this time in the quarterfinals. Goss' 13.6 points, 2.4 assists and 2.1 steals, in around 32 minutes per game, earned him a place in the 2004 All-CAA First-team.

Goss led the Dragons in scoring, with an average of 14.4 points per game, in 2004–05. However, his 18 points scored in the CAA Tournament quarterfinal, against Hofstra, could not stop Drexel from losing. Thus, a disappointed Goss never played in the NCAA tournament. He was selected to the All-CAA Second Team. Drexel's opening round loss in the 2005 National Invitation Tournament - which marked their third consecutive appearance in the NIT - was his last collegiate game. As of 2014–15, he was 12th on the Drexel all-time career scoring list (1,473 points), second for career 3-pt made field goals (306), and fourth for career steals (166).

== Professional career ==
After not being selected in the 2005 NBA draft, Goss moved to the Netherlands, signing with the Polynorm Giants of the Dutch Basketball League, which was the first offer he received. In the 2005–06 season, he averaged 9.4 points, 3.4 assists and 3.1 steals, in more than 35 minutes per game. He also played in the league's All-Star Game.

The next season, he signed with Beykozspor, of the more competitive Turkish Basketball Super League. Playing for the lower table team, he managed to average 13.9 points, 4 assists (10th best in the league), and 4 rebounds per game, in the 2006–07 season.

Goss next moved to the Israeli Basketball Premier League, signing with Eldan Ashkelon. After breaking his nose in the first regular-season game, he found it hard to fit into the team, and disagreements with the club's management led to him leaving the team in February 2008. He finished the season in the Polish Basketball League, with AZS Koszalin. With the Polish club, played in 16 out of 18 games as a starter, and contributed 12 points per game, as the team made the league's playoffs.

In 2008, the American shooting guard moved to the Italian second division side Coopsette Rimini Crabs. Playing in what he described as, "the best league he'd played in", Goss flourished, becoming one of the league's best players. He finished the season with averages of 17.6 points, 3.4 rebounds, 2.9 assists, and 3.8 steals per game. He was the fourteenth best in the league in scoring, and first in steals during the regular season.

In August 2009, Goss moved to another Italian second division side, Bialetti Scafati. He had a good season there, contributing a league second-best 21.2 points per game (hitting 44.9% on three-point shots), adding 4.9 rebounds and 2.8 assists, in nearly 36 minutes per game, over the regular season. He posted slightly lower but still good figures in the league's playoffs, although Scafati lost at the quarterfinal stage.

Goss next moved up to the Italian first division LBA, signing with Cimberio Varese for the 2010–11 season. He finished his first Italian top division season with averages of 14.8 points, 3 rebounds and 3.8 assists per game, in 33 games.

The next summer, in August 2011, he moved to the French Pro A, joining ASVEL. Despite a good start, including scoring 25 points in the EuroLeague qualifier against Gravelines, Goss soon came into conflict with the club's head coach Pierre Vincent, who pulled him out of a game after 3 minutes, citing a lack of collective discipline. After averaging 9.1 points and 2.5 assists, in 23 minutes per game in the French league, with averages of 8.9 points and 2.3 assists in the same amount of playing time in the European second-tier level EuroCup, Goss parted ways with ASVEL in March 2012, and rejoined Varese.

After playing in the last 12 games of the Italian 2011–12 LBA season with Varese, in which he averaged 12.3 points, Goss joined the Italian club Acea Virtus Roma, in August 2012. He was an important part of Roma's "miracle" run to the Italian 2012–13 LBA finals, with 12.9 points in 31.4 minutes of playing time on average, including decisive performances in the semifinal series against Lenovo Cantù, including scoring 13 points in the last quarter of the game 6 do-or-die win. The American player was less decisive in the Italian League Finals against Montepaschi Siena, scoring 11 points, whilst also conceding a technical foul in Game 5, as Siena won the game to clinch the league's title.

Roma named Goss its team captain in July 2013, after he signed a new contract with the club for the 2013–14 season. He continued with his previous season's form, posting 14.8 points and 2.5 assists, in about 31 minutes per game, to help Roma reach the Italian LBA playoffs. Roma again found Siena in their way - this time in the league's semifinals - and were again outdone in five games, despite Goss' good performances, including 23 points in game 5 - his last game with Roma - in which he fouled out, after committing five fouls.

He joined another Italian LBA club, Umana Reyer Venezia, in June 2014. After averaging 14.1 points and 3.4 assists per game, in 41 games played during the 2014–15 LBA season, to help Venezia reach the Italian league's playoff semifinals, his contract was extended for another year, in July 2015.

== The Basketball Tournament (TBT) ==
In 2015, Goss averaged 8.3 points, 4.8 assists and 3.2 rebounds per game, over the course of six games played, in The Basketball Tournament on ESPN, for the City of Gods. The City of Gods advanced to the 2015 TBT Championship Game, where they fell 84–71 to Overseas Elite. Goss also played for the City of Gods in 2016 and 2017. In 2016, Goss averaged 9.4 points, 4.2 assists and 2.0 rebounds per game, to help the City of Gods advance to the semifinals, where they were defeated by eventual champions Overseas Elite. In the summer of 2017, in the City of Gods' first-round match up, Goss scored 10 points, in an 88–86 loss to Gael Nation, a team composed of Iona College basketball alum.

== Coaching career ==
On October 2, 2019, he was hired by the Capital City Go-Go to be an assistant coach.
