= 2011–12 Euroleague =

EuroLeague season

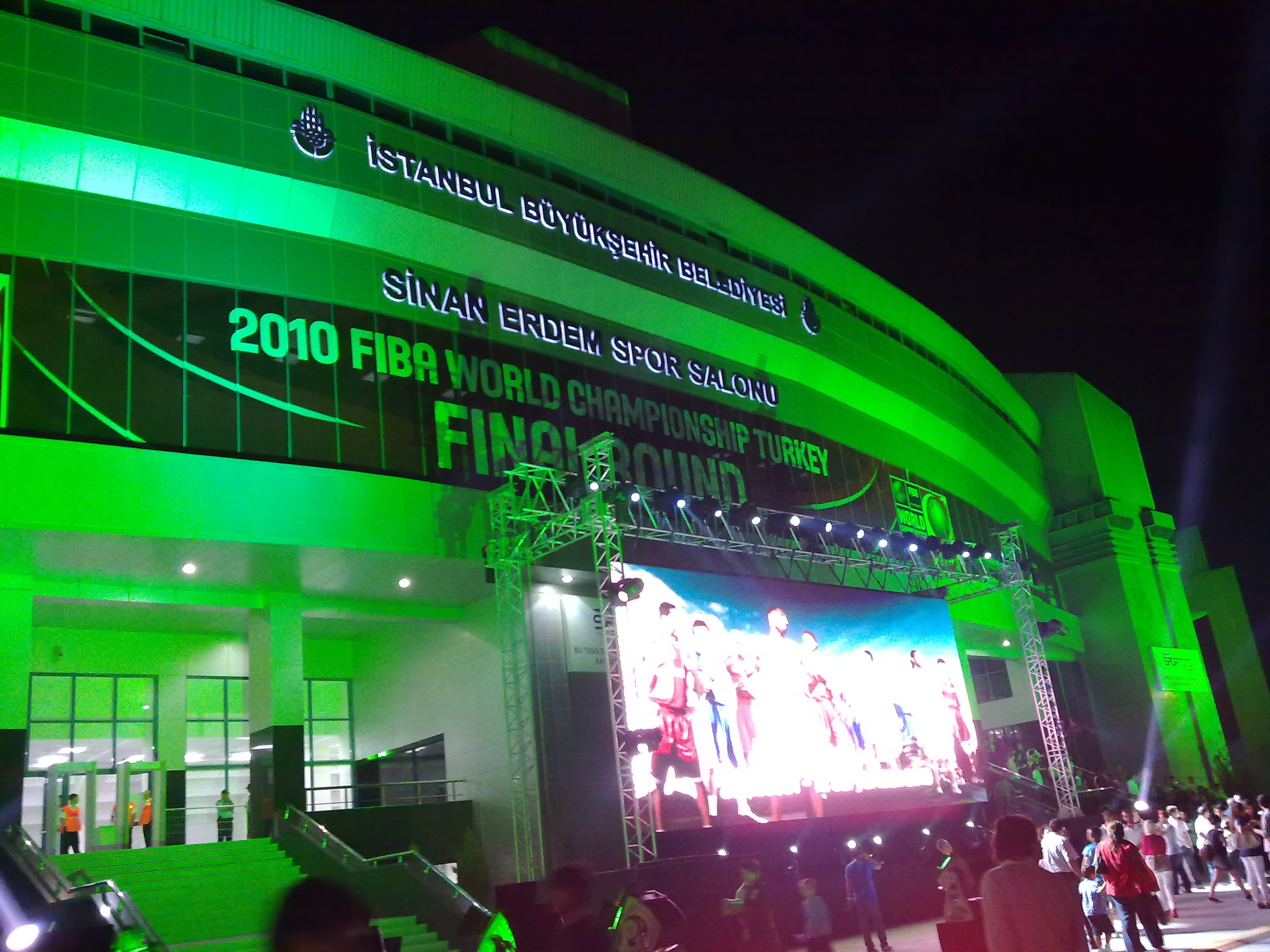
- The Sinan Erdem Dome in Istanbul hosted the Final Four
- Season: 2011–12
- Duration: 19 October 2011 – 13 May 2012
- Teams: 24

Regular season
- Season MVP: (Russia) Andrei Kirilenko

Finals
- Champions: (Greece) Olympiacos (2nd title)
- Runners-up: (Russia) CSKA Moscow
- Third place: (Spain) FC Barcelona Regal
- Fourth place: (Greece) Panathinaikos
- Final Four MVP: (Greece) Vassilis Spanoulis

Statistical leaders
Points	(North Macedonia) Bo McCalebb	16.9
Rebounds	(Russia) Andrei Kirilenko	7.5
Assists	(Montenegro) Omar Cook	5.7
Index Rating	(Russia) Andrei Kirilenko	24.2
- All statistics correct as of 7 September 2014.

The 2011–12 Turkish Airlines Euroleague was the 12th season of the modern era of Euroleague and the second under the title sponsorship of Turkish Airlines. Including the competition's previous incarnation as the FIBA Europe Champions Cup, this was the 55th season of the premier competition for European men's clubs. The Final Four was held at the Sinan Erdem Dome in Istanbul, in 11–13 May 2012. It was won by the Piraeus club Olympiacos (2nd title), who defeated CSKA Moscow in the championship game. It was the 5th final involving a Greek club in the last six seasons, and 4th Greek win in that time.

== Teams ==
On 20 June 2011 the teams for this season were announced.

The labels in the parentheses show how each team qualified for the place of its starting round (TH: EuroLeague title holders)

- A - licensed clubs: teams with 3-year licence
- Associated clubs: teams with B and C temporary licenses
- 1st, 2nd, etc.: League position after Playoffs
- EC: Champion of the 2010–11 Eurocup
- WC: Wild card

Regular season
A-license
(Spain) FC Barcelona Regal (1st)	(Greece) Panathinaikos (1st)	(Israel) Maccabi Electra (1st)	(Russia) CSKA Moscow (1st)
(Spain) Real Madrid (3rd)	(Greece) Olympiacos (2nd)	(Italy) Montepaschi Siena (1st)	(Slovenia) Union Olimpija (2nd)
(Spain) Caja Laboral (4th)	(Turkey) Fenerbahçe Ülker (1st)	(Lithuania) Žalgiris (1st)	
(Spain) Unicaja (8th)	(Turkey) Anadolu Efes (4th)	(Poland) Asseco Prokom Gdynia (1st)	
Associated clubs
(Spain) Gescrap Bizkaia Bilbao (2nd)	(Croatia) Zagreb (1st)	(Italy) Bennet Cantù (2nd)	(Russia) UNICS (EC)
(France) SLUC Nancy (1st)	(Serbia) Partizan (1st)	(Italy) EA7 Milano (WC)	(Germany) Brose Baskets (1st)
Qualifying rounds
(France) Cholet (2nd)	(Turkey) Galatasaray (2nd)	(Lithuania) Lietuvos rytas (2nd)	(Russia) Khimki (2nd)
(France) BCM Gravelines (3rd)	(Turkey) Banvit (3rd)	(Czech Republic) ČEZ Nymburk (1st)	(Germany) Alba Berlin (2nd)^{(WC)}
(France) ASVEL (4th)^{(WC)}	(Greece) PAOK (3rd)	(Montenegro) Budućnost (1st)	(Poland) PGE Turów (2nd)^{(WC)}
(Belgium) Belgacom Spirou (1st)	(Croatia) Cibona (4th)^{(WC)}	(Latvia) VEF Rīga (1st)	(Ukraine) Donetsk (2nd)^{(WC)}

1. Vacant A-licence (EA7): Euroleague Basketball suspended the A-license of Virtus Roma after Roma finished in 9th position in the 2010–11 Lega Basket Serie A, awarding a wild card entry to EA7 Milano instead.

== Draw ==
The draws for the 2011–12 Turkish Airlines Euroleague was held on Monday, 4 July. The draws determined the qualifying-round matchups and regular-season groups for the Euroleague, as well as the qualifying rounds for the Eurocup and the regular-season for the EuroChallenge.

Teams were seeded into six pots of four teams in accordance with the Club Ranking, based on their performance in European competitions during a three-year period.

Two teams from the same country cannot coincide in the same Regular Season group, except for Spain that has five teams participating in the competition.

Pot 1	Pot 2	Pot 3	Pot 4	Pot 5	Pot 6
(Spain) FC Barcelona (Greece) Olympiacos (Greece) Panathinaikos (Spain) Real Madrid	(Italy) Montepaschi Siena (Spain) Caja Laboral (Israel) Maccabi Electra (Russia) CSKA Moscow	(Serbia) Partizan (Russia) UNICS (Spain) Unicaja Málaga (Turkey) Fenerbahçe Ülker	(Lithuania) Žalgiris (Poland) Asseco Prokom (Spain) Gescrap Bizkaia (Turkey) Anadolu Efes	(Italy) EA7 Milano (Slovenia) Union Olimpija (Germany) Brose Bamberg (Italy) Bennet Cantù	(France) Nancy (Croatia) Zagreb (Turkey) Galatasaray (Belgium) Belgacom Spirou

== Qualifying rounds ==
A total number of sixteen teams participated in the qualifying rounds. The qualifying rounds consisted of two final eight knock-out tournaments. The two winning teams advance to the regular season.

==== Bracket A ====
Games in Bracket A were played at the Siemens Arena in Vilnius, Lithuania.

First qualifying round 29–30 September
(France) ASVEL	80
(France) Gravelines	72
(Greece) PAOK	64
(Turkey) Galatasaray	77
(Lithuania) Lietuvos rytas	83
(Montenegro) Budućnost	64
(Croatia) Cibona	77
(France) Cholet	70

Second qualifying round 1 October
(France) ASVEL	83
(Turkey) Galatasaray	93
(Lithuania) Lietuvos rytas	88
(Croatia) Cibona	71

Third qualifying round 2 October
(Turkey) Galatasaray	71
(Lithuania) Lietuvos rytas	63

==== Bracket B ====
Games in Bracket B were played at the Spiroudome in Charleroi, Belgium.

First qualifying round 29–30 September
(Germany) Alba Berlin	82
(Latvia) VEF Rīga	60
(Belgium) Belgacom Spirou	61
(Ukraine) Donetsk	59
(Russia) Khimki	74
(Poland) PGE Turów	67
(Czech Republic) ČEZ Nymburk	69
(Turkey) Banvit	57

Second qualifying round 1 October
(Germany) Alba Berlin	63
(Belgium) Belgacom Spirou	74
(Russia) Khimki	79
(Czech Republic) ČEZ Nymburk	86

Third qualifying round 2 October
(Belgium) Belgacom Spirou	79
(Czech Republic) ČEZ Nymburk	53

== Regular season ==
The regular season began on 19 October 2011. If teams were level on record at the end of the regular season, tiebreakers were applied in the following order:

1. Head-to-head record.
2. Head-to-head point differential.
3. Point differential during the Regular Season.
4. Points scored during the regular season.
5. Sum of quotients of points scored and points allowed in each Regular Season match.

=== Group A ===
Pos	Team	Pld	W	L	PF	PA	PD	Qualification
1	(Turkey) Fenerbahçe Ülker	10	6	4	785	758	+27	Advance to Top 16
2	(Greece) Olympiacos	10	6	4	782	757	+25	Advance to Top 16
3	(Italy) Bennet Cantù	10	5	5	724	744	−20	Advance to Top 16
4	(Spain) Gescrap Bizkaia Bilbao	10	5	5	776	755	+21	Advance to Top 16
5	(Spain) Caja Laboral	10	5	5	792	755	+37	
6	(France) SLUC Nancy	10	3	7	743	833	−90	

Source: Euroleague

=== Group B ===
Pos	Team	Pld	W	L	PF	PA	PD	Qualification
1	(Russia) CSKA Moscow	10	10	0	870	729	+141	Advance to Top 16
2	(Greece) Panathinaikos	10	7	3	834	739	+95	Advance to Top 16
3	(Spain) Unicaja	10	4	6	791	808	−17	Advance to Top 16
4	(Lithuania) Žalgiris	10	4	6	763	812	−49	Advance to Top 16
5	(Germany) Brose Baskets	10	3	7	773	794	−21	
6	(Croatia) Zagreb	10	2	8	718	867	−149	

Source: Euroleague

=== Group C ===
Pos	Team	Pld	W	L	PF	PA	PD	Qualification
1	(Spain) Real Madrid	10	8	2	879	773	+106	Advance to Top 16
2	(Israel) Maccabi Electra	10	7	3	790	732	+58	Advance to Top 16
3	(Turkey) Anadolu Efes	10	5	5	721	751	−30	Advance to Top 16
4	(Italy) EA7 Milano	10	4	6	738	734	+4	Advance to Top 16
5	(Serbia) Partizan	10	4	6	739	774	−35	
6	(Belgium) Belgacom Spirou	10	2	8	729	832	−103	

Source: Euroleague

=== Group D ===
Pos	Team	Pld	W	L	PF	PA	PD	Qualification
1	(Spain) FC Barcelona Regal	10	9	1	793	599	+194	Advance to Top 16
2	(Italy) Montepaschi Siena	10	8	2	779	696	+83	Advance to Top 16
3	(Russia) UNICS	10	7	3	702	656	+46	Advance to Top 16
4	(Turkey) Galatasaray	10	4	6	694	736	−42	Advance to Top 16
5	(Poland) Asseco Prokom Gdynia	10	1	9	618	743	−125	
6	(Slovenia) Union Olimpija	10	1	9	589	745	−156	

Source: Euroleague

== Top 16 ==
The draw took place in Barcelona, Spain on 28 December 2011 at 13:00 CET. The sixteen qualified teams were divided into four seeds based on their final standings in the regular season. Teams coming from the same regular season group were kept from coinciding in the same Top 16 group and an effort was made to keep teams from the same country from coinciding as well. Teams from the same city, Anadolu Efes, Fenerbahçe Ülker and Galatasaray Medical Park from Istanbul; Olympiacos and Panathinaikos from Greater Athens, or teams playing in the same arena were prevented from playing both at home in the same matchday.

=== Group E ===
Pos	Team	Pld	W	L	PF	PA	PD	Qualification
1	(Russia) CSKA Moscow	6	5	1	509	413	+96	Advance to quarterfinals
2	(Greece) Olympiacos	6	3	3	457	471	−14	Advance to quarterfinals
3	(Turkey) Galatasaray	6	3	3	423	438	−15	
4	(Turkey) Anadolu Efes	6	1	5	387	454	−67	

Source: Euroleague

=== Group F ===
Pos	Team	Pld	W	L	PF	PA	PD	Qualification
1	(Italy) Montepaschi Siena	6	4	2	493	435	+58	Advance to quarterfinals
2	(Spain) Gescrap Bizkaia Bilbao	6	4	2	437	423	+14	Advance to quarterfinals
3	(Spain) Real Madrid	6	4	2	496	489	+7	
4	(Spain) Unicaja	6	0	6	407	486	−79	

Source: Euroleague

=== Group G ===
Pos	Team	Pld	W	L	PF	PA	PD	Qualification
1	(Greece) Panathinaikos	6	4	2	436	394	+42	Advance to quarterfinals
2	(Russia) UNICS	6	3	3	432	423	+9	Advance to quarterfinals
3	(Italy) EA7 Milano	6	3	3	379	390	−11	
4	(Turkey) Fenerbahçe Ülker	6	2	4	420	460	−40	

Source: Euroleague

=== Group H ===
Pos	Team	Pld	W	L	PF	PA	PD	Qualification
1	(Spain) FC Barcelona Regal	6	6	0	430	384	+46	Advance to quarterfinals
2	(Israel) Maccabi Electra	6	3	3	427	425	+2	Advance to quarterfinals
3	(Italy) Bennet Cantù	6	3	3	420	426	−6	
4	(Lithuania) Žalgiris	6	0	6	429	471	−42	

Source: Euroleague

== Quarterfinals ==
Team 1 hosted Games 1 and 2, plus Game 5 if necessary. Team 2 hosted Game 3, and Game 4 if necessary.

Team 1	Agg.	Team 2	1st leg	2nd leg	3rd leg	4th leg	5th leg
CSKA Moscow (Russia)	3–1	(Spain) Gescrap Bizkaia Bilbao	98–71	79–60	81–94	73–71	
Montepaschi Siena (Italy)	1–3	(Greece) Olympiacos	75–82	81–80	55–75	69–76	
Panathinaikos (Greece)	3–2	(Israel) Maccabi Electra	93–73	92–94	62–65	78–69	86–85
FC Barcelona Regal (Spain)	3–0	(Russia) UNICS	78–66	66–63	67–56		

== Final four ==
Semifinals; May 11
(Russia) CSKA Moscow	66
(Greece) Panathinaikos	64
(Greece) Olympiacos	68
(Spain) FC Barcelona Regal	64

Championship game May 13
(Russia) CSKA Moscow	61
(Greece) Olympiacos	62
Third place game
(Greece) Panathinaikos	69
(Spain) FC Barcelona Regal	74

== Individual statistics ==
=== Rating ===
Rank	Name	Team	Games	Rating	PIR
1.	(Russia) Andrei Kirilenko	(Russia) CSKA Moscow	17	411	24.18
2.	(Serbia) Nenad Krstić	(Russia) CSKA Moscow	22	405	18.41
3.	(North Macedonia) Bo McCalebb	(Italy) Montepaschi Siena	17	294	17.29

=== Points ===
Rank	Name	Team	Games	Points	PPG
1.	(North Macedonia) Bo McCalebb	(Italy) Montepaschi Siena	17	287	16.88
2.	(Greece) Vassilis Spanoulis	(Greece) Olympiacos	21	350	16.67
3.	(United States) Sonny Weems	(Lithuania) Žalgiris	15	233	15.53

=== Rebounds ===
Rank	Name	Team	Games	Rebounds	RPG
1.	(Russia) Andrei Kirilenko	(Russia) CSKA Moscow	17	127	7.47
2.	(United Kingdom) Joel Freeland	(Spain) Unicaja Málaga	14	95	6.79
3.	(Greece) Ioannis Bourousis	(Italy) EA7 Milano	15	96	6.40

=== Assists ===
Rank	Name	Team	Games	Assists	APG
1.	(Montenegro) Omar Cook	(Italy) EA7 Milano	16	91	5.69
2.	(Spain) Sergio Rodríguez	(Spain) Real Madrid	16	86	5.38
3.	(Serbia) Miloš Teodosić	(Russia) CSKA Moscow	22	110	5.00

=== Other Stats ===
Category	Name	Team	Games	Stat
Steals per game	(United States) Jamon Gordon	(Turkey) Galatasaray	16	1.81
Blocks per game	(Russia) Andrei Kirilenko	(Russia) CSKA Moscow	17	1.94
Turnovers per game	(Greece) Vassilis Spanoulis	(Greece) Olympiacos	21	3.67
Fouls drawn per game	(Greece) Vassilis Spanoulis	(Greece) Olympiacos	21	5.95
Minutes per game	(Bosnia and Herzegovina) Henry Domercant	(Russia) UNICS	19	31:56
2FG%	(Russia) Sasha Kaun	(Russia) CSKA Moscow	21	0.711
3FG%	(North Macedonia) Bo McCalebb	(Italy) Montepaschi Siena	17	0.526
3FG%	(Italy) Tomas Ress	(Italy) Montepaschi Siena	20	0.526
FT%	(Spain) Jorge Garbajosa	(Spain) Unicaja	14	1.000

=== Game highs ===
Category	Name	Team	Stat
Rating	(United States) Lynn Greer	(Russia) UNICS	43
Points	(United States) Lynn Greer	(Russia) UNICS	33
Rebounds	(Lithuania) Donatas Motiejūnas	(Poland) Asseco Prokom	21
Assists	(United States) John Linehan	(France) Nancy	15
Steals	3 occasions		6
Blocks	(Russia) Andrei Kirilenko	(Russia) CSKA Moscow	5
Blocks	(Spain) Serge Ibaka	(Spain) Real Madrid	5
Turnovers	(Greece) Vassilis Spanoulis	(Greece) Olympiacos	9
Turnovers	(France) Nicolas Batum	(France) Nancy	9
Fouls Drawn	3 occasions		12

== Awards ==
=== Euroleague 2011–12 MVP ===
- (Russia) Andrei Kirilenko ( (Russia) CSKA Moscow)

=== Euroleague 2011–12 Final Four MVP ===
- (Greece) Vassilis Spanoulis ( (Greece) Olympiacos)

=== All-Euroleague Team 2011–12 ===
Pos.	All-Euroleague First Team	Club Team	All-Euroleague Second Team	Club Team
G	(Greece) Dimitris Diamantidis	(Greece) Panathinaikos	(Serbia) Miloš Teodosić	(Russia) CSKA Moscow
G	(Greece) Vassilis Spanoulis	(Greece) Olympiacos	(North Macedonia) Bo McCalebb	(Italy) Montepaschi Siena
F	(Russia) Andrei Kirilenko	(Russia) CSKA Moscow	(Spain) Juan Carlos Navarro	(Spain) FC Barcelona
F	(Slovenia) Erazem Lorbek	(Spain) FC Barcelona	(Bosnia and Herzegovina) Henry Domercant	(Russia) UNICS
C	(Serbia) Nenad Krstić	(Russia) CSKA Moscow	(United States) Mike Batiste	(Greece) Panathinaikos

=== Top Scorer (Alphonso Ford Trophy) ===
- (North Macedonia) Bo McCalebb ( (Italy) Montepaschi Siena)

=== Best Defender ===
- (Russia) Andrei Kirilenko ( (Russia) CSKA Moscow)

=== Rising Star ===
- (Spain) Nikola Mirotić ( (Spain) Real Madrid)

=== Coach of the Year (Alexander Gomelsky Award) ===
- (Serbia) Dusan Ivković ( (Greece) Olympiacos)

=== MVP Weekly ===
==== Regular season ====
Game	Player	Team	PIR
1	(Russia) Andrei Kirilenko	(Russia) CSKA Moscow	37
2	(France) Nicolas Batum	(France) Nancy	36
3	(United States) Jordan Farmar	(Israel) Maccabi Electra	35
4	(France) Nicolas Batum (2)	(France) Nancy	35
5	(Russia) Andrei Kirilenko (2)	(Russia) CSKA Moscow	39
6	(Spain) Fernando San Emeterio	(Spain) Caja Laboral	36
7	(Slovenia) Erazem Lorbek	(Spain) FC Barcelona	25
7	(Serbia) Milan Mačvan	(Serbia) Partizan	25
8	(Spain) Nikola Mirotić	(Spain) Real Madrid	33
9	(Serbia) Nenad Krstić	(Russia) CSKA Moscow	31
10	(Italy) Pietro Aradori	(Italy) Montepaschi Siena	33

==== Top 16 ====
Game	Player	Team	PIR
1	(Belarus) Vladimir Veremeenko	(Russia) UNICS	32
2	(North Macedonia) Bo McCalebb	(Italy) Montepaschi Siena	36
3	(Serbia) Nenad Krstić (2)	(Russia) CSKA Moscow	31
4	(United States) Aaron Jackson	(Spain) Gescrap Bizkaia	28
5	(Montenegro) Omar Cook	(Italy) EA7 Milano	22
6	(Georgia (country)) Manuchar Markoishvili	(Italy) Bennet Cantù	35

==== Quarterfinals ====
Game	Player	Team	PIR
1	(Greece) Dimitris Diamantidis	(Greece) Panathinaikos	31
2	(Russia) Andrei Kirilenko (3)	(Russia) CSKA Moscow	31
3	(Greece) Kostas Vasileiadis	(Spain) Gescrap Bizkaia	21
4	(Russia) Andrei Kirilenko (4)	(Russia) CSKA Moscow	29
5	(Greece) Dimitris Diamantidis (2)	(Greece) Panathinaikos	34

=== MVP of the Month ===
Month	Player	Team
October 2011	(Russia) Andrei Kirilenko	(Russia) CSKA Moscow
November 2011	(Serbia) Nenad Krstić	(Russia) CSKA Moscow
December 2011	(Spain) Nikola Mirotić	(Spain) Real Madrid
January 2012	(Bosnia and Herzegovina) Henry Domercant	(Russia) UNICS
February 2012	(Greece) Vassilis Spanoulis	(Greece) Olympiacos
March 2012	(Greece) Dimitris Diamantidis	(Greece) Panathinaikos

== See also ==
- FIBA European Champions Cup and EuroLeague history
- Rosters of Top Teams in the European Club Competitions
- EuroLeague Finals
- European Cup and EuroLeague records and statistics
- EuroLeague Final Four
- EuroLeague Awards
- 2011–12 Eurocup Basketball
