= Drake Diener =

American basketball player and coach (born 1981)

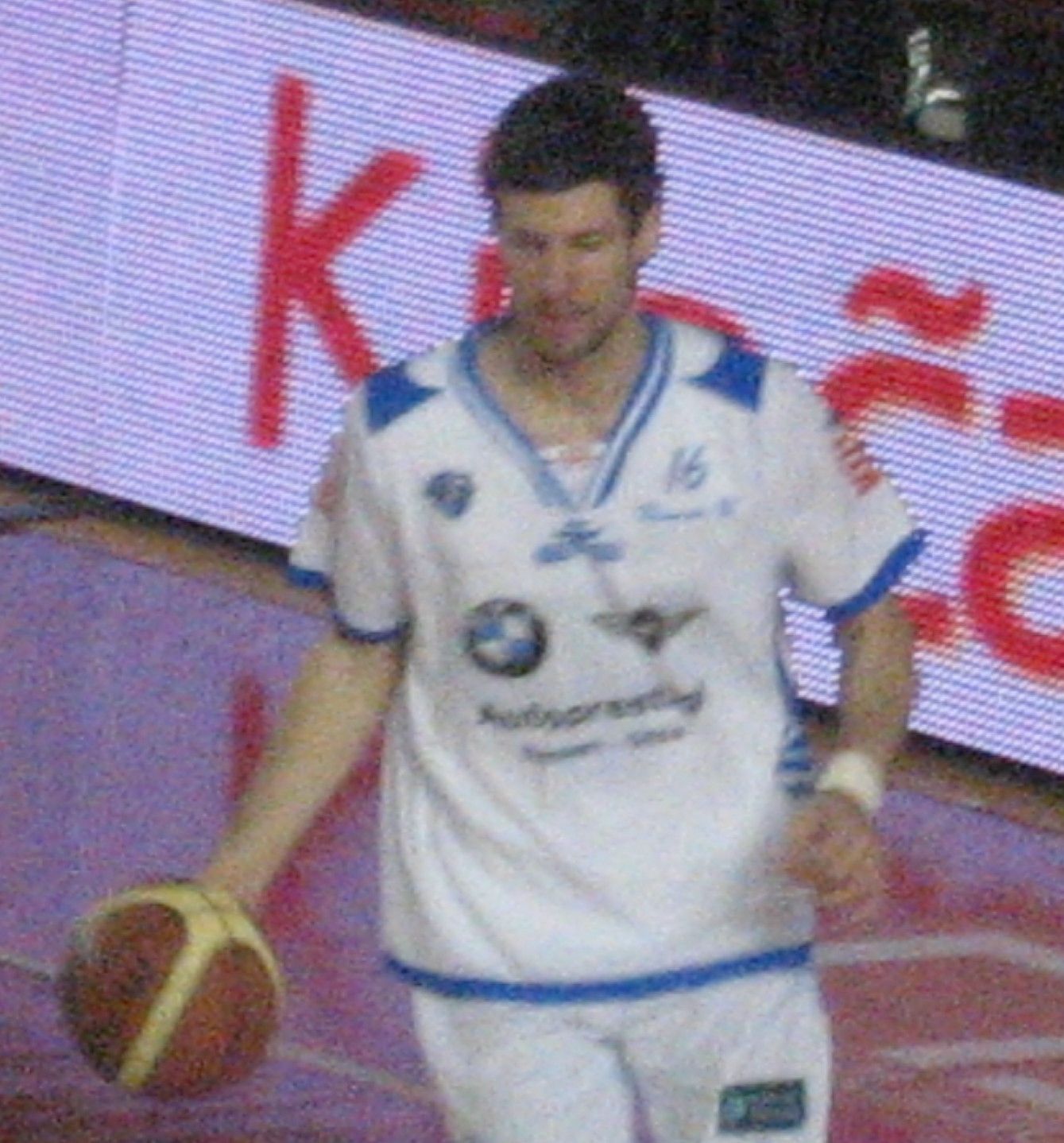
- Diener warming up with Dinamo Sassari in 2012

Personal information
- Born: December 19, 1981 (age 44) Fond du Lac, Wisconsin
- Listed height: 6 ft 5 in (1.96 m)
- Listed weight: 200 lb (91 kg)

Career information
- High school: Goodrich (Fond du Lac, Wisconsin)
- College: DePaul (2001–2005)
- NBA draft: 2005: undrafted
- Playing career: 2006–2018
- Position: Shooting guard
- Number: 16

Career history

Playing
- 2006–2007: Ignis Castelletto Ticino
- 2007–2008: Orlandina
- 2008: Montepaschi Siena
- 2008–2009: Scandone Avellino
- 2009–2011: Teramo
- 2011–2014: Dinamo Sassari
- 2014–2015: Reggiana
- 2015: Zaragoza
- 2016–2017: Orlandina
- 2017–2018: Vanoli Cremona

Coaching
- 2018–: Marian University

Career highlights
- As player: Italian League champion (2008); Italian Cup winner (2014); Italian League MVP (2014); Italian League Top Scorer (2014); 3× Italian All-Star Game (2011, 2014, 2015); Italian All Star Game 3 Point Champion (2014)

Drake Richard Diener (born December 19, 1981) is an American former professional basketball player and coach. He played college basketball at DePaul University.

== College career ==
Diener joined the DePaul Blue Demons in 2001, where he was nominated best player on the team in two consecutive years. In 2005, Diener was diagnosed with Crohn's disease. He underwent two surgical operations that took him off the court for one year.

== Professional career ==
In June 2006, Diener signed his first professional contract, with Ignis Castelletto Ticino of the Italian Second Division. Thanks to a good season there, in the following year he signed with Orlandina Basket, of the Italian First Division. In February 2008, he signed with Montepaschi Siena. During that season in Siena, Diener contributed to the team's championship in the Italian League, and a 3rd-place finish in the 2008 EuroLeague Final Four. In October 2008, Diener signed a one-year deal with Scandone Avellino, where he again had the chance to play in the EuroLeague.

In July 2009, Diener signed a two-year deal with Teramo Basket. During his stay in Abruzzo, he enjoyed great success, confirming himself as one of the best players in the Italian League, and being the main contributor to Teramo's remaining in the Italian top division.

In July 2011, he signed a one-year deal with Dinamo Sassari, where he reunited with his cousin, and former NBA point guard Travis Diener. In June 2012, he re-signed with Sassari, for one more season. In July 2013, he again re-signed with Sassari, that time for two years.

On March 16, 2014, Diener scored 44 points against Reyer Venezia Mestre, marking his career high. He helped his team to win the Italian Cup in 2014. He was also named the regular season MVP of the 2013–14 Italian League season. In June 2014, he left Dinamo Sassari.

On July 23, 2014, Diener signed with Pallacanestro Reggiana. He was released by the club on June 30, 2015. On August 23, 2015, Diener signed with CAI Zaragoza, of the Spanish top-tier level Liga ACB. On December 29, 2015, he parted ways with Zaragoza, after averaging 6.1 points per game in the ACB.

On July 13, 2016, Diener signed with Orlandina Basket, for the 2016–17 Italian League season. On June 26, 2017, Diener signed with Vanoli Cremona.

== Coaching career ==
On April 30, 2018, Diener was named the men's basketball head coach at NCAA Division III school Marian University, in Fond du Lac, WI. He replaced Mark Boyle, who spent 30 years leading the Sabres.

== Personal ==
Diener suffered from Crohn's disease. During his 2 years in Teramo, he earned the nickname of "Il Drago" (the Dragon), due to the similar sound of his first name to the Italian word. His cousin Travis Diener, also played with Dinamo Sassari. His brother-in-law, Andy Schmidt, was an All Conference wide Receiver for the Fond du Lac Cardinals.
