= PalaFermi =

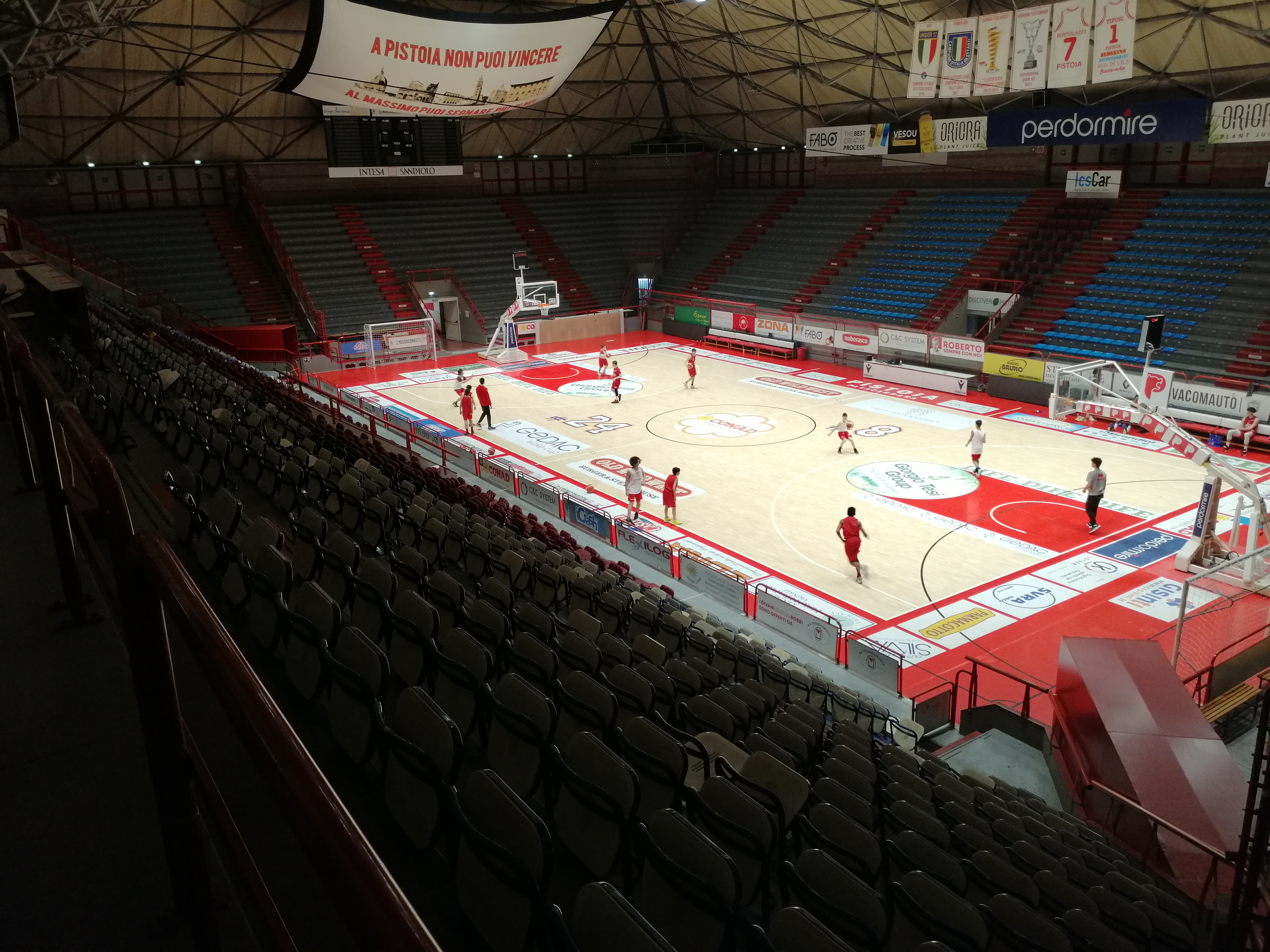

The PalaFermi is the sports hall of Pistoia, Italy, and is located in the main part of the industrial city (Saint-Augustin). It was built in 1988 to record the matches of the Olimpia basketball team in Pistoia, which the previous year offered the promotion to the A2 division.
