= 2011–12 Eurocup Basketball Quarterfinals =

The quarterfinals were two-legged ties determined on aggregate score. The first legs were played on March 20. The return legs were played on March 27. The group winners in each tie, listed as "Team #1", hosted the second leg.

Team #1	Agg.	Team #2	1st leg	2nd leg
Valencia Basket (Spain)	156–138	(Montenegro) Budućnost Voli	71–75	85–63
Donetsk (Ukraine)	145–154	(Lithuania) Lietuvos Rytas	65–76	80–78
Spartak St. Petersburg (Russia)	154–135	(Czech Republic) ČEZ Nymburk	68–64	86–71
Lokomotiv-Kuban (Russia)	153–158	(Russia) Khimki	72–81	81–77

All times are CET (UTC+1).

== Game 1 ==
19 March 2012
19:00

Report

ČEZ Nymburk (Czech Republic)	64–68	(Russia) Spartak St. Petersburg
Scoring by quarter: 21–17, 18–26, 9–16, 16–9
Pts: Simmons 23; Rebs: Wilson 6 Asts: Lawrence, Simmons 3		Pts: Beverley 19; Rebs: Keyru 6 Asts: Strēlnieks 4

ČEZ Aréna, Pardubice
Attendance: 3,165
Referees: Miguel Perez (ESP), Juan Carlos Garcia Gonzalez (ESP), Marcin Kowalski (POL)

20 March 2012
16:00

Report

Khimki (Russia)	81–72	(Russia) Lokomotiv-Kuban
Scoring by quarter: 18–21, 22–21, 19–18, 22–12
Pts: Kelati 20; Rebs: Monia 7 Asts: Quinn 5		Pts: Massey, Rivers 14; Rebs: Traore 8 Asts: Ilievski 5

Basketball Center of Moscow Region, Khimki
Attendance: 2,850
Referees: Christos Christodoulou (GRE), Sinisa Herceg (CRO), Petri Mantyla (FIN)

20 March 2012
18:00

Report

Lietuvos Rytas (Lithuania)	76–65	(Ukraine) Donetsk
Scoring by quarter: 18–9, 23–22, 20–18, 15–16
Pts: Babrauskas 15; Rebs: Valančiūnas 10; Asts: Rice 7		Pts: Radenović 16; Rebs: Radenović 10; Asts: Avdalović 4

Siemens Arena, Vilnius
Attendance: 9,200
Referees: Recep Ankarali (TUR), Milivoje Jovcic (SRB), Damir Javor (SLO)

20 March 2012
18:30

Report

Budućnost Voli (Montenegro)	75–71	(Spain) Valencia Basket
Scoring by quarter: 20–21, 20–18, 14–22, 21–10
Pts: Dubljević 15; Rebs: Dubljević 8 Asts: A. Popović, Anderson 3		Pts: de Colo 12; Rebs: Claver 7 Asts: Marković 7

Morača Sports Center, Podgorica
Attendance: 3,100
Referees: Guerrino Cerebuch (ITA), Elias Koromilas (GRE), Tomas Trawicki (POL)

== Game 2 ==
27 March 2012
17:00

Report

Spartak St. Petersburg (Russia)	86–71	(Czech Republic) ČEZ Nymburk
Scoring by quarter: 21–18, 23–21, 26–17, 16–15
Pts: Strēlnieks, Halperin 19; Rebs: Beverley 7 Asts: Halperin 7		Pts: Simmons 22; Rebs: Pumprla, Simmons 7 Asts: Lawrence 7

Yubileyny Sports Palace, Saint Petersburg
Attendance: 2,700
Referees: Sreten Radovic (CRO), Roberto Chiari (ITA), Radomir Vojinovic (MNE)

27 March 2012
17:00

Report

Lokomotiv-Kuban (Russia)	81–77	(Russia) Khimki
Scoring by quarter: 22–24, 11–22, 26–16, 22–15
Pts: Traore 22; Rebs: Massey 8 Asts: Rivers 2		Pts: Fridzon 17; Rebs: Fridzon 7 Asts: Quinn 5

Olympus Arena, Krasnodar
Attendance: 4,000
Referees: Daniel Hierrezuelo (ESP), Spiros Gkontas (GRE), Rustu Nuran (TUR)

27 March 2012
18:00

Report

Donetsk (Ukraine)	80–78	(Lithuania) Lietuvos Rytas
Scoring by quarter: 17–28, 17–13, 13–13, 33–24
Pts: Curry 26; Rebs: Radenović 8 Asts: Avdalović, Radenović 4		Pts: Rice 14; Rebs: Valančiūnas 7 Asts: Rice 5

Druzhba Palace of Sports, Donetsk
Attendance: 4,000
Referees: Vicente Bulto (ESP), Antonio Conde (ESP), Zdravko Rutesic (MNE)

27 March 2012
20:30

Report

Valencia Basket (Spain)	85–63	(Montenegro) Budućnost Voli
Scoring by quarter: 28–11, 16–17, 28–14, 13–21
Pts: Claver 13; Rebs: Caner-Medley 8 Asts: de Colo 5		Pts: Dubljević 17; Rebs: Vitkovac 6 Asts: Anderson 5

Pabellon Municipal Fuente San Luis, Valencia
Attendance: 8,800
Referees: Luis Lopes (POR), Boris Shulga (UKR), Panagiotis Anastopoulos (GRE)
