= Marko Popović (basketball, born 1985) =

Montenegrin basketball player

Personal information
- Born: October 10, 1985 (age 41) Titograd, SFR Yugoslavia
- Listed height: 2.00 m (6 ft 7 in)

Career information
- NBA draft: 2007: undrafted
- Playing career: 2003–2019
- Position: Power forward
- Number: 6, 14

Career history
- 2003–2014: Budućnost Podgorica
- 2015–2016: Ulcinj
- 2016–2017: Bashkimi
- 2017: Cherkaski Mavpy
- 2018–2019: Zlatorog Laško
- 2019: Prievidza

Career highlights
- 8× Montenegrin League champion (2007–2014); 7× Montenegrin Cup winner (2007–2012, 2014)

Marko Popović (Cyrillic: Марко Поповић; born October 10, 1985) is a Montenegrin former professional basketball player, who spent the majority of his 16-year professional career playing for Budućnost Podgorica of the Prva A Liga and the ABA League. He also had brief stints in Kosovo, Slovenia, and Slovakia at the end of his playing career.
