= Riccardo Cortese =

Italian scientist and entrepreneur

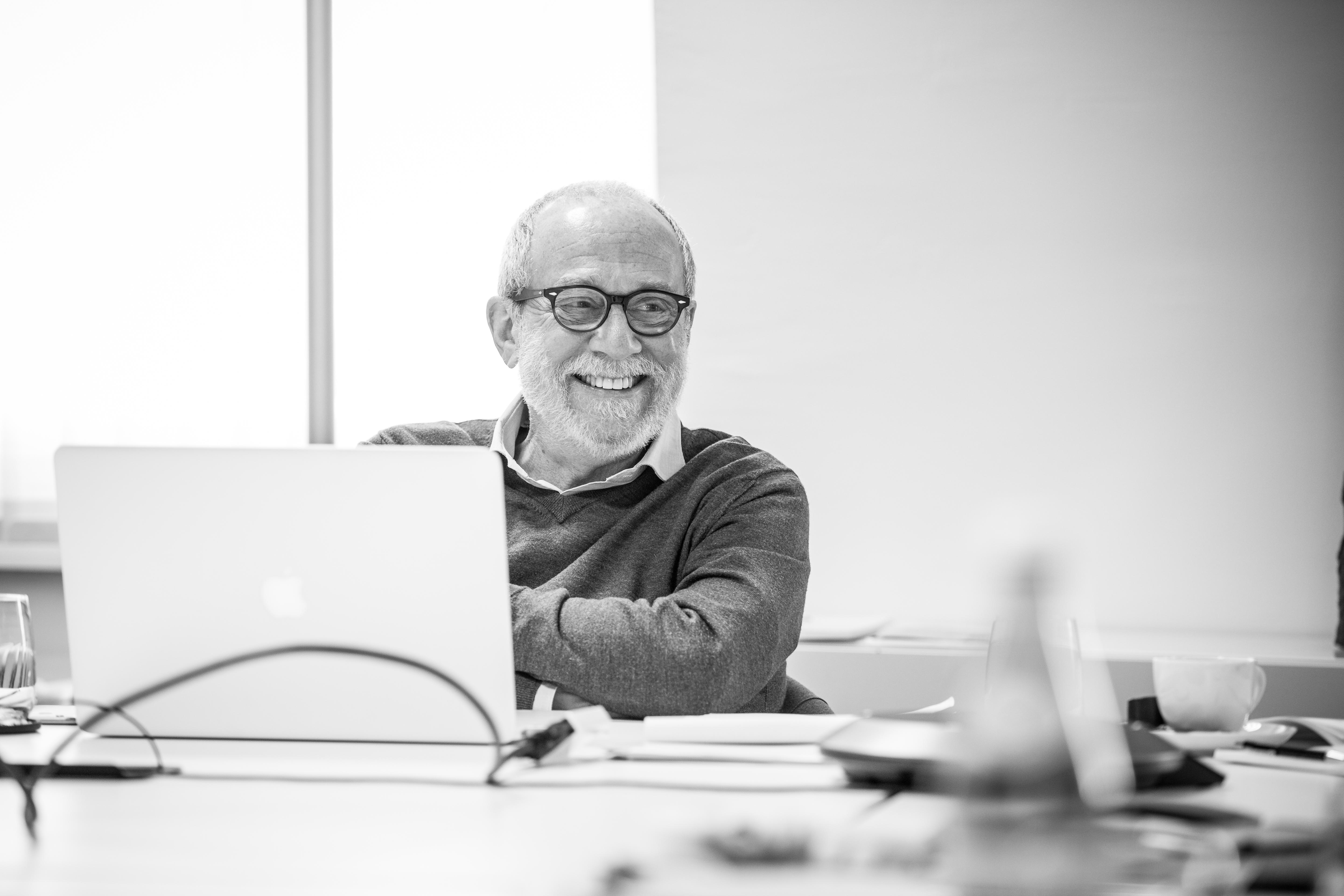
- Born: March 29, 1944; Siena, Italy
- Died: April 27, 2017 (aged 73); Basel, Switzerland
- Education: University of Naples, University of California Berkeley
- Known for: Development of therapeutic strategies for viral infections; Pioneering platform technology for prophylactic and therapeutic vaccines based on simian adenoviral vectors
- Awards: Assobiotec Award (2017)
- Scientific career
- Fields: Molecular biology, gene expression, drug discovery, genetic vaccines
- Workplaces: EMBL-Heidelberg, Istituto di Ricerche di Biologia Molecolare, Okairos, Nouscom
- Doctoral advisor: Bruce Ames
- Other academic advisors: Max Perutz, John Gurdon, Fred Sanger, Sydney Brenner

Riccardo Cortese (Siena, Italy, March 29, 1944 – Basel, Switzerland, April 27, 2017) was an Italian scientist, entrepreneur, and innovator in the field of gene expression, drug discovery and genetic vaccines. His work led to the development of novel therapeutic strategies for the prevention and cure of viral infections, including HIV, HCV, Ebola and RSV. He pioneered a novel platform technology based on simian adenoviral vectors for prophylactic and therapeutic vaccines, and authored more than 300 publications in peer-reviewed journals in the field of gene expression, transcriptional control, molecular virology and immunology.

== Education ==
Riccardo Cortese received his medical degree in 1968 from the University of Naples, Italy. Shortly after, he joined the lab of Bruce Ames at the University of California Berkeley as a PhD student, where he studied transcriptional regulation and RNA post-transcriptional modification in bacteria. In 1973, he returned to Naples as an assistant professor at the Institute of Biochemistry of the II Medical School, where he pursued research efforts investigating post-transcriptional modifications of tRNA dealing in particular with tRNA pseudouridylation.

== Scientific career ==
In 1976 he took a post-doctoral position at the MRC Laboratory of Molecular Biology in Cambridge, England, where he forged lasting professional relationships with leading figures in Molecular biology, including Max Perutz, John Gurdon, Fred Sanger and Sydney Brenner. While at the MRC, his research focus was the maturation of tRNAs in eukaryotic systems.

In 1979 Cortese was recruited as Group Leader at the EMBL-Heidelberg, and subsequently established and directed the Gene Expression Programme (now the Genome Biology Unit).

During this period, Cortese and his lab published numerous seminal papers on the transcriptional regulation of RNA polymerase III-transcribed genes and on liver-specific gene expression. To identify gene products enriched in the liver, he undertook the first ever direct DNA sequencing experiment on tissue-specific cDNAs libraries.

In 1990, Cortese left EMBL to found and direct the Istituto di Ricerche di Biologia Molecolare (IRBM) in Pomezia (Rome, Italy), a joint venture between Merck and Sigma Tau, where he remained until 2006. In 2000, Merck bought out the shares it did not own in IRBM, making it a fully owned subsidiary.

At IRBM, Cortese created an internationally renowned research center with approximately 200 employees. IRBM's research focus was the development of drugs and vaccines for the treatment of infectious diseases. He used Phage display technology to isolate peptides for diagnostic and vaccination purposes.

A substantial research effort at IRBM was in drug discovery aimed at identifying inhibitors of the hepatitis C virus (HCV), a virus that had been recently discovered but not yet fully characterized. The work at IRBM elucidated key features of the HCV replication cycle and infection mechanisms and positioned the IRBM among the leading research centers in the field of HCV. This work would later inform the development of a novel class of antiretroviral agents, HIV integrase inhibitors, and ultimately of an approved drug product, Isentress, the first anti-integrase of HIV to reach the market.

In his last years at IRBM, Cortese oversaw the development of a new approach to vaccines based on chimpanzee adenoviral vectors. This became the founding idea of Okairos, a biotech company that he founded in 2007 upon leaving IRBM.

With Okairos, Cortese made major scientific contributions, establishing a successful pipeline of candidate vaccines against HCV, malaria, RSV and Ebola. These vaccines were tested in animal models and in clinical trials, demonstrating safety and immunogenicity

The success of Okairos led to its acquisition by Glaxo-Smith Kline (GSK) in 2013; from that date the company changed its name to ReiThera, and continued independent work in the further development and manufacture of viral vector-based therapeutics and vaccines.

In 2015, Cortese founded a new company, Nouscom, dedicated to the generation of anti-cancer vaccines.

During his career, Cortese received many academic and professional recognitions. Among others, he was elected member of the Academia Europaea; associate foreign member of the Academie des Sciences; elected Member of the Council of the European Molecular Biology Organization; President of the Italian Society of Life Science (FISV); and recipient of the Assobiotec Award in 2017.

== Death ==
Cortese died in Basel, Switzerland on April 27, 2017, of metastatic cancer. He was survived by his wife of almost 50 years, Karen Jonkman, two children, and five grandchildren.
