= Dôme (Charleroi) =

Indoor arena

DÔME

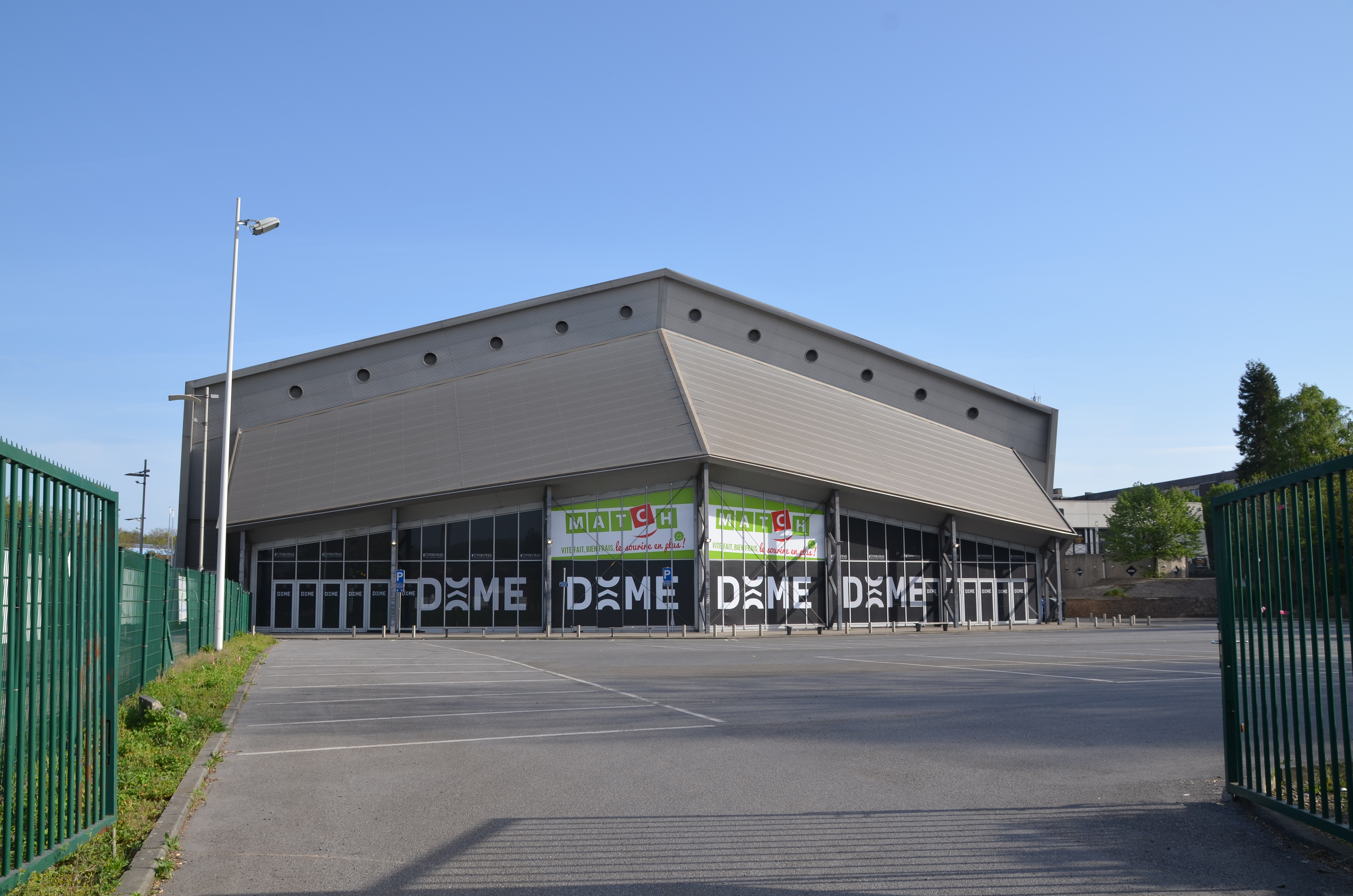
- Interactive map of DÔME
- Full name: Palais des sports du Pays de Charleroi
- Former names: La Coupole (1992–2002); RTL Spiroudome (2002–2019)
- Location: Charleroi, Belgium
- Coordinates: 50°25′26.48″N 4°26′46.36″E
- Capacity: 6,300

Construction
- Opened: 5 April 1992
- Renovated: 2002
- Expanded: 2002

Tenant
- Spirou Charleroi (PBL)

Website
- www.dome-events.be

The DÔME is an indoor arena that is located in Charleroi, Belgium. It currently can seat 6,300 spectators (5,440 fan seats, 160 lodge seats, 700 business seats). It is mainly used to host indoor sporting events such as tennis and basketball and concerts.

However, since they switch the name to DÔME in March 2019, the Arena is also used for a wide range of activities such as conferences, seminaire, enterprise dinner and much more.

== History ==
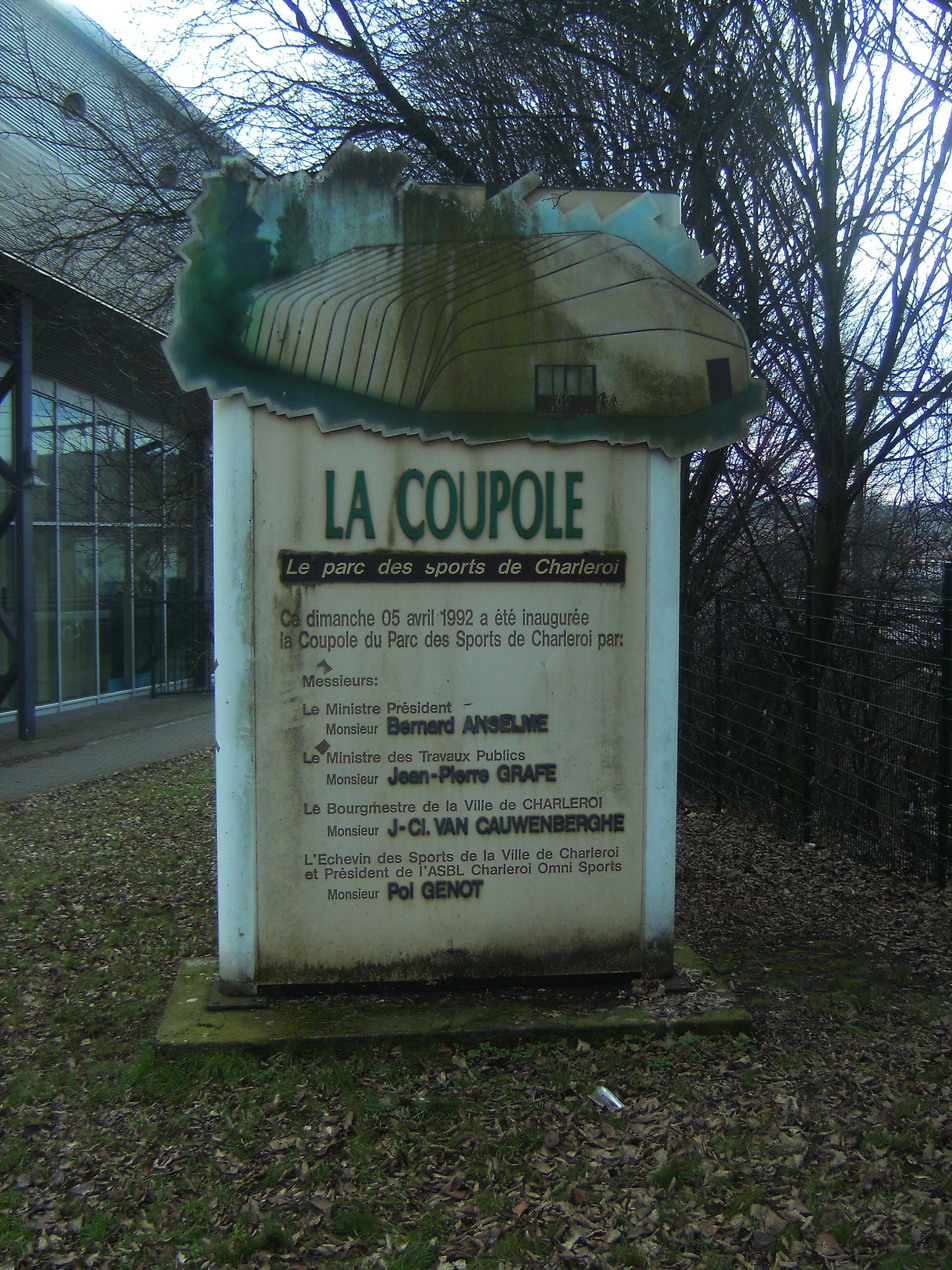
Memorial stone for the opening of the hall on April 5, 1992

Originally designed as an indoor tennis court for a Nick Bollettieri Tennis Academy; the hall became too small, especially for the requirements of the Spirou Charleroi basketball team and for this reason the arena was expanded in 2002. The concrete dome was built over the existing building, the game operation was not affected.

Spiroudome opened in 2002. The arena hosted the annual ULEB Cup Finals (later renamed to EuroCup Finals) from 2004 to 2008. It has been used as the long-time home arena of the Belgian professional basketball club, Spirou Charleroi.

It has hosted various Fed Cup and Davis Cup ties, among them the 2006 Fed Cup Final.

== See also ==
- List of indoor arenas in Belgium
