= Eurocup Basketball 2009–10 regular season =

Standings and results of the Regular Season of the Eurocup Basketball 2009–10 basketball tournament.

Key to colors
Top two places in each group advance to Top 16
Eliminated

All times given below are in Central European Time.

== Group A ==
	Team	Pld	W	L	PF	PA	Diff
1.	(Germany) ALBA Berlin	6	5	1	463	459	+4
2.	(Turkey) Galatasaray Café Crown	6	3	3	525	519	+6
3.	(Italy) BancaTercas Teramo	6	2	4	480	482	−2
4.	(Ukraine) BC Azovmash Mariupol	6	2	4	496	504	−8

Game 1

24 November 2009
19:00

Report

Galatasaray Café Crown (Turkey)	96–82	(Ukraine) BC Azovmash Mariupol
Scoring by quarter: 31-22, 18-16, 21-28, 26-16
Pts: Rancik 39; Rebs: Rancik, Jasaitis 7 Asts: four players with 3		Pts: Daniels 26; Rebs: Daniels 9 Asts: House 8

Ahmet Cömert Sport Hall
Attendance: 1,000
Referees: Fabio Facchini (ITA), Marcin Kowalski (POL), Aleksandar Milojevik (MKD)

24 November 2009
20:00

Report

ALBA Berlin (Germany)	75–73	(Italy) BancaTercas Teramo
Scoring by quarter: 15-20, 23-13, 19-24, 18-16
Pts: Jenkins 18; Rebs: Dojčin 6 Asts: Hamann 5		Pts: Hoover, Diener 15; Rebs: Young 6 Asts: Poeta 7

O_{2} World
Attendance: 10,144
Referees: Ilija Belošević (SRB), Sergiy Chebyshev (UKR), Petar Obradovic (BIH)

Game 2

1 December 2009
17:00

Report

BC Azovmash Mariupol (Ukraine)	73–74	(Germany) ALBA Berlin
Scoring by quarter: 31-22, 10-18, 17-16, 15-18
Pts: Rizvić 22; Rebs: Rizvić 8 Asts: House 6		Pts: Jenkins 22; Rebs: Sekulić, Bajramović 6 Asts: McElroy 5

Azovmash Arena
Attendance: 2,504
Referees: Recep Ankarali (TUR), Nikola Lepetic (SRB), Seffi Shemmesh (ISR)

1 December 2009
20:45

Report

BancaTercas Teramo (Italy)	95–87	(Turkey) Galatasaray Café Crown
Scoring by quarter: 25-25, 23-20, 26-22, 21-20
Pts: Jones 21; Rebs: Amoroso 6 Asts: Hoover, Poeta, Diener 5		Pts: Wilkinson 25; Rebs: Jasaitis 9 Asts: Washington 5

PalaScapriano
Referees: Andrej Lovsyn (SLO), Spiros Gontas (GRE), Damir Javor (SLO)

Game 3

8 December 2009
18:30

Report

ALBA Berlin (Germany)	87–77	(Turkey) Galatasaray Café Crown
Scoring by quarter: 23-17, 14-20, 25-20, 25-20
Pts: Jenkins, Chubb, McElroy 16; Rebs: Jenkins 8 Asts: Jenkins, McElroy 5		Pts: Wilkinson 20; Rebs: Wilkinson 8 Asts: Washington 5

O_{2} World
Attendance: 10,340
Referees: Sradan Dozai (CRO), Nicolas Maestre (FRA), Marko Juras (SRB)

8 December 2009
20:45

Report

BancaTercas Teramo (Italy)	85–77	(Ukraine) BC Azovmash Mariupol
Scoring by quarter: 27-18, 16-23, 15-21, 27-15
Pts: Jones, Stanescu 16; Rebs: Stanescu 10; Asts: Poeta 6		Pts: Daniels 23; Rebs: Daniels 10; Asts: Jarutis, Skutelnik 4

PalaScapriano
Attendance: Juan Carlos Mitjana (ESP), Ademir Zurapović (SRB), Regis Bardera (FRA)

Game 4

15 December 2009
17:00

Report

BC Azovmash Mariupol (Ukraine)	90–82	(Italy) BancaTercas Teramo
Scoring by quarter: 21-19, 26-24, 22-23, 21-16
Pts: Rizvić 24; Rebs: Rizvić 11; Asts: Rice 8		Pts: Diener 29; Rebs: Jones, Diener 10; Asts: Poeta 5

Azovmash Arena
Attendance: 2,350
Referees: Murat Biricik (TUR), Marius Ciulin (ROU), Laurentiu Grigoras (ROU)

15 December 2009
19:00

Report

Galatasaray Café Crown (Turkey)	93–79	(Germany) ALBA Berlin
Scoring by quarter: 28-20, 16-18, 19-21, 30-20
Pts: Washington 31; Rebs: Washington 8 Asts: Büker 7		Pts: Wright 13; Rebs: Sekulić 6 Asts: McElroy 5

Ahmet Cömert Sport Hall
Attendance: 200
Referees: Luigi Lamonica (ITA), Lahdo Sharro (SWE), Sergiy Zashchuck (UKR)

Game 5

5 January 2009
17:00

Report

BC Azovmash Mariupol (Ukraine)	96–85	(Turkey) Galatasaray Café Crown
Scoring by quarter: 24-21, 22-19, 20-15, 30-30
Pts: Daniels 29; Rebs: Daniels 13; Asts: Skutyelnik 9		Pts: Rančík 17; Rebs: Rančík 8 Asts: Büker 4

Azovmash Arena
Attendance: 2,800
Referees: Marek Ćmikiewicz (POL), Siniša Herceg (CRO), Oskars Lucis (LAT)

5 January 2009
20:45

Report

BancaTercas Teramo (Italy)	65–66	(Germany) ALBA Berlin
Scoring by quarter: 23-17, 16-19, 14-12, 12-18
Pts: Jones 22; Rebs: Young 9 Asts: Poeta 5		Pts: Jenkins 17; Rebs: McElroy 6 Asts: four players with 2

PalaScapriano
Referees: Ilija Belošević (SRB), Matej Boltauzer (SLO), Joseph Bissang (FRA)

Game 6

12 January 2009
19:00

Report

Galatasaray Café Crown (Turkey)	87–80	(Italy) BancaTercas Teramo
Scoring by quarter: 26-23, 16-22, 20-16, 25-19
Pts: Jasaitis 25; Rebs: Rančík, Jasaitis 8 Asts: Washington 7		Pts: Hoover 21; Rebs: Diener, Jurak 6 Asts: Poeta 4

Abdi İpekçi Arena
Attendance: 1,700
Referees: Sreten Radović (CRO), Roman Kolar (SLO), Omer Esteron (ISR)

12 January 2009
19:00

Report

ALBA Berlin (Germany)	82–78	(Ukraine) BC Azovmash Mariupol
Scoring by quarter: 17-23, 20-20, 24-19, 21-16
Pts: Jenkins 17; Rebs: Sekulić 7 Asts: Dojčin, McElroy 2		Pts: Alexander 21; Rebs: Daniels 12; Asts: Jarutis 7

O_{2} World
Attendance: 9,684
Referees: Jakub Zamojski (POL), Miguel Angel Perez Niz (ESP), Francisco Arana (ESP)

== Group B ==
	Team	Pld	W	L	PF	PA	Diff	Tie-break
1.	(Spain) Power Elec Valencia	6	5	1	420	411	+9	
2.	(France) Le Mans	6	3	3	482	445	+37	1–1, +12
3.	(Russia) BC Triumph Lyubertsy	6	3	3	430	473	−43	1–1, –12
4.	(Serbia) KK Hemofarm Stada	6	1	5	477	480	−3	

Game 1

24 November 2009
18:00

Report

KK Hemofarm Stada (Serbia)	68–75	(Spain) Power Elec Valencia
Scoring by quarter: 20-19, 16-8, 14-27, 18-21
Pts: Jagodnik 17; Rebs: Katić 6 Asts: Pavković 4		Pts: de Colo 20; Rebs: Claver 7 Asts: Claver 3

Millennium Center
Attendance: 2,000
Referees: Costas Mouzakis (GRE), Sradan Dozai (CRO), Miroslav Tomov (BUL)

24 November 2009
20:30

Report

Le Mans (France)	74–77	(Russia) BC Triumph Lyubertsy
Scoring by quarter: 18-18, 23-15, 22-20, 11-24
Pts: Spencer, Batista 17; Rebs: Batista, Salyers 8 Asts: Wright 6		Pts: Rush 18; Rebs: Nesterov 8 Asts: Rush 6

Antarès
Attendance: 3,850
Referees: Emilio Pérez Pizarro (ESP), Andrej Jeršan (SLO), Francisco Arana (ESP)

Game 2

1 December 2009
17:00

Report

BC Triumph Lyubertsy (Russia)	83–82	(Serbia) KK Hemofarm Stada
Scoring by quarter: 15-27, 25-19, 21-20, 22-16
Pts: Rush 22; Rebs: Vyaltsev 8 Asts: Sergeev 9		Pts: Stevenson 19; Rebs: Stevenson 5 Asts: Pavković, Marković, Krstović 4

SH Triumph
Attendance: 1,554
Referees: Romualdas Brazauskas (LTU), Petri Mäntylä (FIN), Arnis Ozols (LAT)

1 December 2009
20:45

Report

Power Elec Valencia (Spain)	74–73	(France) Le Mans
Scoring by quarter: 15-23, 23-18, 18-19, 18-13
Pts: Claver 15; Rebs: Lishouk 7 Asts: Marinović 5		Pts: Spencer 23; Rebs: Yango 7 Asts: Wright 5

Pabellon Municipal Fuente San Luis
Attendance: 6,000
Referees: Fernando Rocha (POR), Roberto Chiari (ITA), Gianluca Mattioli (ITA)

Game 3

8 December 2009
17:0

Report

BC Triumph Lyubertsy (Russia)	59–67	(Spain) Power Elec Valencia
Scoring by quarter: 13-17, 9-29, 24-4, 13-17
Pts: Rush 17; Rebs: Bashminov, Vyaltsev 6 Asts: Rush, Mateyunas, Sergeev 3		Pts: de Colo, Nielsen 13; Rebs: Nielsen 7 Asts: Marinović, Nielsen 3

SH Triumph
Attendance: 1,702
Referees: Volodymr Drabikovsky(UKR), Radomir Vojinovic (MNE), Laurentiu Grigoras (ROU)

8 December 2009
20:30

Report

Le Mans (France)	92–90	(Serbia) KK Hemofarm Stada
Scoring by quarter: 26-32, 26-16, 18-21, 22-21
Pts: Salyers 22; Rebs: Rupert, Salyers 7 Asts: Wright, Spencer 4		Pts: Krstović, Jagodnik 16; Rebs: Marković, Mačvan, Marjanović 6 Asts: Marković 8

Antarès
Attendance: 3,800
Referees: Gianpaolo Cicoria (ITA), Antonio Conde (ESP), Jurgis Laurinavicius (LTU)

Game 4

15 December 2009
18:00

Report

KK Hemofarm Stada (Serbia)	88–76	(France) Le Mans
Scoring by quarter: 28-21, 23-16, 14-15, 23-24
Pts: Krstović 16; Rebs: Stevenson 7 Asts: Marković 7		Pts: Spencer 27; Rebs: Wright 7 Asts: Spencer 3

Millennium Center
Attendance: 1,200
Referees: Sreten Radović (CRO), Matej Boltauzer (SLO), Rüstü Nuran (TUR)

15 December 2009
20:45

Report

Power Elec Valencia (Spain)	85–60	(Russia) BC Triumph Lyubertsy
Scoring by quarter: 24-20, 24-13, 17-15, 20-12
Pts: Lishouk 18; Rebs: Claver 11; Asts: Martínez, Nielsen 4		Pts: Sergeev, Nesterov 15; Rebs: Nesterov 11; Asts: four players with 3

Pabellon Municipal Fuente San Luis
Attendance: 5,350
Referees: Shmuel Bachar (ISR), Olegs Latisevs (LAT), Zdravko Rutešić (MNE)

Game 5

5 January 2009
17:00

Report

BC Triumph Lyubertsy (Russia)	72–87	(France) Le Mans
Scoring by quarter: 24-23, 11-6, 23-22, 14-36
Pts: Rush 18; Rebs: Rush 11; Asts: Rush 6		Pts: Spencer 26; Rebs: Batista 10; Asts: Wright 6

SH Triumph
Attendance: 1,854
Referees: Leonidas Spiridonos (GRE), Petar Obradovic (BIH), Elias Koromilas (GRE)

5 January 2009
20:00

Report

Power Elec Valencia (Spain)	75–71	(Serbia) KK Hemofarm Stada
Scoring by quarter: 18-23, 25-16, 13-14, 19-18
Pts: Marinović 23; Rebs: Claver 5 Asts: Kelati 3		Pts: Marković, Mačvan, Marjanović 14; Rebs: Jagodnik 7 Asts: Marković 6

Pabellon Municipal Fuente San Luis
Attendance: 4,000
Referees: Paolo Taurino (ITA), Boris Shulga (UKR), Regis Bardera (FRA)

Game 6

12 January 2009
19:00

Report

Le Mans (France)	80–44	(Spain) Power Elec Valencia
Scoring by quarter: 32-12, 17-12, 18-15, 13-5
Pts: Spencer 20; Rebs: Batista 10; Asts: Diot 8		Pts: Claver 9 Rebs: Piétrus 7 Asts: Simeón 2

Antarès
Attendance: 4,350
Referees: Guerrino Cerebuch (ITA), Carmelo Paternico (ITA), Oliver Krause (GER)

12 January 2009
19:00

Report

KK Hemofarm Stada (Serbia)	78–79	(Russia) BC Triumph Lyubertsy
Scoring by quarter: 25-12, 17-22, 19-8, 17-37
Pts: Borisov 15; Rebs: Marjanović 9 Asts: Marković 7		Pts: Rush 27; Rebs: Miller 14; Asts: Sergeev 4

Millennium Center
Attendance: 2,100
Referees: Christos Christodoulou (GRE), Murat Biricik (TUR), Oskars Lucis (LAT)

== Group C ==
	Team	Pld	W	L	PF	PA	Diff	Tie-break
1.	(Greece) Aris BSA 2003	6	5	1	492	450	+42	
2.	(Israel) Hapoel Jerusalem	6	3	3	503	487	+16	1–1, +2
3.	(Croatia) KK Zadar	6	3	3	500	486	+14	1–1, –2
4.	(Lithuania) BC Šiauliai	6	1	5	494	566	−72	

Game 1

24 November 2009
18:10

Report

Hapoel Jerusalem (Israel)	89–76	(Lithuania) BC Šiauliai
Scoring by quarter: 19-13, 20-18, 22-26, 27-19
Pts: Simmons 19; Rebs: Thompson 11; Asts: Naimy 5		Pts: Low 20; Rebs: Brown 11; Asts: Low 4

Malha Arena
Attendance: 2,700
Referees: Volodymr Drabikovsky (UKR), Murat Biricik (TUR), Radomir Vojinovic(MNE)

24 November 2009
19:00

Report

KK Zadar (Croatia)	68–73	(Greece) Aris BSA 2003
Scoring by quarter: 24-19, 13-18, 16-21, 15-15
Pts: Car 17; Rebs: Boisa 7 Asts: Rančić, Perić, Stipčević 2		Pts: Clark 16; Rebs: Betts, Kakiouzis 5 Asts: Dixon 2

Krešimir Ćosić Hall
Attendance: 3,500
Referees: Saša Pukl (SLO), Roberto Chiari (ITA), Dragan Nešković (SRB),

Game 2

1 December 2009
18:15

Report

BC Šiauliai (Lithuania)	91–95	(Croatia) KK Zadar
Scoring by quarter: 21-25, 22-27, 20-20, 28-23
Pts: Low 19; Rebs: Brown, Gailius 5 Asts: Low 3		Pts: Stipčević 27; Rebs: Perić 6 Asts: Stipčević 5

Šiaulių arena
Attendance: 5,000
Referees: Luigi Lamonica (ITA), Apostolos Kalpakas (SWE), Renaud Geller (BEL)

1 December 2009
20:00

Report

Aris BSA 2003 (Greece)	81–77	(Israel) Hapoel Jerusalem
Scoring by quarter: 25-22, 23-13, 16-18, 17-24
Pts: Dixon 20; Rebs: Kakiouzis 7 Asts: Dixon 5		Pts: Jeter 19; Rebs: Kokia, Thompson 5 Asts: Naimy 4

Alexandrio Melathron
Referees: Guerrino Cerebuch (ITA), Milija Vojinovic (SRB), Rüstü Nuran (TUR)

Game 3

8 December 2009
18:08

Report

Hapoel Jerusalem (Israel)	93–74	(Croatia) KK Zadar
Scoring by quarter: 20-16, 32-16, 21-18, 20-24
Pts: Thompson 20; Rebs: Kokia 12; Asts: Ohayon 7		Pts: Boisa 17; Rebs: Boisa 8 Asts: Car 4

Malha Arena
Attendance: 2,800
Referees: Romualdas Brazauskas (LTU), Sergey Mikhaylov (RUS), Arnis Ozols (LAT)

8 December 2009
18:15

Report

BC Šiauliai (Lithuania)	92–91	(Greece) Aris BSA 2003
Scoring by quarter: 28-22, 18-27, 18-28, 28-14
Pts: Šikšnius 25; Rebs: Kuzminskas 7 Asts: Žukauskas 5		Pts: Richardson 20; Rebs: Richardson 6 Asts: Miles 5

Šiaulių arena
Attendance: 4,100
Referees: Carl Jungebrand (FIN), Petri Mäntylä (FIN), Oskars Lucis (LAT)

Game 4

15 December 2009
19:00

Report

KK Zadar (Croatia)	86–69	(Israel) Hapoel Jerusalem
Scoring by quarter: 17-19, 21-11, 22-16, 26-23
Pts: Boisa 21; Rebs: Boisa 14; Asts: Rančić 6		Pts: Naimy 20; Rebs: Lyons 8 Asts: Jeter 3

Krešimir Ćosić Hall
Attendance: 3,000
Referees: Juan Carlos Arteaga (ESP), Panagiotis Anastopoulos (GRE), Aleksandar Milojevik (MKD)

15 December 2009
20:00

Report

Aris BSA 2003 (Greece)	85–67	(Lithuania) BC Šiauliai
Scoring by quarter: 15-20, 24-19, 15-14, 31-14
Pts: Kakiouzis 24; Rebs: Betts 13; Asts: Betts 4		Pts: Low 16; Rebs: Brown, Žukauskas 5 Asts: Low 4

Alexandrio Melathron
Attendance: 2,000
Referees: Zoran Šutulović (MNE), Andrej Jeršan (SLO), Omer Esteron (ISR)

Game 5

5 January 2009
18:15

Report

BC Šiauliai (Lithuania)	81–96	(Israel) Hapoel Jerusalem
Scoring by quarter: 17-18, 18-26, 16-25, 30-27
Pts: Low 22; Rebs: Sarakauskas 7 Asts: Žukauskas, Šikšnius, Low 4		Pts: Jeter 26; Rebs: Thompson 9 Asts: Hunter 5

Šiaulių arena
Attendance: 4,200
Referees: Borys Ryzhyk (UKR), Luis Lopes (POR), Roberto Chiari (ITA)

5 January 2009
20:00

Report

Aris BSA 2003 (Greece)	73–67	(Croatia) KK Zadar
Scoring by quarter: 19-20, 22-13, 21-15, 11-19
Pts: Miles 16; Rebs: Miles 7 Asts: Richardson 3		Pts: Perić 13; Rebs: Plaisted 11; Asts: Stipčević 3

Alexandrio Melathron
Attendance: 4,000
Referees: Juan Carlos García González (ESP), Robert Vyklicky (CZE), Nicolas Maestre (FRA)

Game 6

12 January 2009
19:00

Report

Hapoel Jerusalem (Israel)	79–89	(Greece) Aris BSA 2003
Scoring by quarter: 21-32, 19-16, 20-22, 19-19
Pts: Thompson 19; Rebs: Thompson 8 Asts: Simmons, Naimy, Jeter 3		Pts: Clark 22; Rebs: Miles 4 Asts: Clark 6

Malha Arena
Attendance: 2,800
Referees: Grzegorz Ziemblicki (POL), Boris Shulga (UKR), Petar Obradovic (BIH)

12 January 2009
19:00

Report

KK Zadar (Croatia)	110–87	(Lithuania) BC Šiauliai
Scoring by quarter: 30-26, 36-13, 19-24, 25-24
Pts: Rančić 25; Rebs: Downs 8 Asts: Stipčević 5		Pts: Šikšnius 20; Rebs: Brown, Orelik, Sarakauskas 4 Asts: Sarakauskas 6

Krešimir Ćosić Hall
Attendance: 1,500
Referees: Matej Boltauzer (SLO), Tolga Sahin (TUR), Laurentiu Grigoras (ROU)

== Group D ==
	Team	Pld	W	L	PF	PA	Diff
1.	(Russia) UNICS Kazan	6	5	1	498	421	+77
2.	(Spain) DKV Joventut	6	5	1	485	457	+28
3.	(Turkey) Beşiktaş Cola Turka	6	1	5	499	578	−79
4.	(Germany) Telekom Baskets Bonn	6	1	5	446	472	−26

Game 1

24 November 2009
17:00

Report

UNICS Kazan (Russia)	101–76	(Turkey) Beşiktaş Cola Turka
Scoring by quarter: 26-23, 23-10, 31-19, 21-24
Pts: Popović 36; Rebs: Lončar 11; Asts: Popović 5		Pts: Baxter, Chatman 19; Rebs: Chatman, Özer 6 Asts: Chatman 9

Basket-Hall Arena
Attendance: 2,000
Referees: Leonidas Spiridonos (GRE), Ademir Zurapović (BIH), Robert Vyklicky (CZE)

24 November 2009
20:00

Report

Telekom Baskets Bonn (Germany)	71–76	(Spain) DKV Joventut
Scoring by quarter: 23-20, 12-25, 17-15, 19-16
Pts: Taylor 20; Rebs: Ensminger 7 Asts: Strasser 4		Pts: Bogdanović, Tucker 16; Rebs: Tucker 6 Asts: Valters 6

Telekom Dome
Attendance: 4,020
Referees: Zoran Šutulović (MNE), Omer Esteron (ISR), Damir Javor (SLO)

Game 2

1 December 2009
18:00

Report

Beşiktaş Cola Turka (Turkey)	102–98 (OT)	(Germany) Telekom Baskets Bonn
Scoring by quarter: 19-25, 20-21, 24-23, 25-19, Overtime: 14-10
Pts: Chatman 35; Rebs: Özer 13; Asts: Chatman 8		Pts: Taylor 28; Rebs: Ensminger 16; Asts: Jordan 4

BJK Akatlar Arena
Attendance: 500
Referees: Juan Carlos Mitjana (ESP), Elias Koromilas (GRE), Francisco Arana (ESP)

1 December 2009
20:45

Report

DKV Joventut (Spain)	71–82	(Russia) UNICS Kazan
Scoring by quarter: 18-29, 14-14, 24-24, 15-15
Pts: Tucker 13; Rebs: Bogdanović, Koffi 6 Asts: Valters 14		Pts: Lončar 24; Rebs: Veremeenko 7 Asts: Popović, Samoylenko 6

Palau Municipal d'Esports de Badalona
Attendance: 4,055
Referees: Tolga Sahin(TUR), David Chambon (FRA), Joseph Bissang (FRA)

Game 3

8 December 2009
17:00

Report

UNICS Kazan (Russia)	76–64	(Germany) Telekom Baskets Bonn
Scoring by quarter: 25-14, 14-13, 19-16, 18-21
Pts: Popović 17; Rebs: Lončar 7 Asts: Popović 7		Pts: Ensminger 16; Rebs: Flomo 11; Asts: Strasser, Jordan 3

Basket-Hall Arena
Attendance: 3,000
Referees: Stamatis Mouzakis (GRE), Sergiy Zashchuck (UKR), Miroslav Tomov (BUL)

8 December 2009
17:00

Report

Beşiktaş Cola Turka (Turkey)	73–86	(Spain) DKV Joventut
Scoring by quarter: 15-26, 17-24, 17-21, 24-15
Pts: Chatman 20; Rebs: Fletcher 6 Asts: Yıldırım, Özkan 3		Pts: Tucker 21; Rebs: Tomàs 6 Asts: Bogdanović, Tucker, Fernández 3

BJK Akatlar Arena
Attendance: 200
Referees: Shmuel Bachar (ISR), Marius Ciulin (ROU), Yaron Zarif (ISR)

Game 4

15 December 2009
20:00

Report

Telekom Baskets Bonn (Germany)	62–66	(Russia) UNICS Kazan
Scoring by quarter: 15-24, 23-14, 12-15, 12-13
Pts: Taylor 18; Rebs: Ensminger, Dupree 8 Asts: Jordan 5		Pts: Popović 19; Rebs: Zamanski, Lončar 7 Asts: Popović 4

Telekom Dome
Attendance: 3,925
Referees: Fabio Facchini (ITA), Marko Juras (SRB), Marcin Kowalski (POL)

15 December 2009
20:45

Report

DKV Joventut (Spain)	108–92	(Turkey) Beşiktaş Cola Turka
Scoring by quarter: 27-19, 30-22, 29-23, 22-28
Pts: Tripković 20; Rebs: Bueno 6 Asts: Valters 6		Pts: Atsür, Fletcher 21; Rebs: Chatman 9 Asts: Yıldırım 5

Palau Municipal d'Esports de Badalona
Attendance: 3,637
Referees: Jakub Zamojski (POL), Boris Shulga (UKR), Nikola Lepetic (SRB)

Game 5

5 January 2009
18:00

Report

Beşiktaş Cola Turka (Turkey)	70–98	(Russia) UNICS Kazan
Scoring by quarter: 9-24, 21-28, 17-22, 23-24
Pts: Özer 16; Rebs: Fletcher 6 Asts: Güler, Atsür 4		Pts: Popović 18; Rebs: Veremeenko, Yurchyk 7 Asts: Popović 4

BJK Akatlar Arena
Attendance: 110
Referees: Sreten Radović (CRO), Spiros Gkontas (GRE), Laurentiu Grigoras (ROU)

5 January 2009
21:00

Report

DKV Joventut (Spain)	66–64	(Germany) Telekom Baskets Bonn
Scoring by quarter: 14-13, 18-13, 13-17, 21-21
Pts: Tucker 13; Rebs: Norel 8 Asts: Valters, Tucker 4		Pts: Taylor 19; Rebs: Flomo 5 Asts: Jordan 4

Palau Municipal d'Esports de Badalona
Attendance: 2,809
Referees: Gianpaolo Cicoria (ITA), Renaud Geller (BEL), Jasmina Juras (SRB)

Game 6

12 January 2009
19:00

Report

UNICS Kazan (Russia)	75–78	(Spain) DKV Joventut
Scoring by quarter: 23-18, 15-19, 19-24, 18-17
Pts: Lyday 27; Rebs: Lyday 7 Asts: Samoylenko 4		Pts: Bogdanović 16; Rebs: Koffi 7 Asts: Tucker 6

Basket-Hall Arena
Attendance: 1,500
Referees: Volodymr Drabikovsky (UKR), Damir Javor (SLO), Rüstü Nuran (TUR)

12 January 2009
19:00

Report

Telekom Baskets Bonn (Germany)	87–86	(Turkey) Beşiktaş Cola Turka
Scoring by quarter: 21-24, 15-27, 23-22, 28-13
Pts: Ensminger 18; Rebs: Ensminger 13; Asts: Jordan 6		Pts: Atsür, Newley 17; Rebs: Güler 7 Asts: Atsür 7

Telekom Dome
Attendance: 3,570
Referees: Milivoje Jovčić (SRB), Andrej Lovsyn (SLO), Regis Bardera (FRA)

== Group E ==
	Team	Pld	W	L	PF	PA	Diff	Tie-break
1.	(Spain) Bizkaia Bilbao Basket	6	6	0	510	432	+78	
2.	(Turkey) Türk Telekom	6	3	3	479	452	+27	1–1, +11
3.	(Russia) Spartak Saint Petersburg	6	3	3	456	462	−6	1–1, –11
4.	(Belgium) Spirou Basket	6	0	6	384	483	−99	

Game 1

24 November 2009
18:00

Report

Spartak Saint Petersburg (Russia)	85–83	(Turkey) Türk Telekom
Scoring by quarter: 22-19, 22-27, 19-22, 22-15
Pts: White 20; Rebs: Suton 5 Asts: Fields 8		Pts: Wilson 22; Rebs: Dudley 10; Asts: Mallet 7

Yubileyny Sports Palace
Attendance: 2,000
Referees: Borys Ryzhyk (UKR), Petri Mäntylä (FIN), Jurgis Laurinavicius (LTU)

24 November 2009
20:15

Report

Spirou Basket (Belgium)	67–80	(Spain) Bizkaia Bilbao Basket
Scoring by quarter: 17-19, 18-20, 14-20, 18-21
Pts: Tabu 22; Rebs: Wilkinson 7 Asts: Tabu 7		Pts: Banić 17; Rebs: four players with 5 Asts: Salgado 6

Spiroudome
Attendance: 5,000
Referees: Andrej Lovsyn (SLO), Enrico Sabetta (ITA), Joseph Bissang (FRA)

Game 2

1 December 2009
18:15

Report

Türk Telekom (Turkey)	91–67	(Belgium) Spirou Basket
Scoring by quarter: 24-6, 24-18, 27-25, 16-18
Pts: Wilson 25; Rebs: Beşok 7 Asts: Owens, Sentürk, Dudley 3		Pts: Broyles 19; Rebs: Broyles 7 Asts: Broyles 4

Ankara Atatürk Sport Hall
Referees: Andrej Jeršan (SLO), Roman Kolar (SLO), Zdravko Rutešić (MNE)

1 December 2009
20:00

Report

Bizkaia Bilbao Basket (Spain)	85–62	(Russia) Spartak Saint Petersburg
Scoring by quarter: 22-15, 19-12, 24-12, 20-23
Pts: Banić 18; Rebs: Markota 6 Asts: Moïso, Rodríguez 3		Pts: White 17; Rebs: White 7 Asts: Pashutin 3

Bizkaia Arena
Attendance: 8,000
Referees: Shmuel Bachar (ISR), Luis Lopes (POR), Nicolas Maestre (FRA)

Game 3

8 December 2009
18:00

Report

Spartak Saint Petersburg (Russia)	80–69	(Belgium) Spirou Basket
Scoring by quarter: 26-17, 15-14, 28-23, 11-15
Pts: Raković 17; Rebs: Suton 11; Asts: Fields 6		Pts: Broyles 26; Rebs: Broyles 10; Asts: Broyles 4

Yubileyny Sports Palace
Attendance: 2,000
Referees: Saša Pukl (SLO), Boris Shulga (UKR), Lahdo Sharro (SWE)

8 December 2009
18:15

Report

Türk Telekom (Turkey)	70–85	(Spain) Bizkaia Bilbao Basket
Scoring by quarter: 28-19, 16-22, 14-24, 12-20
Pts: Erdoğan 16; Rebs: Dudley 5 Asts: Açık 6		Pts: Banić 26; Rebs: Moïso 8 Asts: Blūms 4

Ankara Atatürk Sport Hall
Attendance: 1,900
Referees: Dubravko Muhvic (CRO), Andrej Jeršan (SLO), Nikola Lepetic (SRB)

Game 4

15 December 2009
20:00

Report

Bizkaia Bilbao Basket (Spain)	81–75	(Turkey) Türk Telekom
Scoring by quarter: 28-16, 18-22, 22-17, 13-20
Pts: Markota 27; Rebs: Markota, Blūms 7 Asts: Conley 4		Pts: Wilson 19; Rebs: Dudley 8 Asts: Açık 5

Bizkaia Arena
Attendance: 6,500
Referees: Romualdas Brazauskas (LTU), Radomir Vojinovic (MNE), Renaud Geller (BEL)

15 December 2009
20:15

Report

Spirou Basket (Belgium)	50–68	(Russia) Spartak Saint Petersburg
Scoring by quarter: 15-16, 11-20, 11-22, 13-10
Pts: Hamilton, Jacobson 10; Rebs: Riddick, Massot 7 Asts: Tabu 3		Pts: White 20; Rebs: Raković 14; Asts: Meshcharakou 3

Spiroudome
Attendance: 5,000
Referees: Dani Hierrezuelo (ESP), Robert Lottermoser (GER), Jasmina Juras (SRB)

Game 5

5 January 2009
18:15

Report

Türk Telekom (Turkey)	86–73	(Russia) Spartak Saint Petersburg
Scoring by quarter: 20-18, 23-15, 19-16, 24-24
Pts: Dudley 20; Rebs: Dudley 10; Asts: Açık 6		Pts: Raković 25; Rebs: Raković 8 Asts: Fields 8

Ankara Atatürk Sport Hall
Attendance: 1,748
Referees: Fabio Facchini (ITA), Seffi Shemmesh (ISR), Marcin Kowalski (POL)

5 January 2009
20:15

Report

Bizkaia Bilbao Basket (Spain)	90–70	(Belgium) Spirou Basket
Scoring by quarter: 20-24, 30-15, 26-15, 14-16
Pts: Banić 14; Rebs: Markota 6 Asts: Blūms 4		Pts: Wilkinson 23; Rebs: Riddick, Wilkinson 6 Asts: Johnson 3

Bizkaia Arena
Attendance: 6,518
Referees: Volodymr Drabikovsky(UKR), Apostolos Kalpakas (SWE), Jurgis Laurinavicius (LTU)

Game 6

12 January 2009
19:30

Report

Spartak Saint Petersburg (Russia)	88–89 (OT)	(Spain) Bizkaia Bilbao Basket
Scoring by quarter: 18-21, 16-20, 21-18, 23-19, Overtime: 10-11
Pts: Fields 19; Rebs: Meshcharakou 6 Asts: Meshcharakou 6		Pts: Mumbrú 26; Rebs: Warren 6 Asts: Rodríguez 5

Yubileyny Sports Palace
Attendance: 1,700
Referees: Luigi Lamonica (ITA), Sergiy Zashchuck (UKR), Panagiotis Anastopoulos (GRE)

12 January 2009
19:30

Report

Spirou Basket (Belgium)	61–74	(Turkey) Türk Telekom
Scoring by quarter: 13-24, 10-18, 21-16, 17-16
Pts: Tabu 18; Rebs: Wilkinson 8 Asts: Massot 6		Pts: Mallet 24; Rebs: Dudley 9 Asts: Sentürk, Mallet 4

Spiroudome
Attendance: 5,000
Referees: Gianpaolo Cicoria (ITA), Nicolas Maestre (FRA), Joseph Bissang (FRA)

== Group F ==
	Team	Pld	W	L	PF	PA	Diff
1.	(Serbia) Crvena zvezda	6	5	1	498	452	+46
2.	(Italy) Benetton Basket	6	4	2	494	475	+19
3.	(France) Cholet Basket	6	3	3	442	438	+4
4.	(Russia) Dynamo Moscow	6	0	6	430	499	−69

Game 1

24 November 2009
18:00

Report

Crvena zvezda (Serbia)	76–67	(Russia) Dynamo Moscow
Scoring by quarter: 13-23, 24-16, 17-11, 22-17
Pts: Dragićević 17; Rebs: Bjelica 9 Asts: Videnov 5		Pts: Bykov 18; Rebs: Monia 8 Asts: Khvostov 5

Pionir Hall
Attendance: 4,500
Referees: Shmuel Bachar (ISR), Roman Kolar (SLO), Yaron Zarif (ISR)

24 November 2009
20:30

Report

Cholet Basket (France)	70–71	(Italy) Benetton Basket
Scoring by quarter: 16-23, 17-16, 23-18, 14-14
Pts: Mejia 29; Rebs: Falker 10; Asts: Falker 4		Pts: Neal 19; Rebs: Wallace 6 Asts: Neal 4

La Meilleraie
Attendance: 4,017
Referees: Dani Hierrezuelo (ESP), Miguel Angel Perez Niz (ESP), Luis Lopes (POR)

Game 2

1 December 2009
17:30

Report

Dynamo Moscow (Russia)	64–72	(France) Cholet Basket
Scoring by quarter: 21-12, 10-16, 19-16, 14-28
Pts: Bykov 20; Rebs: Monia 9 Asts: Bykov 5		Pts: Eitutavicius 20; Rebs: Robinson 7 Asts: Mejia 5

Krylatskoe Sport Palace
Attendance: 1,500
Referees: Saša Pukl (SLO), Carmelo Paternico (ITA), Oskars Lucis (LAT)

1 December 2009
20:45

Report

Benetton Basket (Italy)	71–78	(Serbia) Crvena zvezda
Scoring by quarter: 14-23, 24-17, 20-17, 13-21
Pts: Neal 22; Rebs: Wallace 9 Asts: Kus 3		Pts: Kikanović 21; Rebs: Radivojević, Bjelica 7 Asts: Radivojević 8

Palaverde
Attendance: 3,050
Referees: Jose Ramon Garcia Ortiz (ESP), Antonio Conde (ESP), Panagiotis Anastopoulos (GRE)

Game 3

8 December 2009
17:30

Report

Dynamo Moscow (Russia)	74–86	(Italy) Benetton Basket
Scoring by quarter: 17-29, 22-20, 20-14, 15-23
Pts: Bykov 22; Rebs: Shved 8 Asts: Domani 4		Pts: Wallace 21; Rebs: Neal 8 Asts: Kus 6

Krylatskoe Sport Palace
Attendance: 1,700
Referees: Zoran Šutulović (MNE), Andrej Lovsyn (SLO), Rüstü Nuran(TUR)

8 December 2009
18:00

Report

Crvena zvezda (Serbia)	82–66	(France) Cholet Basket
Scoring by quarter: 22-25, 13-13, 26-14, 21-14
Pts: Dragićević, Štimac 18; Rebs: Štimac 7 Asts: Radivojević 4		Pts: Causeur 14; Rebs: Falker 12; Asts: Causeur 2

Pionir Hall
Attendance: 3,500
Referees: Vicente Bulto (ESP), Oliver Krause (GER), Omer Esteron (ISR)

Game 4

15 December 2009
20:30

Report

Cholet Basket (France)	79–70	(Serbia) Crvena zvezda
Scoring by quarter: 20-15, 19-20, 20-14, 20-21
Pts: Mejia 35; Rebs: Seraphin, Robinson 10; Asts: Eitutavicius 6		Pts: Kikanović 22; Rebs: Bjelica 6 Asts: Radivojević 5

La Meilleraie
Attendance: 4,634
Referees: Tolga Sahin(TUR), Arnis Ozols (LAT), Francisco Arana (ESP)

15 December 2009
20:45

Report

Benetton Basket (Italy)	102–69	(Russia) Dynamo Moscow
Scoring by quarter: 25-19, 21-19, 29-16, 27-15
Pts: Neal 23; Rebs: Wallace 7 Asts: Hackett 6		Pts: Bykov 17; Rebs: Zhukanenko 13; Asts: four players with 2

Palaverde
Attendance: 3,116
Referees: Elias Koromilas (GRE), Spiros Gontas (GRE), Milivoje Jovčić (SRB)

Game 5

5 January 2009
15:00

Report

Dynamo Moscow (Russia)	86–88	(Serbia) Crvena zvezda
Scoring by quarter: 25-19, 22-27, 22-21, 17-21
Pts: Bykov 17; Rebs: Savrasenko 9 Asts: Khvostov, Bykov 4		Pts: Taylor 22; Rebs: Bjelica 11; Asts: Taylor 4

Krylatskoe Sport Palace
Attendance: 1,500
Referees: Costas Mouzakis (GRE), Miroslav Tomov (BUL), Marius Ciulin (ROU)

5 January 2009
20:45

Report

Benetton Basket (Italy)	81–80 (OT)	(France) Cholet Basket
Scoring by quarter: 19-14, 10-21, 18-23, 24-13, Overtime: 10-9
Pts: Nicević 28; Rebs: Wallace 11; Asts: Kus 4		Pts: Mejia 26; Rebs: Falker 12; Asts: Mejia 3

Palaverde
Attendance: 2,816
Referees: José Martín (ESP), Nikola Lepetic (SRB), Dragan Nešković (SRB)

Game 6

12 January 2009
19:30

Report

Cholet Basket (France)	75–70	(Russia) Dynamo Moscow
Scoring by quarter: 21-12, 19-23, 13-18, 22-17
Pts: Mejia 25; Rebs: Mejia 7 Asts: Robinson 4		Pts: Bykov 23; Rebs: Zhukanenko 8 Asts: Shved 6

La Meilleraie
Attendance: 3,500
Referees: Siniša Herceg (CRO), Renaud Geller (BEL), Aleksandar Milojevik (MKD)

12 January 2009
19:30

Report

Crvena zvezda (Serbia)	104–83	(Italy) Benetton Basket
Scoring by quarter: 23-29, 28-20, 23-17, 30-17
Pts: Taylor 24; Rebs: Kešelj 7 Asts: Radivojević 5		Pts: Neal 20; Rebs: Wallace 7 Asts: Rivers 5

Pionir Hall
Attendance: 5,000
Referees: Recep Ankarali (TUR), Tomas Jasevicius (LTU), Seffi Shemmesh (ISR)

== Group G ==
	Team	Pld	W	L	PF	PA	Diff
1.	(Greece) Panellinios BC	6	4	2	457	415	+42
2.	(Spain) Gran Canaria 2014	6	4	2	425	416	+9
3.	(France) SLUC Nancy	6	3	3	445	444	+1
4.	(Poland) PGE Turów Zgorzelec	6	1	5	444	496	−52

Game 1

24 November 2009
18:30

Report

PGE Turów Zgorzelec (Poland)	72–75	(France) SLUC Nancy
Scoring by quarter: 22-15, 10-20, 21-21, 19-19
Pts: Wright 26; Rebs: Witka 8 Asts: Deane, Gray, Chilinsky 2		Pts: Dickens 18; Rebs: R. Greer 8 Asts: R. Greer 8

Hala Orbita
Attendance: 2,000
Referees: Sreten Radović (CRO), Vicente Bulto (ESP), Zdravko Rutešić (MNE)

24 November 2009
20:00

Report

Panellinios BC (Greece)	89–60	(Spain) Gran Canaria 2014
Scoring by quarter: 24-14, 24-12, 18-21, 23-13
Pts: Smith 25; Rebs: Johnsen 8 Asts: Papamakarios 5		Pts: Moran, Carroll 11; Rebs: Augustine 8 Asts: Bellas 5

Peristeri Arena
Attendance: 200
Referees: Luigi Lamonica (ITA), Marko Juras (SRB), Lahdo Sharro (SWE)

Game 2

1 December 2009
20:00

Report

SLUC Nancy (France)	72–81 (OT)	(Greece) Panellinios BC
Scoring by quarter: 24-24, 10-16, 9-8, 22-17, Overtime: 7-16
Pts: J. Greer 15; Rebs: Slaughter, R. Greer 9 Asts: R. Greer 7		Pts: Smith 21; Rebs: Haralabidis 6 Asts: Blakney 7

Palais des Sports Jean Weille
Attendance: 3,652
Referees: Juan Carlos Garcia Gonzalez (ESP), Robert Lottermoser (GER), Anna Cardus (ESP)

1 December 2009
21:30

Report

Gran Canaria 2014 (Spain)	85–74	(Poland) PGE Turów Zgorzelec
Scoring by quarter: 18-17, 17-15, 26-20, 24-22
Pts: Carroll 18; Rebs: Augustine, Moran, Carroll 7 Asts: Bellas, Moran 5		Pts: Wright 25; Rebs: Wright 6 Asts: Deane 6

Centro Insular de Deportes
Attendance: 4,000
Referees: Zoran Šutulović (MNE), Borys Ryzhyk (UKR), Olegs Latisevs (LAT)

Game 3

8 December 2009
19:00

Report

Gran Canaria 2014 (Spain)	77–65	(France) SLUC Nancy
Scoring by quarter: 24-15, 14-18, 19-14, 20-18
Pts: McDonald 19; Rebs: Augustine 13; Asts: Norris 6		Pts: Cox 16; Rebs: Slaughter 16; Asts: R. Greer 3

Centro Insular de Deportes
Attendance: 3,228
Referees: Paolo Taurino (ITA), Carmelo Paternico (ITA), Renaud Geller (BEL)

8 December 2009
20:00

Report

Panellinios BC (Greece)	83–65	(Poland) PGE Turów Zgorzelec
Scoring by quarter: 20-15, 25-12, 15-22, 23-16
Pts: Papamakarios, Johnsen 16; Rebs: Blakney, Kolokas 4 Asts: Blakney 7		Pts: Gray, Wysocki 18; Rebs: Wright, Wysocki 6 Asts: Deane, Gray, Chilinsky 3

Peristeri Arena
Attendance: 2,000
Referees: Fabio Facchini (ITA), Seffi Shemmesh (ISR), Aleksandar Milojevik (MKD)

Game 4

15 December 2009
18:30

Report

PGE Turów Zgorzelec (Poland)	81–76	(Greece) Panellinios BC
Scoring by quarter: 26-20, 23-19, 12-17, 20-20
Pts: Wysocki 22; Rebs: Wright 8 Asts: Gray 11		Pts: Haralabidis 30; Rebs: Haralabidis, Smith; Asts: Blakney 4

Hala Orbita
Attendance: 2,100
Referees: Ilija Belošević (SRB), Sergey Mikhaylov (RUS), Sergiy Chebyshev (UKR)

15 December 2009
20:00

Report

SLUC Nancy (France)	67–55	(Spain) Gran Canaria 2014
Scoring by quarter: 10-14, 16-13, 21-14, 20-14
Pts: Greer 16; Rebs: Slaughter 12; Asts: Greer 6		Pts: Norris 14; Rebs: Augustine 6 Asts: Fisher 5

Palais des Sports Jean Weille
Attendance: 4,650
Referees: Marek Ćmikiewicz (POL), Luis Lopes (POR), Dragan Nešković (SRB)

Game 5

5 January 2009
19:00

Report

Gran Canaria 2014 (Spain)	73–51	(Greece) Panellinios BC
Scoring by quarter: 10-13, 19-12, 22-15, 22-11
Pts: Augustine 19; Rebs: Augustine 9 Asts: Norris 5		Pts: Smith 18; Rebs: Vouyoukas 8 Asts: Xanthopoulos, Smith 2

Centro Insular de Deportes
Attendance: 3,127
Referees: Romualdas Brazauskas (LTU), Petri Mäntylä (FIN), Arnis Ozols (LAT)

5 January 2009
20:00

Report

SLUC Nancy (France)	102–82	(Poland) PGE Turów Zgorzelec
Scoring by quarter: 18-22, 22-24, 30-22, 32-14
Pts: Greer 22; Rebs: Greer 8 Asts: Tchicamboud, Greer 5		Pts: Wright 22; Rebs: Gray 5 Asts: Thompson 8

Palais des Sports Jean Weille
Attendance: 4,035
Referees: Tolga Sahin(TUR), Sasa Maricic (SRB), Oscar Perea (ESP)

Game 6

12 January 2009
19:30

Report

PGE Turów Zgorzelec (Poland)	70–75	(Spain) Gran Canaria 2014
Scoring by quarter: 22-21, 23-25, 14-17, 11-12
Pts: Wright 16; Rebs: Witka 6 Asts: Gray 4		Pts: Carroll 15; Rebs: Augustine 9 Asts: Savané, Norris, McDonald 3

Hala Orbita
Attendance: 1,300
Referees: Borys Ryzhyk (UKR), Radomir Vojinovic (MNE), Marius Ciulin (ROU)

12 January 2009
19:30

Report

Panellinios BC (Greece)	77–64	(France) SLUC Nancy
Scoring by quarter: 18-14, 17-20, 13-16, 29-14
Pts: Davis 28; Rebs: Davis 5 Asts: Vougioukas 4		Pts: Brun 14; Rebs: Slaughter 9 Asts: four players with 2

Peristeri Arena
Attendance: 300
Referees: Juan Carlos Mitjana (ESP), Antonio Conde (ESP), Miroslav Tomov (BUL)

== Group H ==
	Team	Pld	W	L	PF	PA	Diff	Tie-break
1.	(Czech Republic) ČEZ Nymburk	6	4	2	469	405	+64	2–2, +16
2.	(Germany) Brose Baskets	6	4	2	495	422	+73	2–2, +1
3.	(Italy) Lauretana Biella	6	4	2	460	437	+23	2–2, –17
4.	(Latvia) BK Ventspils	6	0	6	346	506	−160	

Game 1

24 November 2009
18:30

Report

BK Ventspils (Latvia)	62–85	(Germany) Brose Baskets
Scoring by quarter: 20-28, 13-17, 12-30, 17-10
Pts: Strēlnieks 16; Rebs: Pettway 11; Asts: Strēlnieks 8		Pts: Suput 18; Rebs: Pleiss 9 Asts: Jacobsen, Garrett 3

Ventspils Olympic Center
Attendance: 2,000
Referees: Jakub Zamojski (POL), Boris Shulga (UKR), Renaud Geller (BEL)

24 November 2009
20:30

Report

Lauretana Biella (Italy)	78–77	(Czech Republic) ČEZ Nymburk
Scoring by quarter: 21-14, 22-17, 12-19, 23-17
Pts: Aradori 18; Rebs: Pasco 9 Asts: Smith 6		Pts: Benda, Kremen, Hanavan 11; Rebs: Sokolovsky, Kremen 4 Asts: Hanavan 4

Biella Forum
Attendance: 2,621
Referees: Dubravko Muhvic (CRO), Nicolas Maestre (FRA), Jasmina Tatic (SRB)

Game 2

1 December 2009
18:00

Report

ČEZ Nymburk (Czech Republic)	79–57	(Latvia) BK Ventspils
Scoring by quarter: 21-14, 21-20, 15-7, 22-16
Pts: Lewis 23; Rebs: Sokolovský, Lee 4 Asts: Lee 8		Pts: Pettway 21; Rebs: Pettway, Jurevičus 6 Asts: Strēlnieks 4

ČEZ Arena, Pardubice
Attendance: 4,672
Referees: Ilija Belošević (SRB), Regis Bardera (FRA), Laurentiu Grigoras (ROU)

2 December 2009
20:00

Report

Brose Baskets (Germany)	87–85	(Italy) Lauretana Biella
Scoring by quarter: 22-12, 23-26, 23-14, 19-33
Pts: Roberts 16; Rebs: Jacobsen 5 Asts: Suput 6		Pts: Aradori 19; Rebs: Schultze, Garri 5 Asts: Coleman 3

Jako Arena
Attendance: 6,264
Referees: Lazaros Voreadis (GRE), Marius Ciulin (ROU), Omer Esteron (ISR)

Game 3

8 December 2009
18:00

Report

ČEZ Nymburk (Czech Republic)	71–66	(Germany) Brose Baskets
Scoring by quarter: 14-21, 18-20, 21-18, 18-7
Pts: Benda, Ricci 12; Rebs: Benda 6 Asts: Hanavan 4		Pts: Šuput, Wyrick 10; Rebs: Pleiss, Wyrick 5 Asts: Šuput, Tadda 3

ČEZ Arena, Pardubice
Attendance: 5,248
Referees: José Martín (ESP), Joseph Bissang (FRA), Oscar Perea (ESP)

8 December 2009
18:15

Report

Lauretana Biella (Italy)	80–54	(Latvia) BK Ventspils
Scoring by quarter: 22-9, 24-12, 13-21, 21-12
Pts: Smith, Pasco 15; Rebs: Pasco 9 Asts: Smith 4		Pts: Strēlnieks 14; Rebs: Zaķis 9 Asts: Bertāns 4

Biella Forum
Attendance: 2,278
Referees: Siniša Herceg (CRO), Petar Obradovic(BIH), Miguel Angel Perez Niz (ESP)

Game 4

15 December 2009
18:30

Report

BK Ventspils (Latvia)	63–77	(Italy) Lauretana Biella
Scoring by quarter: 13-20, 15-22, 14-21, 21-14
Pts: Strēlnieks 14; Rebs: Pettway 7 Asts: Buškevics 4		Pts: Coleman 17; Rebs: Pasco 9 Asts: Smith 6

Ventspils Olympic Center
Attendance: 2,000
Referees: Borys Ryzhyk (UKR), Petri Mäntylä (FIN), Jurgis Laurinavicius (LTU)

15 December 2009
20:00

Report

Brose Baskets (Germany)	85–73	(Czech Republic) ČEZ Nymburk
Scoring by quarter: 22-22, 19-17, 26-12, 18-22
Pts: Brown 16; Rebs: Pleiss 9 Asts: Šuput 4		Pts: Lee 17; Rebs: Ricci 7 Asts: Lee 3

Jako Arena
Attendance: 6,368
Referees: Grzegorz Ziemblicki(POL), Petar Obradovic(BIH), Miroslav Tomov (BUL)

Game 5

5 January 2009
18:00

Report

ČEZ Nymburk (Czech Republic)	84–60	(Italy) Lauretana Biella
Scoring by quarter: 15-12, 17-11, 26-15, 26-22
Pts: Lee 20; Rebs: Benda, Lenzly 6 Asts: Sokolovsky, Lewis 3		Pts: Smith 20; Rebs: Pasco 6 Asts: Smith 3

ČEZ Arena, Pardubice
Attendance: 4,862
Referees: Robert Lottermoser (GER), Milija Vojinovic (SRB), Sergey Mikhaylov (RUS)

5 January 2009
20:00

Report

Brose Baskets (Germany)	100–51	(Latvia) BK Ventspils
Scoring by quarter: 33-11, 19-11, 26-13, 22-16
Pts: Wyrick 16; Rebs: Pleiss, Roberts 5 Asts: Goldsberry 6		Pts: Bertāns 21; Rebs: Pettway, Strēlnieks 6 Asts: Strēlnieks, Buškevics, Bertāns 1

Jako Arena
Attendance: 6,800
Referees: Andrej Jeršan (SLO), Andrej Lovsyn (SLO), Aleksandar Milojevik (MKD)

Game 6

12 January 2009
19:30

Report

BK Ventspils (Latvia)	59–85	(Czech Republic) ČEZ Nymburk
Scoring by quarter: 13-27, 11-19, 22-20, 13-19
Pts: Kalve, Bertāns 14; Rebs: Blaus, Zaķis 5 Asts: Buškevics 6		Pts: Lewis 22; Rebs: Benda, Ricci 5 Asts: Lee 4

Ventspils Olympic Center
Attendance: 1,800
Referees: Dragan Nešković (SRB), Sergiy Chebyshev (UKR), Lahdo Sharro (SWE)

12 January 2009
19:30

Report

Lauretana Biella (Italy)	80–72	(Germany) Brose Baskets
Scoring by quarter: 17-17, 25-15, 14-21, 24-19
Pts: Aradori 19; Rebs: Ona Embo, Garri 6 Asts: Ona Embo 3		Pts: Šuput 21; Rebs: Brown 8 Asts: Goldsberry 4

Biella Forum
Attendance: 3,486
Referees: Dubravko Muhvic (CRO), Ademir Zurapović (SRB), Zdravko Rutešić (MNE)
