= Eurocup Basketball 2009–10 qualifying round =

Eurocup Basketball 2009–10 qualifying round was the qualifying round for the 2009-10 Eurocup season. There were 16 teams that played two games each. The winners went on to the group stage.

== Bracket ==
Team #1	Agg.	Team #2	1st leg	2nd leg
MyGuide Amsterdam (Netherlands)	112-141	(Russia) Dynamo Moscow	64 - 63	48-78
Dexia Mons-Hainaut (Belgium)	139-142	(Spain) Valencia Basket	78 - 63	61-79
WBC Kraftwerk Wels (Austria)	155-169	(Turkey) Beşiktaş Cola Turka	74 - 69	81-100
BK VEF Rīga (Latvia)	158-168	(Greece) Panellinios	79 - 94	79-74
Brose Baskets Bamberg (Germany)	129-128	(Montenegro) KK Budućnost	64 - 61	65-67
BC Donetsk (Ukraine)	150-153	(Spain) Bizkaia Bilbao Basket	71 - 63	79-90
APOEL Nicosia (Cyprus)	149-150	(Italy) BancaTercas Teramo	77 - 63	62-77
Chorale Roanne Basket (France)	162-169	(Israel) Hapoel Jerusalem	83 - 81	79-88

== First leg ==
October 20, 2009

Report

(Netherlands) MyGuide Amsterdam	64–63	(Russia) Dynamo Moscow
Pts: Rodgers, Voorn 17; Rebs: Krabbendam 8 Asts: Rodgers 6		Pts: Monia 13; Rebs: Monia 8 Asts: Bykov 4

Sporthallen Zuid, Amsterdam

October 20, 2009

Report

(Belgium) Dexia Mons-Hainaut	78–63	(Spain) Valencia Basket
Pts: Torbert 25; Rebs: Ebong 12; Asts: Torbert 6		Pts: de Colo 21; Rebs: de Colo 7 Asts: Martínez 5

Mons.Arena, Jemappes
Attendance: 3210

October 20, 2009

Report

(Austria) WBC Kraftwerk Wels	74–69	(Turkey) Beşiktaş Cola Turka
Pts: Conley 25; Rebs: Conley 16; Asts: Moore 6		Pts: Özer 20; Rebs: Chatman, Baxter 7 Asts: Chatman 4

Raiffeisen Arena, Wels

October 19, 2009

Report

(Latvia) BK VEF Rīga	79–94	(Greece) Panellinios
Pts: Aleksejevs 21; Rebs: Aleksejevs 6 Asts: Labuckas 6		Pts: Smith 25; Rebs: Johnsen 8 Asts: Xanthopoulos 7

Riga Arena, Riga
Attendance: 2100

October 20, 2009

Report

(Ukraine) BC Donetsk	71–63	(Spain) Bizkaia Bilbao Basket
Pts: Perry 18; Rebs: Drozdov 8 Asts: Tucker 5		Pts: Blūms 12; Rebs: Mumbrú 6 Asts: four players 1

Druzhba Palace of Sports, Donetsk
Attendance: 4572

October 20, 2009

Report

(Cyprus) APOEL Nicosia	77–63	(Italy) BancaTercas Teramo
Pts: Heath 22; Rebs: Phillips 8 Asts: Heath 6		Pts: Diener 16; Rebs: Diener 7 Asts: three players 2

Eleftheria Indoor Hall, Nicosia
Attendance: 250

October 20, 2009

Report

(France) Chorale Roanne Basket	83–81	(Israel) Hapoel Jerusalem
Pts: Noel 26; Rebs: Nsonwu 10; Asts: Diabate 9		Pts: Simmons 20; Rebs: Pinkney 9 Asts: Thompson, Simmons 5

Halle André Vacheresse, Roanne
Attendance: 2900

October 21, 2009

Report

(Germany) Brose Baskets	64–61	(Montenegro) KK Budućnost
Pts: Brown 20; Rebs: Brown, Jacobsen 6 Asts: three players 2		Pts: Dragičević 23; Rebs: Dragičević 8 Asts: Šehović 5

Jako Arena, Bamberg
Attendance: 6400

== Second leg ==
Makedonia TV

October 27, 2009

Report

(Greece) Panellinios	74–79	(Latvia) BK VEF Rīga
Pts: Johnsen 22; Rebs: Smith 8 Asts: Haralabidis 3		Pts: Renfroe, Bankevics 23; Rebs: Šeļakovs 6 Asts: Mažeika 6

Panellinios Indoor Hall, Athens
Attendance: 450

Panellinios won by an aggregate score of 168-158 and advanced to the group stage.

October 27, 2009

Report

(Turkey) Beşiktaş Cola Turka	100–81	(Austria) WBC Kraftwerk Wels
Pts: Chatman 34; Rebs: Chatman 8 Asts: Chatman 9		Pts: Conley 24; Rebs: Lamesic 11; Asts: Conley, Meacham 5

BJK Akatlar Arena, Istanbul
Attendance: 500

Beşiktaş Cola Turka won by an aggregate score of 169-155 and advanced to the group stage.

October 27, 2009

Report

(Spain) Valencia Basket	79–61	(Belgium) Dexia Mons-Hainaut
Pts: Martínez 18; Rebs: Claver 8 Asts: Claver, Nielsen 3		Pts: Coleman 12; Rebs: three players 5 Asts: Costner 2

Pabellon Municipal Fuente San Luis, Valencia
Attendance: 8500

Valencia Basket won by an aggregate score of 142-139 and advanced to the group stage.

October 27, 2009

Report

(Russia) Dynamo Moscow	78–48	(Netherlands) MyGuide Amsterdam
Pts: four players 15; Rebs: Monia 10; Asts: Monia, Khvostov 4		Pts: Rodgers, Voorn 17; Rebs: Krabbendam 8 Asts: Rodgers 6

Krylatskoe Sport Palace, Moscow
Attendance: 1500

Dynamo Moscow won by an aggregate score of 141-112 and advanced to the group stage.

October 27, 2009

Report

(Italy) BancaTercas Teramo	77–62	(Cyprus) APOEL Nicosia
Pts: Jones 16; Rebs: Jurak 7 Asts: Hoover 6		Pts: Sims 28; Rebs: Cisse 12; Asts: King 2

PalaScapriano, Teramo

BancaTercas Teramo won by an aggregate score of 150-149 and advanced to the group stage.

October 28, 2009

Report

(Israel) Hapoel Jerusalem	88–79	(France) Chorale Roanne Basket
Pts: Simmons 22; Rebs: Hunter 6 Asts: Ohayon 6		Pts: Nsonwu 21; Rebs: Page 8 Asts: Pellin 5

Malha Arena, Jerusalem
Attendance: 2800

Hapoel Jerusalem won by an aggregate score of 169-162 and advanced to the group stage.

October 28, 2009

Report

(Montenegro) KK Budućnost	67–65	(Germany) Brose Baskets
Pts: Gordić 19; Rebs: Simonović 8 Asts: Jeretin 2		Pts: Suput 15; Rebs: Roberts, Goldsberry 6 Asts: five players 2

Morača Sports Center, Podgorica
Attendance: 2500

Brose Baskets won by an aggregate score of 129-128 and advanced to the group stage.

November 3, 2009

Report

(Spain) Bizkaia Bilbao Basket	90–79	(Ukraine) BC Donetsk
Pts: Banić 28; Rebs: Moïso 6 Asts: Warren 4		Pts: Perry 18; Rebs: Drozdov 8 Asts: Tucker 5

Bizkaia Arena, Bilbao
Attendance: 8400

Bizkaia Bilbao Basket won by an aggregate score of 153-150 and advanced to the group stage.
