= 2009–10 Euroleague Qualifying rounds =

Results for the Euroleague 2009-2010 tournament

Main page: Euroleague 2009–10

The Qualifying round phase of the 2009–10 Euroleague basketball tournament is preceding the regular season. 8 teams will compete in two preliminary rounds, of which 2 teams will advance to the regular season stage.

== First preliminary round ==
Team #1	Agg.	Team #2	1st leg	2nd leg
Spirou Charleroi (Belgium)	111–134	(France) Entente Orléans Loiret	55–53	56–81
BK Ventspils (Latvia)	154–161	(Italy) Benetton Treviso	78–73	76–88
Le Mans Sarthe Basket (France)	123–137	(Germany) ALBA Berlin	61–60	62–77
Aris Salonica (Greece)	129–156	(Greece) Maroussi Athens	69–67	60–89

== Results ==
All times given below are in Central European Time.

Unless otherwise indicated, all attendance totals are from the corresponding match report posted on the official Euroleague site and included with each game summary.

=== Game 1 ===
29 September 2009
18:00

Report

Aris Salonica (Greece)	69–67	(Greece) Maroussi Athens
Scoring by quarter: 9-17, 21-12, 22-23, 14-15
Pts: Betts 15; Rebs: Betts 11; Asts: Clark 4		Pts: Homan 13; Rebs: Homan 10; Asts: Mavroeidis 4

Palais des Sports
Attendance: 5,000
Referees: Romualdas Brazauskas (LTU), Marek Cmikiewicz (POL), Marko Juras (SRB)

29 September 2009
19:00

Report

BK Ventspils (Latvia)	78–73	(Italy) Benetton Treviso
Scoring by quarter: 27-17, 20-17, 21-22, 10-17
Pts: Pettway 20; Rebs: Pettway 17; Asts: Strēlnieks 5		Pts: Hackett 13; Rebs: Neal 10; Asts: 4 players with 2

Arena Riga
Attendance: 3,500
Referees: Volodymr Drabikovsky (UKR), Tomas Jaševičius (LTU), Boris Shulga (UKR)

29 September 2009
20:15

Report

Spirou Charleroi (Belgium)	55–53	(France) Entente Orléans Loiret
Scoring by quarter: 13–14, 13–11, 20–5, 9–23
Pts: Johnson 10; Rebs: Riddick 7 Asts: Johnson 6		Pts: Nichols 14; Rebs: Banks 5 Asts: Sciarra 3

Spiroudome
Attendance: 6,000
Referees: Fabio Facchini (ITA), Antonio Conde (ESP), Sergiy Zashchuck (UKR)

29 September 2009
20:30

Report

Le Mans Sarthe Basket (France)	61–60	(Germany) ALBA Berlin
Scoring by quarter: 17–7, 17–20, 17–21, 10–12
Pts: Salyers 28; Rebs: Z. Wright 7 Asts: Z. Wright 4		Pts: Chubb 16; Rebs: Chubb, R. Wright 5 Asts: McElroy 5

Antarès
Attendance: 4,600
Referees: Luigi Lamonica (ITA), Emilio Pérez Pizarro (ESP), Renaud Geller (BEL)

=== Game 2 ===
2 October 2009
20:30

Report

Entente Orléans Loiret (France)	81–56	(Belgium) Spirou Charleroi
Scoring by quarter: 26–15, 20–15, 12–9, 23–17
Pts: Covile 17; Rebs: Vaty 7 Asts: Sciarra 5		Pts: Johnson 15; Rebs: Riddick 10; Asts: Broyles 4

Zénith d'Orléans
Attendance: 5,200
Referees: Dani Hierrezuelo (ESP), Luís Lopes (POR), Robert Lottermoser (GER)

2 October 2009
20:45

Report

Benetton Treviso (Italy)	88–76	(Latvia) BK Ventspils
Scoring by quarter: 25–20, 25–20, 17–19, 21–17
Pts: Hackett 22; Rebs: Wallace 9 Asts: Nicević 4		Pts: Bertans, Jurevičus 16; Rebs: Pettway 8 Asts: Jurevičus 3

Palaverde
Attendance: 2,427
Referees: Sradan Dozai (CRO), Spiros Gontas (GRE), Marius Ciulin (ROU)

2 October 2009
20:00

Report

ALBA Berlin (Germany)	77–62	(France) Le Mans Sarthe Basket
Scoring by quarter: 17–13, 20–10, 24–15, 16–24
Pts: Jenkins, Chubb 12; Rebs: Chubb 8 Asts: Hamann, Jenkins 5		Pts: Spencer 16; Rebs: Z. Wright 6 Asts: Salyers 3

O_{2} World
Attendance: 11,310
Referees: Lazaros Voreadis (GRE), Fernando Rocha (POR), Matej Boltauzer (SLO)

2 October 2009
20:00

Report

Maroussi Athens (Greece)	89–60	(Greece) Aris Salonica
Scoring by quarter: 27–9, 18–18, 21–22, 23–11
Pts: Keys, Pelekanos 18; Rebs: Keys 8 Asts: Lucas 5		Pts: Clark, Hatzivrettas 15; Rebs: Barlos 8 Asts: Hatzivrettas 2

OAKA
Attendance: 1,650
Referees: Shmuel Bachar (ISR), Eddie Viator (FRA), Rüştü Nuran (TUR)

== Second preliminary round ==
Team #1	Agg.	Team #2	1st leg	2nd leg
Benetton Treviso (Italy)	155–162	(France) Entente Orléans Loiret	73–82	82–80
Maroussi Athens (Greece)	149–145	(Germany) ALBA Berlin	79–70	70–75

== Results ==
=== Game 1 ===
6 October 2009
20:45

Report

Benetton Treviso (Italy)	73–82	(France) Entente Orléans Loiret
Scoring by quarter: 20–20, 6–27, 22–19, 25–16
Pts: Martin 23; Rebs: Nicević 8 Asts: 3 players with 4		Pts: Banks 22; Rebs: 3 players with 6 Asts: Dobbins 4

Palaverde
Attendance: 2,440
Referees: Christos Christodoulou (GRE), Milivoje Jovčić (SRB), Sreten Radović (CRO)

6 October 2009
20:00

Report

Maroussi Athens (Greece)	79–70	(Germany) ALBA Berlin
Scoring by quarter: 12–19, 18–19, 28–13, 21–19
Pts: Mavroeidis 19; Rebs: Mavroeidis 5 Asts: Lucas 5		Pts: Sekulić 14; Rebs: Sekulić 9 Asts: Wright 4

Peace and Friendship Stadium
Attendance: 950
Referees: Fabio Facchini (ITA), Siniša Herceg (CRO), David Chambon (FRA)

=== Game 2 ===
9 October 2009
20:30

Report

Entente Orléans Loiret (France)	80–82	(Italy) Benetton Treviso
Scoring by quarter: 20–14, 18–19, 13–26, 29–23
Pts: Moerman, Nichols 15; Rebs: Dobbins 8 Asts: Sciarra 7		Pts: Neal 29; Rebs: Hukić 9 Asts: Hackett 5

Zénith d'Orléans
Attendance: 5,200
Referees: Romualdas Brazkauskas (LTU), Juan Carlos García González (ESP), Robert Vyklicky (CZE)

9 October 2009
17:00

Report

ALBA Berlin (Germany)	75–70	(Greece) Maroussi Athens
Scoring by quarter: 19-21, 24-17, 13-17, 19-15
Pts: Jenkins 32; Rebs: McElroy 7 Asts: Wright 5		Pts: Keys 17; Rebs: Kendall 5 Asts: Keys, Batis 2

O_{2} World
Attendance: 12,196
Referees: Grzegorz Ziemblicki (POL), Guerrino Cerebuch (ITA), Olegs Latisevs (LAT)
