= 2014–15 EuroChallenge Group G =

Basketball tournament group stage

Group G of the 2014–15 EuroChallenge consisted of Port of Antwerp Giants, KTP-Basket, Le Mans Sarthe Basket and Pallacanestro Biella. Play began on 4 November and ended on 16 December 2014.

== Teams ==
Draw seed	Team	City	Country	Last appearance	2013–14			Arena	Capacity
Draw seed	Team	City	Country	Last appearance	League	Pos.	Playoffs	Arena	Capacity
I	Port of Antwerp Giants	Antwerp	Belgium	2013–14	Ethias League	6th	SF	Lotto Arena	5,218
II	KTP-Basket	Kotka	Finland	2013–14	Korisliiga	4th	SF	Steveco-areena	1,600
III	Le Mans Sarthe Basket	Le Mans	France	—	LNB Pro A	5th	QF	Antarès	6,003
IV	Pallacanestro Biella	Biella	Italy	—	LegaDue	4th	—	BiellaForum	5,707

== Standings ==
Pos	Team	Pld	W	L	PF	PA	PD	Pts	MSB	ANT	BIE	KTP
1	(France) Le Mans Sarthe (Q)	6	5	1	478	414	+64	11		72–66	88–74	71–52
2	(Belgium) Port of Antwerp Giants (Q)	6	3	3	542	514	+28	9 (Note: Head-to-head: 1–1 (+9))	78–87		92–82	98–83
3	(Italy) Bonprix Biella	6	3	3	511	525	−14	9 (Note: Head-to-head: 1–1 (–9))	82–64	97–96		81–77
4	(Finland) KTP	6	1	5	475	553	−78	7	62–96	93–112	108–95	

(Q) Qualify for Top 16

== Results ==
=== Round 1 ===
4 November 2014

Boxscore

KTP-Basket (Finland)	108–95	(Italy) Bonprix Biella
Scoring by quarter: 16–21, 37–25, 31–18, 24–31

Kotka
Attendance: 870

4 November 2014

Le Mans Sarthe Basket (France)	72–66	(Belgium) Port of Antwerp Giants
Scoring by quarter: 18–22, 21–7, 6–21, 27–16
Pts: Michal Ignerski 18; Rebs: Mouphtaou Yarou 5 Asts: Shyron Ely 6		Pts: Kyle Fogg 13; Rebs: Jean-Marc Mwema 11; Asts: Moors, Callahan 3

Le Mans
Attendance: 3,400

=== Round 2 ===
11 November 2014

Boxscore

Le Mans Sarthe Basket (France)	71–52	(Finland) KTP-Basket
Pts: Daniel Ewing 14; Rebs: Mouphtaou Yarou 7 Asts: Beaubois & Ewing 4		Pts: Kenneth Simms 14; Rebs: LaMonte Ulmer 15; Asts: Brandon Jefferson 5

Le Mans
Attendance: 4,500

11 November 2014

Boxscore

Bonprix Biella (Italy)	97–96	(Belgium) Port of Antwerp Giants
Pts: Alan Voskuil 30; Rebs: Benjamin Raymond 9 Asts: Infante & Voskuil 8		Pts: Kyle Fogg 31; Rebs: Mwema & Archibeque 7 Asts: Jordan Callahan 6

Biella
Attendance: 1,655

=== Round 3 ===
18 November 2014

KTP-Basket (Finland)	93–112	(Belgium) Port of Antwerp Giants

19 November 2014

Pallacanestro Biella (Italy)	82–64	(France) Le Mans Sarthe Basket

=== Round 4 ===
2 December 2014

Port of Antwerp Giants (Belgium)	78–87	(France) Le Mans Sarthe Basket

2 December 2014

Pallacanestro Biella (Italy)	81–77	(Finland) KTP-Basket

=== Round 5 ===
9 December 2014

KTP-Basket (Finland)	62–92	(France) Le Mans Sarthe Basket

9 December 2014

Port of Antwerp Giants (Belgium)	92–82	(Italy) Pallacanestro Biella

=== Round 6 ===
16 December 2014

Port of Antwerp Giants (Belgium)	98–83	(Finland) KTP-Basket

16 December 2014

Le Mans Sarthe Basket (France)	88–74	(Italy) Pallacanestro Biella
