= Antonio Granger =

American basketball player (born 1976)

Personal information
- Born: June 6, 1976 (age 50) Detroit, Michigan, U.S.
- Listed height: 6 ft 7 in (2.01 m)
- Listed weight: 215 lb (98 kg)

Career information
- High school: Denby (Detroit, Michigan)
- College: Boston College (1994–1998)
- NBA draft: 1998: undrafted
- Playing career: 1998–2007
- Position: Shooting guard / small forward

Career history
- 1998: Olimpia Basket Pistoia
- 1998–2000: Rimini Basket
- 2000–2001: Biella
- 2001–2002: Sevilla
- 2002: Virtus Bologna
- 2002–2004: Efes Pilsen
- 2004–2005: CSKA Moscow
- 2005–2007: Efes Pilsen

Career highlights
- 2× Turkish League champion (2003, 2004); 2× Turkish Cup winner (2006, 2007); Russian League champion (2005); Russian Cup winner (2005); Italian Second Division MVP (2001)

Carl Antonio Granger (born June 6, 1976) is an American former professional basketball player. At 2.01 m (6 ft 7 in) tall, he played at the shooting guard and small forward positions.

== College career ==
After playing high school basketball at Denby High School in his hometown of Detroit, Michigan, Granger played college basketball at Boston College, with the Boston College Eagles. He was inducted into the Boston College Varsity Club Athletic Hall of Fame in 2012.

== Professional career ==
In his professional playing career, Granger played with: Olimpia Basket Pistoia, Rimini Basket, Biella, Sevilla, Virtus Bologna, Efes, and CSKA Moscow.
