= Carl Ona-Embo =

French-born Congolese basketball player

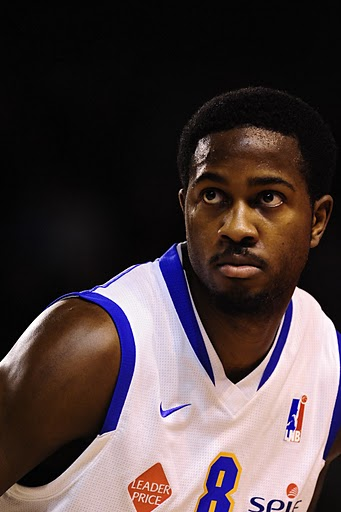
- Ona-Embo in 2011

Personal information
- Born: August 6, 1989 (age 37) Lille, France
- Listed height: 6 ft 2 in (1.88 m)
- Listed weight: 187 lb (85 kg)

Career information
- NBA draft: 2011: undrafted
- Playing career: 2007–2020
- Position: Point guard

Career history
- 2007–2008: Angelico Biella
- 2008–2009: Rosalía de Castro
- 2009–2010: Angelico Biella
- 2010–2011: Poitiers
- 2011–2013: Cholet
- 2013–2014: Antibes Sharks
- 2014–2015: Poitiers
- 2015–2016: JL Bourg
- 2016: Santa Cruz Warriors
- 2017–2018: Clermont
- 2018: Nantes
- 2018–2019: PS Karlsruhe Lions
- 2019: Caen
- 2019–2020: Poitiers

Carl Ona-Embo (born August 6, 1989) is a former French-born Congolese professional basketball player who last played for Poitiers of the French LNB Pro B league. In the past, he played for the Santa Cruz Warriors of the NBA Development League. Standing at 6 ft 2 in (1.88 m), he plays at the point guard position.

== Professional career ==
Ona-Embo played with Angelico Biella in the 2007–08 season. For the 2008–09 season he was loaned to Rosalía de Castro of the LEB Oro.

For the 2009–10 season, Ona-Embo returned to Angelico Biella.

In July 2010, Ona-Embo signed with Poitiers Basket 86 for the 2010–11 season.

From 2011 to 2013, Ona-Embo played with Cholet Basket. For the 2013–14 season he signed with Antibes Sharks.

In July 2014, Ona-Embo returned after three years to Poitiers Basket 86. In June 2015, he left Poitiers and signed with JL Bourg-en-Bresse.

On October 30, 2016, Ona-Embo was selected with the 49th pick of the 2016 NBA Development League draft by the Salt Lake City Stars. However, he was waived on November 8. On November 25, he was acquired by the Santa Cruz Warriors, but was waived on December 11 after averaging 2.2 points, 1.0 rebounds and 1.2 assists in 6 games.

On April 16, 2019, he has signed with Caen Basket of the French LNB.

== DR Congo national team ==
Ona-Embo played 3 games for the DR Congo national basketball team at the 2019 FIBA Basketball World Cup qualification where he averaged 6.3 points, 3.3 rebounds and 2.3 assists per game.
