= Delonte Holland =

American basketball player (born 1982)

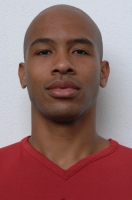
- Holland in 2008

Personal information
- Born: March 2, 1982 (age 44) Greenbelt, Maryland, U.S.
- Listed height: 6 ft 7 in (2.01 m)
- Listed weight: 220 lb (100 kg)

Career information
- High school: Eleanor Roosevelt (Greenbelt, Maryland)
- College: Independence CC (2000–2001); Vincennes (2001–2002); DePaul (2002–2004)
- Playing career: 2004–2015
- Position: Shooting guard / small forward

Career history
- 2004–2005: Atlas
- 2005–2006: Navigo.it Teramo
- 2006–2007: Whirlpool Varese
- 2007: La Fortezza / VidiVici Bologna
- 2008: Cimberio Varese
- 2008: Rio Grande Valley Vipers
- 2009: Seven 2007 Roseto
- 2009: Besançon
- 2009: Idaho Stampede
- 2010: Al Ahli Dubai
- 2010: Mazzeo San Severo
- 2010: Al Riyadi
- 2010: Dnipro-Azot
- 2011: 9 de Julio de Río Tercero
- 2011: Guerreros de Bogotá
- 2011: Atenas de Córdoba
- 2012: Toros de Aragua
- 2012: Leones de Santo Domingo
- 2012: Halcones UV Xalapa
- 2012: Islanders de San Andrés
- 2013: Antranik
- 2013: Toros de Aragua
- 2013: Búcaros de Santander
- 2013–2014: Al Ahli Doha
- 2014: Acereros de Guayana
- 2015: Panteras de Miranda

Delonte Jermaine Holland (born March 2, 1982) is an American former professional basketball player.

== High school and college career ==
Born and raised in Greenbelt, Maryland, Holland attended high school at Eleanor Roosevelt, where he teamed with future NBA players Eddie Basden and Delonte West. He played college basketball at Independence Community College and Vincennes University, before transferring to DePaul University. He spent two years with the Blue Demons, averaging 13.9 points per game. In 2003–04, with teammate Andre Brown, Holland earned All-Conference USA Second Team honors.

== Professional career ==
After going undrafted in the 2004 NBA draft, Holland started his professional career with Atlas in Serbia and Montenegro, on the same team with upcoming talent Nikola Peković. In May 2005, media reported that Holland left Atlas after the invitation by the Boston Celtics to join their training camp. However, he did not enter the NBA, after which he returned to Europe, signing for the Italian team Teramo.

On March 9, 2008, while playing for Cimberio Varese, Holland scored 50 points in a home game against Armani Jeans Milano. He made 18-for-31 from the floor, including 10-of-19 on treys. Despite his remarkable achievement, Varese would go on to lose the game 90–85. On the other side, the most valuable player was Danilo Gallinari, future NBA star, with 20 points.

After participated at the 2008 New York Knicks training camp, Holland was drafted by the Rio Grande Valley Vipers in the second round of the 2008 NBA Development League draft, but was waived after only two games due to injury. After recovery, Holland returned to Italy, having a short spell with Roseto, before signed with the French team Besançon for the remainder of the 2008–09 season.

In June 2011, Holland started his Latin American adventure by reaching an agreement with 9 de Julio de Río Tercero in Argentina. However, he left the team in September, after playing only one game. Soon after, Holland moved to Colombia and played for Guerreros de Bogotá, but quickly returned to Argentina, where he finished the year with Atenas de Córdoba. In January 2012, Holland signed with Toros de Aragua in Venezuela. In May 2012, Holland changed team and country once again, signing with Leones de Santo Domingo in the Dominican Republic.

== United States national team ==
Holland had represented the United States at the 2001 Tournament of the Americas.

== Career statistics ==
Season	Team	Competition	GP	GS	MPG	PPG
2002–03	(United States) DePaul Blue Demons	NCAA	28	20	25.5	10.9
2003–04	(United States) DePaul Blue Demons	NCAA	32	32	33.9	16.5
2005–06	(Italy) Navigo.it Teramo	Serie A	34	34	32.4	18.6
2006–07	(Italy) Whirlpool Varese	Serie A	37	34	32.7	17.5
2007–08	(Italy) La Fortezza Bologna	Serie A	13	11	28.8	13.2
2007–08	(Italy) Cimberio Varese	Serie A	15	15	37.7	25.0
2008–09	(United States) Rio Grande Valley Vipers	D-League	2	0	18.5	9.5
2008–09	(Italy) Seven 2007 Roseto	Legadue	7	6	30.4	16.4
2008–09	(France) Besançon	Pro A	4	4	23.0	11.5
2010–11	(Italy) Mazzeo San Severo	Legadue	4	4	28.0	14.3
2010–11	(Ukraine) Dnipro-Azot	Superleague	4	3	n/a	18.8
2011–12	(Argentina) 9 de Julio de Río Tercero	LNB	1	n/a	31.2	25.0
2011–12	(Argentina) Atenas de Córdoba	LNB	8	n/a	21.1	12.9
