= Goran Jurak =

Slovenian basketball player

Personal information
- Born: 3 April 1977 (age 49) Celje, SFR Yugoslavia
- Listed height: 6 ft 6.75 in (2.00 m)
- Listed weight: 225 lb (102 kg)

Career information
- Playing career: 1995–2016
- Number: 4

Career history
- 1995–1996: Celje KK
- 1996–2002: Pivovarna Laško
- 2002–2003: Union Olimpija
- 2003–2004: Olympiacos Piraeus
- 2004–2005: Sicc BPA Jesi
- 2005–2006: Vertical Vision Cantù
- 2006–2007: Union Olimpija
- 2007: Climamio Bologna
- 2007–2008: Žalgiris Kaunas
- 2008–2009: Pallacanestro Biella
- 2009–2010: Banca Tercas Teramo
- 2010–2013: Pallacanestro Biella
- 2013–2016: Zlatorog Laško

Career highlights
- Slovenian Cup Winner (2003); BBL Champion (2008); LKL Champion (2008); LKF Cup (2008); LKL All-Star (2008)

Goran Jurak (born 3. April 1977 in Celje, SFR Yugoslavia (present-day Slovenia)) is a Slovenian former professional basketball player.

He plays the position of Power forward. He played in the Slovenian All Star Game 1999 through 2002. He was a member of the Slovenian national team.

He join, before season 2017-18, KK Celje as director of manager board.

== Career statistics ==
Legend
| GP | Games played | GS | Games started | MPG | Minutes per game |
| FG% | Field-goal percentage | 3P% | 3-point field-goal percentage | FT% | Free-throw percentage |
| RPG | Rebounds per game | APG | Assists per game | SPG | Steals per game |
| BPG | Blocks per game | PPG | Points per game | PIR | Performance index rating |
| **Bold** | Career high |

=== Euroleague ===
| Year | Team | GP | GS | MPG | FG% | 3P% | FT% | RPG | APG | SPG | BPG | PPG | PIR |
|---|---|---|---|---|---|---|---|---|---|---|---|---|---|
| 2002–03 | Union Olimpija | 20 | 16 | 21.2 | .487 | .571 | .577 | 5.0 | 1.0 | 1.1 | .1 | 10.9 | 10.4 |
| 2003–04 | Olympiacos | 20 | 18 | 26.1 | .510 | .250 | .565 | 4.8 | 1.4 | 1.1 | .2 | 7.7 | 8.8 |
| 2006–07 | Union Olimpija | 2 | 0 | 27.5 | .600 | .333 | .600 | 7.0 | 2.0 | 2.0 | .0 | 10.5 | 15.5 |
| 2007–08 | Žalgiris | 19 | 1 | 17.2 | .635 | .250 | .634 | 5.2 | .7 | .8 | .1 | 6.8 | 7.9 |

== Sources ==
- (Goodyear League)
