= Kevin Fletcher =

American-born Macedonian basketball player (born 1980)

Personal information
- Born: January 11, 1980 (age 46) Denver, Colorado, U.S.
- Listed height: 6 ft 10 in (2.08 m)
- Listed weight: 250 lb (113 kg)

Career information
- High school: East (Denver, Colorado)
- College: UCCS (1998–2002)
- NBA draft: 2002: undrafted
- Playing career: 2002–2015
- Position: Power forward / center

Career history
- 2002–2003: Casino Figueira Ginasio
- 2003–2004: Aveiro Basket
- 2004: SKS Polphamra-Pakmet Starogard Gd.
- 2005: Ostromecko Astoria Bydgoszcz
- 2005–2006: Deichmann Slask Wroclaw
- 2006–2007: Aris BC
- 2007–2008: Universitet Yugra Surgut
- 2008–2009: Enisey Krasnoyarsk
- 2009–2010: Beşiktaş Cola Turka
- 2010–2011: Teramo Basket
- 2011–2012: Juvecaserta Basket
- 2013–2014: Krasny Oktyabr
- 2015: AZS Polfarmex Kutno

Kevin Fletcher (born January 11, 1980) is an American-born Macedonian former professional basketball player.
