= Levance Fields =

American professional basketball player

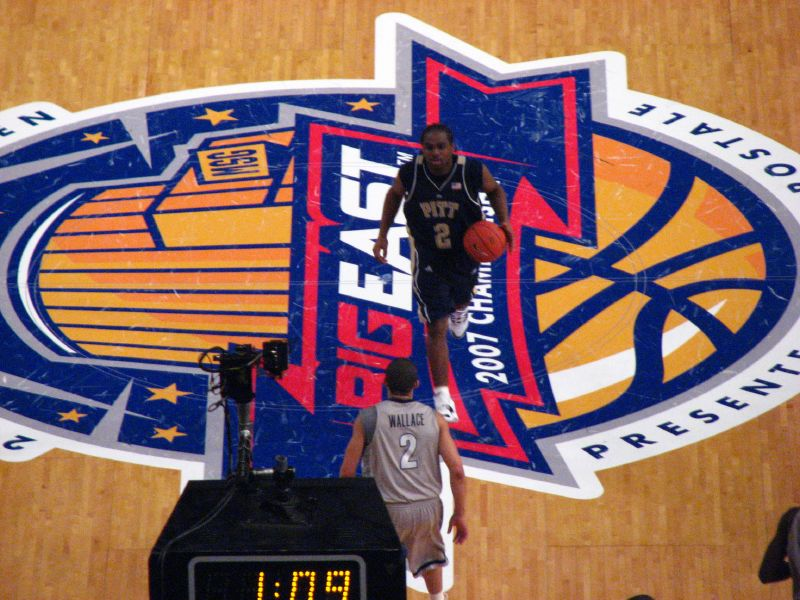
- Fields running the point for Pitt in 2007

Free agent
- Position: Point guard

Personal information
- Born: June 14, 1987 (age 39) Brooklyn, New York, U.S.
- Listed height: 5 ft 10 in (1.78 m)
- Listed weight: 190 lb (86 kg)

Career information
- High school: Xaverian (Brooklyn, New York)
- College: Pittsburgh (2005–2009)
- NBA draft: 2009: undrafted
- Playing career: 2009–2013

Career history
- 2009–2010: Spartak St. Petersburg
- 2013: Kolín

Levance E. Fields (born June 14, 1987) is an American professional basketball player. He played college basketball at the University of Pittsburgh.

== Early life ==
He is from Brooklyn, New York and attended Xaverian High School. LeVance's parents separated when Fields was very young because his dad had drug and alcohol problems. He played AAU basketball as a kid and teen. His mom wanted him to see the world and not be around all the bad things in his hometown, Brooklyn. Fields was the starting point guard for his high school team. Fields was named New York Player of the Year by the Daily News and Newsday. He committed to Pittsburgh on December 6, 2004, just minutes after scoring 20 points and dishing out 11 assists in a win against St. Agnes.

== College career ==
During his sophomore season in college, he was named as the starting point guard for Pitt. He averaged 9.2 points, 3.6 rebounds, and 4.6 assists per game for the Panthers in 2006–07. He wore jersey #2.

Fields finished his Pitt playing career with 1,247 points and 645 assists, which is third all-time at Pitt behind Brandin Knight (785) and Sean Miller (744). During his senior year, Fields had 270 assists, which is a single season school record.

During his time at Pitt, Fields was known for his excellent ball-handling, his high assist-to-turnover ratio, and—despite having an unorthodox shooting style—his knack for hitting clutch shots. His stepback, game-winning 3-pointer to defeat Duke at Madison Square Garden and his timely 3-pointer in the NCAA Tournament vs. VCU in 2007 are his top clutch moments. He also led his team back in the 2009 Sweet 16 vs Xavier.

== Professional career ==
In the summer of 2009, Levance played for the Orlando Magic's summer league team. He failed to make an NBA roster after the summer season and signed a multiyear contract with Spartak St. Petersburg of the Russian Basketball Super League in July 2009. In December 2010 he signed with BC Krasnye Krylya Samara, but then failed to pass the medical examination and was waived. In August 2013, he signed with BC Kolín in the Czech Republic.

== The Basketball Tournament (TBT) ==
In the summer of 2017, Fields competed in The Basketball Tournament on ESPN for Zoo Crew; a team composed of University of Pittsburgh basketball alum. Competing for the $2 million grand prize, Fields scored a game-high 35 points (11–18 FG, 11–12 FT), grabbed six rebounds and handed out six assists as Zoo Crew fell in the first-round 100–87 to Sideline Cancer. Fields also competed for the Untouchables in 2016. In four games that summer, he averaged 12.8 points, 2.5 rebounds and 2.0 assists per game; helping guide the Untouchables to a 3–1 record.
