= Erik Daniels =

American basketball player

Personal information
- Born: April 1, 1982 (age 44) Cincinnati, Ohio, U.S.
- Listed height: 6 ft 8 in (2.03 m)
- Listed weight: 215 lb (98 kg)

Career information
- High school: Princeton (Cincinnati, Ohio)
- College: Kentucky (2000–2004)
- NBA draft: 2004: undrafted
- Playing career: 2004–2015
- Position: Small forward

Career history
- 2004–2005: Sacramento Kings
- 2005–2006: Fayetteville Patriots
- 2006–2007: Angelico Biella
- 2007: Lottomatica Roma
- 2008: Akasvayu Girona
- 2008–2009: Erie BayHawks
- 2009–2010: Azovmash
- 2010: Hapoel Gilboa Galil Elyon
- 2010: Zagreb
- 2011: Erie BayHawks
- 2011–2012: Andrea Costa Imola
- 2012–2013: Erie BayHawks
- 2013–2014: BC Odesa
- 2014–2015: Quimsa

Career highlights
- All-NBA D-League First Team (2009); All-NBA D-League Second Team (2006); First-team All-SEC (2004)
- Stats at NBA.com
- Stats at Basketball Reference

Erik Christopher Daniels (born April 1, 1982) is an American former professional basketball player. He has played for the Sacramento Kings of the NBA, along with the Fayetteville Patriots and the Erie BayHawks of the NBA D-League. He played his college basketball at the University of Kentucky.

== College career ==
After graduating from Princeton High School in Sharonville, Ohio, Daniels went on to the University of Kentucky, where he played his way into the starting lineup his junior and senior year.

== Professional career ==
After going undrafted in the 2004 NBA draft, Daniels was signed by the Kings as a free agent. He got very limited playing time in the 2004–05 NBA season, amassing a mere 13 points and 18 rebounds over the span of 21 games. Daniels was released by the Kings on October 17, 2005, and signed with the D-League's Fayetteville Patriots.

In the 2006–2007 season he played with the Angelico Biella of the Italian Serie A league, and in the summer of 2007 he was signed by Lottomatica Roma for the next two seasons. He was selected with the 7th pick in the first round of the 2008 NBA D-League Draft by the Erie BayHawks. On February 11, 2009, Daniels would become the first BayHawk selected to the NBA D-League All-Star game. He would be named an alternate on the All-Star game's blue team.

On March 19, 2010, he joined Hapoel Gilboa Galil Elyon from the Israeli Basketball Super League, with whom he won the 2010 championship.

On November 7, 2013, Erik returned to Ukrainian Superleague, having signed a contract with BC Odesa.

On November 29, 2014, he signed with Argentinian team Quimsa.
