= Johannes Strasser =

German basketball head coach (born 1982)

Personal information
- Born: 13 June 1982 (age 44) Dachau, Bavaria, Germany

Career information
- NBA draft: 1998: undrafted
- Playing career: 1998–2013
- Position: Guard
- Coaching career: 2014–present

Career history

Playing
- 1998–1999: TSV Dachau
- 1999–2001: Dragons Rhöndorf
- 2001–2007: RheinStars Köln Cologne
- 2007–2010: Telekom Baskets Bonn
- 2010–2013: Artland Dragons
- 2013–2014: RheinStars Köln Cologne

Coaching
- 2014–2015: RheinStars Köln Cologne
- 2017–2018: RheinStars Köln Cologne (assistant)
- 2019–2021: RheinStars Köln Cologne

Career highlights
- As Player: Basketball Bundesliga champion (2006); 3× German Cup champion (2004, 2005, 2007); As head coach: 2× 1. Regionalliga West Division champion (2015, 2020); 1. Regionalliga West Division Coach of the Year (2020)

Johannes Strasser (born 6 July 1982) is a German basketball head coach who last coached the German team, RheinStars Köln Cologne of the 1. Regionalliga.

== Playing career ==
In his last career game, Strasser recorded 2 points in a 74–94 loss to the Ratiopharm Ulm.

== Coaching career ==
Strasser, after playing for 16 years for different teams, have decided to take the opportunity of coaching a basketball team. He was then selected as the head coach of RheinStars Köln Cologne and immediately made an impact to the franchise. He led the team to a first place and won the division champion. Afterwards, in 2016, he was transferred to become the coordinator of school instructors within Cologne, thus leaving the team. Then he came back in 2019, and again leading his team to a division champion.
