= Konrad Wysocki =

Polish-German basketball player

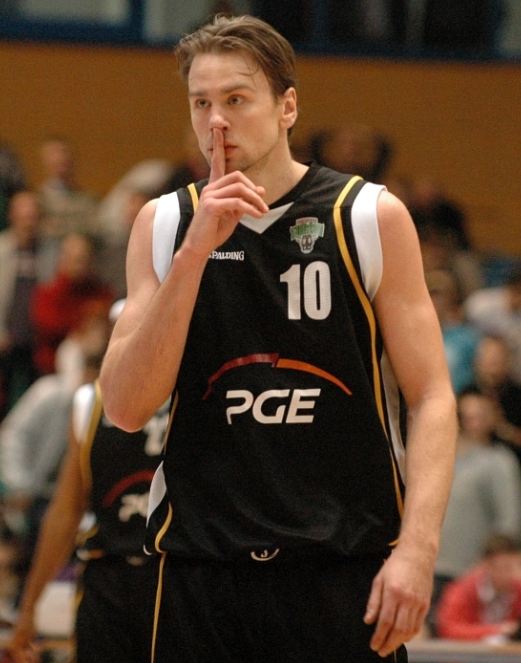
- Wysocki with Turów Zgorzelec (2011)

No. 10 – Crailsheim Merlins
- Position: Small forward
- League: Basketball Bundesliga

Personal information
- Born: March 28, 1982 (age 44) Rzeszów, Poland
- Listed height: 6 ft 7 in (2.01 m)
- Listed weight: 228.8 lb (104 kg)

Career information
- College: Princeton (2000–2004)
- NBA draft: 2004: undrafted
- Playing career: 2004–present

Career history
- 2004–2005: Göttingen
- 2005–2006: Erdgas Ehingen
- 2006–2008: ratiopharm Ulm
- 2008–2009: Skyliners Frankfurt
- 2009–2012: Turów Zgorzelec
- 2012–2014: EWE Oldenburg
- 2014–2015: Anwil Włocławek
- 2015–2019: Crailsheim Merlins

Konrad Wysocki (born 28 March 1982) is a former Polish-German professional basketball player who played for Ulm, Frankfurt, Oldenburg and Crailsheim in the Basketball Bundesliga. He also had two stints in Poland's top-tier. Standing at 2.01 m (6 ft 7 in), he played at the small forward position. He retired following the 2018–19 season. Wysocki played a total of 256 games in the German Bundesliga and won 51 caps for the German men's national team. In 2008, he played in the Olympic Games. From 2000 to 2004, he attended Princeton University in the United States, representing the Tigers' men's basketball team in 82 games.

== German national team ==
Wysocki has also been a member of the German national basketball team.

== See also ==
- List of Princeton University Olympians
