= Jesse Young (basketball) =

Canadian-Irish basketball player

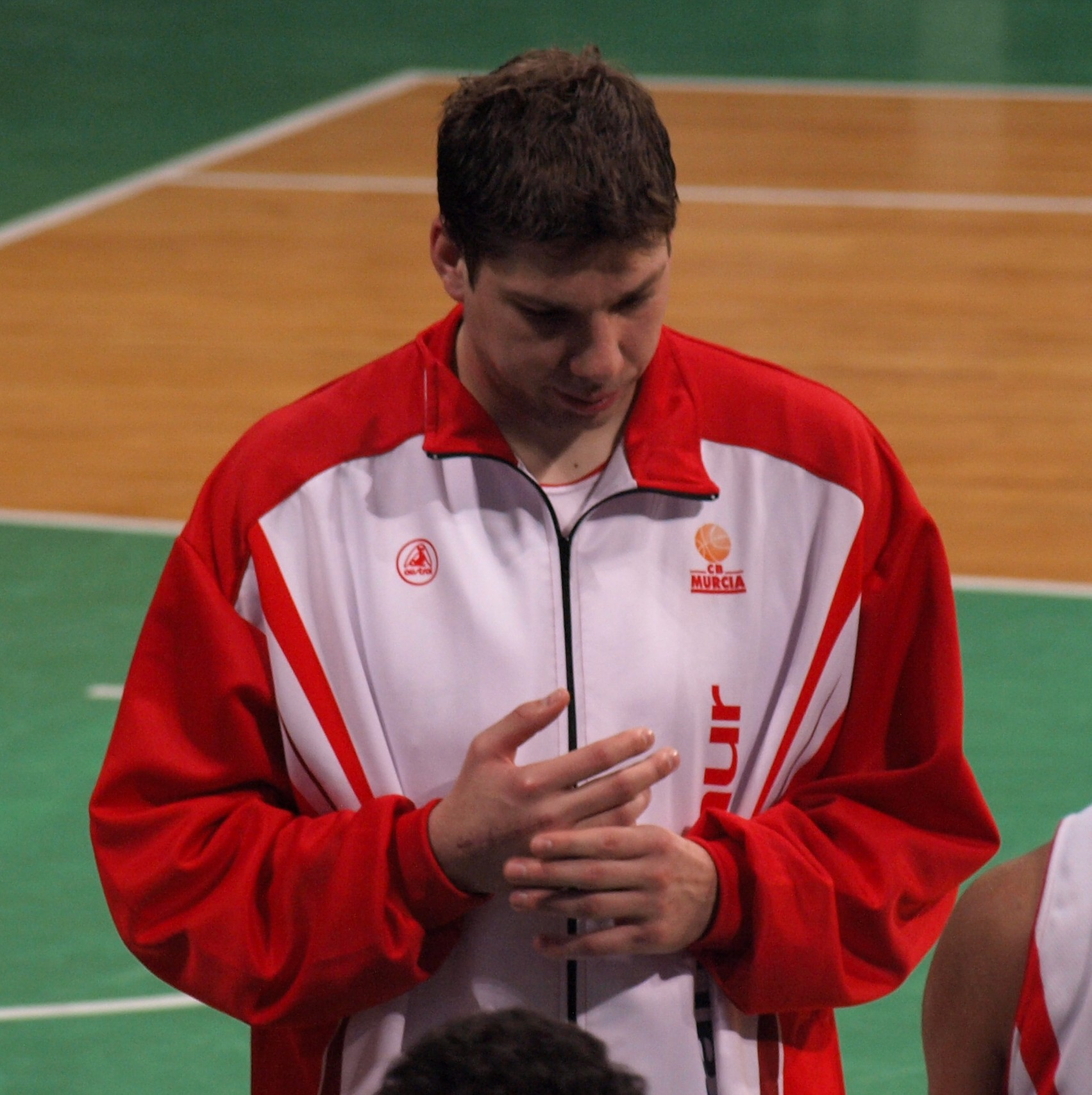

Personal information
- Born: 29 April 1980 (age 46) Peterborough, Ontario, Canada
- Listed height: 6 ft 10 in (2.08 m)
- Listed weight: 225 lb (102 kg)

Career information
- High school: Peterborough Collegiate (Peterborough, Ontario)
- College: George Mason (1999–2003)
- NBA draft: 2003: undrafted
- Playing career: 2003–2011
- Position: Center

Career history
- 2003–2004: Drac Inca
- 2004–2007: DKV Joventut
- 2007–2008: MMT Estudiantes
- 2008–2009: CB Murcia
- 2009–2011: Teramo Basket

Jesse Wade Young (born 29 April 1980) is a Canadian former professional basketball player. He also holds Irish citizenship. He played 2008-09 for Spain ACB league club CB Murcia. He signed for Bancatercas Teramo Basket (Italy LegaA) for 2009/2010 season. After being a free-agent for the first part of the season, in January 2011 he signed again for Bancatercas Teramo Basket till the end of the Italian top division season. On 14 December 2011 Young announced that he was retiring from basketball.

== Honours ==
Clubs Honours

- Catalan League Champion - 2005/2006
- FIBA EuroCup Champion - 2005/2006

== Career statistics ==
Correct as of 12 October 2007

Season	Team	League	GP	MPG	RPG	APG	PPG
1999-00	George Mason	NCAA (USA)	30	12	2.2	0.6	3.4
2000-01	George Mason	NCAA (USA)	30	23	5.9	0.6	8.2
2001-02	George Mason	NCAA (USA)	29	32	8.4	1.4	14.6
2002-03	George Mason	NCAA (USA)	26	30	8.5	1.2	11.6
2003-04	Inca	LEB (Spain)	37	26	6.9	0.7	11.4
2004-05	Joventut	ACB (Spain)	33	15	3.5	0.5	6.9
2005-06	Joventut	ACB (Spain)	26	17	3.2	0.7	6.8

== National career ==
Young was a member of the Canada national team that participated in the 1999 and 2003 Pan American Games. He also played at the FIBA Americas Championship 2007 averaging 6.8 points and 3.4 rebound per game.
