= Brion Rush =

American basketball player (born 1984)

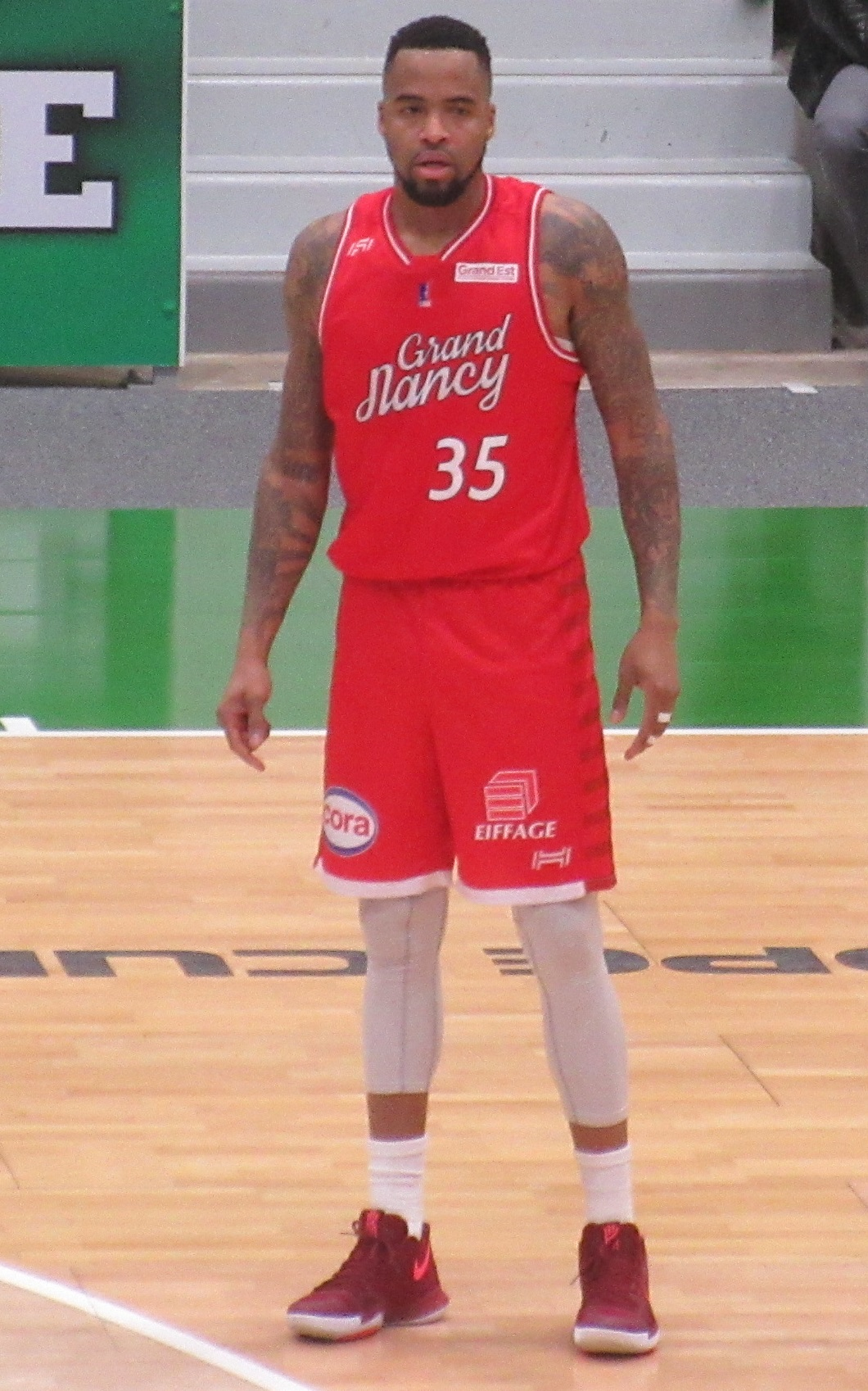
- Rush in 2017

No. 15 – Crailsheim Merlins
- Position: Shooting guard
- League: Basketball Bundesliga

Personal information
- Born: November 15, 1984 (age 42) Shreveport, Louisiana
- Listed height: 6 ft 1 in (1.85 m)
- Listed weight: 168 lb (76 kg)

Career information
- High school: Huntington (Shreveport, Louisiana)
- College: Grambling State (2002–2006)
- NBA draft: 2006: undrafted
- Playing career: 2006–present

Career history
- 2006–2007: Aurora Jesi
- 2007–2008: Chorale Roanne
- 2008–2009: SIG Strasbourg
- 2009–2010: Triumph Lyubertsy
- 2010–2012: Krasnye Krylia
- 2012: Élan Chalon
- 2012–2014: Astana
- 2015: ratiopharm Ulm
- 2016: Sutjeska
- 2016: Azad University Tehran
- 2016: Manresa
- 2016–2017: SLUC Nancy
- 2017–2018: Göttingen
- 2018–present: Crailsheim Merlins

Career highlights
- Russian Cup MVP (2012); SWAC Player of the Year (2006); 3× First-team All-SWAC (2004–2006)

Lonniel Brion Rush (born November 15, 1984) is an American professional basketball player for the Crailsheim Merlins of the Basketball Bundesliga (BBL). He played college basketball for Grambling State University.

== College career ==
Brion Rush played college basketball for Grambling State from Southwestern Athletic Conference. He averaged 19.5 ppg, 5.2 rpg, 2.8 apg and 1.7 spg during his college career. Rush was named SWAC Freshman of the Year in 2003, three times All-SWAC first team (in 2004–2006) and Player of the Year in 2006.

== Professional career ==
Rush went undrafted in the 2006 NBA draft. In August 2006, he signed a one-year deal with Aurora Basket Jesi of the Legadue Basket.

In June 2007, Rush signed a one-year deal with the French Euroleague team Chorale Roanne Basket. For the 2008–09 season he signed with Strasbourg IG. He was the second best scorer of the season, averaging 21.20 points per game.

In September 2009, he signed a one-year deal with Triumph Lyubertsy of Russia. In July 2010, he signed a two-year deal with another Russian club BC Krasnye Krylia.

In October 2012, he signed a short-term deal with Élan Chalon of France. After the contract expired, he left Chalon. In December 2012, he signed with BC Astana of Kazakhstan. In April 2014, he re-signed with Astana for one more season.

In February 2015, Rush signed with ratiopharm Ulm of Germany for the rest of the season.

On December 29, 2015, he signed with the Montenegrin club Sutjeska. On February 17, 2016, he parted ways with Sutjeska. The next day, he signed with Azad University Tehran of the Iranian Basketball Super League.

In October 2016, Rush agreed a one-month with Spanish club ICL Manresa. On December 18, 2016, he signed with French club SLUC Nancy Basket for the rest of the season.

On August 1, 2017, Rush signed with German club BG Göttingen.
