= PalaScapriano =

Sport venue in Teramo, Italy

Coordinates: 42°40′10.84″N 13°41′14.55″E

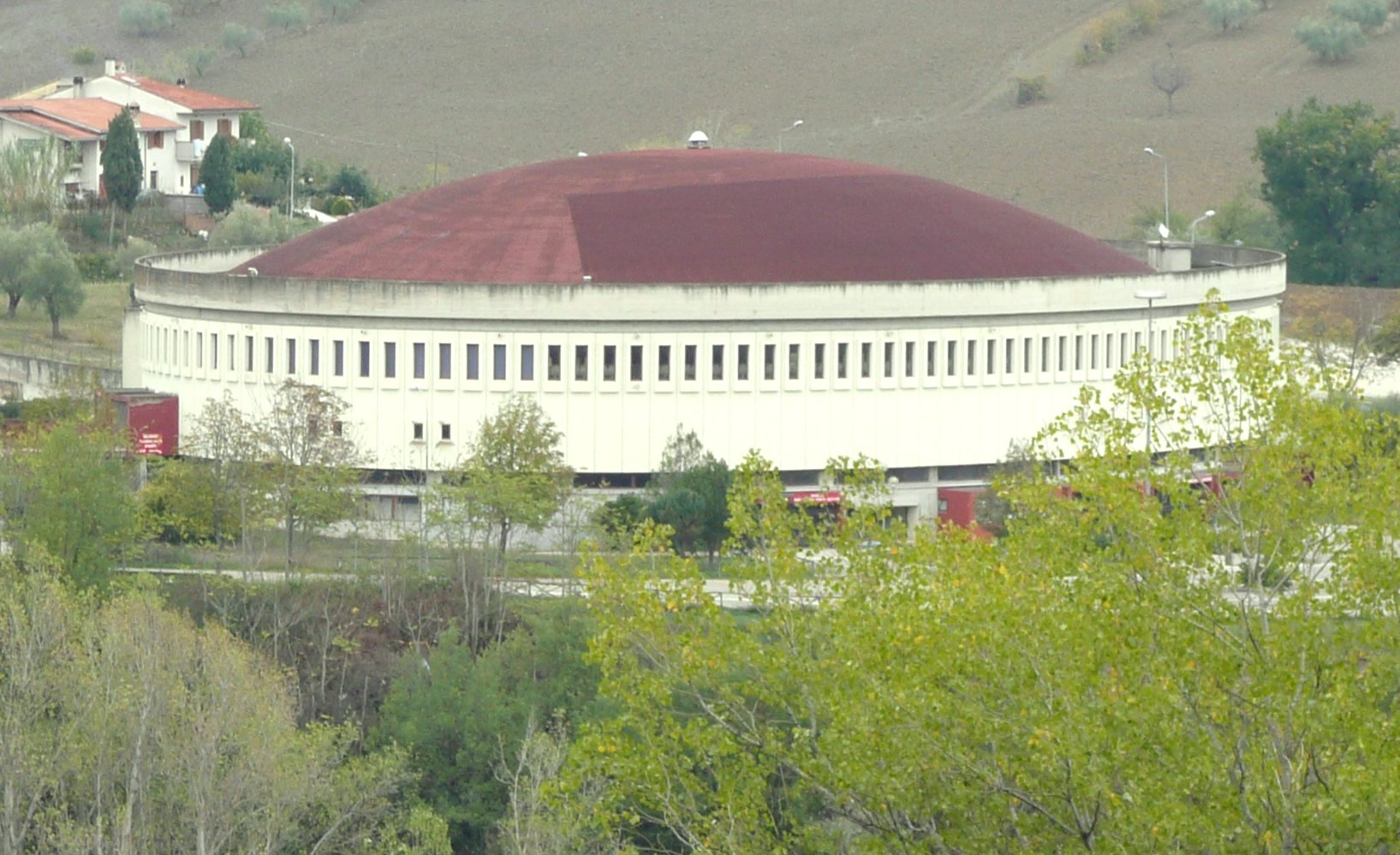
PalaScapriano Arena

PalaScapriano is an indoor sporting arena located in Teramo, central Italy. It was inaugurated in 1980, and restored in the 2002-2008 period.

The capacity of the arena is 3,500 people. It has an elliptical dome in mixed brick-concrete construction, measuring 63 x 44.30 meters. It is currently home to the Teramo Basket.
