= Zach Wright =

American soccer player

Personal information
- Date of birth: December 18, 1995 (age 30)
- Place of birth: Smithville, Texas, U.S.
- Height: 1.80 m (5 ft 11 in)
- Position: Forward

Youth career
- 2013–2014: Sporting Kansas City

College career
Years	Team	Apps	(Gls)
2014–2017	North Carolina Tar Heels	79	(15)

Senior career*
Years	Team	Apps	(Gls)
2017	Tobacco Road FC	6	(3)
2018	Rio Grande Valley FC	9	(0)
2019	FC Tucson	22	(1)
2020	Atlantic City FC	0	(0)
- * Club domestic league appearances and goals as of October 21, 2019

Zach Wright (born December 18, 1995) is an American soccer player.

== Career ==
=== Youth and college ===
Wright played four years of college soccer at the University of North Carolina at Chapel Hill between 2014 and 2017. During his time with the Tar Heels, Jones tallied 15 goals and 28 assists across 79 appearances.

Wright also played for Premier Development League side Tobacco Road FC in 2017.

=== Professional ===
On January 17, 2018, Wright signed a homegrown player contract with MLS side Sporting Kansas City. However, he was waived by the club on February 27, 2018.

Wright signed with United Soccer League side Rio Grande Valley FC on March 16, 2018. He made his professional debut the same day in a 1–1 draw with Saint Louis FC. Wright and Rio Grande Valley mutually parted ways on August 23, 2018.
