= Kostas Charalampidis (basketball) =

Greek basketball player and coach (born 1976)

Kostas Charalampidis Κώστας Χαραλαμπίδης
Aris
- Title: Assistant coach
- League: Greek Basketball League; EuroCup

Personal information
- Born: April 4, 1976 (age 50) Thessaloniki, Greece
- Listed height: 6 ft 2.5 in (1.89 m)
- Listed weight: 200 lb (91 kg)

Career information
- NBA draft: 1998: undrafted
- Playing career: 1997–2016
- Position: Shooting guard / point guard
- Coaching career: 2016–present

Career history

Playing
- 1997–2002: Makedonikos
- 2002–2004: Olympia Larissas
- 2004–2006: Makedonikos
- 2006–2009: Maroussi
- 2009–2010: Panellinios
- 2010–2011: Aris
- 2011–2012: KAOD
- 2012: Brindisi
- 2012–2016: PAOK

Coaching
- 2016–2019: PAOK (assistant)
- 2019–2020: PAOK
- 2020–2022: Panathinaikos (assistant)
- 2021: Panathinaikos (interim)
- 2022–2024: Peristeri (assistant)
- 2024–2026: AS Monaco (assistant)
- 2024–present: Greece (assistant)
- 2026–present: Aris (assistant)

Career highlights
- As a player: All-EuroCup Second Team (2010); 3× Greek League All-Star (2009, 2010, 2013); 2× Greek Second Division champion (2000, 2002); Greek Second Division MVP (2002)

Konstantinos "Kostas" Charalampidis (alternate spellings: Constantinos, Costas, Haralampidis, Haralambidis, Haralabidis, Charalambides) (Greek: Κωνσταντίνος "Κώστας" Χαραλαμπίδης; born April 4, 1976) is a retired Greek professional basketball player and coach. During his playing career, he was a 6 ft 2 1/2 in (1.89 m) tall point guard-shooting guard. He currently serves as an assistant coach for Aris of the Greek Basketball League and the EuroCup, as well as for the senior men's Greek national team, working under head coach Vassilis Spanoulis.

== Professional career ==
Charalampidis began his career playing with the youth teams of the Greek club Makedonikos Neapolis. He began his professional club career with the senior men's team of Makedonikos Neapolis, during the 1997–98 season, and he stayed there through the 2001–02 season. In 2002, he joined the Greek club Olympia Larissa.

In 2004, he returned to Makedonikos. As a member of Makedonikos, he won the Greek Second Division championship twice, in the years 2000 and 2002. He was named the MVP of the Greek Second Division in 2002. With Makedonikos, he also played in the 2005 Final of Europe's 2nd-tier continental competition, the EuroCup.

In 2006, he joined the Greek club Maroussi Athens. In 2009, he moved to the Greek club Panellinios Athens, where he was named to the All-EuroCup Second Team, for the 2009–10 season. In 2010, he joined the Greek club Aris Thessaloniki.

Charalampidis joined the Greek club KAOD in 2011, and he moved to the Italian Second Division club Brindisi, in 2012. He then joined the Greek club PAOK Thessaloniki, for the 2012–13 season. He extended his contract with PAOK in 2014.

Charalampidis last played in an official game on 25 November 2014, when he suffered a serious knee injury. After being unable to overcome the knee injury, he officially announced his retirement from his pro basketball playing career in 2016.

== National team career ==
Charalampidis played with Greece's junior national team at the 1999 World University Games. Charalampidis also had three caps with the senior men's Greek national team, in 2011.

== Coaching career ==
After he retired from playing professional club basketball, Charalampidis began a career as a basketball coach. He became an assistant coach with the Greek club PAOK Thessaloniki in 2016, working under the club's head coach at the time, Soulis Markopoulos. In 2019, he became PAOK's head coach.

In the summer of 2020, Charalampidis became an assistant coach with the Greek EuroLeague club Panathinaikos Athens. With Panathinaikos, he was first an assistant coach under head coach Georgios Vovoras, and then later under head coach Oded Kattash. In 2021, he also served as the interim head coach of Panathinaikos.

In 2022, he became an assistant coach of the Greek club Peristeri Athens, working under head coach Vassilis Spanoulis. In June 2024, Charalampidis was added to Spanoulis' coaching staff with the senior men's Greek national team, and was part of the staff during Greece's qualification for and participation in the 2024 Summer Olympics.

Charalampidis subsequently followed Spanoulis to the French Pro A and EuroLeague club AS Monaco, where he served as an assistant coach from 2024 to 2026.

On 20 June 2026, Aris announced that Charalampidis had joined Spanoulis' coaching staff as an assistant coach, alongside Ilias Kantzouris and Kostas Iliadis. He concurrently continues to serve as a member of the coaching staff of the Greek national team.

== Awards and accomplishments ==
=== As a player ===
- 2× Greek Second Division Champion: (2000, 2002)
- Greek Second Division MVP: (2002)
- EuroCup Finalist: (2005)
- 3× Greek League All-Star: (2009, 2010, 2013)
- All-EuroCup Second Team: (2010)
