= BiellaForum =

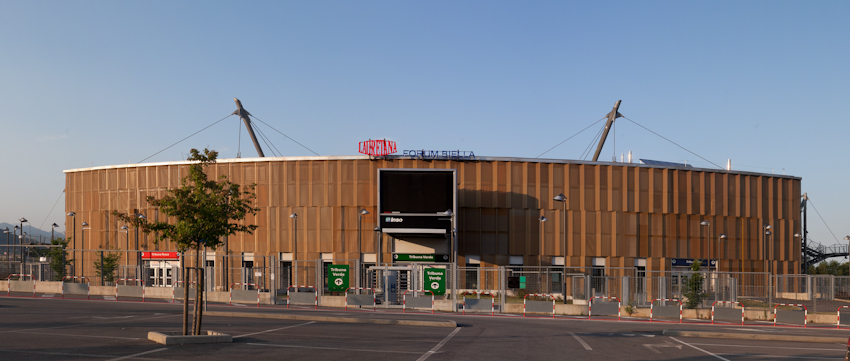
- Interactive map of BiellaForum
- Location: Biella, Italy
- Coordinates: 45°32′48.29″N 8°4′45.64″E
- Capacity: 5,707 (Basketball)
- Surface: Parquet

Construction
- Built: July 2007
- Opened: February 2009

Tenant
- Pallacanestro Biella (1983–present)

BiellaForum is an indoor sporting arena located in Biella, Italy. The capacity of the arena is for 5,707 people and was opened in February 2009. It is currently home only of the Pallacanestro Biella basketball team.

== See also ==
- List of indoor arenas in Italy
