= Rashad Wright =

American basketball player (born 1982)

Personal information
- Born: March 17, 1982 (age 44) Statesboro, Georgia, U.S.
- Listed height: 6 ft 2 in (1.88 m)
- Listed weight: 190 lb (86 kg)

Career information
- High school: Statesboro (Statesboro, Georgia)
- College: Georgia (2000–2004)
- NBA draft: 2004: 2nd round, 59th overall pick
- Drafted by: Indiana Pacers
- Playing career: 2004–2014
- Position: Point guard

Career history
- 2004–2005: Panionios
- 2005–2006: Hemofarm
- 2006–2007: Oostende
- 2007–2008: Efes Pilsen
- 2008–2010: Alba Berlin
- 2011: PAOK
- 2012: Chorale Roanne
- 2013–2014: Keravnos

Career highlights
- Belgian League champion (2007); German Cup winner (2009); SEC Defensive Player of the Year (2004); Second-team All-SEC (2004)
- Stats at Basketball Reference

Rashad Wright (born March 17, 1982) is an American former professional basketball player. He graduated from the University of Georgia and was selected by the Indiana Pacers with the final pick of the 2004 NBA draft. He played his whole professional career in Europe. He is currently an assistant coach and head JV coach at the 5a private school Holland Hall.
