= Predrag Šuput =

Serbian basketball player

Personal information
- Born: June 1, 1977 (age 49) Gospić, SR Croatia, SFR Yugoslavia
- Listed height: 2.00 m (6 ft 7 in)
- Listed weight: 120 kg (265 lb)

Career information
- NBA draft: 1999: undrafted
- Playing career: 2000–2013
- Position: Small forward

Career history
- 2000–2003: Spartak Subotica
- 2003–2004: NIS Vojvodina
- 2004–2006: Partizan
- 2006–2007: Hemofarm
- 2007–2012: Brose Baskets
- 2012–2013: Cedevita Zagreb

Career highlights
- 2× Serbian League champion (2005–2006); 3× German League champion (2010–2012); 2× German Cup winner (2011–2012); 3x All-German League Team (2009, 2010, 2011)

Predrag Šuput (Serbian Cyrillic: Предраг Шупут; born June 1, 1977) is a former Serbian professional basketball player. He is a 2.00 m (6 ft 7 in) tall small forward.

== Professional career ==
On 8 August 2012, he signed with KK Cedevita which played in the EuroLeague for the first time in club history.

== EuroLeague career statistics ==
Legend
GP	Games played	GS	Games started	MPG	Minutes per game
FG%	Field-goal percentage	3P%	3-point field-goal percentage	FT%	Free-throw percentage
RPG	Rebounds per game	APG	Assists per game	SPG	Steals per game
BPG	Blocks per game	PPG	Points per game	PIR	Performance index rating
**Bold**	Career high

Year	Team	GP	GS	MPG	FG%	3P%	FT%	RPG	APG	SPG	BPG	PPG	PIR
2005–06	Partizan	**14**	8	25.2	.426	**.389**	.773	3.9	1.4	**1.6**	.1	8.4	7.3
2007–08	Brose Baskets	13	**13**	**27.8**	.469	.378	.611	**4.3**	1.6	.8	.1	9.8	9.7
2010–11	Brose Baskets	9	9	21.4	**.487**	.304	.750	2.1	**1.7**	.9	.1	10.0	6.9
2011–12	Brose Baskets	10	3	22.6	.446	.300	**.900**	4.2	1.5	.8	**.2**	**10.9**	**10.3**
2012–13	Cedevita	10	8	22.6	.455	.316	.714	2.6	**1.7**	.2	.1	7.6	5.7
Career		56	41	24.6	.455	.345	.731	3.5	1.6	1.1	.1	9.3	8.0
