= Andrew Betts =

British basketball player (born 1977)

Andy Betts
Personal information
- Born: 11 May 1977 (age 49) Ashby-de-la-Zouch, Leicestershire, England, United Kingdom
- Listed height: 7 ft 1 in (2.16 m)
- Listed weight: 275 lb (125 kg)

Career information
- College: LIU Post (1994–1997); Long Beach State (1997–1998)
- NBA draft: 1998: 2nd round, 50th overall pick
- Drafted by: Charlotte Hornets
- Playing career: 1998–2012
- Position: Centre

Career history
- 1998–1999: Teamsystem Bologna
- 1999–2000: Bipop Carire Reggio Emilia
- 2000: Real Madrid
- 2000–2003: AEK Athens
- 2003–2005: TAU Cerámica
- 2005–2007: DKV Joventut
- 2007–2008: Cajasol Sevilla
- 2009–2010: Aris Thessaloniki
- 2010–2011: Budivelnyk Kyiv
- 2011–2012: Lagun Aro GBC

Career highlights
- FIBA EuroCup champion (2006); Liga ACB champion (2000); Spanish Cup winner (2004); Italian Super Cup (1998); Greek League champion (2002); Greek Cup winner (2001); Greek League All-Star (2003); Ukrainian League champion (2011); First-team All-Big West (1998)
- Stats at Basketball Reference

Andrew Richard Betts (born 11 May 1977) is a British retired basketball player who played professionally in Spain, Italy, Greece, and Ukraine.

== College career ==
After starting his career as a junior youth club player with the Leicester Riders, Betts played college basketball at C.W. Post Campus of Long Island University, from 1994 to 1997, and also later at Long Beach State University, from 1997 to 1998. He averaged 18.7 points and 10.1 rebounds per game, as a senior at Long Beach State.

== Professional career ==
Betts was selected in the second round of the 1998 NBA draft by the Charlotte Hornets with the 50th overall draft pick. He never appeared in the NBA.

Betts started his pro club career with Fortitudo Bologna in the Italian A League in the 1998–99 season. His European basketball career culminated in winning the EuroCup in 2006 with Spanish side Joventut Badalona and national league titles in Greece with AEK Athens and in Spain with Real Madrid.

== National team career ==
Betts debuted for the English national team in 1996, at age 19. He was named England's Young Player of the Year, and also England's Player of the Year twice. During a national team career which began in 1996, Betts made 62 appearances for both the senior English national team and the senior Great Britain national team. With Great Britain, he played at the 2009 FIBA EuroBasket before retiring from international basketball in 2011. His highest scoring performance was in 2003 where he scored 31 points as England beat the Czech Republic in a EuroBasket qualifying game.

== Personal life ==
Betts was married to Michelle, a former Long Beach State volleyball player who won the 1993 NCAA national championship. The couple met as students at Long Beach State. They have four children, including daughters Lauren and Sienna – both play basketball for UCLA – and sons Dylan and Ashton. The family lived in several Spanish cities during Betts's playing career before relocating to Colorado. Betts and Michelle have since divorced. He is the sporting ambassador for his home town club the Leicester Riders. He lives in Centennial, Colorado.
