= Britton Johnsen =

American basketball player (born 1979)

Personal information
- Born: July 8, 1979 (age 47) Salt Lake City, Utah, U.S.
- Listed height: 6 ft 10 in (2.08 m)
- Listed weight: 245 lb (111 kg)

Career information
- High school: Murray (Murray, Utah)
- College: Utah (1997–1998, 2000–2003)
- NBA draft: 2003: undrafted
- Playing career: 2003–2011
- Position: Small forward / power forward
- Number: 31, 32

Career history
- 2003: Orlando Magic
- 2003–2004: Fayetteville Patriots
- 2004: Orlando Magic
- 2004: Indiana Pacers
- 2004–2005: Idaho Stampede
- 2005–2006: Lucentum Alicante
- 2006: Panellinios
- 2006–2007: Pau-Orthez
- 2008: Bakersfield Jam
- 2008: Utah Flash
- 2008: Galatasaray Café Crown
- 2008–2009: PAOK Thessaloniki
- 2009–2010: Panellinios
- 2011: Quilmes de Mar del Plata

Career highlights
- All-NBDL Second Team (2004); MWC Player of the Year (2002); Second-team Parade All-American (1997); McDonald's All-American (1997); Utah Mr. Basketball (1997)
- Stats at NBA.com
- Stats at Basketball Reference

Britton Weaver Johnsen (born July 8, 1979) is an American retired professional basketball player who played briefly in the National Basketball Association (NBA). He graduated from Murray High School and the University of Utah. Born in Salt Lake City, his hometown is Murray, Utah. Johnsen is a member of the Church of Jesus Christ of Latter-day Saints.

== College career ==
Johnsen played college basketball with the University of Utah's Utah Utes.

== Professional career ==
Johnsen was selected with the #19 pick of the Continental Basketball Association (CBA) draft by the Gary Steelheads in 2003. He then played briefly for the Orlando Magic in the NBA in the 2003–04 NBA season averaging 2.1 points and 2.1 rebounds per game. He then played with the New Orleans Hornets during the 2004 NBA preseason and with the Indiana Pacers in the 2004–05 NBA season averaging 2.0 points and 1.7 rebounds per game.

He also played with the summer league squad of the Utah Jazz at the Rocky Mountain Revue and with the Jazz during their preseason training camp in the year 2008.

He also played in the NBA D-League with the Fayetteville Patriots, the Bakersfield Jam, and the Utah Flash and in the CBA with the Idaho Stampede.

=== Overseas ===
Johnsen also played overseas for several professional clubs. He moved to the Spanish ACB League club Etosa Alicante in 2005. He then moved to the Greek A1 League club Panellinios Athens in 2006.

In 2007, he joined the French Pro A League club Élan Béarnais Pau-Orthez. In 2008, he moved to the Turkish League club Galatasaray Café Crown. In 2009, he joined the Greek team PAOK Thessaloniki. A year later, he signed with Panellinios B.C. In 2011, he joined the Argentine team Quilmes de Mar del Plata.

== Sources ==
- NBA profile @ NBA.com
- Euroleague.net profile
- Basketpedya.com profile
- TSN.ca career transactions
- NBA D-League profile
