= Dwayne Broyles =

American basketball player (born 1982)

Personal information
- Born: July 10, 1982 (age 43) Canton, Ohio, U.S.
- Listed height: 6 ft 5 in (1.96 m)

Career information
- High school: Canton McKinley (Canton, Ohio)
- College: James Madison (2000–2004)
- NBA draft: 2004: undrafted
- Playing career: 2004–2014
- Position: Small forward

Career history
- 2004–2005: Šibenik
- 2005–2007: Zagreb
- 2007–2008: ASK Riga
- 2008–2012: Spirou Charleroi
- 2013–2014: Bnei Herzliya
- 2014: Spirou Charleroi

Career highlights
- 3× Belgian League champion (2009–2011); Belgian Cup winner (2009)

Dwayne Broyles (born July 10, 1982) is an American former professional basketball player who has played in the Euroleague, was an All-Star in four different European leagues and won three consecutive Belgium Championships.

Broyles is currently an executive of a sports firm that represented NBA players and some of the best American players in Europe. Broyles is also a trainer and entrepreneur.

== Career ==
Though Broyles was a standout player at James Madison University and an all-conference player, Broyles went undrafted by the NBA. Dwayne Broyles then started his career in the eastern European bloc, countries like Croatia and Latvia playing for three teams before being recognized for his good play and moving to historic Belgian Champion Club Spirou Charleroi. For the 2012–13 season, Broyles signed with Orléans Loiret Basket, but before the season started he got injured. He later made an agreement with the club to leave and get surgery on his knee. Broyles had his surgery performed by the renown Dr. James Andrews. In November 2013, he signed a two-month deal with Bnei Herzliya. On February 21, 2014 Broyles returned to Spirou Charleroi for the rest of the season. On October 31, 2016, Broyles retired from basketball.
