= Mareks Jurevičus =

Latvian basketball player (born 1985)

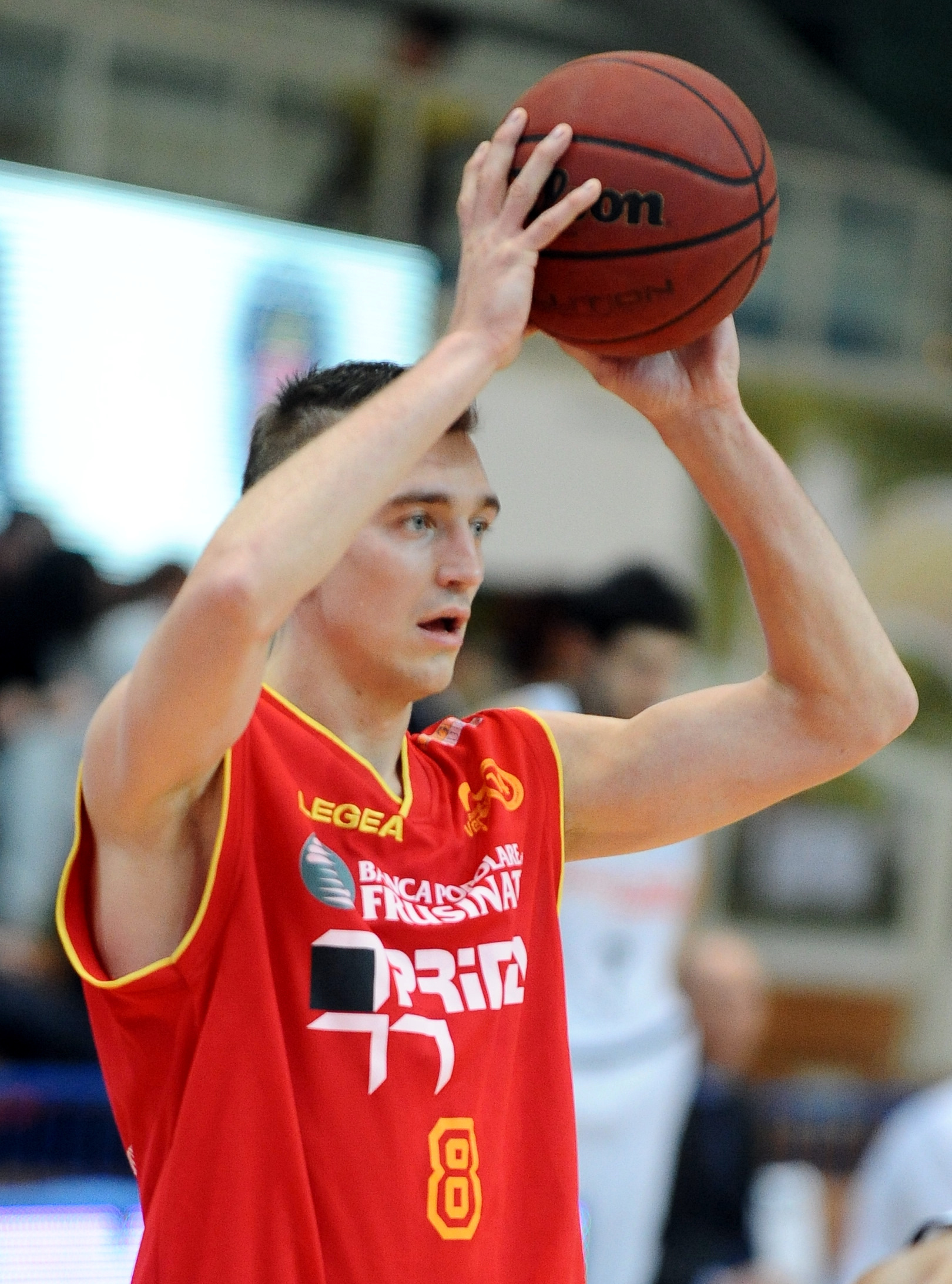

No. 18 – BK Ventspils
- Position: Shooting guard / small forward
- League: LEBL

Personal information
- Born: January 17, 1985 (age 41) Liepāja, Latvia
- Listed height: 1.98 m (6 ft 6 in)
- Listed weight: 86 kg (190 lb)

Career information
- College: Liepājas 1. vidusskola

Career history
- 2001–2008: Liepājas Lauvas
- 2008–2010: BK Ventspils
- 2010: Liepājas Lauvas
- 2010–2011: Tezenis Verona
- 2011–2012: Ostuni Basket
- 2012–2013: Prima Veroli
- 2013: Elan Chalon
- 2013–2014: Liepāja/Triobet
- 2014: MBC Mykolaiv
- 2014–2015: Liepāja/Triobet
- 2015–2016: Mureș
- 2016–2018: Liepāja/Triobet
- 2018: BK Ventspils
- 2019: BK Liepāja
- 2019–2020: BC Tallinna Kalev

Career highlights
- Latvian Basketball League champion (2009); Latvian Basketball League Playoffs MVP (2009)

Mareks Jurevičus (born 17 January 1985) is a Latvian professional basketball player, who plays the Shooting guard, Small forward position. He's currently playing for the France ProA club Elan Chalon.

ES Chalon-Sur-Saône (ProA) added to their roster 28-year-old Latvian ex-international swingman Mareks Jurevicus (198–86 kg-85). He played last season at Prima Veroli in Italian Lega Due Gold. In 28 games he had 14.7ppg, 3.9rpg, 1.5apg and 1.4spg. A very spectacular season in his career as he was named to Eurobasket.com Italian Lega2 All-Bosmans Team. The previous (11-12) season Jurevicus played at Assi Basket Ostuni (Lega2) in Italy. In 29 games he recorded 13.6ppg, 4.2rpg, 1.7apg and 1.1spg that season. The most of previous (10-11) season he spent at Tezenis (Lega Due Gold) in Italian league. In 20 games he recorded 12.3ppg, 4.6rpg, 1.8apg and 1.7spg. Jurevicus also played at Liepaja/Triobet (LBL) in Latvian league that season. In 8 games he recorded 22.1ppg, 4.6rpg, 4.9apg and 2.6spg. He also played 10 games in Baltic League where he recorded also remarkable stats: 19.0ppg, 5.3rpg and 2.6apg. In 2009-10 season Jurevicus played at BK Ventspils (LBL) in Latvian league. The team played in three different competitions that year, and he was exposed to basketball on different levels. In 15 LBL games he recorded 13.7ppg, 4.7rpg and 2.5apg. He helped them to make it to the final. Great season indeed as he was named to Eurobasket.com All-Latvian League 2nd Team, All-Star Game and All-Domestic Players Team. Jurevicus also played 2 games in Eurocup where he recorded 7.0ppg, 3.5rpg and 2.5apg. He also played 22 games in Baltic League where he recorded 11.1ppg, 4.0rpg, 2.7apg and 1.3spg. He contributed to his team making it to the semifinals. Jurevicus won Latvian League championship title in 2009. He was also a member of Latvian international program for some years. Jurevicus played for Latvian Senior National Team between 2008 and 2011 and previously for U20 National Team between 2004 and 2005. He also represented Latvia at the European Championships in Lithuania two years ago. His stats at that event were 4 games: 0.8ppg. Jurevicus is a very experienced player. On Jurevicus: A very good outside shooter, even from long distance, has leadership on the court.

He has represented Latvia national team in EuroBasket 2011.

== Pro clubs ==
- (Latvia) BK Liepājas lauvas
- (Latvia) BK Ventspils
- Latvia national basketball team
- (Italy) Tezenis Verona
- (Italy) Ostuni Basket
- (Italy) Prima Veroli
- (France) Elan Chalon
- (Latvia) BK Liepājas lauvas
- (Ukraine) MBC Mykolaiv
- (Romania) BC Mures
