= Blagota Sekulić =

Montenegrin basketball player and coach

Zenit Saint Petersburg
- Title: Assistant coach
- League: VTB United League

Personal information
- Born: March 14, 1982 (age 44) Titograd, SFR Yugoslavia
- Listed height: 6 ft 10.75 in (2.10 m)
- Listed weight: 256 lb (116 kg)

Career information
- NBA draft: 2004: undrafted
- Playing career: 1998–2019
- Position: Power forward / center
- Coaching career: 2019–present

Career history

Playing
- 1998–2002: Budućnost Podgorica
- 2002–2003: Partizan
- 2003–2004: AEK Athens
- 2004–2006: Maroussi
- 2006–2007: PAOK
- 2007–2008: Real Madrid
- 2008–2009: Aris
- 2009–2010: Alba Berlin
- 2010–2011: Vanoli Cremona
- 2011–2012: Murcia
- 2012–2014: Canarias
- 2014: Fenerbahçe
- 2014–2016: Canarias
- 2016–2018: Fuenlabrada
- 2018–2019: Gipuzkoa Basket

Coaching
- 2019–present: Montenegro (assistant)
- 2022–2025: Murcia (assistant)
- 2026–present: Zenit Saint Petersburg (assistant)

Career highlights
- All-EuroCup Second Team (2010); EuroCup champion (2007); Liga ACB champion (2007); 4× YUBA League champion (1999–2001, 2003); Yugoslav Cup winner (2001)
Medals
Men's basketball
Representing Montenegro
Games of the Small States of Europe
Gold medal – first place	2015 Reykjavík

Blagota Sekulić (Cyrillic: Благота Секулић; born March 14, 1982) is a Montenegrin professional basketball coach and former player. Standing at 2.10 m (6 ft 10 1/2 in), he played both power forward and center positions.

== Professional career ==
In his professional career, Sekulić has played with Budućnost Podgorica and Partizan in his country and won 4 Yugoslav Basketball League championships then played for AEK Athens, Maroussi, PAOK, Aris in Greece, Real Madrid, Murcia and CB Canarias in Spain, Alba Berlin in Germany and Vanoli Cremona in Italy.

In February 2014, he signed with the Turkish club Fenerbahçe Ülker for the rest of the 2013–14 season. In the summer of 2014 he returned to Canarias.

On July 14, 2016, Sekulić signed with Spanish team Montakit Fuenlabrada. On September 17, 2018, Sekulić signed a one-year deal with Delteco GBC of the Liga ACB.

== National team career ==
Sekulić played for the Montenegro national basketball team at the EuroBasket 2013.
