= Teramo Basket =

Coordinates: 42°40′10.84″N 13°41′14.55″E

Teramo
- Leagues: Lega Basket Serie A
- Founded: 1960; 65 years ago
- Dissolved: 2012; 13 years ago
- History: Teramo Basket; 1960–2012
- Arena: PalaScapriano
- Capacity: 3,500
- Location: Teramo, Italy
- Retired numbers: 2 (8, 20)
Home	Away	Third

Teramo Basket was a professional basketball club that is based in Teramo, Italy. Established in 1960, Teramo played in the Lega Basket Serie A (LBA), Italy's top league, for 10 years before they were moved to the Serie B. The team played at PalaScapriano.

In 2012 the team was dissolved after financial problems.

== History ==
The club was founded by Carlo Antonetti in 1973 under the name AICS (Association of Italian Culture and Sports) Teramo. After several championships played at regional level and successful youth teams, in the 1992-93 season Teramo Basket finally accomplished its first promotion to the national championship series C1. It represented an established basketball team playing in Serie A, the Italian professional basketball league, for 10 seasons consecutively. It ranked #3 in 2009 Italian league enabling the team to play the Eurocup in 2010. Due to a heavy situation of bankruptcy the team folded in July 2012 and disappeared from any basketball league. Teramo Basket had been an important launch pad for both Italian and American players such as Clay Tucker and Jaycee Carroll.

== Notable players ==
- (Italy) Mario Boni 1 season: '03-'04
- (Italy) Stefano Rajola 3 seasons: '03-'06
- (The Bahamas) Ian Lockhart 1 season: '03-'04
- (Canada) Jesse Young
- (Croatia) Krešimir Lončar 1 season: '03-'04
- (Dominican Republic) Jack Michael Martínez 1 season: '06-'07
- (Georgia (country)) Nikoloz Tskitishvili 1 season: '07-'08
- (Latvia) Kristaps Janicenoks 1 season: '06-'07
- (United States) Doremus Bennerman 1 season: '03-'04
- (United States) Jaycee Carroll 1 season: '08-'09
- (United States) Keith Carter 1 season: '03-'04
- (United States) Joe Crispin 1 season: '05-'06
- (United States) Joshua Davis 1 season: 2010-'11
- (United States) Drake Diener 1 season: 2009-'11
- (United States) Tyrone Grant 1 season: '03-'04
- (United States) Devin Green 1 season: '07-'08
- (United States) Anthony Grundy 1 season: '06-'07
- (United States) Mike Hall 1 season: 2010
- (United States) Delonte Holland 1 season: '05-'06
- (United States) Leroy Hurd 1 season: '06-'07
- (United States) Trey Johnson pre-season: '11
- (United States) Bobby Jones 1 season: '09-'10
- (United States) David Moss 1 season: '08-'09
- (United States) Pervis Pasco 1 season: '05-'06
- (United States) Roger Powell 1 season: '07-'08
- (United States) Brooks Sales 1 season: '04-'05
- (United States) Shawnelle Scott 1 season: '03-'04
- (United States) Jamel Thomas 1 season: '04-'05
- (United States) Clay Tucker 1 season: '07-'08
- (United States) Tyson Wheeler 1 season: '04-'05
- (United States) Duane Woodward 1 season: '06-'07

== Sponsorship names ==
Through the years, due to sponsorship deals, it had been also known as:

- Sanic Teramo (2002–03)
- Navigo.it Teramo (2004–06)
- Siviglia Wear Teramo (2006–08)
- Bancatercas Teramo (2008–present)
