= Pallacanestro Biella =

- Leagues: Serie A2
- Founded: 1994
- History: A. S. Pallacanestro Biella, 1994-present
- Arena: HYPE Forum
- Capacity: 5,707
- Location: Biella, Piedmont, Italy
- Team colors: Red, Dark Blue, White
- President: Massimo Angelico
- Head coach: Michele Carrea
- Website: PallacanestroBiella.it (in Italian)
Home	Away

Pallacanestro Biella, known as Angelico Biella for sponsorship reasons, is an Italian professional basketball club based in Biella, Piedmont. It plays in the second division Serie A2 as of the 2015–16 season.

For past club sponsorship names, see sponsorship names.

== History ==
Associazione Sportiva Pallacanestro Biella was formed in 1994 from the merger of two local sides, Biella Basket Club and Amici del Basket Biella. It started playing in the Italian fourth division, moving up to the second division by 1999. A team coached by Marco Crespi and containing players like Corey Brewer (basketball, born 1975) and Antonio Granger helped Biella reach the first division Serie A in 2001 (thirty years after another Biella side, Libertas, had been relegated). The team had lower mid-table finishes the next three years to stay in the league before the arrival of Angelico as a main sponsor gave the club a new dimension. It reached the Serie A playoff quarterfinals in 2006 and finished sixth the next season to earn its second playoff run. The 2008-09 season saw the club do one better, beating upsetting Lottomatica Roma in the quarterfinals to reach the semifinals for the first time. Though they lost in the semifinals, it was enough to allow the club to play in Europe for the first time, in the second tier Eurocup.

After flirting with the relegation spots the next two seasons and mid-table finish in 2011-12, Biella's twelve-year tenure in the top flight was ended with the club's relegation at the end of the 2012-13 season when it placed last. Though it has stayed in the second division since (as of the 2015-16 season), Biella won their first trophy in 2014, with the second division cup filed in the trophy cabinet. The cup win was enough to earn Biella a place in the 2014–15 EuroChallenge despite being the only second division side in the competition.

== Notable players ==
- Set a club record or won an individual award as a professional player.
- Played at least one official international match for his senior national team at any time.

- (Italy) Pietro Aradori
- (Italy) Marco Carraretto 2 seasons: '02-'04
- (Italy) Daniele Cinciarini 1 season: '07-'08
- (Italy) Fabio Di Bella 3 seasons: '02-'05
- (Italy) Luca Garri 1 season: '05-'06
- (Italy) Matteo Soragna 4 seasons: '00-'04
- (Australia) Stephen Black 1 season: '04-'05
- (Bosnia and Herzegovina) J. R. Bremer 1 season: '05-'06
- (Switzerland) Thabo Sefolosha 1 season: '05-'06, (#14 NBA draft pick, 2006)
- (Germany) Pascal Roller 1 season: '06-'07
- (Germany) Sven Schultze 1 season: '09-'10
- (United Kingdom) Carl Wheatle
- (United States) Mario Austin 1 season: '04-'05
- (United States) Michael Batiste 1 season: '01-'02
- (United States) Cookie Belcher 4 seasons: '01-'05
- (United States) Troy Bell 1 season: '07-'08
- (United States) Joseph Blair 1 season: '98-'99
- (United States) Corey L. Brewer 1 season: '00-'01
- (United States) Erik Daniels 1 season: '06-'07
- (United States) Malik Dixon 1 season: '01-'02
- (United States) Reece Gaines 1 season: '06-'07
- (United States) James Gist 1 season: '08-'09 (#57 NBA draft pick, 2008)
- (United States) Antonio Granger 1 season: '00-'01
- (United States) Kyle Hill 1 season: '03-'04
- (United States) Jacob Jaacks 2 seasons: '02-'03, '04-'05
- (United States) DeMarco Johnson 1 season: '03-'04
- (United States) Fred Jones 1 season: '09-'10
- (United States) Ricky Minard 1 season: '04-'05
- (United States) Norman Nolan 1 season: '99-'00
- (United States) Kevin Rankin 2 seasons: '00-'02
- (United States) Brooks Sales 2 seasons: '02-'04
- (United States) Jamel Thomas 2 seasons: '02-'03, '06-'07
- (United States) Damon Williams 1 season: '05-'06

== Notable coaches ==
- (Italy) Marco Crespi 1 season: '00-'01

== Sponsorship names ==
Throughout the years, due to sponsorship, the club has been known as:

- ING Sviluppo (1994-1998)
- Fila Biella (1998–2001)
- Lauretana Biella (2001–2005)
- Angelico Biella [Domestically] (2005–present)

- Lauretana Biella [European competition] (2009–10)
- Eurotrend Biella [Italian cup] (2014)
- Bonprix Biella [European competition] (2014-15)
