= 2010–11 Real Madrid Baloncesto season =

Real Madrid Baloncesto
2010–11 season
- President: Florentino Pérez
- Head coach: Ettore Messina (until 4 March); Emanuele Molin (from 4 March)
- Liga ACB: Semi-finals
- Euroleague: 4th
- Copa del Rey: Runners-up
- Supercopa de España: Semi-finals
- Scoring leader: Sergio Llull (11.1 ppg)
- Highest home attendance: 12,093 vs Power Electronics Valencia (7 April 2011)
- Lowest home attendance: 4,037 vs Spirou Basket (23 December 2010)

The 2010–11 season was Real Madrid's 28th season in Liga ACB. The club played all home games this season at the Caja Mágica, moving from Palacio Vistalegre, their previous home for six seasons.

This article shows player statistics and all matches (official and friendly) that the club played during the 2010–11 season.

== Players ==
=== Depth chart ===
Pos.	Starting 5	Bench 1	Bench 2
C	Ante Tomić	D'or Fischer	Mirza Begić
PF	Felipe Reyes	Nikola Mirotić
SF	Carlos Suárez	Novica Veličković
SG	Sergio Llull	Clay Tucker	Sergi Vidal
PG	Pablo Prigioni	Sergio Rodríguez

=== Transfers ===
==== In ====
N	P	Nat.	Name	Age	Moving from	Source
34	PF	(Spain)	Pablo Aguilar	21	CB Granada	Realmadrid.com
16	C	(Slovenia)	Mirza Begić	25	(Lithuania) BC Žalgiris	Realmadrid.com
21	C	(United States)	D'or Fischer	28	(Israel) Maccabi Tel Aviv	Realmadrid.com
11	G	(United States)	Josh Fisher	29	Bizkaia Bilbao Basket	Realmadrid.com
12	F/C	(Spain)	Nikola Mirotić	19	Palencia Baloncesto	Realmadrid.com
13	PG	(Spain)	Sergio Rodríguez	24	(United States) New York Knicks	Realmadrid.com
8	F	(Spain)	Carlos Suárez	24	Asefa Estudiantes	Realmadrid.com
24	G	(United States)	Clay Tucker	30	DKV Joventut	Realmadrid.com

==== Out ====
N	P	Nat.	Name	Age	Moving to	Source
34	PF	(Spain)	Pablo Aguilar	21	CAI Zaragoza	Basketzaragoza.net
21	G	(United States)	Morris Almond	25	(Italy) Scavolini Pesaro	Victorialibertas.it
22	SG	(United States)	Louis Bullock	34	Cajasol	Baloncestosevilla.com
21	F	(Montenegro)	Vladimir Dašić	22	Gran Canaria 2014	CBGrancanaria.net
11	PG	(United States)	Josh Fisher	30	Bizkaia Bilbao Basket	ACB.com
15	F	(Spain)	Jorge Garbajosa	33	Unicaja	Unicajabaloncesto.com
6	SF	(United States)	Travis Hansen	32	(Russia) Khimki Moscow Region	BCKhimki.com
8	PG	(Serbia)	Marko Jarić	31	(Italy) Montepaschi Siena	Menssanabasket.it
13	SG	(Lithuania)	Rimantas Kaukėnas	33	(Italy) Montepaschi Siena	Menssanabasket.it
7	C	(Lithuania)	Darjuš Lavrinovič	30	(Turkey) Fenerbahçe Ülker	Fenerbahce.org
	Head coach	(Italy)	Ettore Messina	51		Realmadrid.com
12	C	(Belgium)	Tomas van den Spiegel	32	(Italy) Olimpia Milano	Olimpiamilano.com

=== Statistics ===
Legend
GP	Games played	GS	Games started	MPG	Minutes per game
FG%	Field-goal percentage	3FG%	3-point field-goal percentage	FT%	Free-throw percentage
RPG	Rebounds per game	APG	Assists per game	SPG	Steals per game
BPG	Blocks per game	PPG	Points per game	PIR	PIR per game

==== ACB season ====
#	Player	GP	GS	MPG	FG%	3FG%	FT%	RPG	APG	SPG	BPG	PPG	EFF
16	Mirza Begić	9		06:23	.565		.727	1.1	0.2	0	0.7	3.8	3.4
21	D'or Fischer	31	9	18:41	.593		.804	4.6	0.6	0.3	1.6	5.7	8.5
11	Josh Fisher	3		03:44			.500	0.3	0.7	0.3	0	0.3	1.3
15	Jorge Garbajosa	16	1	11:08	.397	.278	.600	1.7	0.3	0.4	0.1	3.9	3.9
23	Sergio Llull	29	27	26:27	.401	.397	.803	1.7	2.9	0.9	0.2	11.1	10.3
12	Nikola Mirotić	26		16:35	.524	.421	.889	3.8	0.5	0.7	0.3	7.9	8.8
5	Pablo Prigioni	22	14	23:47	.414	.392	.846	2.5	4.2	1.3	0.1	6.1	9.7
9	Felipe Reyes	30	27	19:40	.439	.222	.789	5.2	1.1	0.7	0.3	9.3	11.2
7	Jorge Sanz	1		03:34				0	0	0	0	0	1.0
13	Sergio Rodríguez	28	15	18:49	.390	.308	.857	1.3	2.7	0.7	0.1	6.2	5.2
8	Carlos Suárez	30	26	26:28	.476	.464	.785	4.8	1.8	0.8	0.2	10.1	14.4
4	Ante Tomić	29	23	19:47	.586	.000	.658	4.2	1.0	0.6	0.6	10.2	10.9
24	Clay Tucker	31	7	23:05	.367	.349	.796	1.9	1.7	0.9	0.3	8.9	5.6
14	Novica Veličković	27	6	11:04	.352	.063	.742	2.7	0.7	0.4	0.1	3.2	3.3
20	Sergi Vidal	24		08:26	.423	.316	.600	0.4	0.5	0.2	0	1.3	1.5

Updated: 26 April 2011

==== Euroleague ====
#	Player	GP	GS	MPG	FG%	3FG%	FT%	RPG	APG	SPG	BPG	PPG	EFF
6	Víctor Arteaga	1		03:07	.333			0	0	0	1.0	2.0	–1.0
16	Mirza Begić	5		05:47	.667		.500	0.6	0	0.2	0.2	3.4	1.8
21	D'or Fischer	21	2	19:00	.577		.862	6.1	0.5	0.6	1.6	6.5	11.2
11	Josh Fisher	2		02:02	.000	.000		0.5	0	0	0	0	–1.0
15	Jorge Garbajosa	11	1	16:08	.422	.345	.786	2.7	0.3	0.6	0.5	5.4	6.5
23	Sergio Llull	21	20	27:36	.400	.345	.839	2.2	3.1	0.8	0.1	11.5	10.7
12	Nikola Mirotić	18		14:34	.535	.444	.846	3.2	0.6	0.4	0.5	7.0	8.7
5	Pablo Prigioni	16	11	25:21	.391	.358	.789	2.6	3.3	1.4	0	5.5	8.4
9	Felipe Reyes	19	19	18:53	.414	.222	.828	5.2	0.8	0.4	0.3	8.4	9.1
13	Sergio Rodríguez	16	10	19:32	.442	.200	.938	2.0	3.3	0.6	0	6.9	7.6
8	Carlos Suárez	21	19	23:27	.368	.324	.805	4.3	1.7	0.6	0.1	6.7	9.5
4	Ante Tomić	21	20	20:40	.503		.689	5.2	1.0	0.6	0.6	9.7	10.4
24	Clay Tucker	21	1	23:51	.377	.296	.759	2.3	1.8	0.6	0.2	9.3	6.0
14	Novica Veličković	18	2	12:12	.418	.333	.409	2.9	0.4	0.2	0.2	3.2	3.3
20	Sergi Vidal	11		06:30	.313	.222	.667	1.0	0.2	0.3	0	1.5	1.5

Updated: 26 April 2011

=== Awards ===
ACB Weekly MVP

Week	Player	Efficiency
4	(Spain) Felipe Reyes	34
10	(Spain) Felipe Reyes (2)	28
34	(United States) D'or Fischer	33

ACB Player of the Month

Month	Weeks	Player	Efficiency	Source
October	1–5	(Spain) Carlos Suárez	22.4	

ACB Coach of the Month

Month	Weeks	Coach	Source
January	14–19	(Italy) Ettore Messina	

Euroleague Weekly MVP

Round	Game	Player	Ranking
Top 16	3	(United States) D'or Fischer	30
Quarterfinals	3	(United States) D'or Fischer	27

Euroleague Rising Star

Year	Player	Source
2010–11	(Spain) Nikola Mirotić	

Last updated: 29 March 2011.
Source: ACB.com, Euroleague.net

== Competitions ==
=== Overall ===
Competition	Started round	Final position / round	First match	Last match
Spanish Supercup	Semifinals	4th	24 September 2010	24 September 2010
Liga ACB	—	Semi-finals	2 October 2010	2 June 2011
Euroleague	Regular season	4th	18 October 2010	8 May 2011
Copa del Rey	Quarterfinals	Runners-up	10 February 2011	13 February 2011

=== Liga ACB ===
==== Standings ====
#	Teams	GP	W	L	PF	PA
1	Regal FC Barcelona	34	27	7	2614	2245
2	Real Madrid	34	26	8	2629	2401
3	Power Electronics Valencia	34	24	10	2570	2414

Last updated: 15 May 2011
Source: Realmadrid.com

==== Results summary ====
Overall						Home					Away				
Pld	W	L	PF	PA	PD	W	L	PF	PA	PD	W	L	PF	PA	PD
34	26	8	2629	2401	+228	17	0	1374	1144	+230	9	8	1255	1257	−2

Last updated: 15 May 2011
Source: Realmadrid.com

==== Results by round ====
Round	1	2	3	4	5	6	7	8	9	10	11	12	13	14	15	16	17	18	19	20	21	22	23	24	25	26	27	28	29	30	31	32	33	34
Ground	A	H	A	H	A	H	A	H	A	H	H	A	A	H	H	A	H	H	A	H	A	A	H	A	H	A	H	A	H	A	H	A	H	A
Result	W	W	W	W	L	W	W	W	L	W	W	W	L	W	W	W	W	W	W	W	L	L	W	W	W	L	W	W	W	L	W	L	W	W
Position	8	3	2	1	5	3	3	2	3	2	1	1	2	2	2	2	2	2	2	2	2	2	2	2	2	2	2	2	2	2	2	2	2	2

Updated to match(es) played on 15 May 2011. Source: Realmadrid.com
A = Away; H = Home; W = Win; D = Draw; L = Loss

=== Euroleague ===
==== Regular season Group B ====
	Team	Pld	W	L	PF	PA	Diff	Tie-break
1	(Greece) Olympiacos Piraeus	10	7	3	805	730	+75	
2	(Spain) Real Madrid	10	6	4	734	662	+72	
3	(Spain) Unicaja	10	5	5	749	759	−10	1–1, +15
4	(Italy) Virtus Roma	10	5	5	733	770	−37	1–1, −15
5	(Germany) Brose Baskets	10	4	6	714	739	−25	
6	(Belgium) Spirou Basket	10	3	7	691	766	−75	

Last updated: 23 December 2010
Source: Euroleague.net

==== Top 16 Group G ====
	Team	Pld	W	L	PF	PA	Diff	Tie-break
1	(Spain) Real Madrid	6	5	1	460	423	+37	
2	(Italy) Montepaschi Siena	6	4	2	452	423	+29	
3	(Turkey) Efes Pilsen Istanbul	6	2	4	426	455	−29	
4	(Serbia) Partizan Belgrade	6	1	5	389	426	−37	

Last updated: 4 March 2011
Source: Euroleague.net

==== Quarterfinals ====
Team #1	Agg.	Team #2	Game 1	Game 2	Game 3	Game 4	Game 5
Real Madrid (Spain)	3 – 2	(Spain) Power Electronics Valencia	71 – 65	75 – 81	75 – 66	72 – 81	66 – 58

Last updated: 7 April 2011
Source: Euroleague.net

==== Final Four ====
Semifinals; 6 May
(Greece) Panathinaikos BC	77
(Italy) Montepaschi Siena	69
(Israel) Maccabi Tel Aviv	82
(Spain) Real Madrid	63

Final; 8 May
(Greece) Panathinaikos BC	78
(Israel) Maccabi Tel Aviv	70
Third place
(Italy) Montepaschi Siena	80
(Spain) Real Madrid	62

Last updated: 8 May 2011
Source: Euroleague.net

=== Copa del Rey ===
Quarterfinals; 10 & 11 February		Semifinals; 12 February		Final; 13 February
BR Valladolid	60
PE Valencia	83	PE Valencia	59
Real Madrid	78	Real Madrid	69
Gran Canaria 2014	72			Real Madrid	60
Bilbao Bizkaia Basket	74			Regal FC Barcelona	68
Caja Laboral	76	Caja Laboral	73
Regal FC Barcelona	86	Regal FC Barcelona	92
DKV Joventut	66

Last updated: 13 February 2010
Source: Copadelreyacb.com

== Matches ==
=== Liga ACB ===
2010–11 game log
Total: 26–8 (Home: 17–0; Road: 9–8)
September: 1–0 (home: 0–0; road: 1–0)

Game	Date	Team	Score	High points	High rebounds	High assists	Location Attendance	Record
1	30 September	@ Asefa Estudiantes	W 84–79 Archived 1 October 2010 at the Wayback Machine	Carlos Suárez (21)	D'or Fischer (8)	Sergio Llull (4)	Palacio de Deportes de la Comunidad de Madrid; 13,000	1–0

October: 3–1 (home: 2–0; road: 1–1)

Game	Date	Team	Score	High points	High rebounds	High assists	Location Attendance	Record
2	10 October	Assignia Manresa	W 81–63 Archived 3 March 2016 at the Wayback Machine	Clay Tucker (16)	D'or Fischer (13)	Carlos Suárez (4)	Caja Mágica; 7,143	2–0
3	16 October	@ Bizkaia Bilbao Basket	W 75–73 Archived 18 July 2014 at the Wayback Machine	Ante Tomić (14)	Ante Tomić (9)	Sergio Rodríguez (4)	Bizkaia Arena; 8,534	3–0
4	23 October	Power Electronics Valencia	W 75–63 Archived 3 March 2016 at the Wayback Machine	Clay Tucker (18)	Felipe Reyes (13)	Felipe Reyes (6)	Caja Mágica; 6,154	4–0
5	30 October	@ Meridiano Alicante	L 67–78 Archived 18 July 2014 at the Wayback Machine	Carlos Suárez (16)	Carlos Suárez (9)	Sergio Rodríguez, Carlos Suárez (2)	Centro de Tecnificación; 4,270	4–1

November: 3–1 (home: 2–0; road: 1–1)

Game	Date	Team	Score	High points	High rebounds	High assists	Location Attendance	Record
6	7 November	Lagun Aro GBC	W 83–53 Archived 3 March 2016 at the Wayback Machine	Sergio Llull, Sergio Rodríguez (14)	Novica Veličković (9)	Novica Veličković (4)	Telefónica Arena Madrid; 6,452	5–1
7	13 November	@ DKV Joventut	W 72–64 Archived 6 March 2016 at the Wayback Machine	Sergio Llull (17)	D'or Fischer (11)	Sergio Rodríguez (4)	Palau Olímpic; 8,968	6–1
8	21 November	Blancos de Rueda Valladolid	W 87–82 Archived 3 December 2016 at the Wayback Machine	Carlos Suárez, Ante Tomić (16)	Carlos Suárez, Ante Tomić (7)	Sergio Llull, Clay Tucker (5)	Caja Mágica; 6,352	7–1
9	28 November	@ Gran Canaria 2014	L 70–59 Archived 4 March 2016 at the Wayback Machine	Felipe Reyes, Clay Tucker (13)	D'or Fischer (8)	Sergio Llull (4)	Centro Insular; 4,963	7–2

December: 3–1 (home: 2–0; road: 1–1)

Game	Date	Team	Score	High points	High rebounds	High assists	Location Attendance	Record
10	4 December	Unicaja	W 88–72 Archived 18 July 2014 at the Wayback Machine	Felipe Reyes (18)	Felipe Reyes (11)	Sergio Llull, Sergio Rodríguez (6)	Caja Mágica; 6,690	8–2
11	12 December	CAI Zaragoza	W 84–65 Archived 4 March 2016 at the Wayback Machine	Clay Tucker (16)	Ante Tomić (5)	Pablo Prigioni (9)	Caja Mágica; 5,638	9–2
12	18 December	@ Caja Laboral	W 72–67 Archived 18 July 2014 at the Wayback Machine	Felipe Reyes (21)	Carlos Suárez (7)	Pablo Prigioni (4)	Fernando Buesa Arena; 9,700	10–2
13	30 December	@ Regal FC Barcelona	L 75–95 Archived 4 March 2016 at the Wayback Machine	Sergio Rodríguez, Clay Tucker (13)	D'or Fischer (10)	Sergio Rodríguez (4)	Palau Blaugrana; 7,411	10–3

January: 6–0 (home: 4–0; road: 2–0)

Game	Date	Team	Score	High points	High rebounds	High assists	Location Attendance	Record
14	2 January	CB Granada	W 84–57 Archived 4 March 2016 at the Wayback Machine	Nikola Mirotić (17)	D'or Fischer, Ante Tomić (6)	Pablo Prigioni (5)	Caja Mágica; 4,415	11–3
15	9 January	ViveMenorca	W 95–84 Archived 4 March 2016 at the Wayback Machine	Sergio Llull, Carlos Suárez (18)	Novica Veličković (4)	Sergio Llull (6)	Caja Mágica; 4,980	12–3
16	13 January	@ Cajasol	W 89–75 Archived 18 July 2014 at the Wayback Machine	Clay Tucker (26)	Nikola Mirotić (6)	Pablo Prigioni (5)	Palacio Municipal San Pablo; 6,800	13–3
17	16 January	Baloncesto Fuenlabrada	W 76–75 Archived 3 March 2016 at the Wayback Machine	Nikola Mirotić (19)	Nikola Mirotić (7)	Sergio Rodríguez (6)	Caja Mágica; 5,579	14–3
18	22 January	Asefa Estudiantes	W 82–61 Archived 7 March 2016 at the Wayback Machine	Sergio Llull (17)	Carlos Suárez (8)	Pablo Prigioni (6)	Caja Mágica; 8,034	15–3
19	30 January	@ Assignia Manresa	W 62–61 Archived 18 July 2014 at the Wayback Machine	Nikola Mirotić, Clay Tucker (10)	Felipe Reyes (9)	Pablo Prigioni (4)	Pavelló Nou Congost; 4,300	16–3

February: 1–2 (home: 1–0; road: 0–2)

Game	Date	Team	Score	High points	High rebounds	High assists	Location Attendance	Record
20	5 February	Bizkaia Bilbao Basket	W 76–72 Archived 5 March 2016 at the Wayback Machine	Pablo Prigioni (14)	Carlos Suárez (7)	Sergio Llull (7)	Caja Mágica; 6,123	17–3
21	19 February	@ Power Electronics Valencia	L 52–59 Archived 4 March 2016 at the Wayback Machine	Carlos Suárez (18)	Nikola Mirotić (7)	Pablo Prigioni (4)	Pabellón Fuente San Luis; 8,900	17–4
22	26 February	@ Blancos de Rueda Valladolid	L 65–74 Archived 5 March 2016 at the Wayback Machine	Sergio Rodríguez (13)	Novica Veličković (7)	Sergio Llull (5)	Polideportivo Pisuerga; 6,020	17–5

March: 4–1 (home: 3–0; road: 1–1)

Game	Date	Team	Score	High points	High rebounds	High assists	Location Attendance	Record
23	5 March	DKV Joventut	W 78–60 Archived 6 March 2016 at the Wayback Machine	Sergio Llull, Ante Tomić (13)	Felipe Reyes (9)	Sergio Llull (6)	Caja Mágica; 5,886	18–5
24	10 March	@ Lagun Aro GBC	W 88–78 (OT) Archived 18 July 2014 at the Wayback Machine	Sergio Llull (21)	Nikola Mirotić, Felipe Reyes, Carlos Suárez (6)	Pablo Prigioni (10)	San Sebastián Arena 2016; 6,790	19–5
25	13 March	Meridiano Alicante	W 80–62 Archived 4 March 2016 at the Wayback Machine	Mirza Begić, Nikola Mirotić, Ante Tomić (12)	Nikola Mirotić, Carlos Suárez (7)	Sergio Llull, Pablo Prigioni, Sergio Rodríguez (4)	Caja Mágica; 4,996	20–5
26	19 March	@ Unicaja	L 68–69 (OT) Archived 4 March 2016 at the Wayback Machine	Pablo Prigioni (21)	Nikola Mirotić (9)	Pablo Prigioni (4)	Jose Maria Martin Carpena Arena; 11,000	20–6
27	26 March	Gran Canaria 2014	W 74–73 Archived 18 July 2014 at the Wayback Machine	Sergio Llull (19)	Felipe Reyes (7)	Pablo Prigioni (6)	Caja Mágica; 6,139	21–6

April: 3–1 (home: 2–0; road: 1–1)

Game	Date	Team	Score	High points	High rebounds	High assists	Location Attendance	Record
28	3 April	@ CB Granada	W 73–65 Archived 5 March 2016 at the Wayback Machine	Pablo Prigioni (15)	Nikola Mirotić (7)	Pablo Prigioni (8)	Palacio de los Deportes de Granada; 7,095	22–6
29	9 April	Regal FC Barcelona	W 77–72 (OT) Archived 18 July 2014 at the Wayback Machine	Carlos Suárez (19)	Carlos Suárez (7)	Pablo Prigioni (6)	Caja Mágica; 10,788	23–6
30	16 April	@ CAI Zaragoza	L 84–86 Archived 6 March 2016 at the Wayback Machine	Felipe Reyes, Carlos Suárez (14)	Ante Tomić (7)	Sergio Rodríguez, Clay Tucker (6)	Pabellón Príncipe Felipe; 9,200	23–7
31	23 April	Caja Laboral	W 76–71 Archived 5 March 2016 at the Wayback Machine	D'or Fischer (19)	Felipe Reyes (8)	Carlos Suárez (5)	Caja Mágica; 6,253	24–7

May: 2–1 (home: 1–0; road: 1–1)

Game	Date	Team	Score	High points	High rebounds	High assists	Location Attendance	Record
32	1 May	@ Baloncesto Fuenlabrada	L 79–88 Archived 6 March 2016 at the Wayback Machine	Sergio Llull (17)	D'or Fischer (6)	Sergio Llull (5)	Pabellón Fernando Martín; 5,497	24–8
33	12 May	Cajasol	W 78–59 Archived 3 August 2014 at the Wayback Machine	Sergio Rodríguez (19)	Felipe Reyes (7)	Sergio Llull (7)	Caja Mágica; 4,784	25–8
34	15 May	@ ViveMenorca	W 91–76 Archived 4 March 2016 at the Wayback Machine	D'or Fischer (24)	D'or Fischer (8)	Clay Tucker (4)	Pabellón Menorca; 4,400	26–8

2010–11 season schedule

=== Euroleague ===
==== Regular season ====
18 October 2010
20:45 CET

Report

Olympiacos Piraeus (Greece)	82–66	(Spain) Real Madrid
Scoring by quarter: 17–17, 19–18, 26–21, 20–10
Pts: Bourousis, Spanoulis 16; Rebs: Bourousis, Nesterović 7 Asts: Spanoulis, Teodosić 7		Pts: Llull 18; Rebs: Tomić 6 Asts: Llull, Suárez 3

Peace and Friendship Stadium
Piraeus, Greece
Attendance: 9,200
Referees: Luigi Lamonica (ITA), Ilija Belosevic (SRB), Eddie Viator (FRA)

28 October 2010
20:45 CET

Report

Real Madrid (Spain)	68–56	(Spain) Unicaja
Scoring by quarter: 17–18, 17–14, 19–11, 15–13
Pts: Reyes 17; Rebs: Tomić 14; Asts: Llull 4		Pts: Rodríguez 16; Rebs: Printezis 4 Asts: Rodríguez 5

Caja Mágica
Madrid, Spain
Attendance: 5,742
Referees: Grzegorz Ziemblicki (POL), Recep Ankarali (TUR), David Chambon (FRA)

4 November 2010
21:00 CET

Report

Virtus Roma (Italy)	56–74	(Spain) Real Madrid
Scoring by quarter: 15–13, 6–26, 12–21, 23–14
Pts: Đedović 13; Rebs: Traore 8 Asts: Giachetti, Vitali 3		Pts: Tomić, Tucker 12; Rebs: Rodríguez, Tomić 7 Asts: Rodríguez 7

PalaLottomatica
Rome, Italy
Attendance: 4,273
Referees: Zoran Sutulovic (MNE), Spiros Gkontas (GRE), Robert Lottermoser (GER)

11 November 2010
20:45 CET

Report

Real Madrid (Spain)	83–81 (OT)	(Germany) Brose Baskets
Scoring by quarter: 14–20, 23–16, 18–18, 18–19, Overtime: 10–8
Pts: Reyes 18; Rebs: Suárez 9 Asts: Llull 6		Pts: Roberts 21; Rebs: Hines 7 Asts: Jacobsen 4

Caja Mágica
Madrid, Spain
Attendance: 4,632
Referees: Marek Cmikiewicz (POL), Anastasios Piloidis (GRE), Roberto Chiari (ITA)

17 November 2010
20:00 CET

Report

Spirou Basket (Belgium)	67–49	(Spain) Real Madrid
Scoring by quarter: 15–12, 18–13, 19–12, 15–12
Pts: Greene 14; Rebs: Riddick, Wright 8 Asts: Mallet 8		Pts: Reyes 12; Rebs: Reyes 8 Asts: Rodríguez 3

Spiroudome
Charleroi, Belgium
Attendance: 6,000
Referees: Fabio Facchini (ITA), Luis Lopes (POR), Marko Juras (SRB)

25 November 2010
20:45 CET

Report

Real Madrid (Spain)	82–68	(Greece) Olympiacos Piraeus
Scoring by quarter: 24–14, 18–20, 16–16, 24–18
Pts: Rodríguez 19; Rebs: Reyes, Tomić 8 Asts: Rodríguez 6		Pts: Teodosić 21; Rebs: Mavrokefalidis 7 Asts: Spanoulis 3

Caja Mágica
Madrid, Spain
Attendance: 7,487
Referees: Sasa Pukl (SLO), Matej Boltauzer (SLO), Olegs Latisevs (LAT)

2 December 2010
20:45 CET

Report

Unicaja (Spain)	75–71	(Spain) Real Madrid
Scoring by quarter: 16–20, 17–19, 14–16, 28–16
Pts: Blanco 17; Rebs: Freeland 10; Asts: Blakney, Rodríguez 4		Pts: Llull 16; Rebs: Reyes 7 Asts: Llull, Prigioni, Suárez 3

Jose Maria Martin Carpena Arena
Málaga, Spain
Attendance: 11,000
Referees: Carl Jungebrand (FIN), Fernando Rocha (POR), Sinisa Herceg (CRO)

9 December 2010
20:45 CET

Report

Real Madrid (Spain)	72–50	(Italy) Virtus Roma
Scoring by quarter: 14–11, 16–11, 24–17, 18–11
Pts: Llull 14; Rebs: Fischer 9 Asts: Rodríguez 6		Pts: Datome 12; Rebs: Crosariol, Datome, Iannilli, Traore, Washington 5 Asts: Washington 3

Caja Mágica
Madrid, Spain
Attendance: 4,154
Referees: Volodymr Drabikovsky (UKR), Radomir Vojinovic (MNE), Boris Shulga (UKR)

15 December 2010
20:30 CET

Report

Brose Baskets (Germany)	82–75	(Spain) Real Madrid
Scoring by quarter: 20–17, 17–14, 25–20, 20–24
Pts: Suput 21; Rebs: Goldsberry, Hines, Jacobsen 5 Asts: Goldsberry, Roberts 5		Pts: Llull 16; Rebs: Fischer 14; Asts: Llull 4

Jako Arena
Bamberg, Germany
Attendance: 6,800
Referees: Christos Christodoulou (GRE), Milivoje Jovcic (SRB), Tomas Jasevicius (LTH)

23 December 2010
20:45 CET

Report

Real Madrid (Spain)	94–45	(Belgium) Spirou Basket
Scoring by quarter: 29–16, 17–13, 22–12, 26–4
Pts: Mirotić 19; Rebs: Fischer 11; Asts: Rodríguez 5		Pts: Broyles 12; Rebs: Mallet, Riddick, Santiago 3 Asts: Hamilton 2

Caja Mágica
Madrid, Spain
Attendance: 4,037
Referees: Ilija Belosevic (SRB), Marcin Kowalski (POL), Joseph Bissang (FRA)

Source: Euroleague.net

==== Top 16 ====
19 January 2011
20:45 CET

Report

Real Madrid (Spain)	78–58	(Serbia) Partizan Belgrade
Scoring by quarter: 17–18, 26–9, 15–13, 20–18
Pts: Llull 21; Rebs: Veličković 12; Asts: Llull 4		Pts: Veselý 13; Rebs: Gist 9 Asts: Jerrells 4

Caja Mágica
Madrid, Spain
Attendance: 5,097
Referees: Volodymr Drabikovsky (UKR), Robert Lottermoser (GER), Elias Koromilas (GRE)

26 January 2011
20:45 CET

Report

Montepaschi Siena (Italy)	68–78	(Spain) Real Madrid
Scoring by quarter: 20–13, 20–15, 22–24, 6–26
Pts: Moss 16; Rebs: Lavrinovič, Stonerook 5 Asts: Kaukėnas 4		Pts: Mirotić 16; Rebs: Reyes 11; Asts: Prigioni 6

Palasport Mens Sana
Siena, Italy
Attendance: 4,991
Referees: Carl Jungebrand (FIN), Matej Boltauzer (SLO), Eddie Viator (FRA)

3 February 2011
20:45 CET

Report

Real Madrid (Spain)	89–86 (OT)	(Turkey) Efes Pilsen Istanbul
Scoring by quarter: 18–19, 22–27, 25–19, 14–14, Overtime: 10–7
Pts: Tucker 19; Rebs: Fischer 12; Asts: Rodríguez 7		Pts: Thornton 18; Rebs: Gönlüm 9 Asts: Tunçeri 5

Caja Mágica
Madrid, Spain
Attendance: 6,032
Referees: Sasa Pukl (SLO), Grzegorz Ziemblicki (POL), Milivoje Jovcic (SRB)

17 February 2011
19:30 CET

Report

Efes Pilsen Istanbul (Turkey)	60–77	(Spain) Real Madrid
Scoring by quarter: 12–13, 12–22, 13–21, 23–21
Pts: Tunçeri 14; Rebs: Roberts, Thornton 7 Asts: Murray, Roberts 2		Pts: Llull 17; Rebs: Fischer 7 Asts: Llull 5

Sinan Erdem Dome
Istanbul, Turkey
Attendance: 14,250
Referees: Zoran Sutulovic (MNE), Paolo Taurino (ITA), Sinisa Herceg (CRO)

24 February 2011
20:45 CET

Report

Partizan Belgrade (Serbia)	56–61	(Spain) Real Madrid
Scoring by quarter: 12–15, 6–18, 18–11, 20–17
Pts: Veselý 15; Rebs: Gist, Katić 8 Asts: Gist 2		Pts: Tomić 21; Rebs: Mirotić 9 Asts: Prigioni 6

Belgrade Arena
Belgrade, Serbia
Attendance: 16,525
Referees: Fabio Facchini (ITA), Recep Ankarali (TUR), Luis Lopes (POR)

3 March 2011
19:45 CET

Real Madrid (Spain)	77–95	(Italy) Montepaschi Siena
Scoring by quarter: 19–26, 13–29, 19–23, 26–17
Pts: Mirotić 13; Rebs: Reyes 6 Asts: Llull, Rodríguez 5		Pts: Hairston 17; Rebs: Raković 5 Asts: Zisis 4

Caja Mágica
Madrid, Spain
Attendance: 4,821
Referees: Volodymr Drabikovsky (UKR), Sradan Dozai (CRO), Matej Boltauzer (SLO)

Source: Euroleague.net

==== Quarterfinals ====
Game 1

22 March 2011
20:45 CEST

Report

Real Madrid (Spain)	71–65	(Spain) Power Electronics Valencia
Scoring by quarter: 20–18, 13–14, 19–21, 19–12
Pts: Tomić 14; Rebs: Reyes 9 Asts: Llull, Prigioni, Suárez 3		Pts: de Colo 15; Rebs: Javtokas 6 Asts: Cook 8

Caja Mágica, Madrid
Attendance: 8,345
Referees: Juan Carlos Arteaga (ESP), Juan Carlos Garcia Gonzalez (ESP), Sinisa Herceg (CRO)

Game 2

24 March 2011
20:45 CEST

Report

Real Madrid (Spain)	75–81	(Spain) Power Electronics Valencia
Scoring by quarter: 19–17, 19–18, 16–24, 21–22
Pts: Llull 18; Rebs: Mirotić 7 Asts: Prigioni 7		Pts: Cook 20; Rebs: Savanović 10; Asts: Cook 6

Caja Mágica, Madrid
Attendance: 10,112
Referees: Jose Martin (ESP), Christos Christodoulou (GRE), Milijove Jovcic (SRB)

Game 3

29 March 2011
20:45 CEST

Report

Power Electronics Valencia (Spain)	66–75	(Spain) Real Madrid
Scoring by quarter: 19–17, 15–14, 17–17, 15–27
Pts: Savanović 21; Rebs: Javtokas 8 Asts: Cook 8		Pts: Fischer 19; Rebs: Fischer 8 Asts: Llull 7

Pabellon Municipal Fuente San Luis, Valencia
Attendance: 9,000
Referees: Luigi Lamonica (ITA), Ilija Belosevic (SRB), Elias Koromilas (GRE)

Game 4

31 March 2011
20:45 CEST

Report

Power Electronics Valencia (Spain)	81–72	(Spain) Real Madrid
Scoring by quarter: 17–14, 23–24, 19–17, 22–17
Pts: Cook 16; Rebs: Javtokas 7 Asts: Cook 7		Pts: Tomić 20; Rebs: Veličković 5 Asts: Prigioni 6

Pabellon Municipal Fuente San Luis, Valencia
Attendance: 9,000
Referees: Juan Carlos Mitjana (ESP), Dani Hierrezuelo (ESP), Robert Lottermoser (GER)

Game 5

7 April 2011
20:45 CEST

Report

Real Madrid (Spain)	66–58	(Spain) Power Electronics Valencia
Scoring by quarter: 11–17, 29–25, 18–9, 8–7
Pts: Suárez, Tucker 12; Rebs: Reyes, Suárez 10; Asts: Prigioni 4		Pts: Savanović 19; Rebs: Savanović 6 Asts: Cook 3
Real Madrid wins series, 3–2

Caja Mágica, Madrid
Attendance: 12,093
Referees: Volodymr Drabikovsky (UKR), Sasa Pukl (SLO), Tolga Sahin (ITA)

Source: Euroleague.net

==== Final Four ====
===== Semifinals =====
6 May 2011
21:00

Maccabi Tel Aviv (Israel)	82–63	(Spain) Real Madrid
Scoring by quarter: 14–12, 18–17, 23–18, 27–16
Pts: Eidson 19; Rebs: Eidson 8 Asts: Pargo 7		Pts: Tomić 17; Rebs: Reyes 14; Asts: Prigioni, Suárez 3

Palau Sant Jordi, Barcelona
Attendance: 16,008
Referees: Luigi Lamonica (ITA), Christos Christodoulou (GRE), Zoran Sutulovic (MNE)

===== Third-place playoff =====
8 May 2011
13:30

Report

Montepaschi Siena (Italy)	80–62	(Spain) Real Madrid
Scoring by quarter: 19–11, 17–21, 21–13, 23–17
Pts: Lavrinovič 17; Rebs: Raković 11; Asts: Lavrinovič 4		Pts: Llull 23; Rebs: Tomić 7 Asts: Prigioni 5

Palau Sant Jordi, Barcelona
Attendance: 13,000
Referees: Christos Christodoulou (GRE), Matej Bolatauzer (SLO), Eddie Viator (FRA)

Source: Euroleague.net

=== Copa del Rey ===
==== Quarterfinals ====
10 February 2011
21:30 CET

Report

Real Madrid (Community of Madrid)	78–72	(Canary Islands) Gran Canaria 2014
Scoring by quarter: 14–21, 25–13, 17–17, 22–21
Pts: Rodríguez 17; Rebs: Suárez 7 Asts: Rodríguez, Suárez 3		Pts: Carroll 30; Rebs: Rey 9 Asts: Beirán, Carroll, Nelson 3

Palacio de Deportes,
Madrid
Attendance: 12,500
Referees: Francisco de la Maza, Miguel Angel Pérez Pérez, Carlos Peruga

==== Semifinals ====
12 February 2011
18:00 CET

Report

Power Electronics Valencia (Valencian Community)	66–76	(Community of Madrid) Real Madrid
Scoring by quarter: 14–11, 21–16, 13–19, 11–23
Pts: Martínez 19; Rebs: Claver 4 Asts: Cook, Martínez 2		Pts: Suárez 16; Rebs: Tucker 5 Asts: Rodríguez 5

Palacio de Deportes,
Madrid
Attendance: 13,045
Referees: José Antonio Martín Bertrán, José Ramón García Ortiz, Vicente Bultó

==== Final ====
13 February 2011
18:00 CET

Report

Real Madrid (Community of Madrid)	60–68	(Catalonia) Regal FC Barcelona
Scoring by quarter: 17–19, 13–11, 13–18, 17–20
Pts: Tomić 12; Rebs: Suárez 9 Asts: Suárez 3		Pts: Anderson 19; Rebs: N'Dong 8 Asts: Sada 6

Palacio de Deportes,
Madrid
Attendance: 13,045
Referees: José Antonio Martín Bertrán, Daniel Hierrezuelo, Juan Luis Redondo

Source: Copadelreyacb.com

=== Spanish Supercup ===
==== Semifinals ====
24 September 2010
21:30 CET

Recap

Regal FC Barcelona (Catalonia)	89–55	(Community of Madrid) Real Madrid
Scoring by quarter: 26–15, 19–14, 31–8, 13–18
Pts: Morris 16; Rebs: Rubio, Perović, Vázquez 6 Asts: Navarro 6		Pts: Tucker 15; Rebs: Reyes 5 Asts: Prigioni 3

Fernando Buesa Arena,
Vitoria-Gasteiz
Attendance: 9,500
Referees: Daniel Hierrezuelo, Antonio Conde, Carlos Peruga

=== Preseason and exhibitions ===
==== Villa de Mislata Trophy ====
4 September 2010
18:00 CET

Recap

Power Electronics Valencia (Valencian Community)	68–78	(Community of Madrid) Real Madrid
Scoring by half: 29–44, 39–34
Pts: Šundov 19		Pts: Mirotić 22

Pabellon Municipal Fuente San Luis,
Valencia

==== Community of Madrid tournament ====
27 September 2010
20:45 CET

Recap

Real Madrid (Community of Madrid)	85–81	(Community of Madrid) Baloncesto Fuenlabrada
Scoring by quarter: 20–13, 23–19, 24–23, 18–26
Pts: Reyes 19		Pts: Valters 23

Polideportivo Fernando Martin,
Madrid
Attendance: 2,000

30 September 2010
20:30 CET

Recap

Asefa Estudiantes (Community of Madrid)	79–84	(Community of Madrid) Real Madrid
Scoring by quarter: 23–23, 21–16, 13–23, 22–22
Pts: Gabriel 16; Rebs: Asselin 9 Asts: Gabriel 4		Pts: Suárez 21; Rebs: Fischer 8 Asts: Llull 4

Palacio de Deportes de la Comunidad de Madrid,
Madrid
Attendance: 13,000
Referees: E. Pérez Pizarro, Lluis Guirao, M.A. Pérez Niz

== See also ==
- 2010–11 ACB season
- 2010–11 Euroleague
- Supercopa de España de Baloncesto 2010
