= 2010–11 Euroleague Regular Season Group B =

Standings and Results for Group B of the Regular Season phase of the 2010–11 Euroleague basketball tournament.

== Standings ==
Key to colors
Top four places in each group advance to Top 16

	Team	Pld	W	L	PF	PA	Diff	Tie-break
1.	(Greece) Olympiacos	10	7	3	805	730	+75	
2.	(Spain) Real Madrid	10	6	4	734	662	+72	
3.	(Spain) Unicaja Málaga	10	5	5	749	759	−10	1–1 +15
4.	(Italy) Lottomatica Roma	10	5	5	733	770	−37	1–1 −15
5.	(Germany) Brose Bamberg	10	4	6	714	739	−25	
6.	(Belgium) Spirou Charleroi	10	3	7	691	766	−75	

== Fixtures and results ==
All times given below are in Central European Time.

=== Game 1 ===
18 October 2010
20:45

Report

Olympiacos (Greece)	82–66	(Spain) Real Madrid
Scoring by quarter: 17–17, 19–18, 26–21, 20–10
Pts: Spanoulis, Bourousis 16; Rebs: Nesterović, Bourousis 7 Asts: Spanoulis, Teodosić 7		Pts: Llull 18; Rebs: Tomić 6 Asts: Suárez, Llull 3

Peace and Friendship Stadium, Piraeus
Attendance: 9,200
Referees: Luigi Lamonica (ITA), Iljia Belosevic (SRB), Eddie Viator (FRA)

20 October 2010
21:00

Report

Lottomatica Roma (Italy)	83–65	(Germany) Brose
Scoring by quarter: 20–16, 19–20, 24–10, 20–19
Pts: Charles Smith 16; Rebs: Dašić 7 Asts: Washington 5		Pts: Hines 20; Rebs: Terry, Hines 7 Asts: Roberts 3

PalaLottomatica, Rome
Attendance: 3,356
Referees: Juan Gonazlez (ESP), Nicola Maestre (FRA), Damir Javor (SLO)

21 October 2010
20:45

Report

Unicaja Málaga (Spain)	84–73	(Belgium) Spirou Charleroi
Scoring by quarter: 16–24, 26–20, 15–12, 27–17
Pts: Rubio 22; Rebs: Freeland 8 Asts: McIntyre 5		Pts: Greene 20; Rebs: Wright 10; Asts: Gomis, Mallet 3

Jose Maria Martin Carpena Arena, Málaga
Attendance: 8,350
Referees: Christos Christodoulou (GRE), Matej Boltauzer (SLO), Joseph Bissang (FRA)

=== Game 2 ===
27 October 2010
20:00

Report

Brose (Germany)	73–61	(Greece) Olympiacos
Scoring by quarter: 16–16, 18–12, 16–19, 23–14
Pts: Roberts 23; Rebs: Jacobsen, Terry 6 Asts: Goldsberry 4		Pts: Papaloukas 13; Rebs: Nesterović 9 Asts: Spanoulis, Teodosić 3

Jako Arena, Bamberg
Attendance: 6,800
Referees: Fabio Facchini (ITA), Vicente Bulto (ESP), Radomir Vojinovic (MNE)

27 October 2010
21:00

Report

Spirou Charleroi (Belgium)	55–64	(Italy) Lottomatica Roma
Scoring by quarter: 21–14, 10–16, 12–16, 12–18
Pts: Mallet 14; Rebs: Greene 8 Asts: Mallet 4		Pts: Washington 20; Rebs: Crosariol 8 Asts: Vitali 3

Spiroudome, Charleroi
Attendance: 5,000
Referees: Dani Hierrezulo (ESP), Sasa Maricic (SRB), Petri Mantyla (FIN)

28 October 2010
20:45

Report

Real Madrid (Spain)	68–56	(Spain) Unicaja Málaga
Scoring by quarter: 17–18, 17–14, 19–11, 15–13
Pts: Reyes 17; Rebs: Tomić 14; Asts: Llull 4		Pts: Rodríguez 16; Rebs: Printezis 4 Asts: Rodríguez 5

Caja Mágica, Madrid
Attendance: 5,742
Referees: Grzegorz Ziemblicki (POL), Recep Ankarali (TUR), David Chambon (FRA)

=== Game 3 ===
3 November 2010
19:00

Report

Olympiacos (Greece)	93–66	(Spain) Unicaja Málaga
Scoring by quarter: 27–11, 20–14, 21–20, 25–21
Pts: Bourousis, Papanikolaou 17; Rebs: Bourousis 7 Asts: Teodosić 9		Pts: Freeland, McIntyre 14; Rebs: Freeland 9 Asts: McIntyre 4

Peace and Friendship Stadium, Piraeus
Attendance: 5,500
Referees: Carl Jungebrand (FIN), Tolga Sahin (TUR), Damir Javor (SLO)

3 November 2010
20:30

Report

Brose (Germany)	79–69	(Belgium) Spirou Charleroi
Scoring by quarter: 13–18, 25–20, 20–20, 21–11
Pts: Hines 16; Rebs: Jacobsen 8 Asts: Jacobsen, Gavel 4		Pts: Riddick 13; Rebs: Hill, Gomis 6 Asts: Wright 4

Jako Arena, Bamberg
Attendance: 6,800
Referees: Dubravko Muhvic (CRO), Sergey Mikhaylov (RUS), Jurgis Laurinavicius (LTU)

4 November 2010
21:00

Report

Lottomatica Roma (Italy)	56–74	(Spain) Real Madrid
Scoring by quarter: 15–13, 6–26, 12–21, 23–14
Pts: Đedović 13; Rebs: Traore 8 Asts: Giachetti, Vitali 3		Pts: Tomić, Tucker 12; Rebs: Tomić, Rodríguez 7 Asts: Rodríguez 7

PalaLottomatica, Rome
Attendance: 4,273
Referees: Zoran Sutulovic (MNE), Spiros Gkontas (GRE), Robert Lottermoser (GER)

=== Game 4 ===
10 November 2010
21:00

Report

Olympiacos (Greece)	86–78	(Belgium) Spirou Charleroi
Scoring by quarter: 23–16, 19–17, 22–17, 22–28
Pts: Nesterović 18; Rebs: Bourousis 8 Asts: Spanoulis 8		Pts: Hill 14; Rebs: Greene 5 Asts: Greene, Gomis 3

Peace and Friendship Stadium, Piraeus
Attendance: 4,800
Referees: Juan Carlos Artega [ESP], Gianpaolo Cicoria [ITA], Enrico Sabetta [ITA]

10 November 2010
20:30

Report

Unicaja Málaga (Spain)	104–83	(Italy) Lottomatica Roma
Scoring by quarter: 17–16, 26–9, 27–28, 34–30
Pts: Rodríguez 24; Rebs: Freeland, Archibald 7 Asts: Rodríguez 10		Pts: Giachetti 20; Rebs: Crosariol 8 Asts: Crosariol 2

Jose Maria Martin Carpena Arena, Málaga
Attendance: 8,900
Referees: Sreten Radovic [CRO], Jakub Zamojski [POL], Olegs Latisevs [LAT]

11 November 2010
20:45

Report

Real Madrid (Spain)	83–81 (OT)	(Germany) Brose
Scoring by quarter: 14–20, 23–16, 18–18, 18–19, Overtime: 10–8
Pts: Reyes 18; Rebs: Suárez 9 Asts: Llull 6		Pts: Roberts 21; Rebs: Hines 7 Asts: Jacobsen 4

Caja Mágica, Madrid
Attendance: 4,632
Referees: Marek Cmikiewicz (POL), Anastasios Piloidis (GRE), Roberto Chiari (ITA)

=== Game 5 ===
17 November 2010
20:30

Report

Spirou Charleroi (Belgium)	67–49	(Spain) Real Madrid
Scoring by quarter: 15–12, 18–13, 19–12, 15–12
Pts: Greene 14; Rebs: Riddick, Wright 8 Asts: Mallet 8		Pts: Reyes 12; Rebs: Reyes 8 Asts: Rodríguez 3

Spiroudome, Charleroi
Attendance: 6,000
Referees: Fabio Facchini (ITA), Luis Lopes (POR), Marko Juras (SRB)

17 November 2010
21:00

Report

Lottomatica Roma (Italy)	71–86	(Greece) Olympiacos
Scoring by quarter: 18–24, 22–29, 15–15, 16–18
Pts: Crosariol 17; Rebs: Traore 7 Asts: Giachetti, Smit 3		Pts: Bourousis 16; Rebs: Bourousis 10; Asts: Teodosić 7

PalaLottomatica, Rome
Attendance: 3,840
Referees: Juan Carlos Mitjana (ESP), Sradan Dozai (CRO), Milija Vojinovic (SRB)

18 November 2010
20:30

Report

Brose (Germany)	65–69	(Spain) Unicaja Málaga
Scoring by quarter: 20–18, 17–15, 14–10, 14–26
Pts: Roberts 13; Rebs: Pleiß 10; Asts: Goldsberry, Roberts 3		Pts: Freeland 19; Rebs: Lima 8 Asts: Rodríguez 4

Jako Arena, Bamberg
Attendance: 6,800
Referees: Zoran Sutulovic (MNE), Spiros Gkontas (GRE), Nicola Maestre (FRA)

=== Game 6 ===
25 November 2010
20:15

Report

Brose (Germany)	67–68	(Italy) Lottomatica Roma
Scoring by quarter: 9–19, 21–12, 21–22, 16–15
Pts: Jacobsen 15; Rebs: Pleiß 12; Asts: Goldsberry 4		Pts: Washington 17; Rebs: Dašić 7 Asts: Vitali 3

Jako Arena, Bamberg
Attendance: 6,800
Referees: José Martín (ESP), Sergiy Chebyshev (UKR), Zdravko Rutesic (MNE)

25 November 2010
20:30

Report

Spirou Charleroi (Belgium)	79–74	(Spain) Unicaja Málaga
Scoring by quarter: 19–16, 22–19, 15–22, 23–17
Pts: Mallet 21; Rebs: Santiago 8 Asts: Wright, Greene 4		Pts: Freeland 14; Rebs: Freeland 7 Asts: Blakney 6

Spiroudome, Charleroi
Attendance: 3,000
Referees: Grzegorz Ziemblicki (POL), Murat Birick (TUR), Paolo Taurino (ITA)

25 November 2010
20:45

Report

Real Madrid (Spain)	82–68	(Greece) Olympiacos
Scoring by quarter: 24–14, 18–20, 16–16, 24–18
Pts: Rodríguez 19; Rebs: Tomić, Reyes 8 Asts: Rodríguez 6		Pts: Teodosić 21; Rebs: Mavrokefalidis 7 Asts: Spanoulis 3

Caja Mágica, Madrid
Attendance: 7,487
Referees: Sasa Pukl (SLO), Matej Boltuarez (SLO), Olegs Latisevs (LAT)

=== Game 7 ===
2 December 2010
20:45

Report

Olympiacos (Greece)	86–69	(Germany) Brose
Scoring by quarter: 18–18, 30–16, 18–17, 20–18
Pts: Spanoulis, Mavrokefalidis 16; Rebs: Bourousis 12; Asts: Teodosić 5		Pts: Pleiß 16; Rebs: Hines 10; Asts: Goldsberry 5

Peace and Friendship Stadium, Piraeus
Attendance: 4,500
Referees: Guerrino Cerebuch (ITA), Sergiy Zashchuck (UKR), Sasa Maricic (SRB)

2 December 2010
20:45

Report

Unicaja Málaga (Spain)	75–71	(Spain) Real Madrid
Scoring by quarter: 16–20, 17–19, 14–16, 28–16
Pts: Blanco 17; Rebs: Freeland 10; Asts: Rodríguez, Blakney 4		Pts: Llull 16; Rebs: Reyes 7 Asts: Three players 3

Jose Maria Martin Carpena Arena, Málaga
Attendance: 11,000
Referees: Carl Jungebrand (FIN), Fernando Rocha (POR), Sinisa Herceg (CRO)

2 December 2010
21:00

Report

Lottomatica Roma (Italy)	95–83	(Belgium) Spirou Charleroi
Scoring by quarter: 22–24, 19–21, 25–21, 29–17
Pts: Washington 27; Rebs: Three players 5 Asts: Đedović 4		Pts: Gomis 19; Rebs: Riddick 7 Asts: Gomis, Mallet 4

PalaLottomatica, Rome
Attendance: 3,231
Referees: Sasa Pukl (SLO), Juan Carlos Garcia Gonzalez (ESP), Sradan Dozai (CRO)

=== Game 8 ===
8 December 2010
20:30

Report

Spirou Charleroi (Belgium)	75–61	(Germany) Brose
Scoring by quarter: 16–20, 19–19, 19–10, 21–12
Pts: Mallet 26; Rebs: Wright 11; Asts: Mallet 4		Pts: Pleiß 13; Rebs: Pleiß 9 Asts: Šuput, Jacobsen 4

Spiroudome, Charleroi
Attendance: 3,800
Referees: Juan Carlos Arteaga (ESP), Milija Vojinovic (SRB), Haris Bijedic (BIH)

9 December 2010
20:45

Report

Unicaja Málaga (Spain)	76–74	(Greece) Olympiacos
Scoring by quarter: 17–17, 25–20, 20–13, 14–24
Pts: Blanco 21; Rebs: Freeland 7 Asts: Blakney 6		Pts: Teodosić 20; Rebs: Bourousis 8 Asts: Spanoulis 5

Jose Maria Martin Carpena Arena, Málaga
Attendance: 9,250
Referees: Ilija Belosevic [SRB], Carmelo Paternico [ITA], Luis Lopes [POR]

9 December 2010
20:45

Report

Real Madrid (Spain)	72–50	(Italy) Lottomatica Roma
Scoring by quarter: 14–11, 16–11, 24–17, 18–11
Pts: Llull 14; Rebs: Fischer 9 Asts: Rodríguez 6		Pts: Datome 12; Rebs: Five players 5 Asts: Washington 3

Caja Mágica, Madrid
Attendance: 4,154
Referees: Volodymr Drabikovsky [UKR], Radomir Vojinovic [MNE], Boris Shulga [UKR]

=== Game 9 ===
13 December 2010
20:30

Report

Spirou Charleroi (Belgium)	67–80	(Greece) Olympiacos
Scoring by quarter: 14–25, 20–17, 16–19, 17–19
Pts: Mallet 16; Rebs: Three players 5 Asts: Broyles 4		Pts: Bourousis 19; Rebs: Nesterović 11; Asts: Spanoulis 6

Spiroudome, Charleroi
Attendance: 6,000
Referees: Luigi Lamonica (ITA), Dani Hierrezuelo (ESP), Sinisa Herceg (CRO)

15 December 2010
20:45

Report

Lottomatica Roma (Italy)	81–75	(Spain) Unicaja Málaga
Scoring by quarter: 20–15, 22–25, 20–20, 19–15
Pts: Đedović 23; Rebs: Traore 10; Asts: Đedović 6		Pts: Archibald 18; Rebs: Archibald 9 Asts: Tripković 5

PalaLottomatica, Rome
Attendance: 3,251
Referees: Dubravko Muhvic [CRO], Eddie Viator [FRA], Damir Javor [SLO]

15 December 2010
21:00

Report

Brose (Germany)	82–75	(Spain) Real Madrid
Scoring by quarter: 20–17, 17–14, 25–20, 20–24
Pts: Suput 21; Rebs: Three players 5 Asts: Goldsberry, Roberts 5		Pts: Llull 16; Rebs: Fischer 14; Asts: Llull 4

Jako Arena, Bamberg
Attendance: 6,800
Referees: Christos Christodoulou [GRE], Milivoje Jovcic [SRB], Tomas Jasevicius [LTU]

=== Game 10 ===
23 December 2010
20:45

Report

Unicaja Málaga (Spain)	70–72	(Germany) Brose
Scoring by quarter: 26–16, 14–16, 13–11, 17–29
Pts: Archibald 15; Rebs: Archibald 6 Asts: Rodríguez 5		Pts: Gavel 13; Rebs: Pleiß, Hines 4 Asts: Lynch 7

Jose Maria Martin Carpena Arena, Málaga
Attendance: 5,800
Referees: Sasa Pukl (SLO), Renaud Geller (BEL), Petar Obradovic (BIH)

23 December 2010
20:45

Report

Real Madrid (Spain)	94–45	(Belgium) Spirou Charleroi
Scoring by quarter: 29–16, 17–13, 22–12, 26–4
Pts: Mirotić 19; Rebs: Fischer 11; Asts: Rodríguez 5		Pts: Broyles 12; Rebs: three players 3 Asts: Hamilton 2

Caja Mágica, Madrid
Attendance: 4,037
Referees: Ilija Belosevic (SRB), Marcin Kowalski (POL), Joseph Bissang (FRA)

23 December 2010
20:45

Report

Olympiacos (Greece)	89–82	(Italy) Lottomatica Roma
Scoring by quarter: 22–22, 23–17, 19–14, 25–29
Pts: Spanoulis 18; Rebs: three players 6 Asts: three players 4		Pts: Traore 22; Rebs: Traore 6 Asts: Washington, Dašić 3

Peace and Friendship Stadium, Piraeus
Attendance: 6,000
Referees: Juan Carlos Arteaga (ESP), Murat Biricik (TUR), Aleksandar Milojevik (MKD)
