= 2006–07 KK Partizan season =

Partizan Belgrade
2006–07 season
- President: Predrag Danilović
- Head coach: Duško Vujošević
- Basketball League of Serbia: Champion
- Radivoj Korać Cup: Runners-up
- Adriatic League: Champion
- Euroleague: TOP 16

In the 2006–07 season, Partizan Belgrade competed in the Basketball League of Serbia, Radivoj Korać Cup, Adriatic League and Euroleague.

== Adriatic League ==
=== Standings ===
	Team	Pld	W	L	PF	PA	Diff	Pts
1.	FMP Železnik	26	21	5	2256	2099	+157	47
2.	Cibona	26	20	6	2222	2045	+177	46
3.	Partizan Belgrade	26	20	6	2187	1939	+248	46
4.	Hemofarm	26	18	8	2132	1968	+164	44

=== Regular season ===
30 September 2006 1	Partizan Belgrade (Serbia)	80–49	(Serbia) Hemofarm	Belgrade
	Scoring by quarter: 18–6, 23–16, 17–17, 22–10
	Pts: Perović 17	Report	Pts: Vukosavljević 13	Arena: Pionir Hall

3 October 2006 2	Cibona (Croatia)	82–64	(Serbia) Partizan Belgrade	Zagreb
	Scoring by quarter: 27–17, 21–14, 19–18, 15–15
	Pts: Kus, Warren 14	Report	Pts: Perović 15	Arena: Dražen Petrović Basketball Hall

7 October 2006 3	Partizan Belgrade (Serbia)	84–70	(Slovenia) Olimpija	Belgrade
16:30	Scoring by quarter: 25–12, 21–24, 23–17, 15–17
	Pts: Tripković, Drobnjak 19	Report	Pts: Rannikko 15	Arena: Hala Pionir; Attendance: 1723

9 October 2006 4	Partizan Belgrade (Serbia)	81–67	(Slovenia) Helios	Belgrade
17:00	Scoring by quarter: 22–20, 22–16, 23–10, 14–21
	Pts: Tripković 21; Rebs: Perović 10; Asts: Kecman 3	Report	Pts: Janža 14; Rebs: Dončić 8	Arena: Hala Pionir; Attendance: 1012

== Kup Radivoja Koraća ==
Quarterfinals

8 February 2007	Partizan Belgrade	108–75	Radnički 034 Group	Kragujevac
18:00	Scoring by quarter: 30–21, 25–20, 26–16, 27–18
	Pts: Peković 15	Report	Pts: Glišović 20	Arena: Jezero Hall; Attendance: 4,000; Referees: Jovčić, Juras, Obrknežević

Semifinals

10 February 2007	Partizan Belgrade	94–89(OT)	Hemofarm	Kragujevac
20:30	Scoring by quarter: 18–18, 18–14, 20–19, 20–25, Overtime: 18–13
	Pts: Perović 17	Report	Pts: Nešović 22	Arena: Jezero Hall; Attendance: 4,000; Referees: Belošević, Nešković, Mrdak

Final

11 February 2007	Partizan Belgrade	61–79	FMP	Kragujevac
19:00	Scoring by quarter: 16–13, 15–15, 17–13, 12–32
	Pts: Tripković 12	Report	Pts: Rašić, Erceg 15	Arena: Jezero Hall; Attendance: 4,000

== Euroleague ==
=== Regular season ===
==== Group B ====
	Team	Pld	W	L	PF	PA	Diff
1.	(Greece) Panathinaikos	14	11	3	1128	1036	92
2.	(Israel) Maccabi Tel Aviv	14	8	6	1230	1177	53
3.	(Spain) DKV Joventut	14	7	7	1112	1049	63
4.	(Spain) Unicaja	14	7	7	1001	1085	-84
5.	(Italy) Lottomatica Roma	14	6	8	1027	1044	-17
6.	(Serbia) Partizan Belgrade	14	6	8	1100	1093	7
7.	(Croatia) Cibona	14	6	8	1113	1141	-28
8.	(Slovenia) Union Olimpija	14	5	9	1038	1124	-86

Win Loss

25 October 2006	Lottomatica Roma (Italy)	65–60	(Serbia) Partizan Belgrade	Rome
	Scoring by quarter: 14–12, 18–16, 19–18, 14–14
	Pts: Bodiroga 14; Rebs: Garri, Mavrokefalidis, Bodiroga 6 Asts: Giachetti 3	Report	Pts: Drobnjak 17; Rebs: Perović 12; Asts: Cummings 4	Arena: PalaLottomatica; Attendance: 0 Referees: ZAVLANOS, NIKOLAOS; BACHAR, SHMUEL; PEREZ, EMILIO

2 November 2006	Partizan Belgrade (Serbia)	103–91	(Israel) Maccabi Tel Aviv	Belgrade
	Scoring by quarter: 21–19, 28–23, 34–25, 20–24
	Pts: Drobnjak 23; Rebs: Bogdanović, Perović 6 Asts: Cummings 5	Report	Pts: Jasaitis 27; Rebs: Vujčić 6 Asts: four players 2	Arena: Pionir Hall; Attendance: 6,727; Referees: FACCHINI, FABIO; CHRISTODOULOU, CHRISTOS; VIATOR, EDDIE

8 November 2006	DKV Joventut (Spain)	82–51	(Serbia) Partizan Belgrade	Badalona
	Scoring by quarter: 23–12, 14–13, 22–17, 23–9
	Pts: Bartoň 18; Rebs: Gaines 9 Asts: Bennett 6	Report	Pts: Drobnjak 14; Rebs: Perović 9 Asts: Tepić 3	Arena: Palau Municipal d'Esports de Badalona; Attendance: 4,085; Referees: LAMONICA, LUIGI; MASTRAFTSIS, CHRISTOS; LOPES, LUIS

15 November 2006	Partizan Belgrade (Serbia)	101–92(OT)	(Croatia) Cibona	Belgrade
	Scoring by quarter: 15–17, 24–22, 20–16, 16–20, Overtime: 8–8, 18–8
	Pts: Perović 23; Rebs: Drobnjak, Perović 9 Asts: Cummings 7	Report	Pts: Kus, Wright 17; Rebs: Wright 10; Asts: Kus, Vrbanc 2	Arena: Pionir Hall; Attendance: 6,873; Referees: PITSILKAS, NIKOLAOS; DRABIKOVSKY, VOLODYMR; PATERNICO, CARMELO

22 November 2006	Union Olimpija (Slovenia)	70–71	(Serbia) Partizan Belgrade	Ljubljana
	Scoring by quarter: 17–15, 15–16, 21–13, 17–27
	Pts: Rannikko 26; Rebs: Milič 8 Asts: Rannikko 3	Report	Pts: Cummings 18; Rebs: Drobnjak 10	Arena: Tivoli Hall; Attendance: 4,400; Referees: KOUKOULEKIDIS, STELIOS; TOLA, LUCIANO; BITTON, MOSHE

29 November 2006	Partizan Belgrade (Serbia)	65–73	(Greece) Panathinaikos	Belgrade
	Scoring by quarter: 16–19, 18–11, 15–21, 16–22
	Pts: Drobnjak 17; Rebs: Drobnjak 7 Asts: Cummings 4	Report	Pts: Batiste 15; Rebs: Batiste 11; Asts: Diamantidis 3	Arena: Pionir Hall; Attendance: 7,023; Referees: BACHAR, SHMUEL; TAURINO, PAOLO; HIERREZUELO, DANIEL

6 December 2006	Unicaja (Spain)	66–58	(Serbia) Partizan Belgrade	Málaga
	Scoring by quarter: 22–16, 17–13, 20–22, 7–7
	Pts: Rodríguez 15; Rebs: Rodríguez 6 Asts: Rodríguez 4	Report	Pts: Cummings 16; Rebs: Perović 10; Asts: four players 4	Arena: Palacio de Deportes José María Martín Carpena; Attendance: 9,100; Referees: BRAZAUSKAS, ROMUALDAS; MOUZAKIS, COSTAS; BOLTAUZER, MATEJ

14 December 2006	Partizan Belgrade (Serbia)	73–63	(Italy) Lottomatica Roma	Belgrade
	Scoring by quarter: 17–10, 14–20, 20–13, 22–20
	Pts: Drobnjak 15; Rebs: Cummings, Kecman 5 Asts: Cummings 8	Report	Pts: Mavrokefalidis 16; Rebs: Garri, Bodiroga 5 Asts: Chatman 3	Arena: Pionir Hall; Attendance: 6,743; Referees: ARTEAGA, JUAN CARLOS; MASTRAFTSIS, CHRISTOS; LEFWERTH, OSCAR

21 December 2006	Maccabi Tel Aviv (Israel)	85–83	(Serbia) Partizan Belgrade	Tel Aviv
	Scoring by quarter: 10–22, 24–19, 26–12, 25–30
	Pts: Sharp 22; Rebs: Vujčić 12; Asts: Vujčić 4	Report	Pts: Drobnjak 23; Rebs: Drobnjak 16; Asts: Cummings 4	Attendance: 10,500; Referees: MITJANA, JUAN CARLOS; CEREBUCH, GUERRINO; PILOIDIS, ANASTASIOS

3 January 2007	Partizan Belgrade (Serbia)	74–83	(Spain) DKV Joventut	Belgrade
	Scoring by quarter: 22–21, '19–13, 14–17, 19–32
	Pts: Cummings 21; Rebs: Peković, Drobnjak 5 Asts: Cummings 4	Report	Pts: Fernández 26; Rebs: Gaines, Archibald 4 Asts: Bennett 3	Arena: Pionir Hall; Attendance: 6,785; Referees: SUDEK, PETR; SAHIN, TOLGA; MIKHAYLOV, SERGEY

11 January 2007	Cibona (Croatia)	89–72	(Serbia) Partizan Belgrade	Zagreb
	Scoring by quarter: 18–16, 23–26, 24–20, 24–10
	Pts: Wright 16; Rebs: Warren 8 Asts: Kus 4	Report	Pts: Drobnjak 20; Rebs: Perović 6 Asts: Drobnjak, Kecman 3	Arena: Dražen Petrović Basketball Hall; Attendance: 6,000; Referees: SUDEK, PETR; BACHAR, SHMUEL; VIATOR, EDDIE

17 January 2007	Partizan Belgrade (Serbia)	106–60	(Slovenia) Union Olimpija	Belgrade
	Scoring by quarter: 26–16, '32–12, 19–17, 29–15
	Pts: Perović 20; Rebs: Drobnjak 8 Asts: Tepić 5	Report	Pts: Markoishvili 19; Rebs: Markoishvili, Kuzminskas 4 Asts: Markoishvili, Arslan 4	Arena: Pionir Hall; Attendance: 6,897; Referees: GARCIA, JOSE RAMON; PILOIDIS, ANASTASIOS; CONDE, ANTONIO

24 January 2007	Panathinaikos (Greece)	80–94	(Serbia) Partizan Belgrade	Athens
	Scoring by quarter: 19–22, 15–24, 29–23, 17–24
	Pts: Delk 23; Rebs: Tsartsaris 7 Asts: Diamantidis 4	Report	Pts: Perović 20; Rebs: Drobnjak 9 Asts: Cummings 3	Arena: Olympic Indoor Hall; Attendance: 8,000; Referees: ARTEAGA, JUAN CARLOS; SHULGA, BORIS; PATERNICO, CARMELO

1 February 2007	Partizan Belgrade (Serbia)	90–94(OT)	(Spain) Unicaja	Belgrade
	Scoring by quarter: 12–22, '24–19, 12–16, 35–26, Overtime: 7–11
	Pts: Drobnjak 23; Rebs: Drobnjak 8 Asts: Cummings 4	Report	Pts: Sánchez 20; Rebs: Santiago 6 Asts: Rodríguez 7	Arena: Pionir Hall; Attendance: 8,123; Referees: KOUKOULEKIDIS, STELIOS; BITTON, MOSHE; CHRISTODOULOU, CHRISTOS
