= Sergio Scariolo =

Italian basketball coach (born 1961)

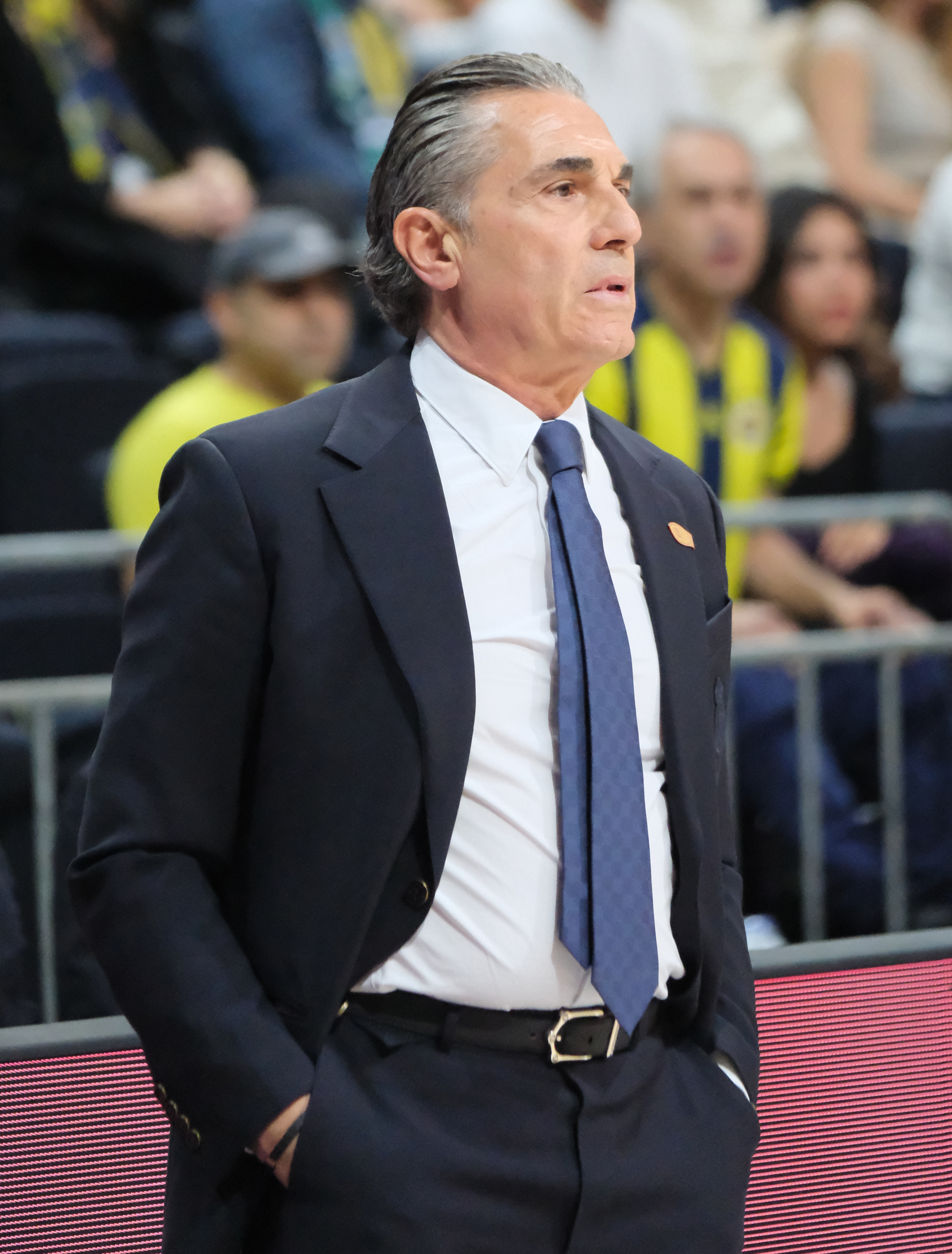
- Sergio Scariolo in 2026

Personal information
- Born: 1 April 1961 (age 65) Brescia, Italy

Career information
- Position: Head coach
- Coaching career: 1989–present

Career history

Coaching
- 1989–1991: Scavolini Pesaro
- 1991–1993: Aurora Desio
- 1993–1997: Fortitudo Bologna
- 1997–1999: Saski Baskonia
- 1999–2002: Real Madrid
- 2003–2008: Unicaja Málaga
- 2008–2010: Khimki Moscow
- 2009–2012: Spain
- 2011–2013: Olimpia Milano
- 2013–2014: Saski Baskonia
- 2015–2025: Spain
- 2018–2021: Toronto Raptors (assistant)
- 2021–2023: Virtus Bologna
- 2025–2026: Real Madrid

Career highlights
- As head coach: EuroCup champion (2022); Italian League champion (1990); 2× Spanish League champion (2000, 2006); 2× Spanish Cup winner (1999, 2005); Russian Cup winner (2008); 2x Italian Supercup winner (2021, 2022); 3× Andalusia Cup winner (2003, 2007, 2008); Italian Coach of the Year (1994); AEEB Spanish Coach of the Year (2000); As assistant coach: NBA champion (2019); Italian League champion (1988)
Medals
Representing Spain
Men's basketball
Summer Olympics
| Silver medal – second place | 2012 London |
| Bronze medal – third place | 2016 Rio |
World Cup
| Gold medal – first place | 2019 China |
EuroBasket
| Gold medal – first place | 2009 Poland |
| Gold medal – first place | 2011 Lithuania |
| Gold medal – first place | 2015 France–Croatia–Germany–Latvia |
| Bronze medal – third place | 2017 Finland–Israel–Romania–Turkey |
| Gold medal – first place | 2022 Czech Republic–Georgia–Italy–Germany |

Sergio Scariolo (born 1 April 1961) is an Italian professional basketball coach who last worked as the head coach of Real Madrid of the Liga ACB and the EuroLeague. During his club coaching career, Scariolo has won a EuroCup title, three national league championships, and an NBA championship as an assistant coach. Moreover, having won four EuroBasket championships and a World Cup at the head of Spain, Scariolo is one of the most successful coaches in the history of international competitions, and according to many players, journalists and commentators, he is regarded as the greatest national team coach of all time.

== Coaching career ==
=== Early years ===
Sergio Scariolo started his coaching career in the early 1980s, as the assistant coach of Basket Brescia, the team of his hometown, and Scavolini Pesaro. In 1985, he became the coach of Italy's military national team, with whom he won the world championship. As assistant coach of Valerio Bianchini in Pesaro, Scariolo won its first Italian Serie A championship in 1988.

=== First successes in Italy (1989–1997) ===
In 1989, Bianchini became the new coach of Virtus Roma and Scariolo was hired as new head coach of Pesaro. In the 1989–90 season, Scariolo's Scavolini was able of winning another Italian league title, defeating Pallacanestro Varese 3–1 in the national finals. Aged 29, Scariolo became the youngest coach ever to win the trophy. In the same season, the team also reached the FIBA Korać Cup Final, which lost against Joventut Badalona. In 1990–91 season, the club arrived 7th in the regular season and was ousted in the national quarterfinals by Phonola Caserta. However, Pesaro succeeded in reaching the European Champions Cup Final Four, but it was defeated 93–84 in the semi-finals by KK Split, which then won the trophy.

In the following year, he unexpectedly moved to Aurora Desio, of the Italian 2nd Division. After two seasons in which he failed to reach the promotion, he left the club. In 1993, Scariolo was hired by Fortitudo Bologna, a team which was becoming more and more ambitious under the new ownership of the entrepreneur Giorgio Seragnoli. In 1994, he was awarded as Coach of the Year of the Italian Serie A. In 1994–95 season, Fortitudo arrived second in the regular season but it was defeated in the national semi-finals by Benetton Treviso, while in 1995–96, Scariolo's team succeeded in reaching the national finals, the first ones in the history of the club, but Fortitudo was defeated 3–1 by Olimpia Milano.

=== Triumphs in Spain (1997–2008) ===
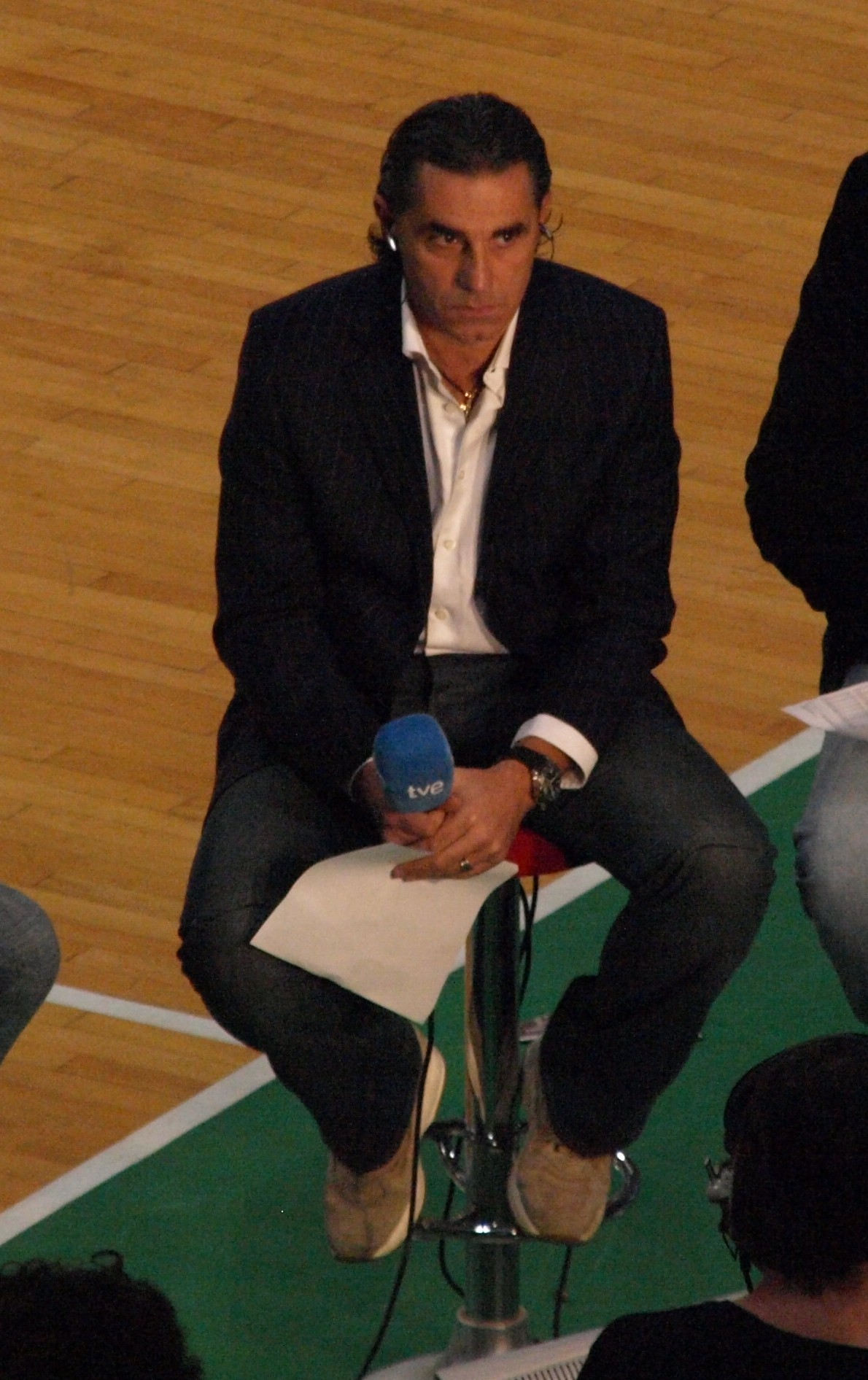
Scariolo in 2008

In 1997, he moved to Spain, a nation which deeply marked his entire career. With Scariolo as head coach, TAU Vitoria reached its first Spanish Championship final in 1998 and won a Spanish King's Cup title in 1999.

In 1999, Scariolo was hired by Real Madrid, one of the most important clubs of the Liga ACB. Initially Saski Baskonia demanded compensation of 50 million pesetas (300,000 euros), whereas Real Madrid paid half of the amount for his buyout. In the first season, he immediately led Real to win the Spanish national league title, defeating 3–2, Real's historic rival FC Barcelona; the team also reached the EuroLeague's quarterfinals, which lost against Fortitudo Bologna. However, in the following season, Real was defeated 3–0 by Barcelona in the national finals, while in 2001–02, it was ousted in the quarterfinals by CB Estudiantes and Scariolo was sacked.

From 2003 to 2008, Sergio Scariolo was the head coach of the Spanish club Unicaja Málaga, which, under his tenure and thanks to the leadership of Jorge Garbajosa, lived its so-called "golden age". In 2005, Málaga won the Spanish King's Cup title against Real Madrid and in the next year, during the 2005–06 season, it won its first-ever Spanish League championship, defeating TAU Vitoria 3–0 in the national finals. The club finished its best years to date, by qualifying for the 2007 Euroleague Final Four, where it was defeated in the semi-finals by CSKA Moscow, and thus finished in third place in the EuroLeague. In October 2007, Unicaja faced the NBA's Memphis Grizzlies in a friendly match, and they defeated the Grizzlies, by a score of 102–99. That was one of the few times that an NBA team has lost to a foreign club.

=== Difficult years in Moscow, Milan and Vitoria (2008–2014) ===
From 2008 to 2010, Scariolo served as the head coach of the Russian club BC Khimki Moscow. In both seasons he arrived second, losing the national finals against CSKA Moscow. In 2009, Scariolo's Khimki was also defeated 80–74 in the EuroCup Final against Lietuvos Rytas. On 20 December 2010, Scariolo and the club mutually agreed to rescind the contract.

In 2011, Scariolo returned to Italy, becoming the new head coach of Olimpia Milano. In 2011–12 EuroLeague, Milan reached the Top16, but did not pass the round. Scariolo's team reached the national finals, but it was defeated 4–1 by Monte Paschi Siena. In the following season, Olimpia failed in reaching EuroLeague's Top16 and was once again defeated 4–3 by Siena in the playoffs' quarterfinals and Scariolo resigned from his post.

In June 2013, Scariolo became the head coach of Laboral Kutxa, a club which he had already coached during the late 1990s. However, after poor results both in national and European competitions, he was fired at the end of the 2013–14 season.

=== NBA champion with the Toronto Raptors (2018–2021) ===
On July 25, 2018, Scariolo was hired by the Toronto Raptors as an assistant coach, aiding them to win their first NBA championship. Scariolo became the first Italian coach and the second Italian ever, after the shooting guard Marco Belinelli, to become an NBA champion. On 26 February 2021, Scariolo served as interim head coach of the Raptors for a game against the Houston Rockets after head coach Nick Nurse and five assistants missed the game due to the NBA's health and safety protocols; Toronto won the game 122–111. Raptors point guard Kyle Lowry collected the game ball after the game and presented it to Scariolo as a memento.

=== EuroCup champion with Virtus Bologna (2021–2023) ===
On 18 June 2021, Scariolo signed a three-year deal with Virtus Bologna, of the Italian Lega Basket Serie A (LBA). On 21 September, the team won the second Supercup in its history, defeating Olimpia Milano 90–84. Moreover, after having ousted Lietkabelis, Ulm and Valencia in the first three rounds of the playoffs, on 11 May 2022, Virtus defeated Frutti Extra Bursaspor by 80–67 at the Segafredo Arena, winning its first EuroCup and qualifying for the EuroLeague after 14 years. However, despite having ended the regular season at the first place and having ousted 3–0 both Pesaro and Tortona in the first two rounds of playoffs, Virtus was defeated 4–2 in the national finals by Olimpia Milan.

On 29 September 2022, after having ousted Olimpia Milano in the semifinals, Virtus won its third Supercup, defeating 72–69 Banco di Sardegna Sassari and achieving a back-to-back, following the 2021 trophy. However, despite good premises Virtus ended the EuroLeague season at the 14th place, thus it did not qualify for the playoffs. Moreover, the team was defeated in the Italian Basketball Cup final by Brescia. In June, after having ousted 3–0 both Brindisi and Tortona, Virtus was defeated 4–3 by Olimpia Milan in the national finals, following a series which was widely regarded among the best in the latest years of Italian basketball.

On 15 September, just a few weeks before the season start, Scariolo was fired following controversial statements regarding the new roster and the upcoming season.

=== Return to Real Madrid (2025–2026) ===
On 3 July 2025, Scariolo signed a three-year deal with Real Madrid, returning to the Spanish powerhouse after 23 years. Under Scariolo, Real Madrid reached the EuroLeague final, where they lost to Olympiacos. Following an unsuccessful season in which Real Madrid went trophyless for the first time since 2010–11 season, the club and Scariolo mutually agreed to part ways.

== National team career ==
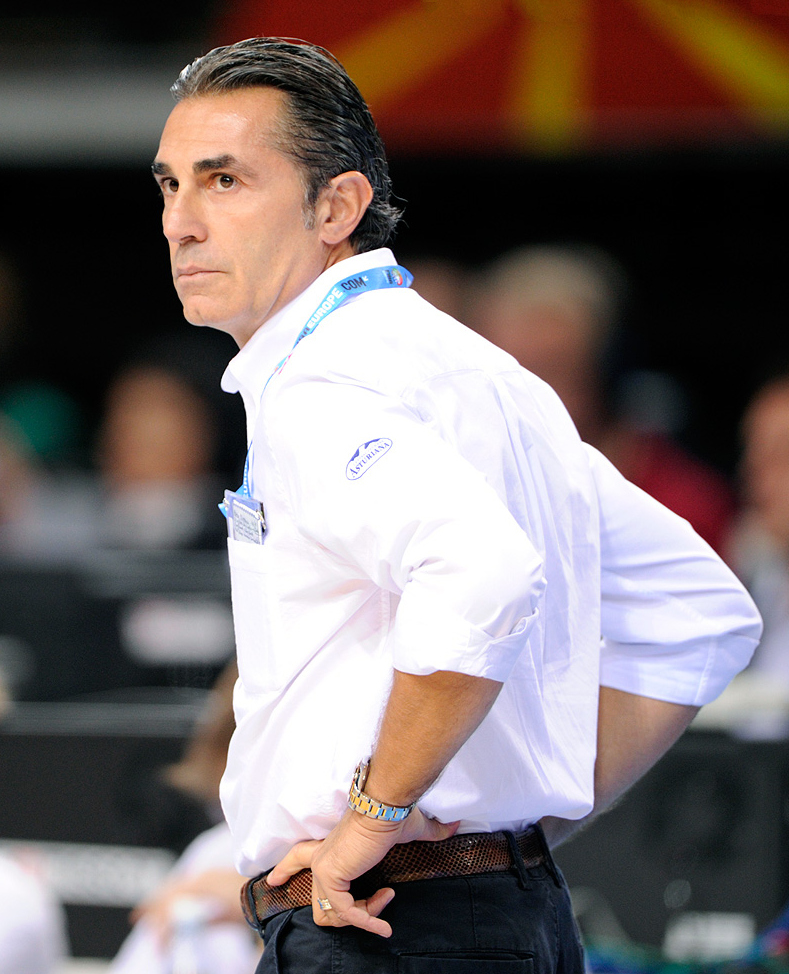
Scariolo at EuroBasket 2011

Scariolo served two times as head coach of the Spanish national team: from 2009 to 2012 and from 2015 to 2025. Under Scariolo, Spain won the gold medal at the EuroBasket 2009, EuroBasket 2011, the EuroBasket 2015 and the EuroBasket 2022, and the bronze medal at EuroBasket 2017. He also won the silver medal at the 2012 Summer Olympics and the bronze medal at the 2016 Summer Olympics. He also coached Spain at the 2010 FIBA World Championship. In 2019, Scariolo led Spain to victory in the FIBA Basketball World Cup.

In October 2020, Scariolo announced that he will remain as head coach of the team through the 2024 Summer Olympics.

For his service, he was awarded with the Gold Medal (2015) and the Grand Cross (2025) of the Royal Order of Sports Merit.

== Personal life ==
Scariolo is married to Blanca Ares, a former Spanish basketball player. The couple has two children: Alessandro, who also plays basketball, and Carlota. Scariolo is an avid fan of Inter Milan.

Sergio Scariolo appeared in the Netflix film Hustle, produced by LeBron James and Adam Sandler, who was the co-star along with Juancho Hernangómez, which was released on 8 June 2022. In the movie, Scariolo portrayed himself as the head coach of Spanish national team.

== Coaching record ==
Legend
| G | Games coached | W | Games won | L | Games lost | W–L % | Win-loss % |

Note: The EuroLeague is not the only competition in which the team played during the season. He also coached in domestic competition, and regional competition if applicable.

| Team | Year | G | W | L | W–L% | Result |
|---|---|---|---|---|---|---|
| Scavolini Pesaro | 1990–91 | 18 | 10 | 8 | .556 | Lost in 3rd place game |
| Teamsystem Bologna | 1996–97 | 31 | 22 | 9 | .710 | Lost in Quarter-finals |
| Tau Cerámica | 1996–97 | 10 | 5 | 5 | .500 | Eliminated at Group stage |
| Real Madrid | 1999–00 | 28 | 15 | 13 | .536 | Eliminated at Top 16 Stage |
| Real Madrid | 2000–01 | 15 | 10 | 5 | .667 | Lost in Quarter-finals |
| Real Madrid | 2001–02 | 20 | 12 | 8 | .600 | Eliminated at Top 16 Stage |
| Unicaja Málaga | 2003–04 | 14 | 4 | 10 | .286 | Eliminated at Group stage |
| Unicaja Málaga | 2004–05 | 14 | 6 | 8 | .429 | Eliminated at Group stage |
| Unicaja Málaga | 2005–06 | 20 | 15 | 5 | .750 | Eliminated at Top 16 Stage |
| Unicaja Málaga | 2006–07 | 25 | 14 | 11 | .560 | Won in 3rd place game |
| Unicaja Málaga | 2007–08 | 20 | 13 | 7 | .650 | Eliminated at Top 16 Stage |
| BC Khimki | 2009–10 | 16 | 10 | 6 | .625 | Eliminated at Top 16 Stage |
| EA7 Milano | 2011–12 | 16 | 7 | 9 | .438 | Eliminated at Top 16 Stage |
| EA7 Milano | 2012–13 | 10 | 3 | 7 | .300 | Eliminated at Group stage |
| Laboral Kutxa | 2013–14 | 24 | 11 | 13 | .458 | Eliminated at Top 16 Stage |
| Virtus Segafredo Bologna | 2022–23 | 34 | 14 | 20 | .412 | Eliminated at Regular season |
| Real Madrid Baloncesto | 2025–26 | 44 | 28 | 16 | .636 | Lost in the final game |
| Career | | 359 | 199 | 160 | .554 | |

== See also ==
- List of FIBA EuroBasket winning head coaches
- List of foreign NBA coaches

Sporting positions
| Preceded by (United States) Mike Krzyzewski | FIBA World Cup; Winning Coach; 2019 | Succeeded by (Germany) Gordon Herbert |
