= Joseph Gomis =

French basketball player

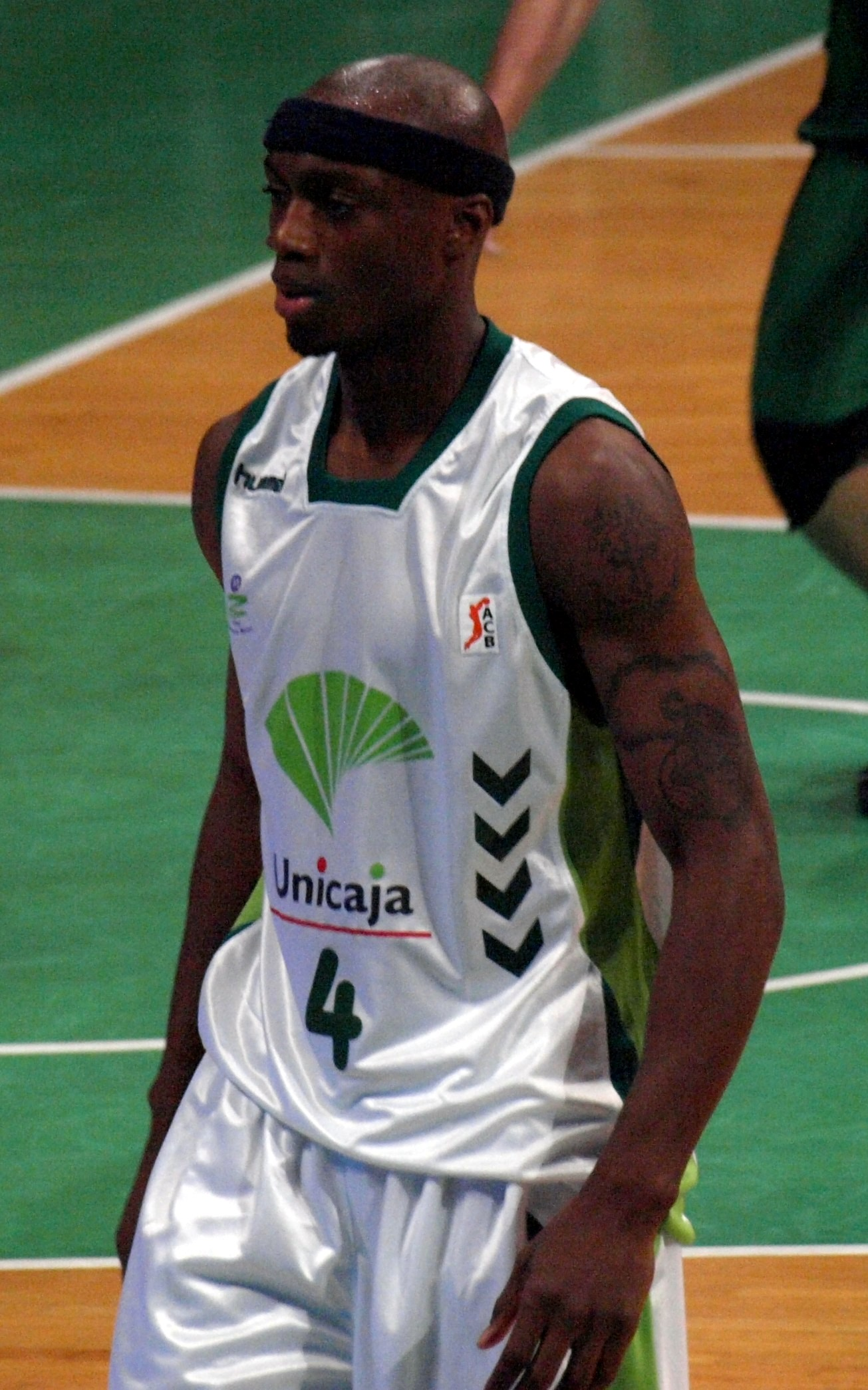
- Gomis with Unicaja Málaga

LDLC ASVEL
- Title: Head of player development
- League: LNB Élite; EuroLeague

Personal information
- Born: 2 July 1978 (age 48) Évreux, France
- Listed height: 1.80 m (5 ft 11 in)
- Listed weight: 76 kg (168 lb)

Career information
- NBA draft: 2000: undrafted
- Playing career: 1996–2015
- Position: Point guard

Career history
- 1996–2001: ALM Évreux
- 2001–2002: SLUC Nancy
- 2002–2005: Breogán
- 2005–2008: Valladolid
- 2008–2010: Unicaja Málaga
- 2010–2011: Spirou Charleroi
- 2011–2014: Limoges CSP
- 2014–2015: JSF Nanterre

Career highlights
- FIBA Korać Cup champion (2002); FIBA EuroChallenge champion (2015); French League champion (2014); French Supercup winner (2012); French 2nd Division champion (2012); French 2nd Division French Player's MVP (2012); Belgian League champion (2011)
Medals
Men's basketball
Representing France
European U-18 Championship
| Silver medal – second place | 1996 France | Under-18 |

Joseph Gomis (born 2 July 1978) is a French former professional basketball player who is currently the head of player development for LDLC ASVEL of the French LNB Élite and the EuroLeague.

== Professional career ==
Gomis started his professional career with ALM Évreux in 1996, playing there for five seasons. He spent the 2001–02 season with SLUC Nancy, winning the Korać Cup in its final edition.

Between 2002 and 2010, Gomis played in Spain for Breogán, Valladolid and Unicaja Málaga. For the 2010–11 season he signed with Spirou Charleroi of Belgium.

From 2011 to 2014 he played with Limoges CSP, winning the French championship in the 2013–14 season.

In June 2014, he signed with JSF Nanterre for the 2014–15 season.

On 27 August 2015 he retired from professional basketball.

== National team career ==
A member of the French junior national teams during the 1990s, Gomis represented France on two major tournaments, at the 2006 FIBA World Championship and EuroBasket 2007.
