= Josh Fisher (basketball) =

American basketball player and coach

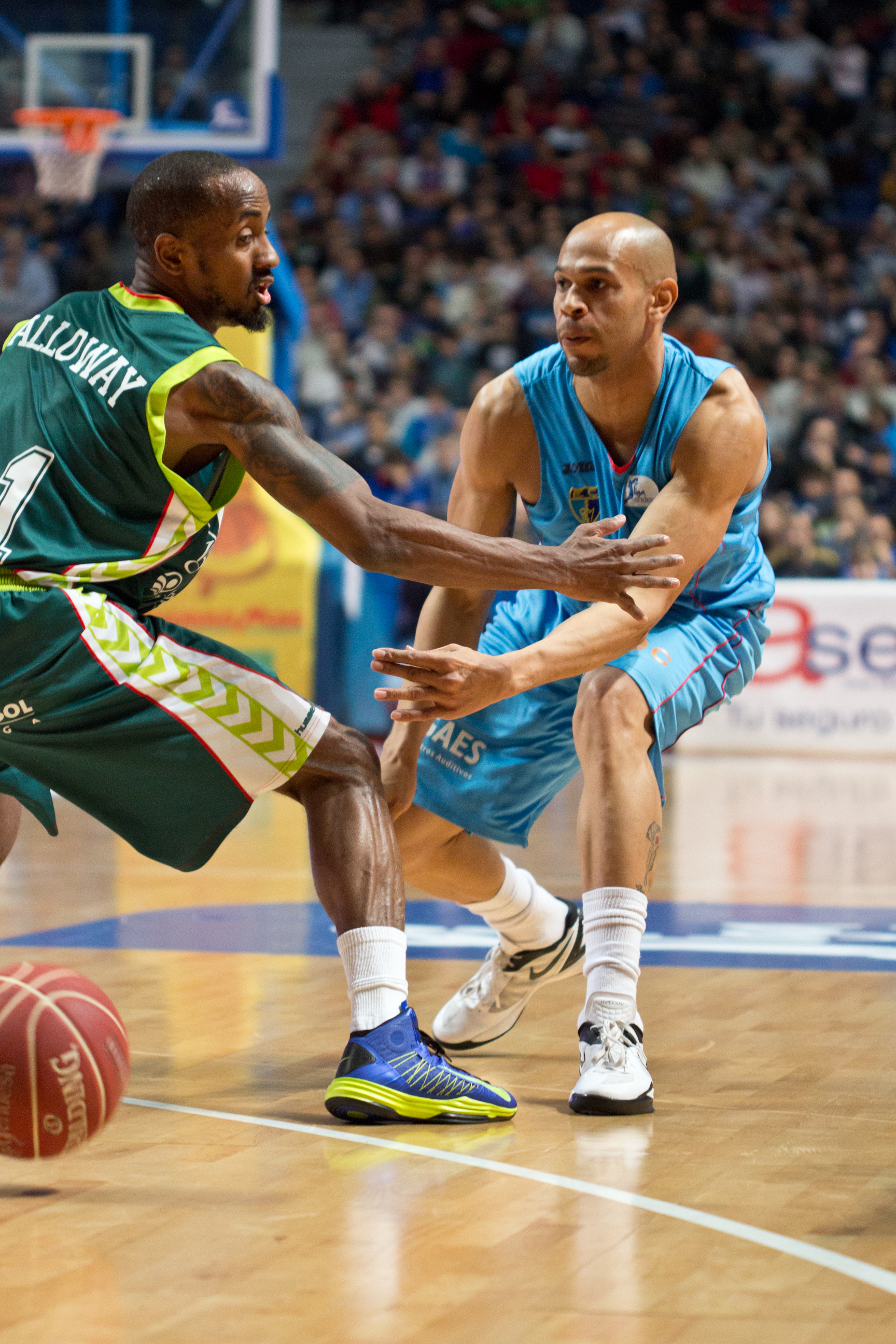

Personal information
- Born: October 24, 1980 (age 46) Washington, D.C., U.S.
- Listed height: 1.89 m (6 ft 2 in)
- Listed weight: 85 kg (187 lb)

Career information
- High school: Mercer Island (Mercer Island, Washington)
- College: Saint Louis (2000–2004)
- NBA draft: 2004: undrafted
- Playing career: 2004–2014
- Position: Point guard / shooting guard
- Coaching career: 2015–present

Career history

Playing
- 2004: Pamesa Castellón
- 2004–2005: Pamesa Valencia
- 2005: CAI Zaragoza
- 2005–2006: Farho Gijón
- 2006: Real Madrid
- 2006–2007: Polaris World Murcia
- 2007–2008: Etosa Alicante
- 2008–2010: CB Gran Canaria
- 2010–2011: Bizkaia Bilbao Basket
- 2011: Real Madrid
- 2011–2012: Bizkaia Bilbao Basket
- 2012–2013: Asefa Estudiantes
- 2013: Fujian Xunxing
- 2014: Panelefsiniakos

Coaching
- 2015–2016: UCAM Murcia (assistant)

Joshua Lee Fisher (born October 24, 1980) is an American former basketball player and current coach. He is a 1.89 m (6 ft 2 in) 85 kg (187 lb) guard. He also has Spanish citizenship.

== College career ==
Fisher played college basketball for the Saint Louis Billikens.

== Pro career ==
Fisher began his professional career in 2004 with the Spanish third division club Pamesa Castellón. He then joined the ACB club Pamesa Valencia later in 2004 for one month, before returning to Castellón. He then spent the next two seasons with second division clubs CAI Zaragoza and Farho Gijón before moving to ACB powerhouse Real Madrid for the second half of 2006.

He then spent half a season with Polaris World Murcia before moving to Etosa Alicante where they were relegated from the ACB at the end of 2007. Fisher remained for one more year with Alicante and then returned to the ACB where he spent two seasons with CB Gran Canaria until 2010, when he signed for Bizkaia Bilbao Basket. His spell in Bilbao lasted 3 games and then moved back to Real Madrid on a 3-month contract to replace the injured Pablo Prigioni, but returned to Bilbao until the end of the 2010–11 season, after his contract with Real Madrid expired.

On September 28, 2012, Fisher signed with Asefa Estudiantes.

In January 2014, he signed with Panelefsiniakos of the Greek Basket League for the rest of the 2013–14 season.

== Coach career ==
Fisher started his coach career in 2015 as assistant coach of Fotios Katsikaris at Spanish UCAM Murcia.
