= 2006–07 Euroleague =

Sports season

- The Olympic Indoor Hall in Athens hosted the Final Four
- Duration: October 24, 2006 – May 6, 2007
- Teams: 24

Regular season
- Season MVP: (Greece) Theo Papaloukas

Finals
- Champions: (Greece) Panathinaikos (4th title)
- Runners-up: (Russia) CSKA Moscow
- Third place: (Spain) Unicaja
- Fourth place: (Spain) Tau Cerámica
- Final Four MVP: (Greece) Dimitris Diamantidis

Statistical leaders
Points	(Spain) Juan Carlos Navarro 16.8 (Top Scorer) (Serbia) Igor Rakočević 16.2 (Alphonso Ford Top Scorer Trophy)	
Rebounds	(United States) Tanoka Beard	9.9
Assists	(Greece) Theo Papaloukas	5.4

The 2006–07 Euroleague was the 7th season of the professional basketball competition for elite clubs throughout Europe, organised by Euroleague Basketball Company, and it was the 50th season of the premier competition for European men's clubs overall. The season featured 24 competing teams from 13 countries.

The competition began on October 24, 2006, at the Olympic Pavilion in Badalona, Spain, with Panathinaikos winning 82-79 against DKV Joventut. The final of the competition was held on May 6, 2007, in the Olympic Indoor Hall in Athens, Greece, the home court of Panathinaikos, with Panathinaikos defeating the defending champions, CSKA Moscow, by a score of 93-91.

== Team allocation ==
=== Teams ===
The labels in the parentheses show how each team qualified for the place of its starting round (TH: EuroLeague title holders)

- Licensed clubs: 3-year licence
- 1st, 2nd, etc.: League position after Playoffs
- WC: Wild card

Regular season
Licensed clubs
(Spain) Unicaja Málaga (1st)	(Greece) Panathinaikos (1st)	(Slovenia) Union Olimpija (1st)
(Spain) Tau Cerámica (2nd)	(Greece) Olympiacos (2nd)	
(Spain) Winterthur Barcelona (3rd)	(Croatia) Cibona VIP (1st)	
(Turkey) Fenerbahçe Ülker (1st)	(France) Le Mans Sarthe (1st)	
(Turkey) Efes Pilsen (2nd)	(Israel) Maccabi Elite (1st)	
Associated clubs
(Italy) Benetton Treviso (1st)	(Russia) CSKA Moscow (1st)^{TH}	(Lithuania) Žalgiris (2nd)^{WC}
(Italy) Climamio Bologna (2nd)	(Russia) Dynamo Moscow (5th)^{WC}	(Poland) Prokom Trefl Sopot (1st)
(Italy) Eldo Napoli (3rd)	(France) Pau-Orthez (3rd)^{WC}	(Serbia) Partizan (1st)
(Italy) Lottomatica Roma (4th)	(Germany) RheinEnergie Köln (1st)	
(Spain) DKV Joventut (4th)	(Greece) Aris TT Bank (3rd)	

=== Venues and locations ===
As announced on the official Euroleague site.

Key to colors
Champion
Runner-up
Third place
Fourth place
Eliminated in Quarterfinals
Eliminated in Last 16
Eliminated in the regular season

Team	Location	Arena
Aris TT Bank	Thessaloniki, Greece	Alexandreio Melathron
Benetton Treviso	Treviso, Italy	Palaverde
Cibona VIP	Zagreb, Croatia	Dražen Petrović Basketball Hall
Climamio Bologna	Bologna, Italy	Land Rover Arena
CSKA Moscow	Moscow, Russia	CSKA Universal Sports Hall
DKV Joventut	Badalona, Spain	Palau Municipal d'Esports de Badalona
Dynamo Moscow	Moscow, Russia	Krylatskoe Sport Palace
Efes Pilsen	Istanbul, Turkey	Abdi İpekçi Arena
Eldo Napoli	Naples, Italy	PalaBarbuto
Fenerbahçe Ülker	Istanbul, Turkey	Abdi İpekçi Arena
Le Mans Sarthe	Le Mans, France	Antarès
Lottomatica Roma	Rome, Italy	PalaLottomatica
Maccabi Elite Tel Aviv	Tel Aviv, Israel	Nokia (Yad Eliyahu) Arena
Olympiacos	Piraeus, Greece	Peace and Friendship Stadium
Panathinaikos	Athens, Greece	Olympic Indoor Hall
Partizan	Belgrade, Serbia	Pionir Hall
Pau-Orthez	Pau, France	Palais des Sports de Pau
Prokom Trefl Sopot	Sopot, Poland	Olivia Sports Hall, Gdańsk
RheinEnergie Köln	Köln, Germany	Philips Halle
Tau Cerámica	Vitoria-Gasteiz, Spain	Fernando Buesa Arena
Unicaja	Málaga, Spain	José María Martín Carpena Arena
Union Olimpija	Ljubljana, Slovenia	Dvorana Tivoli
Winterthur FC Barcelona	Barcelona, Spain	Palau Blaugrana
Žalgiris	Kaunas, Lithuania	Kaunas Sports Hall

== Regular season ==
The first phase was a regular season, in which the competing teams were drawn into three groups, each containing eight teams. Each team played every other team in its group at home and away, resulting in 14 games for each team in the first stage. The top 5 teams in each group and the best sixth-placed team advanced to the next round. The complete list of tiebreakers was provided in the lead-in to the Regular Season results.

If one or more clubs were level on won-lost record, tiebreakers were applied in the following order:

1. Head-to-head record in matches between the tied clubs
2. Overall point difference in games between the tied clubs
3. Overall point difference in all group matches (first tiebreaker if tied clubs were not in the same group)
4. Points scored in all group matches
5. Sum of quotients of points scored and points allowed in each group match

Key to colors
Top five places in each group, plus highest-ranked sixth-place team, advanced to Top 16

=== Group A ===
	Team	Pld	W	L	PF	PA	Diff
1.	(Spain) Tau Cerámica	14	12	2	1165	1025	+140
2.	(Russia) Dynamo Moscow	14	10	4	1100	1032	+68
3.	(Greece) Olympiacos	14	10	4	1165	1112	+53
4.	(Turkey) Efes Pilsen	14	8	6	1081	1031	+50
5.	(Poland) Prokom Trefl Sopot	14	5	9	1021	1063	-42
6.	(Italy) Climamio Bologna	14	5	9	1115	1176	-61
7.	(France) Le Mans Sarthe	14	4	10	985	1041	-56
8.	(Germany) RheinEnergie Köln	14	2	12	1032	1184	-152

=== Group B ===
	Team	Pld	W	L	PF	PA	Diff
1.	(Greece) Panathinaikos	14	11	3	1128	1036	+92
2.	(Israel) Maccabi Elite Tel Aviv	14	8	6	1230	1177	+53
3.	(Spain) DKV Joventut	14	7	7	1112	1049	+63
4.	(Spain) Unicaja	14	7	7	1001	1085	-84
5.	(Italy) Lottomatica Roma	14	6	8	1027	1044	-17
6.	(Serbia) Partizan	14	6	8	1100	1093	+7
7.	(Croatia) Cibona VIP	14	6	8	1113	1141	-28
8.	(Slovenia) Union Olimpija	14	5	9	1038	1124	-86

=== Group C ===
	Team	Pld	W	L	PF	PA	Diff
1.	(Russia) CSKA Moscow	14	13	1	1079	912	+167
2.	(Spain) Winterthur FC Barcelona	14	9	5	1093	1032	+61
3.	(Italy) Benetton Treviso	14	8	6	1021	989	+32
4.	(France) Pau-Orthez	14	7	7	1059	1070	-11
5.	(Greece) Aris TT Bank	14	6	8	971	1013	-42
6.	(Italy) Eldo Napoli	14	6	8	1032	1093	-61
7.	(Turkey) Fenerbahçe Ülker	14	5	9	1044	1088	-44
8.	(Lithuania) Žalgiris	14	2	12	1062	1164	-102

== Top 16 ==
The surviving teams were divided into four groups of four teams each, and again a round robin system was adopted, resulting in 6 games each, with the two top teams advancing to the quarterfinals. Tiebreakers were identical to those used in the Regular Season.

The draw was held February 5, at 13:00 CET (1200 UTC) in Barcelona, in accordance with Euroleague rules.

The teams were placed into four pools, as follows:

Level 1: The three group winners, plus the top-ranked second-place team

- CSKA Moscow, Tau Cerámica, Panathinaikos, Dynamo Moscow

Level 2: The remaining second-place teams, plus the top two third-place teams

- Winterthur FC Barcelona, Maccabi Elite Tel Aviv, Olympiacos, Benetton Treviso

Level 3: The remaining third-place team, plus the three fourth-place teams

- DKV Joventut, Efes Pilsen, Pau-Orthez, Unicaja

Level 4: The fifth-place teams, plus the top ranked sixth-place team

- Lottomatica Roma, Aris TT Bank, Prokom Trefl Sopot, Partizan

Each Top 16 group included one team from each pool. The draw was conducted under the following restrictions:

1. No more than two teams from the same Regular Season group could be placed in the same Top 16 group.
2. No more than two teams from the same country could be placed in the same Top 16 group.
3. If there is a conflict between these two restrictions, (1) would receive priority.

Another draw was held to determine the order of fixtures. In the case of two teams from the same city in the Top 16 (CSKA Moscow and Dynamo Moscow, Panathinaikos and Olympiacos, FC Barcelona and Joventut Badalona) they were scheduled so that every week only one team would be at home.

Key to colors
Top two places in each group advanced to quarterfinals

=== Group D ===
	Team	Pld	W	L	PF	PA	Diff
1.	(Spain) Tau Cerámica	6	6	0	541	433	+108
2.	(Israel) Maccabi Elite Tel Aviv	6	4	2	463	478	−15
3.	(Italy) Lottomatica Roma	6	1	5	416	468	−52
4.	(France) Pau-Orthez	6	1	5	470	511	−41

=== Group E ===
	Team	Pld	W	L	PF	PA	Diff
1.	(Russia) CSKA Moscow	6	6	0	475	376	+99
2.	(Greece) Olympiacos	6	3	3	451	450	+1
3.	(Serbia) Partizan	6	2	4	432	474	−42
4.	(Spain) DKV Joventut	6	1	5	407	465	−58

=== Group F ===
	Team	Pld	W	L	PF	PA	Diff
1.	(Greece) Panathinaikos	6	5	1	501	428	+73
2.	(Spain) Winterthur FC Barcelona	6	4	2	498	455	+43
3.	(Turkey) Efes Pilsen	6	2	4	416	458	−42
4.	(Poland) Prokom Trefl Sopot	6	1	5	404	478	−74

=== Group G ===
	Team	Pld	W	L	PF	PA	Diff
1.	(Spain) Unicaja	6	4	2	448	442	+6
2.	(Russia) Dynamo Moscow	6	4	2	428	435	−7
3.	(Italy) Benetton Treviso	6	3	3	439	428	+11
4.	(Greece) Aris TT Bank	6	1	5	451	461	−10

*Unicaja won the group over Dynamo Moscow. The teams split their regular-season matches, but Unicaja scored 5 more points head-to-head.

== Quarterfinals ==
Each quarterfinal was a best-of-three series between a first-place team in the Top 16 and a second-place team from a different group, with the first-place team receiving home advantage. Quarterfinals were played on April 3 and 5, 2007, with third games to be played April 12 if necessary.

Team 1	Agg.	Team 2	1st leg	2nd leg	3rd leg
Tau Cerámica (Spain)	2–0	(Greece) Olympiacos	84–59	95–89	
CSKA Moscow (Russia)	2–1	(Israel) Maccabi Elite Tel Aviv	80–58	56–68	92-71
Panathinaikos (Greece)	2–0	(Russia) Dynamo Moscow	80–58	73–65	
Unicaja (Spain)	2–1	(Spain) Winterthur FC Barcelona	91–75	58–80	67-64

== Final four ==
=== Semifinals ===
May 4, Olympic Indoor Hall, Athens

Team 1	Score	Team 2
Unicaja (Spain)	50–62	(Russia) CSKA Moscow
Panathinaikos (Greece)	67–53	(Spain) Tau Cerámica

=== 3rd place game ===
May 6, Olympic Indoor Hall, Athens

Team 1	Score	Team 2
Unicaja (Spain)	76–74	(Spain) Tau Cerámica

=== Final ===
May 6, Olympic Indoor Hall, Athens

Team 1	Score	Team 2
Panathinaikos (Greece)	93–91	(Russia) CSKA Moscow

2006–07 Euroleague
Champions

Panathinaikos
4th Title

=== Final standings ===
	Team
	(Greece) Panathinaikos
2nd place, silver medalist(s)	(Russia) CSKA Moscow
3rd place, bronze medalist(s)	(Spain) Unicaja
	(Spain) Tau Cerámica

=== Final Four 2007 MVP ===
(Greece) Dimitris Diamantidis (Panathinaikos)

== Individual statistics ==
=== Rating ===
Rank	Name	Team	Games	Rating	PIR
1.	(Croatia) Nikola Vujčić	(Israel) Maccabi Elite Tel Aviv	22	478	21.73
2.	(Greece) Lazaros Papadopoulos	(Russia) Dynamo Moscow	17	345	20.29
3.	(United States) Eric Campbell	(France) Le Mans Sarthe	14	266	19.00

=== Points ===
Rank	Name	Team	Games	Rating	PPG
1.	(Spain) Juan Carlos Navarro (Top Scorer)	(Spain) Winterthur FC Barcelona	22	369	16.77
2.	(Serbia) Igor Rakočević (Alphonso Ford Top Scorer Trophy)	(Spain) Tau Cerámica	22	357	16.23
3.	(Israel) David Blu	(Italy) Climamio Bologna	14	224	16.00

=== Rebounds ===
Rank	Name	Team	Games	Rating	RPG
1.	(United States) Tanoka Beard	(Lithuania) Žalgiris	14	138	9.86
2.	(United States) James Thomas	(Italy) Climamio Bologna	13	128	9.85
3.	(United States) Brent Wright	(Croatia) Cibona VIP	14	112	8.00

=== Assists ===
Rank	Name	Team	Games	Rating	APG
1.	(Greece) Theo Papaloukas	(Russia) CSKA Moscow	25	135	5.40
2.	(Argentina) Pablo Prigioni	(Spain) Tau Cerámica	23	108	4.70
3.	(Greece) Nikos Zisis	(Italy) Benetton Treviso	20	86	4.30

=== Other stats ===
Category	Name	Team	Games	Stat
Steals per game	(Spain) Ricky Rubio	(Spain) DKV Joventut	16	3.19
Blocks per game	(United States) Marcus Haislip	(Turkey) Efes Pilsen	20	1.75
Turnovers per game	(United States) Brent Wright	(Croatia) Cibona VIP	14	3.14
Fouls drawn per game	(Greece) Lazaros Papadopoulos	(Russia) Dynamo Moscow	17	6.06
Minutes per game	(Croatia) Davor Kus	(Croatia) Cibona VIP	14	34:28
2FG%	(Greece) Ioannis Bourousis	(Greece) Olympiacos	19	0.764
3FG%	(Israel) David Blu	(Israel) Maccabi Elite Tel Aviv	14	0.533
FT%	(United States) Trajan Langdon	(Russia) CSKA Moscow	25	0.924

=== Game highs ===
Category	Name	Team	Stat
Rating	(Croatia) Nikola Vujčić	(Israel) Maccabi Elite Tel Aviv	46
Points	(Croatia) Nikola Vujčić	(Israel) Maccabi Elite Tel Aviv	33
Points	(United States) Marcus Haislip	(Turkey) Efes Pilsen	33
Rebounds	(Greece) Antonis Fotsis	(Russia) Dynamo Moscow	24
Assists	(Greece) Theo Papaloukas	(Russia) CSKA Moscow	12
Steals	(Italy) Stefano Mancinelli	(Italy) Climamio Bologna	10
Blocks	(United States) Marcus Haislip	(Turkey) Efes Pilsen	6
Turnovers	4 occasions		8
Fouls Drawn	(Serbia) Kosta Perović	(Serbia) Partizan	12
Fouls Drawn	(United States) Brent Wright	(Croatia) Cibona VIP	12

== Awards ==
=== Euroleague 2006–07 MVP ===
- (Greece) Theo Papaloukas, ( (Russia) CSKA Moscow)

=== Euroleague 2006–07 Final Four MVP ===
- (Greece) Dimitris Diamantidis, ( (Greece) Panathinaikos)

=== Euroleague 2006–07 Finals Top Scorer ===
- (Greece) Theo Papaloukas, ( (Russia) CSKA Moscow)

=== All-Euroleague Team 2006–07 ===
Position	All-Euroleague First Team	Club Team	All-Euroleague Second Team	Club Team
PG	(Greece) Theo Papaloukas * (Greece) Dimitris Diamantidis*	(Russia) CSKA Moscow (Greece) Panathinaikos	(Argentina) Pablo Prigioni	(Spain) Tau Cerámica
SG/SF	(Spain) Juan Carlos Navarro	(Spain) Winterthur FC Barcelona	(Serbia) Igor Rakočević	(Spain) Tau Cerámica
SG/SF	(United States) Trajan Langdon	(Russia) CSKA Moscow	(Lithuania) Ramūnas Šiškauskas	(Greece) Panathinaikos
PF/C	(Argentina) Luis Scola	(Spain) Tau Cerámica	(Slovenia) Matjaž Smodiš	(Russia) CSKA Moscow
PF/C	(Croatia) Nikola Vujčić	(Israel) Maccabi Elite Tel Aviv	(Greece) Lazaros Papadopoulos	(Russia) Dynamo Moscow

*A tie resulted in the voting for the best point guard of the season, between Dimitris Diamantidis and Theo Papaloukas. Consequently, the 2006–07 All-Euroleague First Team included six players.

=== Rising Star ===
- (Spain) Rudy Fernández ( (Spain) DKV Joventut)

=== Best Defender ===
- (Greece) Dimitris Diamantidis ( (Greece) Panathinaikos)

=== Top Scorer (Alphonso Ford Trophy) ===
- (Serbia) Igor Rakočević ( (Spain) Tau Ceramica)

=== Top Scorer (Points Per Game leader) ===
- (Spain) Juan Carlos Navarro ( (Spain) FC Barcelona)

=== Coach of the Year (Alexander Gomelsky Award) ===
- (Serbia) Željko Obradović ( (Greece) Panathinaikos)

=== Club Executive of the Year ===
- (Spain) Juan Manuel Rodríguez ( (Spain) Unicaja)

==== Regular season ====
Game	Player	Team	Rating
1	(Spain) Carlos Cabezas	(Spain) Unicaja	41
2	(United States) Eric Campbell	(France) Le Mans Sarthe	32
3	(Spain) Juan Carlos Navarro	(Spain) Winterthur FC Barcelona	35
4	(United States) Ronnie Burrell	(Germany) RheinEnergie Köln	36
5	(Finland) Teemu Rannikko	(Slovenia) Union Olimpija	33
6	(Croatia) Nikola Vujčić	(Israel) Maccabi Elite Tel Aviv	46
7	(United States) Brent Wright	(Croatia) Cibona VIP	35
8	(Greece) Lazaros Papadopoulos	(Russia) Dynamo Moscow	38
9	(United States) Marcus Haislip	(Turkey) Efes Pilsen	41
10	(Croatia) Nikola Vujčić (2)	(Israel) Maccabi Elite Tel Aviv	40
11	(United States) Tanoka Beard	(Lithuania) Žalgiris	31
12	(Croatia) Nikola Vujčić (3)	(Israel) Maccabi Elite Tel Aviv	34
12	(United States) James Thomas	(Italy) Climamio Bologna	34
13	(United States) Terrell Lyday	(Italy) Benetton Treviso	40
14	(France) Vassil Evtimov	(Italy) Climamio Bologna	38

==== Top 16 ====
Game	Player	Team	PIR
1	(United States) Scoonie Penn	(Greece) Olympiacos	35
1	(United States) Marcus Goree	(Italy) Benetton Treviso	35
2	(United States) Jamie Arnold	(Israel) Maccabi Elite Tel Aviv	29
3	(Greece) Savvas Iliadis	(Greece) Aris TT Bank	30
4	(Greece) Antonis Fotsis	(Russia) Dynamo Moscow	38
5	(United States) Michael Wright	(France) Pau-Orthez	31
6	(Greece) Antonis Fotsis (2)	(Russia) Dynamo Moscow	39

==== Playoffs ====
Game	Player	Team	PIR
1-2	(Spain) Juan Carlos Navarro (2)	(Spain) Winterthur FC Barcelona	23
3	(Greece) Theo Papaloukas	(Russia) CSKA Moscow	27

=== MVP of the Month ===
Month	Player	Team
November 2006	(United States) Mike Batiste	(Greece) Panathinaikos
December 2006	(Argentina) Luis Scola	(Spain) Tau Ceramica
January 2007	(Greece) Lazaros Papadopoulos	(Russia) Dynamo Moscow
February 2007	(Slovenia) Matjaž Smodiš	(Russia) CSKA Moscow
March 2007	(Puerto Rico) Daniel Santiago	(Spain) Unicaja
April 2007	(Lithuania) Ramūnas Šiškauskas	(Greece) Panathinaikos

== References and notes ==
Euroleague Competition Format
