= Kosta Perović =

Serbian basketball player (born 1985)

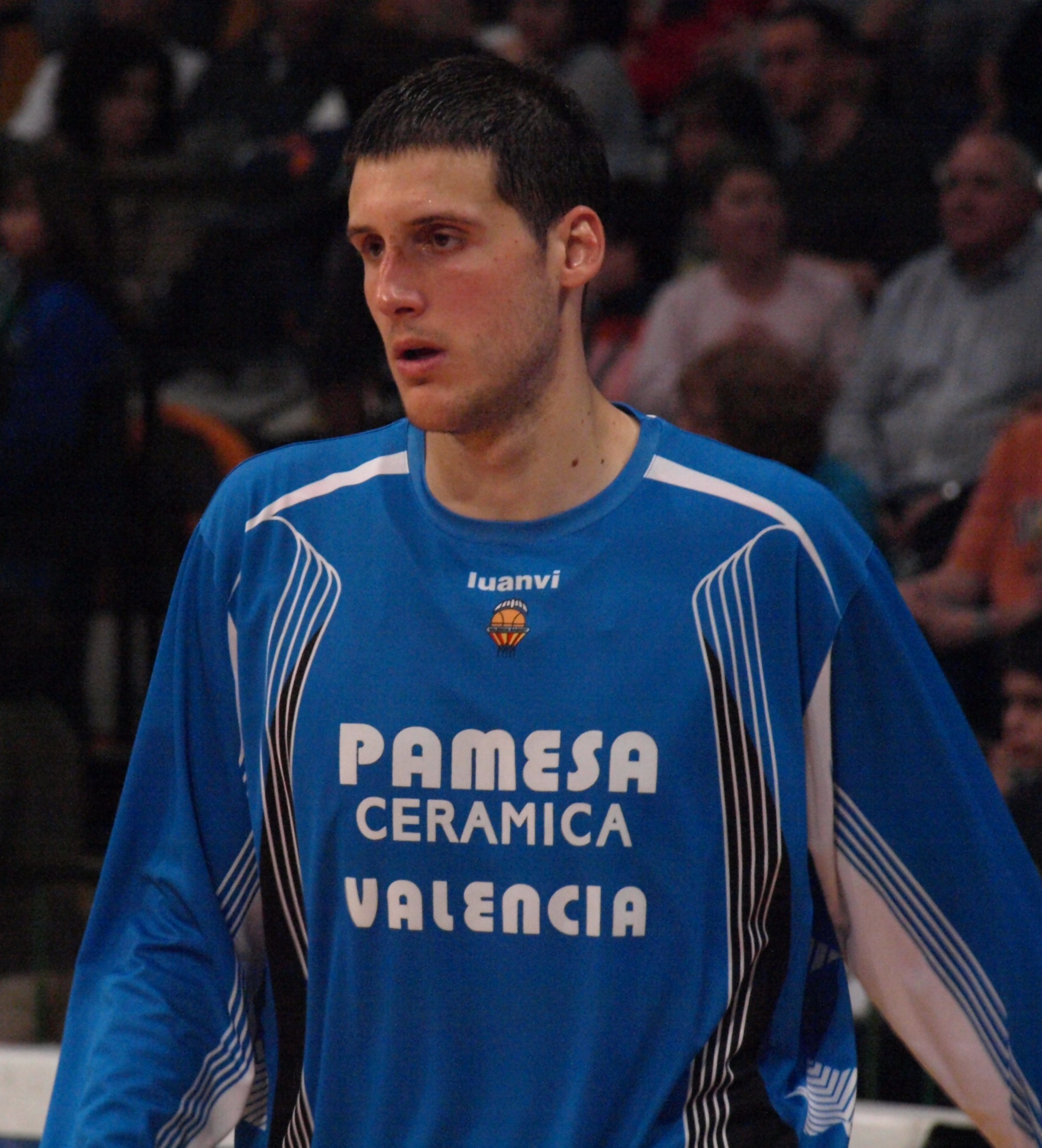
- Perović warming up with Valencia in 2009

Personal information
- Born: February 19, 1985 (age 41) Osijek, SR Croatia, SFR Yugoslavia
- Listed height: 2.17 m (7 ft 1 in)
- Listed weight: 118 kg (260 lb)

Career information
- NBA draft: 2006: 2nd round, 38th overall pick
- Drafted by: Golden State Warriors
- Playing career: 2000–2015
- Position: Center
- Number: 7, 13, 17, 19

Career history
- 2000–2002: Beopetrol
- 2002–2007: Partizan
- 2007–2008: Golden State Warriors
- 2007–2008: →Bakersfield Jam
- 2008–2010: Valencia
- 2010–2012: Barcelona
- 2012–2013: Málaga
- 2013–2015: Enisey
- 2015: Partizan

Career highlights
- Eurocup champion (2010); Adriatic League champion (2007); Basketball League of Serbia champion (2007); 4× Serbia and Montenegro League champion (2003–2006); 2× ACB League champion (2011, 2012); Spanish Cup champion (2011); 2× Spanish Supercup champion (2010, 2011)
- Stats at NBA.com
- Stats at Basketball Reference
Medals
Representing Serbia
EuroBasket
| Silver medal – second place | 2009 Poland | Team |
Representing FR Yugoslavia
European Championship for Cadets
| Gold medal – first place | 2001 Latvia | Team |

Kosta Perović (Serbian Cyrillic: Коста Перовић; born February 19, 1985) is a Serbian former professional basketball player. He represented the Serbian national basketball team internationally. In the 2006 NBA draft he was a second-round selection of the NBA's Golden State Warriors, with whom he signed on August 3, 2007. A 2.17 m (7 ft 1 in) center, Perović was the tallest player taken in the 2006 NBA Draft. His game has been compared to that of Slovenian center Radoslav Nesterović.

== Professional career ==
=== Europe ===
Perović was born in Osijek, SR Croatia, in the former Yugoslavia. He played basketball professionally for Partizan Belgrade at the time of his being drafted by the Golden State Warriors.

After being drafted in 2006, Perović did not immediately come to the NBA. Rather, he played the 2006–07 season in the Serbian League.

=== NBA ===
On August 3, 2007, Perović was signed to a two-year contract worth about US$3.5 million with a team option for a third season by Golden State. On November 18, 2007, he was assigned to the NBA D-League after going without an appearance in Golden State's first seven games. He played for the Warriors' affiliate team, the Bakersfield Jam until January 6, 2008, when he was recalled to the Warriors' squad after they waived D. J. Mbenga.

Perović played his first minutes in an NBA game with the Warriors on January 19, 2008, against the Milwaukee Bucks, in which he scored 4 points (on 2 of 2 field goal shooting) and 4 grabbed rebounds (2 offensive), as well as blocking a shot. In 7 games in the NBA, he averaged 1.4 points and 1.9 rebounds per game.

=== Spanish teams ===
After being waived by the Warriors on September 12, 2008, Perović reportedly signed a three-year deal worth €3.3 million net income with Pamesa Valencia of the Spanish ACB. After a mutual termination of the contract with Pamesa Valencia in June 2010, Perović signed with FC Barcelona Bàsquet. In the 2009–2010 season, he averaged 8.4 points and 4.9 rebounds per game.

On August 19, 2012, he signed a one-year deal with the Spanish club Unicaja Málaga.

=== Russia ===
In August 2013, Perović signed a one-year deal with Yenisey Krasnoyarsk of Russia. In July 2014, he extended his contract with Yenisey for one more season. In December 2014, he got injured and missed the rest of the season.

=== Return to Partizan and retirement ===
On September 29, 2015, he returned to Partizan Belgrade. Struggling to return to his previous form after few months of absence due to a knee injury, he retired from professional basketball on December 15, 2015. He appeared in 12 games of the ABA League, averaging 3.1 points and 2.1 rebounds per game.

== National team career ==
Perović played for the FR Yugoslavian U16 national team at the 2001 European Championship and won a gold medal. He began his senior national team career at the EuroBasket 2003 when Serbia and Montenegro finished with 6th place. Perović has also been a member of the senior men's Serbian national basketball team. With them he won the silver medal at the EuroBasket 2009. In the following year, he was member of team that finished 4th at the World Championship in Turkey. At the EuroBasket 2011 in Lithuania, where he was capped, Serbia finished 8th.

== Post-playing career ==
Perović owns and operates a cherry orchard and a plantation of organic ethereal herbs.

== Career statistics ==
Legend
| GP | Games played | GS | Games started | MPG | Minutes per game |
| FG% | Field-goal percentage | 3P% | 3-point field-goal percentage | FT% | Free-throw percentage |
| RPG | Rebounds per game | APG | Assists per game | SPG | Steals per game |
| BPG | Blocks per game | PPG | Points per game | PIR | Performance index rating |
| **Bold** | Career high |

=== Euroleague ===
| Year | Team | GP | GS | MPG | FG% | 3P% | FT% | RPG | APG | SPG | BPG | PPG | PIR |
|---|---|---|---|---|---|---|---|---|---|---|---|---|---|
| 2002–03 | Partizan | 12 | 2 | 13.2 | .444 | .000 | **.786** | 3.3 | .5 | .3 | .9 | 4.5 | 1.2 |
| 2003–04 | Partizan | 9 | 2 | 22.0 | .491 | .000 | .533 | 4.0 | 1.0 | .4 | .7 | 6.9 | 6.2 |
| 2004–05 | Partizan | 12 | 9 | 25.9 | .432 | .000 | .623 | 4.7 | .9 | 1.3 | .9 | 9.1 | 9.0 |
| 2005–06 | Partizan | 13 | 13 | **26.3** | .505 | .000 | .672 | 4.4 | .4 | **1.8** | .6 | 10.4 | 11.2 |
| 2006–07 | Partizan | 20 | **16** | **26.3** | .500 | .000 | .718 | **6.3** | **1.4** | 1.2 | **1.1** | **10.8** | **15.2** |
| 2010–11 | FC Barcelona | 17 | 8 | 12.4 | **.610** | .000 | .694 | 3.0 | .3 | .4 | .5 | 5.7 | 6.8 |
| 2011–12 | FC Barcelona | 20 | 11 | 13.2 | .531 | .000 | **.786** | 3.3 | .5 | .3 | .9 | 4.5 | 6.6 |
| 2012–13 | Unicaja Málaga | **21** | 2 | 9.3 | .439 | .000 | .731 | 2.2 | .2 | .2 | .2 | 3.3 | 4.6 |
| **Career** | | 124 | 63 | 17.5 | .495 | .000 | .683 | 3.7 | .6 | .7 | .7 | 6.5 | 7.8 |

=== NBA ===
| Year | Team | GP | GS | MPG | FG% | 3P% | FT% | RPG | APG | SPG | BPG | PPG |
|---|---|---|---|---|---|---|---|---|---|---|---|---|
| 2007–08 | Golden State | 7 | 0 | 5.4 | .300 | .000 | .667 | 1.9 | .1 | .0 | .3 | 1.4 |
| **Career** | | 7 | 0 | 5.4 | .300 | .000 | .667 | 1.9 | .1 | .0 | .3 | 1.4 |

== See also ==
- List of Serbian NBA players
