= John Goldsberry =

American basketball player

Personal information
- Born: October 19, 1982 (age 44) Vandalia, Ohio, U.S.
- Listed height: 6 ft 3 in (1.91 m)
- Listed weight: 183 lb (83 kg)

Career information
- High school: Butler (Vandalia, Ohio)
- College: UNC Wilmington (2002–2006)
- NBA draft: 2006: undrafted
- Playing career: 2006–2014
- Position: Point guard / shooting guard
- Number: 5

Career history
- 2006–2007: Giants Leverkusen
- 2007–2008: Artland Dragons
- 2008–2014: Brose Bamberg

Career highlights
- 4× German League champion (2010–2013); 4× German Cup winner (2008, 2010–2012); 3× German Supercup winner (2010–2012); No. 5 retired by Brose Baskets (2014); First-team All-CAA (2005)

John Goldsberry (born October 19, 1982) is an American former professional basketball player who played for Giants Leverkusen, Artland Dragons and Brose Baskets of the German Basketball Bundesliga. Standing at 1.91 m (6 ft 3 in) in height, he played at the point guard and shooting guard positions.

== High school ==
Goldsberry attended Butler High School, in Vandalia, Ohio, where he played basketball.

== College career ==
After high school, Goldsberry played NCAA Division I college basketball at North Carolina-Wilmington, where he played with the UNC Wilmington Seahawks, from 2002 to 2006.

== Professional career ==
Goldsberry began his pro career in 2006 with the German League club Giants Leverkusen. In 2007, he moved to the German club Artland Dragons. In 2008, he joined the German club Brose Baskets Bamberg. He re-signed with Brose in 2013. In May 2014, Goldsberry, along with his longtime teammate Casey Jacobsen, retired from the professional basketball, spending last six seasons of his career with Brose Baskets. In tribute to him, Brose Baskets retired his 5 jersey number in 2014.

== Awards and accomplishments ==
=== College ===
- All-CAA First Team: (2005)

=== Pro career ===
- 4× German League Champion: (2010, 2011, 2012, 2013)
- 4× German Cup Winner: (2008, 2010, 2011, 2012)
- 3× German Supercup Winner: (2010, 2011, 2012)
- Number 5 jersey retired by Brose Baskets: (2014)
