= Berni Rodríguez =

Spanish basketball player

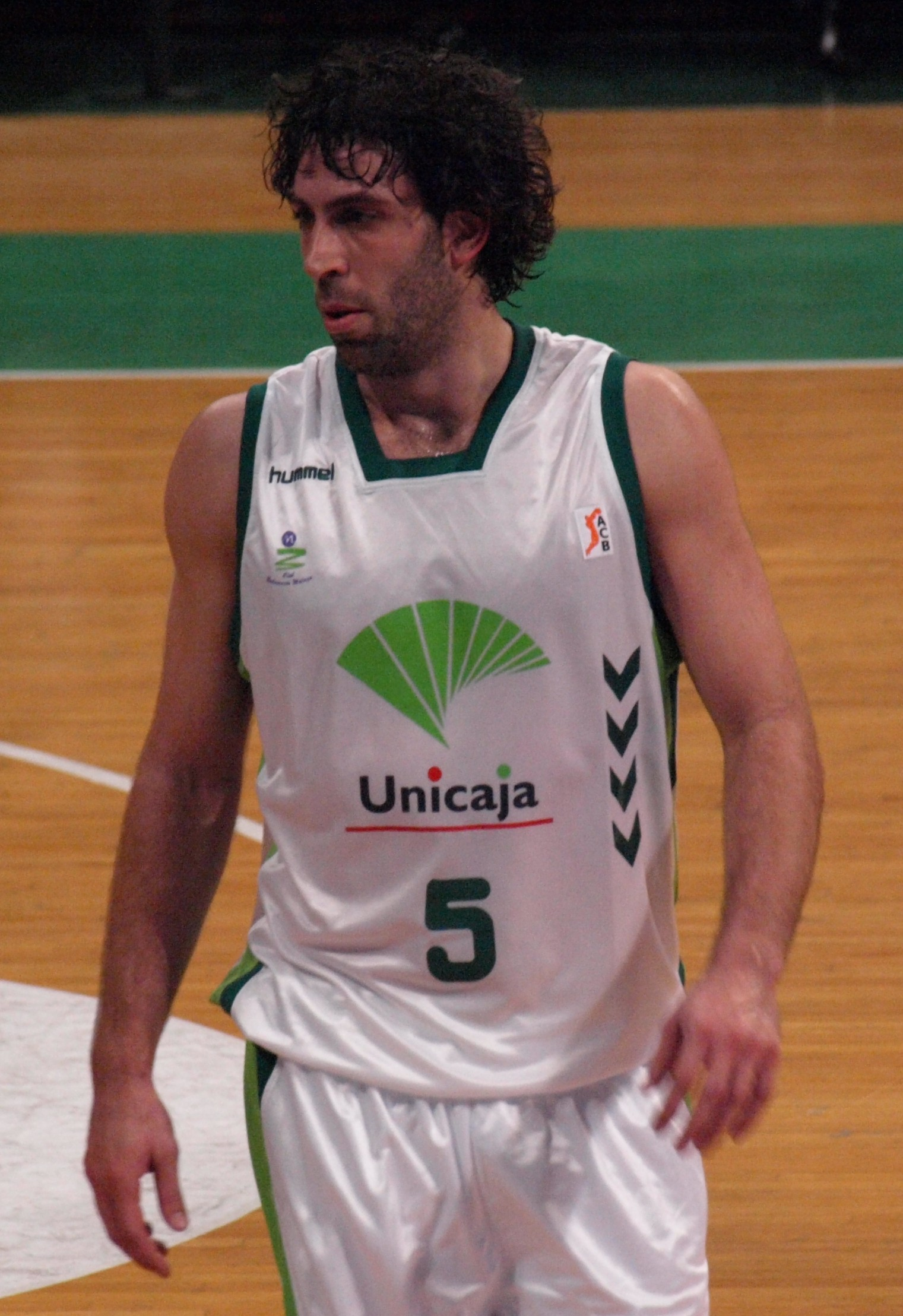
- Rodríguez with Unicaja Málaga, in 2009.

Personal information
- Born: 7 June 1980 (age 46) Málaga, Andalusia, Spain
- Listed height: 6 ft 5.75 in (1.97 m)
- Listed weight: 205 lb (93 kg)

Career information
- NBA draft: 2002: undrafted
- Playing career: 1998–2016
- Position: Shooting guard / small forward
- Number: 5

Career history
- 1998–2012: Unicaja
- 1998–1999: →Unicaja Macías
- 2012–2014: Murcia
- 2014–2016: Baloncesto Sevilla

Career highlights
- FIBA Korać Cup champion (2001); Spanish League champion (2006); Spanish Cup winner (2005); No. 5 retired by Unicaja Málaga
Medals
Representing Spain
Men's basketball
Summer Olympics
Silver medal – second place	2008 Beijing
FIBA World Cup
Gold medal – first place	2006 Japan
EuroBasket
Silver medal – second place	2007 Spain	Spain
FIBA Under-19 World Cup
Gold medal – first place	1999 Portugal	U-19 Team
FIBA Europe Under-20 Championship
Bronze medal – third place	2000 Macedonia	U-20 Team
FIBA Europe Under-18 Championship
Gold medal – first place	1998 Bulgaria	U-18 Team

Bernardo Rodríguez Arias, nicknamed Berni Rodríguez (Spanish pronunciation: [ˈbeɾni roˈðɾiɣeθ]; born 7 June 1980) is a Spanish retired professional basketball player. He is 1.97 m (6 ft 5 ¾ in) tall.

== Professional career ==
Rodríguez began his men's club career with Unicaja Macias of the Liga EBA (Spanish 4th division), the farm team of Unicaja Málaga, during the 1998–99 season. He then moved to the senior club of Unicaja Málaga of the top-level Spanish ACB League, for the 1999–00 season.

In June 2012, after 13 seasons with Málaga, Rodríguez left Unicaja Malaga. The club decided to retire his number 5 jersey.

A month and a half later, he signed with the Spanish League club UCAM Murcia, where he decided to play with the number 41, out of respect to his old number 5 at Málaga.

In July 2016, Rodríguez announced his retirement from playing professional basketball.

== National team career ==
Rodríguez played internationally with the senior Spain national team that won the gold medal at the 2006 FIBA World Championship. With Spain, he also won the silver medal at the 2007 EuroBasket, and the silver medal at the 2008 Summer Olympics.

== After retirement ==
Five days after announcing his retirement from playing professional club basketball, Rodríguez signed on as the sporting director of the Spanish League club Baloncesto Sevilla, which was the last club that he played at.
