= Jacopo Giachetti =

Italian basketball player (born 1983)

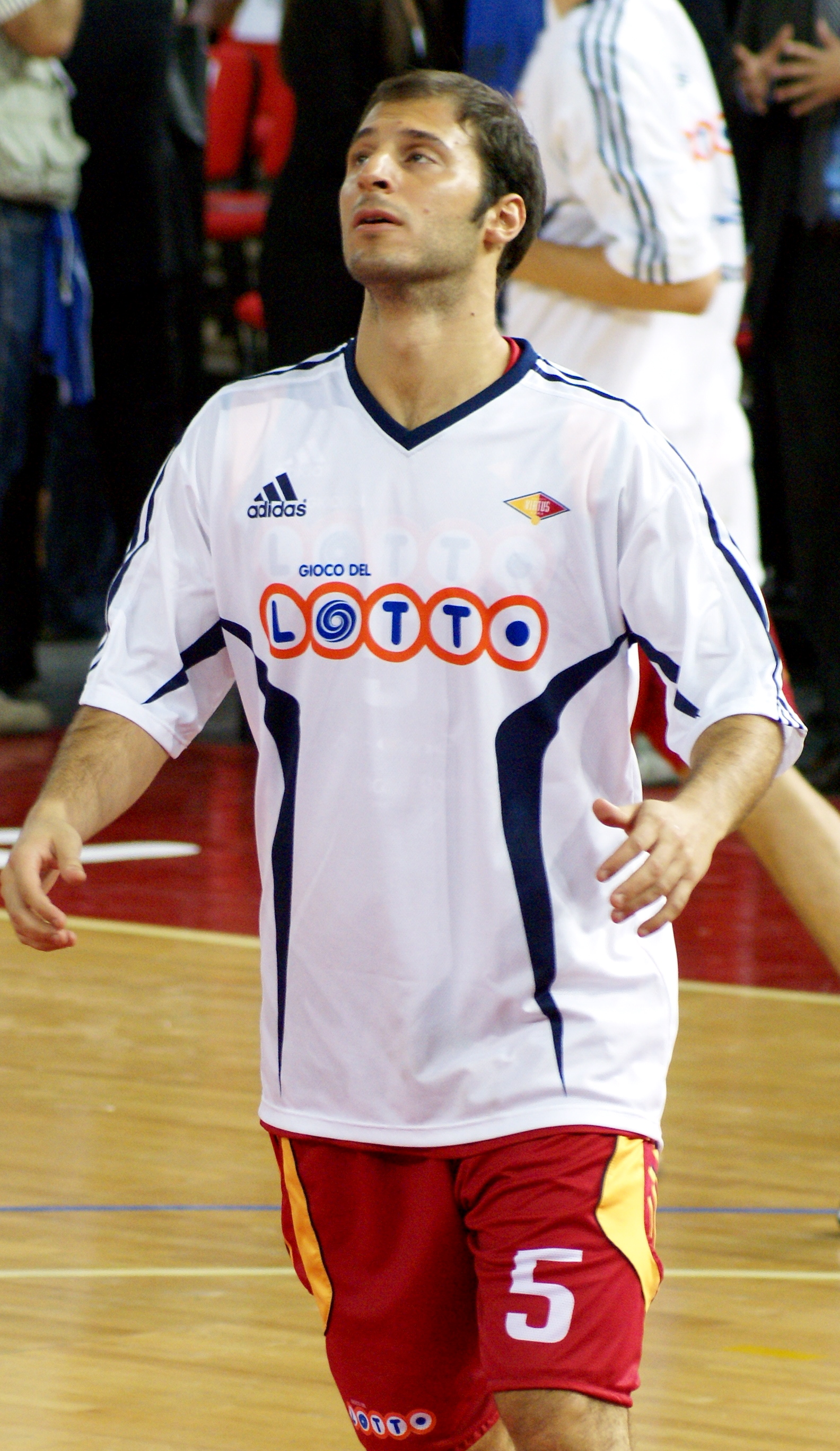
- Giachetti warming-up with Lottomatica Roma

No. 5 – Unieuro Forlì
- Position: Point guard

Personal information
- Born: December 7, 1983 (age 42) Pisa, Italy
- Listed height: 6 ft 3 in (1.91 m)
- Listed weight: 181 lb (82 kg)

Career information
- Playing career: 1999–present

Career history
- 1999–2000: SC Montecatini
- 2000–2004: Basket Livorno
- 2004–2011: Lottomatica Roma
- 2011–2013: Emporio Armani Milano
- 2013–2014: Reyer Venezia Mestre
- 2014–2017: Auxilium Torino
- 2017–present: Basket Ravenna Piero Manetti
Medals
Men's basketball
Representing Italy
Mediterranean Games
Gold medal – first place	2005 Almería	Team competition

Jacopo Giachetti (born December 7, 1983) is an Italian basketball player for Basket Ravenna Piero Manetti. A 190 cm (6 ft 3 in) point guard, he was born in Pisa, Italy.

== Professional career ==
Giachetti spent most of his career with Lottomatica Roma. On June 27, 2008, he signed a multi-year contract extension with the team. In July 2011, he signed a two-year contract with Olimpia Milano. In the summer of 2013, he signed with Reyer Venezia Mestre.

In August 2014, he signed with PMS Torino. In August 2017, Serie A2 Team Basket Ravenna Piero Manetti announced that for the season 2017-2018 Giacchetti will join the team.
