= Brent Wright =

American professional basketball player (born 1978)

Personal information
- Born: May 6, 1978 (age 48) Miami, Florida
- Listed height: 6 ft 8 in (2.03 m)
- Listed weight: 236 lb (107 kg)

Career information
- High school: Miami Senior (Miami, Florida)
- College: Florida (1997–2001)
- NBA draft: 2001: undrafted
- Playing career: 2001–2014
- Position: Power forward

Career history
- 2001–2002: Greenville Groove
- 2002: Celana Basket Bergamo
- 2002–2003: Maccabi Haifa
- 2003–2004: Plannja Basket
- 2004–2005: BK Ventspils
- 2005–2006: BC Oostende
- 2006–2007: Cibona Zagreb
- 2007–2008: Ural Great Perm
- 2008–2009: BC Kyiv
- 2009: Cibona Zagreb
- 2010: Zob Ahan Esfahan
- 2010–2011: Spirou Charleroi
- 2011–2014: BC Oostende

Career highlights
- 6× Belgian champion (2006, 2010–2014); Croatian champion (2007); Latvian champion (2005); ULEB Cup regular season MVP (2005); LBL All Star Game (2005); Swedish champion (2004)

Brindley Lambert Wright (born May 6, 1978) is an American former professional basketball player.

== Playing career ==
Wright did not play organized basketball until 1993–94. He was a Top-35 recruit in the country coming out of Miami Senior High School.

He played college basketball at the University of Florida from 1997 to 2001. Wright played for Gators team that made NCAA Tournament three straight times. He was part of Florida Gators team that made 2000 NCAA Final Four.

He sued Nike after his Nike Maxair shoe ripped open during a game against Mississippi on February 21, 2001. The suit claimed the defected shoe caused permanent damage to Wright's right foot limiting his earning capacity as a professional basketball player.

Brent made a name in Europe playing with Latvian team BK Ventspils when he was named ULEB Cup regular season MVP in 2005 and helped his team to make quarterfinals of that competition. He also helped Ventspils to win Latvian championship. During the season in Ventspils there were talks about Wright seeking Latvian citizenship and playing for Latvian National Team, but plans never materialized.

He also enjoyed success in next seasons as he won championships in other countries and played in the Euroleague.

== Personal ==
He has 18 brothers and sisters.
