= Eurocup Basketball 2009–10 Last 16 =

Standings and results of the Last 16 of the Eurocup Basketball 2009–10 basketball tournament.

Key to colors
Top two places in each group advance to quarterfinals
Eliminated

All times given below are in Central European Time.

== Group I ==
	Team	Pld	W	L	PF	PA	Diff	Tie-break
1.	(Germany) ALBA Berlin	6	4	2	419	409	+10	
2.	(Greece) Aris BSA 2003	6	3	3	447	407	+40	1–1 +28
3.	(Spain) DKV Joventut	6	3	3	408	431	–23	1–1 –28
4.	(France) Le Mans	6	2	4	420	447	–27	

Game 1

26 January 2010
20:30

Report

Le Mans (France)	63–68	(Germany) ALBA Berlin
Scoring by quarter: 14-17, 12-16, 13-18, 24-17
Pts: Batista 18; Rebs: Wright 9 Asts: Salyers 4		Pts: Jenkins 27; Rebs: Dojčin, Sekulić 8 Asts: Golemac, Wright, McElroy 3

Antarès
Attendance: 3,300
Referees: José Ramón García Ortiz (ESP), Oscar Perea (ESP), Renaud Geller (BEL)

26 January 2010
20:45

Report

DKV Joventut (Spain)	74–72	(Greece) Aris BSA 2003
Scoring by quarter: 26-11, 22-25, 14-18, 12-18
Pts: Tripković 13; Rebs: Koffi 8 Asts: Valters 6		Pts: Richardson 17; Rebs: Kakiouzis 10; Asts: Clark 5

Palau Municipal d'Esports de Badalona
Attendance: 3,683
Referees: Paolo Taurino (ITA), Luís Lopes (POR), Radomir Vojinović (MNE)

Game 2

2 February 2010
20:00

Report

ALBA Berlin (Germany)	72–68	(Spain) DKV Joventut
Scoring by quarter: 21-15, 12-14, 20-18, 19-21
Pts: Sekulić 19; Rebs: Golemac, Wright 5 Asts: Dojčin, Wright, McElroy 3		Pts: Tucker 15; Rebs: Hernández-Sonseca 6 Asts: Tucker 4

O2 World
Attendance: 9,332
Referees: Costas Mouzakis (GRE), Oscar Lefwerth (SWE), Marcin Kowalski (POL)

2 February 2010
20:00

Report

Aris BSA 2003 (Greece)	71–72	(France) Le Mans
Scoring by quarter: 18-17, 17-20, 15-8, 21-27
Pts: Richardson 19; Rebs: Richardson 8 Asts: Miles 7		Pts: Wright 15; Rebs: Salyers 7 Asts: Wright 4

Alexandrio Melathron
Attendance: 4,000
Referees: Ilija Belošević (SRB), Ademir Zurapović (SRB), Rüştü Nuran (TUR)

Game 3

9 February 2010
20:00

Report

ALBA Berlin (Germany)	61–65	(Greece) Aris BSA 2003
Scoring by quarter: 17-16, 14-19, 13-12, 17-18
Pts: Sekulić, Wright 15; Rebs: Sekulić 7 Asts: Wright 4		Pts: Clark 20; Rebs: Kakiouzis 8 Asts: Miles 3

O2 World
Attendance: 9,283
Referees: Luigi Lamonica (ITA), Oscar Lefwerth (SWE), Joseph Bissang (FRA)

9 February 2010
20:00

Report

Le Mans (France)	62–70	(Spain) DKV Joventut
Scoring by quarter: 16-11, 18-20, 19-17, 9-22
Pts: Spencer 17; Rebs: Wright 8 Asts: Diot 8		Pts: Bogdanovic 13; Rebs: Hernandez-Sonseca 9 Asts: Tucker 7

Antarès
Attendance: 4,600
Referees: Fabio Facchini (ITA), Andrej Lovsyn (SLO), Arnis Ozols (LAT)

Game 4

23 February 2010
20:00

Report

Aris BSA 2003 (Greece)	80–67	(Germany) ALBA Berlin
Scoring by quarter: 20-17, 16-21, 16-11, 28-18
Pts: Betts 19; Rebs: Kakiouzis 8 Asts: Clark 6		Pts: Golemac, Jenkins 11; Rebs: Byars 5 Asts: Golemac 5

Alexandrio Melathron
Attendance: 4,000
Referees: Saša Pukl (SLO), Fernand Rocha (POR), Boris Shulga (UKR)

23 February 2010
20:45

Report

DKV Joventut (Spain)	80–73	(France) Le Mans
Scoring by quarter: 21-23, 27-23, 8-7, 24-20
Pts: Tucker 17; Rebs: Koffi, Fernández 6 Asts: Tucker, Fernández 4		Pts: Spencer 22; Rebs: Batista 10; Asts: Wright, Spencer 3

Palau Municipal d'Esports de Badalona
Attendance: 3,067
Referees: Volodymr Drabikovsky (UKR), Robert Lottermoser (GER), Petri Mäntylä (FIN)

Game 5

2 March 2010
20:00

Report

Aris BSA 2003 (Greece)	84–54	(Spain) DKV Joventut
Scoring by quarter: 28-16, 19-16, 22-11, 15-11
Pts: Richardson 19; Rebs: Kakiouzis, Walsh 6 Asts: Miles 5		Pts: Bogdanovic 16; Rebs: Bogdanovic 8 Asts: Tucker 5

Alexandrio Melathron
Attendance: 4,500
Referees: Dubravko Muhvić (CRO), Matej Boltauzer (SLO), Damir Javor (SLO)

3 March 2010
20:00

Report

ALBA Berlin (Germany)	83–71	(France) Le Mans
Scoring by quarter: 22-14, 22-21, 17-17, 22-19
Pts: Sekulić 17; Rebs: Dojčin, McElroy 6 Asts: Wright, McElroy 5		Pts: Spencer 19; Rebs: Diot 6 Asts: five players with 2

O2 World
Attendance: 9,529
Referees: Marek Cmikiewicz (POL), Borys Ryzhyk (UKR), Sergey Mikhaylov (RUS)

Game 6

9 March 2010
20:30

Report

Le Mans (France)	79–75	(Greece) Aris BSA 2003
Scoring by quarter: 22–24, 15–13, 23–22, 19–16
Pts: Salyers 25; Rebs: Salyers 8 Asts: Diot 4		Pts: Clark 18; Rebs: Richardson 11; Asts: Miles 7

Antarès
Attendance: 3,100
Referees: Ilija Belošević (SRB), José Ramón García Ortiz (ESP), Robert Vyklicky (CZE)

9 March 2010
20:30

Report

DKV Joventut (Spain)	62–68	(Germany) ALBA Berlin
Scoring by quarter: 15–13, 11–7, 16–15, 20–33
Pts: Tripković 17; Rebs: Tripković 6 Asts: Valters 7		Pts: McElroy 14; Rebs: McElroy 6 Asts: Jenkins, Wright 5

Palau Municipal d'Esports de Badalona
Attendance: 5,980
Referees: Grzegorz Ziemblicki (POL), David Chambon (FRA), Olegs Latisevs (LAT)

== Group J ==
	Team	Pld	W	L	PF	PA	Diff
1.	(Spain) Power Elec Valencia	6	5	1	487	465	+22
2.	(Israel) Hapoel Jerusalem	6	4	2	507	480	+27
3.	(Russia) UNICS Kazan	6	3	3	477	484	–7
4.	(Turkey) Galatasaray Café Crown	6	0	6	526	568	–42

Game 1

26 January 2010
19:00

Report

Galatasaray Café Crown (Turkey)	79–85	(Russia) UNICS Kazan
Scoring by quarter: 13-21, 32-20, 19-25, 15-19
Pts: Jasaitis 21; Rebs: Rančík 13; Asts: Rančík 5		Pts: four players with 17; Rebs: Lampe 8 Asts: Popović 8

Abdi İpekçi Arena
Attendance: 1,500
Referees: Shmuel Bachar (ISR), Sergiy Chebyshev (UKR), Aleksandar Milojevik (MKD)

26 January 2010
20:30

Report

Power Elec Valencia (Spain)	75–79	(Israel) Hapoel Jerusalem
Scoring by quarter: 25-14, 15-21, 23-19, 12-25
Pts: de Colo 23; Rebs: Piétrus 5 Asts: de Colo 5		Pts: Simmons 17; Rebs: Simmons 6 Asts: Naimy 8

Pabellon Municipal Fuente San Luis
Attendance: 6,000
Referees: Costas Mouzakis (GRE), Gianpaolo Cicoria (ITA), Robert Lottermoser (GER)

Game 2

2 February 2010
17:00

Report

UNICS Kazan (Russia)	68–72	(Spain) Power Elec Valencia
Scoring by quarter: 15-24, 16-12, 19-22, 18-14
Pts: Lyday 17; Rebs: Lyday, Veremeenko 6 Asts: Popović 5		Pts: Martínez 22; Rebs: Claver, de Colo 8 Asts: de Colo 3

Basket-Hall Arena
Attendance: 2,700
Referees: Recep Ankaralı (TUR), Borys Ryzhyk (UKR), Miroslav Tomov (BUL)

2 February 2010
19:45

Report

Hapoel Jerusalem (Israel)	100–87	(Turkey) Galatasaray Café Crown
Scoring by quarter: 21-24, 30-17, 22-24, 27-22
Pts: Ohayon 18; Rebs: Lyons 8 Asts: Ohayon 8		Pts: Washington 29; Rebs: Wilkinson 8 Asts: Washington 5

Malha Arena
Attendance: 2,950
Referees: Christos Christodoulou (GRE), Andrej Lovsyn (SLO), Dragan Nesković (SRB)

Game 3

9 February 2010
17:00

Report

UNICS Kazan (Russia)	78–71	(Israel) Hapoel Jerusalem
Scoring by quarter: 19-21, 21-19, 19-13, 19-19
Pts: Popović 26; Rebs: Lampe 13; Asts: Lyday 5		Pts: Pinkney, Thompson 13; Rebs: Kokia, Thompson 8 Asts: Naimy 5

Basket-Hall Arena
Attendance: 2,800
Referees: Zoran Šutulović (MNE), Zdravko Rutešić (MNE), Oskars Lucis (LAT)

9 February 2010
19:00

Report

Galatasaray Café Crown (Turkey)	78–82	(Spain) Power Elec Valencia
Scoring by quarter: 10-26, 15-20, 22-13, 31-23
Pts: Büker 25; Rebs: Wilkinson, Jasaitis 8 Asts: Rančík 4		Pts: de Colo 17; Rebs: Nielsen 9 Asts: Nielsen 6

Abdi İpekçi Arena
Attendance: 1,000
Referees: Lazaros Voreadis (GRE), Seffi Shemmesh (ISR), Panagiotis Anastopoulos (GRE)

Game 4

23 February 2010
18:00

Report

Hapoel Jerusalem (Israel)	82–73	(Russia) UNICS Kazan
Scoring by quarter: 20-17, 21-15, 19-21, 22-20
Pts: Ohayon 19; Rebs: Thompson 9 Asts: Simmons 5		Pts: Lampe 30; Rebs: Lampe, Lyday 6 Asts: Popović, Zamanskiy 4

Malha Arena
Attendance: 2,300
Referees: Leonidas Spiridonos (GRE), Marko Juras (SRB), Radomir Vojinović (MNE)

23 February 2010
20:30

Report

Power Elec Valencia (Spain)	98–95 (OT)	(Turkey) Galatasaray Café Crown
Scoring by quarter: 26-20, 17-29, 21-17, 19-17, Overtime: 15-12
Pts: Martinez 24; Rebs: Nielsen 9 Asts: Claver, de Colo, Nielsen 4		Pts: Washington 26; Rebs: Rančík 11; Asts: Washington, Wilkinson 3

Pabellon Municipal Fuente San Luis
Attendance: 6,000
Referees: Sreten Radovic (CRO), Roman Kolar (SLO), Renaud Geller (BEL)

Game 5

2 March 2010
17:00

Report

UNICS Kazan (Russia)	92–89	(Turkey) Galatasaray Café Crown
Scoring by quarter: 23-20, 23-21, 20-28, 26-20
Pts: Popović 22; Rebs: Lampe 10; Asts: Popović 5		Pts: Washington 32; Rebs: four players with 5 Asts: Washington 7

Basket-Hall Arena
Attendance: 3,000
Referees: Boris Shulga (UKR), Petri Mäntylä (FIN), Omer Esteron (ISR)

2 March 2010
18:00

Report

Hapoel Jerusalem (Israel)	64–69	(Spain) Power Elec Valencia
Scoring by quarter: 21-20, 12-23, 20-11, 11-15
Pts: Pinkney 15; Rebs: Pinkney, Simmons, Thompson 6 Asts: Naimy 5		Pts: Kelati 17; Rebs: Claver, Nielsen 7 Asts: Kelati 4

Malha Arena
Attendance: 2,300
Referees: Costas Mouzakis (GRE), Murat Biricik (TUR), Carmelo Paternico (ITA)

Game 6

9 March 2010
20:30

Report

Galatasaray Café Crown (Turkey)	98–111	(Israel) Hapoel Jerusalem
Scoring by quarter: 22–32, 29–19, 23–16, 24–44
Pts: Wilkinson 27; Rebs: 4 players with 4 Asts: Büker 8 Blocks: Solak 5		Pts: Naimy 27; Rebs: Hunter, Kokia 5 Asts: Naimy 7

Abdi İpekçi Arena
Attendance: 250
Referees: Volodymr Drabikovsky (UKR), Siniša Herceg (CRO), Saša Maričić (SRB)

9 March 2010
20:30

Report

Power Elec Valencia (Spain)	91–81	(Russia) UNICS Kazan
Scoring by quarter: 24–19, 22–15, 27–21, 18–26
Pts: Lishchuk 18; Rebs: Perović 6 Asts: de Colo, Nielsen 4		Pts: Lampe 20; Rebs: Lampe 11; Asts: Popović 4

Pabellon Municipal Fuente San Luis
Attendance: 8,500
Referees: Fabio Facchini (ITA), Marek Cmikiewicz (POL), Tolga Sahin (TUR)

== Group K ==
	Team	Pld	W	L	PF	PA	Diff	Tie-break
1.	(Spain) Bizkaia Bilbao Basket	6	4	2	447	400	+47	1–1 +13
2.	(Greece) Panellinios BC	6	4	2	462	457	+5	1–1 –13
3.	(Italy) Benetton Basket	6	2	4	450	460	–10	1–1 +6
4.	(Germany) Brose Baskets	6	2	4	410	452	–42	1–1 –6

Game 1

26 January 2010
20:00

Report

Panellinios BC (Greece)	70–62	(Germany) Brose Baskets
Scoring by quarter: 21-15, 18-10, 11-12, 20-25
Pts: Smith 14; Rebs: Davis 11; Asts: Blakney 5		Pts: Roberts 18; Rebs: Brown 11; Asts: Šuput 2

Helliniko Olympic Arena
Attendance: 300
Referees: Milivoje Jovčić (SRB), Vicente Bulto (ESP), Marko Juras (SRB)

26 January 2010
20:45

Report

Benetton Basket (Italy)	69–76	(Spain) Bizkaia Bilbao Basket
Scoring by quarter: 20-14, 15-28, 16-12, 18-22
Pts: Neal 18; Rebs: Hukić, Nicević, Motiejūnas 5 Asts: Wallace 4		Pts: Blūms 22; Rebs: Banić 7 Asts: Salgado 3

Palaverde
Attendance: 2,548
Referees: Dubravko Muhvić (CRO), Marek Ćmikiewicz (POL), Oliver Krause (GER)

Game 2

2 February 2010
20:00

Report

Brose Baskets (Germany)	73–63	(Italy) Benetton Basket
Scoring by quarter: 21-11, 10-20, 18-18, 24-14
Pts: Šuput 22; Rebs: Pleiß 10; Asts: Goldsberry, Gavel 4		Pts: Neal 13; Rebs: Rivers 5 Asts: Kus 5

Jako Arena
Attendance: 6,432
Referees: Juan Carlos García González (ESP), Antonio Conde (ESP), Marius Ciulin (ROU)

2 February 2010
20:15

Report

Bizkaia Bilbao Basket (Spain)	81–61	(Greece) Panellinios BC
Scoring by quarter: 19-16, 22-16, 19-17, 21-12
Pts: Blūms 17; Rebs: Hervelle 7 Asts: Salgado 4		Pts: Vougioukas 20; Rebs: Vougioukas 6 Asts: Xanthopoulos, Charalampidis, Vougioukas 2

Bizkaia Arena
Attendance: 6,832
Referees: Fabio Facchini (ITA), Nicolas Maestre (FRA), Jurgis Laurinavičius (LTU)

Game 3

9 February 2010
20:00

Report

Panellinios BC (Greece)	88–79	(Italy) Benetton Basket
Scoring by quarter: 23-22, 24-18, 13-17, 28-22
Pts: Charalampidis, Papamakarios 19; Rebs: Davis 5 Asts: Xanthopoulos 5		Pts: Neal 15; Rebs: Motiejūnas 9 Asts: Neal 3

Indoor Hall Peristeriou
Attendance: 320
Referees: Juan Carlos Mitjana (ESP), Dragan Neskovic (SRB), Ademir Zurapovic (SRB)

9 February 2010
20:00

Report

Brose Baskets (Germany)	55–76	(Spain) Bizkaia Bilbao Basket
Scoring by quarter: 21-16, 6-21, 10-15, 18-24
Pts: Brown 22; Rebs: Brown 10; Asts: Goldsberry 4		Pts: Banić 18; Rebs: Moïso 8 Asts: Salgado 7

Jako Arena
Attendance: 6,800
Referees: Carl Jungebrand (FIN), Robert Vyklicky (CZE), Yaron Zarif (ISR)

Game 4

23 February 2010
20:15

Report

Bizkaia Bilbao Basket (Spain)	76–66	(Germany) Brose Baskets
Scoring by quarter: 21-18, 17-17, 14-13, 24-18
Pts: Moïso 14; Rebs: Moïso, Markota, Banić 4 Asts: Salgado 5		Pts: Roberts 18; Rebs: Brown 9 Asts: Jacobsen 2

Bizkaia Arena
Attendance: 4,968
Referees: Andrej Lovsyn (SLO), Sergiy Zashchuck (UKR), Rüştü Nuran (TUR)

23 February 2010
20:45

Report

Benetton Basket (Italy)	81–85	(Greece) Panellinios BC
Scoring by quarter: 20-22, 18-21, 20-18, 23-24
Pts: Neal 25; Rebs: Wallace 6 Asts: Rivers, Neal 3		Pts: Charalampidis 26; Rebs: Vougioukas 7 Asts: Smith 3

Palaverde
Attendance: 2,213
Referees: Shmuel Bachar (ISR), Murat Biricik (TUR), Damir Javor (SLO)

Game 5

2 March 2010
20:00

Report

Brose Baskets (Germany)	84–81	(Greece) Panellinios BC
Scoring by quarter: 17-12, 16-26, 18-18, 33-25
Pts: Jacobsen 25; Rebs: Šuput 8 Asts: four players with 2		Pts: Blakney 18; Rebs: Charalampidis 6 Asts: Kalaitzis 6

Jako Arena
Attendance: 6,800
Referees: Sreten Radovic (CRO), Tomas Jasevicius (LTU), Oscar Lefwert (SWE)

2 March 2010
20:15

Report

Bizkaia Bilbao Basket (Spain)	68–72	(Italy) Benetton Basket
Scoring by quarter: 15-18, 19-15, 19-20, 15-19
Pts: Banić 14; Rebs: Banić, Hervelle 4 Asts: Rodríguez, Mumbrú 4		Pts: Nicević 14; Rebs: Nicević, Motiejūnas 5 Asts: Kus 4

Bizkaia Arena
Attendance: 6,659
Referees: Luis Lopes (POR), Arnis Ozols (LAT), Apostolos Kalpakas (SWE)

Game 6

9 March 2010
20:00

Report

Benetton Basket (Italy)	86–70	(Germany) Brose Baskets
Scoring by quarter: 20-20, 24-20, 25-11, 17-19
Pts: Nicević 22; Rebs: Nicević 10; Asts: De Nicolao, Neal 4		Pts: Pleiß, Worthington 18; Rebs: Pleiß 12; Asts: Goldsberry 3

Palaverde
Attendance: 1,948
Referees: Vicente Bulto (ESP), Antonio Conde (ESP), Joseph Bissang (FRA)

9 March 2010
20:00

Report

Panellinios BC (Greece)	77–70	(Spain) Bizkaia Bilbao Basket
Scoring by quarter: 19-21, 22-19, 19-16, 17-14
Pts: Smith 18; Rebs: Smith 5 Asts: Charalampidis 4		Pts: Salgado 12; Rebs: Blūms 7 Asts: Salgado 6

Helliniko Olympic Arena
Attendance: 342
Referees: Zoran Šutulović (MNE), Andrej Jeršan (SLO), Marko Juras (SRB)

== Group L ==
	Team	Pld	W	L	PF	PA	Diff	Tie-break
1.	(Spain) Gran Canaria 2014	6	4	2	440	431	+9	
2.	(Czech Republic) ČEZ Nymburk	6	3	3	447	446	+1	1–1 +13
3.	(Serbia) Crvena zvezda	6	3	3	440	426	+14	1–1 –13
4.	(Turkey) Türk Telekom	6	2	4	474	498	–24	

Game 1

26 January 2010
18:00

Report

ČEZ Nymburk (Czech Republic)	60–65	(Serbia) Crvena zvezda
Scoring by quarter: 19-19, 22-17, 8-16, 11-13
Pts: Benda 14; Rebs: Lewis 10; Asts: Benda 3		Pts: Taylor 19; Rebs: Štimac 7 Asts: Videnov, Bjelica 3

ČEZ Arena
Attendance: 6,328
Referees: Volodymr Drabikovsky(UKR), Boris Shulga (UKR), Apostolos Kalpakas (SWE)

26 January 2010
21:30

Report

Gran Canaria 2014 (Spain)	73–65	(Turkey) Türk Telekom
Scoring by quarter: 18-19, 18-12, 20-18, 17-16
Pts: Savané 15; Rebs: five players with 4 Asts: Norris 6		Pts: Mallet 19; Rebs: Lang 12; Asts: Mallet 4

Centro Insular de Deportes
Attendance: 3,780
Referees: Fernando Rocha (POR), Carmelo Paternico (ITA), Christophe Vauthier (FRA)

Game 2

2 February 2010
18:15

Report

Türk Telekom (Turkey)	92–97 (OT)	(Czech Republic) ČEZ Nymburk
Scoring by quarter: 23-21, 22-25, 16-22, 26-19, Overtime: 5-10
Pts: Dudley 18; Rebs: Dudley 7 Asts: Açık 11		Pts: Ricci 24; Rebs: Ricci 8 Asts: Lewis 5

Ankara Atatürk Sport Hall
Attendance: 2,155
Referees: Saša Pukl (SLO), Petar Obradovic(BIH), Oskars Lucis (LAT)

2 February 2010
18:45

Report

Crvena zvezda (Serbia)	97–67	(Spain) Gran Canaria 2014
Scoring by quarter: 22-15, 31-22, 19-22, 25-8
Pts: Bjelica 22; Rebs: Stević, Bjelica 6 Asts: Taylor, Bakić 4		Pts: Sanders 17; Rebs: Augustine 4 Asts: Norris, Carroll 3

Pionir Hall
Attendance: 5,200
Referees: Lazaros Voreadis (GRE), Murat Biricik (TUR), Omer Esteron (ISR)

Game 3

9 February 2010
18:15

Report

Türk Telekom (Turkey)	67–89	(Serbia) Crvena zvezda
Scoring by quarter: 17-14, 13-26, 21-27, 16-22
Pts: Erdoğan 19; Rebs: Wilson 5 Asts: Erdoğan 3		Pts: Stević, Videnov, Bjelica 15; Rebs: Štimac, Bjelica 6 Asts: Bjelica 6

Ankara Atatürk Sport Hall
Attendance: 2,035
Referees: Andrej Jersan (SLO), Sergey Mikhaylov (RUS), Antonio Conde (ESP)

9 February 2010
21:30

Report

Gran Canaria 2014 (Spain)	69–54	(Czech Republic) ČEZ Nymburk
Scoring by quarter: 20-18, 22-7, 14-17, 13-12
Pts: Carroll 22; Rebs: Augustine 10; Asts: Norris 5		Pts: Lenzly 15; Rebs: Lewis 7 Asts: Lee 3

Centro Insular de Deportes
Attendance: 4,119
Referees: Spiros Gkontas (GRE), Marcin Kowalski (POL), Aleksandar Milojevik (MKD)

Game 4

23 February 2010
18:00

Report

ČEZ Nymburk (Czech Republic)	79–71 (OT)	(Spain) Gran Canaria 2014
Scoring by quarter: 17-24, 24-10, 14-21, 14-14, Overtime: 10-2
Pts: Lee 19; Rebs: Benda 6 Asts: Lee 3		Pts: Carroll 21; Rebs: Savané 8 Asts: Bellas 5

ČEZ Aréna
Attendance: 7,280
Referees: Dubravko Muhvic (CRO), Sasa Maricic (SRB), Lahdo Sharro (SWE)

23 February 2010
18:00

Report

Crvena zvezda (Serbia)	76–78	(Turkey) Türk Telekom
Scoring by quarter: 13-26, 29-8, 22-20, 12-24
Pts: Stević 18; Rebs: Stević 8 Asts: Taylor, Bjelica 4		Pts: Mallet 25; Rebs: Wilson 8 Asts: Mallet 4

Hala Pionir
Attendance: 3,000
Referees: Carl Jungebrand (FIN), Robert Vyklicky (CZE), Jurgis Lauravicius (LTU)

Game 5

2 March 2010
18:15

Report

Türk Telekom (Turkey)	78–79	(Spain) Gran Canaria 2014
Scoring by quarter: 21-26, 18-26, 22-12, 17-15
Pts: Wilson 25; Rebs: Beşok 10; Asts: Senturk 7		Pts: Carroll 22; Rebs: Augustine 12; Asts: Savané, Norris 4

Ankara Atatürk Sport Hall
Attendance: 1,482
Referees: Gianpaolo Cicoria (ITA), Sradan Dozai (CRO), Sinisa Herceg (CRO)

2 March 2010
20:00

Report

Crvena zvezda (Serbia)	55–73	(Czech Republic) ČEZ Nymburk
Scoring by quarter: 15-15, 18-20, 10-21, 12-17
Pts: Videnov 10; Rebs: Stević 9 Asts: four players with 1		Pts: Benda 18; Rebs: Benda 7 Asts: Lee 6

Hala Pionir
Attendance: 3,500
Referees: Fabio Facchini (ITA), Marius Ciulin (ROU), Panagiotis Anastopoulos (GRE)

Game 6

9 March 2010
20:00

Report

Gran Canaria 2014 (Spain)	81–58	(Serbia) Crvena zvezda
Scoring by quarter: 18-15, 26-14, 20-13, 17-16
Pts: McDonald 24; Rebs: McDonald 7 Asts: Bellas, Carroll 3		Pts: Stević 12; Rebs: Stević 8 Asts: Stević 3

Centro Insular de Deportes
Attendance: 5,125
Referees: Lazaros Voreadis (GRE), Nicola Maestre (FRA), Gianluca Mattioli (ITA)

9 March 2010
20:00

Report

ČEZ Nymburk (Czech Republic)	84–94	(Turkey) Türk Telekom
Scoring by quarter: 24-18, 19-23, 21-30, 20-23
Pts: Lee 22; Rebs: Benda 7 Asts: Necas, Lee 5		Pts: Yarangüme 22; Rebs: Wilson 6 Asts: Wilson, Açık, Sentürk 4

ČEZ Aréna
Attendance: 8,214
Referees: Leonidas Spiridonos (GRE), Tomas Jasevicius (LTU), Luis Lopes (POR)
