= Kent State Golden Flashes men's basketball statistical leaders =

The Kent State Golden Flashes men's basketball statistical leaders are individual statistical leaders of the Kent State Golden Flashes men's basketball program in various categories, including points, rebounds, assists, steals, and blocks. Within those areas, the lists identify single-game, single-season, and career leaders. The Golden Flashes represent Kent State University in the NCAA's Mid-American Conference.

Kent State began competing in intercollegiate basketball in 1913. However, the school's record book does not generally list records from before the 1950s, as records from before this period are often incomplete and inconsistent. Since scoring was much lower in this era, and teams played much fewer games during a typical season, it is likely that few or no players from this era would appear on these lists anyway.

The NCAA did not officially record assists as a stat until the 1983–84 season, and blocks and steals until the 1985–86 season, but Kent State's record books includes players in these stats before these seasons. These lists are updated through the end of the 2020–21 season.

== Scoring ==
Career
Rank	Player	Points	Seasons
1	Trevor Huffman	1,820	1998–99 1999–00 2000–01 2001–02
2	Jaylin Walker	1,804	2015–16 2016–17 2017–18 2018–19
3	Burrell McGhee	1,710	1976–77 1977–78 1978–79
4	Jimmy Hall	1,683	2014–15 2015–16 2016–17
5	Anthony Grier	1,565	1981–82 1982–83 1983–84 1984–85
6	Justin Greene	1,550	2008–09 2009–10 2010–11 2011–12
7	Eric Glenn	1,536	1986–87 1987–88 1988–89 1989–90
8	Andrew Mitchell	1,533	1998–99 1999–00 2000–01 2001–02
9	Larry Robbins	1,520	1981–82 1982–83 1983–84 1984–85
10	Jalen Sullinger	1,486	2021–22 2022–23 2023–24 2024–25

Season
Rank	Player	Points	Season
1	Jimmy Hall	683	2016–17
2	Antonio Gates	640	2002–03
3	Anthony Grier	629	1984–85
4	Burrell McGhee	617	1977–78
5	Sincere Carry	613	2022–23
6	Sincere Carry	609	2021–22
7	Delrecco Gillespie	602	2025–26
8	Larry Robbins	594	1984–85
9	Jaylin Walker	582	2018–19
10	Trevor Huffman	577	2001–02

Single game
Rank	Player	Points	Season	Opponent
1	Dan Potopsky	49	1954–55	Western Michigan
2	Dan Potopsky	48	1955–56	Marshall
	Dan Potopsky	48	1954–55	Marshall
4	Sincere Carry	42	2021–22	Ball State
5	Doug Grayson	41	1966–67	North Carolina
6	Dan Potopsky	39	1953–54	Akron

== Rebounds ==
Career
Rank	Player	Rebounds	Seasons
1	Trent Grooms	1,012	1976–77 1977–78 1978–79 1979–80
2	Jimmy Hall	867	2014–15 2015–16 2016–17
3	Justin Greene	814	2008–09 2009–10 2010–11 2011–12
4	Bradley Robinson	768	1973–74 1974–75 1975–76
5	Terry Wearsch	762	1983–84 1984–85 1985–86 1986–87
6	Delrecco Gillespie	741	2022–23 2023–24 2024–25 2025–26
7	Danny Pippen	693	2016–17 2017–18 2019–20 2020–21
8	Roger Evans	669	1969–70 1970–71 1971–72
9	Mike Scott	646	2004–05 2005–06 2006–07 2007–08
10	Eric Glenn	628	1986–87 1987–88 1988–89 1989–90

Season
Rank	Player	Rebounds	Season
1	Bradley Robinson	423	1973–74
2	Jimmy Hall	383	2016–17
	Delrecco Gillespie	383	2025–26
4	Jim Nowakowaski	324	1951–52
5	Trent Grooms	319	1979–80
6	Justin Greene	308	2010–11
7	Antonio Gates	291	2001–02
	Trent Grooms	291	1978–79
9	Dwight Kenner	289	1971–72
10	Harvey Hunt	283	1960–61

Single game
Rank	Player	Rebounds	Season	Opponent
1	Leroy Thompson	31	1948–49	Case Western
	Fred Klaisner	31	1947–48	Western Reserve
3	Bradley Robinson	30	1973–74	Central Michigan

== Assists ==
Career
Rank	Player	Assists	Seasons
1	DeAndre Haynes	625	2002–03 2003–04 2004–05 2005–06
2	Ed Norvell	594	1995–96 1996–97 1997–98 1998–99
3	Trevor Huffman	520	1998–99 1999–00 2000–01 2001–02
4	Anthony Grier	503	1981–82 1982–83 1983–84 1984–85
5	Andrew Mitchell	413	1998–99 1999–00 2000–01 2001–02
6	Reggie Adams	391	1985–86 1986–87 1987–88 1988–89
7	Giovanni Santiago	381	2019–20 2020–21 2021–22 2022–23 2023–24
8	Cian Medley	353	2024–25 2025–26
9	Jordan Mincy	347	2005–06 2006–07 2007–08 2008–09
10	Harold Walton	342	1988–89 1989–90 1990–91 1991–92

Season
Rank	Player	Assists	Season
1	Cian Medley	212	2025–26
2	DeAndre Haynes	180	2004–05
3	DeAndre Haynes	179	2003–04
4	Ed Norvell	174	1996–97
5	Sincere Carry	167	2022–23
6	Sincere Carry	162	2021–22
7	Ed Norvell	161	1997–98
8	Michael Porrini	160	2010–11
9	Trevor Huffman	157	2001–02
10	Anthony Grier	156	1982–83

Single game
Rank	Player	Assists	Season	Opponent
1	Cian Medley	16	2025–26	Penn State-Shenango
2	Joe McKeown	15	1977–78	Bowling Green
3	Reggie Adams	13	1986–87	Slippery Rock
	Anthony Grier	13	1982–83	Northern Illinois

== Steals ==
Career
Rank	Player	Steals	Seasons
1	DeAndre Haynes	229	2002–03 2003–04 2004–05 2005–06
2	Reggie Adams	197	1985–86 1986–87 1987–88 1988–89
3	Chris Singletary	191	2006–07 2007–08 2008–09 2009–10
4	Malique Jacobs	185	2020–21 2021–22 2022–23
5	Ed Norvell	184	1995–96 1996–97 1997–98 1998–99
6	Harold Walton	177	1988–89 1989–90 1990–91 1991–92
7	Rodriquez Sherman	165	2006–07 2007–08 2009–10 2010–11
8	Andrew Mitchell	164	1998–99 1999–00 2000–01 2001–02
9	Anthony Grier	160	1981–82 1982–83 1983–84 1984–85
10	Trevor Huffman	156	1998–99 1999–00 2000–01 2001–02

Season
Rank	Player	Steals	Season
1	Malique Jacobs	90	2022–23
2	Reggie Adams	76	1986–87
3	DeAndre Haynes	72	2003–04
4	Chris Evans	67	2012–13
	Robert Kitchen	67	1979–80
6	Michael Porrini	65	2010–11
7	Reggie Adams	64	1987–88
8	Haminn Quaintance	63	2007–08
9	Harold Walton	62	1989–90
10	Larry Robbins	61	1984–85

Single game
Rank	Player	Steals	Season	Opponent
1	Malique Jacobs	10	2022–23	Chicago State
2	Chris Singletary	8	2008–09	UNC Greensboro
	Mike Klinzing	8	1990–91	Bowling Green
4	Malique Jacobs	7	2022–23	Bowling Green
	Kyrem Massey	7	1997–98	Loyola [Md.]
	Bill Toole	7	1986–87	Central Michigan

== Blocks ==
Career
Rank	Player	Blocks	Seasons
1	John Edwards	179	2000–01 2001–02 2002–03 2003–04
2	Khaliq Spicer	167	2012–13 2013–14 2014–15 2015–16
3	Danny Pippen	145	2016–17 2017–18 2019–20 2020–21
4	Justin Greene	120	2008–09 2009–10 2010–11 2011–12
5	Haminn Quaintance	117	2006–07 2007–08
6	John Whorton	107	1996–97 1997–98 1998–99 1999–00
7	Cli'Ron Hornbeak	105	2021–22 2022–23 2023–24 2024–25
8	Terry Wearsch	98	1983–84 1984–85 1985–86 1986–87
9	Jimmy Hall	95	2014–15 2015–16 2016–17
10	Kyrem Massey	92	1997–98 1998–99 1999–00 2000–01

Season
Rank	Player	Blocks	Season
1	John Edwards	81	2003–04
2	Haminn Quaintance	69	2007–08
3	Khaliq Spicer	56	2015–16
4	Danny Pippen	54	2017–18
5	Justin Greene	53	2010–11
	Khaliq Spicer	53	2014–15
7	Haminn Quaintance	48	2006–07
	Jimmy Hall	48	2016–17
9	Danny Pippen	47	2019–20
10	Khaliq Spicer	45	2013–14

Single game
Rank	Player	Blocks	Season	Opponent
1	Khaliq Spicer	7	2015–16	Ball State
	Danny Pippen	7	2017–18	Bowling Green
	Danny Pippen	7	2019–20	Detroit Mercy
	Cli'Ron Hornbeak	7	2024–25	Eastern Michigan
5	John Edwards	6	2003–04	Buffalo
	John Edwards	6	2002–03	Buffalo
	Tony Banks	6	1989–90	Wright State
	Danny Pippen	6	2016–17	Hiram
