= Eurocup Basketball 2009–10 quarterfinals =

Results of the quarterfinals of the Eurocup Basketball 2009–10 basketball tournament.

The quarterfinals were two-legged ties determined on aggregate score. The first leg of the Bilbao–Nymburk tie was held on March 23, with the first leg of all other ties held on March 24. The return leg of all ties were played on March 31. The group winner in each tie, listed as "Team #1", hosted the second leg.

Team #1	Agg.	Team #2	1st leg	2nd leg
ALBA Berlin (Germany)	133 – 126	(Israel) Hapoel Jerusalem	61 – 67	72 – 59
Power Elec Valencia (Spain)	156 – 131	(Greece) Aris BSA 2003	71 – 64	85 – 67
Bizkaia Bilbao Basket (Spain)	105 – 99	(Czech Republic) ČEZ Nymburk	59 – 47	46 – 52
Gran Canaria 2014 (Spain)	145 – 149	(Greece) Panellinios BC	70 – 81	75 – 68

All times given below for the first leg are in Central European Time, and for the second leg in Central European Summer Time.

== Quarterfinal 1 ==
Game 1

24 March 2010
18:30

Report

Hapoel Jerusalem (Israel)	67–61	(Germany) ALBA Berlin
Scoring by quarter: 16-11, 14-7, 19-23, 18-20
Pts: Hunter 23; Rebs: Hunter 10; Asts: Thompson 5		Pts: Byars 17; Rebs: Chubb 7 Asts: Dojčin, Wright 3

Malha Arena
Attendance: 2,300
Referees: José Martín (ESP), Leonidas Spiridonos (GRE), Milija Vojinovic (SRB)

Game 2

31 March 2010
19:45

Report

ALBA Berlin (Germany)	72–59	(Israel) Hapoel Jerusalem
Scoring by quarter: 20-7, 16-21, 16-9, 20-22
Pts: Byars 16; Rebs: Byars, McElroy 4 Asts: McElroy 6		Pts: Jeter 19; Rebs: Hunter 7 Asts: Naimy, Jeter 4

O2 World
Attendance: 14,500
Referees: Jose Ramon Garcia Ortiz (ESP), Juan Carlos García González (ESP), Sergey Mikhaylov (RUS)

== Quarterfinal 2 ==
Game 1

24 March 2010
17:30

Report

Aris BSA 2003 (Greece)	64–71	(Spain) Power Elec Valencia
Scoring by quarter: 13-21, 21-16, 14-16, 16-18
Pts: Clark 14; Rebs: Walsh 9 Asts: Miles 3		Pts: Marinović 18; Rebs: Claver, Lishouk, Piétrus 4 Asts: de Colo 3

Alexandrio Melathron
Attendance: 5,200
Referees: Guerrino Cerebuch (ITA), Milivoje Jovčić (SRB), Matej Boltauzer (SLO)

Game 2

31 March 2010
21:15

Report

Power Elec Valencia (Spain)	85–67	(Greece) Aris BSA 2003
Scoring by quarter: 22-14, 25-14, 17-20, 21-19
Pts: Kelati 18; Rebs: Nielsen 6 Asts: Simeon 5		Pts: Walsh 15; Rebs: Walsh 7 Asts: Miles 4

Pabellon Municipal Fuente San Luis
Attendance: 9,000
Referees: Romualdas Brazauskas (LTU), Fernando Rocha (POR), Nicolas Maestre (FRA)

== Quarterfinal 3 ==
Game 1

23 March 2010
20:15

Report

ČEZ Nymburk (Czech Republic)	47–59	(Spain) Bizkaia Bilbao Basket
Scoring by quarter: 18-15, 14-7, 10-13, 5-24
Pts: Lewis 17; Rebs: Benda 7 Asts: Benda, Lewis 3		Pts: Moïso 11; Rebs: Hervelle 10; Asts: Rodríguez 4

ČEZ Aréna
Attendance: 7,520
Referees: Costas Mouzakis (GRE), Marek Ćmikiewicz (POL), Sinisa Herceg (CRO)

Game 2

31 March 2010
20:15

Report

Bizkaia Bilbao Basket (Spain)	46–52	(Czech Republic) ČEZ Nymburk
Scoring by quarter: 13-12, 5-14, 17-10, 11-16
Pts: Banić 12; Rebs: Hervelle 8 Asts: Rodríguez, Mumbrú, Hervelle 2		Pts: Lee 12; Rebs: Benda 8 Asts: Lee 4

Bizkaia Arena
Attendance: 5,782
Referees: Saša Pukl (SLO), Sasa Maricic (SRB), Damir Javor (SLO)

== Quarterfinal 4 ==
Game 1

24 March 2010
17:30

Report

Panellinios BC (Greece)	81–70	(Spain) Gran Canaria 2014
Scoring by quarter: 20-16, 19-24, 21-11, 21-19
Pts: Blakney 21; Rebs: Vougioukas 8 Asts: Papamakarios 5		Pts: Carroll 22; Rebs: Augustine 9 Asts: Norris 3

Helliniko Olympic Arena
Attendance: 650
Referees: Fabio Facchini (ITA), Paolo Taurino (ITA), Tomas Jasevicius (LTU)

Game 2

31 March 2010
20:30

Report

Gran Canaria 2014 (Spain)	75–68	(Greece) Panellinios BC
Scoring by quarter: 20-12, 19-20, 15-13, 21-23
Pts: Carroll 17; Rebs: Savané 6 Asts: Norris, Carroll 3		Pts: Blakney 15; Rebs: Owens 11; Asts: Kalaitzis 2

Centro Insular de Deportes
Attendance: 5,127
Referees: Dubravko Muhvic (CRO), Luis Lopes (POR), Robert Vyklicky (CZE)
