= Naimy =

Naimy is a name. People with the name include:

- Mikhail Naimy (1889–1988) Lebanese writer and philosopher
- Yuval Naimy (born 1985) Israeli basketball player
- Naimy Hackett
