= 2000–01 Mid-American Conference men's basketball season =

- League: NCAA Division I
- Sport: Basketball
- Teams: 13

Regular season
- League champions: Central Michigan
- Runners-up: Kent State
- Season MVP: David Webber

Tournament
- Champions: Kent State
- Runners-up: Miami
- Finals MVP: Trevor Huffman

Mid-American men's basketball seasons
- ← 1999–2000 2001–02 →

2000–01 Mid-American Conference men's basketball standings
	Conf.				Overall
Team	W		L	PCT	W		L	PCT
East
Kent State †	13	–	5	.722	24	–	10	.706
Marshall	12	–	6	.667	18	–	9	.667
Ohio	12	–	6	.667	19	–	11	.633
Bowling Green	10	–	8	.556	15	–	14	.517
Miami (OH)	10	–	8	.556	17	–	16	.515
Akron	9	–	9	.500	12	–	16	.429
Buffalo	2	–	16	.111	4	–	24	.143
West
Central Michigan	14	–	4	.778	20	–	8	.714
Toledo	12	–	6	.667	22	–	11	.667
Ball State	11	–	7	.611	18	–	12	.600
Western Michigan	7	–	11	.389	7	–	21	.250
Northern Illinois	4	–	14	.222	5	–	23	.179
Eastern Michigan	1	–	17	.056	3	–	25	.107
† 2001 MAC tournament winner Rankings from AP Poll

The 2000–01 Mid-American Conference men's basketball season began with practices in October 2000, followed by the start of the 2000–01 NCAA Division I men's basketball season in November. Conference play began in January 2001 and concluded in March 2001. Central Michigan won the regular season title with a conference record of 14–4 by one game over second-place Kent State. Kent State defeated Miami in the MAC tournament final and represented the MAC in the NCAA tournament. There they defeated Indiana before losing to Cincinnati.

== Preseason awards ==
The preseason poll was announced by the league office on October 4, 2000.

=== Preseason men's basketball poll ===
(First place votes in parentheses)

==== East Division ====
1. Marshall (29) 265
2. Kent State (11) 229
3. Bowling Green 174
4. Miami 165
5. Ohio 144
6. Akron 100
7. Buffalo 43

==== West Division ====
1. Ball State (20) 219
2. Toledo (19) 213
3. Central Michigan (1) 133
4. Eastern Michigan 122
5. Northern Illinois 79
6. Western Michigan 74

==== Tournament champs ====
Marshall (14), Ball State (10), Kent State (7), Toledo (6), Bowling Green (1), Miami (1), Central Michigan (1)

=== Honors ===
Honor	Recipient
Preseason All-MAC First Team	Greg Stempin, Toledo
Preseason All-MAC First Team	Tamar Slay, Marshall
Preseason All-MAC First Team	J.R. VanHoose, Marshall
Preseason All-MAC First Team	Theron Smith, Ball State
Preseason All-MAC First Team	David Webber, Central Michigan

== Postseason ==
=== Postseason awards ===
1. Coach of the Year: Jay Smith, Central Michigan
2. Player of the Year: David Webber, Central Michigan
3. Freshman of the Year: Terry Reynolds, Toledo
4. Defensive Player of the Year: Demetric Shaw, Kent State

=== Honors ===
Honor	Recipient
Postseason All-MAC First Team	David Webber, Central Michigan
Postseason All-MAC First Team	Trevor Huffman, Kent State
Postseason All-MAC First Team	J.R. Van Hoose, Marshall
Postseason All-MAC First Team	Brandon Hunter, Ohio
Postseason All-MAC First Team	Greg Stempin, Toledo
Postseason All-MAC Second Team	Theron Smith, Ball State
Postseason All-MAC Second Team	Keith McLeod, Bowling Green
Postseason All-MAC Second Team	Kyrem Massey, Kent State
Postseason All-MAC Second Team	Tamar Slay, Marshall
Postseason All-MAC Second Team	Alex Shorts, Miami
Postseason All-MAC Honorable Mention	Nate Schindewolf, Aron
Postseason All-MAC Honorable Mention	Len Matela, Bowling Green
Postseason All-MAC Honorable Mention	Chad Pleiness, Central Michigan
Postseason All-MAC Honorable Mention	Andrew Mitchell, Kent State
Postseason All-MAC Honorable Mention	Demetric Shaw, Kent State
Postseason All-MAC Honorable Mention	Travis Young, Marshall
Postseason All-MAC Honorable Mention	Jason Grunkemeyer, Miami
Postseason All-MAC Honorable Mention	Leon Rodgers, Northern Illinois
Postseason All-MAC Honorable Mention	Patrick Flomo, Ohio
Postseason All-MAC Honorable Mention	Jon Powell, Western Michigan
All-MAC Freshman Team	Josh Almanson, Bowling Green
All-MAC Freshman Team	Gerrit Brigitha, Central Michigan
All-MAC Freshman Team	Chris Kaman, Central Michigan
All-MAC Freshman Team	Juby Johnson, Miami
All-MAC Freshman Team	Terry Reynolds, Toledo
