= 1998–99 Miami RedHawks men's basketball team =

American college basketball season

1998–99 Miami RedHawks men's basketball

MAC Regular season champion MAC East champion

NCAA tournament, Sweet Sixteen
- Conference: Mid-American Conference
- East

Ranking
- Coaches: No. 20
- Record: 24–8 (15–3 MAC)
- Head coach: Charlie Coles (3rd season)
- Home arena: Millett Hall

1998–99 Mid-American Conference men's basketball standings
	Conf.				Overall
Team	W		L	PCT	W		L	PCT
East
Miami	15	–	3	.833	24	–	8	.750
Kent State †	13	–	5	.722	23	–	7	.767
Akron	12	–	6	.667	18	–	9	.667
Ohio	12	–	6	.667	18	–	10	.643
Bowling Green	12	–	6	.667	18	–	10	.643
Marshall	11	–	7	.611	16	–	11	.593
Buffalo	1	–	17	.056	5	–	24	.172
West
Toledo	11	–	7	.611	19	–	9	.679
Ball State	10	–	8	.556	16	–	11	.593
Central Michigan	7	–	11	.389	10	–	16	.385
Western Michigan	6	–	12	.333	11	–	15	.423
Eastern Michigan	5	–	13	.278	5	–	20	.200
Northern Illinois	2	–	16	.111	6	–	20	.231
† 1999 MAC tournament winner Rankings from AP Poll

The 1998–99 Miami RedHawks men's basketball team represent Miami University in the 1998–99 NCAA Division I men's basketball season. The RedHawks, led by 3rd-year head coach Charlie Coles, played their home games at Millett Hall in Oxford, Ohio as members of the Mid-American Conference. The team finished atop the conference regular season standings and, despite falling in the championship game of the MAC tournament, earned an at-large bid to the NCAA tournament. As the No. 10 seed in the Midwest region, Miami defeated Washington and Utah to reach the Sweet Sixteen. The run came to and end in the Regional semifinals as the RedHawks fell to Kentucky, 58–43, to finish 24–8 (15–3 MAC).

== Roster ==
1998–99 Miami RedHawks men's basketball team
Players
Coaches

Pos.	#	Name	Height	Weight	Year	Hometown
G	30	Damon Frierson	6 ft 4 in (1.93 m)	—	Sr
F	32	Wally Szczerbiak	6 ft 7 in (2.01 m)	244 lb (111 kg)	Sr	Long Island, New York

Head coach

- Charlie Coles (Miami (OH))

Assistant coach(es)

Legend

- (C) Team captain
- (S) Suspended
- (I) Ineligible
- (W) Walk-on
- Injured
- Current redshirt

== Schedule and results ==
Date time, TV	Rank^{#}	Opponent^{#}	Result	Record	Site (attendance) city, state
Regular season
Nov 13, 1998*		at Notre Dame	W 76–65	1–0	Joyce Center; Notre Dame, Indiana
Nov 19, 1998*		No. 18 Tennessee	W 68–62	2–0	Millett Hall; Oxford, Ohio
Nov 22, 1998*		Dayton	W 76–62	3–0	Millett Hall; Oxford, Ohio
Nov 27, 1998*	No. 24	vs. Boston University	W 70–53	4–0	Halifax Metro Center; Halifax, Nova Scotia
Dec 2, 1998*	No. 22	at No. 23 Xavier	L 56–64	4–1	Cincinnati Gardens; Cincinnati, Ohio
Dec 5, 1998*	No. 22	at Green Bay	L 60–78	4–2	Brown County Arena; Green Bay, Wisconsin
Dec 8, 1998		Marshall	W 81–79 ^{OT}	5–2 (1–0)	Millett Hall; Oxford, Ohio
Dec 12, 1998		at Central Michigan	W 81–69 ^{OT}	6–2 (2–0)	Rose Arena; Mount Pleasant, Michigan
Dec 22, 1998*		vs. San Diego	W 58–52	7–2	Selland Arena; Fresno, California
Dec 23, 1998*		at Fresno State	L 62–73	7–3	Selland Arena; Fresno, California
Dec 30, 1998		Northern Illinois	W 83–51	8–3 (3–0)	Millett Hall; Oxford, Ohio
Jan 2, 1999		Western Michigan	W 80–62	9–3 (4–0)	Millett Hall; Oxford, Ohio
Jan 6, 1999		at Eastern Michigan	W 73–49	10–3 (5–0)	Convocation Center; Ypsilanti, Michigan
Jan 8, 1999		at Buffalo	W 76–48	11–3 (6–0)	Alumni Arena; Buffalo, New York
Jan 16, 1999*		Akron	W 80–62	12–3 (7–0)	Millett Hall; Oxford, Ohio
Jan 20, 1999		at Kent State	L 62–68	12–4 (7–1)	Memorial Athletic and Convocation Center; Kent, Ohio
Jan 23, 1999		at Marshall	W 63–55	13–4 (8–1)	Cam Henderson Center; Huntington, West Virginia
Jan 28, 1999		Bowling Green State	W 83–72	14–4 (9–1)	Millett Hall; Oxford, Ohio
Feb 1, 1999		Toledo	W 63–57	15–4 (10–1)	Millett Hall; Oxford, Ohio
Feb 3, 1999		Ohio	W 69–54	16–4 (11–1)	Millett Hall; Oxford, Ohio
Feb 6, 1999		at Western Michigan	W 70–69	17–4 (12–1)	University Arena; Kalamazoo, Michigan
Feb 10, 1999		at Ball State	W 61–56	18–4 (13–1)	Worthen Arena; Muncie, Indiana
Feb 13, 1999		Eastern Michigan	W 78–56	19–4 (14–1)	Millett Hall; Oxford, Ohio
Feb 17, 1999	No. 25	at Toledo	L 63–66	19–5 (14–2)	John F. Savage Hall; Toledo, Ohio
Feb 20, 1999	No. 25	at Bowling Green State	L 58–69	19–6 (14–3)	Anderson Arena; Bowling Green, Ohio
Feb 24, 1999		Kent State	W 73–60	20–6 (15–3)	Millett Hall; Oxford, Ohio
MAC tournament
Feb 27, 1999*	(1)	(8) Ball State; Quarterfinals	W 69–43	21–6	Millett Hall; Oxford, Ohio
Mar 2, 1999*	(1)	vs. (5) Bowling Green State; Semifinals	W 60–56 ^{OT}	22–6	SeaGate Centre; Toledo, Ohio
Mar 3, 1999*	(1)	vs. (2) Kent State; Championship game	L 43–49	22–7	SeaGate Centre; Toledo, Ohio
NCAA tournament
Mar 12, 1999*; CBS	(10 MW)	vs. (7 MW) Washington; First round	W 59–58	23–7	Louisiana Superdome; New Orleans, Louisiana
Mar 14, 1999*; CBS	(10 MW)	vs. (2 MW) No. 6 Utah; Second Round	W 66–58	24–7	Louisiana Superdome; New Orleans, Louisiana
Mar 19, 1999*; CBS	(10 MW)	vs. (3 MW) No. 8 Kentucky; Midwest Regional semifinal – Sweet Sixteen	L 43–58	24–8	Edward Jones Dome; St. Louis, Missouri
*Non-conference game. ^{#}Rankings from AP poll. (#) Tournament seedings in parentheses. MW=Midwest. All times are in Eastern Time.

== Rankings ==
Ranking movements Legend: ██ Increase in ranking ██ Decrease in ranking
	Week																	
Poll	Pre	1	2	3	4	5	6	7	8	9	10	11	12	13	14	15	16	Final
AP			24	22											25			
Coaches				23														20

== 1999 NBA draft ==
Round	Pick	Player	NBA Team
1	6	Wally Szczerbiak	Minnesota Timberwolves

== Awards and honors ==
- Wally Szczerbiak – MAC Player of the Year, Consensus Second-Team All-American
