= 2000–01 Eastern Michigan Eagles men's basketball team =

American college basketball season

2000–01 Eastern Michigan Eagles men's basketball
- Conference: Mid-American Conference
- West Division
- Record: 3–25 (1–17 MAC)
- Head coach: Jim Boone (1 season)
- Home arena: Convocation Center

2000–01 Mid-American Conference men's basketball standings
	Conf.				Overall
Team	W		L	PCT	W		L	PCT
East
Kent State †	13	–	5	.722	24	–	10	.706
Marshall	12	–	6	.667	18	–	9	.667
Ohio	12	–	6	.667	19	–	11	.633
Bowling Green	10	–	8	.556	15	–	14	.517
Miami (OH)	10	–	8	.556	17	–	16	.515
Akron	9	–	9	.500	12	–	16	.429
Buffalo	2	–	16	.111	4	–	24	.143
West
Central Michigan	14	–	4	.778	20	–	8	.714
Toledo	12	–	6	.667	22	–	11	.667
Ball State	11	–	7	.611	18	–	12	.600
Western Michigan	7	–	11	.389	7	–	21	.250
Northern Illinois	4	–	14	.222	5	–	23	.179
Eastern Michigan	1	–	17	.056	3	–	25	.107
† 2001 MAC tournament winner Rankings from AP Poll

The 2000–01 Eastern Michigan Eagles men's basketball team represented Eastern Michigan University during the 2000–01 NCAA Division I men's basketball season. The Eagles, led by 1st year head coach Jim Boone. The Eagles played their home games at the Eastern Michigan University Convocation Center and were members of the West Division of the Mid-American Conference. They finished the season 3–25, 1–17 in MAC play. They finished 6th in the MAC West. They were knocked out in the first round of the MAC Tournament by the Toledo Rockets.

== Roster ==
The team captains were Mosi Barnes, C.J. Grantham, and Steve Pettyjohn.

Number	Name	Position	Height	Weight	Year	Home Town
3	Rod Wells	Guard	5–10	175	Senior	Highland Park, IL
4	C.J. Grantham	Guard	5–9	165	Sophomore	Belleville, MI
12	Melvin Hicks	Guard	6–3	200	Sophomore	Romulus, MI
14	Ricky Cottrill	Guard	6–3	195	Freshman	Poca, WV
23	Ryan Hopkins	Guard	6–5	215	Freshman	Parkersburg, WV
24	Ben Romano	Guard	6–4	220	Sophomore	Luanada, Angola
25	Mosi Barnes	Guard	6–0	175	Senior	Indianapolis, IN
40	Dante Darling	Guard/Forward	6–5	200	Sophomore	Detroit, MI
44	Ryan Prillman	Forward	6–9	245	Sophomore	New Orleans, LA
45	Tyson Radney	Forward	6–8	215	Junior	Inkster, MI
54	Shamar Herron	Forward	6–9	250	Junior	Detroit, MI
55	Mats Nordin	Center	7–0	260	Freshman	Hammaruagen, Sweden

=== Roster changes ===
Additions

- G Ricky Cottrill (FR)
- F Shamar Herron (JR)
- G Ryan Hopkins (FR)
- C Nats Nordin (FR)

Departures

- F Craig Erquhart (Graduated)
- G Larry Fisher (Graduated)
- G Antonio Gates (Transfer to Kent State)
- G DeSean Hadley (Graduated)
- G/F Adam Hess (Transfer to William & Mary)
- G Avin Howard
- C Solomon Mcgee (Graduated)
- G Corey Tarrant (Graduated)
- F Calvin Warner (transfer to Jacksonville)

== Schedule ==
Date time, TV	Opponent	Result	Record	Site (attendance) city, state
Regular Season
11–20–00*; 7:00 pm	Hampton	L 71–73	0–1	Convocation Center (1520); Ypsilanti, MI
11–25–00*; 4:05 pm	at Detroit Mercy	L 63–73	0–2	Calihan Hall (3352); Detroit, MI
11–29–00*; 9:00 pm	Green Bay	L 47–48	0–3	Convocation Center (1169); Ypsilanti, MI
12–3–00*; 7:30 pm	Tennessee Tech	L 70–86	0–4	Eblen Center (3374); Cookeville, TN
12–6–00*; 7:00 pm	IUPUI	W 67–64	1–4	Convocation Center (1019); Ypsilanti, MI
12–9–00*; 4:00 pm	vs. Iona; Marshall Memorial Classic	L 57–70	1–5	Cam Henderson Center; Huntington, WV
12–20–00*; 7:00 pm	Chicago State	L 60–71	1–6	Convocation Center (1014); Ypsilanti, MI
12–23–00*; 2:05 pm	Grambling State	W 94–77	2–6	Convocation Center (1225); Ypsilanti, MI
12–30–00*; 7:00 pm	at Michigan	L 73–90	2–7	Crisler Arena (11627); Ann Arbor, MI
1–3–01; 7:00 pm	at Kent State	L 57–70	2–8 (0–1)	Memorial Athletic and Convocation Center (2017); Kent, OH
1–6–01; 7:00 pm	Ball State	L 66–69	2–9 (0–2)	Convocation Center (1622); Ypsilanti, MI
1–10–01; 7:05 pm	Toledo	L 55–74	2–10 (0–3)	Convocation Center (2504); Ypsilanti, MI
1–13–01; 7:00 pm	Marshall	L 46–72	2–11 (0–4)	Convocation Center (1093); Ypsilanti, MI
1–17–01; 7:05 pm	at Northern Illinois	L 52–58	2–12 (0–5)	Convocation Center (1549); DeKalb, IL
1–20–01; 7:05 pm	Central Michigan	L 51–60	2–13 (0–6)	Convocation Center (3615); Ypsilanti, MI
1–24–01; 7:00 pm	at Kent State	L 75–97	2–14 (0–7)	Convocation Center (1124); Ypsilanti, MI
1–27–01; 3:40 pm	at Akron	L 56–63	2–15 (0–8)	James A. Rhodes Arena (2582); Akron, OH
1–31–01; 7:05 pm	Miami (OH)	L 48–62	2–16 (0–9)	Convocation Center (1167); Ypsilanti, MI
2–3–01; 1:00 pm	at Ball State	L 69–75	2–17 (0–10)	Worthen Arena (5688); Muncie, IN
2–7–01; 8:00 pm	at Western Michigan	W 84–73	3–17 (1–10)	Convocation Center (1875); Ypsilanti, MI
2–10–01; 2:45 pm	at Ohio	L 68–94	3–18 (1–11)	Convocation Center (9245); Athens, OH
2–12–01; 7:00 pm	at Buffalo	L 51–68	3–19 (1–12)	Alumni Arena (787); Buffalo, NY
2–17–01; 7:00 pm	Bowling Green	L 45–71	3–20 (1–13)	Convocation Center (2706); Ypsilanti, MI
2–21–01; 7:00 pm	at Toledo	L 63–76	3–21 (1–14)	Savage Hall (5912); Toledo, OH
2–24–01; 7:00 pm	Northern Illinois	L 58–62	3–22 (1–15)	Convocation Center (1566); Ypsilanti, MI
2–28–01; 7:00 pm	at Central Michigan	L 57–64	3–23 (1–16)	Rose Arena (4315); Mt. Pleasant, MI
3–3–01; 2:00 pm	at Western Michigan	L 49–60	3–24 (1–17)	University Arena (1988); Kalamazoo, MI
2001 MAC men's basketball tournament
03–01–01; 7:00 pm	at Toledo; 1st Round	L 43–67	3–25	Savage Hall (4329); Toledo, OH
*Non-conference game. ^{#}Rankings from AP Poll. (#) Tournament seedings in parentheses. All times are in Eastern Time.

== Season Highlights ==
=== 11/29 vs Green Bay ===
- Tyson Radney sets Convocation Center record with 19 rebounds in a game and with 13 rebounds in the first half.

=== 12/06 vs IUPUI ===
- Melvin Hicks scores a career high 22 points.
- Jim Boone's first win as Eastern Michigan head coach.

=== 02/07 vs Western Michigan ===
- Melvin Hicks was named Kraft player of the game.
