= 1999 MAC men's basketball tournament =

- Classification: Division I
- Season: 1998–99
- Teams: 8
- Site: SeaGate Centre; Toledo, Ohio
- Champions: Kent State (1st title)
- Winning coach: Gary Waters (1st title)
- MVP: John Whorton (Kent State)
- MAC men's basketball tournaments

The 1999 MAC men's basketball tournament, a part of the 1998–99 NCAA Division I men's basketball season, took place at SeaGate Centre in Toledo, Ohio. It was a single-elimination tournament with three rounds and included only the top eight conference teams. The quarterfinal round was held on the campus sites of the top four seeds, and the winners advanced to play the semifinal and final rounds in Toledo. It was the final Mid-American Conference men's basketball tournament held in Toledo. Miami, the MAC regular season winner, received the number one seed in the tournament. Second-seeded Kent State won the tournament with a 49–43 win over Miami and received the Mid-American Conference's automatic bid to the 1999 NCAA tournament. It was Kent State's first MAC Tournament win and marked their first appearance in the NCAA Tournament. Miami was selected as an at-large entry for the NCAA Tournament. This would be the MAC's last at-large bid until the 2026 tournament.

1998–99 Mid-American Conference men's basketball standings
	Conf.				Overall
Team	W		L	PCT	W		L	PCT
East
Miami	15	–	3	.833	24	–	8	.750
Kent State †	13	–	5	.722	23	–	7	.767
Akron	12	–	6	.667	18	–	9	.667
Ohio	12	–	6	.667	18	–	10	.643
Bowling Green	12	–	6	.667	18	–	10	.643
Marshall	11	–	7	.611	16	–	11	.593
Buffalo	1	–	17	.056	5	–	24	.172
West
Toledo	11	–	7	.611	19	–	9	.679
Ball State	10	–	8	.556	16	–	11	.593
Central Michigan	7	–	11	.389	10	–	16	.385
Western Michigan	6	–	12	.333	11	–	15	.423
Eastern Michigan	5	–	13	.278	5	–	20	.200
Northern Illinois	2	–	16	.111	6	–	20	.231
† 1999 MAC tournament winner Rankings from AP Poll

== Tournament ==
=== Seeds ===
1. Miami
2. Kent State
3. Ohio
4. Akron
5. Bowling Green
6. Toledo
7. Marshall
8. Ball State

=== Bracket ===
Quarterfinals
1	Miami	69
8	Ball State	43
4	Akron	74
5	Bowling Green	80
2	Kent State	79
7	Marshall	76
3	Ohio	70
6	Toledo	60

Semifinals
1	Miami	60*
5	Bowling Green	56
2	Kent State	68
3	Ohio	57

Finals
1	Miami	43
2	Kent State	49

* – Denotes overtime period
