= 2000–01 Ohio Bobcats men's basketball team =

American college basketball season

2000–01 Ohio Bobcats men's basketball
- Conference: Mid-American Conference
- East Division
- Record: 19–11 (12–6 MAC)
- Head coach: Larry Hunter (12th season)
- Assistant coaches: Geno Ford; John Rhodes
- Home arena: Convocation Center

2000–01 Mid-American Conference men's basketball standings
	Conf.				Overall
Team	W		L	PCT	W		L	PCT
East
Kent State †	13	–	5	.722	24	–	10	.706
Marshall	12	–	6	.667	18	–	9	.667
Ohio	12	–	6	.667	19	–	11	.633
Bowling Green	10	–	8	.556	15	–	14	.517
Miami (OH)	10	–	8	.556	17	–	16	.515
Akron	9	–	9	.500	12	–	16	.429
Buffalo	2	–	16	.111	4	–	24	.143
West
Central Michigan	14	–	4	.778	20	–	8	.714
Toledo	12	–	6	.667	22	–	11	.667
Ball State	11	–	7	.611	18	–	12	.600
Western Michigan	7	–	11	.389	7	–	21	.250
Northern Illinois	4	–	14	.222	5	–	23	.179
Eastern Michigan	1	–	17	.056	3	–	25	.107
† 2001 MAC tournament winner Rankings from AP Poll

The 2000–01 Ohio Bobcats men's basketball team represented Ohio University in the college basketball season of 2000–01. The team was coached by Larry Hunter in his 12th and final season at Ohio and played their home games at the Convocation Center. Hunter was terminated after the season for a lack of postseason success.

== Roster ==
2000–01 Ohio Bobcats men's basketball team
Players
Coaches

Pos.	#	Name	Height	Weight	Year	Hometown
G	12	Jason Crawford	6 ft 4 in (1.93 m)	220 lb (100 kg)	Jr	Cincinnati, Ohio
G	25	Steve Esterkamp	6 ft 6 in (1.98 m)	200 lb (91 kg)	So	Cincinnati, Ohio
F	40	Patrick Flomo	6 ft 9 in (2.06 m)	205 lb (93 kg)	Jr	Columbus, Ohio
G	4	Dustin Ford	5 ft 10 in (1.78 m)	180 lb (82 kg)	Sr	Cambridge, Ohio
G	40	Jaivon Harris	6 ft 5 in (1.96 m)	195 lb (88 kg)	Fr	Alliance, Ohio
G	3	Adam Howell	6 ft 3 in (1.91 m)	185 lb (84 kg)	So	Lexington, Kentucky
F	34	Brandon Hunter	6 ft 7 in (2.01 m)	260 lb (118 kg)	So	Cincinnati, OH
G/F	5	Anthony Jones	6 ft 4 in (1.93 m)	200 lb (91 kg)	So	Austin, Texas
F	44	Alex Liatsos	6 ft 8 in (2.03 m)	215 lb (98 kg)	Fr	Limassol
C	42	Shaun McVicker	6 ft 9 in (2.06 m)	250 lb (113 kg)	So	New Concord, Ohio
F	33	Jon Sanderson	6 ft 7 in (2.01 m)	230 lb (104 kg)	Jr	Lexington, Ohio
F	31	Kevin Shorter	6 ft 8 in (2.03 m)	200 lb (91 kg)	Fr	Clinton Township, Michigan
G	22	Thomas Stephens	6 ft 0 in (1.83 m)	170 lb (77 kg)	Fr	Springfield, Ohio

Head coach

- Larry Hunter

Assistant coach(es)

- Geno Ford
- John Rhodes
- Jeff Hamilton

Legend

- (C) Team captain
- (S) Suspended
- (I) Ineligible
- (W) Walk-on
- Injured
- Current redshirt

Roster

== Preseason ==
The preseason poll was announced by the league office on October 4, 2000. Ohio was picked fifth in the MAC East.

=== Preseason men's basketball poll ===
(First place votes in parentheses)

==== East Division ====
1. Marshall (29) 265
2. Kent State (11) 229
3. Bowling Green 174
4. Miami 165
5. Ohio 144
6. Akron 100
7. Buffalo 43

==== West Division ====
1. Ball State (20) 219
2. Toledo (19) 213
3. Central Michigan (1) 133
4. Eastern Michigan 122
5. Northern Illinois 79
6. Western Michigan 74

==== Tournament champs ====
Marshall (14), Ball State (10), Kent State (7), Toledo (6), Bowling Green (1), Miami (1), Central Michigan (1)

== Schedule and results ==
Date time, TV	Rank^{#}	Opponent^{#}	Result	Record	Site (attendance) city, state
Regular Season
11/22/00*; 7:00 pm		Rio Grande	W 91–70	1–0	Convocation Center (3,648); Athens, OH
12/2/00*; 8:30 pm		Niagara	W 77–64	2–0	Convocation Center (5,300); Athens, OH
12/6/00*; 7:30 pm		at No. 16 Virginia	L 71–90	2–1	John Paul Jones Arena (7,750); Charlottesville, VA
12/9/00*; 4:00 pm		at No. 17 Wisconsin	L 46–65	2–2	Kohl Center (16,190); Madison, WI
12/12/00*; 7:35 pm		at Duquesne	L 89–94	2–3	A. J. Palumbo Center (4,483); Pittsburgh, PA
12/16/00; 2:00 pm		at Western Michigan	L 65–76	2–4 (0–1)	University Arena (2,758); Kalamazoo, MI
12/19/00*; 7:00 pm		West Virginia	W 79–67	3–4 (0–1)	Convocation Center (7,314); Athens, OH
12/22/00*; 7:00 pm		at Oakland	W 92–85	4–4 (0–1)	Athletics Center O'rena (1,253); Rochester, MI
12/29/00*; 10:30 pm		vs. Arizona State; AZcentral.com Holiday Classic 1st Round	W 75–71	5–4 (0–1)	Wells-Fargo Arena (8,118); Tempe, AZ
12/30/00*; 10:30 pm		vs. Pepperdine; AZcentral.com Holiday Classic 2nd Round	L 76–78 ^{OT}	5–5 (0–1)	Wells-Fargo Arena (7,852); Tempe, AZ
MAC regular season
1/2/01; 7:00 pm		at Ball State	W 68–58	6–5 (1–1)	John E. Worthen Arena (4,099); Muncie, IN
1/8/01; 7:00 pm		Kent State	W 67–65	7–5 (2–1)	Convocation Center (7,812); Athens, OH
12/13/01; 6:00 pm		Miami (OH)	W 62–60 ^{OT}	8–5 (3–1)	Convocation Center (9,510); Athens, OH
12/17/01; 7:00 pm		at Central Michigan	L 69–75	8–6 (3–2)	McGuirk Arena (3,418); Mount Pleasant, MI
1/20/01; 4:00 pm		Akron	W 85–67	9–6 (4–2)	Convocation Center (8,001); Athens, OH
1/23/01; 7:00 pm		Northern Illinois	W 91–63	10–6 (5–2)	Convocation Center (6,214); Athens, OH
1/27/01; 7:00 pm		at Buffalo	W 83–66	11–6 (6–2)	Alumni Arena (1,612); Buffalo, NY
1/31/01; 4:00 pm		at Toledo	L 53–66	11–7 (6–3)	Savage Arena (5,073); Toledo, OH
2/3/01; 1:00 pm		Marshall	W 77–71	12–7 (7–3)	Convocation Center (9,201); Athens, OH
2/7/01; 7:00 pm		Bowling Green	L 68–78	12–8 (7–4)	Convocation Center (7,881); Athens, OH
2/10/01; 2:30 pm		Eastern Michigan	W 94–68	13–8 (8–4)	Convocation Center (9,245); Athens, OH
2/14/01; 4:00 pm		at Akron	W 70–61	14–8 (9–4)	Rhodes Arena (2,524); Akron, OH
2/17/01; 4:00 pm		at Marshall	L 70–92	14–9 (9–5)	Cam Henderson Center (9,016); Huntington, WV
2/21/01; 7:00 pm		Buffalo	W 86–76	15–9 (10–5)	Convocation Center (6,340); Athens, OH
2/24/01; 2:00 pm		at Kent State	W 69–63	16–9 (11–5)	MAC Center (5,711); Kent, OH
2/26/01; 8:00 pm		Central Michigan	W 77–64	17–9 (12–5)	Convocation Center (7,415); Athens, OH
2/28/01; 7:00 pm		at Miami (OH)	L 72–76	17–10 (12–6)	Millett Hall (5,655); Oxford, OH
MAC tournament
3/5/01; 7:30 pm		Buffalo; 1st Round	W 101–78	18–10	Convocation Center (7,112); Athens, OH
3/8/01; 2:30 pm		vs. Toledo; Quarterfinals	W 64–63	19–10	Gund Arena (4,623); Cleveland, OH
3/9/01; 7:00 pm		vs. Miami (OH); Semifinals	L 61–62	19–11	Gund Arena (9,270); Cleveland, OH
*Non-conference game. ^{#}Rankings from AP Poll. (#) Tournament seedings in parentheses. All times are in Eastern.

== Statistics ==
=== Team statistics ===
Final 2000–01 statistics

Record	Ohio	OPP
Scoring	2248	2132
Scoring Average	74.93	71.07
Field goals – Att	771–1687	696–1629
3-pt. Field goals – Att	196–564	165–450
Free throws – Att	510–761	575–825
Rebounds	1108	1025
Assists	446	358
Turnovers	462	440
Steals	215	200
Blocked Shots	146	64

=== Player statistics ===
			Minutes		Scoring		Total FGs			3-point FGs			Free-Throws			Rebounds								
Player	GP	GS	Tot	Avg	Pts	Avg	FG	FGA	Pct	3FG	3FA	Pct	FT	FTA	Pct	Off	Def	Tot	Avg	A	PF	TO	Stl	Blk
Brandon Hunter	30	30	988	32.9	543	18.1	181	355	0.51	3	9	0.333	178	271	0.657	81	201	282	9.4	80	76	117	23	15
Anthony Jones	29	27	-	-	369	12.7	127	321	0.396	24	76	0.316	91	124	0.734	33	79	112	3.9	99	94	113	50	5
Steve Esterkamp	30	17	-	-	321	10.7	108	237	0.456	45	114	0.395	60	75	0.8	36	74	110	3.7	51	78	43	29	3
Patrick Flomo	30	27	-	-	273	9.1	100	158	0.633	0	0	0	73	120	0.608	82	114	196	6.5	36	86	44	23	105
Jon Sanderson	30	23	-	-	268	8.9	98	238	0.412	46	138	0.333	26	44	0.591	53	60	113	3.8	27	72	23	16	11
Dustin Ford	29	23	-	-	221	7.6	66	179	0.369	46	129	0.357	43	58	0.741	13	53	66	2.3	75	76	40	39	2
Thomas Stephens	28	2	-	-	67	2.4	24	60	0.4	15	42	0.357	4	9	0.444	4	27	31	1.1	42	52	21	14	1
Jaivon Harris	27	0	-	-	65	2.4	23	57	0.404	13	38	0.342	6	9	0.667	13	22	35	1.3	5	49	10	9	0
Alex Liastos	20	0	-	-	46	2.3	17	33	0.515	0	4	0	12	16	0.75	11	16	27	1.4	9	20	12	4	0
Shaun McVicker	29	1	-	-	30	1	10	15	0.667	0	0	0	10	19	0.526	14	28	42	1.4	12	54	19	3	1
Jason Crawford	24	0	-	-	20	0.8	8	15	0.533	1	3	0.333	3	4	0.75	2	7	9	0.4	7	30	10	3	3
Adam Howell	16	0	-	-	20	1.3	7	14	0.5	3	10	0.3	3	10	0.3	1	3	4	0.3	2	5	3	2	0
Ryan Smith	7	0	-	-	5	0.7	2	5	0.4	0	1	0	1	2	0.5	1	5	6	0.9	1	2	1	0	0
Total	30	-	-	-	2248	74.9	771	1687	0.457	196	564	0.348	510	761	0.670	384	724	1108	36.9	446	695	462	215	146
Opponents	30	-	-	-	2132	71.1	696	1629	0.427	165	450	0.367	575	825	0.697	347	678	1025	34.2	358	663	440	200	64

Legend
GP	Games played	GS	Games started	Avg	Average per game
FG	Field-goals made	FGA	Field-goal attempts	Off	Offensive rebounds
Def	Defensive rebounds	A	Assists	TO	Turnovers
Blk	Blocks	Stl	Steals	High	Team high

== Awards and honors ==
=== All-MAC Awards ===
Postseason All-MAC teams
Team	Player	Position	Year
All-MAC First Team	Brandon Hunter	F	So.
All-MAC Honorable Mention	Patrick Flomo	F	Sr.
