= Gary Waters =

American college basketball coach (born 1951)

Biographical details
- Born: August 15, 1951 (age 75); Highland Park, Michigan, U.S.

Playing career
- 1972–1974: Ferris State

Coaching career (HC unless noted)
- 1974–1989: Ferris State (assistant)
- 1989–1993: Eastern Michigan (assistant)
- 1993–1996: Eastern Michigan (associate HC)
- 1996–2001: Kent State
- 2001–2006: Rutgers
- 2006–2017: Cleveland State

Head coaching record
- Overall: 365–307

Accomplishments and honors

Championships
- MAC regular season (2001); 2× MAC tournament (1999, 2001); Horizon League regular season (2011); Horizon League tournament (2009)

Awards
- MAC Coach of the Year (1999, 2000); Horizon League Coach of the Year (2008)

Gary Steven Waters (born August 15, 1951) is an American college basketball coach and the former men's basketball head coach at Cleveland State University.

== Coaching career ==
=== Kent State ===
On April 3, 1996 Waters was named the 21st head coach at Kent State. On July 6, 2000 Waters signed a 6-year contract extension.

=== Rutgers ===
On April 6, 2001 Waters was named the 15th head coach at Rutgers. He previously coached at Rutgers University, guiding the Scarlet Knights to the NIT tournament final in 2004. Waters announced his resignation from Rutgers on March 1, 2006 and accepted a buyout from Rutgers worth about $550,000. He officially resigned after he coached his last game for Rutgers on March 16, 2006.

=== Cleveland State ===
Waters was named the 14th head basketball coach at Cleveland State University on April 6, 2006. On September 12, 2006 he signed his contract with a base salary of $225,000 a year. In 2008 Waters was named the Horizon League coach of the year. On October 27, 2008 Waters signed a 5-year rollover contract extension with Cleveland State with a base salary of $283,264 a year. On November 8, 2012 Waters signed a 7-year contract extension with Cleveland State with a base salary of $340,000. On March 7, 2017 Gary Waters announced his retirement from Cleveland State.

== Personal life ==
Gary Steven Waters is a Detroit, Michigan native and a 1969 graduate of Mackenzie High School. Waters graduated with a B.S. in Business Administration from Ferris State in 1975, a B.S. in Business Education from Ferris State in 1978 and an M.A. in Educational Administration from Central Michigan in 1976. Waters is also a member of the Ferris State University Hall of Fame. He is married to Bernadette Amos, with two children Sean and Seena.

== NBA players coached ==
| Player | Draft | Pro Team(s) |
Kent State
| John Edwards | Undrafted | Pacers, Hawks |
Rutgers
| Quincy Douby | 19th, Sacramento Kings, 2006 NBA draft | Kings, Raptors |
Cleveland State
| Cedric Jackson | Undrafted | Cavaliers, Spurs, Wizards |
| Norris Cole | 28th, Chicago Bulls, 2011 NBA draft | Heat, Pelicans |
| Bryn Forbes | Undrafted | Spurs |

== Head coaching record ==
Record table
| Season | Team | Overall | Conference | Standing | Postseason |
|---|---|---|---|---|---|
Kent State Golden Flashes (Mid-American Conference) (1996–2001)
| 1996–97 | Kent State | 9–18 | 7–11 | 7th | |
| 1997–98 | Kent State | 13–17 | 9–9 | T–2nd (East) | |
| 1998–99 | Kent State | 23–7 | 13–5 | 2nd (East) | NCAA Division I First Round |
| 1999–00 | Kent State | 23–8 | 13–5 | 2nd (East) | NIT Quarterfinal |
| 2000–01 | Kent State | 24–10 | 13–5 | 1st (East) | NCAA Division I Second Round |
| Kent State: | | 92–60 (.605) | 55–35 (.611) | | |
Rutgers Scarlet Knights (Big East Conference) (2001–2006)
| 2001–02 | Rutgers | 18–13 | 8–8 | 5th (West) | NIT First Round |
| 2002–03 | Rutgers | 12–16 | 4–12 | 7th (West) | |
| 2003–04 | Rutgers | 20–13 | 7–9 | T–8th | NIT Runner-up |
| 2004–05 | Rutgers | 10–19 | 2–14 | 12th | |
| 2005–06 | Rutgers | 19–14 | 7–9 | T–9th | NIT First Round |
| Rutgers: | | 79–75 (.513) | 28–52 (.350) | | |
Cleveland State Vikings (Horizon League) (2006–2017)
| 2006–07 | Cleveland State | 10–21 | 3–13 | 9th | |
| 2007–08 | Cleveland State | 21–13 | 12–6 | T–2nd | NIT First Round |
| 2008–09 | Cleveland State | 26–11 | 12–6 | T–3rd | NCAA Division I Second Round |
| 2009–10 | Cleveland State | 16–17 | 10–8 | T–4th | |
| 2010–11 | Cleveland State | 27–9 | 13–5 | T–1st | NIT Second Round |
| 2011–12 | Cleveland State | 22–11 | 12–6 | 2nd | NIT First Round |
| 2012–13 | Cleveland State | 14–18 | 5–11 | T–7th | |
| 2013–14 | Cleveland State | 21–12 | 12–4 | 2nd | CIT First Round |
| 2014–15 | Cleveland State | 19–15 | 11–5 | T–3rd | CIT Second Round |
| 2015–16 | Cleveland State | 9–23 | 4–14 | 9th | |
| 2016–17 | Cleveland State | 9–22 | 5–13 | T–8th | |
| Cleveland State: | | 194–172 (.530) | 99–93 (.516) | | |
| Total: | | 365–307 (.543) | | | |
National champion Postseason invitational champion Conference regular season champion Conference regular season and conference tournament champion Division regular season champion Division regular season and conference tournament champion Conference tournament champion
