= 1998–99 Ohio Bobcats men's basketball team =

American college basketball season

1998–99 Ohio Bobcats men's basketball
- Conference: Mid-American Conference
- East Division
- Record: 18–10 (12–6 MAC)
- Head coach: Larry Hunter (10th season)
- Home arena: Convocation Center

1998–99 Mid-American Conference men's basketball standings
	Conf.				Overall
Team	W		L	PCT	W		L	PCT
East
Miami	15	–	3	.833	24	–	8	.750
Kent State †	13	–	5	.722	23	–	7	.767
Akron	12	–	6	.667	18	–	9	.667
Ohio	12	–	6	.667	18	–	10	.643
Bowling Green	12	–	6	.667	18	–	10	.643
Marshall	11	–	7	.611	16	–	11	.593
Buffalo	1	–	17	.056	5	–	24	.172
West
Toledo	11	–	7	.611	19	–	9	.679
Ball State	10	–	8	.556	16	–	11	.593
Central Michigan	7	–	11	.389	10	–	16	.385
Western Michigan	6	–	12	.333	11	–	15	.423
Eastern Michigan	5	–	13	.278	5	–	20	.200
Northern Illinois	2	–	16	.111	6	–	20	.231
† 1999 MAC tournament winner Rankings from AP Poll

The 1998–99 Ohio Bobcats men's basketball team represented Ohio University in the college basketball season of 1998–99. The team was coached by Larry Hunter and played their home games at the Convocation Center.

== Roster ==
1998–99 Ohio Bobcats men's basketball team
Players
Coaches

Pos.	#	Name	Height	Weight	Year	Hometown
G/F	30	Sanjay Adell	6 ft 6 in (1.98 m)	230 lb (104 kg)	So	Milwaukee, WI
G	12	Jason Crawford	6 ft 4 in (1.93 m)	220 lb (100 kg)	Fr	Cincinnati, OH
F	32	Diante Flenorl	6 ft 9 in (2.06 m)	215 lb (98 kg)	Jr	Milwaukee, WI
F	40	Patrick Flomo	6 ft 9 in (2.06 m)	205 lb (93 kg)	Fr	Columbus, OH
G	4	Dustin Ford	5 ft 10 in (1.78 m)	180 lb (82 kg)	So	Cambridge, OH
G	10	Corey Reed	5 ft 10 in (1.78 m)	175 lb (79 kg)	Sr	Milwaukee, WI
F	33	Shaun Stonerook	6 ft 8 in (2.03 m)	230 lb (104 kg)	Jr	Westerville, OH
C	52	Nick Terry	6 ft 11 in (2.11 m)	260 lb (118 kg)	So	Mount Gilead, OH
F	24	Jeremy Thrapp	6 ft 4 in (1.93 m)	210 lb (95 kg)	Fr	Nelsonville, OH
G	5	LeDrell Whitehead	5 ft 9 in (1.75 m)	180 lb (82 kg)	Jr	New Albany, IN

Head coach

- Larry Hunter

Assistant coach(es)

- Mike Elfers
- James Jones
- Geno Ford

Legend

- (C) Team captain
- (S) Suspended
- (I) Ineligible
- (W) Walk-on
- Injured
- Current redshirt

Roster
Last update: July 5, 2014

== Schedule and results ==
Date time, TV	Rank^{#}	Opponent^{#}	Result	Record	Site (attendance) city, state
Regular Season
11/28/98*; 3:00 pm		Wilmington	W 107–56	1–0	Convocation Center (2,912); Athens, OH
12/2/98; 7:00 pm		Bowling Green	W 64–57	2–0 (1–0)	Convocation Center (4,415); Athens, OH
12/4/98*; 8:00 pm		at No. 12 Syracuse; Carrier Classic 1st Round	W 61–55	3–0 (1–0)	Carrier Dome (19,327); Syracuse, NY
12/5/98*; 8:00 pm		vs. Illinois-Chicago; Carrier Classic Championship Game	W 78–69	4–0 (1–0)	Carrier Dome (19,903); Syracuse, NY
12/8/98*; 7:55 pm		at Cleveland State	L 61–64	4–1 (1–0)	Wolstein Center (5,327); Cleveland, OH
12/12/98*; 3:00 pm		Rhode Island	L 73–85	4–2 (1–0)	Convocation Center (7,486); Athens, OH
12/15/98; 8:05 pm		at Northern Illinois	W 86–58	5–2 (2–0)	Convocation Center (7,486); DeKalb, IL
12/17/98*; 7:00 pm		West Virginia	W 90–72	6–2 (2–0)	Convocation Center (7,862); Athens, OH
12/22/98; 7:00 pm		Ball State	W 76–64	7–2 (3–0)	Convocation Center (4,096); Athens, OH
12/28/98*; 7:30 pm		at Central Florida	W 94–66	8–2 (3–0)	UCF Arena (1,191); Orlando, FL
12/30/98*; 7:30 pm		at George Washington	L 65–76	8–3 (3–0)	Charles E. Smith Center (3,123); Washington, DC
MAC regular season
1/2/99; 3:00 pm		Central Michigan	W 78–72	9–3 (4–0)	Convocation Center (4,861); Athens, OH
1/6/99; 8:00 pm		at Western Michigan	W 96–76	10–3 (5–0)	University Arena (1,886); Kalamazoo, MI
1/9/99; 2:00 pm		at Toledo	L 60–74	10–4 (5–1)	Savage Arena (6,131); Toledo, OH
1/13/99; 7:00 pm		Eastern Michigan	W 79–67	11–4 (6–1)	Convocation Center (7,231); Athens, OH
1/16/99; 12:00 pm		Buffalo	W 90–50	12–4 (7–1)	Convocation Center (7,768); Athens, OH
1/20/99; 8:00 pm		at Akron	L 87–94	12–5 (7–2)	Rhodes Arena (3,403); Akron, OH
1/23/99; 1:00 pm		at Bowling Green	W 75–68	13–5 (8–2)	Anderson Arena (4,182); Bowling Green, OH
1/27/99; 7:00 pm		at Kent State	L 70–71	13–6 (8–3)	MAC Center (3,175); Kent, OH
1/30/99; 7:00 pm		Marshall	W 86–73	14–6 (9–3)	Convocation Center (10,189); Athens, OH
2/3/99; 7:00 pm		at Miami (OH)	L 54–69	14–7 (9–4)	Millett Hall (7,675); Oxford, OH
2/6/99; 3:30 pm		at Central Michigan	L 67–70	14–8 (9–5)	McGuirk Arena (3,873); Mount Pleasant, MI
2/13/99; 12:00 pm		Western Michigan	W 74–55	15–8 (10–5)	Convocation Center (5,516); Athens, OH
2/17/99; 7:05 pm		at Eastern Michigan	W 67–57	16–8 (11–5)	Convocation Center (1,501); Ypsilanti, Michigan
2/20/99; 3:00 pm		Kent State	L 77–86	16–9 (11–6)	Convocation Center (12,128); Athens, OH
2/24/99; 7:00 pm		Akron	W 85–64	17–9 (12–6)	Convocation Center (5,593); Athens, OH
MAC tournament
2/27/99; 7:00 pm		Toledo	W 70–60	18–9 (12–6)	Convocation Center (5,319); Athens, OH
3/2/99; 9:00 pm		vs. Kent State	L 57–68	18–10 (12–6)	SeaGate Convention Centre (4,520); Toledo, OH
*Non-conference game. ^{#}Rankings from AP Poll. (#) Tournament seedings in parentheses. All times are in Eastern.

== Statistics ==
=== Team statistics ===
Final 1998–99 statistics

Record	Ohio	OPP
Scoring	2127	1897
Scoring Average	75.96	67.75
Field goals – Att	732–1564	643–1584
3-pt. Field goals – Att	159–474	148–437
Free throws – Att	504–731	463–643
Rebounds	1096	914
Assists	448	314
Turnovers	473	438
Steals	215	246
Blocked Shots	103	67

=== Player statistics ===
			Minutes		Scoring		Total FGs			3-point FGs			Free-Throws			Rebounds								
Player	GP	GS	Tot	Avg	Pts	Avg	FG	FGA	Pct	3FG	3FA	Pct	FT	FTA	Pct	Off	Def	Tot	Avg	A	PF	TO	Stl	Blk
Ladrell Whitehead	28	-	-	-	529	18.9	171	427	0.4	67	204	0.328	120	149	0.805	0	0	94	3.4	88	0	0	45	2
Sanjay Adell	28	-	-	-	446	15.9	148	300	0.493	38	91	0.418	112	163	0.687	0	0	172	6.1	55	0	0	18	12
Shaun Stonerook	28	-	-	-	380	13.6	119	217	0.548	14	49	0.286	128	190	0.674	0	0	256	9.1	101	0	100	59	17
Diante Flenorl	28	-	-	-	276	9.9	121	250	0.484	2	8	0.25	32	64	0.5	0	0	174	6.2	52	0	0	11	23
Dustin Ford	28	-	-	-	154	5.5	44	122	0.361	31	92	0.337	35	44	0.795	0	0	66	2.4	49	0	0	28	3
Patrick Flomo	28	-	-	-	150	5.4	60	90	0.667	0	1	0	30	49	0.612	0	0	118	4.2	19	0	0	14	27
Corey Reed	27	-	-	-	99	3.7	37	86	0.43	0	5	0	25	37	0.676	0	0	52	1.9	58	0	0	30	7
Nick Terry	22	-	-	-	40	1.8	13	21	0.619	0	0	0	14	19	0.737	0	0	31	1.4	9	0	0	2	12
Jason Crawford	28	-	-	-	39	1.4	13	36	0.361	5	18	0.278	8	16	0.5	0	0	22	0.8	17	0	0	8	0
Jeremy Thrapp	11	-	-	-	14	1.3	6	15	0.4	2	6	0.333	0	0	0	0	0	8	0.7	0	0	0	0	0
Total	28	-	-	-	2127	76.0	732	1564	0.468	159	474	0.335	504	731	0.689	374	722	1096	39.1	448	567	473	215	103
Opponents	28	-	-	-	1897	67.8	643	1584	0.406	148	437	0.339	463	643	0.720	336	578	914	32.6	314	592	438	246	67

Legend
GP	Games played	GS	Games started	Avg	Average per game
FG	Field-goals made	FGA	Field-goal attempts	Off	Offensive rebounds
Def	Defensive rebounds	A	Assists	TO	Turnovers
Blk	Blocks	Stl	Steals	High	Team high
