= Brandon Hunter =

American basketball player (1980–2023)

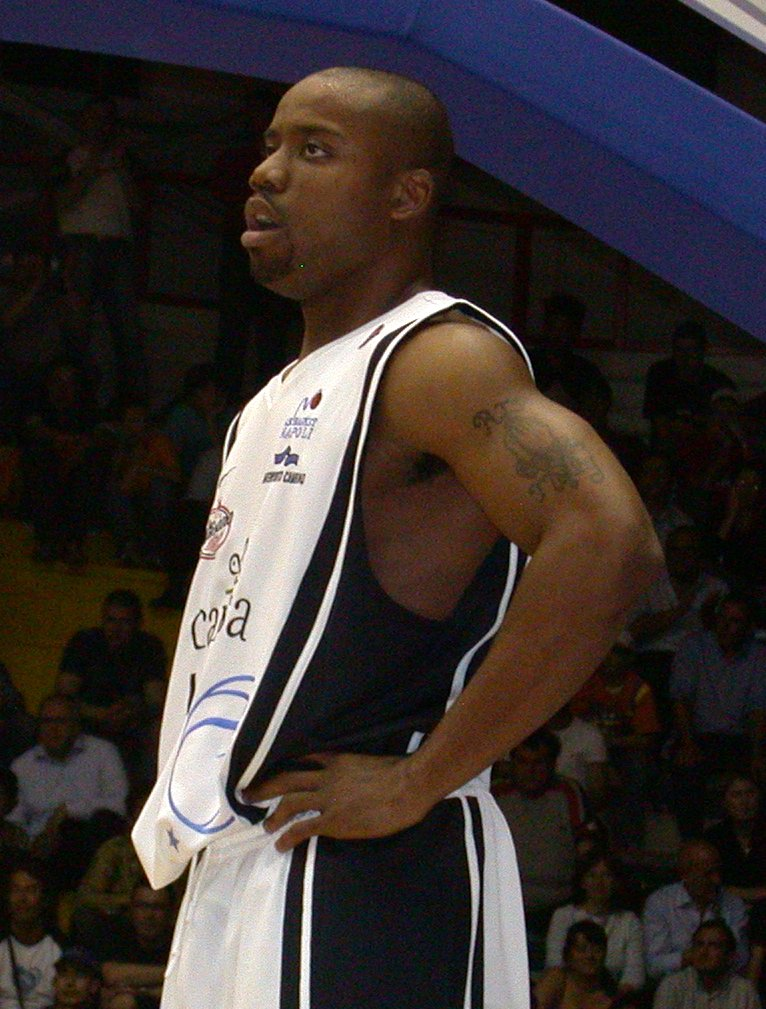
- Hunter with Napoli in 2006

Personal information
- Born: November 24, 1980 Cincinnati, Ohio, U.S.
- Died: September 12, 2023 (aged 42) Orlando, Florida, U.S.
- Listed height: 6 ft 7 in (2.01 m)
- Listed weight: 266 lb (121 kg)

Career information
- High school: Withrow (Cincinnati, Ohio)
- College: Ohio (1999–2003)
- NBA draft: 2003: 2nd round, 56th overall pick
- Drafted by: Boston Celtics
- Playing career: 2003–2013
- Position: Power forward
- Number: 56, 34

Career history
- 2003–2004: Boston Celtics
- 2004–2005: Orlando Magic
- 2005: Sioux Falls Skyforce
- 2006: Panathinaikos
- 2006: Carpisa Napoli
- 2006–2007: Livorno
- 2007–2008: Angelico Biella
- 2008: Capitanes de Arecibo
- 2008–2009: Premiata Montegranaro
- 2009–2010: Hapoel Jerusalem
- 2010–2011: Aliağa Petkim
- 2011: Ventspils
- 2011–2012: BBC Bayreuth
- 2012–2013: Hapoel Gilboa Galil
- 2013: Entente Orléanaise
- 2013: ALM Évreux Basket
- 2013: Club Atlético Aguada

Career highlights
- NCAA rebounding leader (2003); 3× First-team All-MAC (2001–2003); MAC All-Freshman Team (2000)
- Stats at NBA.com
- Stats at Basketball Reference

Brandon Hunter (November 24, 1980 – September 12, 2023) was an American professional basketball player in the National Basketball Association (NBA).

After a college basketball career with the Ohio Bobcats, leading the NCAA in rebounding in 2002–03, he was selected by the Boston Celtics in the second round of the 2003 NBA draft. After playing one season apiece for the Celtics and the Orlando Magic in the NBA, he started a journeyman playing career, mostly in Europe.

== High school career ==
Hunter attended Withrow High School in his hometown of Cincinnati. With the Tigers he averaged 13 points and 11 rebounds as they reached the state semifinals during his junior year. He committed to Ohio, playing in the Mid-American Conference (MAC) of the NCAA Division I, prior to his senior year.

In 2017, Brandon was inducted into the Withrow Athletic Hall of Fame with Xavier product and NBA standout Tyrone Hill, Horace Pumphrey (football), Joe Brefeld (baseball, basketball, football) and Skyler Willis (volleyball, track).

== College career ==
Hunter ranked third for scoring (11.3 ppg) and second in rebounds (6.2 rpg) during his freshman year in 1999–2000, leading to a selection to the MAC All-Freshman Team.

Playing more than nearly 33 minutes per game (first for the team) during his sophomore year, he finished in the conference top five for scoring (18.1 ppg) and rebounding (9.4 rpg, 23rd in nation). Good performances in the MAC tournament, including a record 32 free throw attempts in three games, led to a selection to the All-Tournament Team, also making the 2001 All-MAC First Team.

His junior season provided similar numbers, again leading the team in minutes, scoring (17.3 ppg) and rebounding (9.1 rpg, 41st in nation), with a successive All-MAC First Team selection. He declared as an early entry candidate for the NBA draft in May 2002 but he did not hire an agent – retaining his eligibility – and declared he would withdraw if he wasn't considered "first-round material", which he did later.

Hunter reached his college career peak as a senior, leading the whole NCAA Division I in 2002–03 with 12.6 rebounds on average. Hunter added 21.5 points, 2.6 assists, 1.2 blocks and 0.8 steals on average, also leading the nation in doubles-doubles (24). Four MAC Player of the Week nominations would lead to his third consecutive All-MAC First Team selection, on par with former Bobcat Gary Trent, he also led his team in scoring and rebounding for the third season in a row.

His career 1,103 rebounds and 2,012 points allowed him to join the exclusive 2,000-point, 1,000-rebound club. As of 2015, he ranked as the best rebounder in Ohio University history, the fifth-best scorer, joint ninth-best shot blocker (87), also ranking first in free throws made (561 out of 923, also first).

== Professional career ==
=== NBA ===
Hunter was selected as a second round draft choice (56th overall) by the Boston Celtics in the 2003 NBA draft. He played in the Reebok Pro Summer League with the Celtics, averaging 16.3 points (fifth for the league, second for the Celtics) and leading the Celtics with 8.2 rebounds per game (third overall, ahead of Udonis Haslem and LeBron James) in 32.8 minutes per game (first for the Celtics), being named to the tournament first team alongside Devin Brown of the San Antonio Spurs and Donny Marshall of the New Jersey Nets. This led to him signing a contract with the Celtics in July 2003.

Hunter played his first NBA game on January 9, 2004, wearing the number 56 as a symbolic nod to his draft position. He played 36 games for the Celtics in his rookie season, averaging 3.5 points and 3.3 rebounds per game in his rookie season. He played in 3 of the 4 games of the playoff series against the Indiana Pacers, who swept the Celtics in four games.

Hunter was left unprotected by the Celtics and was selected by the Charlotte Bobcats in the 2004 NBA expansion draft on June 22, 2004. He didn't play a season game for the Bobcats as he was traded to the Orlando Magic for Keith Bogans on November 1, 2004. In Orlando he averaged 3.1 points and 2.2 rebounds on average in 31 games.

Hunter's final NBA game ended up being during his time with the Magic. His final game was played on April 20, 2005, in a 93–98 loss to the Miami Heat where he recorded 4 points and 3 rebounds.

Hunter was signed by the Milwaukee Bucks as a free-agent in September 2005 but was waived a month later. After a stint with the Sioux Falls Skyforce of the Continental Basketball Association Hunter moved overseas.

Brandon was then signed by the Cleveland Cavaliers on October 3, 2006, joining LeBron James and playing in the NBA Summer League before being released two weeks later.

In 2007, he returned to the US and played in the 2007 Summer League for the New Jersey Nets.

=== International ===
The American joined Panathinaikos of the Greek Basket League in 2006, playing in two league games and two Euroleague games, after a hand injury in one of the latter games, he was released.

Hunter then joined Carpisa Napoli of the Italian Serie A in March 2006.

Returning to the U.S. after the end of the season, he was signed by the Cleveland Cavaliers on October 3, 2006, playing in the NBA Summer League before being released two weeks later.

Hunter then returned to Italy, signing with TDShop.it Livorno where he played for the 2006–07 season as Livorno finished last.

After a 2007 Summer League participation for the New Jersey Nets yielded no contract, he joined his third Serie A team, Angelico Biella where he played the whole Serie A season.

Hunter joined Capitanes de Arecibo of the Puerto Rican Baloncesto Superior Nacional later in 2008, leaving in May over disagreements due to him attending tryouts in the U.S., he then played in the Summer League for the New York Knicks.

Hunter returned to Italy for the fourth consecutive year, this time with Premiata Montegranaro, he finished the 2008–09 season as the league's best rebounder.

Hunter joined Hapoel Jerusalem of the Israeli Basketball Super League for the 2009–10 season, with Hapoel reaching the Final Four, whilst they also reached Europe's second tier Eurocup quarterfinals, with Hunter contributing two week MVP performances, in January, and March 2010.

Hunter joined Aliağa Petkim of the Turkish Basketball League, playing part of 2010–11 there before finishing the season with Latvians BK Ventspils.

In 2011–2012 he played with German side BBC Bayreuth in the Basketball Bundesliga.

Returning to Israel, he joined Hapoel Gilboa Galil, playing there until January 2013, when he joined French team Orléans Loiret Basket in the Pro A as an injury replacement player. He stayed until April 2013, again signing as an injury replacement for French team ALM Évreux Basket, of the second division Pro B.

A stint with Uruguayan champion Club Atlético Aguada of the Liga Uruguaya de Basketball from August to November 2013 was his last playing experience.

== Coaching career ==
Hunter coached in the Cincinnati area with the private coaching service CoachUp.

== Personal life ==
As of June 2015, Hunter worked as a real estate broker, he also worked as an NBPA and FIBA certified sports agent. As of June 2021, Hunter founded the full service sports management company Hunter Athlete Management.

Hunter held an endorsement contract with the basketball brand AND1.

Hunter died on September 12, 2023, at the age of 42. It was reported that Hunter was performing hot yoga at an Orlando, Florida yoga studio when he collapsed.

== Career statistics ==
Legend
GP	Games played	GS	Games started	MPG	Minutes per game
FG%	Field goal percentage	3P%	3-point field goal percentage	FT%	Free throw percentage
RPG	Rebounds per game	APG	Assists per game	SPG	Steals per game
BPG	Blocks per game	PPG	Points per game	**Bold**	Career high

=== NBA ===
==== Regular season ====
Year	Team	GP	GS	MPG	FG%	3P%	FT%	RPG	APG	SPG	BPG	PPG
2003–04	Boston	**36**	**12**	**11.3**	.457	.000	.442	**3.3**	**.5**	**.4**	.0	**3.5**
2004–05	Orlando	31	0	7.2	**.507**	–	**.538**	2.2	.1	.1	**.2**	3.1
Career		67	12	9.4	.476	.000	.488	2.8	.3	.3	.1	3.3

==== Playoffs ====
Year	Team	GP	GS	MPG	FG%	3P%	FT%	RPG	APG	SPG	BPG	PPG
2004	Boston	3	0	3.3	1.000	–	–	1.0	.3	.0	.3	.7

== See also ==
- List of NCAA Division I men's basketball season rebounding leaders
- List of NCAA Division I men's basketball players with 2000 points and 1000 rebounds
