= 2001 MAC men's basketball tournament =

- Classification: Division I
- Season: 2000–01
- Teams: 13
- Site: Gund Arena; Cleveland, Ohio
- Champions: Kent State (2nd title)
- Winning coach: Gary Waters (2nd title)
- MVP: Trevor Huffman (Kent State)
- MAC men's basketball tournaments

2000–01 Mid-American Conference men's basketball standings
| | Conf. | | | | Overall |
| Team | W | | L | PCT | W | | L | PCT |
|---|---|---|---|---|---|---|---|---|
East
| Kent State † | 13 | – | 5 | .722 | 24 | – | 10 | .706 |
| Marshall | 12 | – | 6 | .667 | 18 | – | 9 | .667 |
| Ohio | 12 | – | 6 | .667 | 19 | – | 11 | .633 |
| Bowling Green | 10 | – | 8 | .556 | 15 | – | 14 | .517 |
| Miami (OH) | 10 | – | 8 | .556 | 17 | – | 16 | .515 |
| Akron | 9 | – | 9 | .500 | 12 | – | 16 | .429 |
| Buffalo | 2 | – | 16 | .111 | 4 | – | 24 | .143 |
West
| Central Michigan | 14 | – | 4 | .778 | 20 | – | 8 | .714 |
| Toledo | 12 | – | 6 | .667 | 22 | – | 11 | .667 |
| Ball State | 11 | – | 7 | .611 | 18 | – | 12 | .600 |
| Western Michigan | 7 | – | 11 | .389 | 7 | – | 21 | .250 |
| Northern Illinois | 4 | – | 14 | .222 | 5 | – | 23 | .179 |
| Eastern Michigan | 1 | – | 17 | .056 | 3 | – | 25 | .107 |
† 2001 MAC tournament winner Rankings from AP Poll

The 2001 MAC men's basketball tournament, a part of the 2000–01 NCAA Division I men's basketball season, took place at Gund Arena in Cleveland. Its winner received the Mid-American Conference's automatic bid to the 2001 NCAA tournament. It was a single-elimination tournament with four rounds and the three highest seeds received byes in the first round. All MAC teams were invited to participate. Central Michigan, the MAC regular season winner, received the number one seed in the tournament.

== Tournament ==
=== Seeds ===
1. Central Michigan
2. Kent State
3. Marshall
4. Toledo
5. Ohio
6. Ball State
7. Bowling Green
8. Miami
9. Akron
10. Western Michigan
11. Northern Illinois
12. Buffalo
13. Eastern Michigan

=== Bracket ===
First round
8 | Miami (OH) | 69
9 | Akron | 56
4 | Toledo | 67
13 | Eastern Michigan | 43
5 | Ohio | 101
12 | Buffalo | 78
7 | Bowling Green | 74
10 | Western Michigan | 68
6 | Ball State | 89
11 | Northern Illinois | 57

Quarterfinals
1 | Central Michigan | 56
8 | Miami (OH) | 65
4 | Toledo | 63
5 | Ohio | 64
2 | Kent State | 71
7 | Bowling Green | 50
3 | Marshall | 81
6 | Ball State | 84

Semifinals
8 | Miami (OH) | 62
5 | Ohio | 61
2 | Kent State | 67
6 | Ball State | 55

Championship
8 | Miami (OH) | 61
2 | Kent State | 67
