= 2000–01 Kent State Golden Flashes men's basketball team =

American college basketball season

2000–01 Kent State Golden Flashes men's basketball

MAC tournament champions MAC East Division Champions

NCAA tournament, second round
- Conference: Mid-American Conference
- East
- Record: 24–10 (13–5 MAC)
- Head coach: Gary Waters (5th season)
- Home arena: Memorial Athletic and Convocation Center

2000–01 Mid-American Conference men's basketball standings
| | Conf. | | | | Overall |
| Team | W | | L | PCT | W | | L | PCT |
|---|---|---|---|---|---|---|---|---|
East
| Kent State † | 13 | – | 5 | .722 | 24 | – | 10 | .706 |
| Marshall | 12 | – | 6 | .667 | 18 | – | 9 | .667 |
| Ohio | 12 | – | 6 | .667 | 19 | – | 11 | .633 |
| Bowling Green | 10 | – | 8 | .556 | 15 | – | 14 | .517 |
| Miami (OH) | 10 | – | 8 | .556 | 17 | – | 16 | .515 |
| Akron | 9 | – | 9 | .500 | 12 | – | 16 | .429 |
| Buffalo | 2 | – | 16 | .111 | 4 | – | 24 | .143 |
West
| Central Michigan | 14 | – | 4 | .778 | 20 | – | 8 | .714 |
| Toledo | 12 | – | 6 | .667 | 22 | – | 11 | .667 |
| Ball State | 11 | – | 7 | .611 | 18 | – | 12 | .600 |
| Western Michigan | 7 | – | 11 | .389 | 7 | – | 21 | .250 |
| Northern Illinois | 4 | – | 14 | .222 | 5 | – | 23 | .179 |
| Eastern Michigan | 1 | – | 17 | .056 | 3 | – | 25 | .107 |
† 2001 MAC tournament winner Rankings from AP Poll

The 2000–01 Kent State Golden Flashes men's basketball team represented Kent State University as a member of the Mid-American Conference during the 2000–01 NCAA Division I men's basketball season. Led by fifth-year head coach Gary Waters, the Flashes reached the NCAA tournament for the second time in three seasons. After finishing atop the MAC East division in the regular season standings, Kent State won the MAC tournament to receive the conference's automatic bid to the NCAA tournament. Playing as the No. 13 seed in the West region, Kent State upset No. 4 seed Indiana in the opening round before losing to No. 5 seed Cincinnati in the round of 32. The team finished the season with a record of 24–10 (13–5 MAC).

== Roster ==
2000–01 Kent State Golden Flashes men's basketball team
Players
Coaches

| Pos. | # | Name | Height | Weight | Year | Hometown |
|---|---|---|---|---|---|---|
| G | 10 | Demetric Shaw | 6 ft 3 in (1.91 m) | 195 lb (88 kg) | Jr | Fort Worth, Texas |
| G | 12 | Andrew Mitchell | 5 ft 11 in (1.8 m) | 160 lb (73 kg) | Jr | Detroit, Michigan |
| G | 22 | Eric Haut | 6 ft 0 in (1.83 m) | 195 lb (88 kg) | Fr | Lansing, Michigan |
| G | 24 | Trevor Huffman | 6 ft 1 in (1.85 m) | 190 lb (86 kg) | Jr | Petoskey, Michigan |
| F | | Kyrem Massey | 6 ft 5 in (1.96 m) | 195 lb (88 kg) | Sr | Columbus, OH |
| G | 32 | Brian Howard | 6 ft 5 in (1.96 m) | 210 lb (95 kg) | Fr | Troy, Michigan |
| G | 32 | Anthony Wilkins | 6 ft 7 in (2.01 m) | 215 lb (98 kg) | So | Cleveland, Ohio |
| F | 34 | Bryan Bedford | 6 ft 4 in (1.93 m) | 230 lb (104 kg) | Fr | Racine, Wisconsin |
| F | 40 | Eric Thomas | 6 ft 4 in (1.93 m) | 205 lb (93 kg) | Jr | Springfield, Ohio |
| C | 54 | John Edwards | 7 ft 0 in (2.13 m) | 275 lb (125 kg) | Fr | Hudson, Ohio |

Head coach

Gary Waters

Assistant coach(es)

Legend

- (C) Team captain
- (S) Suspended
- (I) Ineligible
- (W) Walk-on
- Injured
- Current redshirt

== Schedule and results ==
| Date time, TV | Rank^{#} | Opponent^{#} | Result | Record | Site (attendance) city, state |
Non-conference Regular season
| Nov 25, 2000* | | at Arizona State | L 61–76 | 1–1 | ASU Activity Center; Tempe, Arizona |
| Dec 20, 2000* | | vs. Northwestern | W 67–58 | 6–2 | Mario Morales Coliseum; Guaynabo, Puerto Rico |
| Dec 21, 2000* | | vs. Nebraska | L 68–69 | 6–3 | Mario Morales Coliseum; Guaynabo, Puerto Rico |
| Dec 22, 2000* | | vs. VCU | W 81–75 | 7–3 | Mario Morales Coliseum; Guaynabo, Puerto Rico |
| Dec 30, 2000* | | at Xavier | L 60–71 | 7–4 | Cintas Center; Cincinnati, Ohio |
MAC Regular season
| Jan 3, 2001 | | Eastern Michigan | W 70–57 | 8–4 (1–0) | Memorial Athletic and Convocation Center; Kent, Ohio |
| Mar 3, 2001 | | at Akron | L 68–76 | 20–9 (13–5) | James A. Rhodes Arena; Akron, Ohio |
MAC Tournament
| Mar 8, 2001* | | vs. Bowling Green State; Quarterfinals | W 71–64 | 21–9 | Gund Arena; Cleveland, Ohio |
| Mar 9, 2001* | | vs. Ball State; Semifinals | W 67–55 | 22–9 | Gund Arena; Cleveland, Ohio |
| Mar 10, 2001* | | vs. Miami (OH); Championship game | W 67–61 | 23–9 | Gund Arena; Cleveland, Ohio |
NCAA Tournament
| Mar 15, 2001* | (13 W) | vs. (4 W) No. 20 Indiana; First Round | W 77–73 | 24–9 | Cox Arena (9,697); San Diego, California |
| Mar 17, 2001* | (13 W) | vs. (5 W) Cincinnati; Second Round | L 43–66 | 24–10 | Cox Arena; San Diego, California |
*Non-conference game. ^{#}Rankings from AP poll. (#) Tournament seedings in parentheses. S=South. All times are in Eastern.
