= Brad Robinson (basketball) =

American basketball player

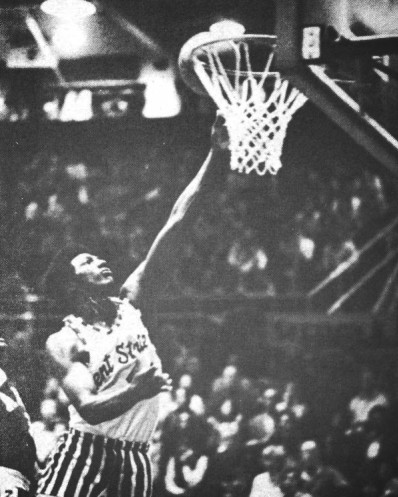
- Robinson, circa 1974

Personal information
- Born: c. 1955
- Listed height: 6 ft 7 in (2.01 m)
- Listed weight: 215 lb (98 kg)

Career information
- High school: Central-Hower (Akron, Ohio)
- College: Kent State (1973–1976)
- NBA draft: 1976: undrafted
- Position: Forward

Career highlights
- 2× honorable mention All-MAC (1974, 1975)

Bradley Robinson (March 22, 1953 – October 15, 2023) was a retired American basketball player. He was known for his collegiate career at Kent State University between 1973–74 and 1975–76. A forward, Robinson once recorded 30 rebounds in a single game, which is one of the top 10 performances in the post-1973 college basketball era.

A native of Akron, Ohio, Robinson played at Central-Hower High School in 1970–71 and 1971–72 (the high school opened in 1970). He was named a Second Team All-State player for Class AAA as a senior. Standing 6 ft 7 in (2.01 m) and weighing 215 pounds, Robinson played the forward position. He graduated from Central-Hower in 1972 and then embarked on a three-year collegiate career at Kent State University (freshmen were ineligible to play varsity sports back then due to NCAA rules). His best season came in 1973–74, his sophomore year, in which he led the Mid-American Conference (MAC) in rebounding (16.2 per game), but also set a Kent State record for rebounds in a single season (423). On February 9, 1974, he grabbed 30 rebounds against Central Michigan, good for a tie of the 10th-best single game total in college basketball's post-1973 era. As of the 2013–14 season, Robinson's 768 career rebounds are third all-time in Kent State history. Robinson never played professionally after graduating in 1976.

== See also ==
- List of NCAA Division I men's basketball players with 30 or more rebounds in a game
