= 1998–99 Kent State Golden Flashes men's basketball team =

American college basketball season

1998–99 Kent State Golden Flashes men's basketball

MAC tournament champions

NCAA tournament, First Round
- Conference: Mid-American Conference
- South
- Record: 23–7 (13–5 MAC)
- Head coach: Gary Waters
- Home arena: Memorial Athletic and Convocation Center

1998–99 Mid-American Conference men's basketball standings
| | Conf. | | | | Overall |
| Team | W | | L | PCT | W | | L | PCT |
|---|---|---|---|---|---|---|---|---|
East
| Miami | 15 | – | 3 | .833 | 24 | – | 8 | .750 |
| Kent State † | 13 | – | 5 | .722 | 23 | – | 7 | .767 |
| Akron | 12 | – | 6 | .667 | 18 | – | 9 | .667 |
| Ohio | 12 | – | 6 | .667 | 18 | – | 10 | .643 |
| Bowling Green | 12 | – | 6 | .667 | 18 | – | 10 | .643 |
| Marshall | 11 | – | 7 | .611 | 16 | – | 11 | .593 |
| Buffalo | 1 | – | 17 | .056 | 5 | – | 24 | .172 |
West
| Toledo | 11 | – | 7 | .611 | 19 | – | 9 | .679 |
| Ball State | 10 | – | 8 | .556 | 16 | – | 11 | .593 |
| Central Michigan | 7 | – | 11 | .389 | 10 | – | 16 | .385 |
| Western Michigan | 6 | – | 12 | .333 | 11 | – | 15 | .423 |
| Eastern Michigan | 5 | – | 13 | .278 | 5 | – | 20 | .200 |
| Northern Illinois | 2 | – | 16 | .111 | 6 | – | 20 | .231 |
† 1999 MAC tournament winner Rankings from AP Poll

The 1998–99 Kent State Golden Flashes men's basketball team represented Kent State University as a member of the Mid-American Conference during the 1998–99 NCAA Division I men's basketball season. Led by head coach Gary Waters, the Flashes played their home games at the Memorial Athletic and Convocation Center in Kent, Ohio. After finishing second in the MAC East standings, Kent State won the MAC tournament to receive the conference's automatic bid to the NCAA tournament – the first appearance in program history. Playing as the No. 11 seed in the East region, the team was beaten by No. 6 seed Temple in the opening round. Kent State finished the season with a record of 23–7 (11–5 MAC).

== Roster ==
1998–99 Kent State Golden Flashes men's basketball team
Players
Coaches

| Pos. | # | Name | Height | Weight | Year | Hometown |
|---|---|---|---|---|---|---|
| G | | Ed Norvell | 6 ft 2 in (1.88 m) | — | Sr |
| G | 12 | Andrew Mitchell | 5 ft 11 in (1.8 m) | 160 lb (73 kg) | Fr | Detroit, Michigan |
| G | 24 | Trevor Huffman | 6 ft 1 in (1.85 m) | 190 lb (86 kg) | Fr | Petoskey, Michigan |
| F | | Kyrem Massey | 6 ft 5 in (1.96 m) | 195 lb (88 kg) | So | Columbus, OH |
| F | 40 | Eric Thomas | 6 ft 4 in (1.93 m) | 205 lb (93 kg) | So | Springfield, Ohio |
| C | | John Whorton | 6 ft 8 in (2.03 m) | — | Jr |

Head coach

Gary Waters

Assistant coach(es)

Legend

- (C) Team captain
- (S) Suspended
- (I) Ineligible
- (W) Walk-on
- Injured
- Current redshirt

Roster

== Schedule and results ==
| Date time, TV | Rank^{#} | Opponent^{#} | Result | Record | Site (attendance) city, state |
Non-conference Regular season
| Nov 14, 1998* | | at Dayton | L 73–89 | 0–1 | University of Dayton Arena; Dayton, Ohio |
| Nov 18, 1998* | | Youngstown State | W 67–56 | 1–1 | Memorial Athletic and Convocation Center; Kent, Ohio |
MAC Regular season
| Feb 24, 1999 | | at Miami (OH) | L 60–73 | 20–6 (13–5) | Millett Hall; Oxford, Ohio |
MAC Tournament
| Feb 27, 1999* | | Marshall; Quarterfinals | W 79–76 | 21–6 | Memorial Athletic and Convocation Center; Kent, Ohio |
| Mar 2, 1999* | | vs. Ohio; Semifinals | W 68–57 | 22–6 | SeaGate Convention Centre; Toledo, Ohio |
| Mar 3, 1999* | | vs. Miami (OH); Championship game | W 49–43 | 23–6 | SeaGate Convention Centre; Toledo, Ohio |
NCAA Tournament
| Mar 12, 1999* | (11 E) | vs. (6 E) Temple; First round | L 54–61 | 23–7 | FleetCenter; Boston, Massachusetts |
*Non-conference game. ^{#}Rankings from AP poll. (#) Tournament seedings in parentheses. S=South. All times are in Eastern.
