= Dragan Dojčin =

Serbian basketball player (born 1976)

Personal information
- Born: 22 January 1976 (age 50) Zemun, SR Serbia, SFR Yugoslavia
- Listed height: 2.04 m (6 ft 8 in)
- Listed weight: 102 kg (225 lb)

Career information
- Playing career: 2000–2013
- Position: Power forward

Career history
- 2000–2002: Zdravlje
- 2002–2004: Pivovarna Laško
- 2004–2005: Atlas
- 2005–2006: Khimik
- 2006–2007: Panionios
- 2007–2010: Alba Berlin
- 2010–2013: TBB Trier

Dragan Dojčin (born 22 January 1976) is a Serbian former professional basketball player.
