= Yuval Naimy =

Israeli basketball player (born 1985)

Yuval Naimy יובל נעימי
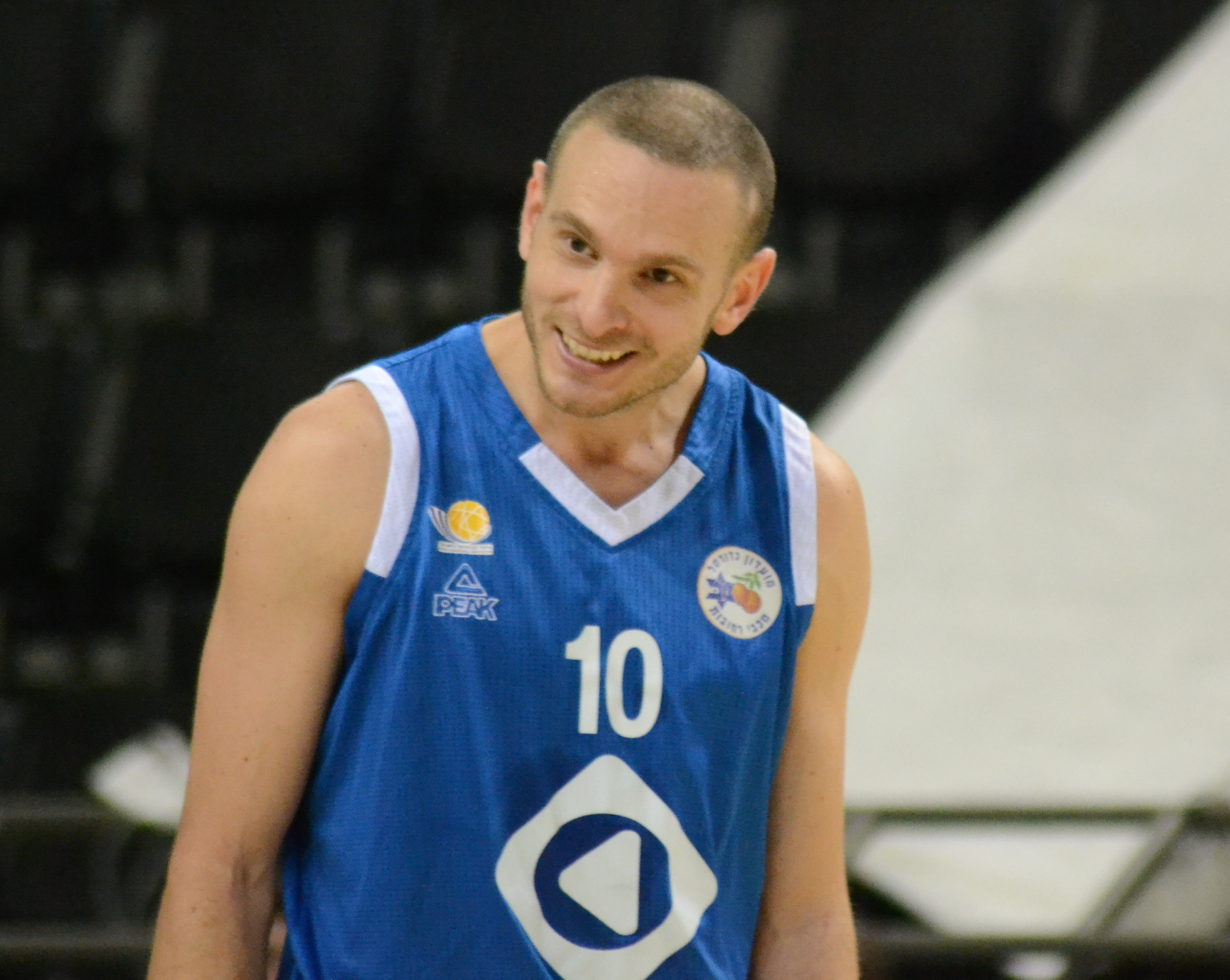
- Naimy with Maccabi Rehovot in 2019

Personal information
- Born: August 31, 1985 (age 41) Jerusalem
- Listed height: 1.88 m (6 ft 2 in)
- Listed weight: 83 kg (183 lb)

Career information
- NBA draft: 2007: undrafted
- Playing career: 2003–2020
- Position: Point guard
- Number: 11

Career history
- 2003–2004: Hapoel Jerusalem
- 2004–2005: Maccabi Rosh HaAyin
- 2005–2007: Maccabi Givat Shmuel
- 2007–2008: Ironi Ashkelon
- 2008–2012: Hapoel Jerusalem
- 2012–2013: Triumph Lyubertsy
- 2013: Maccabi Tel Aviv
- 2013–2014: Hapoel Eilat
- 2014–2015: Bnei Herzliya
- 2015–2016: Ironi Nes Ziona
- 2016–2017: Scafati Basket
- 2017–2018: Unieuro Forlì
- 2018–2019: Maccabi Rehovot
- 2020: Elitzur Eito Ashkelon

Career highlights
- EuroCup champion (2004); Israeli League Rising Star (2006); Israeli Super League Sixth Man of the Year (2011)

Yuval Naimy (Hebrew: יובל נעימי; born August 31, 1985) is an Israeli former professional basketball player. He played at the point guard position, standing at 1.88 m (6 ft 2 in).

== Early life ==
Naimy was born in Jerusalem. He played for Hapoel Jerusalem youth team.

== Professional career ==
Naimy started his professional career with Hapoel Jerusalem, with whom he won the ULEB Cup (now called EuroCup) championship in the 2003–04 season. In the 2005–06 season, he played with Maccabi Rosh HaAiyn of the Israeli 2nd Division Liga Leumit. Between 2005 and 2007, Naimy played with Maccabi Givat Shmuel. During the 2007–08 season, he played with Ironi Ashkelon, for which he averaged 14.4 points per game, in 27 games played.

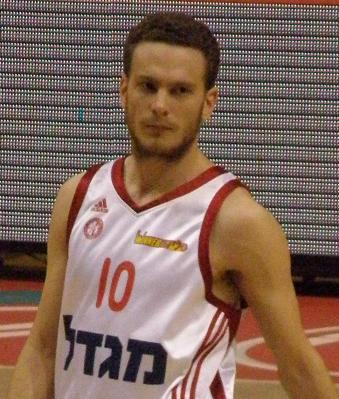
Naimy with Hapoel Jerusalem in May 2010

In 2008, he returned to Hapoel Jerusalem The newspaper Haaretz described him as "one of the most talented players Jerusalem has seen in years". In the 2008–09 and 2009–10 seasons, he led Hapoel Jerusalem to win the Winner Cup, and to reach Israeli Super League Final Four.

On June 10, 2012, Naimy signed a one-year contract with the Russian team Triumph Lyubertsy. On October 14, 2012, Naimy recorded a season-high 27 points, shooting 7-of-12 from 3-point range, along with three rebounds and six assists in an 80–76 overtime win over Žalgiris.

On August 6, 2013, Naimy signed a three-year contract with the Israeli team Maccabi Tel Aviv. However, on December 10, 2013, Naimy parted ways with Maccabi and joined Hapoel Eilat for the rest of the season.

On July 22, 2014, Naimy signed with Bnei Herzliya for the 2014–15 season.

On July 15, 2015, Naimy signed a one-year deal with Ironi Nes Ziona. On February 1, 2016, Naimy recorded a career-high 35 points, shooting 12-of-23 from the field, along with four rebounds and five assists in an 86–91 loss to Maccabi Ashdod.

On September 22, 2016, Naimy signed a one-year deal with the Italian team Scafati Basket of the Serie A2 Basket. In 24 games played for Scafati, Naimy finished the season as the Serie A2 leading player in assists with 7.5 per game, he also averaged 15.6 points, 3 rebounds and 1.1 steals per game.

On July 20, 2017, Naimy signed with Unieuro Forlì for the 2017–18 season. On March 11, 2018, Naimy recorded a season-high 28 points, shooting 8-of-12 from 3-point range, along with four rebounds, six assists and two steals in a 96–82 win over Gagà Milano Orzibasket.

On August 9, 2018, Naimy signed a three-year deal with Maccabi Rehovot of the Israeli National League.

On February 5, 2020, Naimy signed with Elitzur Eito Ashkelon for the rest of the season.

== Israeli national team ==
Naimy was a member of the senior Israeli national basketball team. He participated at the 2009 and the 2011 EuroBasket tournaments.

== Personal life ==
Naimy is the brother-in-law of Danny Klein, Hapoel Jerusalem former chairman.

== Career statistics ==
Legend
GP	Games played	GS	Games started	MPG	Minutes per game
FG%	Field goal percentage	3P%	3-point field goal percentage	FT%	Free throw percentage
RPG	Rebounds per game	APG	Assists per game	SPG	Steals per game
BPG	Blocks per game	PPG	Points per game	**Bold**	Career high

=== EuroCup ===
Year	Team	GP	GS	MPG	FG%	3P%	FT%	RPG	APG	SPG	BPG	PPG	PIR
2009–10	(Israel) Hapoel Jerusalem	**14**	**12**	27.6	**.471**	.388	.828	1.1	**4.2**	1.2	.0	**11.2**	**11.4**
2010–11	(Israel) Hapoel Jerusalem	5	0	13.0	.333	.250	.400	1.4	1.6	.6	.0	3.6	2.6
2011–12	(Israel) Hapoel Jerusalem	4	4	**28.2**	.348	.056	**1.000**	**1.7**	4.0	**1.7**	.0	**11.2**	9.0
2012–13	(Russia) Triumph Lyubertsy	12	6	22.0	.440	**.472**	.667	1.5	2.0	.3	.0	10.0	6.1
