= 2012–13 Euroleague Regular Season Group B =

2012–13 Euroleague

Standings and Results for Group B of the Regular Season phase of the 2012–13 Euroleague basketball tournament.

== Standings ==
Pos	Team	Pld	W	L	PF	PA	PD	Qualification
1	(Israel) Maccabi Tel Aviv	10	8	2	810	708	+102	Advance to Top 16
2	(Spain) Unicaja	10	8	2	762	715	+47	Advance to Top 16
3	(Italy) Montepaschi Siena	10	5	5	879	844	+35	Advance to Top 16
4	(Germany) Alba Berlin	10	4	6	722	748	−26	Advance to Top 16
5	(France) Élan Chalon	10	3	7	782	843	−61	
6	(Poland) Asseco Prokom Gdynia	10	2	8	704	801	−97	

Source: Euroleague

== Fixtures and results ==
All times given below are in Central European Time.

=== Game 1 ===
11 October 2012
20:00

Report

Élan Chalon (France)	81–74	(Poland) Asseco Prokom
Scoring by quarter: 11–12, 22–16, 24–20, 24–26
Pts: Rush, Evtimov 17; Rebs: Williams 9 Asts: Tchicamboud 8		Pts: Koszarek 14; Rebs: Koszarek 7 Asts: Blassingame 11

Le Colisée, Chalon-sur-Saône
Attendance: 4,000
Referees: José Martín (ESP), Andrej Jersan (SLO), Jurgis Laurinavicius (LTU)

11 October 2012
20:45

Report

Unicaja (Spain)	80–85	(Israel) Maccabi Tel Aviv
Scoring by quarter: 20–25, 16–22, 27–18, 17–20
Pts: Calloway 25; Rebs: Williams, Lima 5 Asts: Calloway 2		Pts: Hickman 16; Rebs: Thomas 8 Asts: Hickman 4

Palacio de Deportes José María Martín Carpena, Málaga
Attendance: 5,900
Referees: Grzegorz Ziemblicki (POL), Milija Vojinovic (SRB), Joseph Bissang (FRA)

12 October 2012
20:45

Report

Montepaschi Siena (Italy)	82–92	(Germany) Alba Berlin
Scoring by quarter: 25–25, 14–17, 20–27, 23–23
Pts: Moss 17; Rebs: Kasun 7 Asts: Moss 3		Pts: Wood 15; Rebs: Morley 6 Asts: Morley 6

Palaestra, Siena
Attendance: 3,112
Referees: Juan Carlos Garcia Gonzalez (ESP), Robert Vyklicky (CZE), Marko Juras (SRB)

=== Game 2 ===
17 October 2012
19:45

Report

Asseco Prokom (Poland)	75–77	(Spain) Unicaja
Scoring by quarter: 22–28, 17–17, 20–18, 16–14
Pts: Koszarek 16; Rebs: Hrycaniuk 7 Asts: Koszarek 8		Pts: Williams 18; Rebs: Simon 6 Asts: Williams 4

Ergo Arena, Gdańsk
Attendance: 1,950
Referees: Recep Ankarali (TUR), Carmelo Paternico (ITA), Rustu Nuran (TUR)

18 October 2012
20:45

Report

Alba Berlin (Germany)	74–71	(France) Élan Chalon
Scoring by quarter: 24–25, 12–15, 15–19, 23–12
Pts: Thompson 24; Rebs: Thompson 8 Asts: Avdalović, Schaffartzik 5		Pts: Tchicamboud 20; Rebs: Williams 13; Asts: Schilb 4

O2 World, Berlin
Attendance: 8,146
Referees: Emilio Perez Pizarro (ESP), Renaud Geller (BEL), Sergiy Chebyshev (UKR)

18 October 2012
21:05

Report

Maccabi Tel Aviv (Israel)	70–68	(Italy) Montepaschi Siena
Scoring by quarter: 14–20, 17–13, 22–19, 17–16
Pts: Hickman 19; Rebs: Eliyahu, Thomas 11; Asts: Hickman 3		Pts: Kemp 16; Rebs: Sanikidze 12; Asts: Brown 6

Nokia Arena, Tel Aviv
Attendance: 10,728
Referees: Christos Christodoulou (GRE), Borys Ryzhyk (UKR), Tomas Trawicki (POL)

=== Game 3 ===
25 October 2012
20:45

Report

Élan Chalon (France)	61–90	(Israel) Maccabi Tel Aviv
Scoring by quarter: 15–26, 13–27, 21–24, 12–13
Pts: Rush, Williams 12; Rebs: Adolphe 9 Asts: Tchicamboud 4		Pts: Logan 17; Rebs: Ohayon 7 Asts: Ohayon 9

Le Colisée, Chalon-sur-Saône
Attendance: 5,000
Referees: Juan Carlos Arteaga (ESP), Jakub Zamajski (POL), Roberto Chiari (ITA)

25 October 2012
21:00

Report

Asseco Prokom (Poland)	77–66	(Germany) Alba Berlin
Scoring by quarter: 14–18, 18–11, 19–21, 26–16
Pts: Blassingame 16; Rebs: Robinson 7 Asts: Blassingame 10		Pts: Wood 18; Rebs: Thompson, Idbihi 4 Asts: Wood 4

Ergo Arena, Gdańsk
Attendance: 3,000
Referees: Dubravko Muhvic (CRO), Vicente Bulto (ESP), Anastasios Piloidis (GRE)

26 October 2012
21:45

Report

Unicaja (Spain)	91–89 (OT)	(Italy) Montepaschi Siena
Scoring by quarter: 20–16, 22–27, 15–25, 23–12, Overtime: 11–9
Pts: Williams, Calloway 15; Rebs: Gist 6 Asts: Williams 6		Pts: Brown 22; Rebs: Sanikidze 13; Asts: Brown 6

Palacio de Deportes José María Martín Carpena, Málaga
Attendance: 5,884
Referees: Ilija Belosevic (SRB), Fernando Rocha (POR), Nicola Maestre (FRA)

=== Game 4 ===
1 November 2012
21:05

Report

Maccabi Tel Aviv (Israel)	93–62	(Poland) Asseco Prokom
Scoring by quarter: 27–13, 23–17, 22–17, 21–15
Pts: Hickman 14; Rebs: James, Shermadini 5 Asts: Hickman 6		Pts: Blassingame 14; Rebs: Mahalbašić 7 Asts: Blassingame 9

Nokia Arena, Tel Aviv
Attendance: 10,728
Referees: Srdan Dozai (CRO), Spiros Gkontas (GRE), Marko Juras (SRB)

1 November 2012
20:45

Report

Unicaja (Spain)	67–62	(Germany) Alba Berlin
Scoring by quarter: 22–16, 7–18, 18–9, 20–19
Pts: Calloway 14; Rebs: Simon 7 Asts: Simon 4		Pts: Thompson 17; Rebs: Miralles 10; Asts: Morley 6

Palacio de Deportes José María Martín Carpena, Málaga
Attendance: 6,300
Referees: Luigi Lamonica (ITA), Olegs Latisevs (LAT), Sergio Silva (POR)

2 November 2012
20:45

Report

Montepaschi Siena (Italy)	93–90	(France) Élan Chalon
Scoring by quarter: 23–30, 27–25, 23–20, 20–15
Pts: Brown 34; Rebs: Ress 9 Asts: Brown 5		Pts: Williams 28; Rebs: Williams 13; Asts: Tchicamboud 6

Palaestra, Siena
Attendance: 3,953
Referees: Dubravko Muhvic (CRO), Luis Lopes (POR), Radomir Vojinovic (MNE)

=== Game 5 ===
8 November 2012
19:30

Report

Élan Chalon (France)	78–88	(Spain) Unicaja
Scoring by quarter: 21–24, 11–20, 29–24, 17–20
Pts: Schilb 24; Rebs: Williams 8 Asts: Tchicamboud 5		Pts: Žorić 17; Rebs: Žorić, Gist 7 Asts: Williams 7

Le Colisée, Chalon-sur-Saône
Attendance: 5,000
Referees: Guerrino Cerebuch (ITA), Srdan Dozai (CRO), Robert Vyklicky (CZE)

8 November 2012
20:45

Alba Berlin (Germany)	76–78	(Israel) Maccabi Tel Aviv
Scoring by quarter: 10–16, 25–22, 17–18, 24–22
Pts: Đedović 17; Rebs: Miralles, Đedović 7 Asts: Schaffartzik 7		Pts: Smith 20; Rebs: Thomas 6 Asts: Eliyahu 4

O2 World, Berlin
Attendance: 9,432
Referees: Ilija Belosevic (SRB), Antonio Conde (ITA), Andrej Jersan (SLO)

9 November 2012
19:45

Report

Asseco Prokom (Poland)	66–101	(Italy) Montepaschi Siena
Scoring by quarter: 22–21, 13–21, 12–37, 19–22
Pts: Acker 15; Rebs: Hrycaniuk 5 Asts: Koszarek 4		Pts: Brown 27; Rebs: Ress 7 Asts: Brown 7

Ergo Arena, Gdańsk
Attendance: 2,500
Referees: Boris Shulga (UKR), Elias Koromilas (GRE), Sergio Silva (POR)

=== Game 6 ===
15 November 2012
19:45

Report

Asseco Prokom (Poland)	70–76	(France) Élan Chalon
Scoring by quarter: 20–13, 17–21, 17–17, 16–25
Pts: Hrycaniuk 17; Rebs: Hrycaniuk 10; Asts: Koszarek 5		Pts: Rush 18; Rebs: Schilb 7 Asts: Schilb 4

Ergo Arena, Gdańsk
Attendance: 3,400
Referees: Paolo Taurino (ITA), Sinisa Herceg (CRO), Haris Bijedic (BIH)

15 November 2012
21:05

Report

Maccabi Tel Aviv (Israel)	62–64	(Spain) Unicaja
Scoring by quarter: 21–17, 16–21, 12–11, 13–15
Pts: James 14; Rebs: Smith 10; Asts: Ohayon 7		Pts: Williams 12; Rebs: Gist 7 Asts: Calloway 4

Nokia Arena, Tel Aviv
Attendance: 10,000
Referees: Carl Jungebrand (FIN), Tolga Sahin (ITA), Panagiotis Anastopoulos (GRE)

15 November 2012
20:45

Report

Alba Berlin (Germany)	73–75	(Italy) Montepaschi Siena
Scoring by quarter: 17–21, 17–18, 18–21, 21–15
Pts: Thompson 20; Rebs: Đedović 10; Asts: Avdalovic, Schaffartzik 4		Pts: Brown 21; Rebs: Hackett 5 Asts: Brown 6

O2 World, Berlin
Attendance: 8,278
Referees: Grzegorz Ziemblicki (POL), Petar Obradovic (BIH), Rustu Nuran (TUR)

=== Game 7 ===
22 November 2012
20:00

Report

Élan Chalon (France)	82–87	(Germany) Alba Berlin
Scoring by quarter: 20–15, 13–20, 20–18, 29–34
Pts: Schilb, Rush 21; Rebs: Rush 6 Asts: Schilb 7		Pts: Idbihi 16; Rebs: Morley 9 Asts: Avdalovic 6

Le Colisée, Chalon-sur-Saône
Attendance: 4,900
Referees: Tolga Sahin (ITA), Boris Shulga (UKR), Gianluca Mattioli (ITA)

22 November 2012
20:45

Report

Unicaja (Spain)	63–48	(Poland) Asseco Prokom
Scoring by quarter: 13–13, 21–10, 13–8, 16–17
Pts: Perović 12; Rebs: Dragić 6 Asts: Williams 4		Pts: Hrycaniuk 10; Rebs: Mahalbašić 8 Asts: Blassingame, Koszarek 3

Palacio de Deportes José María Martín Carpena, Málaga
Attendance: 6,300
Referees: Sasa Pukl (SLO), Petri Mantyla (FIN), Zdravko Rutesic (MNE)

23 November 2012
20:45

Report

Montepaschi Siena (Italy)	89–87	(Israel) Maccabi Tel Aviv
Scoring by quarter: 21–23, 23–18, 15–24, 30–22
Pts: Brown 16; Rebs: Moss 9 Asts: Brown 6		Pts: James 22; Rebs: James 12; Asts: Ohayon 5

Palaestra, Siena
Attendance: 4,722
Referees: Milivoje Jovcic (SRB), Olegs Latisevs (LAT), Damir Javor (SLO)

=== Game 8 ===
29 November 2012
19:00

Report

Alba Berlin (Germany)	67–64	(Poland) Asseco Prokom
Scoring by quarter: 15–13, 21–15, 16–13, 15–23
Pts: Wood 14; Rebs: Morley 6 Asts: Wood 5		Pts: Mahalbašić 12; Rebs: Mahalbašić 10; Asts: Koszarek 5

O_{2} World, Berlin
Attendance: 8,220
Referees: Sreten Radovic (CRO), Seffi Shemmesh (ISR), Sergiy Zashchuk (UKR)

29 November 2012
20:05

Report

Maccabi Tel Aviv (Israel)	78–73	(France) Élan Chalon
Scoring by quarter: 24–26, 14–17, 20–17, 20–13
Pts: Smith 19; Rebs: James 9 Asts: Eliyahu 7		Pts: Rush 17; Rebs: Williams 12; Asts: Schilb 5

Nokia Arena, Tel Aviv
Attendance: 10,728
Referees: Emin Mogulkoc (TUR), Petar Obradovic (BIH), Igor Dragojevic (MNE)

30 November 2012
20:00

Report

Montepaschi Siena (Italy)	91–72	(Spain) Unicaja
Scoring by quarter: 30–20, 26–20, 18–19, 17–13
Pts: Moss 13; Rebs: Kangur, Sanikidze 6 Asts: Hackett 7		Pts: Žorić 29; Rebs: Gist 6 Asts: Simon 6

Palaestra, Siena
Attendance: 4,596
Referees: Robert Lottermoser (GER), Spiros Gkontas (GRE), Marcin Kowalski (POL)

=== Game 9 ===
6 December 2012
19:45

Report

Asseco Prokom (Poland)	73–89	(Israel) Maccabi Tel Aviv
Scoring by quarter: 19–15, 23–20, 23–25, 8–29
Pts: Mahalbašić 14; Rebs: Mahalbašić 6 Asts: Blassingame 7		Pts: Hickman 20; Rebs: Ohayon 4 Asts: Smith 8

Ergo Arena, Gdańsk
Attendance: 4,700
Referees: Luigi Lamonica (ITA), Francisco Araña (ESP), Jurgis Laurinavicius (LTU)

6 December 2012
20:00

Report

Alba Berlin (Germany)	63–74	(Spain) Unicaja
Scoring by quarter: 18–14, 17–22, 16–23, 12–15
Pts: Schultze 12; Rebs: Idbihi 12; Asts: Đedović 4		Pts: Williams 16; Rebs: Žorić 5 Asts: Williams 5

O2 World, Berlin
Attendance: 7,816
Referees: Matej Boltauzer (SLO), Olegs Latisevs (LAT), Haris Bijedic (BIH)

7 December 2012
21:00

Report

Élan Chalon (France)	108–103 (OT)	(Italy) Montepaschi Siena
Scoring by quarter: 27–24, 22–24, 21–27, 23–18, Overtime: 15–10
Pts: Schilb 28; Rebs: Schilb, Williams 7 Asts: Houston 7		Pts: Brown 26; Rebs: Sanikidze 5 Asts: Brown 10

Le Colisée, Chalon-sur-Saône
Attendance: 4,400
Referees: Recep Ankarali (TUR), Sreten Radovic (CRO), Oscar Perea (ESP)

=== Game 10 ===
13 December 2012
20:00

Report

Unicaja (Spain)	86–62	(France) Élan Chalon
Scoring by quarter: 24–11, 22–12, 21–20, 19–19
Pts: Gist 11; Rebs: Lima, Perović 7 Asts: Williams 9		Pts: Banks 13; Rebs: Capela 12; Asts: Houston 5

Palacio de Deportes José María Martín Carpena, Málaga
Attendance: 3,500
Referees: Milivoje Jovcic (SRB), Panagiotis Anastopoulos (GRE), Jurgis Laurinavičius (LTU)

13 December 2012
20:00

Report

Montepaschi Siena (Italy)	88–95 (OT)	(Poland) Asseco Prokom
Scoring by quarter: 26–13, 25–15, 12–24, 13–24, Overtime: 12–19
Pts: Brown 23; Rebs: Eze 7 Asts: Brown 6		Pts: Blassingame 26; Rebs: Mahalbašić 16; Asts: Blassingame 4

Palaestra, Siena
Attendance: 4,368
Referees: Emilio Perez Pizarro (ESP), Renaud Geller (BEL), Ersan Kartal (TUR)

13 December 2012
20:00

Report

Maccabi Tel Aviv (Israel)	78–62	(Germany) Alba Berlin
Scoring by quarter: 23–13, 25–11, 12–25, 18–13
Pts: Hickman 17; Rebs: James 10; Asts: Hickman 5		Pts: Thompson 16; Rebs: Thompson 10; Asts: Schaffartzik 5

Nokia Arena, Tel Aviv
Attendance: 10,728
Referees: Antonio Conde (ESP), Sergiy Chebyshev (UKR), Saso Petek (SLO)
