= 2012 FIBA EuroChallenge Final Four =

Tournament details
- Arena: Főnix Hall; Debrecen, Hungary
- Dates: 27–29 April 2012

Final positions
- Champions: (Turkey) Beşiktaş Milangaz
- Runners-up: (France) Élan Chalon
- Third place: (Russia) Triumph Lyubertsy
- Fourth place: (Hungary) Szolnoki Olaj

Awards and statistics
- MVP: (United Kingdom) Pops Mensah-Bonsu

The 2012 FIBA EuroChallenge Final Four was the concluding tournament of the 2012–13 FIBA EuroChallenge season. The Final Four was held in the Főnix Hall at Debrecen, Hungary.

== Bracket ==
Semifinals
27 April
(Hungary) Szolnoki Olaj	60
(Turkey) Beşiktaş Milangaz	64
27 April
(France) Élan Chalon	84
(Russia) Triumph Lyubertsy	69

Final
29 April
(Turkey) Beşiktaş Milangaz	91
(France) Élan Chalon	86
Third place game
29 April
(Hungary) Szolnoki Olaj	87
(Russia) Triumph Lyubertsy	94

== Semifinals ==
27 April 2012
18:00

Report

Szolnoki Olaj KK (Hungary)	60–64	(Turkey) Beşiktaş Milangaz
Scoring by quarter: 17–13, 13–20, 10–14, 20–17
Pts: Nikolov, 13; Rebs: Báder, 14; Asts: Trotter, 7		Pts: Erceg, 17; Rebs: Dudley, Mensah-Bonsu, 13; Asts: Arroyo, 5

Főnix Hall, Debrecen
Attendance: 3,500
Referees: Miguel Perez Perez (ESP), Fernando Rocha (POR), Tomasz Trawicki (POL)

27 April 2012
20:30

Report

Élan Chalon (France)	84–69	(Russia) BC Triumph Lyubertsy
Scoring by quarter: 20–17, 29–16, 15–19, 20–17
Pts: Schilb, 29; Rebs: Aminu, 10; Asts: Tchicamboud, 7		Pts: Jefferson, 26; Rebs: Jefferson, Landry, 9 Asts: McKee, 6

Főnix Hall, Debrecen
Attendance: 1,700
Referees: Damir Javor (SLO), Igor Dragojevic (MNE), Aare Halliko (EST)

== Third place game ==
29 April 2012
18:00

Report

Szolnoki Olaj KK (Hungary)	87–94	(Russia) BC Triumph Lyubertsy
Scoring by quarter: 27–21, 19-28, 20–12, 21-33
Pts: Trotter, 33; Rebs: Mills, 12; Asts: Horváth, Nikolov, Mills, 5		Pts: Jefferson, 37; Rebs: Jefferson, 10; Asts: McKee, 9

Főnix Hall, Debrecen
Attendance: 3,400
Referees: Miguel Perez Perez (ESP), Tomasz Trawicki (POL), Tomislav Vovk (CRO)

== Final ==
29 April 2012
20:30

Report

Beşiktaş Milangaz (Turkey)	91–86	(France) Élan Chalon
Scoring by quarter: 27–15, 17–25, 13–15, 34–31
Pts: Mensah-Bonsu, 26; Rebs: Mensah-Bonsu, 20; Asts: Arroyo, 8		Pts: Tchicamboud, 19; Rebs: Aminu, Evtimov, Lauvergne, 8 Asts: Tchicamboud, 7

Főnix Hall, Debrecen
Attendance: 3,500
Referees: Fernando Rocha (POR), Damir Javor (SLO), Igor Dragojevic (MNE)
