= 2013–14 Euroleague Regular Season Group C =

Standings and Results for Group C of the Regular Season phase of the 2013–14 Euroleague basketball tournament.

== Standings ==
Key to colors
Top four places advance to Top 16
Bottom two teams enter 2013–14 Eurocup Basketball Last 32 round

Pos	Team	Pld	W	L	PF	PA	PD	Tie
1	(Greece) Olympiacos	10	10	0	812	734	+78	
2	(Turkey) Galatasaray	10	6	4	700	725	−25	
3	(Spain) Unicaja	10	5	5	756	712	+44	
4	(Germany) Bayern Munich	10	4	6	818	791	+27	
5	(Italy) Montepaschi Siena	10	3	7	674	706	−32	
6	(Poland) Stelmet Zielona Góra	10	2	8	707	799	−92	

== Fixtures/results ==
All times given below are in Central European Time.

=== Game 1 ===
16 October 2013
20:30 CET

Boxscore

Montepaschi Siena (Italy)	75–84	(Turkey) Galatasaray Liv Hospital
Scoring by quarter: 16–20, 17–31, 19–12, 23–21
Pts: Hackett 26; Rebs: Nelson 8 Asts: three players 3		Pts: Arroyo 21; Rebs: Erceg 11; Asts: Arroyo 4

Nelson Mandela Forum, Florence
Attendance: 5,350
Referees: Juan Carlos Arteaga (ARG), Jakub Zamojski (POL), Sergiy Zashchuk (UKR)

18 October 2013
19:00 CET

Boxscore

Stelmet Zielona Góra (Poland)	73–94	(Germany) Bayern Munich
Scoring by quarter: 16–23, 12–25, 23–18, 22–28
Pts: Walker, Zamojski 11; Rebs: Cel, Hrycaniuk 5 Asts: Koszarek 7		Pts: Troutman 19; Rebs: Bryant 9 Asts: Delaney 8

CRS Hall Zielona Góra, Zielona Góra
Attendance: 4,800
Referees: Recep Ankarali (TUR), Elias Koromilas (GRE), Andrej Lovsin (SLO)

18 October 2013
20:00 CET

Boxscore

Olympiacos (Greece)	69–61	(Spain) Unicaja
Scoring by quarter: 18–22, 8–11, 18–12, 25–16
Pts: Petway, Spanoulis13; Rebs: Simmons 8 Asts: Sloukas 6		Pts: Dragić, Vázquez 12; Rebs: Vázquez 10; Asts: Suárez 4

Peace and Friendship Stadium, Piraeus
Attendance: 7,800
Referees: Borys Ryzhyk (UKR), Eddie Viator (FRA), Marko Juras (SRB)

=== Game 2 ===
24 October 2013
20:45 CET

Boxscore

Galatasaray Liv Hospital (Turkey)	67–78	(Greece) Olympiacos
Scoring by quarter: 11–22, 19–20, 27–17, 10–19
Pts: Nathan Jawai 22; Rebs: Erwin Dudley 7 Asts: Carlos Arroyo 4		Pts: Spanoulis 18; Rebs: Bryant Dunston 8 Asts: Kostas Sloukas 4

Abdi İpekçi Arena, Istanbul
Attendance: 11,400
Referees: José Martín (ESP), Robert Lottermoser (GER), Sasa Maricic (SRB)

25 October 2013
20:15 CET

Boxscore

Bayern Munich (Germany)	89–79	(Italy) Montepaschi Siena
Scoring by quarter: 22–20, 24–13, 24–19, 19–27
Pts: Delaney 20; Rebs: Bryant 11; Asts: Đedović, Schaffartzik 5		Pts: Carter 14; Rebs: Hackett, Ortner 6 Asts: Hackett 6

Audi Dome, Munich
Attendance: 5,280
Referees: Juan Carlos Garcia Gonzalez (ESP), Petar Obradovic (BIH), Aare Halliko (EST)

25 October 2013
20:45 CET

Boxscore

Unicaja (Spain)	101–68	(Poland) Stelmet Zielona Góra
Scoring by quarter: 24–19, 31–13, 25–20, 21–16
Pts: Caner-Medley 20; Rebs: Caner-Medley 10; Asts: Calloway 9		Pts: Dragičević 20; Rebs: Barlow 6 Asts: Koszarek 6

Palacio de Deportes José María Martín Carpena, Málaga
Attendance: 4,900
Referees: Paolo Taurino (ITA), Sinisa Herceg (SLO), Robert Vyklicky (CZE)

=== Game 3 ===
31 October 2013
20:00 CET

Boxscore

Olympiacos (Greece)	88–83	(Germany) Bayern Munich
Scoring by quarter: 25–20, 22–19, 19–27, 22–17
Pts: Dunston 19; Rebs: Printezis 12; Asts: Mantzaris 6		Pts: Delaney 20; Rebs: Idbihi, Savović 9 Asts: Đedović 4

Peace and Friendship Stadium, Piraeus
Attendance: 7,500
Referees: Juan Carlos Arteaga (ESP), Oscar Perea (ESP), Zdravko Rutesic (MNE)

31 October 2013
20:45 CET

Boxscore

Unicaja (Spain)	84–57	(Turkey) Galatasaray Liv Hospital
Scoring by quarter: 20–12, 21–30, 20–8, 23–7
Pts: Caner-Medley 16; Rebs: Caner-Medley, Štimac 6 Asts: Calloway, Granger 5		Pts: Gordon 12; Rebs: Mensah-Bonsu 11; Asts: Gordon 10

Palacio de Deportes José María Martín Carpena, Málaga
Attendance: 3,900
Referees: Sasa Pukl (SLO), Boris Shulga (UKR), Joseph Bissang (FRA)

1 November 2013
19:00 CET

Boxscore

Stelmet Zielona Góra (Poland)	73–65	(Italy) Montepaschi Siena
Scoring by quarter: 16–13, 19–14, 14–17, 24–21
Pts: Koszarek 15; Rebs: Eyenga 9 Asts: Koszarek 5		Pts: Carter 16; Rebs: Hackett, Hunter 7 Asts: Hackett 6

CRS Hall Zielona Góra, Zielona Góra
Attendance: 3,455
Referees: Fernando Rocha (POR), Ingus Baumanis (LAT), Benjamin Jimenez (ESP)

=== Game 4 ===
8 November 2013
19:00 CET

Boxscore

Stelmet Zielona Góra (Poland)	75–78	(Turkey) Galatasaray Liv Hospital
Scoring by quarter: 22–25, 14–18, 16–18, 23–17
Pts: Walker, Zamojski 17; Rebs: Dragičević 9 Asts: Koszarek 5		Pts: Dudley 21; Rebs: Mensah-Bonsu 9 Asts: Arroyo 6

CRS Hall Zielona Góra, Zielona Góra
Attendance: 4,500
Referees: Jose Ramon Garcia Ortiz (ESP), Tomas Jasevicius (LTU), Alexey Davydov (RUS)

8 November 2013
20:00 CET

Boxscore

Bayern Munich (Germany)	82–68	(Spain) Unicaja
Scoring by quarter: 26–15, 17–17, 24–22, 15–14
Pts: Delaney 19; Rebs: Đedović 8 Asts: Schaffartzik 3		Pts: Granger 14; Rebs: Hettsheimeir 6 Asts: Granger 3

Audi Dome, Munich
Attendance: 5,940
Referees: Luigi Lamonica (ITA), Srdan Dozai (CRO), Andrej Jersan (SLO)

8 November 2013
20:30 CET

Boxscore

Montepaschi Siena (Italy)	62–70	(Greece) Olympiacos
Scoring by quarter: 11-20, 12-16, 19-28, 20-16
Pts: English, Rochestie 13; Rebs: Hunter 6 Asts: Hackett 4		Pts: Dunston, Spanoulis, Begic, Lojeski 9 Rebs: Dunston 7 Asts: Spanoulis 5

Nelson Mandela Forum, Florence
Attendance: 6,755
Referees: Emilio Perez Pizarro (ESP), Olegs Latisevs (LAT), Luis Lopes (POR)

=== Game 5 ===
14 November 2013
20:45 CET

Boxscore

Unicaja (Spain)	73–75	(Italy) Montepaschi Siena
Scoring by quarter: 18–23, 23–16, 23–24, 9–12
Pts: Caner-Medley 18; Rebs: Vázquez, Caner-Medley 6 Asts: Suárez 7		Pts: Green 20; Rebs: Hunter 8 Asts: Hackett 7

Palacio de Deportes José María Martín Carpena, Málaga
Attendance: 5,600
Referees: Ilija Belosevic (SRB), Elias Koromilas (GRE), Nicola Maestre (FRA)

15 November 2013
18:00 CET

Boxscore

Olympiacos (Greece)	79–77	(Poland) Stelmet Zielona Góra
Scoring by quarter: 11–22, 22–20, 22–21, 24–14
Pts: Printezis 21; Rebs: Printezis 7 Asts: Spanoulis 9		Pts: Dragičević 18; Rebs: Dragičević 12; Asts: Koszarek 6

Peace and Friendship Stadium, Piraeus
Attendance: 5,500
Referees: Tolga Sahin (ITA), Carmelo Paternico (ITA), Sergio Silva (POR)

15 November 2013
19:00 CET

Boxscore

Galatasaray Liv Hospital (Turkey)	84–74	(Germany) Bayern Munich
Scoring by quarter: 29–15, 18–15, 14–19, 23–25
Pts: Mensah-Bonsu 19; Rebs: Mensah-Bonsu 13; Asts: Arroyo 6		Pts: Troutman 15; Rebs: Troutman 8 Asts: Đedović, Delaney 3

Abdi İpekçi Arena, Istanbul
Attendance: 6,594
Referees: Matej Boltauzer (SLO), Gianluca Mattioli (ITA), Ingus Baumanuis (LAT)

=== Game 6 ===
21 November 2013
19:30 CET

Boxscore

Galatasaray Liv Hospital (Turkey)	54–52	(Italy) Montepaschi Siena
Scoring by quarter: 11–11, 11–11, 18–16, 14–14
Pts: Mensah-Bonsu 16; Rebs: Mensah-Bonsu 16; Asts: Arroyo 5		Pts: Hackett 16; Rebs: Hunter 13; Asts: Hackett 4

Abdi İpekçi Arena, Istanbul
Attendance: 7,274
Referees: Christos Christodoulou (GRE), Milivoje Jovcic (SRB), Tomasz Trawicki (POL)

21 November 2013
20:00 CET

Boxscore

Bayern Munich (Germany)	71–78	(Poland) Stelmet Zielona Góra
Scoring by quarter: 16–15, 19–16, 17–32, 19–15
Pts: Đedović 17; Rebs: Bryant 9 Asts: Three players 3		Pts: Dragičević 19; Rebs: Dragičević 11; Asts: Koszarek 7

Audi Dome, Munich
Attendance: 5,889
Referees: Sasa Pukl (SLO), Seffi Shemmesh (ISR), Sasa Maricic (SRB)

22 November 2013
20:45 CET

Boxscore

Unicaja (Spain)	74–82	(Greece) Olympiacos
Scoring by quarter: 23–20, 23–21, 19–21, 9–'20
Pts: C.-Medley, Hettsheimeir 11; Rebs: three players 4 Asts: Calloway 5		Pts: Lojeski 22; Rebs: Petway 5 Asts: Mantzaris 5

Palacio de Deportes José María Martín Carpena, Málaga
Attendance: 7,100
Referees: Guerrino Cerebuch (ITA), Fernando Rocha (POR), Piotr Pastusiak (POL)

=== Game 7 ===
28 November 2013
19:00 CET

Boxscore

Stelmet Zielona Góra (Poland)	67–84	(Spain) Unicaja
Scoring by quarter: 18–26, 19–13, 12–20, 18–25
Pts: Zamojski 21; Rebs: Cel, Dragičević 6 Asts: Koszarek 9		Pts: Dragić 21; Rebs: Suárez 8 Asts: Granger 6

CRS Hall Zielona Góra, Zielona Góra
Attendance: 4,853
Referees: Milivoje Jovcic (SRB), Roberto Chiari (ITA), Milija Vojinovic (SRB)

28 November 2013
20:00 CET

Boxscore

Olympiacos (Greece)	72–54	(Turkey) Galatasaray Liv Hospital
Scoring by quarter: 18-10, 17-14, 24-11, 13-19
Pts: Dunston 18; Rebs: Lojeski 6 Asts: Spanoulis 4		Pts: Aldemir, Güler 10; Rebs: Mensah-Bonsu 8 Asts: Arslan 2

Peace and Friendship Stadium, Piraeus
Attendance: 9,500
Referees: Luigi Lamonica (ITA), Antonio Conde (ESP), Marcin Kowalski (POL)

29 November 2013
20:30 CET

Boxscore

Montepaschi Siena (Italy)	71–62	(Germany) Bayern Munich
Scoring by quarter: 21-18, 20-18, 11-10, 19-18
Pts: Hackett 15; Rebs: Ortner, Nelson 5 Asts: Hackett 10		Pts: Delaney 13; Rebs: Bryant 11; Asts: Schaffartzik 5

Nelson Mandela Forum, Florence
Attendance: 5,903
Referees: José Martín (ESP), Damir Javor (SLO), Petros Papapetrou (GRE)

=== Game 8 ===
5 December 2013
19:00 CET

Boxscore

Montepaschi Siena (Italy)	60–59	(Poland) Stelmet Zielona Góra
Scoring by quarter: 18–17, 12–13, 17–19, 13–10
Pts: Green 13; Rebs: Nelson 10; Asts: Hackett 4		Pts: Dragičević 20; Rebs: three players 6 Asts: Zamojski 5

Nelson Mandela Forum, Florence
Attendance: 4,020
Referees: Juan Carlos Garcia Gonzalez (ESP), Francisco Araña (ESP), Omer Esteron (ISR)

5 December 2013
19:30 CET

Boxscore

Galatasaray Liv Hospital (Turkey)	78–70	(Spain) Unicaja
Scoring by quarter: 19–16, 21–23, 15–14, 23–17
Pts: Arroyo 22; Rebs: Aldemir 12; Asts: Arroyo 5		Pts: Suárez 16; Rebs: Suárez 8 Asts: Calloway 4

Abdi İpekçi Arena, Istanbul
Attendance: 6,008
Referees: Grzegorz Ziemblicki (POL), Luis Lopes (POR), Panagiotis Anastopoulos (GRE)

5 December 2013
20:00 CET

Boxscore

Bayern Munich (Germany)	103–105	(Greece) Olympiacos
Scoring by quarter: 22–28, 28–31, 27–21, 26–25
Pts: Delaney 22; Rebs: Bryant 6 Asts: Delaney 6		Pts: Perperoglou 25; Rebs: Dunston 7 Asts: Sloukas 8

Audi Dome, Munich
Attendance: 6,700
Referees: Ilija Belosevic (SRB), Paolo Taurino (ITA), Sergiy Zashchuk (UKR)

=== Game 9 ===
12 December 2013
20:00 CET

Boxscore

Olympiacos (Greece)	78–73	(Italy) Montepaschi Siena
Scoring by quarter: 15–17, 10–19, 21–21, 32–16
Pts: Perperoglou 18; Rebs: Dunston 8 Asts: Sloukas 7		Pts: Green 28; Rebs: Hunter 10; Asts: three players 2

Peace and Friendship Stadium, Piraeus
Attendance: 0
Referees: Recep Ankarali (TUR), Dani Hierrenzuelo (ESP), Jakub Zamojski (POL)

12 December 2013
20:45 CET

Boxscore

Unicaja (Spain)	77–72	(Germany) Bayern Munich
Scoring by quarter: 29–20, 14–17, 13–23, 21–12
Pts: Caner-Medley 17; Rebs: Vázquez 8 Asts: Granger 8		Pts: Delaney 14; Rebs: Thompson, Troutman 8 Asts: Delaney 7

Palacio de Deportes José María Martín Carpena, Málaga
Attendance: 8,900
Referees: Christos Christodoulou (GRE), Olegs Latisevs (LAT), Rustu Nuran (TUR)

13 December 2013
19:30 CET

Boxscore

Galatasaray Liv Hospital (Turkey)	76–57	(Poland) Stelmet Zielona Góra
Scoring by quarter: 20–15, 21–15, 20–17, 15–10
Pts: Mačvan 18; Rebs: Aldemir 16; Asts: Arroyo 7		Pts: Dragičević, Koszarek 11; Rebs: Hrycaniuk 9 Asts: Koszarek 4

Abdi İpekçi Arena, Istanbul
Attendance: 3,829
Referees: Juan Carlos Arteaga (ESP), Petar Obradovic (BIH), Marko Juras (SRB)

=== Game 10 ===
19 December 2013
18:45 CET

Boxscore

Stelmet Zielona Góra (Poland)	80–91	(Greece) Olympiacos
Scoring by quarter: 18–22, 16–21, 28–29, 18–19
Pts: Zamojski 22; Rebs: Cel, Dragičević 4 Asts: Koszarek 6		Pts: Perperoglou 23; Rebs: Dunston, Simmons 5 Asts: Spanoulis 6

CRS Hall Zielona Góra, Zielona Góra
Attendance: 3,251
Referees: Tolga Sahin (ITA), Gianluca Mattioli (ITA), Saso Petek (SLO)

19 December 2013
21:00 CET

Boxscore

Montepaschi Siena (Italy)	62–64	(Spain) Unicaja
Scoring by quarter: 12–15, 10–17, 16–10, 24–22
Pts: Carter, Hunter 14; Rebs: Hunter, Viggiano 5 Asts: Hackett 6		Pts: Caner-Medley 20; Rebs: Caner-Medley, Granger 6 Asts: Calloway 4

Nelson Mandela Forum, Florence
Attendance: 5,521
Referees: Borys Ryzhyk (UKR), Sreten Radovic (CRO), Spiros Gkontas (GRE)

20 December 2013
20:00 CET

Boxscore

Bayern Munich (Germany)	88–68	(Turkey) Galatasaray Liv Hospital
Scoring by quarter: 20–10, 23–22, 22–21, 23–15
Pts: Đedović 15; Rebs: Bryant 11; Asts: Schaffartzik, Delaney 5		Pts: Domercant 15; Rebs: Aldemir 7 Asts: Guler 5

Audi Dome, Munich
Attendance: 6,700
Referees: Dani Hierrezuelo (ESP), Carmelo Paternico (ITA), Igor Dragojevic (MNE)
