= Eurocup Basketball 2011–12 qualifying round =

This page describes the qualifying round for the Eurocup Basketball 2011–12.

The qualifying round consisted of one round, played in home and away series.

== Teams ==
Country (League)	Teams	Teams (ranking in 2010-11 national championship)	
Belgium (BLB)	2	Dexia Mons-Hainaut (3)	Telenet BC Oostende (4)
France (LNB Pro A)	2	Élan Chalon (5)	Le Mans Sarthe Basket^{WC} (8)
Turkey (TBL)	2	Pınar Karşıyaka (5)	Beşiktaş JK (6)
Bulgaria (NBL)	1	Lukoil Academic (1)	
Croatia (A-1 Liga)	1	Cedevita Zagreb (2)	
Cyprus (Division 1)	1	ETHA Engomis (1)	
Czech Republic (NBL)	1	BK Prostějov (2)	
Germany (BBL)	1	Artland Dragons (4)	
Latvia (LBL)	1	BK Ventspils (2)	
Russia (PBL)	1	Spartak St. Petersburg (7)	
Spain (ACB)	1	Gran Canaria 2014 (6)	
Sweden (SBL)	1	Norrköping Dolphins^{WC} (2)	
Ukraine (SuperLeague)	1	BC Azovmash (5)	

== Matches ==
Team 1	Agg.	Team 2	1st leg	2nd leg
Azovmash (Ukraine)	153–140	(Latvia) Ventspils	74–75	79–65
Gran Canaria 2014 (Spain)	153–121	(Germany) Artland Dragons	61–56	92–65
Dexia Mons-Hainaut (Belgium)	144–141	(Turkey) Beşiktaş Milangaz	70–78	74–63
Cedevita (Croatia)	157–147	(France) Élan Chalon	73–78	84–69
Le Mans Sarthe (France)	160–151	(Turkey) Pınar Karşıyaka	80–73	80–78
Telenet Oostende (Belgium)	158–129	(Sweden) Norrköping Dolphins	88–62	70–67
Spartak Saint Petersburg (Russia)	143–123	(Cyprus) ETHA Engomis	60–59	83–64
Prostějov (Czech Republic)	142–157	(Bulgaria) Lukoil Academic	65–70	77–87

=== First leg ===
September 27, 2011
19:00 UTC+2

Report

BK Ventspils (Latvia)	75–74	(Ukraine) BC Azovmash
Scoring by quarter: 25–19, 17–20, 19–18, 14–17
Pts: Young 28; Rebs: Willard 8 Asts: Bakić 5		Pts: Minard 16; Rebs: Rancik 6 Asts: Four players 2

Arena Riga, Ventspils
Attendance: 600
Referees: Oscar Lefwerth (SWE), Chris Dodds (SCO), Martynas Gudas (LTU)

September 27, 2011
20:00 UTC+2

Report

Beşiktaş JK (Turkey)	78–70	(Belgium) Dexia Mons-Hainaut
Scoring by quarter: 22–21, 19–16, 22–15, 15–18
Pts: Kemp 24; Rebs: Dudley, Erceg 10; Asts: Williams 9		Pts: Cage 13; Rebs: Carter 8 Asts: Taylor 7

BJK Akatlar Arena, Istanbul
Referees: Miguel Anguel Perez Niz (ESP), Jasmina Juras (SRB), Sergiy Zashchuk (UKR)

September 27, 2011
20:30 UTC+2

Report

Élan Chalon (France)	78–73	(Croatia) Cedevita Zagreb
Scoring by quarter: 15–16, 29–14, 24–18, 10–25
Pts: Aminu 20; Rebs: Aminu 7 Asts: Tchicamboud 5		Pts: Owens 17; Rebs: Owens 8 Asts: Warren, Vukušić 4

Le Colisée, Chalon sur Saone
Attendance: 3,800
Referees: Boris Schmidt (GER), Alessandro Martolini (ITA), Pedro Coelho (POR)

September 27, 2011
20:30 UTC+2

Report

Pınar Karşıyaka (Turkey)	73–80	(France) Le Mans Sarthe Basket
Scoring by quarter: 16–26, 18–17, 27–12, 12–28
Pts: Chatman 17; Rebs: Karaman 15; Asts: Chatman 6		Pts: Rochestie 17; Rebs: Three players 6 Asts: Rochestie 6

Karşıyaka Arena, İzmir
Referees: Vicente Bulto (ESP), Evgeny Vetrov (RUS), Milos Koljensic (MNE)

September 27, 2011
19:00 UTC+2

Report

Norrköping Dolphins (Sweden)	62–88	(Belgium) Telenet BC Oostende
Scoring by quarter: 15–12, 19–30, 11–21, 17–25
Pts: Mitchell 13; Rebs: Balocka 6 Asts: Mitchell 4		Pts: Rich 19; Rebs: Djordjević 8 Asts: Serron 5

Norrköping
Attendance: 1166
Referees: Juris Kokainis (LAT), Haydn Jones (WAL), Torkild Rodsand (NOR)

September 27, 2011
18:00 UTC+2

Report

Lukoil Academic (Bulgaria)	70–65	(Czech Republic) BK Prostějov
Scoring by quarter: 23–17, 13–14, 15–16, 19–18
Pts: Mack 17; Rebs: Banev 7 Asts: Heath 5		Pts: Smith 22; Rebs: Peterson 10; Asts: Eitutavičius 5

Universiada Hall, Sofia
Attendance: 3,000
Referees: Charalampos Karakatsounis (GRE), Tomislav Vovk (CRO), Ciprian Stoica (ROU)

September 28, 2011
19:30 UTC+2

Report

Artland Dragons (Germany)	56–61	(Spain) Gran Canaria 2014
Scoring by quarter: 13–18, 9–13, 16–14, 18–16
Pts: Hilliard 17; Rebs: Fenn, King 5 Asts: Holston 4		Pts: Haynes 14; Rebs: Rey 8 Asts: Bellas 4

Artland-Arena, Quakenbrück
Attendance: 1,603
Referees: Srdan Dozai (CRO), Emin Mogulkoc (TUR), Lahdo Sharro (SWE)

September 28, 2011
19:30 UTC+2

Report

ETHA Engomis (Cyprus)	59–60	(Russia) Spartak St. Petersburg
Scoring by quarter: 17–15, 8–21, 13–14, 21–10
Pts: Ray 15; Rebs: Cup 8 Asts: Tutt 6		Pts: Halperin 16; Rebs: Likhodey 7 Asts: Beverley 4

Nicosia
Attendance: 100
Referees: Branislav Mrdak (SRB), Miroslav Tomov (BUL), Yair Michaelly (ISR)

=== Second leg ===
October 4, 2011
18:00 UTC+2

Report

BC Azovmash (Ukraine)	79–65	(Latvia) BK Ventspils
Scoring by quarter: 14–16, 23–16, 25–24, 17–9
Pts: Minard 24; Rebs: Rizvić 10; Asts: Ewing 5		Pts: Bakić 18; Rebs: Willard 9 Asts: Three players 2

Sportkompleks Illichivets, Mariupol
Attendance: 3,022
Referees: Anton Makhlin (RUS), Marcin Kowalski (POL), Uros Obrknezevic (SRB)

Azovmash won 153–140 on aggregate

October 4, 2011
19:00 UTC+2

Report

Spartak St. Petersburg (Russia)	83–64	(Cyprus) ETHA Engomis
Scoring by quarter: 24–21, 25–15, 21–12, 13–16
Pts: Beverley 26; Rebs: Zupan 6 Asts: Halperin 7		Pts: Okafor 15; Rebs: Ray, Lalovic 6 Asts: Massamba 4

Yubileyny Sports Palace, St. Petersburg
Attendance: 1,500
Referees: Milivoje Jovcic (SRB), Omer Esteron (ISR), Piotr Pastusiak (POL)

Spartak Saint Petersburg won 143–123 on aggregate

October 4, 2011
20:00 UTC+2

Report

Dexia Mons-Hainaut (Belgium)	74–63	(Turkey) Beşiktaş JK
Scoring by quarter: 14–18, 14–17, 25–10, 21–18
Pts: Slaughter 19; Rebs: Nivins 9 Asts: Slaughter, Singletary 4		Pts: Kemp 18; Rebs: Hawkins 8 Asts: Williams 7

Mons Arena, Mons
Attendance: 3,050
Referees: Sreten Radovic (CRO), Carlos Cortes (ESP), Petr Hrusa (CZE)

Dexia Mons-Hainaut won 144–141 on aggregate

October 4, 2011
20:00 UTC+2

Report

Cedevita Zagreb (Croatia)	84–69	(France) Élan Chalon
Scoring by quarter: 20–16, 18–14, 20–24, 26–15
Pts: Draper 18; Rebs: Baždarić 7 Asts: Draper 10		Pts: Schilb 21; Rebs: Adolphe 6 Asts: Schilb 5

Dom Sportova, Zagreb
Attendance: 3,500
Referees: Guerrino Cerebuch (ITA), Aleksandar Milojevik (MKD), Petros Papapetrou (GRE)

Cedevita Zagreb won 157–147 on aggregate

October 4, 2011
20:30 UTC+2

Report

Le Mans Sarthe Basket (France)	80–78	(Turkey) Pınar Karşıyaka
Scoring by quarter: 20–24, 25–22, 16–23, 19–9
Pts: Acker 19; Rebs: Acker 6 Asts: Rochestie 10		Pts: Ikonić 21; Rebs: Morgan, Chatman 9 Asts: Chatman 5

Antarès, Le Mans
Attendance: 4,830
Referees: Miguel Perez Perez (ESP), Ingus Baumanis (LAT), Simon Unsworth (ENG)

Le Mans won 160–151 on aggregate

October 4, 2011
21:30 UTC+2

Report

Gran Canaria 2014 (Spain)	92–65	(Germany) Artland Dragons
Scoring by quarter: 27-20, 23-21, 24-14, 18-10
Pts: Rey 14; Rebs: Rey 6 Asts: Bellas, Green 3		Pts: Strasser 11; Rebs: Grünheid 5 Asts: Holston 5

Centro Insular, Las Palmas
Attendance: 2,000
Referees: Paolo Taurino (ITA), Nicolas Maestre (FRA), Sérgio Silva (POR)

Gran Canaria won 153–121 on aggregate

October 5, 2011
17:00 UTC+2

Report

BK Prostějov (Czech Republic)	77–87	(Bulgaria) Lukoil Academic
Scoring by quarter: 16–19, 23–19, 14–32, 24–17
Pts: Eitutavičius 14; Rebs: Peterson 6 Asts: Venta 4		Pts: Owens 17; Rebs: Heath, Mack 6 Asts: Heath 3

Prostějov
Referees: Marius Ciulin (ROU), Aare Halliko (EST), David Berekashvili (GEO)

Lukoil Academic won 157–142 on aggregate

October 5, 2011
20:30 UTC+2

Report

Telenet BC Oostende (Belgium)	70–67	(Sweden) Norrköping Dolphins
Scoring by quarter: 22-18, 21-17, 8-19, 19-13
Pts: Booker 14; Rebs: Booker 10; Asts: Katnić, Djordjević 4		Pts: Ayuba 18; Rebs: Ayuba 10; Asts: Mitchell, Saks 2

Sea'Arena, Ostend
Attendance: 2,500
Referees: Sreten Radovic (CRO), Carlos Cortes (ESP), Petr Hrusa (CZE)

Telenet BC Oostende won 158–129 on aggregate
