= 2011–12 FIBA EuroChallenge =

FIBA EuroChallenge
- Season: 2011–12
- Duration: 8 November 2011 – 29 April 2012
- Teams: 32

Finals
- Champions: (Turkey) Beşiktaş Milangaz (1st title)
- Runners-up: (France) Élan Chalon
- Third place: (Russia) Triumph Lyubertsy
- Fourth place: (Hungary) Szolnoki Olaj
- Final Four MVP: (United Kingdom) Pops Mensah-Bonsu

Statistical leaders
Points	(United States) Chris Copeland	20.1
Rebounds	(United Kingdom) Pops Mensah-Bonsu	11.8
Assists	(United States) Jared Jordan	8.8

2011–12 FIBA EuroChallenge was the eighth edition of Europe's third-tier level transnational men's professional club basketball FIBA EuroChallenge Tournament, organized by FIBA Europe.

== Teams ==
The labels in the parentheses show how each team qualified for the place of its starting round.

- 1st, 2nd, 3rd, 4th, 5th, etc.: League position after eventual Playoffs
- EC: Transferred from Eurocup
  - QR: Losers from qualifying rounds

Regular season
(Germany) Artland Dragons (EC QR)	(Turkey) Pınar Karşıyaka (EC QR)	(Cyprus) ETHA Engomis (EC QR)	(Netherlands) ZZ Leiden (1st)
(Germany) EWE Baskets Oldenburg (6th)	(Turkey) Beşiktaş Milangaz (EC QR)	(Cyprus) Keravnos (4th)	(Romania) "U" Mobitelco Cluj-Napoca (1st)
(Germany) Göttingen (7th)	(Turkey) Olin Edirne (7th)	(Czech Republic) Prostějov (EC QR)	(Sweden) Norrköping Dolphins (EC QR)
(Germany) Telekom Baskets Bonn (13th)	(Turkey) Türk Telekom (10th)	(Czech Republic) Pardubice (3rd)	(Spain) Mad-Croc Funelabrada (7th)
(France) Élan Chalon (EC QR)	(Belgium) Generali Okapi Aalstar (2nd)	(Ukraine) Goverla (3rd)	(Latvia) Ventspils (EC QR)
(France) Chorale Roanne (6th)	(Belgium) Antwerp Giants (5th)	(Ukraine) Khimik (12th)	(Russia) Nizhny Novgorod (8th)
(France) Pau-Lacq-Orthez (10th)	(Slovakia) Bemaco SPU Nitra (1st)	(Georgia (country)) Armia (1st)	
Qualifying round
(Russia) Enisey (6th)	(Russia) Spartak Primorye (Note: Spartak Primorye finished second in the Russian Super League 1, the second division in Russia.) (2nd)	(Belarus) Minsk-2006 (1st)	(Austria) Arkadia Traiskirchen Lions (6th)
(Russia) Krasnye Krylia (7th)	(Hungary) Szolnoki Olaj (1st)	(Georgia (country)) Sokhumi (4th)	(Finland) Tampereen Pyrintö (1st)
(Russia) Triumph Lyubertsy (10th)	(Hungary) Atomerőmű SE (3rd)		

== Qualifying round ==
Team 1	Agg.	Team 2	1st leg	2nd leg
Spartak Primorye (Russia)	141–147	(Russia) Enisey	75–58	66–89
Triumph Lyubertsy (Russia)	168–151	(Russia) Krasnye Krylya	94–71	74–80
Sokhumi (Georgia (country))	157–175	(Belarus) Minsk-2006	94–78	63–97
Atomerőmű SE (Hungary)	155–128	(Austria) Arkadia Traiskirchen Lions	70–48	80–85
Tampereen Pyrintö (Finland)	134–137	(Hungary) Szolnoki Olaj	77–69	57–68

== Regular season ==
The 32 teams are drawn into eight groups of four. In each group, teams play against each other home-and-away in a round-robin format. The group winners and runners-up advance to the last 16, while the third-placed teams and fourth-placed teams are eliminated.

If teams in the same group finished tied on points at the end of the regular season, tiebreakers were applied in the following order:

1. Head-to-head record.
2. Head-to-head point differential.
3. Point differential during the regular season.
4. Points scored during the regular season.
5. Sum of quotients of points scored and points allowed in each regular season match.

=== Group A ===
Pos	Team	Pld	W	L	PF	PA	PD	Pts	Qualification	EWE	FUE	NIT	NOR
1	(Germany) EWE Baskets Oldenburg	6	6	0	534	428	+106	12	Advance to last 16	—	85–66	88–79	106–61
2	(Spain) Mad-Croc Fuenlabrada	6	4	2	530	477	+53	10	Advance to last 16	77–83	—	93–80	89–75
3	(Slovakia) Bemaco SPU Nitra	6	1	5	478	504	−26	7		72–77	75–86	—	108–78
4	(Sweden) Norrköping Dolphins	6	1	5	448	581	−133	7		73–95	79–119	82–64	—

Source: FIBA Europe

=== Group B ===
Pos	Team	Pld	W	L	PF	PA	PD	Pts	Qualification	BJK	ZZL	ARM	GÖT
1	(Turkey) Beşiktaş Milangaz	6	6	0	543	437	+106	12	Advance to last 16	—	76–69	103–82	105–94
2	(Netherlands) ZZ Leiden	6	3	3	434	437	−3	9	Advance to last 16	58–86	—	76–59	80–71
3	(Georgia (country)) Armia	6	3	3	441	464	−23	9		75–77	74–71	—	82–76
4	(Germany) Göttingen	6	0	6	432	512	−80	6		59–96	71–80	61–69	—

Source: FIBA Europe

=== Group C ===
Pos	Team	Pld	W	L	PF	PA	PD	Pts	Qualification	ROA	PAR	PRO	GOV
1	(France) Chorale Roanne	6	5	1	490	451	+39	11	Advance to last 16	—	88–73	87–70	81–78
2	(Czech Republic) JIP Pardubice	6	4	2	478	476	+2	10	Advance to last 16	82–77	—	98–84	72–69
3	(Czech Republic) Prostějov	6	3	3	476	487	−11	9		85–87	82–76	—	78–64
4	(Ukraine) Goverla	6	0	6	425	455	−30	6		63–70	76–77	75–77	—

Source: FIBA Europe

=== Group D ===
Pos	Team	Pld	W	L	PF	PA	PD	Pts	Qualification	NN	VEN	KHI	ATO
1	(Russia) Nizhny Novgorod	6	4	2	492	425	+67	10	Advance to last 16	—	77–63	85–73	96–51
2	(Latvia) Ventspils	6	4	2	436	422	+14	10	Advance to last 16	77–75	—	81–55	69–56
3	(Ukraine) Khimik	6	3	3	446	451	−5	9		78–87	81–67	—	83–58
4	(Hungary) Atomerőmű SE	6	1	5	399	475	−76	7		83–72	78–79	73–76	—

Source: FIBA Europe

=== Group E ===
Pos	Team	Pld	W	L	PF	PA	PD	Pts	Qualification	CHA	ANT	ENI	MOB
1	(France) Élan Chalon	6	5	1	479	481	−2	11	Advance to last 16	—	65–90	87–79	83–74
2	(Belgium) Antwerp Giants	6	4	2	474	424	+50	10	Advance to last 16	78–79	—	73–69	87–63
3	(Russia) Enisey	6	2	4	458	468	−10	8		79–80	76–72	—	73–81
4	(Romania) "U" Mobitelco Cluj-Napoca	6	1	5	446	484	−38	7		81–85	72–74	75–82	—

Source: FIBA Europe

=== Group F ===
Pos	Team	Pld	W	L	PF	PA	PD	Pts	Qualification	TRI	OKA	ETHA	OLI
1	(Russia) Triumph Lyubertsy	6	4	2	451	434	+17	10	Advance to last 16	—	83–78	60–68	70–61
2	(Belgium) Generali Okapi Aalstar	6	3	3	511	463	+48	9	Advance to last 16	83–84	—	89–73	95–70
3	(Cyprus) ETHA Engomis	6	3	3	409	438	−29	9		55–72	61–80	—	70–67
4	(Turkey) Olin Edirne	6	2	4	449	485	−36	8		89–82	70–82	92–86	—

Source: FIBA Europe

=== Group G ===
Pos	Team	Pld	W	L	PF	PA	PD	Pts	Qualification	BON	KSK	MIN	TUR
1	(Germany) Telekom Baskets Bonn	6	4	2	490	452	+38	10	Advance to last 16	—	80–65	93–81	87–80
2	(Turkey) Pınar Karşıyaka	6	3	3	476	477	−1	9	Advance to last 16	66–65	—	103–105	81–83
3	(Belarus) Minsk-2006	6	3	3	487	515	−28	9		79–71	70–79	—	74–93
4	(Turkey) Türk Telekom	6	2	4	487	496	−9	8		81–94	74–82	76–78	—

Source: FIBA Europe

=== Group H ===
Pos	Team	Pld	W	L	PF	PA	PD	Pts	Qualification	ART	SZO	KER	PAU
1	(Germany) Artland Dragons	6	5	1	520	480	+40	11	Advance to last 16	—	86–78	93–75	87–81
2	(Hungary) Szolnoki Olaj	6	4	2	500	483	+17	10	Advance to last 16	90–85	—	81–93	85–70
3	(Cyprus) Keravnos	6	2	4	483	511	−28	8		81–93	82–91	—	67–70
4	(France) Pau-Lacq-Orthez	6	1	5	446	475	−29	7		75–76	67–75	83–85	—

Source: FIBA Europe

== Last 16 ==
The sixteen teams were divided in four groups of four. In each group, teams play against each other home-and-away in a round-robin format. The group winners and runners-up advance to the quarterfinals, while the third-placed teams and fourth-placed teams are eliminated.

=== Group I ===
Pos	Team	Pld	W	L	PF	PA	PD	Pts	Qualification	VEN	ROA	EWE	ZZL
1	(Latvia) Ventspils	6	4	2	455	448	+7	10	Advance to quarterfinals	—	94–92	74–61	69–73
2	(France) Chorale Roanne	6	3	3	505	464	+41	9	Advance to quarterfinals	88–89	—	86–80	91–56
3	(Germany) EWE Baskets Oldenburg	6	3	3	456	447	+9	9		77–69	82–80	—	85–62
4	(Netherlands) ZZ Leiden	6	2	4	387	444	−57	8		57–60	63–68	76–71	—

Source: FIBA Europe

=== Group J ===
Pos	Team	Pld	W	L	PF	PA	PD	Pts	Qualification	CHA	SZO	BON	OKA
1	(France) Élan Chalon	6	3	3	494	467	+27	9	Advance to quarterfinals	—	85–64	88–66	87–72
2	(Hungary) Szolnoki Olaj	6	3	3	521	511	+10	9	Advance to quarterfinals	90–81	—	96–94	112–76
3	(Germany) Telekom Baskets Bonn	6	3	3	497	509	−12	9		91–89	89–75	—	71–63
4	(Belgium) Generali Okapi Aalstar	6	3	3	479	504	−25	9		84–64	86–84	98–86	—

Source: FIBA Europe

=== Group K ===
Pos	Team	Pld	W	L	PF	PA	PD	Pts	Qualification	FUE	BJK	NN	PAR
1	(Spain) Mad-Croc Fuenlabrada	6	6	0	465	430	+35	12	Advance to quarterfinals	—	72–70	73–70	85–70
2	(Turkey) Beşiktaş Milangaz	6	4	2	458	433	+25	10	Advance to quarterfinals	77–78	—	82–80	78–70
3	(Russia) Nizhny Novgorod	6	1	5	450	460	−10	7		70–78	64–75	—	86–65
4	(Czech Republic) Pardubice	6	1	5	434	484	−50	7		73–79	69–76	87–80	—

Source: FIBA Europe

=== Group L ===
Pos	Team	Pld	W	L	PF	PA	PD	Pts	Qualification	ART	TRI	KSK	ANT
1	(Germany) Artland Dragons	6	5	1	495	478	+17	11	Advance to quarterfinals	—	83–74	95–88	81–71
2	(Russia) Triumph Lyubertsy	6	3	3	452	463	−11	9	Advance to quarterfinals	87–70	—	75–90	79–60
3	(Turkey) Pınar Karşıyaka	6	2	4	487	488	−1	8		95–99	77–79	—	70–51
4	(Belgium) Port of Antwerp Giants	6	2	4	417	422	−5	8		63–67	83–58	89–67	—

Source: FIBA Europe

== Quarter-finals ==
The eight teams that advanced from the last 16 be played in a best-of-three playoff format. Matches were played on 13, 15 and 20 March. Team 1 played the first and the third game (if necessary) at home.

Team 1	Series	Team 2	Game 1	Game 2	Game 3
Ventspils (Latvia)	1–2	(Hungary) Szolnoki Olaj	82–63	76–82	78–82
Élan Chalon (France)	2–0	(France) Chorale Roanne	75–73	78–76	
Mad-Croc Fuenlabrada (Spain)	1–2	(Russia) Triumph Lyubertsy	75–76	78–68	65–80
Artland Dragons (Germany)	0–2	(Turkey) Beşiktaş Milangaz	73–74	63–77	

== Final Four ==
The Final Four was held from 27 until 29 April 2012 in the Főnix Hall at Debrecen, Hungary.

Semifinals
27 April
(Hungary) Szolnoki Olaj	60
(Turkey) Beşiktaş Milangaz	64
27 April
(France) Élan Chalon	84
(Russia) Triumph Lyubertsy	69

Final
29 April
(Turkey) Beşiktaş Milangaz	91
(France) Élan Chalon	86
Third place game
29 April
(Hungary) Szolnoki Olaj	87
(Russia) Triumph Lyubertsy	94

== Awards ==
=== Weekly MVP ===
==== Regular season ====
Round	Player	Team	EFF
1	(Serbia) Jovo Stanojević	(Turkey) Pınar Karşıyaka	36
2	(Puerto Rico) Nathan Peavy	(Germany) Artland Dragons	33
3	(United States) Deron Williams	(Turkey) Beşiktaş Milangaz	44
4	(United States) Erwin Dudley	(Turkey) Beşiktaş Milangaz	34
5	(Serbia) Vladimir Štimac	(Turkey) Olin Edirne	40
6	(United States) Chris Wright	(Turkey) Olin Edirne	31

==== Last 16 ====
Round	Player	Team	EFF
1	(United States) Chris Copeland	(Belgium) Generali Okapi Aalstar	30
1	(United States) Mire Chatman	(Turkey) Pınar Karşıyaka	30
1	(United States) Darren Fenn	(Germany) Artland Dragons	30
2	(Hungary) Obie Trotter	(Hungary) Szolnoki Olaj	36
3	(Serbia) Jovo Stanojević (2)	(Turkey) Pınar Karşıyaka	37
4	(Canada) Kyle Landry	(Russia) Triumph Lyubertsy	32
5	(United Kingdom) Pops Mensah-Bonsu	(Turkey) Beşiktaş Milangaz	33
6	(Turkey) İlkan Karaman	(Turkey) Pınar Karşıyaka	31

==== Quarter-finals ====
Round	Player	Team	EFF
1	(Canada) Kyle Landry (2)	(Russia) Triumph Lyubertsy	27
2	(United Kingdom) Pops Mensah-Bonsu (2)	(Turkey) Beşiktaş Milangaz	39
3	(Hungary) Obie Trotter (2)	(Hungary) Szolnoki Olaj	28

== See also ==
- 2011–12 Eurocup Basketball
