= Marcus Williams (basketball, born 1985) =

American basketball player (born 1985)

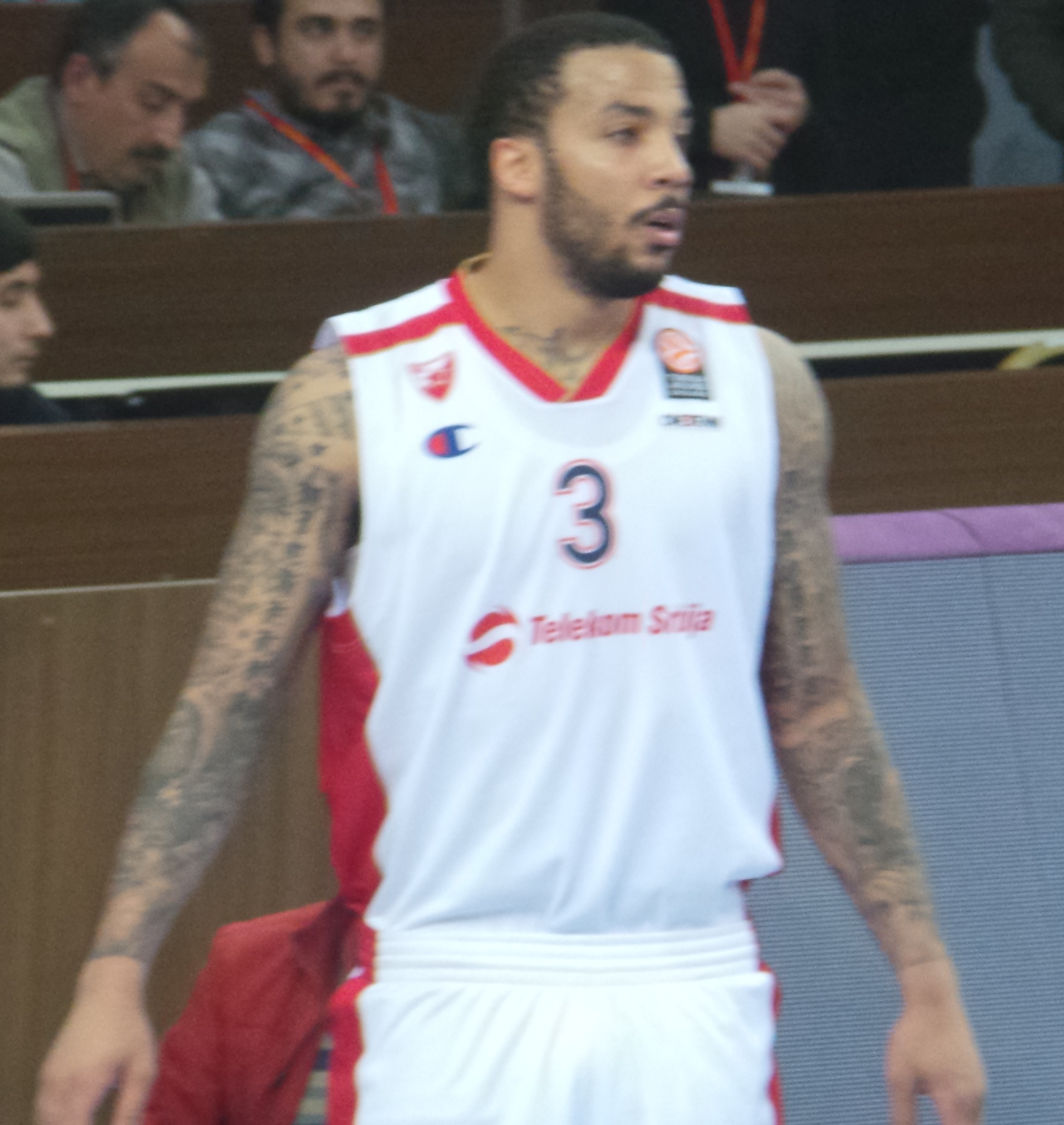
- Williams with Crvena zvezda in 2014

Personal information
- Born: December 3, 1985 (age 40) Los Angeles, California, U.S.
- Listed height: 6 ft 3 in (1.91 m)
- Listed weight: 209 lb (95 kg)

Career information
- High school: Crenshaw (Los Angeles, California); Oak Hill Academy (Mouth of Wilson, Virginia)
- College: UConn (2003–2006)
- NBA draft: 2006: 1st round, 22nd overall pick
- Drafted by: New Jersey Nets
- Playing career: 2006–2019
- Position: Point guard
- Number: 1, 3, 5

Career history
- 2006–2008: New Jersey Nets
- 2008–2009: Golden State Warriors
- 2009: Piratas de Quebradillas
- 2009–2010: Memphis Grizzlies
- 2010–2011: Enisey Krasnoyarsk
- 2011: UNICS Kazan
- 2011–2012: Jiangsu Dragons
- 2012–2013: Unicaja Málaga
- 2013–2014: Lokomotiv Kuban
- 2014–2015: Crvena zvezda
- 2016–2017: Budućnost Podgorica
- 2017: Cholet Basket
- 2017–2018: Reno Bighorns
- 2018: Piratas de Quebradillas
- 2018–2019: Stockton Kings

Career highlights
- NBA All-Rookie First Team (2007); ABA League champion (2015); Serbian League champion (2015); Serbian Cup winner (2015); Montenegrin Cup winner (2017); Russian League All-Symbolic Second Team (2011); All-BSN First Team (2009); BSN All-Star (2009); BSN All-Star Game MVP (2009); BSN assist leader (2009); BSN Skills Contest Winner (2009); Big East Most Improved Player (2005)
- Stats at NBA.com
- Stats at Basketball Reference

Marcus Darell Williams (born December 3, 1985) is an American former professional basketball player. Standing at 6 ft 3 in (1.91 m), he was mainly a point guard by position, playing college basketball for the UConn Huskies. Williams was selected with the 22nd overall pick in the 2006 NBA draft by the New Jersey Nets, and after a short stint in the National Basketball Association (NBA), spent most of his later career with various teams in Europe and Asia.

== High school and college ==
Williams attended and played for Crenshaw High School in Los Angeles, California for his 9th, 10th, and 11th years, and transferred to Oak Hill Academy (Mouth of Wilson, Virginia) for his 12th year (2002–2003).

During his freshman year at UConn, Williams was suspended for part of the season because of poor grades.

As a sophomore in the 2004–05 season, Williams averaged 9.6 points and 7.8 assists a game. He was named Big East Conference Most Improved Player.

In his junior year, he was kicked off the men's basketball team for several months, for attempting to sell stolen laptop computers along with teammate A. J. Price. Williams averaged 12.3 points, 8.6 assists, and shot 86% from the free throw line. In a game against Notre Dame, he recorded the sixth triple-double in UConn history with 18 points, 13 assists, and 10 rebounds. In the 2006 NCAA tourney, he averaged 20 points, 8.8 assists, while shooting 52% from the field, 56% from three-point range, and 96% from the free throw line. Williams scored a career-high 26 points in a memorable 98–92 overtime Sweet 16 win against Washington on March 24, 2006.

== Professional career ==
=== NBA career ===
==== New Jersey Nets (2006–2008) ====
Williams was selected 22nd overall in the 2006 NBA draft by the New Jersey Nets, using the pick they got from the Denver Nuggets in a trade for Kenyon Martin. Former teammates Josh Boone, Rudy Gay, Hilton Armstrong, and Denham Brown were also selected, with all but Brown being first-round picks. Marcus Williams was named to the Rookie team for the 2007 T-Mobile Rookie Challenge at the 2007 NBA All-Star Weekend. As a rookie in 2006–07, Williams played in 79 games, averaging 6.8 ppg and 3.3 apg.

==== Golden State Warriors (2008–2009) ====
On July 22, 2008, Marcus Williams was traded by the Nets to the Golden State Warriors for a conditional first-round pick. On March 10, 2009, he was released by the team.

==== Memphis Grizzlies (2009–2010) ====
In July 2009, Williams began playing on the Memphis Grizzlies Summer League team in Las Vegas, Nevada. He joined 2009 first-round pick Hasheem Thabeet, undrafted rookie free agent Jeff Adrien, and Rudy Gay as one of four former UConn Huskies on the Grizzlies' Summer League roster. On August 7, 2009, Williams officially signed with the Grizzlies.

=== International career ===
==== Piratas de Quebradillas (2009) ====
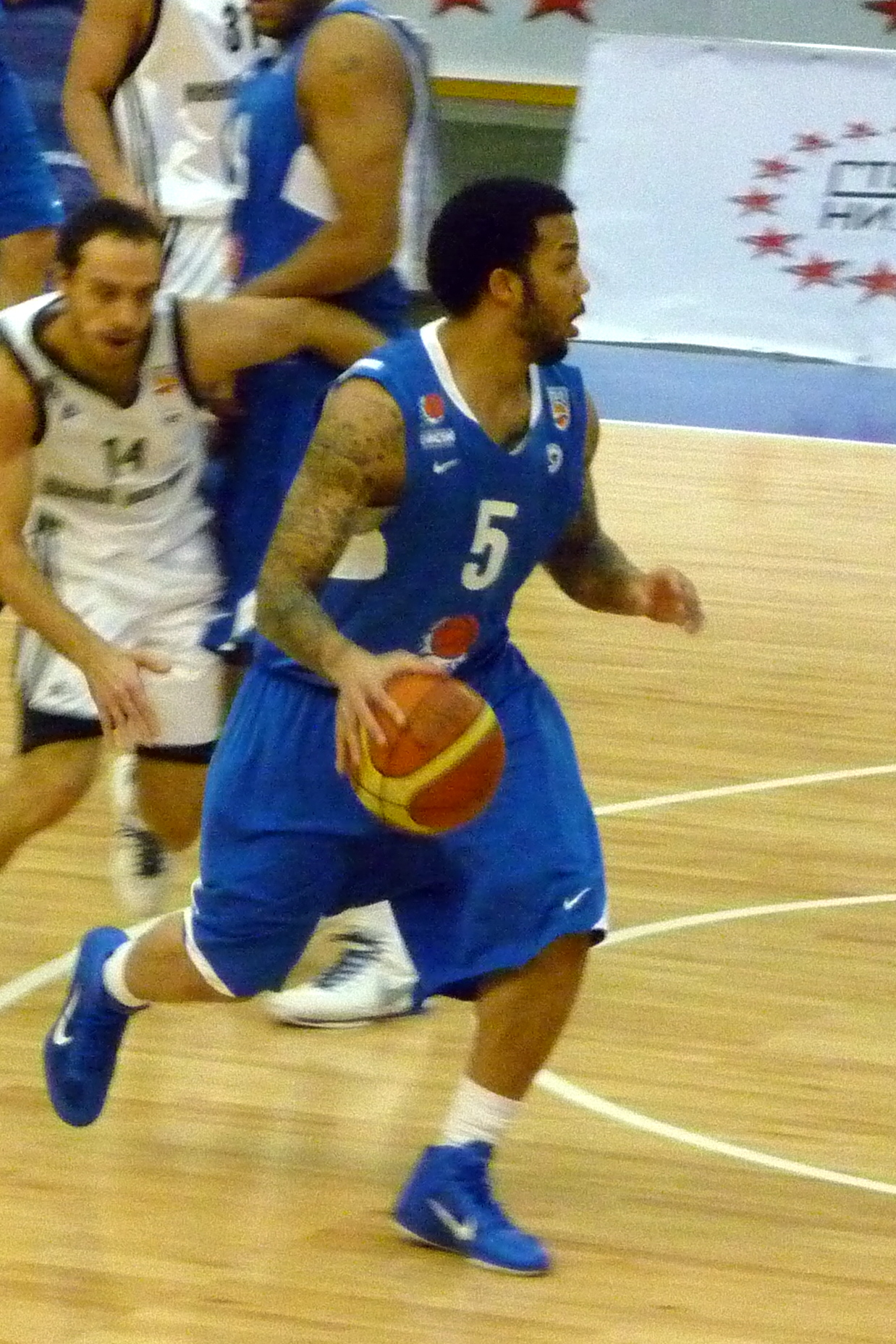
Williams during his tenure with Enisey Krasnoyarsk in 2010

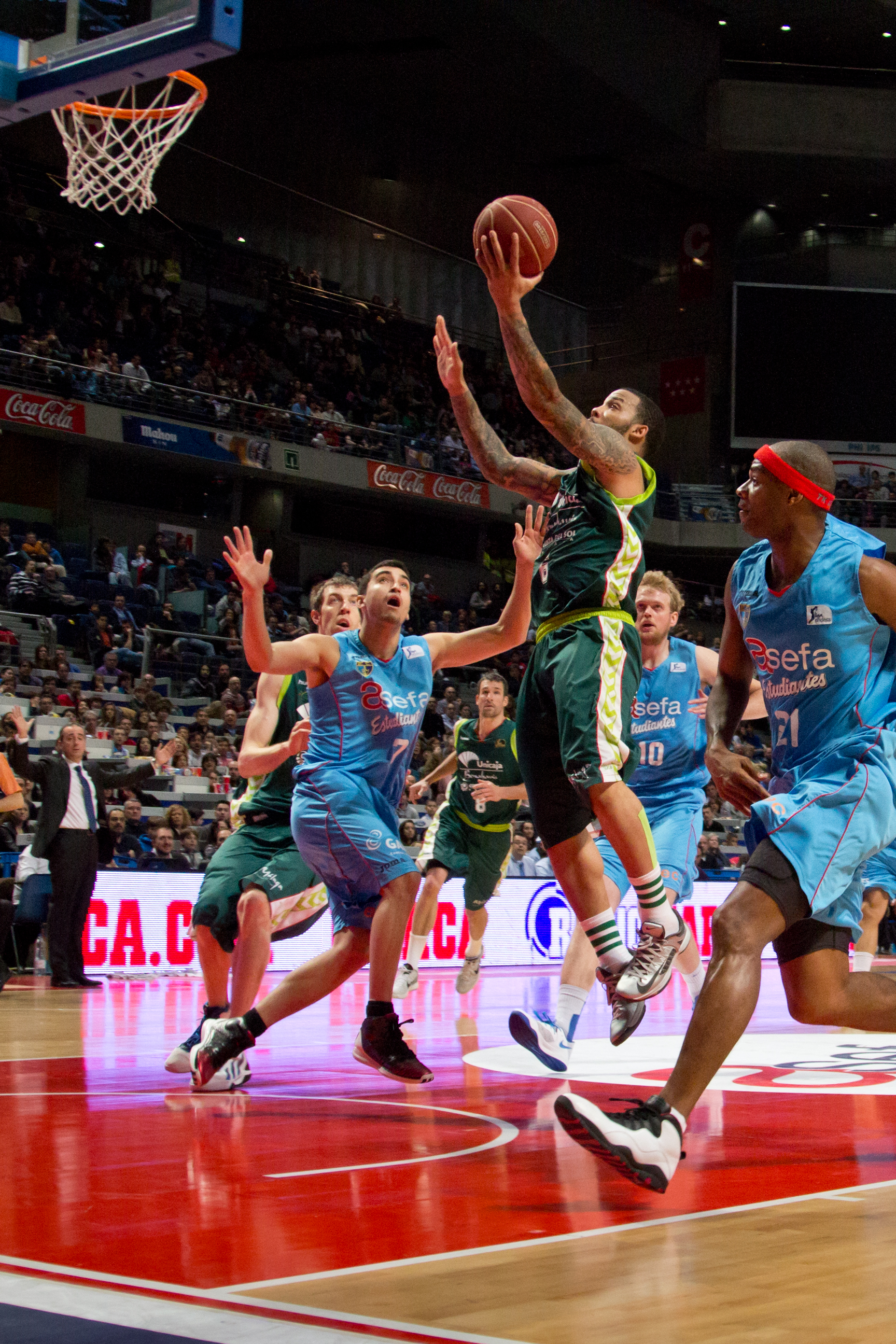
Williams playing with Unicaja Málaga against Estudiantes in 2013

Williams signed with Piratas de Quebradillas of the Puerto Rican Basketball League (BSN) in late March 2009. During the first half of the season, Williams averaged 15.0 points per game, 5.3 rebounds and 9.3 assists. He had registered one triple-double and was the league-leader in assists. He was also selected to play in the league's All-Star game and won the game's MVP award, as well as winning the Skills Contest. He also finished the season earning All-BSN First Team honors with teammate Peter John Ramos, and helping the Pirates to the best record in the league. Because he went to the Memphis Grizzlies' summer league team and left the Pirates, he missed the league finals, and the Pirates lost the championship.

==== Enisey Krasnoyark (2010–2011) ====
In August 2010, Williams signed a one-year contract with the Russian team Enisey Krasnoyarsk. Quickly becoming leader of his new team, Williams helped Enisey qualify to playoff for the first time in club's history. In quarterfinals Enisey lost series to Lokomotiv-Kuban (1:2). Williams was named "Player of the Month" in Russian PBL League in November and December. He was also selected All-Star 2nd team. Williams finished season with 14.8 points per game and as league's best in total assists (184) and assist per game (6.8).

==== Jiangsu Dragons (2011–2012) ====
In late November 2011, Williams signed a contract with the Jiangsu Dragons of China. In 25 games, he averaged 11.1 points, 3.2 rebounds, 3.8 assists and 1.2 steals in 25.8 minutes.

==== Unicaja Málaga (2012–2013) ====
In 2012, Williams signed a one-year contract with the Spanish team Unicaja Málaga. In 53 games, he averaged 9.6 points, 2.6 rebounds and 3.3 assists in 22.2 minutes.

==== Lokomotiv Kuban Krasnodar (2013–2014) ====
On August 19, 2013, Williams signed a contract with the Russian team Lokomotiv Kuban Krasnodar. In 47 games, he averaged 9 points, 2.6 rebounds and 4.2 assists in 25.6 minutes.

==== Crvena zvezda (2014–2015) ====
On August 15, 2014, Williams signed a one-year deal with Serbian team Crvena zvezda. On November 22, 2014, in a game against Galatasaray, Williams set a Euroleague record for the most assists in a single game (17). He also added 8 points while shooting just 3–16 from the field. However, his team lost after double overtime with 110–103. With Crvena zvezda, he won the Adriatic League championship, the Serbian League championship and the Radivoj Korać Cup.

On November 3, 2015, he re-signed with Crvena zvezda, but on December 28, 2015, he and the team parted ways.

==== Budućnost Podgorica (2016–2017) ====
On July 27, 2016, Williams signed with Montenegrin club Budućnost Podgorica for the 2016–17 season. On March 26, 2017, he was released by Budućnost. In 27 league games, he averaged 10.3 points, 2.5 rebounds and 6.1 assists in 25.4 minutes, while averaging 12.3 points, 1.3 rebounds, 5.1 assists and 27. minutes in 7 Eurocup games.

==== Cholet Basket (2017) ====
On 29 March 2017, Williams signed with Cholet Basket for the rest of the season. In 9 games, he averaged, 8.3 points, 2 rebounds and 3.4 assists in 23.1 minutes.

==== Reno Bighorns (2017–2018) ====
On September 26, 2017, Williams signed with the Sacramento Kings. On October 10, 2017, he was waived by the Kings after appearing in two pre-season games. On October 21, he signed with the Reno Bighorns, where he averaged 10.8 points, 2.9 rebounds, 6.5 assists and 26.6 minutes in 49 games.

==== Second Stint with Piratas de Quebradillas (2018) ====
On April 26, 2018, Williams was reported to have signed with Piratas de Quebradillas of the Baloncesto Superior Nacional.

=== Stockton Kings (2018–2019) ===
For the 2018–19 season, Williams re-joined the G League with the Stockton Kings. On February 5, 2019, Williams was suspended for five games without pay for violating the terms of the league's anti-drug program.

== Career statistics ==
Legend
GP	Games played	GS	Games started	MPG	Minutes per game
FG%	Field-goal percentage	3P%	3-point field-goal percentage	FT%	Free-throw percentage
RPG	Rebounds per game	APG	Assists per game	SPG	Steals per game
BPG	Blocks per game	PPG	Points per game	PIR	Performance index rating
**Bold**	Career high

=== NBA ===
==== Regular season ====
Year	Team	GP	GS	MPG	FG%	3P%	FT%	RPG	APG	SPG	BPG	PPG
2006–07	New Jersey	**79**	2	**16.6**	**.395**	.282	**.847**	**2.1**	**3.3**	.4	.0	**6.8**
2007–08	New Jersey	53	**7**	16.1	.379	**.380**	.787	1.9	2.6	**.5**	**.1**	5.9
2008–09	Golden State	9	0	6.0	.235	.333	.333	.4	1.4	.1	**.1**	1.3
2009–10	Memphis	62	1	14.1	.384	.296	.673	1.5	2.6	**.5**	.0	4.3
Career		203	10	15.2	.386	.321	.767	1.8	2.8	.4	.0	5.6

==== Playoffs ====
Year	Team	GP	GS	MPG	FG%	3P%	FT%	RPG	APG	SPG	BPG	PPG
2007	New Jersey	12	0	6.5	.333	.077	.800	.8	1.1	.1	.0	2.4
Career		12	0	6.5	.333	.077	.800	.8	1.1	.1	.0	2.4

=== Euroleague ===
Year	Team	GP	GS	MPG	FG%	3P%	FT%	RPG	APG	SPG	BPG	PPG	PIR
2012–13	Unicaja	**24**	5	21.7	**.362**	**.371**	.667	2.7	3.3	.6	.0	**10.5**	9.4
2013–14	Lokomotiv	**24**	10	23.0	.331	.278	**.756**	2.2	3.8	.3	.0	7.3	6.9
2014–15	Crvena zvezda	**24**	**23**	**25.8**	.317	.292	.755	**3.2**	**6.1**	**.8**	.0	9.7	**10.7**
Career		72	38	25.5	.337	.318	.723	2.7	4.4	.6	.0	8.9	9.0
