= Marcelus Kemp =

American basketball player (born 1984)

Free agent
- Position: Shooting guard / small forward

Personal information
- Born: May 18, 1984 (age 42) Seattle, Washington, U.S.
- Listed height: 6 ft 5 in (1.96 m)
- Listed weight: 221 lb (100 kg)

Career information
- High school: Garfield (Seattle, Washington)
- College: Nevada (2003–2008)
- NBA draft: 2008: undrafted
- Playing career: 2008–present

Career history
- 2008–2009: TDShop.it Livorno
- 2009–2010: Dinamo Sassari
- 2010–2011: Canadian Solar Bologna
- 2011–2012: Beşiktaş Milangaz
- 2012: Montepaschi Siena
- 2013: Cocodrilos de Caracas

Career highlights
- TBL champion (2012); Turkish Cup champion (2012); FIBA EuroChallenge champion (2012); 2× First-team All-WAC (2007–2008)

Marcelus Jalon Kemp (born May 18, 1984) is an American professional basketball player who last played for Montepaschi Siena of the Italian League. Born in Seattle, Washington, he can play as a shooting guard or small forward.
