= Obie Trotter =

American basketball player (born 1984)

No. 0 – Höttur
- Position: Point guard / shooting guard
- League: Úrvalsdeild karla

Personal information
- Born: February 9, 1984 (age 42) Silverhill, Alabama, U.S.
- Listed height: 6 ft 1 in (1.85 m)
- Listed weight: 180 lb (82 kg)

Career information
- High school: Robertsdale (Robertsdale, Alabama)
- College: Alabama A&M (2002–2006)
- NBA draft: 2006: undrafted
- Playing career: 2006–present

Career history
- 2006–2008: Gießen 46ers
- 2008–2009: Étendard de Brest
- 2009–2010: Torpan Pojat
- 2010–2012: Szolnoki Olaj
- 2012–2013: Nizhny Novgorod
- 2013–2014: Triumph Lyubertsy
- 2014: Szolnoki Olaj
- 2014–2015: KAOD
- 2015–2016: Koroivos Amaliadas
- 2016: Enel Brindisi
- 2016–2017: Pierniki Toruń
- 2017–2018: CSM Oradea
- 2018–2019: Trefl Sopot
- 2019–2020: Rosa Radom
- 2020–2021: Polski Cukier Toruń
- 2021: Latina Basket
- 2022: BK Patrioti Levice
- 2022: HLA Alicante
- 2022–present: Höttur

Career highlights
- NCAA steals leader (2005); SWAC Player of the Year (2005); 3× First-team All-SWAC (2004–2006); 2× SWAC All-Defensive Team (2005, 2006)

Obadiah Nelson "Obie" Trotter (born February 9, 1984) is an American-Hungarian professional basketball player for Höttur of the Icelandic top division. He is 6 ft 1 in (1.85 m), and plays the point guard position. He received Hungarian citizenship on June 20, 2011, and played for Hungary in the unsuccessful Eurobasket 2011 qualification campaign, averaging 11 points and four rebounds per match.

A native of Silverhill in Baldwin County, Alabama, Trotter had received interest from more established, higher tier mid-major NCAA Division I basketball programs in high school, but he ended up playing at Alabama A&M because his mother wanted him coached by a "godly man." She felt that head coach L. Vann Pettaway fit the bill, and so Trotter became an Alabama A&M Bulldog.

== College career ==
Trotter's collegiate career spanned from 2002–03 to 2005–06. He played in 114 career games and led the team in scoring in each of his final three seasons. Trotter averaged 18.1, 15.3 and 19.2 points per game, respectively, during that stretch. By the time he graduated he had become the most decorated men's basketball player in school history: three-time First Team All-Conference, two-time All-America, two-time conference defensive player of the year, one-time Southwestern Athletic Conference Player of the Year, one-time SWAC Tournament MVP, a winner of both the regular season and conference championships in 2004–05, a one-time NCAA steals leader, and at the time of his graduation, the holder of the eighth highest career steals total (346) in college basketball history. Upon the conclusion of the 2009–10 season he was named the "SWAC Player of the Decade" for the years spanning between 2000 and 2010, according to Rivals.com.

Trotter finished with 1,726 points, 483 rebounds, 466 assists, 346 steals and 228 three-point field goals made. Despite his statistically solid collegiate career, Trotter went undrafted in the 2006 NBA draft and decided to take his game overseas.

== Professional career ==
The first professional team he signed with was Gießen 46ers in Germany's Basketball Bundesliga. Trotter played for two seasons with the team, appearing in 54 total games, while averaging 9.6 points, 2.8 assists and 1.6 steals per game. He then spent the 2008–09 season in France's Ligue Nationale de Basketball B-League for Étendard de Brest before one season in Finland playing for Torpan Pojat. It was during his one-year stint in Finland that he garnered the most personal accolades in his professional career to date; Eurobasket.com named him their Finnish Guard of the Year, All-League First Team and All-League Imports Team. After that season ended, Trotter signed with Szolnoki Olaj KK and plays for them as of the 2010–11 season. He was a key member of the team in the 2011–12 season, when they achieved the greatest success in their club's history and qualified for the EuroChallenge Final Four Tournament. Excellent performances earned him a lot of attention from the clubs throughout the Europe and in the summer of 2011 he received Hungarian citizenship. Since then is a member of their national team, for which he also played in the EuroBasket 2013 qualifications. The same year he moved to Russian team Nizhny Novgorod, while he started the 2013–14 season in Triumph Lyubertsy. In January 2014 he returned to Szolnoki and signed a deal until the end of 2014–15 season with the Hungarians.

On August 19, 2020, he has signed with Polski Cukier Toruń of the Polish Basketball League (PLK).

On September 3, 2021, he has signed with Phoenix Hagen of the German ProA. However, he did not play for the team, instead joining BK Patrioti Levice of the Slovak Basketball League on January 21, 2022.

On March 6, Trotter signed with HLA Alicante of the Spanish LEB Oro.

In July 2022, Trotter signed with Úrvalsdeild karla club Höttur.

== See also ==
- List of NCAA Division I men's basketball season steals leaders
- List of NCAA Division I men's basketball career steals leaders
