= Earl Calloway =

Bulgarian-American basketball player (born 1983)

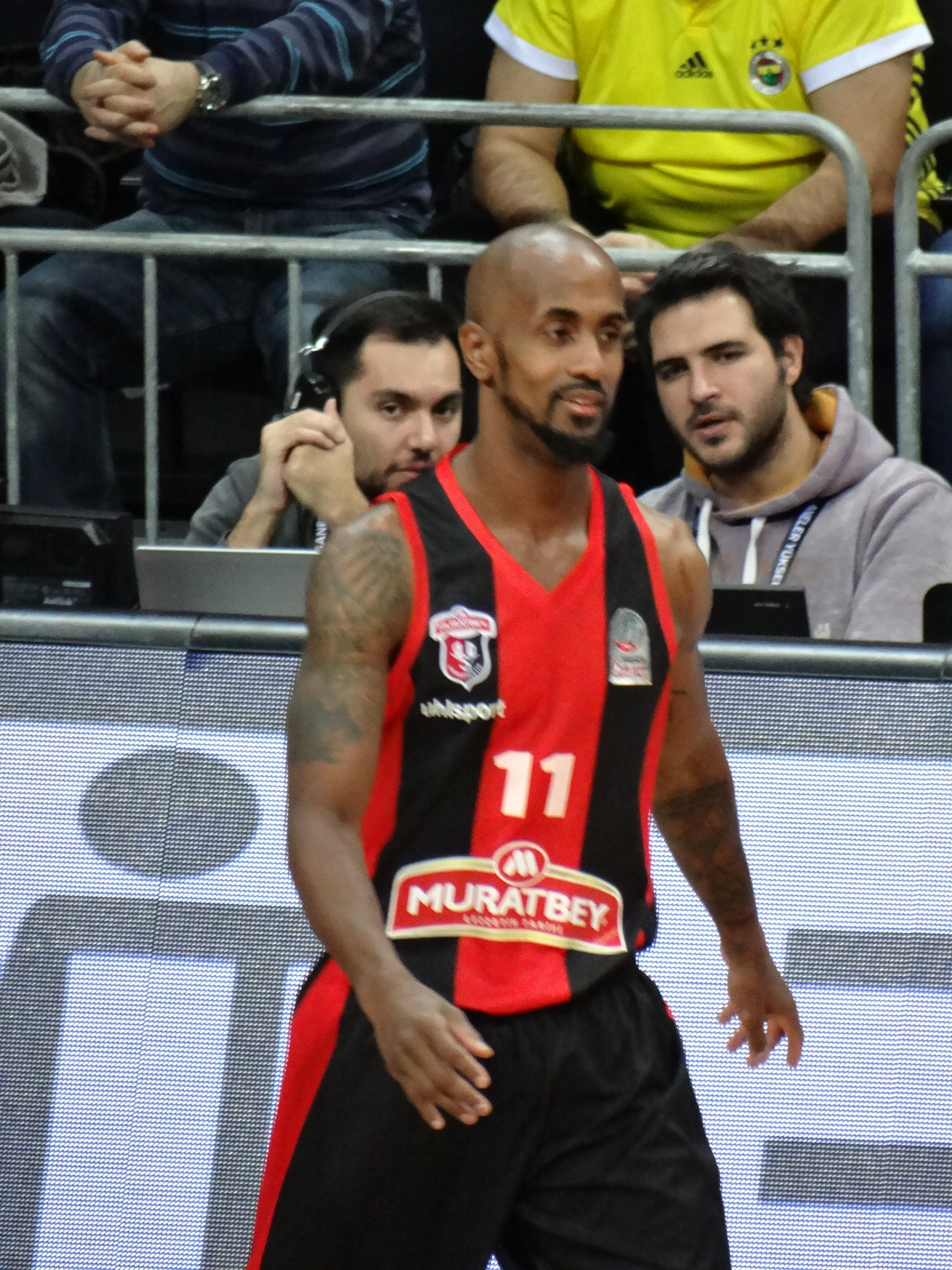
- Calloway with Uşak Sportif in 2017

Personal information
- Born: September 30, 1983 (age 43) Atlanta, Georgia
- Listed height: 6 ft 3 in (1.91 m)
- Listed weight: 175 lb (79 kg)

Career information
- High school: Westlake (Atlanta, Georgia)
- College: New Mexico State (2002–2003); Georgia Perimeter (2004–2005); Indiana (2005–2007)
- NBA draft: 2007: undrafted
- Playing career: 2007–2021
- Position: Point guard

Career history
- 2007–2008: Fort Wayne Mad Ants
- 2008–2009: Cibona Zagreb
- 2009–2012: Cajasol Sevilla
- 2012–2014: Unicaja Málaga
- 2014–2016: Gaziantep
- 2016–2017: İstanbul BB
- 2017–2018: Uşak Sportif
- 2018–2019: Afyon Belediye
- 2019–2020: Obradoiro
- 2021: Ottawa Blackjacks

Career highlights
- Croatian League champion (2009); Croatian Cup winner (2009)

Earl Genard Calloway (born September 30, 1983) is an American-born naturalized Bulgarian former professional basketball player.

== High school career ==
Calloway played high school basketball at Westlake High School, in Atlanta, Georgia. He was a member of the 1999 GHSA State Championship team at Westlake with former NFL players Adam "Pac-Man" Jones, Keyaron Fox as well as a member of the 2002 State Championship Team.

== College career ==
Calloway played college basketball at New Mexico State from 2002 to 2003, at Georgia Perimeter College from 2004 to 2005 and at Indiana University with Indiana Hoosiers from 2005 to 2007.

== Career overview ==
After going undrafted in the 2007 NBA draft, Calloway joined Fort Wayne Mad Ants of the NBA Development League. He led his team in scoring with 19 points per game and was sixth in the league with 5.8 assists and fourth with 2.1 steals per game. He also contributed 5.1 rebounds per game and was named team MVP at the end of the season.

The next season, he signed with Cibona Zagreb. With Cibona, he won the Croatian League and the Croatian Cup.

On August 3, 2009, Calloway joined Cajasol on a one-year deal. In his first season with Cajasol, he averaged 9.4 points and 4.2 assists in 36 Spanish League games. On July 23, 2010, he extended his contract until the end of the 2011–12 season.

From 2012 to 2014 he played with Unicaja.

In July 2014, he signed a two-year deal with the Turkish team Royal Halı Gaziantep.

On August 24, 2016, Calloway signed with İstanbul BB for the 2016–17 season.

On October 25, 2017, Calloway signed with Uşak Sportif.

On July 8, 2019, Calloway signed with the Spanish club Monbus Obradoiro.

On June 24, 2020, he has signed with Rouen Métropole Basket of the French Pro B. However, on August 16 it was announced that he was suffering from a knee problem and would not join the team.

On May 19, 2021, Calloway signed with the Ottawa Blackjacks of the Canadian Elite Basketball League.

=== The Basketball Tournament (TBT) (2016–present) ===
In the summers of 2016 and 2017, Calloway played in The Basketball Tournament on ESPN for team Trained To Go. He competed for the $2 million prize, and in 2016, averaged 5.3 points per game. In 2017, Calloway and team Trained To Go lost in the first round of the tournament to the Broad Street Brawlers 108–95.

== Bulgaria national team ==
Calloway has citizenship with Bulgaria, and he played with the senior men's Bulgaria national basketball team at the qualification tournament for EuroBasket 2011.

== Euroleague career statistics ==
Legend
GP	Games played	GS	Games started	MPG	Minutes per game
FG%	Field-goal percentage	3P%	3-point field-goal percentage	FT%	Free-throw percentage
RPG	Rebounds per game	APG	Assists per game	SPG	Steals per game
BPG	Blocks per game	PPG	Points per game	PIR	Performance index rating
**Bold**	Career high

Year	Team	GP	GS	MPG	FG%	3P%	FT%	RPG	APG	SPG	BPG	PPG	PIR
2008–09	Cibona	16	16	**29.6**	**.507**	.333	.842	**3.4**	**2.8**	**1.6**	.0	**12.6**	**13.8**
2012–13	Unicaja	**23**	**19**	25.0	.497	**.443**	.733	3.1	2.3	1.2	**.2**	9.3	11.3
2013–14	Unicaja	22	17	19.5	.422	.362	**.933**	2.1	2.9	.8	.1	6.7	7.1
Career		61	52	24.2	.477	.391	.824	2.8	2.6	1.2	.1	9.2	10.5
