= Pops Mensah-Bonsu =

British basketball executive & player (born 1983)

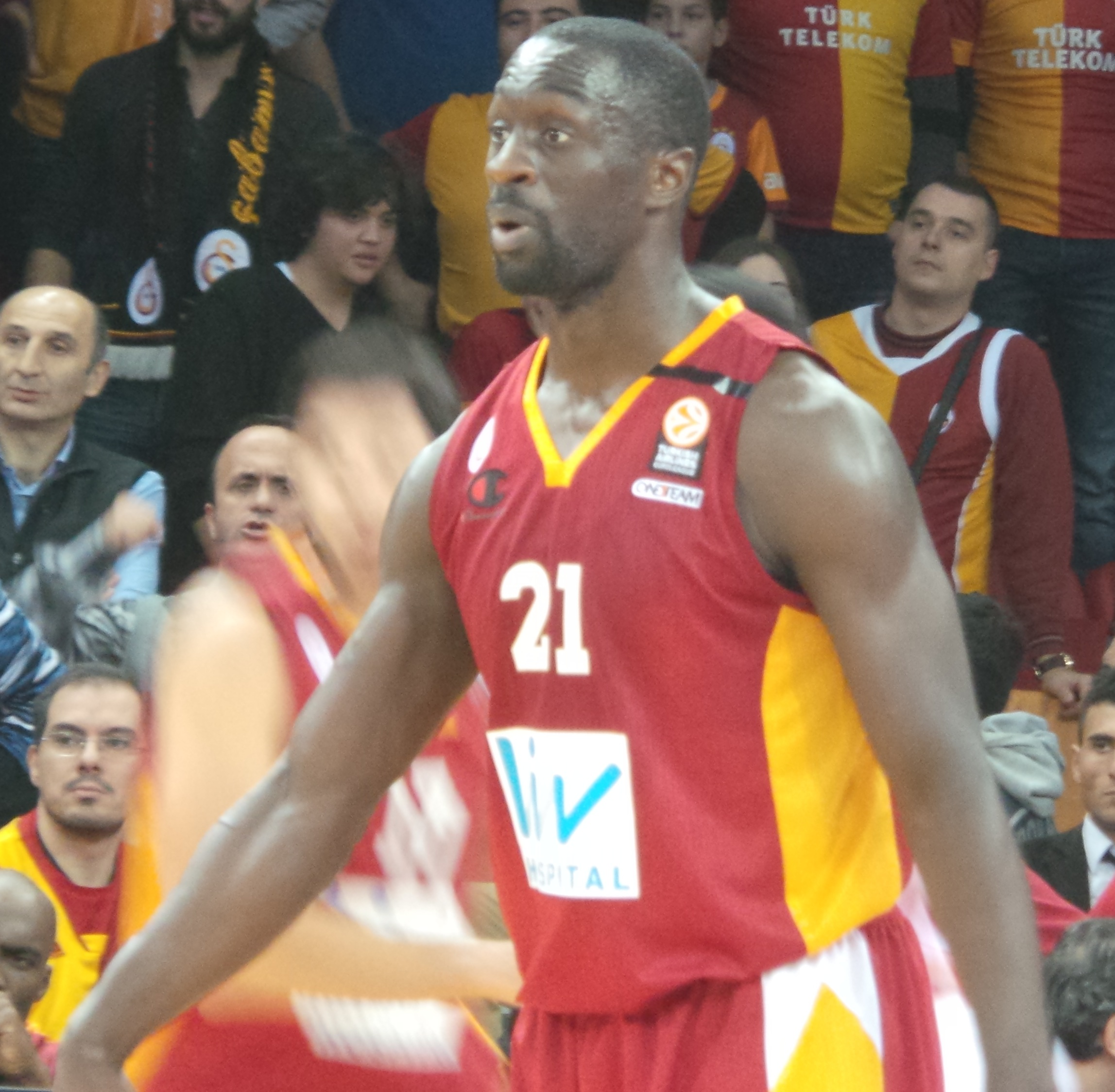
- Mensah-Bonsu with Galatasaray in 2013

Personal information
- Born: 7 September 1983 (age 43) Tottenham, London, England
- Listed height: 6 ft 9 in (2.06 m)
- Listed weight: 235 lb (107 kg)

Career information
- High school: St. Thomas More Catholic School (London, England); St. Augustine Prep (Richland, New Jersey)
- College: George Washington (2002–2006)
- NBA draft: 2006: undrafted
- Playing career: 2006–2015
- Position: Power forward / center
- Number: 21, 54, 44

Career history
- 2006–2007: Dallas Mavericks
- 2006–2007: →Fort Worth Flyers
- 2007–2008: Benetton Treviso
- 2008: Granada
- 2008: Joventut Badalona
- 2009: Austin Toros
- 2009: San Antonio Spurs
- 2009: Toronto Raptors
- 2009: Houston Rockets
- 2009–2010: Toronto Raptors
- 2010: CSKA Moscow
- 2010–2011: New Orleans Hornets
- 2011: ASVEL
- 2011–2012: Beşiktaş
- 2013: Sevilla
- 2013: Emporio Armani Milano
- 2013–2014: Galatasaray Liv Hospital
- 2014: Hapoel Jerusalem
- 2014–2015: AEK Athens

Career highlights
- EuroChallenge champion (2012); EuroChallenge Final Four MVP (2012); Turkish Cup champion (2012); TBL champion (2012); TBL Player of the Year (2012); TBL Defensive Player of the Year (2012); VTB United League champion (2010); NBA D-League All-Star Game MVP (2007); First-team All-Atlantic 10 (2006); Second-team All-Atlantic 10 (2005)
- Stats at NBA.com
- Stats at Basketball Reference

Nana Papa Yaw "Pops" Mensah-Bonsu (born 7 September 1983) is a British basketball executive and former player. He played college basketball for George Washington University and professionally for five National Basketball Association (NBA) teams as well as clubs in Spain, France, Turkey, Russia, Italy, Israel, and Greece. On an international level, he represented Great Britain and was a member of Team GB at the London 2012 Olympic Games. He also served as general manager of the Capital City Go-Go of the NBA G League from 2018 to 2020. Throughout his career, he was known for his saying "No Mercy" after blocking a shot. A documentary entitled "No Mercy", was released at the end of his career, documenting his ups and downs and him being known for being a "less heralded" player by the media.

== Early life ==
Born and raised in London, Mensah-Bonsu, whose parents are from Ghana, attended St. Thomas More Roman Catholic School. As a teenager, he represented the London Borough of Haringey at the London Youth Games, appearing in four of Great Britain's five games.

After playing junior basketball for the Hackney White Heat of the English Basketball League, Mensah-Bonsu moved to the United States where he spent his sophomore year of high school playing at the Hun School of Princeton in Princeton, New Jersey. He then transferred to St. Augustine Preparatory School in Richland, New Jersey where as a senior in 2001–02, he averaged 15 points, 12 rebounds, and four blocks per game.

== College career ==
Mensah-Bonsu majored in psychology at George Washington University, where he played power forward and center for the Colonials men's basketball team. In his four-year career, he played 112 games (71 starts) while averaging 11.7 points, 6.0 rebounds, and 1.3 blocks in 23.8 minutes per game. As a sophomore in 2003–04, he was named the Atlantic 10 Most Improved Player of the Year; as a junior in 2004–05, he was named to the All-Atlantic 10 second team; and as a senior in 2005–06, he was named to the All-Atlantic 10 first team and Atlantic 10 All-Defensive team.

In the 2004–05 season, Mensah-Bonsu helped lead the Colonials to the 2005 NCAA Tournament, where they lost in the first round. The next season was more successful, with the team ending the regular season 26–1 and being ranked in the national top 10 for the first time in 50 years. However, he suffered a knee injury near the end of the regular season and he did not return until the 2006 NCAA Tournament, where the injury lessened his production. After defeating UNC Wilmington in the first round, George Washington went on to lose to Duke in the second round.

== Professional career ==
=== 2006–2007: Dallas Mavericks ===
After going undrafted in the 2006 NBA draft, he joined the Dallas Mavericks for the 2006 NBA Summer League. On 3 August 2006, he signed with the Mavericks. During his rookie season, he had multiple assignments with the Fort Worth Flyers of the NBA Development League. In the 2006–07 season, he managed just 12 games for the Mavericks, averaging 2.4 points and 1.8 rebounds in 5.9 minutes per game.

In July 2007, Mensah-Bonsu re-joined the Mavericks for the 2007 NBA Summer League, but was later waived by the team on 31 August 2007.

=== 2007–2008: Benetton Treviso, Granada and Joventut Badalona ===
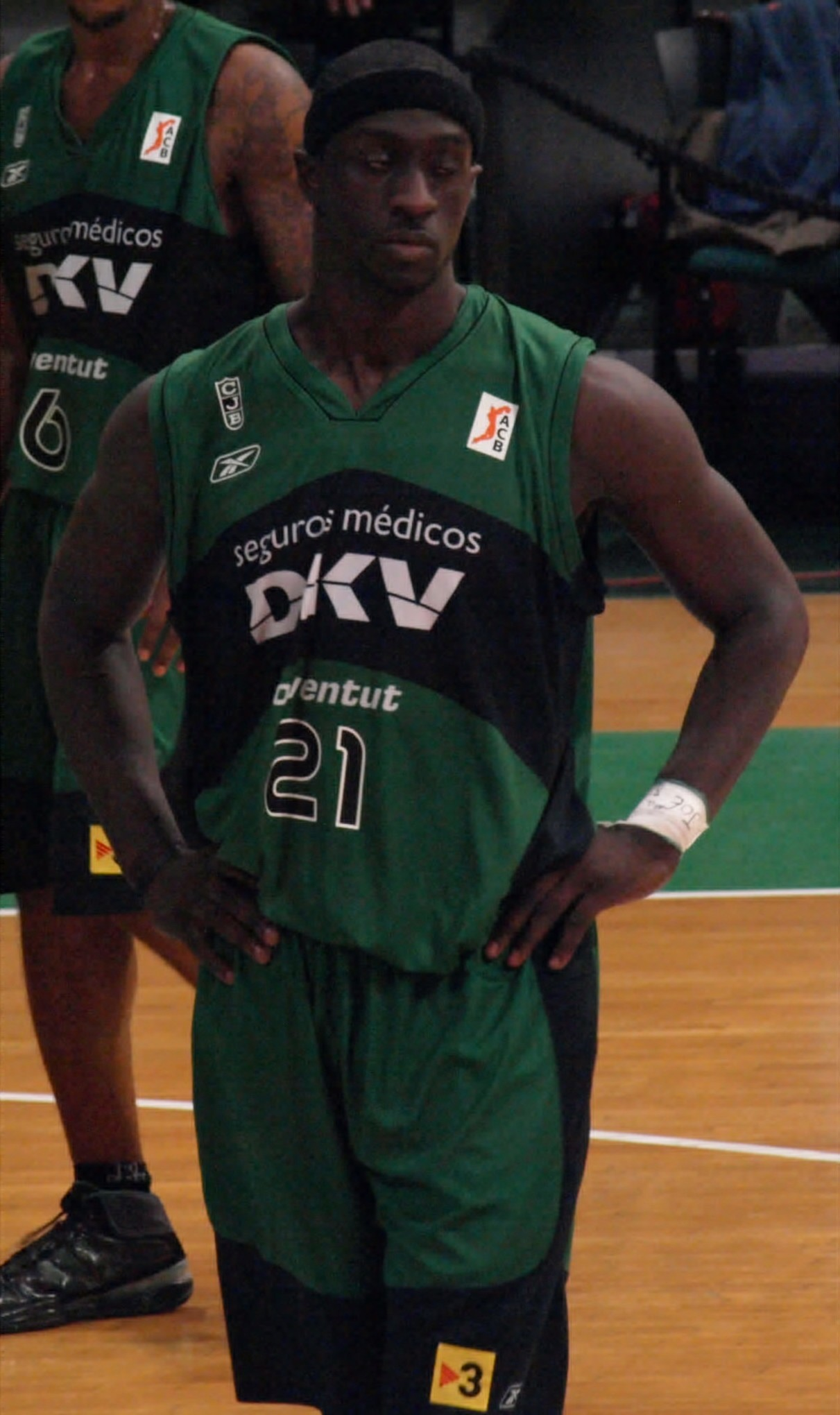
Mensah-Bonsu with Joventut Badalona in 2008

In September 2007, Mensah-Bonsu signed a one-year deal with Benetton Treviso of the Lega Basket Serie A.

In May 2008, Mensah-Bonsu signed with CB Granada of Spain for the team's final game of the season.

In July 2008, Mensah-Bonsu initially joined the Dallas Mavericks for the 2008 NBA Summer League, but later joined the Minnesota Timberwolves where he played four games and averaged 14.3 points per game. On 15 August 2008, he signed a one-year deal with Joventut Badalona. On 3 November 2008, he returned to the United States after injuring his shoulder playing for Joventut. A month later, he parted ways with Joventut to focus on recovery.

=== 2009–2011: NBA and NBA Development League ===
On 28 January 2009, Mensah-Bonsu was acquired by the Austin Toros of the NBA Development League. On 25 February 2009, he signed a 10-day contract with the San Antonio Spurs. However, on 4 March 2009, he was released by the Spurs after appearing in just three games. Two days later, he signed with the Toronto Raptors for the rest of the 2008–09 season.

On 29 June 2009, the Raptors extended a qualifying offer to Mensah-Bonsu in order to make him a restricted free agent. However, the Raptors later withdrew their qualifying offer on 7 July 2009. In August 2009, Mensah-Bonsu signed with the Houston Rockets. On 13 November 2009, he was waived by the Rockets after managing just four games. Four days later, he was claimed off waivers by the Toronto Raptors. On 5 January 2010, he was waived by the Raptors.

On 12 January 2010, Mensah-Bonsu signed with CSKA Moscow of Russia for the rest of the 2009–10 season.

On 9 August 2010, Mensah-Bonsu signed a one-year deal (with the option of a second) with Caja Laboral of the Liga ACB. He later left during pre-season for medical reasons. On 24 September 2010, he signed with the New Orleans Hornets. On 4 January 2011, he was waived by the Hornets.

On 17 February 2011, Mensah-Bonsu signed with ASVEL Basket of France for the rest of the 2010–11 season.

=== 2011–2012: Beşiktaş ===
On 5 December 2011, Mensah-Bonsu signed with Beşiktaş of Turkey for the 2011–12 season. He went on to win the Turkish League championship, Turkish Cup, and the EuroChallenge. He was named the TBL Player of the Year.

=== 2012–2013: Sevilla and Olimpia Milano ===
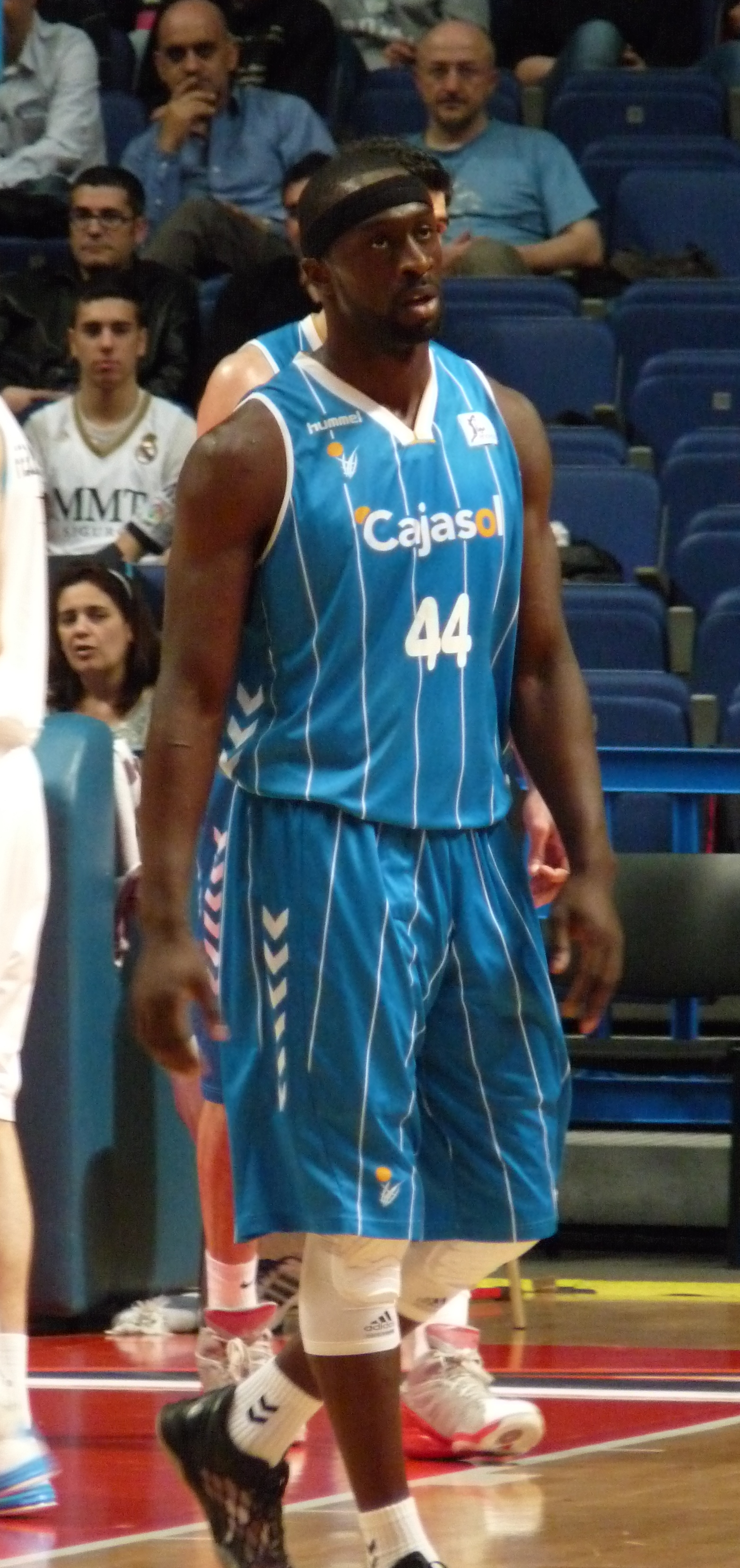
Mensah-Bonsu with Cajasol Sevilla in 2013

On 2 August 2012, Mensah-Bonsu signed a two-year deal with Maccabi Tel Aviv of the Israeli Basketball Premier League. However, he was later waived by Maccabi on 19 September 2012 before appearing in a game for them after physicals showed he had not recovered from injuries picked up during the London Olympics.

On 4 March 2013, Mensah-Bonsu signed with Cajasol Sevilla of Spain for the rest of the 2012–13 season. On 16 April 2013, he parted ways with Sevilla after managing just six games. Two days later, he signed with Emporio Armani Milano of Italy for the rest of the season.

=== 2013–2014: Galatasaray ===
On 27 September 2013, Mensah-Bonsu signed with the Washington Wizards. However, he was later waived by the Wizards on 24 October 2013 after appearing in four preseason games. Four days later, he signed with Galatasaray Liv Hospital of Turkey for the 2013–14 season. On 31 October, he made his debut in a Euroleague game against Unicaja Málaga, in which he recorded 10 points and 11 rebounds. His time with the team was marred by an in-game fight with Olympiacos centre Mirza Begić on 28 November 2013. He was banned for three games and ordered fined €10,001.

=== 2014–2015: Hapoel Jerusalem and AEK Athens ===
On 30 September 2014, Mensah-Bonsu joined with the Denver Nuggets training camp. However, the next day, he left the Nuggets for personal reasons.

On 20 November 2014, Mensah-Bonsu signed with Hapoel Jerusalem of Israel for the 2014–15 season. On 23 December 2014, he parted ways with Hapoel after appearing in two league games and four Eurocup games. On 27 December 2014, he signed with AEK Athens for the rest of the 2014–15 Greek Basket League season.

On 26 June 2015, Mensah-Bonsu was suspended for two years of any sports activity involvement after testing positive for amphetamines, which he claimed was from an approved, prescribed medicine.

=== The Basketball Tournament ===
Mensah-Bonsu competed for Team City of Gods in The Basketball Tournament. He was a forward on the 2015 team that made it to the semifinals, losing to Overseas Elite 84–71.

== National team career ==
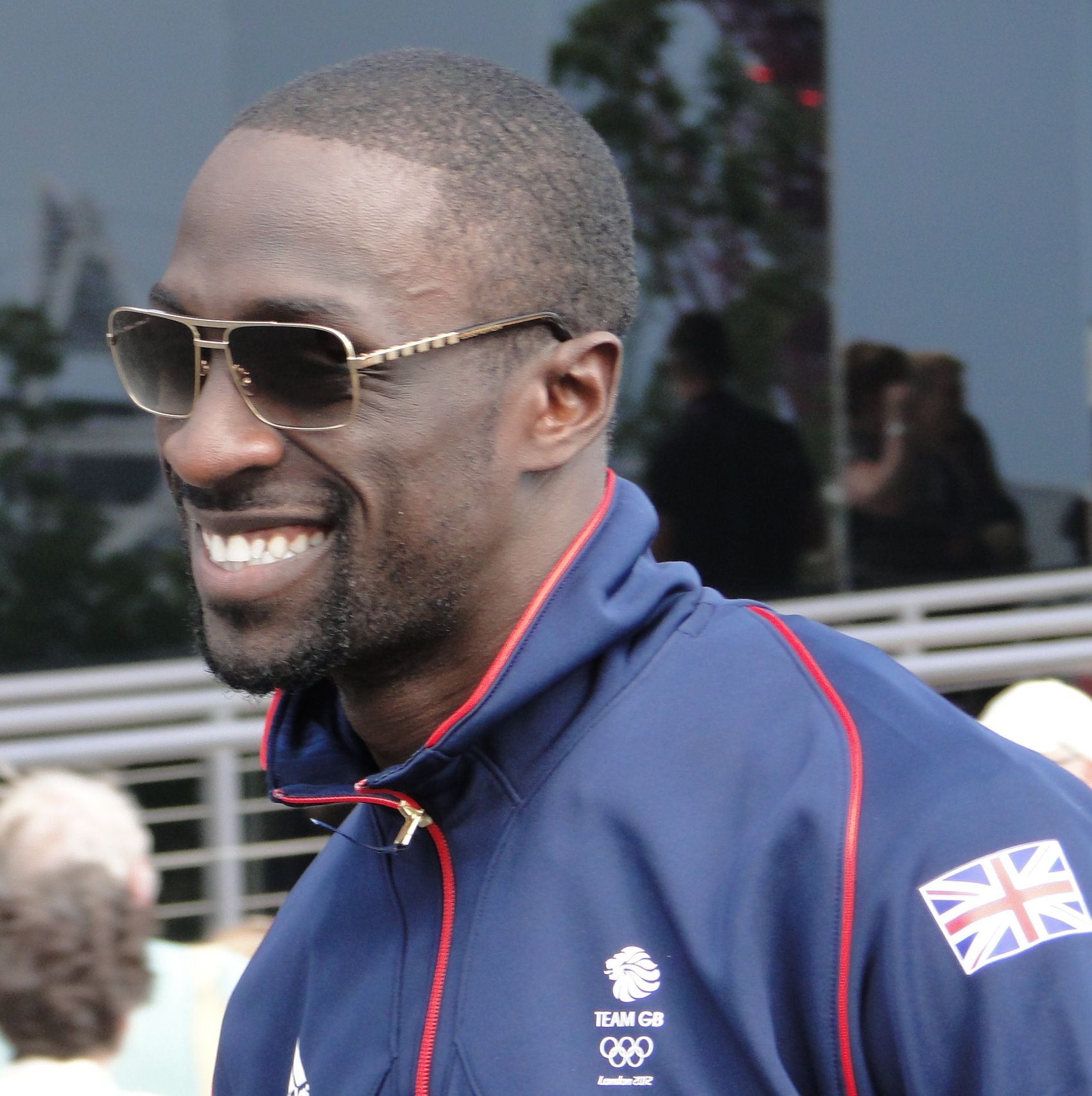
Mensah-Bonsu with the Great Britain national team at the 2012 London Olympics

Mensah-Bonsu earned 40 international caps for the Great Britain men's national team between 2008 and 2012. He averaged 15.3 points and 8.8 rebounds per game during his international career. He recorded 14 double-doubles including a career best 32 points and 21 rebounds against Bosnia and Herzegovina on 26 August 2010.

Mensah-Bonsu was part of the GB team that qualified for the 2009 EuroBasket. During qualification, he averaged 12.2 points, 10 rebounds, and 1.8 blocks per game. He went on to join the British squad for their first appearance in the EuroBasket Tournament. The team lost all three of their first-round games but were competitive throughout including a very close game with world champions Spain.

Mensah-Bonsu was again part of the British team in 2010 as they qualified for FIBA EuroBasket 2011 with a 6–2 record. During qualification, he led all Division A players with 13.5 rebounds per game, and also finished sixth in points (19.3) and blocks (1.3).

Mensah-Bonsu was selected for the final 12-man Great Britain roster for the 2012 Summer Olympics in London. He played in four games, recording 46 points and 29 rebounds. He missed Great Britain's final group game – a 90–58 win over China – due to injury. Great Britain finished with a 1–4 record, failing to qualify for the knockout stage.

== Managerial career ==
On 14 October 2015, after receiving a two-year ban for doping, Pops announced retirement from professional basketball. He then began working as an Advanced Pro Scout for the San Antonio Spurs. On 7 August 2018, the Capital City Go-Go, the new NBA G League affiliate of the Washington Wizards, announced that Mensah-Bonsu had been made the team's first general manager. He left the team in 2020.

== Career statistics ==
Legend
GP	Games played	GS	Games started	MPG	Minutes per game
FG%	Field-goal percentage	3P%	3-point field-goal percentage	FT%	Free-throw percentage
RPG	Rebounds per game	APG	Assists per game	SPG	Steals per game
BPG	Blocks per game	PPG	Points per game	PIR	Performance index rating
**Bold**	Career high

=== NBA ===
==== Regular season ====
Year	Team	GP	GS	MPG	FG%	3P%	FT%	RPG	APG	SPG	BPG	PPG
2006–07	Dallas	12	0	5.9	.647	.000	.389	1.8	.0	.1	.0	2.4
2008–09	San Antonio	3	0	6.7	**.714**	.000	**.714**	3.3	.0	.3	.3	5.0
2008–09	Toronto	**19**	0	**13.8**	.354	.000	.683	**5.4**	**.3**	**.4**	.2	**5.1**
2009–10	Houston	4	0	3.3	.250	.000	.500	1.0	**.3**	.3	.3	1.3
2009–10	Toronto	16	0	6.7	.414	.000	.556	1.9	.1	.2	**.5**	2.1
2010–11	New Orleans	7	0	5.0	.333	.000	.000	1.6	**.3**	.0	.0	.3
Career		61	0	8.3	.410	.000	.589	3.0	.2	.2	.2	3.0

=== EuroLeague ===
Year	Team	GP	GS	MPG	FG%	3P%	FT%	RPG	APG	SPG	BPG	PPG	PIR
2008–09	Joventut Badalona	2	1	**27.6**	.379	.000	**.938**	**11.5**	**2.0**	**2.0**	**2.5**	**10.3**	**26.0**
2009–10	CSKA Moscow	9	0	8.0	.500	.000	.500	1.3	.1	.7	.7	4.1	4.3
2013–14	Galatasaray	**18**	**8**	21.4	**.571**	.000	.585	6.5	.5	.4	.4	8.4	11.5
Career		29	9	17.6	.521	.000	.631	5.2	.5	.6	.6	7.8	10.3

=== College ===
Year	Team	GP	GS	MPG	FG%	3P%	FT%	RPG	APG	SPG	BPG	PPG
2002–03	George Washington	29	26	24.7	.585	.000	.667	5.7	.4	1.0	.9	10.1
2003–04	George Washington	30	1	21.2	.616	.000	.685	5.4	.4	.8	1.0	11.6
2004–05	George Washington	30	24	24.3	.571	.000	.571	6.6	.8	.9	1.5	12.6
2005–06	George Washington	23	20	25.3	.564	.000	.534	6.7	.8	.4	1.7	12.6

== Personal life ==
In the Twi language, Mensah-Bonsu's name means King (Nana) Father (Papa) Thursday-Born (Yaw) Third Son (Mensah) Whale (Bonsu). In several interviews, Mensah-Bonsu has suggested that his family earned its surname when an ancestor slew a whale.

Mensah-Bonsu is the son of Henry and Agnes Mensah-Bonsu, and has four siblings: Audrey, Kojo, Wiafe and Benson.

He is a supporter of Tottenham Hotspur F.C.

== See also ==
- List of European basketball players in the United States
