= Nihad Đedović =

Bosnian professional basketball player

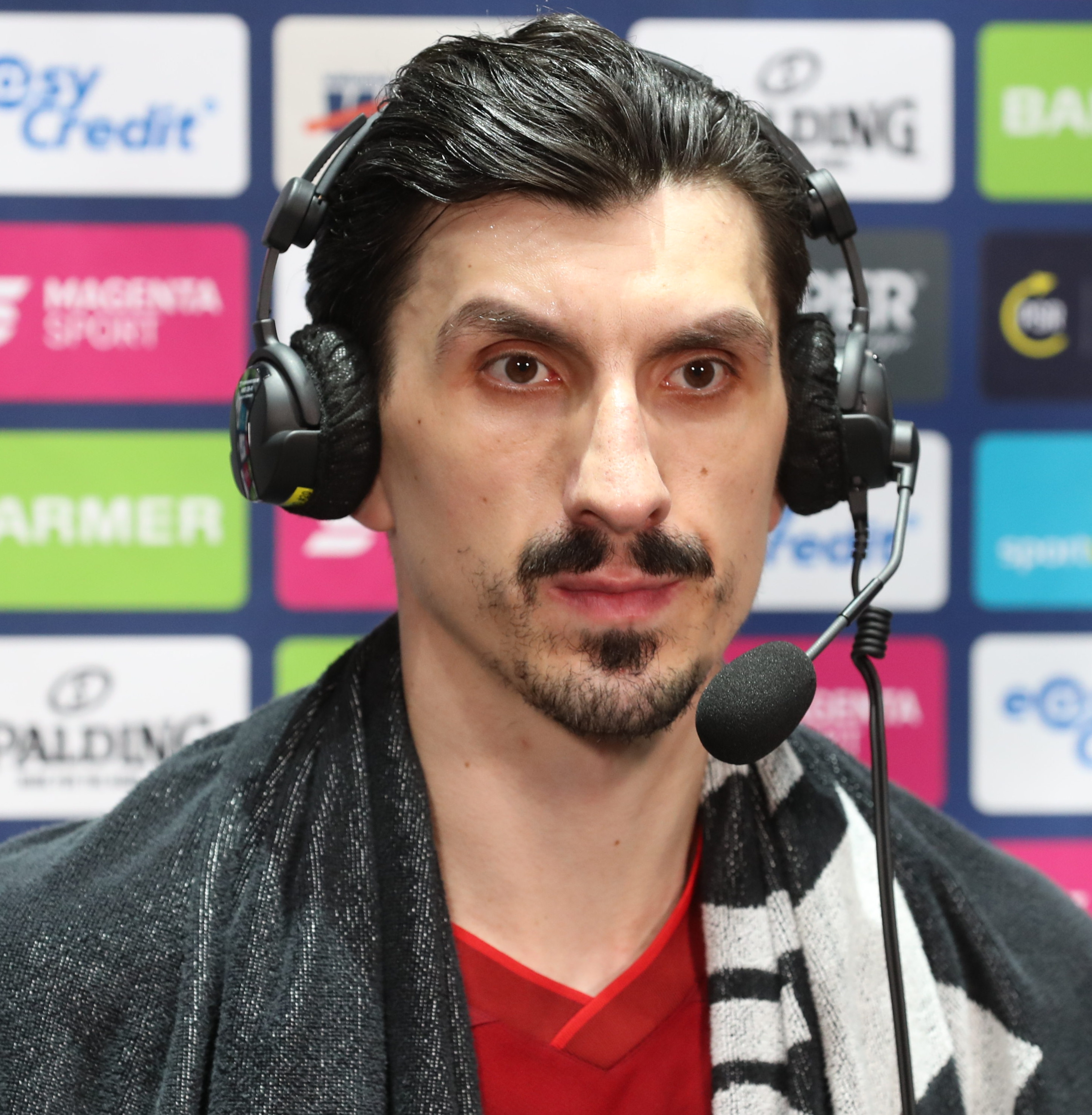
- Đedović with Bayern Munich in 2022

No. 14 – Unicaja Málaga
- Position: Shooting guard / Small forward
- League: Liga ACB

Personal information
- Born: January 12, 1990 (age 36) Višegrad, SR Bosnia and Herzegovina, SFR Yugoslavia
- Listed height: 6 ft 6 in (1.98 m)
- Listed weight: 198 lb (90 kg)

Career information
- NBA draft: 2012: undrafted
- Playing career: 2005–present

Career history
- 2005–2007: Bosna
- 2007–2012: FC Barcelona
- 2007–2009: →Cornellà
- 2009–2010: →Obradoiro CAB
- 2010–2012: →Virtus Roma
- 2012: Galatasaray
- 2012–2013: Alba Berlin
- 2013–2022: Bayern Munich
- 2022–present: Unicaja Málaga

Career highlights
- 2x FIBA Intercontinental Cup champion (2024, 2025); 2× Basketball Champions League champion (2024, 2025); Spanish League champion (2009); Copa del Rey (2023, 2025); Spanish Supercopa (2024); 3× German League champion (2014, 2018, 2019); 3× German Cup winner (2013, 2018, 2021); BBL Finals MVP (2019); 3× BBL All-Star (2014–2016); All-BBL Second Team (2015)

Nihad Đedović (born January 12, 1990) is a Bosnian professional basketball player for Unicaja Málaga of the Liga ACB. He also represented the Bosnia and Herzegovina national basketball team internationally.

== Professional career ==
Đedović started his career with KK Bosna, but FC Barcelona signed him when he was just 16 years old. He never got a real chance to play in Barcelona, and spent most of the time on loans in Cornellà, Obradoiro and with Virtus Roma. After leaving Barcelona, he played for Galatasaray and Alba Berlin.

In July 2013 he signed for Bayern Munich. In July 2014, it was announced that he signed a two-year extension with the team. On July 11, 2016, Đedović agreed on a contract extension with Bayern until 2018, including a team option for the 2018–19 season.

On June 22, 2022, he signed with Unicaja of the Liga ACB. On March 6, 2025, he signed a contract extension with the team.

== Bosnian national team ==
He was one of the key players of Bosnia and Herzegovina national team. On EuroBasket 2011 he averaged 10.6 points, 5.2 rebounds and 4.2 assists per game, while on EuroBasket 2013 he averaged 17.8 points, 5.2 rebounds and 4.2 assists per game.

== Career statistics ==
Legend
GP	Games played	GS	Games started	MPG	Minutes per game
FG%	Field-goal percentage	3P%	3-point field-goal percentage	FT%	Free-throw percentage
RPG	Rebounds per game	APG	Assists per game	SPG	Steals per game
BPG	Blocks per game	PPG	Points per game	PIR	Performance index rating
**Bold**	Career high

=== EuroLeague ===
Year	Team	GP	GS	MPG	FG%	3P%	FT%	RPG	APG	SPG	BPG	PPG	PIR
2007–08	Barcelona	1	0	5.8	.000	.000	.500	2.0	.0	.0	.0	1.0	3.0
2008–09	Barcelona	3	0	3.3	.000	.000	.000	.3	.0	.0	.0	.0	-1.0
2010–11	Lottomatica	15	15	**27.3**	.426	.194	.742	3.1	2.1	**1.7**	**.3**	9.3	8.9
2012–13	Alba Berlin	**23**	13	23.5	.411	.265	.695	3.3	2.5	1.0	.0	8.6	7.6
2013–14	Bayern	18	**16**	25.5	.458	**.400**	**.921**	**3.6**	2.3	.8	.1	**11.7**	10.4
2014–15	Bayern	10	7	25.5	.439	.375	.818	2.8	2.4	.5	.2	11.6	10.5
2015–16	Bayern	10	8	26.6	**.469**	.333	.857	3.0	2.6	1.2	.0	12.4	**12.0**
2018–19	Bayern	30	28	23.0	.463	.333	.836	2.5	**2.7**	1.0	.0	9.9	10.0
Career		110	87	24.0	.443	.319	.799	2.9	2.4	1.0	.1	9.9	9.2

== Personal life ==
Đedović spent most of the first seven years of his life in Munich, Germany, due to the Bosnian War. Returning to Sarajevo in 1997, there was no infrastructure for him to continue playing football, but a basketball club opened in the city. He is the older brother of Nedim Đedović. He has also held German citizenship since April 2015.

Đedović has gained international attention for his physical resemblance to Swedish footballer Zlatan Ibrahimović, whose father was Bosnian.
