= Steed Tchicamboud =

French basketball player

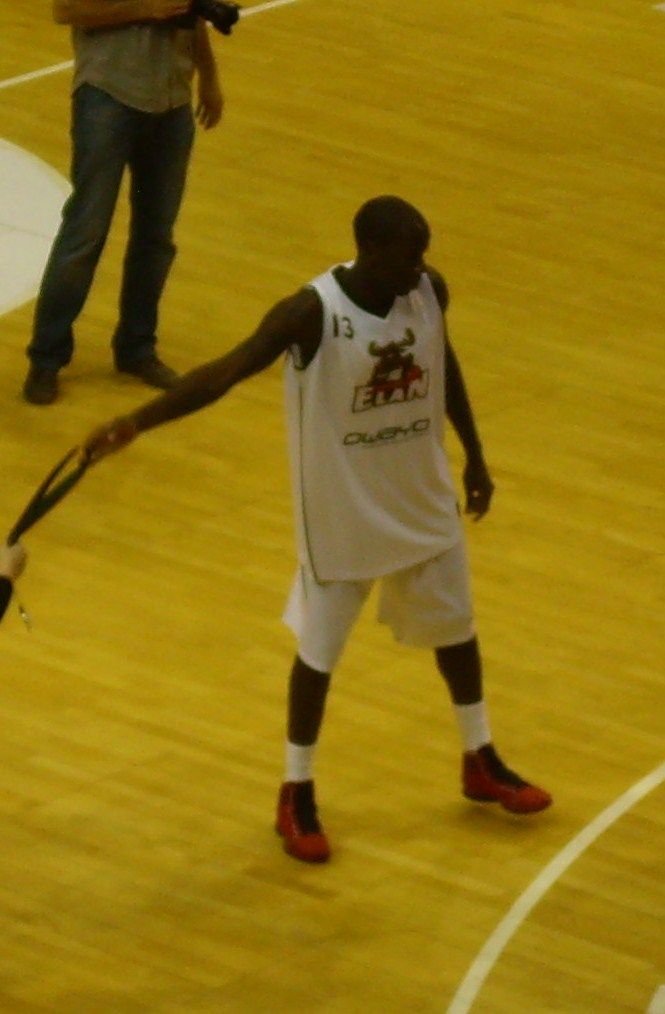
- Tchicamboud with Élan Chalon in 2011

Personal information
- Born: 18 June 1981 (age 45) Clichy-la-Garenne
- Listed height: 1.93 m (6 ft 4 in)
- Listed weight: 77 kg (170 lb)

Career information
- NBA draft: 2003: undrafted
- Playing career: 1999–2016
- Position: Point guard
- Number: 13, 18, 23

Career history
- 1999–2002: Élan Chalon
- 2002–2003: C.S. Autun Basket
- 2003–2005: Saint-Quentin
- 2005–2006: Reims Champagne Basket
- 2006–2008: Cholet Basket
- 2008–2010: SLUC Nancy
- 2010–2014: Élan Chalon
- 2014: Limoges CSP
- 2015: Chorale Roanne
- 2015: Paris-Levallois
- 2016: SLUC Nancy

Career highlights
- LNB Pro A champion (2012); 2× French Cup champion (2011–2012); 2× Semaine des As Cup champion (2008, 2012); 3× French All-Star (2007, 2009, 2013); EuroBasket 2011 🥈 2nd place

Steed Tchicamboud (born 18 June 1981) is a French former professional basketball player who played for 17 seasons in the French LNB Pro A, most notably for Élan Chalon, Cholet Basket, and SLUC Nancy. He represented the French national team internationally, winning a silver medal with the team at EuroBasket 2011.

== Professional career ==
He played for Élan Chalon from 2010 to 2014.

On 26 November 2014 he left Chalon and signed a one-month deal with Limoges CSP. In February 2015, he left Limoges and signed with Chorale Roanne for the rest of the season.

On 12 October 2015 he signed a two-month deal with Paris-Levallois. On 9 December he parted ways with Paris.

== French national team ==
Tchicamboud played 16 games with the senior men's French national basketball team in 2008.

He played at EuroBasket 2011, where he won the silver medal.
