= Blake Schilb =

American basketball player (born 1983)

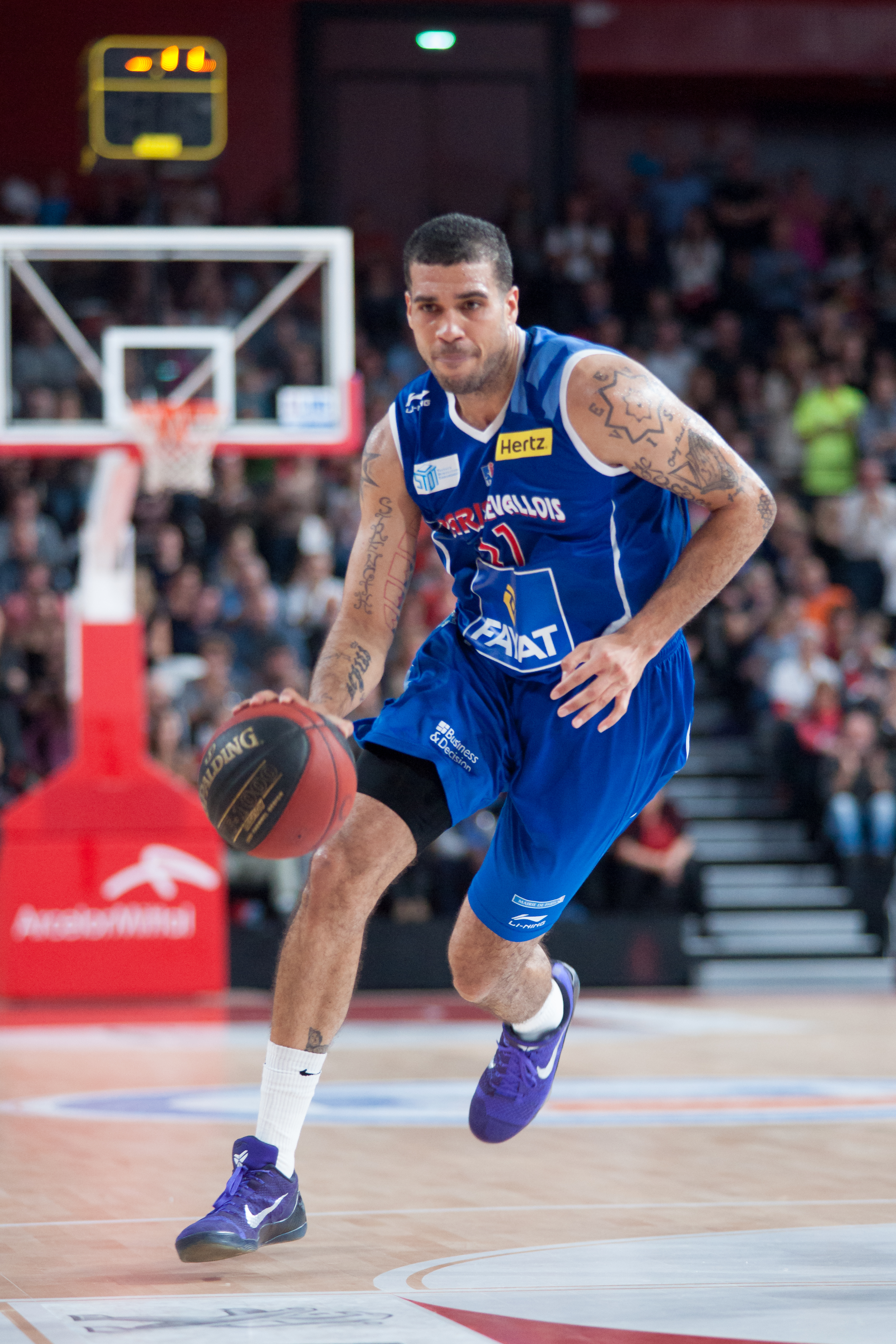
- Schilb with Paris-Levallois in 2014

Personal information
- Born: December 23, 1983 (age 42) Monmouth, Illinois, U.S.
- Listed height: 6 ft 6 in (1.98 m)
- Listed weight: 210 lb (95 kg)

Career information
- High school: Rantoul Township (Rantoul, Illinois); Brewster Academy (Wolfeboro, New Hampshire)
- College: Loyola Chicago (2003–2007)
- NBA draft: 2007: undrafted
- Playing career: 2007–2022
- Position: Small forward

Career history
- 2007–2009: ČEZ Nymburk
- 2009–2013: Élan Chalon
- 2013–2014: Crvena zvezda
- 2014–2015: Paris-Levallois
- 2015–2017: Galatasaray
- 2017–2018: Real Betis
- 2018–2020: Champagne Châlons-Reims
- 2021: USK Praha

Career highlights
- EuroCup champion (2016); Liga ACB Free Throw Percentage leader (2018); 2× Czech League champion (2008, 2009); 2× Czech Cup winner (2008, 2009); LNB Pro A champion (2012); 2× French Cup winner (2011, 2012); French Leaders Cup winner (2012); French League Foreign Player's MVP (2012); 2× LNB Pro A All-Star (2011, 2012); French League Finals MVP (2012)

Blake Schilb (born December 23, 1983) is an American-born naturalized Czech former professional basketball player who last played for USK Praha of the Czech NBL. Standing 6 ft 7 in (2.01 m), he plays the point forward position.

== College career ==
Prior to Loyola University, Schilb was a postgraduate student at Brewster Academy in Wolfeboro, New Hampshire, during the 2002–2003 academic year.

A 6-foot-7-inch (201 cm) guard (during his college days), Schilb played at Loyola University Chicago, with the Loyola Ramblers, from 2003 to 2007. In 2006, he became Loyola's first player since Alfredrick Hughes in 1985 to earn Associated Press All-American honors after averaging 19.1 points, 5.2 rebounds and 3.9 assists per game. He graduated from Loyola as the school's fourth all-time leading scorer (1,879 points) and all-time leader in three-point field goals (204).

After his junior season, Schilb became an early entry candidate for the 2006 NBA draft, but he withdrew his name before the deadline so he could return for his senior year. Schilb went undrafted by any NBA teams after his senior year.

== Professional career ==
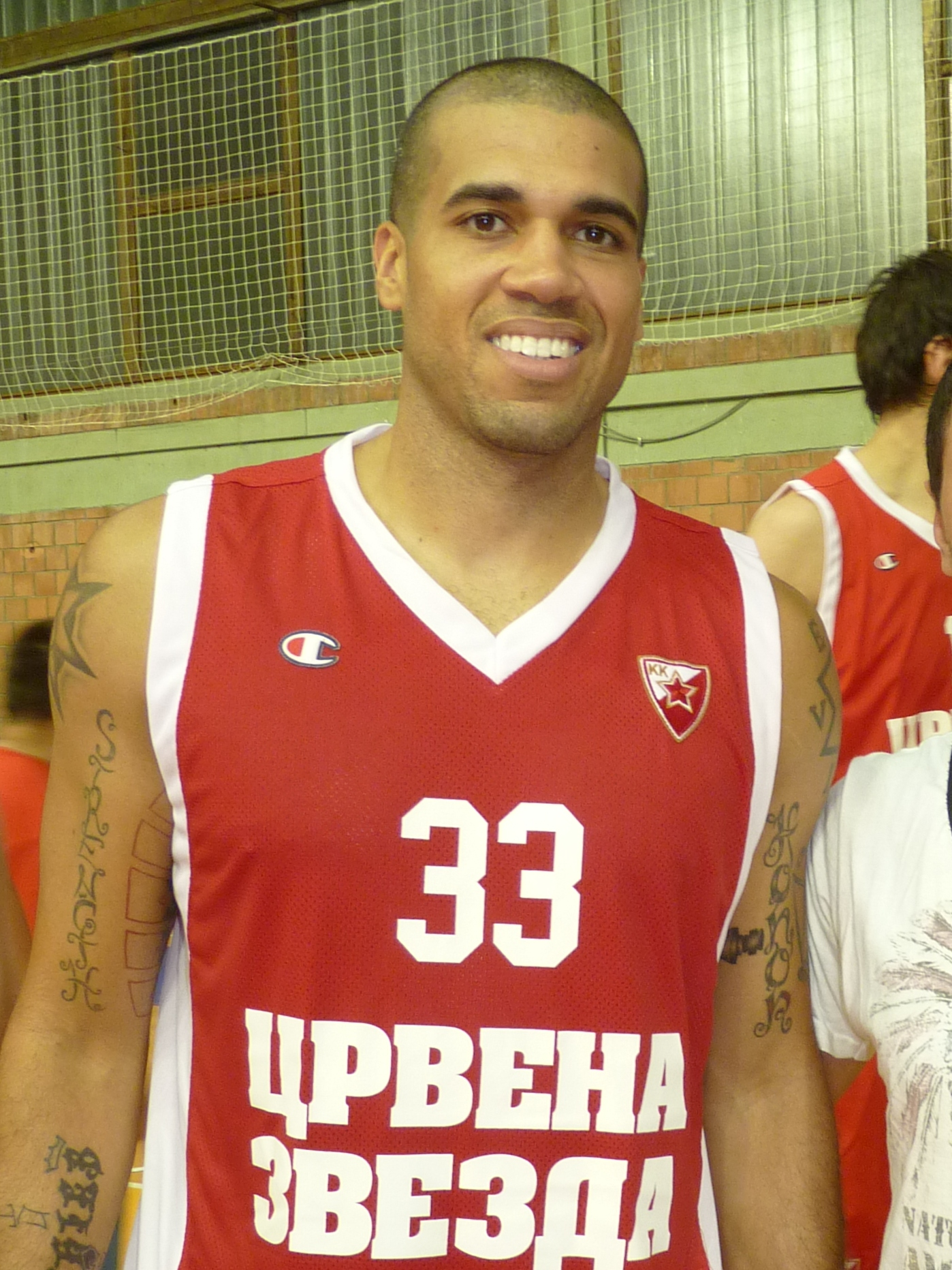
Schilb with Crvena zvezda in September 2013

Schilb signed with the French league team Élan Chalon in 2009. In his third season with the team, he was named LNB Pro A 2011–12 season French League Foreign Player MVP. In the final, he helped his team win the title with 20 points, 10 assists and 5 rebounds, earning the Final MVP award.

On August 2, 2012, Schilb extended his contract with Élan Chalon for one more season. In January 2013, Galatasaray offered 300,000 euros for a buyout of his contract and a salary that was three times larger than his current one, but Schlib turned down the offer. In his first EuroLeague season, he averaged 15.5 points, 4.6 rebounds and 4 assists over 10 games.

On June 23, 2013, he signed a three-year contract with the Serbian team Crvena zvezda. On January 29, 2014, he officially parted ways with Crvena zvezda. The next day, he returned to France and signed with Paris-Levallois. On April 15, 2015, he parted ways with Paris.

On July 23, 2015, Schilb signed a one-year deal with the Turkish club Galatasaray. On July 28, 2016, he re-signed with Galatasaray for one more season.

On September 30, 2017, Schilb signed with Spanish club Real Betis Energía Plus.

== Career statistics ==
Legend
GP	Games played	GS	Games started	MPG	Minutes per game
FG%	Field-goal percentage	3P%	3-point field-goal percentage	FT%	Free-throw percentage
RPG	Rebounds per game	APG	Assists per game	SPG	Steals per game
BPG	Blocks per game	PPG	Points per game	PIR	Performance index rating
**Bold**	Career high

=== EuroLeague ===
Year	Team	GP	GS	MPG	FG%	3P%	FT%	RPG	APG	SPG	BPG	PPG	PIR
2012–13	Élan Chalon	10	10	**32.5**	.449	.341	.850	**4.6**	**4.0**	**1.3**	**.3**	**15.5**	**17.6**
2013–14	Crvena zvezda	10	10	28.6	.495	**.379**	.773	3.2	3.5	.7	.2	12.0	11.9
2016–17	Galatasaray	**27**	**19**	25.6	**.497**	.310	**.870**	3.9	**4.0**	.7	.1	9.3	12.0
Career		47	39	27.7	.483	.333	.835	3.9	3.9	.8	.2	11.2	13.2

== International career ==
On August 20, 2015, Schilb obtained Czech Republic citizenship and became a naturalized player for the Czech Republic national basketball team. He represented the Czech Republic at the 2019 FIBA Basketball World Cup and the 2020 Summer Olympics.
