= Eurocup Basketball 2011–12 Last 16 Group L =

Standings and Results for Group L of the Last 16 phase of the 2011–12 Eurocup basketball tournament.

== Standings ==
Key to colors
Top two places in each group advance to the Quarterfinals

	Team	Pld	W	L	PF	PA	Diff	Tie-break
1.	(Russia) Lokomotiv-Kuban	6	4	2	466	452	+14	2–0 (+18)
2.	(Lithuania) Lietuvos rytas	6	4	2	468	443	+25	0–2 (–18)
3.	(Italy) Benetton Treviso	6	3	3	447	451	–4	
4.	(Germany) Alba Berlin	6	1	5	433	468	–35	

== Fixtures and results ==
All times given below are in Central European Time.

=== Game 1 ===
17 January 2012
16:30

Report

Lokomotiv-Kuban (Russia)	81–67	(Lithuania) Lietuvos rytas
Scoring by quarter: 20–16, 20–10, 13–22, 9–14
Pts: Massey 17; Rebs: Traore 9 Asts: Three players 3		Pts: Babrauskas 17; Rebs: Valančiūnas 13; Asts: Rice 3

Olympus Arena, Krasnodar
Attendance: 4,000
Referees: Recep Ankarali (TUR), Spiros Gkontas (GRE), Oskars Lucis (LAT)

17 January 2012
20:45

Report

Benetton Basket (Italy)	72–64	(Germany) Alba Berlin
Scoring by quarter: 22–17, 22–14, 14–23, 14–10
Pts: Thomas 14; Rebs: Moldoveanu 7 Asts: Viggiano 4		Pts: Wood 18; Rebs: Francis 7 Asts: Three players 1

Palaverde, Treviso
Attendance: 2,613
Referees: Srdjan Dozai (CRO), Marcin Kowalski (POL), Haris Bijedic (BIH)

=== Game 2 ===
24 January 2012
18:10

Report

Lietuvos rytas (Lithuania)	78–69	(Italy) Benetton Basket
Scoring by quarter: 16–15, 21–15, 9–17, 32–22
Pts: Valančiūnas 17; Rebs: Valančiūnas 10; Asts: Rice 4		Pts: Viggiano 15; Rebs: Ortner, Bečirovič 5 Asts: Bečirovič 9

Siemens Arena, Vilnius
Attendance: 6,250
Referees: Grzegorz Ziemblicki (POL), Sergey Mikhaylov (RUS), Moritz Reiter (GER)

24 January 2012
20:00

Report

Alba Berlin (Germany)	79–84	(Russia) Lokomotiv-Kuban
Scoring by quarter: 21–21, 20–13, 15–21, 23–29
Pts: Allen 19; Rebs: Weaver, Taylor 7 Asts: Wood, Weaver 6		Pts: Grigoryev 17; Rebs: Massey 8 Asts: Grigoryev, Massey 3

O2 World, Berlin
Attendance: 7,735
Referees: Jose Martin (ESP), Olegs Latisevs (LAT), Ioannis Foufis (GRE)

=== Game 3 ===
31 January 2012
16:30

Report

Lokomotiv-Kuban (Russia)	70–71	(Italy) Benetton Basket
Scoring by quarter: 21–14, 22–22, 10–19, 17–16
Pts: Traore 22; Rebs: Rivers 10; Asts: Massey, Bykov 4		Pts: Thomas 22; Rebs: Goree 6 Asts: Three players 2

Olympus Arena, Krasnodar
Attendance: 3,000
Referees: Murat Biricik (TUR), Anastasios Piloidis (GRE), Petri Mantyla (FIN)

31 January 2012
18:10

Report

Lietuvos rytas (Lithuania)	86–75	(Germany) Alba Berlin
Scoring by quarter: 20–16, 20–22, 19–25, 27–12
Pts: Rašić 16; Rebs: Valančiūnas 9 Asts: Rice 6		Pts: Allen 16; Rebs: Taylor 6 Asts: Wood 4

Siemens Arena, Vilnius
Attendance: 6,850
Referees: Dani Hierrezuelo (ESP), Robert Vyklicky (CZE), Panagiotis Anastopoulos (GRE)

=== Game 4 ===
7 February 2012
20:00

Report

Alba Berlin (Germany)	62–79	(Lithuania) Lietuvos rytas
Scoring by quarter: 18–23, 13–20, 18–17, 13–19
Pts: Wood, Taylor 13; Rebs: Simonović 4 Asts: Schaffartzik, Wood 4		Pts: Seibutis 24; Rebs: Valančiūnas 7 Asts: Rašić, Seibutis 3

O2 World, Berlin
Attendance: 7,879
Referees: Jose Ramon Garcia Ortiz (ESP), Apostolos Kalpakas (SWE), Rustu Nuran (TUR)

7 February 2012
20:45

Report

Benetton Basket (Italy)	87–76	(Russia) Lokomotiv-Kuban
Scoring by quarter: 23–15, 17–23, 22–21, 25–17
Pts: Viggiano 17; Rebs: Cuccarolo 5 Asts: Bečirovič 5		Pts: Traore 26; Rebs: Traore 9 Asts: Bykov 4

Palaverde, Treviso
Attendance: 2,860
Referees: Dani Hierrezuelo (ESP), Damir Javor (SLO), Tomas Trawicki (POL)

=== Game 5 ===
21 February 2012
18:10

Report

Lietuvos rytas (Lithuania)	78–82	(Russia) Lokomotiv-Kuban
Scoring by quarter: 21–20, 21–16, 16–25, 20–21
Pts: Valančiūnas 17; Rebs: Valančiūnas 10; Asts: Rice 8		Pts: Traore 18; Rebs: Massey 10; Asts: Blakney 5

Siemens Arena, Vilnius
Attendance: 7,300
Referees: Fernando Rocha (POR), Antonio Conde (ESP), Marcin Kowalski (POL)

21 February 2012
20:00

Report

Alba Berlin (Germany)	83–74	(Italy) Benetton Basket
Scoring by quarter: 26–16, 15–18, 6–22, 36–18
Pts: Wood 22; Rebs: Wood 6 Asts: Wood 9		Pts: Bečirovič 17; Rebs: Goree 8 Asts: Viggiano, Bečirovič 4

O2 World, Berlin
Attendance: 6,184
Referees: Juan Carlos Arteaga (ESP), Renaud Geller (BEL), Oscar Perea (ESP)

=== Game 6 ===
28 February 2012
19:30

Report

Lokomotiv-Kuban (Russia)	73–70	(Germany) Alba Berlin
Scoring by quarter: 22–12, 19–22, 11–17, 21–19
Pts: Massey 23; Rebs: Massey 12; Asts: Massey 6		Pts: Wood 19; Rebs: Taylor 11; Asts: Weaver 2

Olympus Arena, Krasnodar
Attendance: 2,000
Referees: Boris Shulga (UKR), Radomir Vojinovic (MNE), Zdravko Rutesic (MNE)

28 February 2012
19:30

Report

Benetton Basket (Italy)	74–80	(Lithuania) Lietuvos rytas
Scoring by quarter: 23–22, 19–21, 17–14, 15–23
Pts: Viggiano 17; Rebs: Viggiano 5 Asts: Bulleri 4		Pts: Seibutis 20; Rebs: Valančiūnas 7 Asts: Rice 4

Palaverde, Treviso
Attendance: 2,686
Referees: Borys Ryzhyk (UKR), Miguel Angel Perez Niz (ESP), Elias Koromilas (GRE)
