= Eurocup Basketball 2011–12 Regular Season Group H =

Standings and Results for Group H of the Regular Season phase of the 2011–12 Eurocup basketball tournament.

== Standings ==
Key to colors
Top two teams advance to Last 16

	Team	Pld	W	L	PF	PA	Diff
1.	(Germany) Alba Berlin	6	5	1	485	421	+64
2.	(Montenegro) Budućnost	6	3	3	416	425	−9
3.	(Belgium) Dexia Mons-Hainaut	6	2	4	445	463	−18
4.	(Poland) Turów Zgorzelec	6	2	4	446	483	−37

== Fixtures and results ==
All times given below are in Central European Time.

=== Game 1 ===
15 November 2011
17:00

Report

KK Budućnost Podgorica (Montenegro)	75–50	(Poland) Turów Zgorzelec
Scoring by quarter: 12–7, 16–19, 26–17, 21–7
Pts: Vučević 18; Rebs: Vučević 8 Asts: Ivanović 7		Pts: Jackson 9 Rebs: Lauderdale 8 Asts: Moore 4

Morača Sports Center, Podgorica
Attendance: 940
Referees: Christos Christodoulou (GRE), Andrej Lovsyn (SLO), Jasmina Juras (SRB)

15 November 2011
20:00

Report

Dexia Mons-Hainaut (Belgium)	74–78	(Germany) Alba Berlin
Scoring by quarter: 24–17, 17–26, 10–24, 23–11
Pts: Nivins 20; Rebs: Nivins 7 Asts: Taylor 5		Pts: Wood, Weaver 17; Rebs: Francis 10; Asts: Wood, Weaver 3

Mons Arena, Mons
Attendance: 1,960
Referees: Dani Hierrezuelo (ESP), Oscar Lefwerth (SWE), Roman Kolar (SLO)

=== Game 2 ===
22 November 2011
19:00

Report

Turów Zgorzelec (Poland)	67–66	(Belgium) Dexia Mons-Hainaut
Scoring by quarter: 25–16, 15–21, 8–19, 19–10
Pts: Kickert 18; Rebs: Edwards 7 Asts: Gustas, Wysocki 5		Pts: Taylor 14; Rebs: Carter, Nivins 7 Asts: Singletary 4

Hala MOSiR, Zielona Góra^{1}
Attendance: 2,000
Referees: Dubravko Muhvic (CRO), Lahdo Sharro (SWE), Oscar Perea (ESP)

22 November 2011
20:00

Report

Alba Berlin (Germany)	86–68	(Montenegro) KK Budućnost Podgorica
Scoring by quarter: 24–13, 15–19, 21–19, 26–17
Pts: Wood 23; Rebs: Weaver 7 Asts: Wood, Taylor 4		Pts: Vitkovac 20; Rebs: Vučević, Vitkovac 4 Asts: Anderson 5

O2 World, Berlin
Attendance: 7,085
Referees: Andrej Jeršan (SLO), Sasa Maricic (SRB), Ingus Baumanis (LAT)

=== Game 3 ===
29 November 2011
20:00

Report

Dexia Mons-Hainaut (Belgium)	66–53	(Montenegro) KK Budućnost Podgorica
Scoring by quarter: 16–13, 17–10, 15–11, 18–19
Pts: Carter 15; Rebs: Taylor 8 Asts: Taylor 4		Pts: Vučević 18; Rebs: Vučević 6 Asts: four players 4

Mons Arena, Mons
Referees: J.C. Garcia Gonzalez (ESP), M. A. Perez Niz (ESP), Ademir Zurapovic (BIH)

29 November 2011
20:00

Report

Alba Berlin (Germany)	79–68	(Poland) Turów Zgorzelec
Scoring by quarter: 17–10, 17–17, 22–18, 23–23
Pts: Taylor 14; Rebs: Weaver 6 Asts: Wood 9		Pts: Kickert 16; Rebs: Edwards 7 Asts: Moore 8

O2 World, Berlin
Attendance: 8,856
Referees: Tolga Sahin (ITA), Gianluca Mattioli (ITA), Omer Esteron (ISR)

=== Game 4 ===
6 December 2011
18:30

Report

KK Budućnost Podgorica (Montenegro)	85–78	(Belgium) Dexia Mons-Hainaut
Scoring by quarter: 9–18, 18–18, 20–21, 22–12
Pts: Vučević 22; Rebs: Vučević 10; Asts: Anderson 5		Pts: Slaughter 23; Rebs: Nivins 9 Asts: Cage 4

Morača Sports Center, Podgorica
Attendance: 1,500
Referees: Andrej Lovsin (SLO), Gianluca Mattioli (ITA), Petar Obradovic (BIH)

6 December 2011
19:00

Report

Turów Zgorzelec (Poland)	91–87 (OT)	(Germany) Alba Berlin
Scoring by quarter: 12–18, 14–23, 24–20, 22–11, Overtime: 19–15
Pts: Jackson 23; Rebs: three players 8 Asts: Moore 6		Pts: Allen 21; Rebs: Allen, Francis 9 Asts: Wood 9

Hala MOSiR, Zielona Góra^{1}
Attendance: 1,000
Referees: Srdan Dozai (CRO), Oscar Lefwerth (SWE), Jasmina Juras (SRB)

=== Game 5 ===
13 December 2011
19:00

Report

Turów Zgorzelec (Poland)	73–78	(Montenegro) KK Budućnost Podgorica
Scoring by quarter: 16–24, 18–13, 17–13, 22–28
Pts: Moore 22; Rebs: Wysocki, Lauderdale 5 Asts: Cel 4		Pts: Dubljević, Anderson 16; Rebs: Milosevic, Vitkovac 5 Asts: Anderson 4

Hala MOSiR, Zielona Góra^{1}
Attendance: 1,000
Referees: Andrej Jersan (SLO), Robert Vyklicky (CZE), Anna Cardus (ESP)

13 December 2011
20:00

Report

Alba Berlin (Germany)	83–63	(Belgium) Dexia Mons-Hainaut
Scoring by quarter: 19–18, 17–20, 23–13, 24–12
Pts: Francis, Wood 16; Rebs: Allen 8 Asts: Wood 9		Pts: Nivins 19; Rebs: Nivins 9 Asts: Cage 3

O2 World, Berlin
Attendance: 8,190
Referees: Spiros Gkontas (GRE), Oscar Perea (ESP), Miroslav Tomov (BUL)

=== Game 6 ===
20 December 2011
20:00

Report

KK Budućnost Podgorica (Montenegro)	57–72	(Germany) Alba Berlin
Scoring by quarter: 10–20, 18–14, 18–25, 11–13
Pts: Tica, Popović 12; Rebs: three players 5 Asts: Krstović 4		Pts: Idbihi 21; Rebs: Francis 8 Asts: Wood 6

Morača Sports Center, Podgorica
Attendance: 1,500
Referees: Vicente Bulto (ESP), Carmelo Paternico (ITA), Omer Esteron (ISR)

20 December 2011
20:00

Report

Dexia Mons-Hainaut (Belgium)	98–97 (OT)	(Poland) Turów Zgorzelec
Scoring by quarter: 21–22, 11–23, 18–12, 24–17, Overtime: 24–23
Pts: Carter 24; Rebs: Carter 10; Asts: Slaughter 7		Pts: Kickert 19; Rebs: Moore 8 Asts: Moore 7

Mons Arena, Mons
Attendance: 1,160
Referees: Roberto Chiari (ITA), M. A. Perez Niz (ESP), Oliver Krause (GER)

Notes

- Note 1: PGE Turów Zgorzelec will play their home matches at Hala MOSiR, Zielona Góra as their own Centrum Sportowe did not meet Eurocup criteria.
