= Eurocup Basketball 2010–11 Last 16 Group L =

Standings and results for Group L of the last 16 phase of the 2010–11 Eurocup basketball tournament.

== Standings ==
Key to colors
Top two places in each group advance to the Quarterfinals

	Team	Pld	W	L	PF	PA	Diff	Tie-break
1.	(Italy) Benetton Basket Bwin	6	5	1	461	426	+35	1–1 (+5)
2.	(Spain) Cajasol	6	5	1	476	440	+36	1–1 (−5)
3.	(Greece) Panellinios BC	6	1	5	451	477	−26	1–1 (+10)
4.	(Germany) ALBA Berlin	6	1	5	434	479	−45	1–1 (−10)

== Fixtures and results ==
All times given below are in Central European Time.

=== Game 1 ===
18 January 2011
18:00

Report

Panellinios BC (Greece)	82–87	(Spain) Cajasol
Scoring by quarter: 24–29, 14–16, 18–12, 14–13
Pts: Francis 16; Rebs: Francis 10; Asts: Xanthopoulos 7		Pts: Bullock 23; Rebs: Kirksay 9 Asts: Three players 3

Halkiopouleio Indoor Hall, Lamia
Attendance: 800
Referees: Murat Biricik (TUR), Milija Vojinovic (SRB), Oskar Lucis (LAT)

18 January 2011
20:45

Report

Benetton Basket Bwin (Italy)	75–71	(Germany) ALBA Berlin
Scoring by quarter: 27–18, 21–17, 21–18, 9–18
Pts: Smith, Brunner 15; Rebs: Motiejūnas, Brunner 8 Asts: Marković 5		Pts: Allen 18; Rebs: Dragićević 7 Asts: Marinović 4

Palaverde, Treviso
Attendance: 2,467
Referees: Jose Ramon Garcia Ortiz (ESP), Tomas Jasevicius (LTU), Tomas Trawicki (POL)

=== Game 2 ===
25 January 2011
20:30

Report

Cajasol (Spain)	66–55	(Italy) Benetton Basket Bwin
Scoring by quarter: 21–18, 10–12, 19–16, 16–9
Pts: Davis 22; Rebs: Davis 11; Asts: Satoransky 5		Pts: Smith, Perić 8 Rebs: Marković, Perić 6 Asts: Marković 7

Palacio Municipal San Pablo, Seville
Attendance: 5,200
Referees: Grzegorz Ziemblicki (POL), Boris Shulga (UKR), Olegs Latisevs (LAT)

27 January 2011
20:00

Report

ALBA Berlin (Germany)	68–65	(Greece) Panellinios BC
Scoring by quarter: 15–19, 16–18, 19–19, 18–9
Pts: Jenkins 20; Rebs: McElroy 8 Asts: McElroy 4		Pts: Smith 24; Rebs: Francis 8 Asts: Udrih 6

O_{2} World, Berlin
Attendance: 8,872
Referees: Dani Hierrezuelo (ESP), Regis Bardera (FRA), Enrico Sabetta (ITA)

=== Game 3 ===
1 February 2011
18:00

Report

Panellinios BC (Greece)	75–83	(Italy) Benetton Basket Bwin
Scoring by quarter: 17–24, 23–30, 23–14, 12–15
Pts: Francis 29; Rebs: Francis 10; Asts: Francis 3		Pts: Smith 22; Rebs: Skinner 6 Asts: Marković 4

Halkiopouleio Indoor Hall, Lamia
Attendance: 600
Referees: Recep Ankarali (TUR), Seffi Shemmesh (ISR), Joseph Bissang (FRA)

1 February 2011
20:30

Report

Cajasol (Spain)	76–67	(Germany) ALBA Berlin
Scoring by quarter: 19–20, 16–19, 26–13, 15–13
Pts: Davis 17; Rebs: Kirksay, Davis 5 Asts: Satoransky 6		Pts: Femerling 14; Rebs: Dragićević 6 Asts: Marinović 4

Palacio Municipal San Pablo, Seville
Attendance: 4,200
Referees: Paolo Taurino (ITA), Luis Lopes (POR), Renaud Geller (BEL)

=== Game 4 ===
15 February 2011
20:00

Report

ALBA Berlin (Germany)	81–95	(Spain) Cajasol
Scoring by quarter: 18–32, 19–30, 27–23, 17–10
Pts: Allen 21; Rebs: Idbihi, Allen 5 Asts: Marinović, McElroy 5		Pts: Davis 21; Rebs: Kirksay, Davis 7 Asts: Satoransky, Davis 4

O_{2} World, Berlin
Attendance: 8,832
Referees: Andrej Jersan (SLO), Sinisa Herceg (CRO), Marius Ciulin (ROM)

15 February 2011
20:45

Report

Benetton Basket Bwin (Italy)	82–72	(Greece) Panellinios BC
Scoring by quarter: 17–9, 23–25, 18–20, 24–18
Pts: Smith 24; Rebs: Three players 6 Asts: Marković 4		Pts: Bailey 16; Rebs: Francis 8 Asts: Xanthopoulos 4

Palaverde, Treviso
Attendance: 2,861
Referees: Sradan Dozai (CRO), Sasa Maricic (SRB), Robert Vyklicky (CZE)

=== Game 5 ===
22 February 2011
20:00

Report

ALBA Berlin (Germany)	74–82	(Italy) Benetton Basket Bwin
Scoring by quarter: 15–18, 24–20, 20–25, 15–19
Pts: Schaffartzik 18; Rebs: Dragićević, McElroy 7 Asts: Jenkins 5		Pts: Smith 35; Rebs: Smith, Motiejūnas 9 Asts: Marković 6

O_{2} World, Berlin
Attendance: 9,222
Referees: Volodymr Drabikovsky (UKR), Panagiotis Anastopoulos (GRE), Apostolos Kalpakaas (SWE)

22 February 2011
20:30

Report

Cajasol (Spain)	84–71	(Greece) Panellinios BC
Scoring by quarter: 21–17, 21–20, 26–22, 16–12
Pts: Urtasun 13; Rebs: Trigueros 7 Asts: Satoranski 4		Pts: Smith 16; Rebs: Francis 7 Asts: Xanthopoulos 3

Palacio Municipal San Pablo, Seville
Attendance: 3,200
Referees: David Chambon (FRA), Marcin Kowalski (POL), Tomas Trawicki (POL)

=== Game 6 ===
1 March 2011
18:00

Report

Panellinios BC (Greece)	86–73	(Germany) ALBA Berlin
Scoring by quarter: 23–24, 27–17, 20–16, 16–16
Pts: Smith 24; Rebs: Smith 7 Asts: Xanthopoulos, Papamakarios 5		Pts: Jenkins 18; Rebs: Idbihi 9 Asts: Jenkins, McElroy 5

Halkiopouleio Indoor Hall, Lamia
Attendance: 500
Referees: Carmelo Paternico (ITA), Nebojsa Milosevic (SRB), Haris Bijedic (BIH)

1 March 2011
20:00

Report

Benetton Basket Bwin (Italy)	84–68	(Spain) Cajasol
Scoring by quarter: 24–20, 17–11, 18–12, 25–25
Pts: Smith 20; Rebs: Skinner 17; Asts: Brunner 4		Pts: Davis 20; Rebs: Kirksay 9 Asts: Calloway 2

Palaverde, Treviso
Attendance: 0
Referees: Recep Ankarali (TUR), Eddie Viator (FRA), Robert Vyklicky (CZE)
