= Pallacanestro Treviso in international competitions =

Pallacanestro Treviso history and statistics in FIBA Europe and Euroleague Basketball (company) competitions.

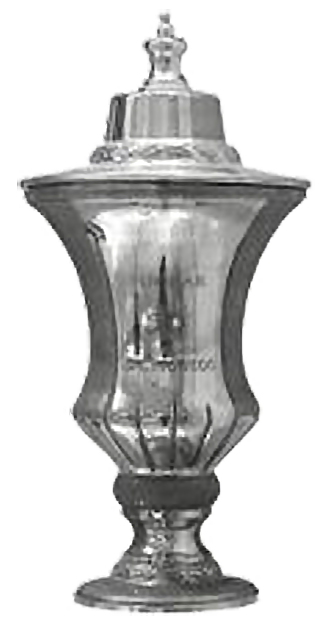
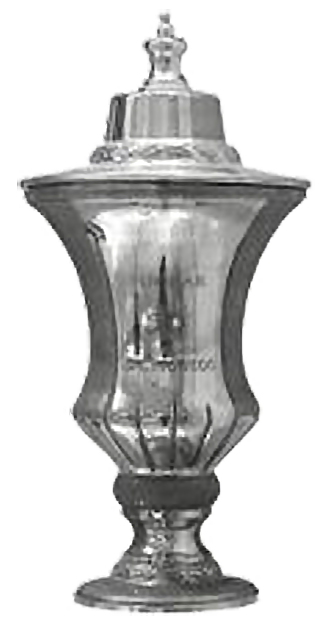

== European competitions ==
Record	Round	Opponent club			
1989–90 FIBA Korać Cup 3rd–tier
2–2	1st round	(West Germany) Charlottenburg	96–70 (a)	91–68 (h)	
2–2	2nd round	(Socialist Federal Republic of Yugoslavia) Smelt Olimpija	80–83 (h)	68–84 (a)	
1991–92 FIBA Korać Cup 3rd–tier
5–3	2nd round	(Turkey) Çukurova Üniversitesi	82–64 (a)	86–69 (h)	
5–3	Top 16	(Croatia) Zadar	96–90 (a)	81–90 (h)	
5–3	Top 16	(Spain) Taugrés	83–88 (a)	98–86 (h)	
5–3	Top 16	(Greece) Nikas Peristeri	103–66 (h)	72–93 (a)	
1992–93 FIBA European League 1st–tier
13–6	2nd round	Bye	Benetton qualified without games		
13–6	Top 16	(Croatia) Zadar	77–73 (a)	92–71 (h)	
13–6	Top 16	(Spain) Real Madrid	65–66 (h)	51–83 (a)	
13–6	Top 16	(Belgium) Racing Maes Pils Mechelen	86–84 (a)	113–95 (h)	
13–6	Top 16	(Spain) Estudiantes Caja Postal	77–60 (h)	86–85 (a)	
13–6	Top 16	(Germany) Bayer 04 Leverkusen	82–80 (a)	98–71 (h)	
13–6	Top 16	(Greece) Olympiacos	86–91 (a)	75–67 (h)	
13–6	Top 16	(France) Pau-Orthez	84–65 (h)	55–82 (a)	
13–6	QF	(Italy) Scavolini Pesaro	92–94 (a)	101–94 (h)	77–58 (h)
13–6	SF	(Greece) PAOK	79–77; April 13, Peace and Friendship Stadium, Final4 Athens		
13–6	F	(France) Limoges	55–59; April 15, Peace and Friendship Stadium, Final4 Athens		
1993–94 FIBA European League 1st–tier
9–7	2nd round	(Czech Republic) USK Praha	88–75 (a)	97–73 (h)	
9–7	Top 16	(Spain) Real Madrid	76–85 (a)	64–80 (h)	
9–7	Top 16	(Spain) FC Barcelona	93–82 (h)	68–77 (a)	
9–7	Top 16	(Belgium) Racing Maes Pils Mechelen	85–86 (a)	89–73 (h)	
9–7	Top 16	(Greece) Olympiacos	73–79 (h)	65–80 (a)	
9–7	Top 16	(France) Limoges	89–87 (a)	61–65 (h)	
9–7	Top 16	(Germany) Bayer 04 Leverkusen	70–60 (a)	83–72 (h)	
9–7	Top 16	(England) Guildford Kings	93–71 (h)	76–75 (a)	
1994–95 FIBA European Cup 2nd–tier
15–3	2nd round	(Bulgaria) Plama Pleven	87–77 (a)	110–76 (h)	
15–3	3rd round	(Cyprus) Pezoporikos Larnaca	109–91 (a)	110–49 (h)	
15–3	Top 12	(Turkey) Fenerbahçe	72–80 (a)	97–86 (h)	
15–3	Top 12	(Poland) Nobiles Włocławek	111–81 (h)	100–85 (a)	
15–3	Top 12	(Latvia) ASK Brocēni	88–83 (h)	106–95 (a)	
15–3	Top 12	(Spain) Taugrés	71–80 (a)	99–89 (h)	
15–3	Top 12	(Israel) Hapoel Tel Aviv	95–82 (a)	128–82 (h)	
15–3	SF	(France) Olympique Antibes	88–95 (h)	99–93 (a)	87–83 (a)
15–3	F	(Spain) Taugrés	94–86; March 14, Abdi İpekçi Arena, Istanbul		
1995–96 FIBA European League 1st–tier
13–6	2nd round	(Slovakia) Baník Cígeľ Prievidza	91–87 (a)	93–75 (h)	
13–6	Top 16	(Greece) Olympiacos	72–83 (a)	83–77 (h)	
13–6	Top 16	(Turkey) Ülker	92–73 (h)	83–87 (a)	
13–6	Top 16	(France) Olympique Antibes	65–73 (a)	95–84 (h)	
13–6	Top 16	(Germany) Bayer 04 Leverkusen	90–87 (h)	77–60 (a)	
13–6	Top 16	(Russia) CSKA Moscow	121–97 (h)	70–84 (a)	
13–6	Top 16	(Spain) Unicaja	72–70 (a)	85–78 (h)	
13–6	Top 16	(Greece) Iraklis Aspis	79–75 (a)	73–68 (h)	
13–6	QF	(Greece) Panathinaikos	67–70 (a)	83–69 (h)	64–65 (h)
1996–97 FIBA Korać Cup 3rd–tier
10–4	1st round	Bye	Benetton qualified without games		
10–4	2nd round	(Croatia) Zrinjevac	115–84 (h)	78–83 (a)	
10–4	2nd round	(Slovenia) Rogaška	106–80 (a)	124–87 (h)	
10–4	2nd round	(Lithuania) Olimpas Plungė	115–90 (h)	86–71 (a)	
10–4	3rd round	(France) Dijon	87–62 (a)	89–87 (h)	
10–4	Top 16	(Greece) PAOK	78–85 (a)	84–60 (h)	
10–4	QF	(Italy) Telemarket Roma	63–73 (a)	91–62 (h)	
10–4	SF	(Greece) Aris	73–77 (a)	87–86 (h)	
1997–98 FIBA EuroLeague 1st–tier
17–6	Group stage 1	(Spain) Estudiantes	73–58 (a)	98–58 (h)	
17–6	Group stage 1	(Portugal) Porto	76–67 (h)	91–84 (a)	
17–6	Group stage 1	(Turkey) Türk Telekom	71–66 (h)	84–67 (a)	
17–6	Group stage 1	(Greece) PAOK	62–65 (a)	65–57 (h)	
17–6	Group stage 1	(Croatia) Split	77–72 (a)	85–70 (h)	
17–6	Group stage 2	(France) Limoges	68–69 (a)	96–70 (h)	
17–6	Group stage 2	(Spain) Real Madrid	65–56 (h)	54–82 (a)	
17–6	Group stage 2	(Russia) CSKA Moscow	65–82 (a)	83–77 (h)	
17–6	Top 16	(Slovenia) Union Olimpija	81–79 (h)	70–61 (a)	– (h)
17–6	QF	(Turkey) Efes Pilsen	67–57 (h)	58–59 (a)	76–68 (h)
17–6	SF	(Greece) AEK	66–69; April 21, Palau Sant Jordi, Final4 Barcelona		
17–6	3rd place game	(Federal Republic of Yugoslavia) Partizan	96–89; April 23, Palau Sant Jordi, Final4 Barcelona		
1998–99 FIBA Saporta Cup 2nd–tier
17–1 +1 draw	1st round	(Austria) Stahlbau Oberwart	84–68 (a)	77–70 (h)	
17–1 +1 draw	1st round	(Netherlands) Hans Verkerk Keukens	82–45 (h)	80–63 (a)	
17–1 +1 draw	1st round	(Russia) UNICS	74–61 (h)	95–76 (a)	
17–1 +1 draw	1st round	(Portugal) Ovarense Aerosoles	78–71 (a)	81–57 (h)	
17–1 +1 draw	1st round	(Ukraine) BIPA-Moda Odesa	96–71 (h)	75–62 (a)	
17–1 +1 draw	2nd round	(Poland) Mazowzanka	62–70 (a)	83–60 (h)	
17–1 +1 draw	Top 16	(Belgium) Spirou	70–66 (a)	75–61 (h)	
17–1 +1 draw	QF	(Federal Republic of Yugoslavia) Partizan	90–77 (h)	73–73 (a)	
17–1 +1 draw	SF	(Federal Republic of Yugoslavia) Budućnost	76–60 (h)	20–00 (a)	
17–1 +1 draw	F	(Spain) Pamesa Valencia	64–60; April 13, Pabellón Príncipe Felipe, Zaragoza		
1999–00 FIBA EuroLeague 1st–tier
9–9	Group stage 1	(France) Cholet	73–64 (a)	73–57 (h)	
9–9	Group stage 1	(Spain) FC Barcelona	51–69 (a)	68–72 (h)	
9–9	Group stage 1	(Federal Republic of Yugoslavia) Crvena Zvezda	88–63 (h)	70–60 (a)	
9–9	Group stage 1	(Greece) PAOK	69–66 (h)	72–66 (a)	
9–9	Group stage 1	(Russia) CSKA Moscow	75–77 (a)	61–81 (h)	
9–9	Group stage 2	(Germany) Alba Berlin	76–66 (a)	86–78 (h)	
9–9	Group stage 2	(Lithuania) Žalgiris	88–75 (h)	75–82 (a)	
9–9	Group stage 2	(Turkey) Tofaş	65–86 (a)	66–77 (h)	
9–9	Top 16	(Italy) Paf Wennington Bologna	73–82 (a)	61–77 (h)	– (a)
2000–01 Euroleague 1st–tier
9–6	Regular season	(Slovenia) Union Olimpija	69–71 (h)	74–78 (a)	
9–6	Regular season	(Greece) Olympiacos	73–82 (a)	95–87 (h)	
9–6	Regular season	(Israel) Hapoel Jerusalem	78–71 (h)	104–79 (a)	
9–6	Regular season	(Spain) Real Madrid	75–64 (a)	87–88 (h)	
9–6	Regular season	(Portugal) Ovarense Aerosoles	106–81 (h)	86–76 (a)	
9–6	Top 16	(Spain) FC Barcelona	86–85 (a)	99–82 (h)	– (a)
9–6	QF	(Greece) AEK	89–97 (a)	90–74 (h)	56–71 (a)
2001–02 Euroleague 1st–tier
15–6	Regular season	(Spain) Unicaja	98–94 (h)	68–67 (a)	
15–6	Regular season	(Turkey) Efes Pilsen	78–87 (a)	88–86 (h)	
15–6	Regular season	(Belgium) Spirou	86–78 (h)	83–76 (a)	
15–6	Regular season	(Germany) Alba Berlin	83–89 (a)	100–71 (h)	
15–6	Regular season	(Israel) Maccabi Tel Aviv	87–83 (h)	74–80 (a)	
15–6	Regular season	(Poland) Śląsk Wrocław	88–72 (h)	93–91 (a)	
15–6	Regular season	(Greece) Olympiacos	91–87 (a)	89–81 (h)	
15–6	Top 16	(Italy) Scavolini Pesaro	94–66 (h)	98–101 (a)	
15–6	Top 16	(Italy) Skipper Bologna	96–90 (h)	86–73 (a)	
15–6	Top 16	(Spain) FC Barcelona	75–76 (a)	89–75 (h)	
15–6	SF	(Italy) Kinder Bologna	82–90; May 3, PalaMalaguti, Final4 Bologna		
15–6	3rd place game	Bye	Benetton ranked 3rd without game		
2002–03 Euroleague 1st–tier
18–4	Regular season	(France) Pau-Orthez	94–73 (h)	93–88 (a)	
18–4	Regular season	(Turkey) Efes Pilsen	83–84 (a)	87–75 (h)	
18–4	Regular season	(Germany) Alba Berlin	78–75 (a)	107–81 (h)	
18–4	Regular season	(Croatia) Cibona VIP	96–82 (h)	100–71 (a)	
18–4	Regular season	(Spain) FC Barcelona	85–86 (a)	94–82 (h)	
18–4	Regular season	(Italy) Skipper Bologna	95–80 (h)	75–82 (a)	
18–4	Regular season	(Greece) AEK	94–90 (a)	72–59 (h)	
18–4	Top 16	(Spain) TAU Cerámica	81–68 (h)	84–75 (a)	
18–4	Top 16	(Italy) Virtus Bologna	82–70 (a)	98–76 (h)	
18–4	Top 16	(Israel) Maccabi Tel Aviv	93–80 (h)	84–83 (a)	
18–4	SF	(Italy) Montepaschi Siena	65–62; May 9, Palau Sant Jordi, Final4 Barcelona		
18–4	F	(Spain) FC Barcelona	65–76; May 11, Palau Sant Jordi, Final4 Barcelona		
2003–04 Euroleague 1st–tier
14–6	Regular season	(Spain) Pamesa Valencia	64–89 (a)	90–72 (h)	
14–6	Regular season	(Spain) TAU Cerámica	92–99 (h)	81–88 (a)	
14–6	Regular season	(Turkey) Efes Pilsen	89–78 (a)	66–79 (h)	
14–6	Regular season	(France) Adecco ASVEL	80–59 (h)	87–74 (a)	
14–6	Regular season	(Greece) Olympiacos	80–75 (h)	102–89 (a)	
14–6	Regular season	(Germany) Alba Berlin	86–70 (a)	91–65 (h)	
14–6	Regular season	(Poland) Idea Śląsk Wrocław	98–56 (h)	77–72 (a)	
14–6	Top 16	(Greece) Panathinaikos	75–82 (a)	111–101 (h)	
14–6	Top 16	(Spain) FC Barcelona	77–67 (a)	88–72 (h)	
14–6	Top 16	(Italy) Montepaschi Siena	95–92 (h)	64–80 (a)	
2004–05 Euroleague 1st–tier
12–10	Regular season	(Russia) CSKA Moscow	79–80 (a)	72–80 (h)	
12–10	Regular season	(Germany) Opel Skyliners	93–60 (h)	77–58 (a)	
12–10	Regular season	(Greece) Panathinaikos	83–77 (h)	71–80 (a)	
12–10	Regular season	(Spain) TAU Cerámica	76–73 (a)	75–63 (h)	
12–10	Regular season	(Turkey) Ülker	50–65 (h)	69–62 (a)	
12–10	Regular season	(France) Pau-Orthez	72–79 (a)	91–73 (h)	
12–10	Regular season	(Spain) Unicaja	72–62 (h)	59–74 (a)	
12–10	Top 16	(Greece) AEK	75–83 (a)	85–65 (h)	
12–10	Top 16	(Poland) Prokom Trefl Sopot	89–75 (h)	85–51 (a)	
12–10	Top 16	(Turkey) Efes Pilsen	43–52 (a)	70–59 (h)	
12–10	QF	(Spain) TAU Cerámica	59–98 (h)	64–66 (a)	– (h)
2005–06 Euroleague 1st–tier
11–9	Regular season	(Germany) CHP Bamberg	76–68 (h)	85–92 (a)	
11–9	Regular season	(France) Strasbourg	78–76 (a)	83–78 (h)	
11–9	Regular season	(Italy) Climamio Bologna	94–84 (h)	65–84 (a)	
11–9	Regular season	(Lithuania) Žalgiris	70–88 (a)	82–76 (h)	
11–9	Regular season	(Spain) TAU Cerámica	92–96 (h)	73–91 (a)	
11–9	Regular season	(Greece) AEK	83–57 (a)	103–83 (h)	
11–9	Regular season	(Slovenia) Union Olimpija	81–66 (h)	77–95 (a)	
11–9	Top 16	(Turkey) Efes Pilsen	68–80 (a)	94–87 (h)	
11–9	Top 16	(Greece) Panathinaikos	76–69 (h)	70–81 (a)	
11–9	Top 16	(Croatia) Cibona VIP	80–91 (a)	88–80 (h)	
2006–07 Euroleague 1st–tier
11–9	Regular season	(Lithuania) Žalgiris	95–82 (h)	86–76 (a)	
11–9	Regular season	(Spain) Winterthur FC Barcelona	69–82 (a)	68–67 (h)	
11–9	Regular season	(Turkey) Fenerbahçe Ülker	93–83 (h)	58–70 (a)	
11–9	Regular season	(Russia) CSKA Moscow	67–83 (a)	60–68 (h)	
11–9	Regular season	(Greece) Aris TT Bank	64–42 (h)	60–65 (a)	
11–9	Regular season	(France) Pau-Orthez	86–73 (a)	87–66 (h)	
11–9	Regular season	(Italy) Eldo Napoli	64–70 (h)	64–62 (a)	
11–9	Top 16	(Spain) Unicaja	61–75 (a)	76–79 (h)	
11–9	Top 16	(Russia) Dynamo Moscow	74–55 (h)	65–68 (a)	
11–9	Top 16	(Greece) Aris TT Bank	80–79 (a)	83–72 (h)	
2007–08 ULEB Cup 2nd–tier
7–5	Regular season	(Ukraine) Kyiv	73–77 (h)	89–73 (a)	
7–5	Regular season	(France) Pau-Orthez	84–89 (a)	88–60 (h)	
7–5	Regular season	(Bulgaria) Lukoil Academic	89–82 (h)	93–90 (a)	
7–5	Regular season	(Germany) Artland Dragons	79–84 (a)	82–64 (h)	
7–5	Regular season	(Latvia) ASK Riga	73–63 (h)	83–80 (a)	
7–5	Top 32	(Serbia) Crvena Zvezda	71–81 (a)	82–83 (h)	
2008–09 Eurocup 2nd–tier
9–4	Regular season	(Turkey) Beşiktaş Cola Turka	77–72 (a)	80–89 (h)	
9–4	Regular season	(Russia) Khimki	77–59 (h)	71–80 (a)	
9–4	Regular season	(France) Le Havre	91–67 (h)	82–76 (a)	
9–4	Top 16	(Russia) UNICS	68–66 (h)	59–81 (a)	
9–4	Top 16	(Croatia) Zadar	84–76 (a)	94–81 (h)	
9–4	Top 16	(Turkey) Türk Telekom	99–67 (a)	89–87 (h)	
9–4	QF	(Lithuania) Lietuvos Rytas	79–85; April 2, Pala Alpitour, Final8 Turin		
2009–10 Euroleague 1st–tier
2–2	1st round	(Latvia) Ventspils	73–78 (a)	88–76 (h)	
2–2	2nd round	(France) Entente Orléanaise	73–82 (h)	82–80 (a)	
2009–10 Eurocup 2nd–tier
6–6	Regular season	(France) Cholet	71–70 (a)	81–80 (h)	
6–6	Regular season	(Serbia) Crvena Zvezda	71–78 (h)	83–104 (a)	
6–6	Regular season	(Russia) Dynamo Moscow	86–74 (a)	102–69 (h)	
6–6	Top 16	(Spain) Bizkaia Bilbao	69–76 (h)	72–68 (a)	
6–6	Top 16	(Germany) Brose Baskets	63–73 (a)	86–70 (h)	
6–6	Top 16	(Greece) Panellinios	79–88 (a)	81–85 (h)	
2010–11 Eurocup 2nd–tier
14–3 +1 draw	Preliminary round	(Cyprus) APOEL	97–55 (a)	84–63 (h)	
14–3 +1 draw	Regular season	(France) Chorale Roanne	67–61 (h)	84–79 (a)	
14–3 +1 draw	Regular season	(Greece) PAOK	67–62 (a)	77–69 (h)	
14–3 +1 draw	Regular season	(Spain) Asefa Estudiantes	80–71 (a)	79–72 (h)	
14–3 +1 draw	Top 16	(Germany) Alba Berlin	75–71 (h)	82–74 (a)	
14–3 +1 draw	Top 16	(Spain) Cajasol	55–66 (a)	84–68 (h)	
14–3 +1 draw	Top 16	(Greece) Panellinios	83–75 (a)	82–72 (h)	
14–3 +1 draw	QF	(Germany) Göttingen	66–66 (a)	84–62 (h)	
14–3 +1 draw	SF	(Spain) Cajasol	63–75; April 16, Palaverde, Final4 Treviso		
14–3 +1 draw	3rd place game	(Croatia) Cedevita	57–59; April 18, Palaverde, Final4 Treviso		
2011–12 Eurocup 2nd–tier
6–6	Regular season	(Germany) Bayern Munich	62–72 (a)	92–66 (h)	
6–6	Regular season	(Russia) Spartak Saint Petersburg	78–87 (h)	77–97 (a)	
6–6	Regular season	(Croatia) Cedevita	87–86 (a)	82–68 (h)	
6–6	Top 16	(Germany) Alba Berlin	72–64 (h)	74–83 (a)	
6–6	Top 16	(Lithuania) Lietuvos Rytas	69–78 (a)	74–80 (h)	
6–6	Top 16	(Russia) Lokomotiv Kuban	71–70 (a)	87–76 (h)	

== Worldwide competitions ==
Record	Round	Opponent club	
1997 McDonald's Championship
1–1	Preliminary round	(Argentina) Atenas	78–87; October 16, Palais Omnisports de Paris-Bercy, Paris
1–1	5th place game	(Spain) FC Barcelona	106–103; October 18, Palais Omnisports de Paris-Bercy, Paris
