= 2014–15 EuroChallenge Group D =

Sports competition

Group D of the 2014–15 EuroChallenge consisted of BC Avtodor Saratov, BC Astana, Tofas S.K., and CSM Oradea. Play began on 4 November and ended on 16 December 2014.

== Teams ==
Draw seed	Team	City	Country	Last appearance	2013–14			Arena	Capacity
Draw seed	Team	City	Country	Last appearance	League	Pos.	Playoffs	Arena	Capacity
I	Tofaş	Bursa	Turkey	2013–14	TBL	8th	QF	Bursa Atatürk Sport Hall	3,500
II	CSM Oradea	Oradea	Romania	2013–14	Liga națională	2nd	RU	Arena Antonio Alexe	2,000
III	Avtodor Saratov	Saratov	Russia	—	Russian Super League	1st	C	FOK Zvezdny	2,500
IV	BC Astana	Astana	Kazakhstan	—	NBL	1st	C	Saryarka Velodrome	9,270

== Standings ==
Pos	Team	Pld	W	L	PF	PA	PD	Pts	AVT	AST	TOF	ORA
1	(Russia) Avtodor Saratov (Q)	6	5	1	530	438	+92	11 (Note: Head-to-head: 1–1 (+6))		83–75	80–75	92–73
2	(Kazakhstan) Astana (Q)	6	5	1	492	461	+31	11 (Note: Head-to-head: 1–1 (–6))	75–73		73–65	80–64
3	(Turkey) Tofaş	6	2	4	469	504	−35	8	66–101	102–106		84–75
4	(Romania) CSM Oradea	6	0	6	429	517	−88	6	74–101	74–83	69–77	

(Q) Qualify for Top 16

== Results ==
=== Round 1 ===
4 November 2014

Boxscore

BC Astana (Kazakhstan)	80–64	(Romania) CSM Oradea
Scoring by quarter: 22–14, 15–13, 29–12, 14–25
Pts: J'Covan Brown 15; Rebs: Luksa Andric 8 Asts: Anatoliy Kolesnikov 4		Pts: Ante Krapic 23; Rebs: Ante Krapic 6 Asts: Hatten, Popescu 5

Astana, Kazakhstan
Attendance: 800

4 November 2014

Avtodor Saratov (Russia)	80–75	(Turkey) Tofaş
Scoring by quarter: 19–20, 18–20, 27–10, 16–25
Pts: Courtney Fortson 24; Rebs: Travis Peterson 9 Asts: Courtney Fortson 11		Pts: DaShaun Wood 20; Rebs: Andres Smith 9 Asts: DaShaun Wood 5

=== Round 2 ===
11 November 2014

Boxscore

CSM Oradea (Romania)	74–101	(Russia) Avtodor Saratov

Oradea, Romania
Attendance: 1,500

11 November 2014

Boxscore

Tofaş (Turkey)	102–106 (OT)	(Kazakhstan) BC Astana
Pts: Lamar Patterson 27; Rebs: Chinemelu Elonu 11; Asts: Dashaun Wood 5		Pts: J’Covan Brown 34; Rebs: Mahalbasic & Brown 7 Asts: Jerry Johnson 11

Bursa, Turkey
Attendance: 650

=== Round 3 ===
18 November 2014

CSM Oradea (Romania)	69–77	(Turkey) Tofaş

19 November 2014

Avtodor Saratov (Russia)	83–75	(Kazakhstan) BC Astana

=== Round 4 ===
2 December 2014

Tofaş (Turkey)	66–101	(Russia) Avtodor Saratov

2 December 2014

CSM Oradea (Romania)	74–83	(Kazakhstan) BC Astana

=== Round 5 ===
9 December 2014

BC Astana (Kazakhstan)	73–65	(Turkey) Tofaş

9 December 2014

Avtodor Saratov (Russia)	92–73	(Romania) CSM Oradea

=== Round 6 ===
16 December 2014

BC Astana (Kazakhstan)	75–73	(Russia) Avtodor Saratov

16 December 2014

Tofaş (Turkey)	84–75	(Romania) CSM Oradea
