= LaMont Weaver =

American basketball player & coach

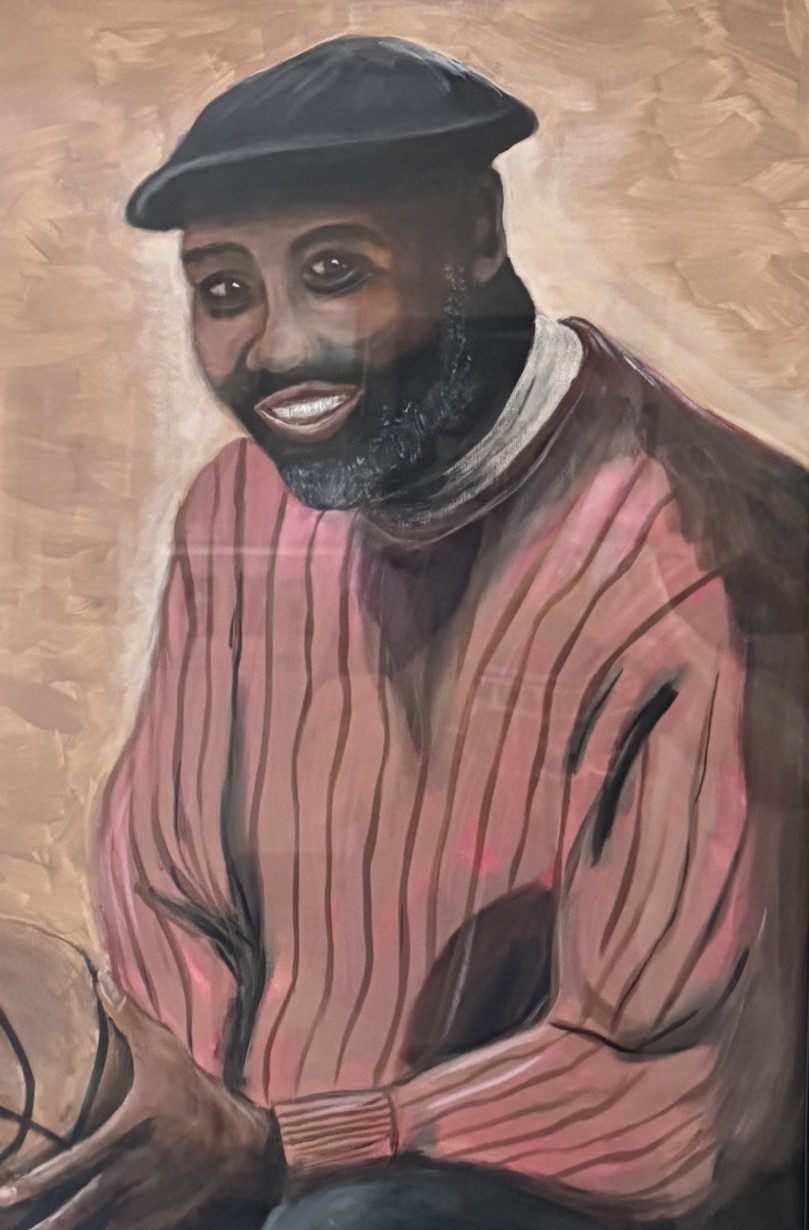
- LaMont Weaver

Biographical details
- Born: April 5, 1952 (age 74); Beloit, WI
- Education: UW-Madison

Playing career
- 1971–1974: UW Badgers
- Position: Guard

Coaching career (HC unless noted)
- 1974–1976: UW Madison (freshmen coach)
- 1976–1980: UW-River Falls
- 1980–1993: UW-Whitewater (assistant)

Cranston LaMont Weaver is a retired American college basketball coach and former college basketball player. He was the men's freshmen coach for the Wisconsin Badgers (1974 to 1976) under John Powless and the head men's basketball coach at UW-River Falls for the better part of 4 seasons (1976 to 1980), taking over after Newman Benson early resigned early in the 1976–77 season. He finished his coaching career as the assistant to Dave "Augie" Vander Meulen at UW-Whitewater for 13 seasons (1980 through 1993).

== Early life and playing career ==
LaMont was born and raised in Beloit, WI. His parents Robert and Minnie Weaver raised him and his four siblings Frank, Robert Jr. (played basketball at UW-Stout), Amara, and Wynn. LaMont attended Beloit public schools, including Beloit Memorial High School, where he starred in basketball. The Purple Knights enjoyed great success in Weaver's 3 seasons on varsity, losing the state championship game 63–51 to Manitowoc in 1968, completing a perfect 26–0 season by defeating Neenah 80–79 in double overtime in 1969 (see "The Shot" below), and losing in the sectional final to Madison West during LaMont's senior year in 1970. Weaver earned 1st team all Big Eight honors as a junior and a senior and 1st team all-state honors as a senior.

Weaver was recruited by several division I programs and accepted a basketball scholarship to attend UW-Madison. He played 68 games during his 3 years on varsity from 1971 to 1974 (freshmen were not eligible to play varsity per NCAA rules at that time), averaging 6.6 points per game. He graduated from UW-Madison in 1974 with a degree in Elementary Education and Afro-American Studies.

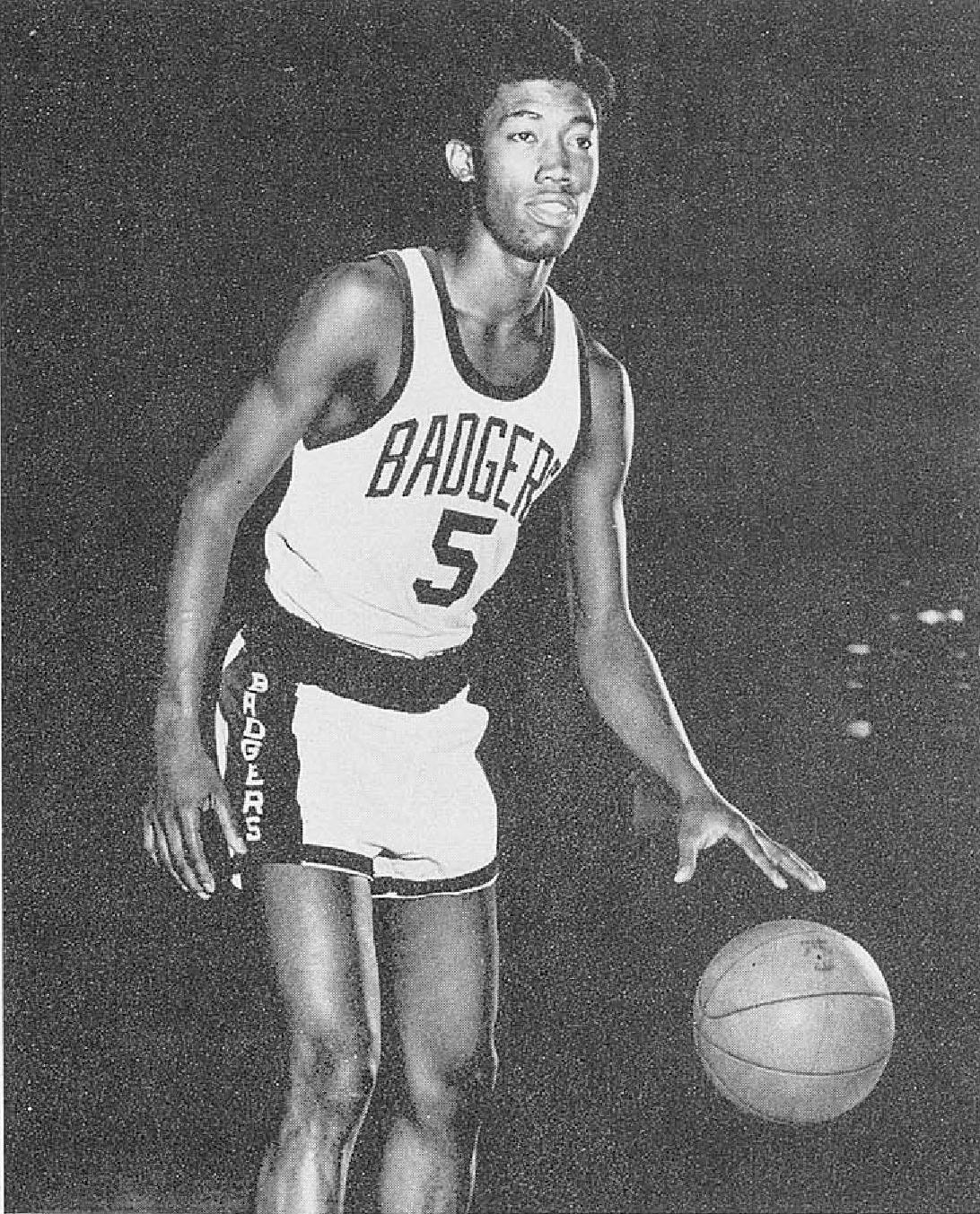
LaMont Weaver, #5, UW-Badgers

== Coaching career ==
Years	Number of Seasons	School	Role
1974–1976	2	UW-Madison	Freshmen Coach
1976–1980	4	UW-River Falls	Head Coach
1980–1993	13	UW-Whitewater	Assistant Coach

During Weaver's time at UW-River Falls he earned his master's degree in Guidance and Counselling.

During Weaver's time as Dave Vander Meulen's assistant coach at Whitewater, the Warhawks had a record of 272–94, 13 straight winning seasons, 3 final four appearances, and 2 NCAA Division III national championships (1984 and 1989). He was inducted into the UW-Whitewater Athletic Hall of Fame in 2016.

== "The Shot" ==
In the WIAA Class A final in 1969, undefeated Beloit Memorial trailed Neenah with 2 seconds left, 70–68. Beloit had the ball out on the baseline after a timeout had been called following Neenah's go-ahead score. The Purple Knights ran a play they had worked on in practice: Dan Wohlfert threw an inbound pass to Weaver who was moving right to left near half-court. Weaver was to loft the ball toward the Beloit basket, and center Bruce Brown would tip the ball in. However, Weaver's 55-foot heave banked off the glass and went in, sending the game into overtime. Weaver's two free throws with 36 seconds left in the 2nd overtime gave Beloit the winning margin, and Weaver finished the game with 25 points. However, it is "The Shot" that lives on in Wisconsin state tournament, and all of Wisconsin basketball, history.

LaMont has met people and developed many relationships and friendships as a result of The Shot. Special among those relationships is the friendship LaMont shared with Wilbur McClyman of Wisconsin Rapids. McClyman wrote LaMont asking for an autographed picture. LaMont sent McClyman the picture, and slowly, through letters, phone calls, and visits, the relationship that began with a 61-year-old white man from Wisconsin Rapids reaching out to a not yet 17-year-old black teenager from Beloit blossomed into a 25-year friendship that included yearly visits with attending each other's church services and sharing dinners.

== Personal life ==
Besides coaching basketball, Weaver served as the Director of Academic Standards at UW-Whitewater for over 30 years, retiring in the early 2010s. Weaver married Jean Wilson on December 18, 1976. The Weavers have 3 children: Cranston LaMont Weaver II (Monte), former NBA player Kyle Weaver, and Shelsi Weaver. All three Weaver children attended Beloit Memorial High School like their father. Kyle attended Washington State University (playing basketball for his dad's former Wisconsin State University Conference rival Dick Bennett and his son Tony) before his professional career.

LaMont is enjoying retirement in Beloit with his wife, Jean.
