= Augie Vander Meulen =

American basketball player

Personal information
- Born: November 6, 1909 Chicago, Illinois, U.S.
- Died: December 2, 1993 (aged 84)
- Listed height: 6 ft 4 in (1.93 m)
- Listed weight: 175 lb (79 kg)

Career information
- College: Carroll (1929–1932)
- Position: Center
- Number: 10

Career history
- 1933–1934: Schuessler A.C.
- 1934–1938: Oshkosh All-Stars

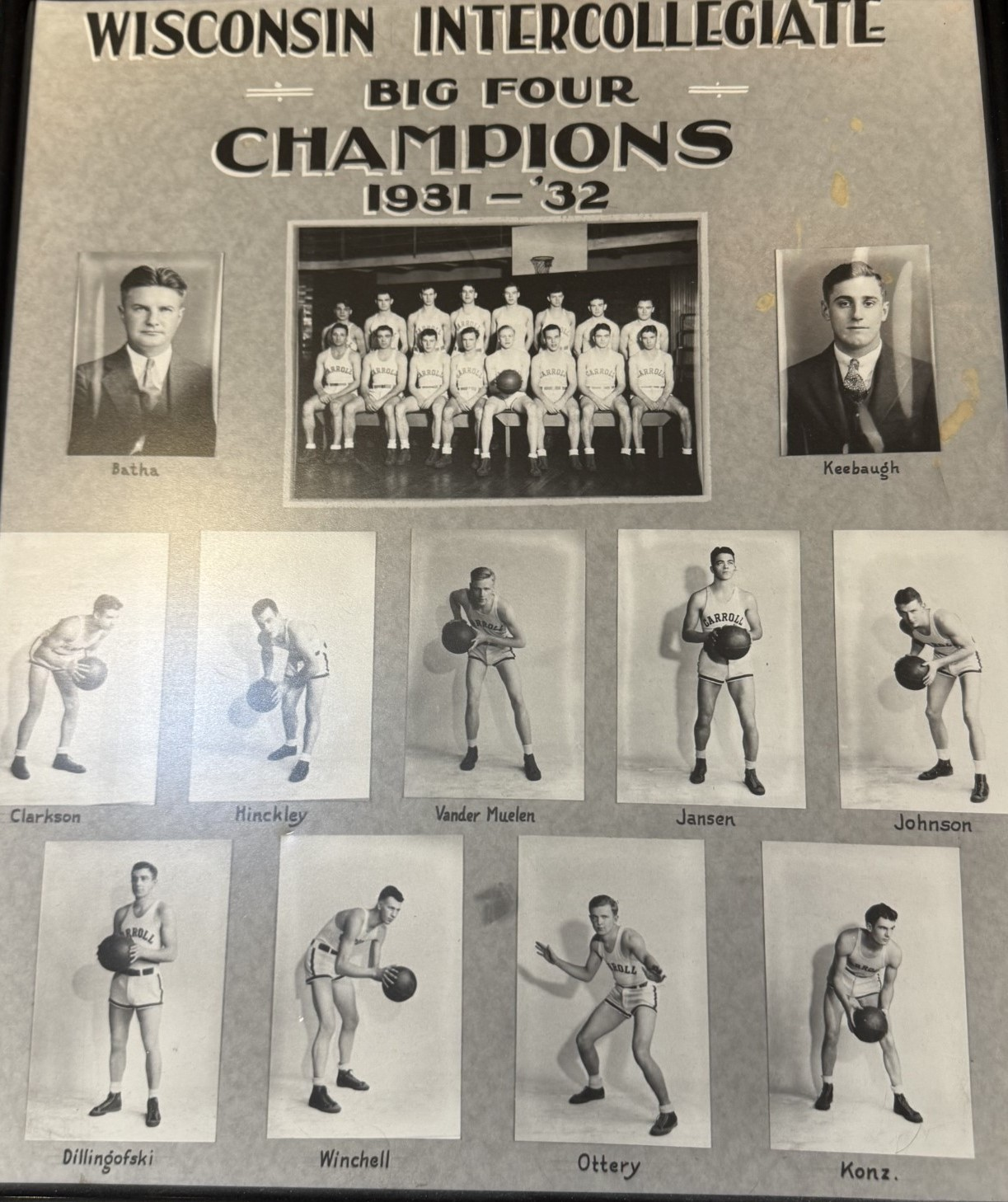
Carroll College 1932 Men's Basketball

Augie Vander Meulen (November 6, 1909 – December 2, 1993) was an American professional basketball player. Vander Meulen played in the National Basketball League for the Oshkosh All-Stars.

Augie Vander Meulen's son, Dave "Augie" Vander Meulen, was a successful college basketball coach.
