= Dave Vander Meulen =

American basketball coach

Dave "Augie" Vander Meulen
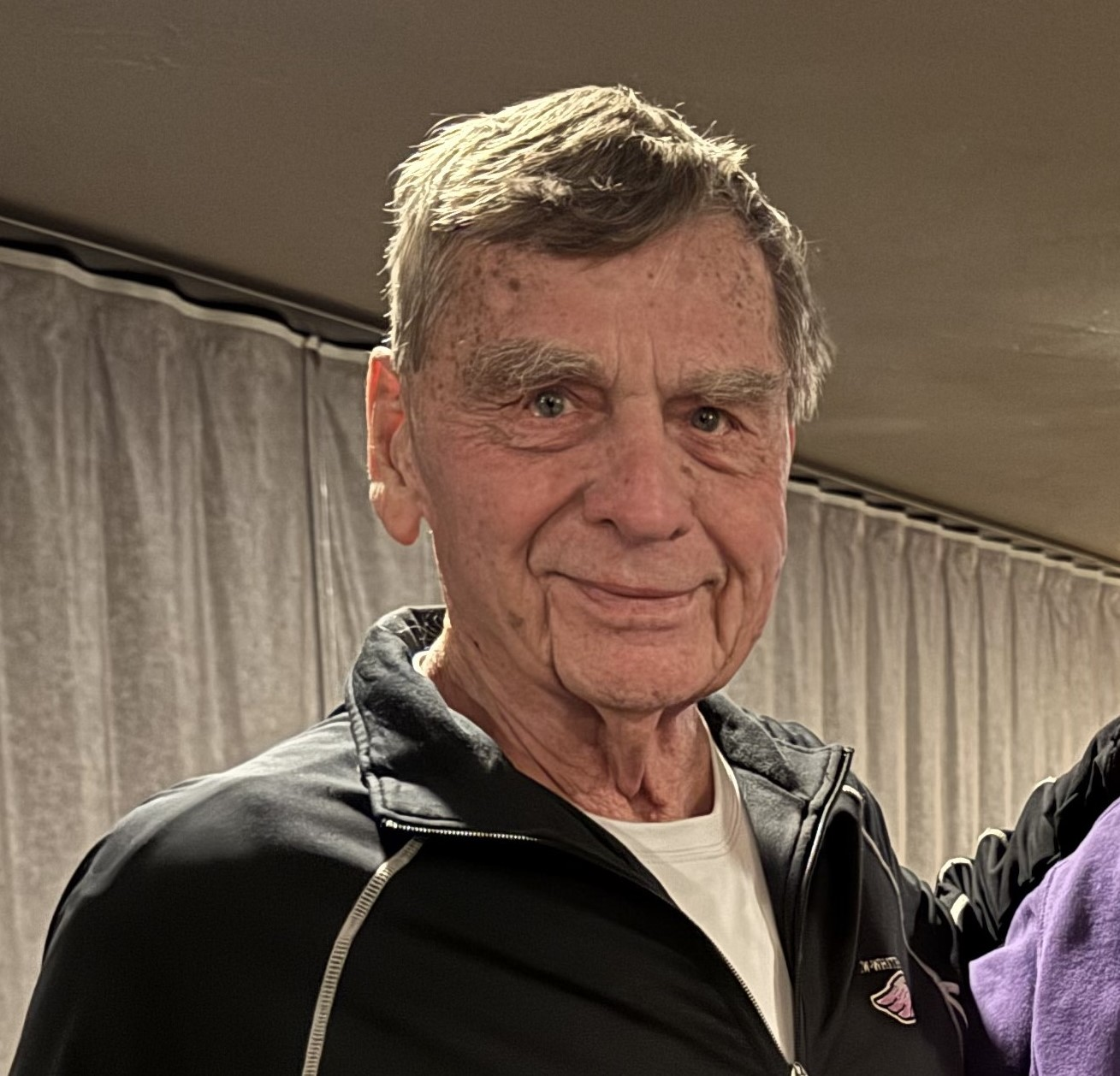
- Vander Meulen in 2025

Biographical details
- Born: January 7, 1939 (age 87); Madison, Wisconsin, U.S.
- Education: University of Wisconsin

Playing career
- 1958 to 1961: Wisconsin Badgers
- Position: Guard

Coaching career (HC unless noted)
- 1969–1976: UW-Madison (assistant)
- 1976–1978: North Dakota State (assistant)
- 1978–2001: UW-Whitewater

Head coaching record
- Overall: 440–182

Accomplishments and honors

Championships
- 1984 and 1989 NCAA Division III WSUC co-champion in 1984 and 1989; WIAC co-champion in 2001

Awards
- National Association of Basketball Coaches NCAA Division III Coach of the Year in 1984 and 1989. WSUC Men's Basketball Coach of the Year in 1984, 1989, 1994, 1997. WIAC Men's Basketball Coach of the Year in 2001.

Dave "Augie" Vander Meulen is an American retired college basketball coach and former basketball player who coached the University of Wisconsin-Whitewater Warhawks for 23 seasons, from 1978–79 through 2000–01. He accumulated a 440–182 record (.707 winning percentage) and led the Warhawks to NCAA Division III championships in 1984 and 1989, as well as three conference titles. The 1984 national championship was the first team national title of the twenty-one in school history. His 440 victories rank second on the WIAC's all-time list.

Vander Meulen was the National Association of Basketball Coaches NCAA Division III Coach of the Year in 1984 and 1989, as well as a five-time regional Coach of the Year and five-time conference Coach of the Year. Vander Meulen's teams appeared in the NCAA Division III playoffs 12 times and compiled a 241–127 record in conference games. Vander Meulen's Warhawks players were named all-conference a total of 63 times, all-region 25 times, and all-American 25 times.

== Coaching ==
=== High school ===
Vander Meulen got his first coaching job at PIttsville High School in PIttsville, WI. He coached there for three seasons.

Season	Record
1962–63	7–9
1963–64	8–12
1964–65	19–2; 1965 Marawood Conference championship.

Vander Meulen moved to Rhinelander High School for the 1965–66 season and coached there for four seasons.

Season	Record
1965–66	16–4; Wisconsin Valley Conference championship.
1966–67	15–5
1967–68	13–10
1968–69	18–3; Wisconsin Valley Conference championskip.

=== College assistant coaching ===
Vander Meulen served as an assistant to John Powless for the Wisconsin Badgers from 1969 to 1976. He then served as Marv Skaar's assistant for the North Dakota State Bison men's basketball team during the 1976–77 and 1977–78 seasons.

=== Head coach at UW-Whitewater ===
Vander Meulen replaced Jim Miller as the Wisconsin–Whitewater Warhawks head basketball coach beginning with the 1978–79 season. His 23 year tenure as head men's coach is the longest in school history, surpassing Chick Agnew and Pat Miller by one season. Vander Meulen's assistant coaches were Bill Baddeley for his first two seasons, LaMont Weaver from 1980 through 1993, and his former co-captain (of the 1989 NCAA championship team) Pat Miller from 1993 through 2001. Pat Miller was hired to replace Vander Meulen and coached the Warhawks for the next 22 seasons, leading the Warhawks to NCAA championships in 2012 and 2014.

Season	Overall	Conference	Postseason
1978–79	10–17	7–9	
1979–80	20–7	12–4	
1980–81	17–9	9–7	
1981–82	18–8	11–5	
1982–83	25–6	12–4	3–2; 4th place in NCAA tournament
1983–84	27–4	14–2 co-champions with UW-Stevens Point	5–0; NCAA champions
1984–85	20–8	10–6	1–1
1985–86	24–4	13–3	1–1
1986–87	16–10	6–10	
1987–88	26–6	13–3	1–1
1988–89	29–2	14–2 co-champions with UW-Eau Claire	5–0; NCAA champions
1989–90	17–9	8–8	
1990–91	16–10	10–6	
1991–92	19–9	10–6	1–1
1992–93	18–9	10–6	1–1
1993–94	21–4	14–2	0–1
1994–95	19–8	12–4	1–1
1995–96	19–9	10–6	2–1
1996–97	22–4	13–3	0–1
1997–98	16–9	9–7	
1998–99	17–8	9–7	
1999-00	11–14	5–11	
2000–01	17–8	14–2 co-champions with UW-Stevens Point	

== Honors ==
The basketball court in Kachel Gymnasium on the UW-Whitewater campus was named the “Dave ‘Augie’ Vander Meulen Court” in 2006. Vander Meulen was inducted into the UW-Whitewater Hall of Fame in 2006, the Wisconsin Basketball Coaches Association Hall of Fame in 2001, the Madison (Wis.) Sports Hall of Fame in 2002, The Rhinelander (Wis.) Hodag Sports Hall of Fame in 2007, the Madison (Wis.) East High School Hall of Fame, and the Wisconsin Intercollegiate Athletic Hall of Fame in 2018.

On April 6, 2013 Vander Meulen was presented the Division III Outstanding Service Award by the National Association of Basketball Coaches (NABC). The award is given to coaches whose actions “inside and outside the lines” of coaching have distinguished them as valuable members of their communities.

== Personal life ==
Dave "Augie" Vander Meulen is the son of Helen Vander Meulen (nee Jenswold) and former National Basketball League (Oshkosh All-Stars) player Augie Vander Meulen. His siblings are Judy (Vander Meulen) Crain and Thomas Vander Meulen. A dedication to education is a common thread in the Vander Meulen family.

Dave Vander Meulen graduated from Madison East High School. He walked on to the Wisconsin Badgers men's basketball team and played 3 years of varsity ball from 1958 to 1961, earning a full-scholarship for his junior and senior years. He earned his bachelor’s degree in 1962 and master’s degree in 1967, both in physical education, from UW-Madison. He married his wife Bonnie on September 30, 1973. The Vander Meulens have one daughter, Nicki, who is a member of the Madison Metropolitan School District Board of Education. The Vander Meulens reside in Madison, Wisconsin.
