= Wadley, Alabama =

- Town
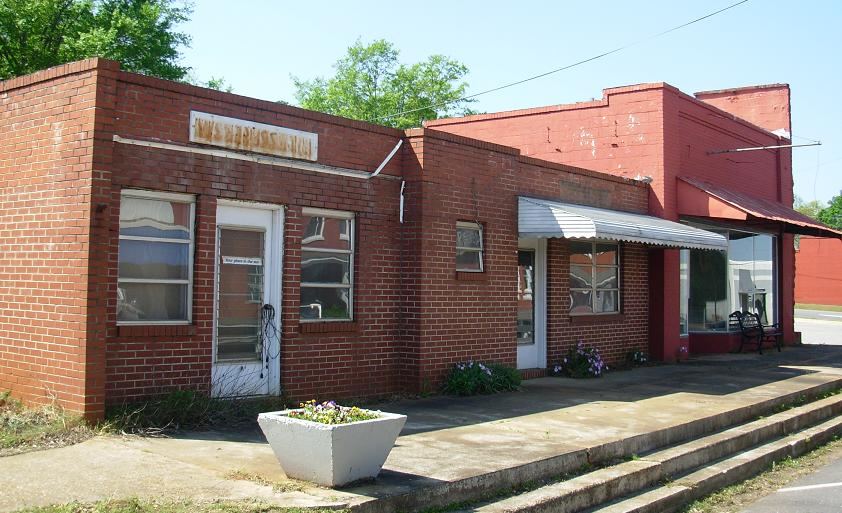

- Location of Wadley in Randolph County, Alabama.
- Coordinates: 33°7′24″N 85°33′59″W
- Country: United States
- State: Alabama
- County: Randolph

Government
  - Mayor: Donna McKay

Area
  - Total: 1.52 sq mi (3.94 km^{2})
  - Land: 1.46 sq mi (3.77 km^{2})
  - Water: 0.069 sq mi (0.18 km^{2})
- Elevation: 682 ft (208 m)

Population (2020)
  - Total: 659
  - Density: 452.9/sq mi (174.85/km^{2})
- Time zone: UTC-6 (CST)
  - Summer (DST): UTC-5 (CDT)
- ZIP code: 36276
- Area code: 256
- FIPS code: 01-79344
- GNIS feature ID: 0128488
- Website: townofwadley.com

Wadley is a town in Randolph County, Alabama, United States. It is home to the Wadley campus of Southern Union State Community College. As of the 2020 census, Wadley had a population of 659. According to the 1910 U.S. Census, the town was incorporated in 1908.

== Geography ==
According to the U.S. Census Bureau, the town has a total area of 1.4 square miles (3.6 km^{2}), of which 1.4 square miles (3.6 km^{2}) is land and 0.1 square miles (0.26 km^{2}) (4.17%) is water.

=== Climate ===
The climate in this area is characterized by hot, humid summers and generally mild to cool winters. According to the Köppen Climate Classification system, Wadley has a humid subtropical climate, abbreviated "Cfa" on climate maps.

== Demographics ==
Historical population
Census	Pop.	Note	%±
1910	426		—
1920	508		19.2%
1930	527		3.7%
1940	493		−6.5%
1950	535		8.5%
1960	605		13.1%
1970	626		3.5%
1980	532		−15.0%
1990	517		−2.8%
2000	640		23.8%
2010	751		17.3%
2020	659		−12.3%
U.S. Decennial Census; 2013 Estimate

As of the census of 2000, there were 640 people, 228 households, and 149 families residing in the town. The population density was 463.7 inhabitants per square mile (179.0/km^{2}). There were 276 housing units at an average density of 200.0 per square mile (77.2/km^{2}). The racial makeup of the town was 65.16% White, 33.28% Black or African American, 1.09% from other races, and 0.47% from two or more races. 2.19% of the population were Hispanic or Latino of any race.

There were 228 households, out of which 33.3% had children under the age of 18 living with them, 37.3% were married couples living together, 24.1% had a female householder with no husband present, and 34.6% were non-families. 32.5% of all households were made up of individuals, and 14.0% had someone living alone who was 65 years of age or older. The average household size was 2.28 and the average family size was 2.91.

In the town, the population was spread out, with 24.1% under the age of 18, 25.0% from 18 to 24, 23.4% from 25 to 44, 14.5% from 45 to 64, and 13.0% who were 65 years of age or older. The median age was 27 years. For every 100 females, there were 81.8 males. For every 100 females age 18 and over, there were 80.0 males.

The median income for a household in the town was $17,500, and the median income for a family was $24,219. Males had a median income of $26,563 versus $18,750 for females. The per capita income for the town was $9,076. About 29.4% of families and 30.9% of the population were below the poverty line, including 38.6% of those under age 18 and 28.2% of those age 65 or over.

== School ==
Wadley is home to Wadley High School. The local school district has an enrollment of about 400 children in all grades. The school's most notable alumnae are Terrance Wilkes and Terrell Zachery (Both cousins). Wilkes was one of the greatest running backs in Alabama history. He finished his career with 9,688 rushing yards and 160 touchdowns (Alabama state record) from 2003-06. Wilkes capped his career with 2,022 rushing yards and 35 touchdowns his senior season. Wilkes is also placed at #9 for all time points scored in high school football history. Tragically, just weeks after graduating, Terrance was sitting in a nearby car, when a group of 5 young men starting shooting. Terrance was struck in the neck by one of the gunman and succumbed to his wounds. Zachery, who played on the 2010 Auburn University College Football National Championship team. He has had NFL experience with the Jacksonville Jaguars.

== Notable people ==
- Kayla Braxton, WWE broadcaster
- Jamie Langley, Miss Alabama 2007
- Tom Radney, former American Democratic politician and lawyer

== Gallery ==
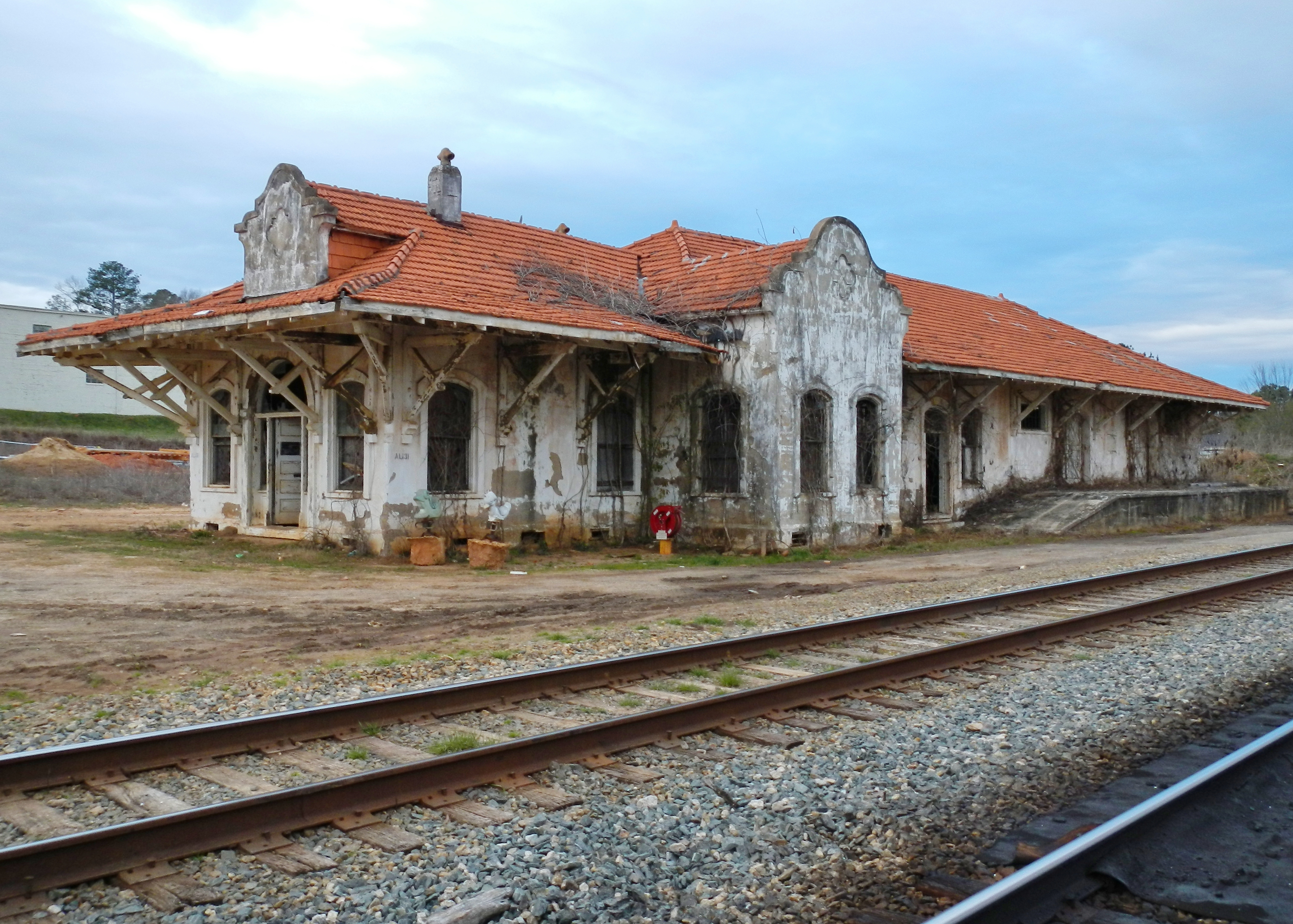
The Wadley Railroad Depot is a Mission-style depot, constructed in 1907.

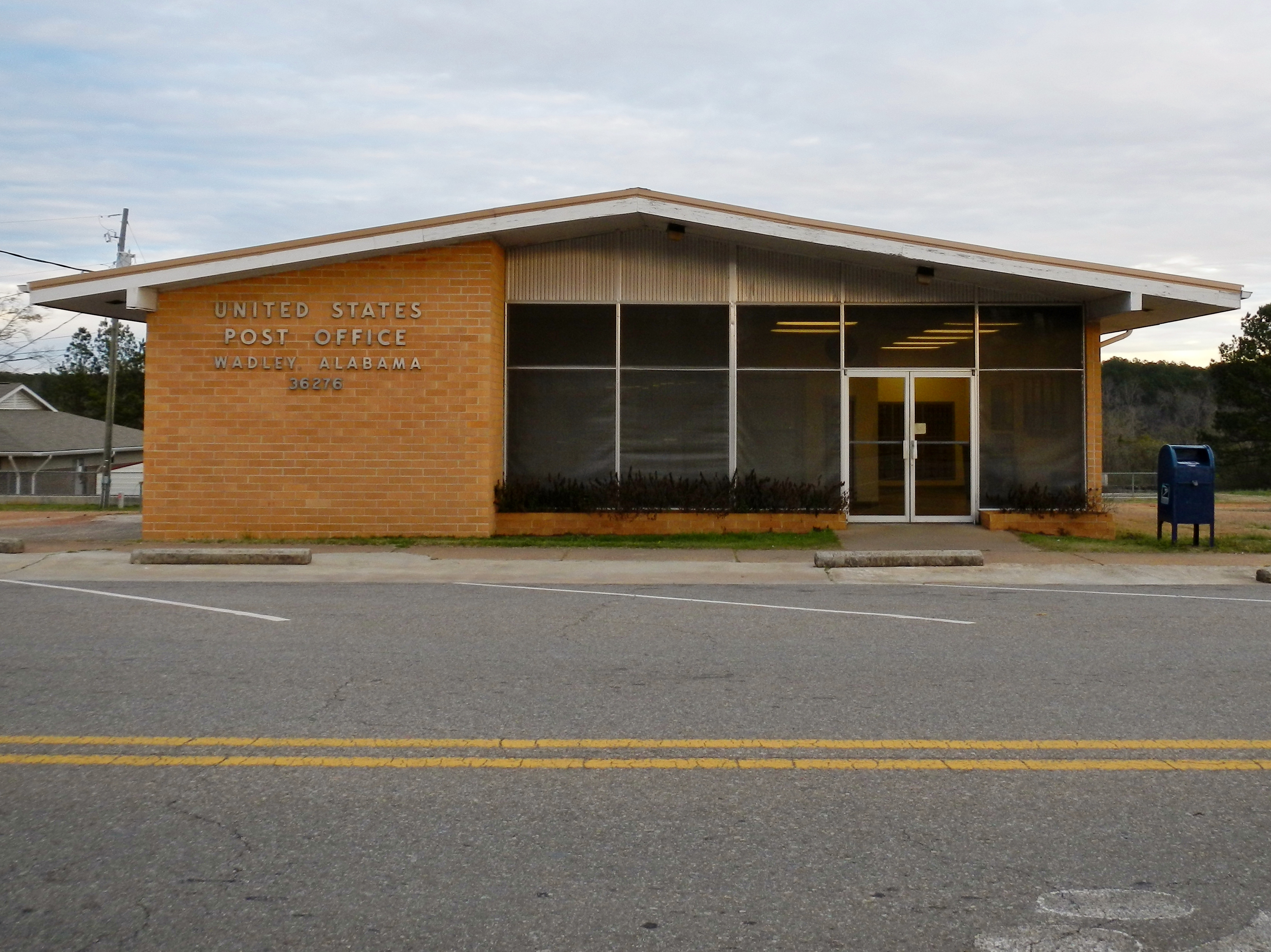
Wadley Post Office

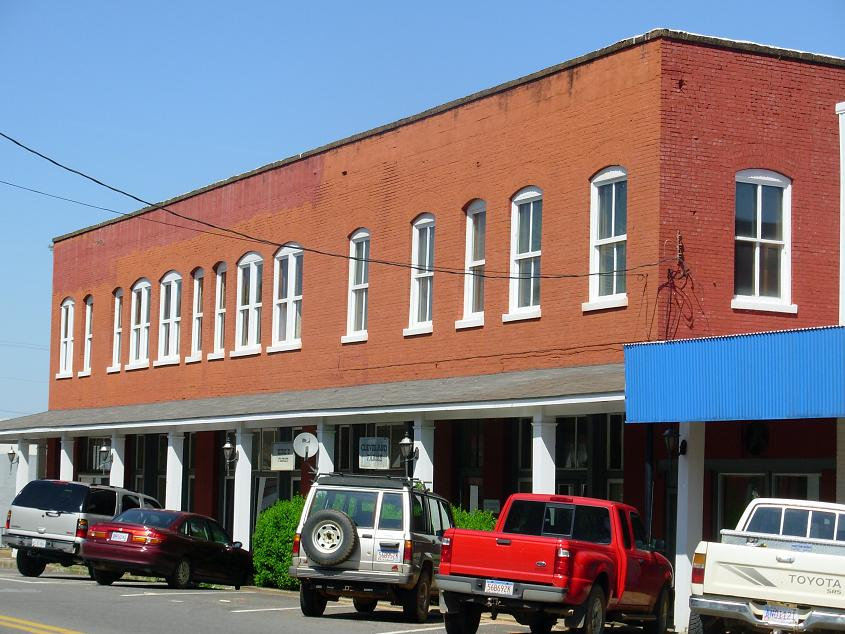
Downtown Wadley

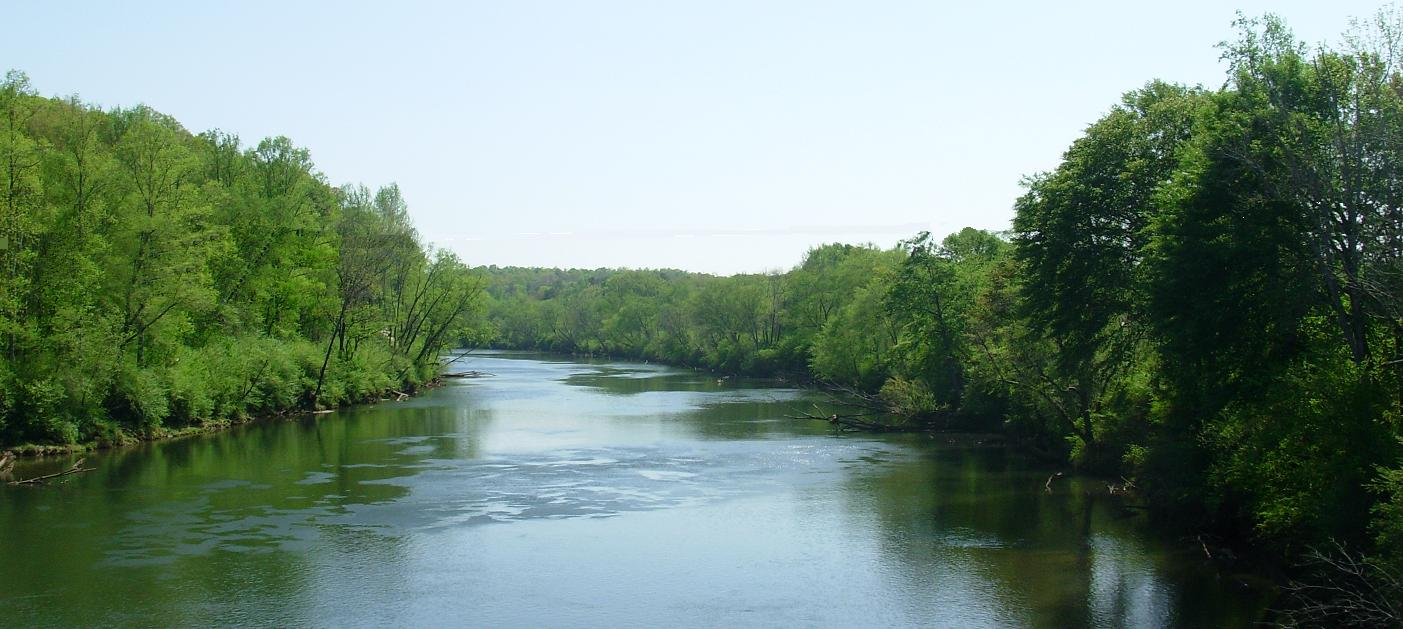
The Tallapoosa River runs to the east of Wadley.

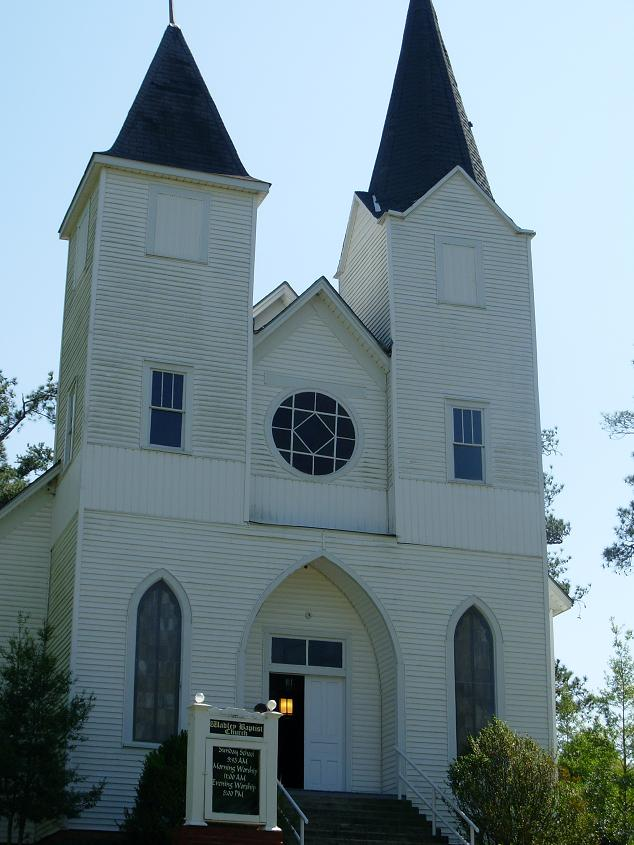
Wadley Baptist Church

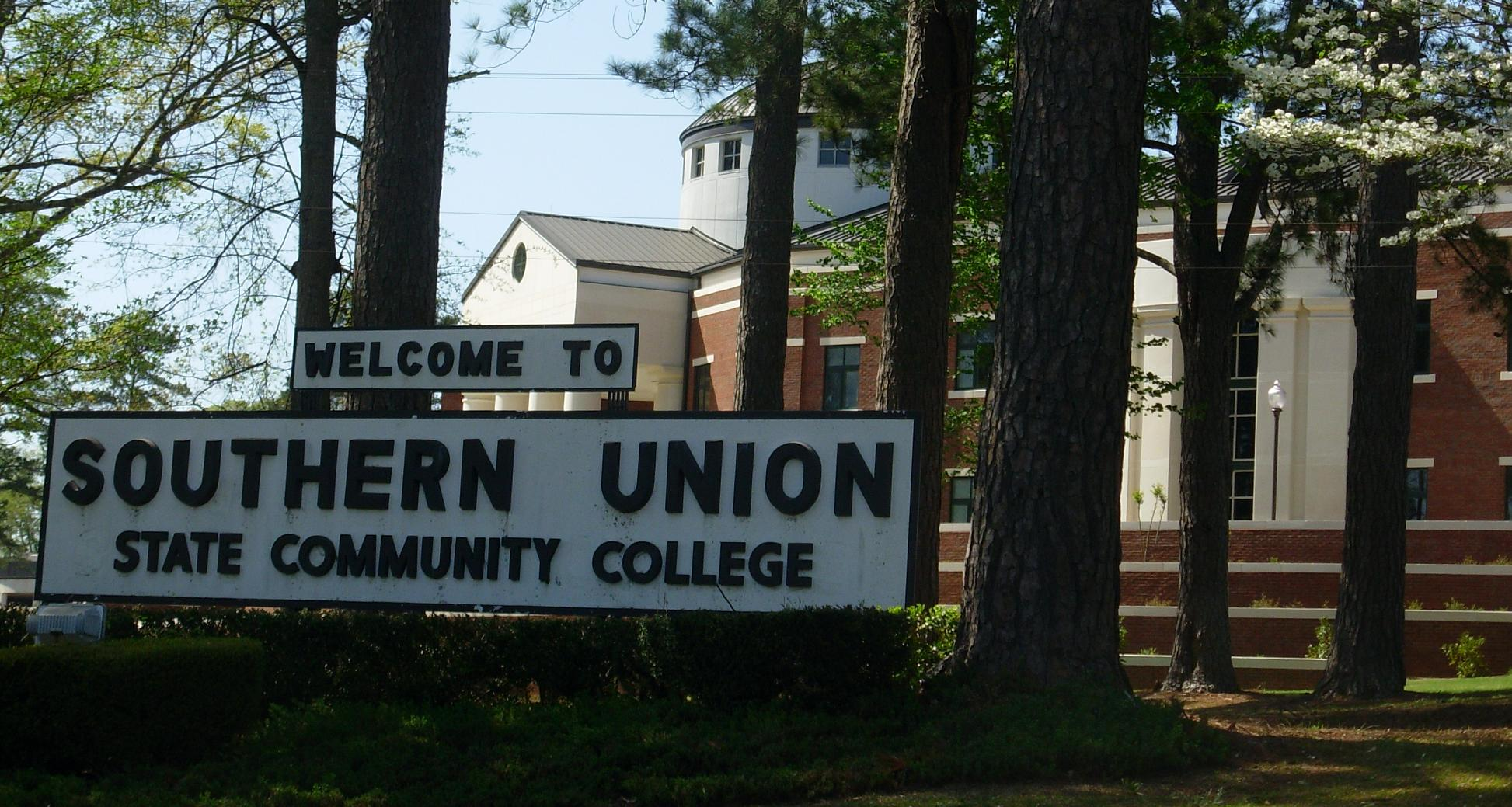
Southern Union State Community College's Wadley Campus

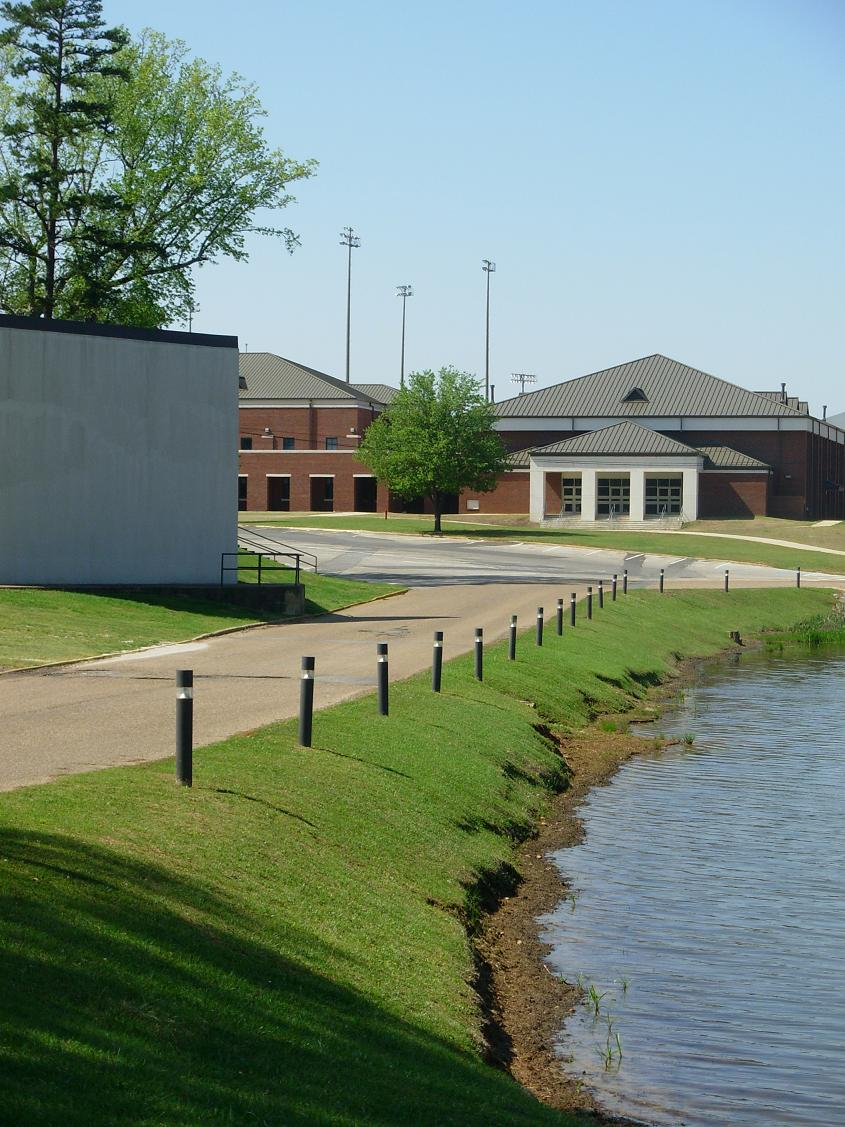
SUSCC Wadley

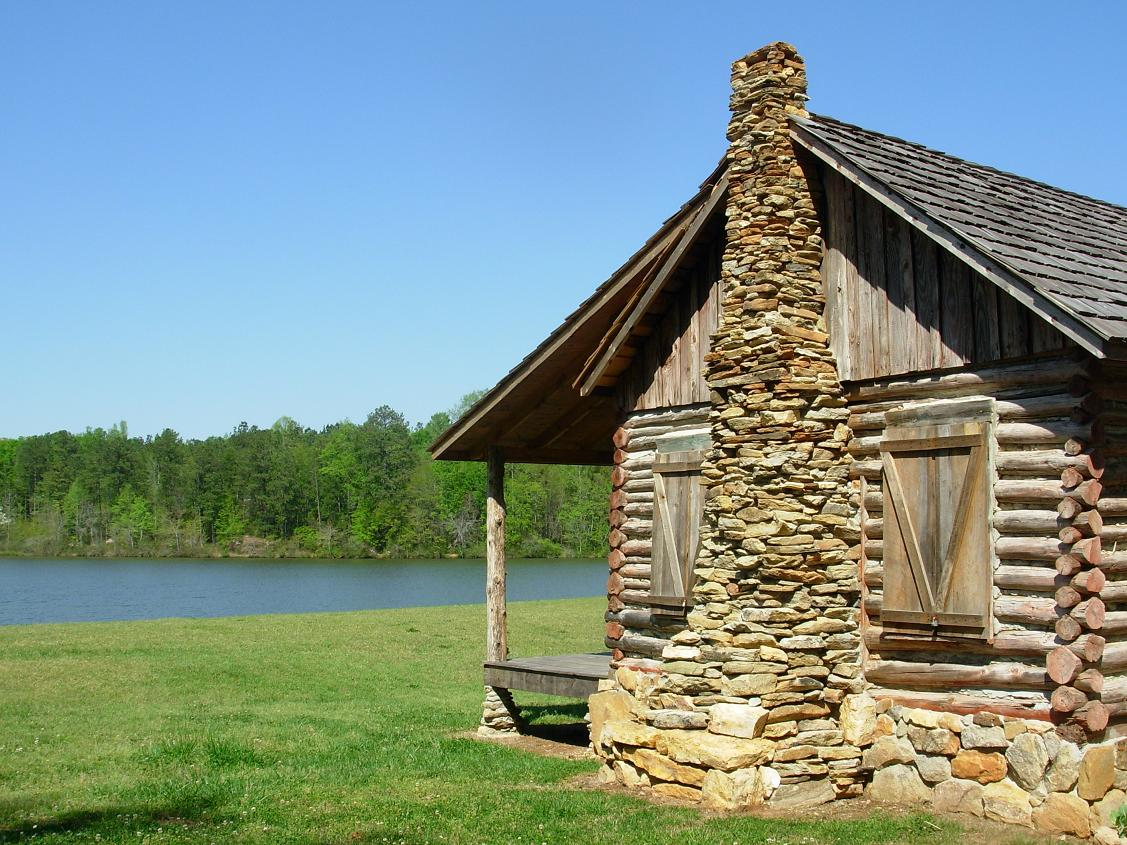
A relocated log cabin stands on the grounds of SUSCC.
