= Southern Union State Community College =

Public college in Wadley, Alabama, US

Southern Union State College
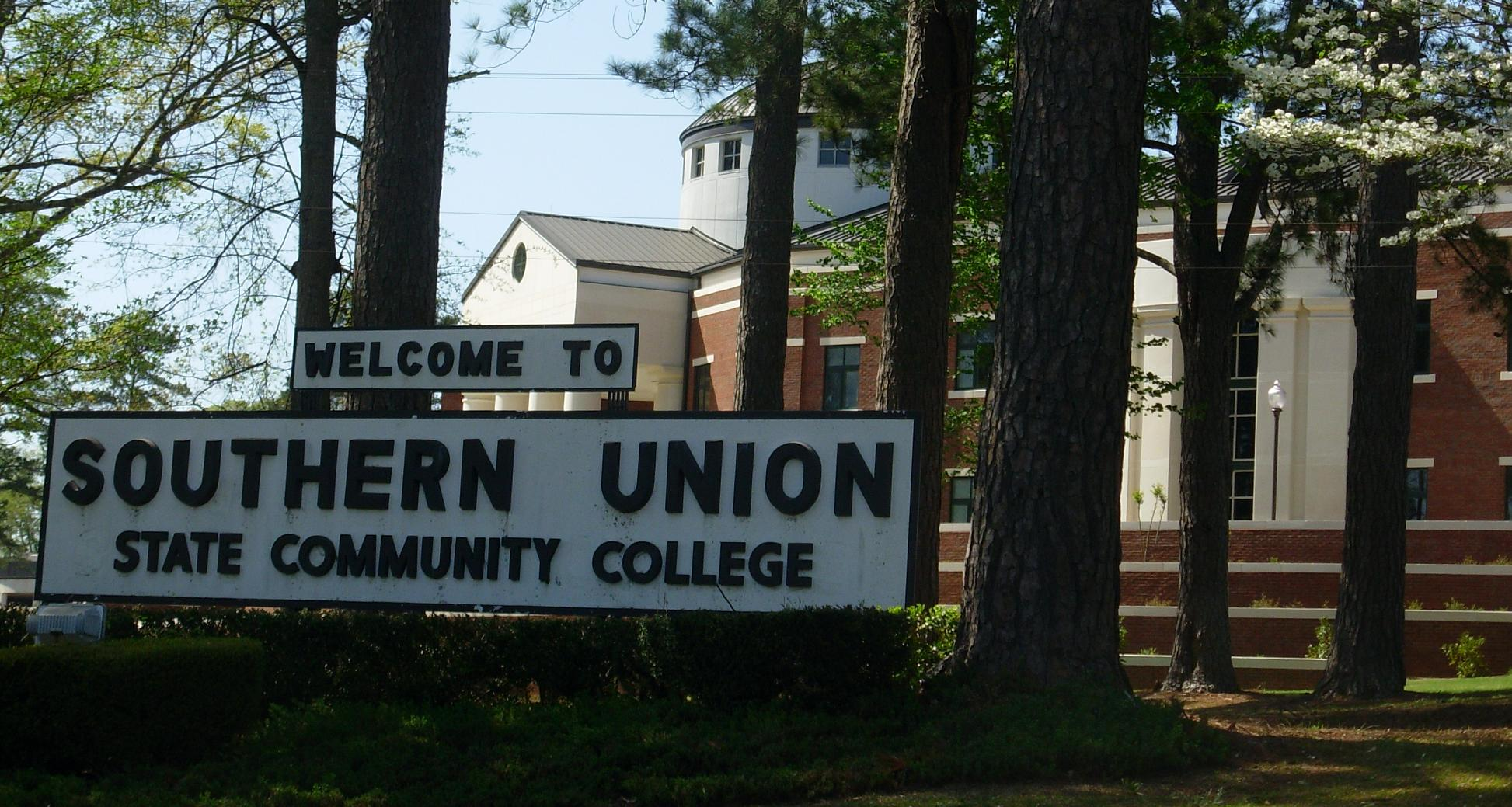
- SUSCC Wadley Campus
- Former names: Piedmont Junior College, Southern Union College
- Type: Community college system
- Established: 1923
- President: Todd Shackett
- Total staff: 250
- Students: 4,386
- Location: Opelika, Wadley and Valley, Alabama, United States; 33.1281°N 85.5727°W
- Website: www.suscc.edu

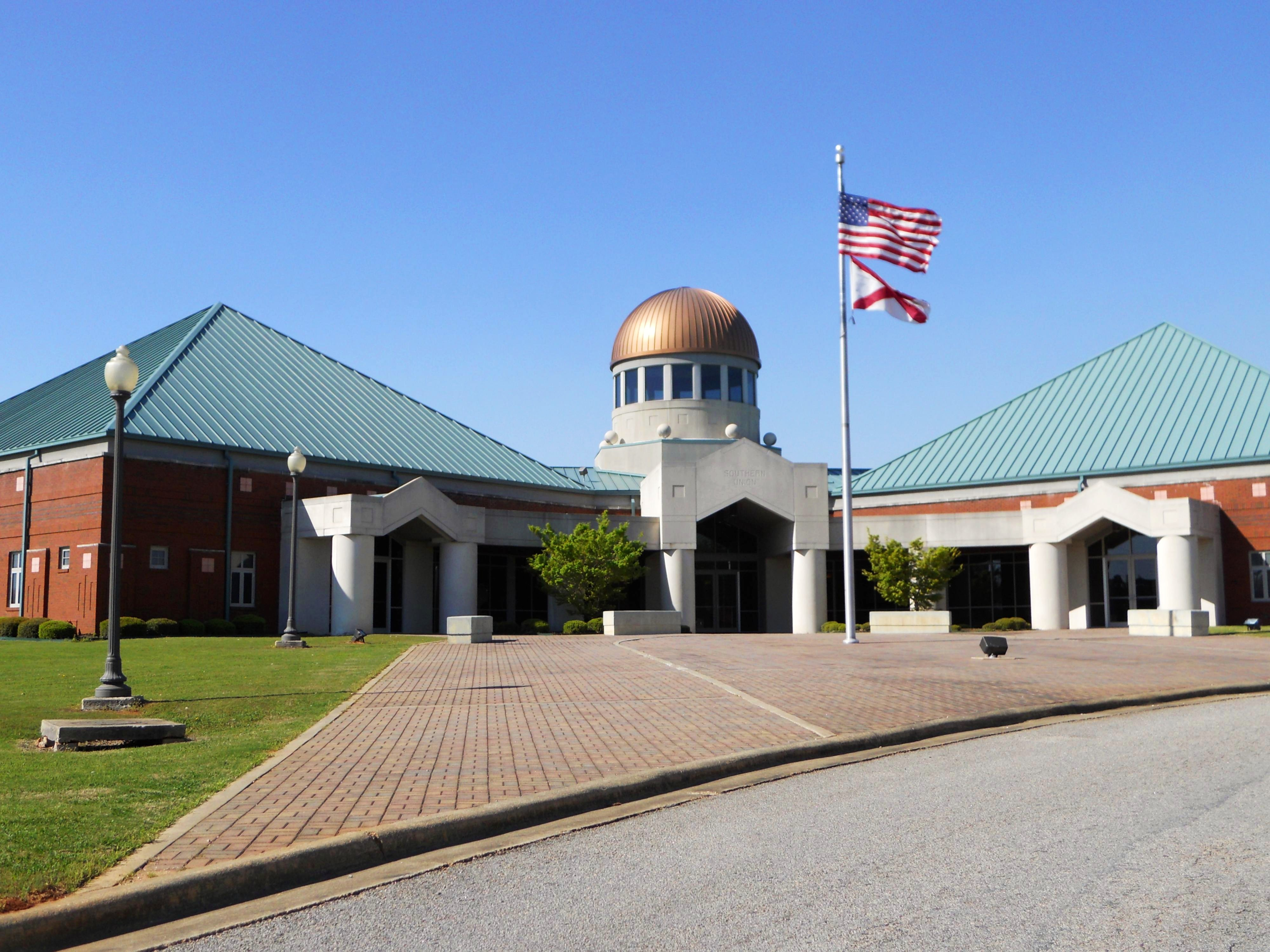
SUSCC Opelika Campus

Southern Union State Community College (SUSCC) is a public community college in Wadley, Alabama. Southern Union offers academic, technical, health science, and social science programs to the east-central Alabama and west-central Georgia regions.

Southern Union has branch campuses in Opelika, Alabama and Valley, Alabama.
