= Derrick Allen =

American basketball player and coach

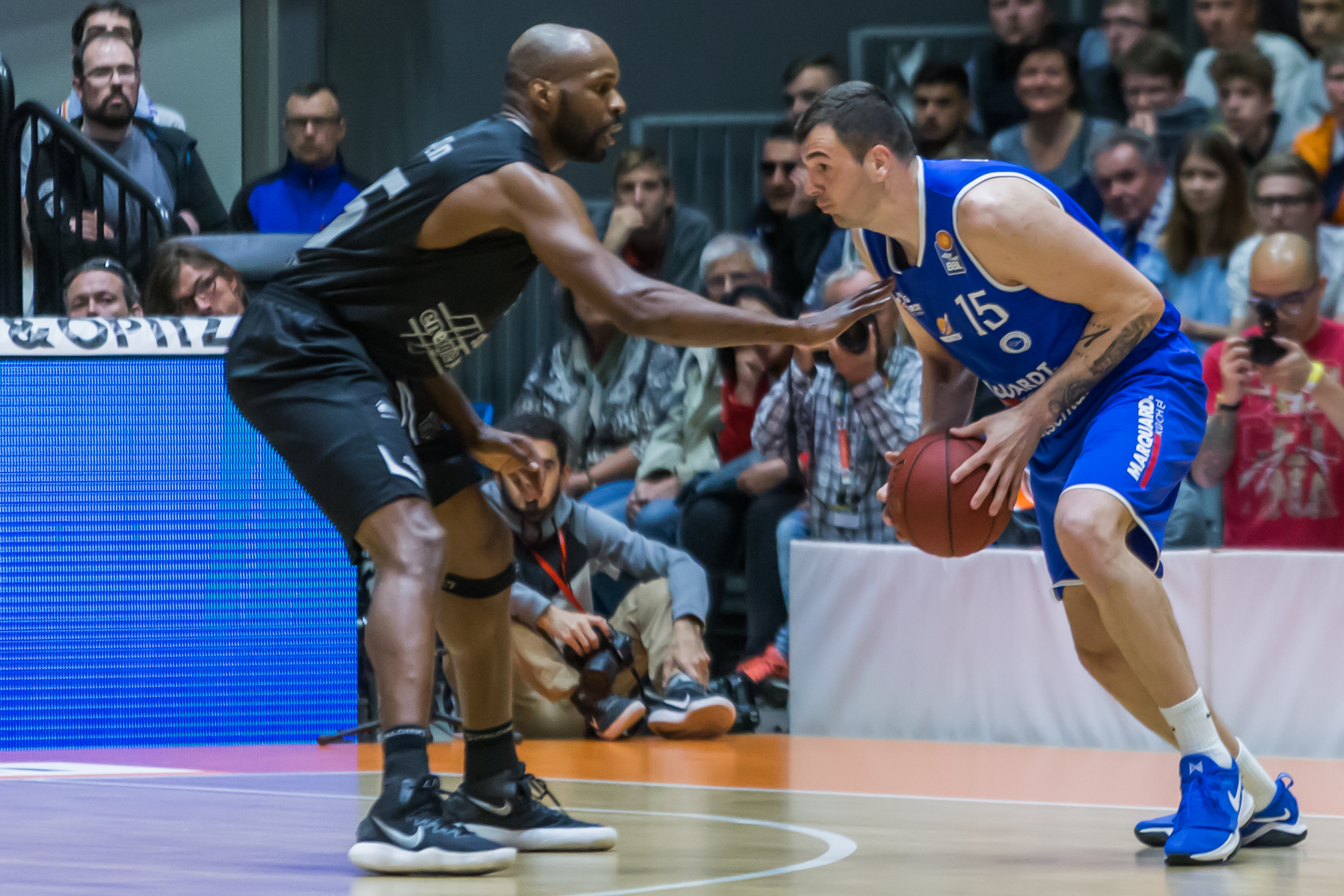
- Allen in 2018 (black jersey)

Duquesne Dukes
- Title: Assistant coach
- League: Atlantic 10 Conference

Personal information
- Born: July 17, 1980 (age 46)
- Listed height: 6 ft 8 in (2.03 m)
- Listed weight: 220 lb (100 kg)

Career information
- High school: Gadsden (Gadsden, Alabama)
- College: Southern Union State CC (1998–2000); Ole Miss (2001–2003)
- NBA draft: 2003: undrafted
- Playing career: 2003–2019
- Position: Power forward

Career history

Playing
- 2003–2004: Keflavík
- 2004–2006: Karlsruhe
- 2006–2007: Bayer Giants Leverkusen
- 2007–2010: Skyliners Frankfurt
- 2010–2012: Alba Berlin
- 2012–2013: Spirou Charleroi
- 2013–2014: Eisbären Bremerhaven
- 2014–2015: Löwen Braunschweig
- 2015–2017: Rasta Vechta
- 2017–2019: Science City Jena

Coaching
- 2019–2021: Rasta Vechta (assistant)
- 2021: Rasta Vechta
- 2022–2023: Capital City Go-Go (assistant)
- 2023–2024: Capitanes de la Ciudad de México (assistant)
- 2024: Venados de Mazatlán
- 2024–2025: Capitanes de la Ciudad de México (assistant)
- 2025–2026: Coviran Granada (assistant)
- 2026–present: Duquesne (assistant)

Career highlights
- Bundesliga leading scorer (2007); Icelandic League champion (2004); Icelandic Cup winner (2004); AJCCC Player of the Year (2000)

Derrick Dewayne Allen (born July 17, 1980) is an American professional basketball coach and former player. He is currently an assistant coach for the Duquesne University men's basketball team.

== Playing career ==
=== College basketball ===
Growing up in Gadsden, Alabama, Allen attended Gadsden High School before his time at Southern Union State Community College in Wadley, Alabama. In 2000, he was named Alabama Junior Community College Conference (AJCCC) Player of the Year and transferred to Ole Miss following his sophomore year.

He had to redshirt the 2000–01 season due to tendonitis in his left knee. Allen saw action in 60 games with the Ole Miss Rebels between 2001 and 2003, averaging 8.6 points and 5.4 rebounds per contest.

=== Professional basketball ===
Allen launched his professional basketball career in Iceland, playing for Keflavík in the 2003–04 campaign. He was a key player in Keflavík's double-winning campaign (national championship and cup competition), turning in averages of 23.4 points and 10.5 rebounds in league play. In eight games of the FIBA Europe Cup (FIBA EuroCup Challenge), he averaged 26.6 points and 9.4 boards a contest.

In the following years, Allen made his mark in the German Basketball Bundesliga, playing for BG Karlsruhe, Bayer Giants Leverkusen, the Skyliners Frankfurt and Alba Berlin. He garnered Eurobasket.com All-German Bundesliga Forward of the Year honors in 2008 and was a Eurobasket.com All-German Bundesliga First Team selection in 2008, 2010 and 2011. He reached the Bundesliga finals with Frankfurt in 2010 and with Berlin in 2011. Over the years, Allen made multiple appearances in international competitions such as the EuroCup, the FIBA EuroChallenge and the FIBA Europe Cup (FIBA EuroCup Challenge).

After spending the 2012–13 season with Belgian powerhouse Spirou BC Charleroi, Allen returned to Germany, enjoying stints with Eisbären Bremerhaven, Basketball Löwen Braunschweig and SC Rasta Vechta. He was part of Vechta's Bundesliga promotion-winning side in 2016. At the end of the 2016–17 Bundesliga season, his Vechta team had to accept relegation from the German top-tier. Allen signed with another Bundesliga team, Science City Jena on May 23, 2017.

Allen announced his retirement from professional basketball in August 2019.

== Coaching career ==
In September 2019, he was named assistant coach at German Bundesliga side SC Rasta Vechta. He stayed on that job until the end of the 2019–20 season. On August 11, 2020, he re-signed with Vechta. Allen was promoted to the head coaching role on March 29, 2021, following the firing of Thomas Päch. Allen's Vechta team was relegated to the German second-tier ProA at the conclusion of the 2020–21 season. He was released in October 2021 after five straight losses. He joined the Capital City Go-Go of the NBA G League as an assistant coach for the 2022–23 season.

Allen became an assistant coach for the Capitanes de la Ciudad de México in 2023.

On April 3, 2024, Allen was named head coach of the Venados de Mazatlán of the Circuito de Baloncesto de la Costa del Pacífico in Mexico. He then rejoined the Capitanes' staff.

He joined the coaching staff of Coviran Granada of the Liga ACB in August 2025. In July 2026, Allen was appointed assistant coach of the Duquesne University men's basketball team, joining the staff of his former teammate Dru Joyce III.
