= 2011 Eurocup Basketball Final Four =

2011 Eurocup finals
Tournament details
- Arena: Palaverde; Treviso, Italy
- Dates: 16–17 April 2011

Final positions
- Champions: (Russia) UNICS (1st title)
- Runners-up: (Spain) Cajasol
- Third place: (Croatia) Cedevita
- Fourth place: (Italy) Benetton Bwin

Awards and statistics
- MVP: (Croatia) Marko Popović

The 2011 Eurocup Basketball finals was the concluding Final Four tournament of the 2010–11 Eurocup Basketball season. The event was held at Treviso in Italy from April 16 and 17, 2011.

== Bracket ==
Semifinals
16 April
(Russia) UNICS	87
(Croatia) Cedevita Zagreb	66
16 April
(Spain) Cajasol	75
(Italy) Benetton Bwin	63

Final
17 April
(Russia) UNICS	68
(Spain) Cajasol	77
Third place game
17 April
(Croatia) Cedevita Zagreb	59
(Italy) Benetton Bwin	57

== Semifinals ==
16 April 2011	UNICS Kazan (Russia)	87–66	(Croatia) Cedevita Zagreb	Palaverde, Treviso
18:00	Scoring by quarter: 22–13, 25–17, 20–25, 20–11
	Pts: Lyday 27; Rebs: Lampe 8 Asts: Popović 4	Report	Pts: Rudež 16; Rebs: Draper, Baždarić 7 Asts: Draper 5	Attendance: 5,000; Referees: Jose Martin (ESP), Guerrino Cerebuch (ITA), Panagiotis Anastopoulos (GRE)

16 April 2011	Cajasol (Spain)	75–63	(Italy) Benetton Basket Bwin	Palaverde, Treviso
20:45	Scoring by quarter: 22–16, 18–17, 16–17, 19–13
	Pts: Kirksay 16; Rebs: Three players 5 Asts: Bullock 4	Report	Pts: Bulleri 15; Rebs: Smith, Markovic 5 Asts: Gentile, Markovic 2	Attendance: 4,532; Referees: Volodymr Drabikovsky (UKR), Sinisa Herceg (CRO), Borys Ryzhyk (UKR)

== Third place game ==
17 April 2011	Cedevita Zagreb (Croatia)	59–57	(Italy) Benetton Basket Bwin	Palaverde, Treviso
18:00	Scoring by quarter: 6–12, 15–11, 16–13, 22–21
	Pts: Edwards 16; Rebs: Draper, Edwards 9 Asts: Draper 4	Report	Pts: Motiejunas, Brunner 10; Rebs: Smith, Brunner 11; Asts: Peric, Smith 4	Attendance: 4,543; Referees: Jose Martin (ESP), Milija Vojinovic (SRB), Olegs Latisevs (LAT)

== Final ==
17 April 2011	UNICS Kazan (Russia)	92–77	(Spain) Cajasol	Palaverde, Treviso
20:45	Scoring by quarter: 32–16, 19–20, 20–26, 21–15
	Pts: Lampe 26; Rebs: Lampe 11; Asts: Popović 11	Report	Pts: Urtasun, Bullock 15; Rebs: Triguero 9 Asts: Satoransky 4	Attendance: 4,554; Referees: Guerrino Cerebuch (ITA), Borys Ryzhyk (UKR), Panagiotis Anastopoulos (GRE)
