= Maurice Bailey =

Maurice Bailey may refer to:

- Maurice Bailey (basketball) (born 1981), American-Jamaican basketball player
- Maurice Bailey (1933–2017), survived for 118 days on a rubber raft with his wife, see Maurice and Maralyn Bailey
