= Kyle Weaver =

American basketball player (born 1986)

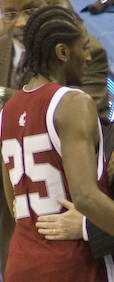
- Weaver with Washington State in 2008

Personal information
- Born: February 18, 1986 (age 40) Beloit, Wisconsin, U.S.
- Listed height: 6 ft 6 in (1.98 m)
- Listed weight: 207 lb (94 kg)

Career information
- High school: Beloit Memorial (Beloit, Wisconsin)
- College: Washington State (2004–2008)
- NBA draft: 2008: 2nd round, 38th overall pick
- Drafted by: Charlotte Bobcats
- Playing career: 2008–2020
- Position: Shooting guard / small forward
- Number: 5, 3

Career history
- 2008–2010: Oklahoma City Thunder
- 2009–2010: →Tulsa 66ers
- 2010–2011: Iowa Energy
- 2011: Austin Toros
- 2011: Utah Jazz
- 2011: Spirou Charleroi
- 2011–2012: Alba Berlin
- 2012–2013: Austin Toros
- 2013: Canton Charge
- 2013–2014: Azzurro Napoli
- 2014–2015: Bnei Herzliya
- 2015: Caciques de Humacao
- 2015–2016: Roseto Sharks
- 2016–2017: Pierniki Toruń
- 2017–2018: Aris Thessaloniki
- 2018: Science City Jena
- 2018–2019: Neptūnas Klaipėda
- 2019–2020: Polski Cukier Toruń

Career highlights
- First-team All-Pac-10 (2007); Second-team All-Pac-10 (2008)
- Stats at NBA.com
- Stats at Basketball Reference

Kyle Donovan Weaver (born February 18, 1986) is an American former professional basketball player. He played college basketball for Washington State University, and was drafted 38th overall by the Charlotte Bobcats in the 2008 NBA draft. Weaver, a 6-foot-6-inch (1.98 m) shooting guard-small forward, was born in Beloit, Wisconsin. His father, LaMont Weaver, played collegiate basketball at the University of Wisconsin.

== High school ==
Weaver attended Beloit Memorial High School, in Beloit, Wisconsin, where he played high school basketball.

== College career ==
Weaver had a career-high 25 points and 12 rebounds in a 75–68 Washington State loss to Stanford on March 14, 2008, at the Staples Center, in Los Angeles, California.

== Professional career ==
On August 11, 2008, Weaver was traded by the Charlotte Bobcats to the Oklahoma City Thunder, for a second-round draft pick from the 2009 NBA draft, which originally belonged to the New Jersey Nets. The Thunder assigned Weaver to the NBA Development League affiliate Tulsa 66ers, in April 2009, November 2009, March 2010, and April 2010.

Weaver spent the 2010 training camp with the Chicago Bulls, but he was waived on October 21. After spending several months in the NBA D-League, he was signed by the Utah Jazz, on March 30, 2011.

In April 2011, he signed with Spirou Charleroi in Belgium.

In July 2011, he joined the German team Alba Berlin.

In October 2012, he signed with the Memphis Grizzlies. On October 23, 2012, Weaver was waived by the Grizzlies. Weaver then signed with the Austin Toros. On February 25, 2013, Weaver was traded to the Canton Charge.

On August 19, 2013, he signed a one-year deal with Azzurro Napoli.

On October 28, 2014, he signed with Bnei Herzliya of Israel, for the 2014–15 season. On January 9, 2015, he was released by the Israeli team. On March 7, he signed with Caciques de Humacao, of the Puerto Rican Baloncesto Superior Nacional. He left the club after appearing in only two games.

On August 28, 2015, Weaver signed with the Roseto Sharks, for the 2015–16 Serie A2 Basket season.

On October 4, 2016, Weaver signed with the Polish club Pierniki Toruń, for the 2016–17 PLK season.

On August 3, 2017, Weaver signed with the Greek club Aris Thessaloniki for the 2017–18 season.

On August 8, 2018, Weaver inked with Neptūnas Klaipėda of the Lithuanian Basketball League (LKL).

On August 27, 2019, he has signed with Polski Cukier Toruń of the PLK.

== Career statistics ==
Legend
GP	Games played	GS	Games started	MPG	Minutes per game
FG%	Field goal percentage	3P%	3-point field goal percentage	FT%	Free throw percentage
RPG	Rebounds per game	APG	Assists per game	SPG	Steals per game
BPG	Blocks per game	PPG	Points per game	**Bold**	Career high

=== NBA ===
==== Regular season ====
Year	Team	GP	GS	MPG	FG%	3P%	FT%	RPG	APG	SPG	BPG	PPG
2008–09	Oklahoma City	**56**	**19**	**20.8**	**.459**	.344	.707	**2.4**	**1.8**	**.8**	.4	5.3
2009–10	Oklahoma City	12	0	12.0	.364	.368	.833	1.5	.9	.5	**.5**	3.0
2010–11	Utah	5	0	13.8	.360	**.429**	**.875**	2.0	1.4	.4	.4	**5.6**
Career		73	19	18.9	.441	.353	.736	2.2	1.6	.8	.5	5.0

==== Playoffs ====
Year	Team	GP	GS	MPG	FG%	3P%	FT%	RPG	APG	SPG	BPG	PPG
2010	Oklahoma City	1	0	12.0	.250	.000	.000	2.0	2.0	.0	.0	2.0
Career		1	0	12.0	.250	.000	.000	2.0	2.0	.0	.0	2.0

=== College ===
Year	Team	GP	GS	MPG	FG%	3P%	FT%	RPG	APG	SPG	BPG	PPG
2004–05	Washington State	25	10	19.6	.387	.091	.551	3.2	2.0	.6	.4	4.8
2005–06	Washington State	27	25	29.7	.483	.276	.688	4.3	4.0	1.4	.7	8.6
2006–07	Washington State	34	33	**33.9**	**.487**	.237	**.770**	**5.6**	**4.6**	**2.2**	**1.2**	11.2
2007–08	Washington State	**35**	**35**	33.1	.463	**.364**	.733	5.3	4.3	1.7	.7	**12.2**
Career		121	103	29.8	.464	.277	.716	4.7	3.8	1.6	.8	9.6
