= Bryce Taylor (basketball) =

American-German basketball player (born 1986)

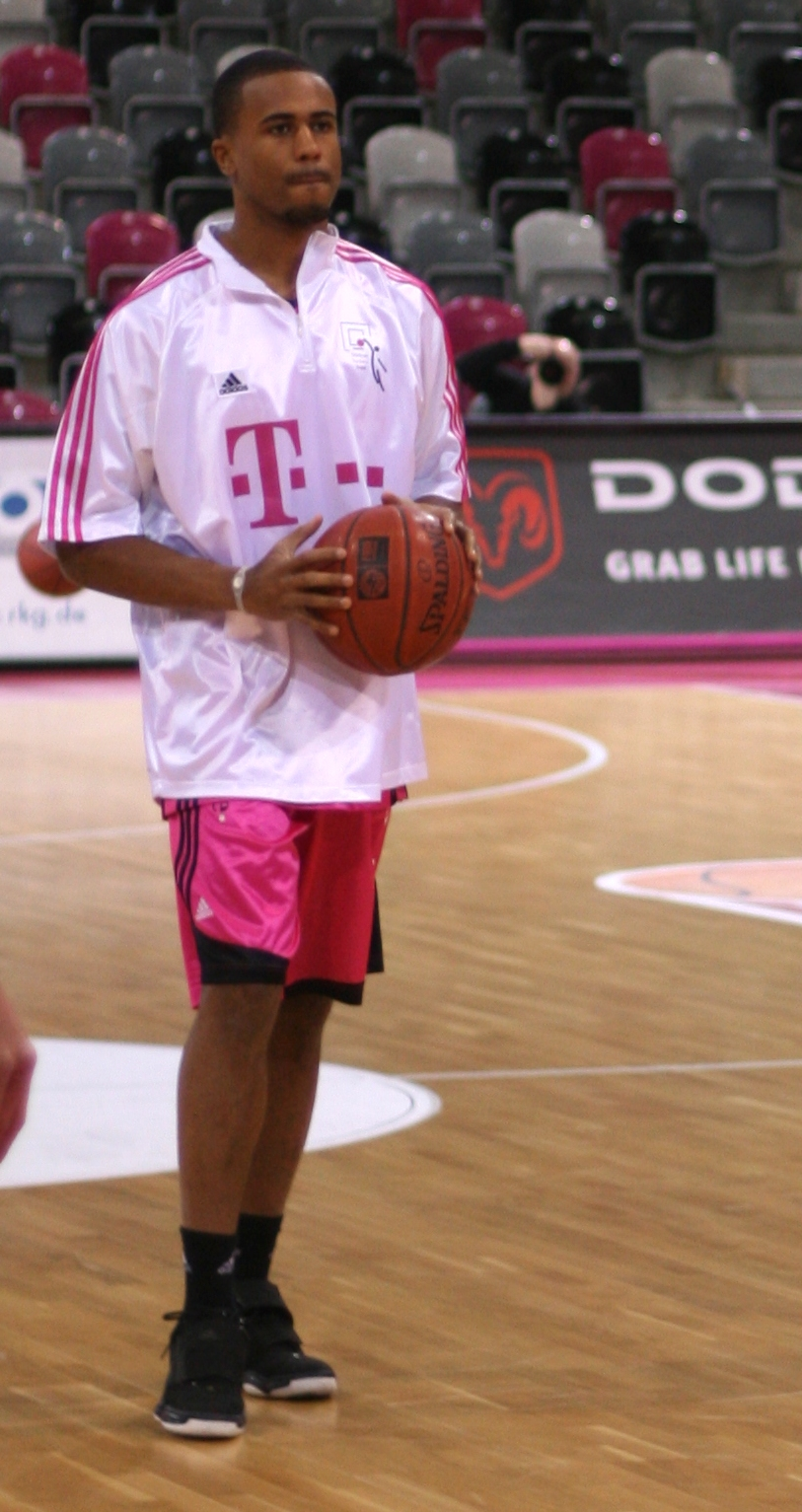
- Taylor with Telekom Baskets Bonn

Noblesville Boom
- Title: Head coach
- League: NBA G League

Personal information
- Born: September 27, 1986 (age 40) Encino, California, U.S.
- Listed height: 1.94 m (6 ft 4 1/2 in)
- Listed weight: 89 kg (196 lb)

Career information
- High school: Harvard-Westlake (Los Angeles, California)
- College: Oregon (2005–2008)
- NBA draft: 2008: undrafted
- Playing career: 2008–2021
- Position: Shooting guard

Career history

Playing
- 2008–2009: Sutor Montegranaro
- 2009–2010: Bonn
- 2010–2012: Alba Berlin
- 2012–2013: Artland Dragons
- 2013–2017: Bayern Munich
- 2017–2020: Brose Bamberg
- 2020–2021: Hamburg Towers

Coaching
- 2021–2022: Indiana Pacers (Player Development)
- 2022–2023: EWE Baskets Oldenburg (assistant)
- 2023–2026: Indiana Mad Ants / Noblesville Boom (assistant)
- 2026–present: Noblesville Boom

Career highlights
- BBL Cup Champion (2019); All-BBL First Team (2016); BBL Champion (2014); EuroLeague 50–40–90 club (2014); 4× BBL All-Star (2013–2016); 2× All-BBL Second Team (2012, 2014); Pac-10 All-Freshman Team (2005)

Bryce Taylor (born September 27, 1986) is an American-German professional former basketball player currently working as a head coach for the Noblesville Boom of the NBA G League. He played college basketball for the Oregon Ducks. In April 2018, he was granted German citizenship.

Taylor's father Brian Taylor spent 10 years in the ABA and NBA, averaging 18.6 points per game. He was a nine-time ABA All-Star and the 1973 ABA American Basketball association Rookie of the Year.

== High school career ==
Prior to arriving at the University of Oregon, Taylor starred at Harvard-Westlake School, where he set a school record by scoring 54 points in a game, as his team won three straight CIF championships.

== College career ==
Taylor arrived at Oregon with high expectations, and as a freshman he did not disappoint. Taylor averaged 11.6 points per game and shot 37% from three-point range. Highlights included a then career-high 26 point effort in December against Fresno State, a contest in which he scored the game winner. However, Taylor's sophomore season was a disappointing one as his scoring average dipped to 9.3 points per game.

Known primarily as a three-point shooter in high school and his first two years at Oregon, Taylor reinvented his game over the 2006 off-season, establishing himself not only as a slasher but also as a defensive specialist. As a result, Oregon head coach Ernie Kent regularly assigned Taylor to guard the opposing team's best player. Taylor also rediscovered his three-point prowess during the 2006–07 campaign, and is currently connecting on 42.4% from beyond the arc. For his efforts, Taylor was named the team's Most Improved Player.

During the 2007 Pac-10 Tournament Championship game against the USC Trojans, Taylor poured in 32 points, making all 11 of his shots from the field in an 81–57 drubbing. He was a perfect 7 for 7 from the three-point line and 3 for 3 from the foul line in helping Oregon win their second Pac-10 Tournament Championship in the last five years.

== Professional career ==
Taylor played his rookie season in Italian Lega Basket Serie A for Sutor Montegranaro in 2008–2009. He then moved to German Basketball Bundesliga the following season and played for Telekom Baskets Bonn. In 2010 Bryce Taylor signed a short-term deal with German team Alba Berlin which was extended for the rest of the season. He emerged more and more into a crowd favorite due to his spectacular game. He re-signed for another one-year deal for the 2011–12 season, where he was even voted into the All-BBL Second Team. In the 2012–13 season he played for the Artland Dragons.

In June 2013 he signed a two-year deal with Bayern Munich, and helped the club win the 2014 championship. In July 2014, Taylor agreed on a contract extension with Bayern until 2016, including a team option for the 2016–17 season.

On June 25, 2017, Taylor signed a three-year contract with Brose Bamberg. Taylor averaged 4.4 points and 0.9 rebounds per game during the 2019–20 season. He parted ways with the team on August 11, 2020. The following day, Taylor signed with the Hamburg Towers.

== Coaching career ==
In the 2021–22 season, Taylor served as Player Development Assistant for the Indiana Pacers in the NBA under head coach Rick Carlisle. In June 2022, he was appointed assistant coach of German Bundesliga side EWE Baskets Oldenburg.

On October 4, 2023, Taylor became an assistant for the Indiana Mad Ants of the NBA G League. June 1, 2026, Taylor was promoted to the role of head coach, with the team newly rebranded as the Noblesville Boom.

== Career statistics ==
Legend
GP	Games played	MPG	Minutes per game	FG%	Field goal percentage
3P%	3-point field goal percentage	FT%	Free throw percentage	RPG	Rebounds per game
APG	Assists per game	SPG	Steals per game	BPG	Blocks per game
PPG	Points per game	**Bold**	Career high		Led the league

Year	Team	League	GP	MPG	FG%	3P%	FT%	RPG	APG	SPG	BPG	PPG
2013–14	Bayern Munich	EuroLeague	22	23.4	.463	**.510**	.900	3.5	1.2	1.1	.0	8.5
2014–15	Bayern Munich	EuroLeague	2	19.3	.286	.500	.833	3.0	1.5	1.0	**.5**	5.5
2015–16	Bayern Munich	Basketball Bundesliga	**35**	**26.2**	**.541**	.482	**.939**	3.3	**1.7**	1.1	.1	**13.6**
2015–16	Bayern Munich	EuroLeague	9	23.4	.400	.304	.882	3.6	1.3	.6	.1	6.7
2017–18	Brose Bamberg	EuroLeague	10	23.9	.455	.433	.833	2.1	.7	.7	.2	6.8
2018–19	Brose Bamberg	Basketball Bundesliga	30	20.0	.457	.438	.913	2.0	1.3	.7	.1	7.3
2020–21	Hamburg Towers	Basketball Bundesliga	26	15.7	.473	.452	.867	1.1	.4	.5	.1	6.0
Career		All Leagues	134	21.9	.482	.456	.913	2.5	1.2	.8	.1	8.8
