= Palaverde =

Indoor arena in Villorba, Italy

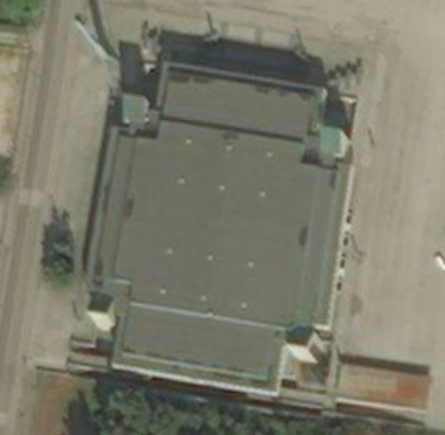
- Interactive map of Palaverde
- Location: Via Guglielmo Marconi, 14, Villorba, TV 31020, Italy
- Coordinates: 45°43′27″N 12°15′45″E
- Capacity: 5,344 seats (basketball) c. 6,000 seats (concerts)
- Surface: Maple wood

Construction
- Groundbreaking: 18 March 1983
- Built: September 1983
- Opened: 24 September 1983

Tenants
- Universo Treviso Basket (2014–present); Imoco Volley (2012–present)

Palaverde is an indoor sporting arena located in Villorba near Treviso, Italy. Opened in September 1983 it has been used mainly for basketball and volleyball.

== History ==
The Palaverde was constructed under the impulsion and with the funding of the Benetton Group. The professional basketball club they owned, Pallacanestro Treviso, had had to play in Padua because the arenas in Treviso, such as the Natatorio sports complex, were not up to the standards of the professional basketball leagues. Tired of the slow progress, if not end, of the municipality's efforts to offer a suitable arena, the Benetton family proceeded to have the arena built.

In addition to hosting basketball and volleyball (see tenants), the arena has been the venue for tennis, karate and dancing competitions whilst also hosting a number of major concerts from artists such as Duran Duran, Tears for Fears, The Cure, Oasis, The Cranberries and Marilyn Manson. It was chosen to host the 2011 Eurocup Finals in April of that year, and the Italian Cup of women's volleyball Final Four in 2014.

== Structure ==
The Canadian maple wood court is built into the ground, sitting 15 meters below street level which ensures that all seats have a clear view of the court, over which hangs an NBA style cubic scoreboard with four giant screens. The arena has three VIP lounges, six dressing rooms for players, two for referees and judges, a weight room, a physician's area, a press room and a TV interview room in addition to extensive parking spaces outside.

For concerts, the capacity is upped by a thousand seats as part of the court can be used to give a capacity of more than 6,000, there are three dressing rooms specifically designed for events.

== Tenants ==
It was the home of Benetton Treviso from its opening until the club ceased professional activities in 2012, also hosting Sisley Treviso, another Benetton sponsored club, from 1987 to 2011 and neighbours Reyer Venezia basketball club during the 2011–12 season whilst they were upgrading their stadium.

Since 2012 it has hosted Imoco Volley, a women's professional volleyball club, and since 2014, Universo Treviso Basket, who have replaced Benetton Basket as the city's professional basketball club.
