= Torin Francis =

American professional basketball player

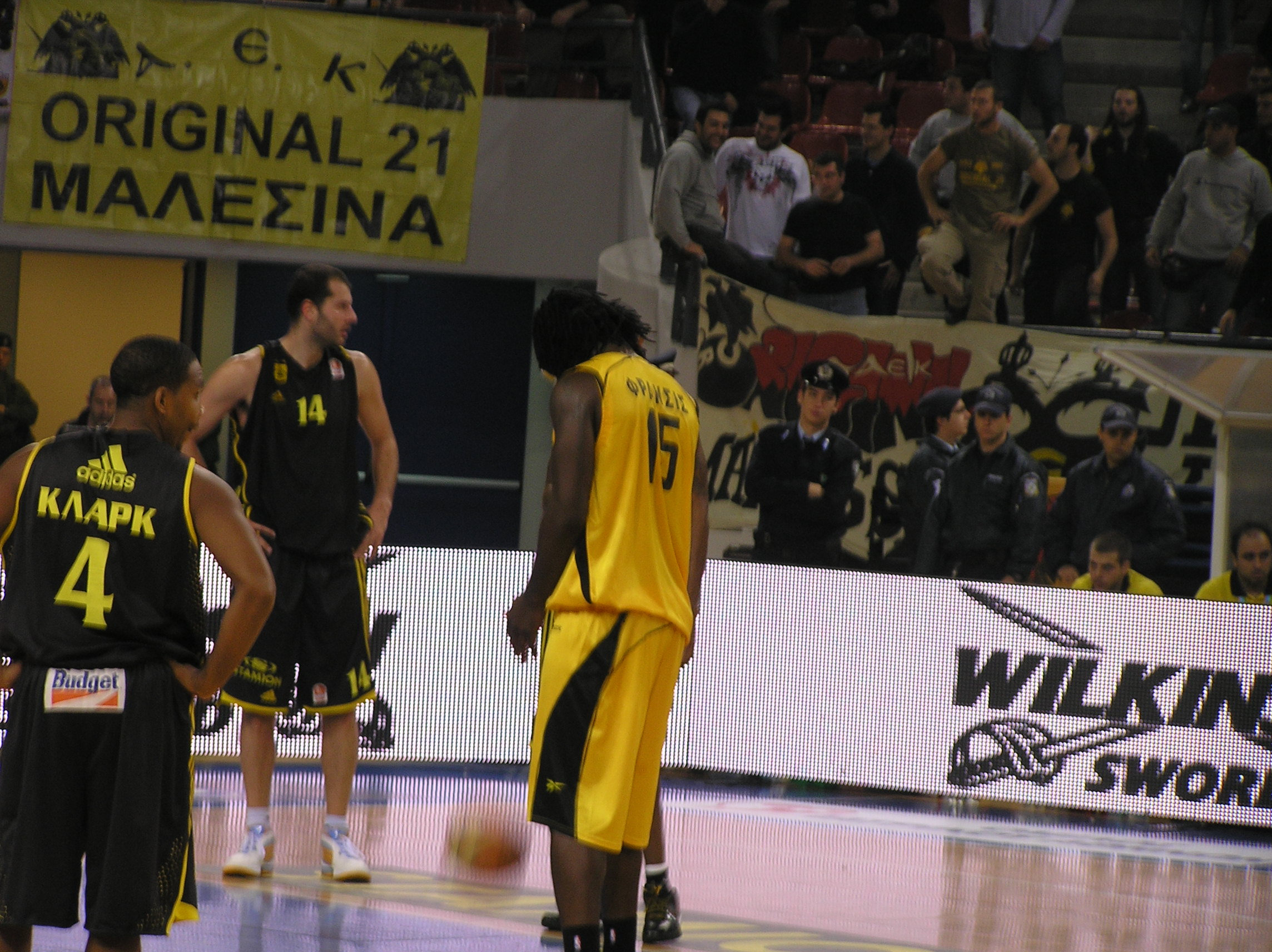
- Francis at the free throw line while with AEK.

No. 4 – Club La Unión
- Position: Center
- League: Liga Nacional de Básquet

Personal information
- Born: June 26, 1983 (age 43) Roslindale, Massachusetts, U.S.
- Listed height: 6 ft 10.75 in (2.10 m)
- Listed weight: 260 lb (118 kg)

Career information
- High school: Boston Latin (Boston, Massachusetts); Tabor Academy (Marion, Massachusetts)
- College: Notre Dame (2002–2006)
- NBA draft: 2006: undrafted
- Playing career: 2006–present

Career history
- 2006–2007: Orlandina Basket
- 2007–2008: Cantù
- 2008–2009: AEL 1964
- 2009: Hapoel Jerusalem
- 2009–2010: AEK Athens
- 2010–2011: Bornova Belediye
- 2011: Panellinios
- 2011–2012: Alba Berlin
- 2012–2013: Aliağa Petkim
- 2013–2014: Olin Edirne
- 2014–2015: Spirou Charleroi
- 2015–present: La Union de Formosa

Career highlights
- All-Greek League Defensive Team (2009); Morgan Wootten National Player of the Year (2002); McDonald's All-American (2002); Second-team Parade All-American (2002)

Torin Jamal Francis (born June 26, 1983) is an American professional basketball player for La Union de Formosa of the Argentine Basketball League. He is 6 ft 10 3/4 in (2.102 m) tall and he plays at the center position. He has played professionally in Greece, Israel, Germany, Turkey, Belgium, and Italy.

== College career ==
Francis played college basketball in the United States at the University of Notre Dame with the Notre Dame Fighting Irish.

== Pro career ==
During his professional career, Francis has played with the Italian League clubs Orlandina Basket and Cantù. He has also played with the Greek League clubs AEL 1964, AEK Athens, and Panellinios Basket. He has also played with the Israeli League club Hapoel Jerusalem and the Turkish League club Bornova Belediye.

He was signed by Panellinios in January 2011.

In July 2011 he signed a two-year contract with Alba Berlin in Germany.

In the summer of 2012, he signed a contract with Aliağa Petkim.

On November 26, 2014, he signed with Belgian team Spirou Charleroi.

In November 2015, he signed with Argentinian team La Union de Formosa.

== The Basketball Tournament (TBT) ==
In the summer of 2017, Francis, for the fourth year in a row, competed in The Basketball Tournament on ESPN for D.C. on Point. Competing for the $2 million grand prize, Ramón scored 15 points and grabbed nine rebounds in 30 minutes of play as D.C. on Point fell 80–75 to Team FOE, a Philadelphia based team coached by NBA forwards Markieff and Marcus Morris. Prior to 2017, Francis competed for Southern Hospitality in 2016 and for the Notre Dame Fighting Alumni in 2014 and 2015.
