= DaShaun Wood =

American professional basketball player (born 1985)

Personal information
- Born: September 29, 1985 (age 40) Detroit, Michigan, U.S.
- Listed height: 6 ft 1 in (1.85 m)
- Listed weight: 167 lb (76 kg)

Career information
- High school: Crockett (Detroit, Michigan)
- College: Wright State (2003–2007)
- NBA draft: 2007: undrafted
- Playing career: 2007–2017
- Position: Point guard

Career history
- 2007–2008: Pallacanestro Cantù
- 2008–2009: Pallacanestro Treviso
- 2010–2011: Skyliners Frankfurt
- 2011–2013: Alba Berlin
- 2013–2014: Le Mans Sarthe
- 2014–2015: Tofaş
- 2015–2016: Cholet Basket
- 2016–2017: Limoges CSP

Career highlights
- Basketball Bundesliga MVP (2011); 2× BBL Best Offensive Player (2011–2012); 2× All-BBL Team (2011, 2012); German Cup winner (2013); Leaders Cup winner (2014); Horizon League Player of the Year (2007)

DaShaun Sheldon Wood (born September 29, 1985) is an American former professional basketball player. Standing at 6 ft 1 in (1.85 m), he played at the point guard position.

== College career ==
DaShaun Lynch grew up in Detroit, where he went to Crockett High School. Soon after joining the Wright State Raiders in 2003, he changed his family name from "Lynch" to "Wood", his father's name. In his senior year, Wood led the Raiders to the Horizon League championship and, subsequently, its second-ever NCAA tournament appearance. He had also been the league's top scorer during the regular season and was named its Player of the Year, the first Raider to achieve that feat.

== Professional career ==
After being left unselected in the 2007 NBA draft, Wood began his professional career by signing with the Italian club Pallacanestro Cantù. He soon emerged as one of the best players in the Lega Basket Serie A and finished the season as one of only two players in the league scoring more than 600 points during that year. The following year, Wood played for another Italian club, Pallacanestro Treviso, but, soon after joining Treviso, suffered a sore tendon caused by a bone spur in the knee, which forced him to sit out for two months and continued to hamper him for the rest of the season. In order to fully recover from the injury, he did not play for any professional team during the 2009–10 season. Wood joined the German club Skyliners Frankfurt in 2010, leading the Bundesliga in points scored and claiming the Bundesliga MVP award for the 2010–11 season. After the departure of coach Gordon Herbert, Wood joined him at his new club Alba Berlin. In June 2013, he signed with Le Mans Sarthe Basket. In July 2014, he signed with Tofaş for the 2014–15 season. From 2015 he plays in France. He played for Cholet Basket, Limoges CSP and from July 2017 for SLUC Nancy Basket. On November 29, 2017, he parted ways with Nancy before appearing in a game for them.
