= KK Cedevita in European competitions =

KK Cedevita history and statistics in FIBA Europe and Euroleague Basketball (company) competitions.

Record	Round	Opponent club		
2007–08 FIBA EuroCup 3rd–tier
1–1	First qualifying round	(North Macedonia) Strumica 2005	76–72 (h)	69–75 (a)
2008–09 FIBA EuroChallenge 3rd–tier
1–1	First qualifying round	(France) Hyères-Toulon	92–82 (h)	58–75 (a)
2009–10 FIBA EuroChallenge 3rd–tier
2–4	Regular season	(Cyprus) Proteas EKA AEL	73–81 (a)	100–82 (h)
2–4	Regular season	(France) Élan Chalon	83–89 (h)	77–80 (a)
2–4	Regular season	(Belgium) Dexia Mons-Hainaut	85–71 (h)	64–85 (a)
2010–11 Eurocup Basketball 2nd–tier
12–6
12–6	Qualifying round	(Russia) Dynamo Moscow	97–61 (a)	72–73 (h)
12–6	Regular season	(Israel) Hapoel Gilboa Galil	83–92 (h)	84–73 (a)
12–6	Regular season	(Greece) Aris BSA 2003	81–76 (h)	76–85 (a)
12–6	Regular season	(Ukraine) BC Azovmash	72–69 (a)	88–84 (h)
12–6	TOP 16	(Serbia) Hemofarm	73–86 (a)	73–71 (h)
12–6	TOP 16	(Russia) UNICS Kazan	76–94 (h)	88–84 (a)
12–6	TOP 16	(Spain) Gran Canaria 2014	114–110 (h)	89–86 (a)
12–6	Quarterfinals	(Spain) Asefa Estudiantes	90–81 (h)	81–72 (a)
12–6	Semifinals	(Russia) UNICS Kazan	66–87 (Palaverde, Treviso)	
12–6	3rd place game	(Italy) Benetton Basket Bwin	59–57 (Palaverde, Treviso)	
2011–12 Eurocup Basketball 2nd–tier
2–6
2–6	Qualifying round	(France) Élan Chalon	73–78 (a)	84–69 (h)
2–6	Regular season	(Russia) Spartak St. Petersburg	56–73 (a)	68–73 (h)
2–6	Regular season	(Germany) Bayern Munich	70–64 (h)	65–80 (a)
2–6	Regular season	(Italy) Benetton Treviso	86–87 (h)	68–82 (a)
2012–13 Euroleague 1st–tier
2–8
2–8	Regular season	(Lithuania) Žalgiris	62–90 (a)	108–106 (h)
2–8	Regular season	(Italy) EA7 Milano	71–83 (h)	60–75 (a)
2–8	Regular season	(Turkey) Anadolu Efes	66–85 (a)	73–81 (h)
2–8	Regular season	(Greece) Olympiacos	77–79 (a)	62–84 (h)
2–8	Regular season	(Spain) Caja Laboral	76–69 (h)	70–97 (a)
2013–14 Eurocup Basketball 2nd–tier
8–8
8–8	Regular season	(Spain) Bilbao Basket	77–82 (a)	89–79 (h)
8–8	Regular season	(Belgium) Spirou Charleroi	88–75 (h)	72–64 (a)
8–8	Regular season	(Germany) EWE Baskets Oldenburg	90–92 (a)	64–72 (h)
8–8	Regular season	(Italy) Banco di Sardegna Sassari	94–83 (h)	68–77 (a)
8–8	Regular season	(France) Élan Chalon	80–65 (a)	75–71 (h)
8–8	Last 32	(Spain) CAI Zaragoza	75–67 (a)	74–77 (h)
8–8	Last 32	(Lithuania) Lietuvos Rytas	83–84 (h)	74–75 (a)
8–8	Last 32	(Turkey) Beşiktaş Integral Forex	69–71 (h)	58–55 (h)
2014–15 Euroleague 1st–tier
3–7
3–7	Regular season	(Spain) Unicaja	63–78 (h)	73–82 (a)
3–7	Regular season	(France) Limoges	60–71 (a)	102–83 (h)
3–7	Regular season	(Russia) CSKA Moscow	72–76 (h)	79–97 (a)
3–7	Regular season	(Israel) Maccabi Tel Aviv	83–73 (a)	71–82 (h)
3–7	Regular season	(Germany) Alba Berlin	67–80 (h)	70–67 (a)
2014–15 Eurocup Basketball 2nd–tier
4–4
4–4	Last 32	(Spain) CAI Zaragoza	83–80 (h)	84–85 (a)
4–4	Last 32	(Russia) Krasny Oktyabr	83–65 (a)	92–101 (h)
4–4	Last 32	(Italy) Acea Roma	73–66 (a)	91–90 (h)
4–4	Last 16	(Spain) Herbalife Gran Canaria	76–84 (h)	72–75 (a)
2015–16 Euroleague 1st–tier
8–16	Regular season	(Greece) Olympiacos	61–76 (a)	70–83 (h)
8–16	Regular season	(France) Limoges	80–84 (h)	78–69 (a)
8–16	Regular season	(Turkey) Anadolu Efes	81–75 (a)	75–81 (h)
8–16	Regular season	(Italy) EA7 Emporio Armani Milan	77–68 (a)	82–85 (h)
8–16	Regular season	(Spain) Laboral Kutxa	76–67 (h)	70–92 (a)
8–16	Top 16	(Russia) Lokomotiv Kuban	75–89 (h)	63–87 (a)
8–16	Top 16	(Turkey) Darüşşafaka Doğuş	79–72 (a)	77–83 (h)
8–16	Top 16	(Spain) Unicaja	67–90 (a)	78–91 (h)
8–16	Top 16	(Turkey) Anadolu Efes	84–80 (h)	76–80 (a)
8–16	Top 16	(Turkey) Fenerbahçe	73–86 (a)	89–59 (h)
8–16	Top 16	(Greece) Panathinaikos	60–78 (h)	60–76 (a)
8–16	Top 16	(Serbia) Crvena zvezda Telekom	74–94 (a)	83–62 (h)
2016–17 EuroCup Basketball 2nd–tier
8–6
8–6	Regular season	(Spain) Herbalife Gran Canaria	76–101 (a)	97–90 (h)
8–6	Regular season	(Lithuania) Lietkabelis	76–80 (h)	69–68 (a)
8–6	Regular season	(North Macedonia) MZT Skopje Aerodrom	89–85 (a)	95–61 (h)
8–6	Regular season	(Russia) Nizhny Novgorod	92–77 (h)	84–82 (a)
8–6	Top 16	(Spain) Valencia Basket	86–89 (h)	58–71 (a)
8–6	Top 16	(Spain) Unicaja	59–73 (a)	74–71 (h)
8–6	Top 16	(Germany) ALBA Berlin	76–93 (a)	99–83 (h)
2017–18 EuroCup Basketball 2nd–tier
5–11
5–11	Regular season	(Italy) Fiat Torino	83–86 (h)	87–65 (a)
5–11	Regular season	(Turkey) Darüşşafaka	83–85 (a)	89–83 (h)
5–11	Regular season	(Spain) MoraBanc Andorra	91–73 (h)	71–78 (a)
5–11	Regular season	(Russia) UNICS	94–74 (h)	61–78 (a)
5–11	Regular season	(France) Levallois Metropolitans	91–81 (a)	94–79 (h)
5–11	Top 16	(Italy) Dolomiti Energia Trento	72–83 (a)	77–81 (h)
5–11	Top 16	(Montenegro) Budućnost VOLI	75–78 (h)	52–84 (a)
5–11	Top 16	(Russia) Lokomotiv Kuban	64–69 (a)	60–85 (h)
2018–19 EuroCup Basketball 2nd–tier
5–11
5–11	Regular season	(France) Limoges	68–82 (a)	91–71 (h)
5–11	Regular season	(Germany) ALBA Berlin	75–73 (h)	109–102 (a)
5–11	Regular season	(Poland) Arka Gdynia	78–61 (a)	94–87 (h)
5–11	Regular season	(Russia) Lokomotiv Kuban	81–85 (h)	76–80 (a)
5–11	Regular season	(Turkey) Tofaş	89–94 (a)	92–96 (h)
5–11	Top 16	(Spain) MoraBanc Andorra	81–87 (h)	81–87 (a)
5–11	Top 16	(Russia) Zenit Saint Petersburg	84–98 (a)	75–79 (a)
5–11	Top 16	(Russia) UNICS	70–105 (a)	83–100 (h)

== Record ==
KK Cedevita has overall, from 2007–08 (first participation) to 2018–19 (last participation): 59 wins against 89 defeats in 148 games for all the European club competitions.

- 1st-tier: EuroLeague: 13–31 (44)
- 2nd-tier: EuroCup: 44–51 (95)
- 3rd-tier: FIBA EuroChallenge: 4–6 (10)
