= Eurocup Basketball 2010–11 Regular Season Group D =

Sports event

Standings and results for Group D of the regular season phase of the 2010–11 Eurocup basketball tournament.

== Standings ==
Key to colors
Top two places in each group advance to Last 16

	Team	Pld	W	L	PF	PA	Diff
1.	(Greece) Aris BSA 2003	6	5	1	514	462	+52
2.	(Croatia) Cedevita Zagreb	6	4	2	484	479	+5
3.	(Ukraine) BC Azovmash	6	2	4	492	504	−12
4.	(Israel) Hapoel Gilboa Galil	6	1	5	492	537	−45

Source: Euroleague Basketball

== Fixtures and results ==
All times given below are in Central European Time.

=== Game 1 ===
16 November 2010
20:00

Report

Aris BSA 2003 (Greece)	88–75	(Ukraine) BC Azovmash
Scoring by quarter: 23–16, 17–16, 18–21, 30–22
Pts: Tucker 28; Rebs: Pierce 8 Asts: Charalampidis 4		Pts: Curry 22; Rebs: Demetrius 12; Asts: Demetrius 5

Alexandreio Melathron
Attendance: 2,500
Referees: Milivoje Jovcic (SRB), Rustu Nuran (TUR), Aleksandar Milojevik (MKD)

16 November 2010
20:15

Report

Cedevita Zagreb (Croatia)	83–92	(Israel) Hapoel Gilboa Galil
Scoring by quarter: 17–22, 22–27, 22–18, 22–25
Pts: Kovačević 16; Rebs: Edwards 10; Asts: Draper 5		Pts: McClinton 18; Rebs: Green 9 Asts: Green 8

SD Sutinska vrela
Attendance: 1,000
Referees: Juan Carlos Garcia Gonzalez (ESP), Marcin Kowalski (POL), Ioannis Foufis (GRE)

=== Game 2 ===
23 November 2010
17:00

Report

BC Azovmash (Ukraine)	69–72	(Croatia) Cedevita Zagreb
Scoring by quarter: 17–20, 14–21, 20–20, 18–11
Pts: Curry 26; Rebs: Owens 12; Asts: Skutyelnik 4		Pts: Vukušić 19; Rebs: Vukušić 11; Asts: Draper 9

Sportkompleks Illichivets
Attendance: 2,890
Referees: Andrej Jersan (SLO), Seffi Shemmesh (ISR), Moritz Reiter (GER)

23 November 2010
18:00

Report

Hapoel Gilboa Galil (Israel)	83–92	(Greece) Aris BSA 2003
Scoring by quarter: 12–22, 24–16, 27–23, 20–31
Pts: McClinton 20; Rebs: Carter 9 Asts: Mekel 6		Pts: Tapoutos, Tucker 24; Rebs: Tucker 10; Asts: Tapoutos, Sloukas 4

Malha Arena
Attendance: 300
Referees: Tolga Sahin (TUR), Damir Javor (SLO), Radomir Vojinovic (MNE)

=== Game 3 ===
30 November 2010
18:00

Report

Hapoel Gilboa Galil (Israel)	86–95	(Ukraine) BC Azovmash
Scoring by quarter: 18–26, 22–23, 19–22, 27–24
Pts: Yivzori 18; Rebs: Mekel, Rodney Green 6 Asts: Mekel 11		Pts: Demetrius 31; Rebs: House 7 Asts: Curry 6

Malha Arena
Attendance: 50
Referees: Jakub Zamojski (POL), Marko Juras (SRB), Miroslav Tomov (BUL)

30 November 2010
20:30

Report

Cedevita Zagreb (Croatia)	81–76 (OT)	(Greece) Aris BSA 2003
Scoring by quarter: 15–14, 20–22, 23–15, 12–19, Overtime: 11–6
Pts: Rudež 24; Rebs: Edwards 8 Asts: Princ 5		Pts: Charalampidis, Borovnjak 15; Rebs: Tucker 11; Asts: Tucker 3

SD Sutinska vrela
Attendance: 1,500
Referees: Luigi Lamonica (ITA), Roman Kolar (SLO), Carmelo Lo Guzzo (ITA)

=== Game 4 ===
7 December 2010
17:00

Report

BC Azovmash (Ukraine)	92–88 (OT)	(Israel) Hapoel Gilboa Galil
Scoring by quarter: 25–17, 14–18, 18–22, 16–16, Overtime: 19–15
Pts: House 17; Rebs: Curry, House 8 Asts: Skutelnyk 6		Pts: McClinton 20; Rebs: Wilkerson 8 Asts: Mekel 8

Sportkompleks Illichivets
Attendance: 2,750
Referees: Andrej Lovsyn (SLO), Tomas Jasevicius (LTU), Olegs Latisevs (LAT)

7 December 2010
20:00

Report

Aris BSA 2003 (Greece)	85–76	(Croatia) Cedevita Zagreb
Scoring by quarter: 22–20, 18–10, 24–25, 21–21
Pts: Charalampidis 16; Rebs: Tapoutos 8 Asts: Sloukas 7		Pts: Rudež 23; Rebs: Plaisted 6 Asts: Troha 6

Alexandreio Melathron
Attendance: 2,000
Referees: Jose Martin (ESP), Petar Obradovic (BIH), Omer Esteron (ISR)

=== Game 5 ===
14 December 2010
17:00

Report

BC Azovmash (Ukraine)	77–82	(Greece) Aris BSA 2003
Scoring by quarter: 22–24, 17–19, 15–22, 23–17
Pts: Thomas 15; Rebs: Owens 7 Asts: Curry 5		Pts: Tucker 18; Rebs: Dunston, Tapoutos 8 Asts: Three players 4

Sportkompleks Illichivets
Attendance: 1,750
Referees: Sasa Maricic (SRB), Petri Mantyla (FIN), Igor Dragojevic (MNE)

14 December 2010
18:00

Report

Hapoel Gilboa Galil (Israel)	73–84	(Croatia) Cedevita Zagreb
Scoring by quarter: 23–18, 14–25, 17–15, 19–26
Pts: McClinton 15; Rebs: Carter 9 Asts: Mekel, Green 3		Pts: Baždarić 17; Rebs: Draper 8 Asts: Draper 5

Gan Ner Sports Hall
Attendance: 600
Referees: Recep Ankarali (TUR), Milija Vojinovic (SRB), Marius Ciulin (ROM)

=== Game 6 ===
21 December 2010
20:00

Report

Cedevita Zagreb (Croatia)	88–84	(Ukraine) BC Azovmash
Scoring by quarter: 24–20, 18–24, 27–22, 19–18
Pts: Draper 32; Rebs: Edwards 9 Asts: Draper 7		Pts: Owens 29; Rebs: Alexander 10; Asts: Curry, Alexander 4

SD Sutinska vrela
Attendance: 2,000
Referees: Marek Cmikiewicz (POL), Enrico Sabetta (ITA), Carmelo Paternico (ITA)

21 December 2010
20:00

Report

Aris BSA 2003 (Greece)	91–70	(Israel) Hapoel Gilboa Galil
Scoring by quarter: 21–25, 21–20, 26–10, 23–15
Pts: Brown 19; Rebs: Tapoutos, Borovnjak 6 Asts: Sloukas 6		Pts: Gree, Kazarnovski 14; Rebs: Carter, Kazarnovski 4 Asts: Mekel 3

Alexandreio Melathron
Attendance: 1,400
Referees: Juan Carlos Mitjana (ESP), Dragan Neskovic (SRB), Moritz Reiter (GER)
