= Eurocup Basketball 2010–11 Last 16 Group I =

Standings and results for Group I of the last 16 phase of the 2010–11 Eurocup basketball tournament.

== Standings ==
Key to colors
Top two places in each group advance to the Quarterfinals

	Team	Pld	W	L	PF	PA	Diff	Tie-break
1.	(Russia) UNICS Kazan	6	4	2	492	459	+33	1–1 (+14)
2.	(Croatia) Cedevita Zagreb	6	4	2	513	531	−18	1–1 (−14)
3.	(Spain) Gran Canaria 2014	6	2	4	482	484	−2	1–1 (+5)
4.	(Serbia) KK Hemofarm	6	2	4	453	466	−13	1–1 (−5)

== Fixtures and results ==
All times given below are in Central European Time.

=== Game 1 ===
18 January 2011
17:00

Report

UNICS Kazan (Russia)	67–64	(Spain) Gran Canaria 2014
Scoring by quarter: 16–16, 12–16, 15–12, 24–20
Pts: Minard 16; Rebs: Rizvić 9 Asts: Lyday 3		Pts: Carroll 22; Rebs: Rey 7 Asts: Wallace 6

Basket Hall Arena, Kazan
Attendance: 3,500
Referees: Borys Ryzhyk (UKR), Alfred Jovovic (CRO), Marius Ciulin (ROM)

19 January 2011
18:00

Report

KK Hemofarm (Serbia)	86–73	(Croatia) Cedevita Zagreb
Scoring by quarter: 32–15, 18–14, 19–14, 17–30
Pts: Jordan 19; Rebs: Savović, Borisov 8 Asts: Pavković 5		Pts: Wright 25; Rebs: Plaisted 6 Asts: Draper 4

Millennium Centar, Vršac
Attendance: 2,200
Referees: Matej Boltauzer (SLO), Marcin Kowalski (POL), Oscar Perea (ESP)

=== Game 2 ===
25 January 2011
20:30

Report

Cedevita Zagreb (Croatia)	76–94	(Russia) UNICS Kazan
Scoring by quarter: 23–26, 15–15, 19–35, 19–18
Pts: Draper 16; Rebs: Kaštropil 9 Asts: Draper 6		Pts: McCarty 22; Rebs: Rizvić, Lampe 8 Asts: Lyday 6

SD Sutinska vrela, Zagreb
Attendance: 1,000
Referees: Jakub Zamojski (POL), Roman Kolar (SLO), Elias Koromilas (GRE)

25 January 2011
21:30

Report

Gran Canaria 2014 (Spain)	72–66	(Serbia) KK Hemofarm
Scoring by quarter: 13–11, 21–15, 20–18, 18–22
Pts: Carroll 27; Rebs: Nelson 6 Asts: Bellas 4		Pts: Savović 13; Rebs: Borisov 9 Asts: Pavković 5

Centro Insular de Deportes, Las Palmas
Attendance: 2,700
Referees: Fernando Rocha (POR), Oscar Lefwerth (SWE), Jurgis Lauinavicius (LTU)

=== Game 3 ===
1 February 2011
18:00

Report

KK Hemofarm (Serbia)	83–84	(Russia) UNICS Kazan
Scoring by quarter: 24–17, 13–21, 18–21, 28–25
Pts: Savović 22; Rebs: Savović 8 Asts: Pavković 9		Pts: Lyday 28; Rebs: Veremeenko 11; Asts: Lyday 4

Millennium Centar, Vršac
Attendance: 2,000
Referees: Christos Christodoulou (GRE), Marek Cmikiewicz (POL), Tomas Trawicki (POL)

1 February 2011
20:00

Report

Cedevita Zagreb (Croatia)	114–110 (OT)	(Spain) Gran Canaria 2014
Scoring by quarter: 26–28, 17–21, 21–19, 32–28, Overtime: 18–14
Pts: Rudež 35; Rebs: Edwards 9 Asts: Draper 11		Pts: Carroll 28; Rebs: Rey 8 Asts: Green 7

SD Sutinska vrela, Zagreb
Attendance: 1,000
Referees: Volodymr Drabikovsky (UKR), Roberto Chiari (ITA), Rustu Nuran (TUR)

=== Game 4 ===
15 February 2011
17:00

Report

UNICS Kazan (Russia)	90–72	(Serbia) KK Hemofarm
Scoring by quarter: 32–17, 20–14, 17–18, 21–23
Pts: Lampe 19; Rebs: Lampe 6 Asts: Minard 6		Pts: Borisov 16; Rebs: Božović 10; Asts: Pavković, Božović 2

Basket Hall Arena, Kazan
Attendance: 2,000
Referees: Murat Biricik (TUR), Petar Obradovic (BIH), Sergiy Chebyshev (UKR)

15 February 2011
21:30

Report

Gran Canaria 2014 (Spain)	86–89	(Croatia) Cedevita Zagreb
Scoring by quarter: 24–28, 20–16, 17–23, 25–22
Pts: Carroll 27; Rebs: Nelson 8 Asts: Green 6		Pts: Wright, Rudež 23; Rebs: Edwards 11; Asts: Draper 10

Centro Insular de Deportes, Las Palmas
Attendance: 3,500
Referees: Tolga Sahin (ITA), Luis Lopes (POR), Carmelo Paternico (ITA)

=== Game 5 ===
22 February 2011
18:15

Report

Cedevita Zagreb (Croatia)	73–71	(Serbia) KK Hemofarm
Scoring by quarter: 25–24, 17–20, 18–10, 13–17
Pts: Edwards 17; Rebs: Baždarić 8 Asts: Draper 7		Pts: Jeremić 15; Rebs: Božović 13; Asts: Pavković 3

SD Sutinska vrela, Zagreb
Attendance: 2,000
Referees: Andrej Lovsyn (SLO), Robert Vyklicky (CZE), Renaud Geller (BEL)

22 February 2011
21:30

Report

Gran Canaria 2014 (Spain)	76–73	(Russia) UNICS Kazan
Scoring by quarter: 12–14, 31–24, 19–13, 14–22
Pts: Carroll 16; Rebs: Beiran 11; Asts: Wallace 4		Pts: Minard 19; Rebs: Lampe 8 Asts: Lyday, Veremeenko 3

Centro Insular de Deportes, Las Palmas
Attendance: 2,500
Referees: Zoran Sutulovic (MNE), Nicola Maestre (FRA), Joseph Bissang (FRA)

=== Game 6 ===
1 March 2011
18:00

Report

KK Hemofarm (Serbia)	75–74	(Spain) Gran Canaria 2014
Scoring by quarter: 14–20, 19–14, 20–15, 22–25
Pts: Pavković 16; Rebs: Božović 8 Asts: Pavković 6		Pts: Carroll 17; Rebs: Nelson 7 Asts: Nelson 5

Millennium Centar, Vršac
Attendance: 1,800
Referees: Dubravko Muhvic (CRO), Sinisa Herceg (CRO), Mrius Ciulin (ROM)

1 March 2011
19:30

Report

UNICS Kazan (Russia)	84–88	(Croatia) Cedevita Zagreb
Scoring by quarter: 22–22, 18–16, 24–18, 20–32
Pts: McCarty, Minard 21; Rebs: McCarty 7 Asts: Pashutin 7		Pts: Wright 27; Rebs: Vukušić 8 Asts: Princ 4

Basket Hall Arena, Kazan
Attendance: 1,500
Referees: Andrej Jersan (SLO), Boris Shugla (UKR), Rustu Nuran (TUR)
