= Eurocup 2013–14 Regular Season Group B =

Standings and Results for Group B of the Regular Season phase of the 2013–14 Eurocup basketball tournament.

== Standings ==
	Team	Pld	W	L	PF	PA	Diff	Tie-break
1.	(Italy) Banco di Sardegna Sassari	10	7	3	866	817	+49	
2.	(Croatia) Cedevita Zagreb	10	6	4	797	760	+37	
3.	(Spain) Bilbao Basket	10	5	5	855	826	+29	1–1 (+1)
4.	(Germany) EWE Baskets Oldenburg	10	5	5	789	797	–8	1–1 (–1)
5.	(France) Élan Chalon	10	4	6	779	786	–7	
6.	(Belgium) Spirou Charleroi	10	3	7	706	806	–100	

Source: Euroleague Basketball

== Fixtures and results ==
=== Game 1 ===
15 October 2013
20:30 CET

Boxscore

Bilbao Basket (Spain)	82–77	(Croatia) Cedevita Zagreb
Scoring by quarter: 15–18, 22–18, 24–17, 21–24
Pts: Mumbrú 19; Rebs: Mumbrú 8 Asts: Mumbrú 5		Pts: Smith 24; Rebs: Babić, Suton 5 Asts: Smith 6

Bilbao Arena, Bilbao
Attendance: 5,327
Referees: Ilija Belosevic (SRB), Luis Lopes (POR), Joseph Bissang (FRA)

16 October 2013
20:00 CET

Boxscore

EWE Baskets Oldenburg (Germany)	77–96	(Italy) Banco di Sardegna Sassari
Scoring by quarter: 17–33, 13–22, 23–21, 24–20
Pts: Aleksandrov, Kramer 16; Rebs: Kramer 6 Asts: Jenkins 6		Pts: Green 25; Rebs: Johnson 9 Asts: Diener 9

Large EWE Arena, Oldenburg
Attendance: 1,750
Referees: Seffi Shemmesh (ISR), Tomasz Trawicki (POL), Carlos Peruga (ESP)

16 October 2013
20:30 CET

Boxscore

Spirou Charleroi (Belgium)	59–83	(France) Élan Chalon
Scoring by quarter: 14–20, 8–15, 21–22, 16–26
Pts: Steinbach 11; Rebs: Green 7 Asts: Mallet 4		Pts: Slaughter 14; Rebs: Capela 10; Asts: Tchicamboud 6

Spiroudome, Charleroi
Attendance: 4,000
Referees: Tomas Jasevicius (LTU), Francisco Araña (ESP), Arnis Ozols (LAT)

=== Game 2 ===
22 October 2013
20:00 CET

Boxscore

Élan Chalon (France)	71–82	(Germany) EWE Baskets Oldenburg
Scoring by quarter: 22–22, 17–17, 15–18, 17–25
Pts: Brockman 20; Rebs: Brockman 11; Asts: Slaughter 6		Pts: Paulding 24; Rebs: Crosariol 5 Asts: Kramer 5

Le Colisée, Chalon-sur-Saône
Attendance: 4,000
Referees: Tolga Sahin (ITA), Carlos Cortes (ESP), Tomislav Hordov (CRO)

23 October 2013
18:00 CET

Boxscore

Cedevita Zagreb (Croatia)	88–75	(Belgium) Spirou Charleroi
Scoring by quarter: 23–21, 21–13, 22–16, 22–25
Pts: Smith 20; Rebs: Suton 7 Asts: Smith 5		Pts: Abukar 27; Rebs: Green 6 Asts: Mallet 6

Dom Sportova, Zagreb
Attendance: 1,200
Referees: Murat Biricik (TUR), Benjamin Jimenez (ESP), Saverio Lanzarini (ITA)

23 October 2013
20:30 CET

Boxscore

Banco di Sardegna Sassari (Italy)	94–100	(Spain) Bilbao Basket
Scoring by quarter: 18–25, 23–21, 20–11, 21–25
Pts: Diener 23; Rebs: C. Green, Sacchetti 7 Asts: M. Green 6		Pts: Kavaliauskas 21; Rebs: Kavaliauskas 9 Asts: López 8

Palasport Roberta Serradimigni, Sassari
Attendance: 2,518
Referees: Sreten Radovic (CRO), Regis Bardera (FRA), Saso Petek (SLO)

=== Game 3 ===
29 October 2013
20:30 CET

Boxscore

Bilbao Basket (Spain)	98–71	(Belgium) Spirou Charleroi
Scoring by quarter: 18–21, 21–17, 33–14, 26–19
Pts: Hervelle 17; Rebs: Samb 6 Asts: Grimau, Mumbrú 5		Pts: Green 20; Rebs: Abukar 6 Asts: Steinbach 7

Bilbao Arena, Bilbao
Attendance: 4,782
Referees: Milivoje Jovcic (SRB), Elias Koromilas (GRE), Petar Obradovic (BIH)

29 October 2013
20:30 CET

Boxscore

Banco di Sardegna Sassari (Italy)	102–87	(France) Élan Chalon
Scoring by quarter: 20–27, 38–27, 18–16, 26–17
Pts: D. Diener 23; Rebs: Green 7 Asts: T. Diener 13		Pts: Slaughter 22; Rebs: Capela 8 Asts: Evtimov 4

Palasport Roberta Serradimigni, Sassari
Attendance: 2,700
Referees: Robert Vyklicky (CZE), Miguel Angel Perez Niz (ESP), Milos Koljensic (MNE)

30 October 2013
20:00 CET

Boxscore

EWE Baskets Oldenburg (Germany)	92–90 (OT)	(Croatia) Cedevita Zagreb
Scoring by quarter: 14–19, 25–19, 16–25, 24–16, Overtime: 13–11
Pts: Jenkins 19; Rebs: three players 5 Asts: Joyce 8		Pts: Smith, Zubčić 22; Rebs: Zubčić 8 Asts: Smith 8

Large EWE Arena, Oldenburg
Attendance: 1,657
Referees: Miguel Perez Perez (ESP), Roberto Chiari (ITA), Haris Bijedic (BIH)

=== Game 4 ===
5 November 2013
20:30 CET

Boxscore

Bilbao Basket (Spain)	77–67	(France) Élan Chalon
Scoring by quarter: 27–14, 16–15, 18–21, 16–17
Pts: Gabriel 16; Rebs: Kavaliauskas 8 Asts: Mumbrú 4		Pts: Slaughter 19; Rebs: Brockman 5 Asts: Slaughter 7

Bilbao Arena, Bilbao
Attendance: 4,615
Referees: Fernando Rocha (POR), Spiros Gkontas (GRE), Nick Van Den Broeck (BEL)

6 November 2013
19:00 CET

Boxscore

Cedevita Zagreb (Croatia)	94–83	(Italy) Banco di Sardegna Sassari
Scoring by quarter: 22–32, 26–23, 14–24, 32–4
Pts: Smith 20; Rebs: Suton 10; Asts: Smith, Suton 5		Pts: Thomas 21; Rebs: Green, Johnson 6 Asts: Diener 7

Dom Sportova, Zagreb
Attendance: 1,052
Referees: Antonio Conde (ESP), Marius Ciulin (ROM), Omer Esteron (ISR)

6 November 2013
20:30 CET

Boxscore

Spirou Charleroi (Belgium)	53–70	(Germany) EWE Baskets Oldenburg
Scoring by quarter: 8–14, 15–22, 14–22, 16–12
Pts: Green 12; Rebs: Green 8 Asts: four players 4		Pts: Paulding 15; Rebs: Aleksandrov 10; Asts: Kramer 3

Spiroudome, Charleroi
Attendance: 1,200
Referees: Matej Boltauzer (SLO), Petri Mantyla (FIN), Markos Michaelides (GRE)

=== Game 5 ===
12 November 2013
20:00 CET

Boxscore

EWE Baskets Oldenburg (Germany)	91–86	(Spain) Bilbao Basket
Scoring by quarter: 25–22, 26–22, 25–22, 15–20
Pts: Paulding 21; Rebs: Crosariol 8 Asts: Kramer 7		Pts: Hervelle 19; Rebs: Kavaliauskas 6 Asts: López 6

Large EWE Arena, Oldenburg
Attendance: 2,360
Referees: Borys Ryzhyk (UKR), Aare Halliko (EST), Piotr Pastusiak (POL)

12 November 2013
20:00 CET

Boxscore

Élan Chalon (France)	65–80	(Croatia) Cedevita Zagreb
Scoring by quarter: 9–17, 20–17, 15–22, 21–24
Pts: Evtimov, Slaughter 14; Rebs: Evtimov 7 Asts: Slaughter 6		Pts: Smith 16; Rebs: Zubčić 7 Asts: Smith 5

Le Colisée, Chalon-sur-Saône
Attendance: 2,500
Referees: Jose Martin (ESP), Milija Vojinovic (SRB), Jasmina Juras (SRB)

13 November 2013
20:30 CET

Boxscore

Banco di Sardegna Sassari (Italy)	94–78	(Belgium) Spirou Charleroi
Scoring by quarter: 29–23, 20–24, 22–13, 23–18
Pts: D. Diener 23; Rebs: Green 9 Asts: T. Diener 7		Pts: Mallet 18; Rebs: Green, Mukubu 6 Asts: Mallet 5

Palasport Roberta Serradimigni, Sassari
Attendance: 2,678
Referees: Juan Carlos Garcia Gonzalez (ESP), Zdravko Rutesic (MNE), Tomislav Hordov (CRO)

=== Game 6 ===
19 November 2013
18:00 CET

Boxscore

Cedevita Zagreb (Croatia)	89–79	(Spain) Bilbao Basket
Scoring by quarter: 25–24, 22–21, 21–17, 21–17
Pts: Smith 13; Rebs: Bilan 8 Asts: Ray 5		Pts: Gabriel 17; Rebs: Carmichael 10; Asts: López 6

Dom Sportova, Zagreb
Attendance: 1,350
Referees: Robert Lottermoser (GER), Sergiy Zashchuk (UKR), David Romano (ISR)

19 November 2013
20:00 CET

Boxscore

Élan Chalon (France)	91–77	(Belgium) Spirou Charleroi
Scoring by quarter: 20–22, 14–19, 31–19, 26–17
Pts: Slaughter 20; Rebs: Evtimov 9 Asts: Tchicamboud 8		Pts: Mallet 17; Rebs: Abukar 5 Asts: Mallet 7

Le Colisée, Chalon-sur-Saône
Attendance: 2,200
Referees: Roberto Chiari (ITA), Apostolos Kalpakas (SWE), Oskars Lucis (LAT)

20 November 2013
20:30 CET

Boxscore

Banco di Sardegna Sassari (Italy)	82–74	(Germany) EWE Baskets Oldenburg
Scoring by quarter: 20–21, 14–15, 21–15, 27–23
Pts: D. Diener 21; Rebs: D. Diener, Johnson 6 Asts: M. Green 6		Pts: Crosariol 14; Rebs: Crosariol 7 Asts: three players 2

Palasport Roberta Serradimigni, Sassari
Attendance: 2,874
Referees: Radomir Vojinovic (SRB), Sergio Silva (POR), Josip Radojkovic (CRO)

=== Game 7 ===
26 November 2013
20:30 CET

Boxscore

Spirou Charleroi (Belgium)	64–72	(Croatia) Cedevita Zagreb
Scoring by quarter: 17–17, 12–18, 20–18, 15–19
Pts: Green, Abukar 13; Rebs: Green 13; Asts: Hamilton 3		Pts: Smith 23; Rebs: Four players 5 Asts: Smith 3

Spiroudome, Charleroi
Attendance: 1,000
Referees: Jose Ramon Garcia Ortiz (ESP), Tomasz Trawicki (POL), Clements Fritz (GER)

27 November 2013
20:00 CET

Boxscore

EWE Baskets Oldenburg (Germany)	73–83	(France) Élan Chalon
Scoring by quarter: 27–13, 12–22, 16–22, 18–26
Pts: Jenkins 20; Rebs: Aleksandrov 7 Asts: Kramer 5		Pts: Slaughter, Brockman 16; Rebs: Brockman 13; Asts: Tchicamboud, Slaughter 4

Large EWE Arena, Oldenburg
Attendance: 1,780
Referees: Tomas Jasevicius (LTU), Sasa Maricic (SRB), Tomislav Vovk (CRO)

27 November 2013
20:30 CET

Boxscore

Bilbao Basket (Spain)	91–93 (OT)	(Italy) Banco di Sardegna Sassari
Scoring by quarter: 18–14, 20–23, 22–23, 20–20, Overtime: 11–13
Pts: Gabriel 20; Rebs: Markota 10; Asts: López 6		Pts: Thomas 21; Rebs: Green 11; Asts: M. Green 6

Bilbao Arena, Bilbao
Attendance: 5,834
Referees: Luis Lopes (POR), Olegs Latisevs (LAT), Marek Cmikiewicz (POL)

=== Game 8 ===
3 December 2013
20:00 CET

Boxscore

Élan Chalon (France)	80–82	(Italy) Banco di Sardegna Sassari
Scoring by quarter: 22–28, 24–26, 15–12, 19–16
Pts: Slaughter 24; Rebs: N'Dumba-Capela 10; Asts: Tchicamboud 8		Pts: Green 19; Rebs: Thomas 7 Asts: T. Diener 6

Le Colisée, Chalon-sur-Saône
Attendance: 3,900
Referees: Juan Carlos Aretaga (ESP), Srdan Dozai (CRO), Haris Bijedic (BIH)

3 December 2013
20:30 CET

Boxscore

Spirou Charleroi (Belgium)	79–73	(Spain) Bilbao Basket
Scoring by quarter: 20–16, 19–20, 26–23, 14–14
Pts: Mallet 19; Rebs: Green, Watkins 9 Asts: Mallet 4		Pts: Bertāns 16; Rebs: López, Markota 5 Asts: López, Mumbrú 4

Spiroudome, Charleroi
Attendance: 1,200
Referees: Joseph Bissang (FRA), Tomas Jasevicius (LTU), Semen Ovinov (RUS)

4 December 2013
18:00 CET

Boxscore

Cedevita Zagreb (Croatia)	64–72	(Germany) EWE Baskets Oldenburg
Scoring by quarter: 16–16, 17–15, 14–15, 17–26
Pts: Smith 23; Rebs: Suton 7 Asts: Babić 6		Pts: Jenkins, Paulding 12; Rebs: Paulding 7 Asts: Joyce 5

Dom Sportova, Zagreb
Attendance: 2,100
Referees: Marek Cmikiewicz (POL), Miguel Angel Perez Niz (ESP), Saverio Lanzarini (ITA)

=== Game 9 ===
10 December 2013
20:00 CET

Boxscore

Élan Chalon (France)	81–79	(Spain) Bilbao Basket
Scoring by quarter: 24–17, 17–21, 17–21, 23–20
Pts: Aboudou 19; Rebs: Brockman 9 Asts: Joseph 8		Pts: Kavaliauskas 18; Rebs: Kavaliauskas, Mumbrú 10; Asts: López 9

Le Colisée, Chalon-sur-Saône
Attendance: 3,800
Referees: Fernando Rocha (POR), Piotr Pastusiak (POL), Nick van den Broeck (NED)

11 December 2013
20:00 CET

Boxscore

EWE Baskets Oldenburg (Germany)	74–82	(Belgium) Spirou Charleroi
Scoring by quarter: 21–21, 9–22, 23–19, 21–20
Pts: Crosariol 15; Rebs: Jenkins 7 Asts: Joyce 7		Pts: Mallet 17; Rebs: Watkins 14; Asts: Hamilton, Mallet 4

Large EWE Arena, Oldenburg
Attendance: 1,967
Referees: Luis Lopes (POR), Petri Mantyla (FIN), Jurgis Laurinavicius (LTU)

11 December 2013
20:30 CET

Boxscore

Banco di Sardegna Sassari (Italy)	77–68	(Croatia) Cedevita Zagreb
Scoring by quarter: 23–18, 12–16, 30–19, 12–15
Pts: Thomas 21; Rebs: Thomas 8 Asts: M. Green 8		Pts: Smith 19; Rebs: Ramljak, Ray 8 Asts: Ray 5

Palasport Roberta Serradimigni, Sassari
Attendance: 2,950
Referees: Elias Koromilas (GRE), Regis Bardera (FRA), Markos Michaelides (SUI)

=== Game 10 ===
17 December 2013
19:00 CET

Boxscore

Cedevita Zagreb (Croatia)	75–71	(France) Élan Chalon
Scoring by quarter: 20–17, 15–19, 17–23, 23–12
Pts: Smith 18; Rebs: Smith 8 Asts: Ray, Smith 4		Pts: Slaughter 19; Rebs: N'Dumba-Capela 10; Asts: Slaughter 5

Dom Sportova, Zagreb
Attendance: 1,916
Referees: Christos Christodoulou (GRE), Ersan Kartal (TUR), Carlos Peruga (ESP)

17 December 2013
20:30 CET

Boxscore

Spirou Charleroi (Belgium)	68–63	(Italy) Banco di Sardegna Sassari
Scoring by quarter: 23–30, 13–14, 16–5, 16–14
Pts: Trapani 24; Rebs: Watkins 14; Asts: Hamilton 4		Pts: Thomas 15; Rebs: Johnson 10; Asts: M. Green 6

Spiroudome, Charleroi
Attendance: 1,300
Referees: Miguel Perez Perez (ESP), Sinisa Herceg (SLO), Carlos Cortes (ESP)

18 December 2013
20:30 CET

Boxscore

Bilbao Basket (Spain)	90–84	(Germany) EWE Baskets Oldenburg
Scoring by quarter: 21–21, 25–20, 11–20, 33–23
Pts: Mumbrú 22; Rebs: Gabriel 7 Asts: four players 4		Pts: Jenkins 20; Rebs: Aleksandrov 6 Asts: Joyce 8

Bilbao Arena, Bilbao
Attendance: 8,431
Referees: Milivoje Jovcic (SRB), Elias Koromilas (GRE), Rustu Nuran (TUR)
