= Eurocup Basketball 2010–11 qualifying round =

This page describes the qualifying round for the Eurocup Basketball 2010–11.

The qualifying round consisted of one round, played in home and away series.

== Draw ==
There was a seeded draw. Teams were separated into two seeds according to the club ranking in the European competitions. The 1 Seed played the second game of each series at home. Teams entering the draw following a renouncement were seeded according to the club ranking. Teams granted a wild card by ECA were seeded above the rest of the teams.

1 Seeds	2 Seeds
(Greece) Aris	(Turkey) Galatasaray Café Crown
(Russia) Dynamo Moscow	(Belgium) Belgacom Liège
(Italy) Benetton Basket Bwin	(Bulgaria) Lukoil Academic
(Spain) Gran Canaria 2014	(France) Entente Orléanaise
(Russia) BC Spartak	(Croatia) Cedevita Zagreb
(Ukraine) BC Azovmash Mariupol	(Croatia) KK Zagreb
(Turkey) Beşiktaş Cola Turka	(Germany) Deutsche Bank Skyliners
(Israel) Hapoel Jerusalem	(Cyprus) APOEL Nicosia

== Matches ==
Team #1	Agg.	Team #2	1st leg	2nd leg
Beşiktaş Cola Turka (Turkey)	152–137	(Germany) Deutsche Bank Skyliners	68–61	84–76
Hapoel Jerusalem (Israel)	146–132	(Belgium) Belgacom Liege	62–59	84–73
Aris (Greece)	170–167	(Bulgaria) Lukoil Academic	78–74	92–93
Gran Canaria 2014 (Spain)	165–131	(Croatia) KK Zagreb	69–71	96–60
BC Azovmash (Ukraine)	155–145	(France) Entente Orléanaise	76–80	79–65
BC Spartak SPB (Russia)	136–139	(Turkey) Galatasaray Café Crown	58–69	78–70
Benetton Basket Bwin (Italy)	181–118	(Cyprus) APOEL Nicosia	97–55	84–63
Dynamo Moscow (Russia)	134–169	(Croatia) Cedevita Zagreb	61–97	73–72

=== First leg ===
September 28
19:30 UTC+3

Report

APOEL Nicosia (Cyprus)	55–97	(Italy) Benetton Basket Bwin
Scoring by quarter: 12–17, 15–29, 14–22, 14–29
Pts: Fisher 17; Rebs: Vitas 7 Asts: Hanavan 3		Pts: Brunner 19; Rebs: Brunner 9 Asts: Marković 8

Lefkotheo, Nicosia
Attendance: 500
Referees: B Ryzhyk (UKR), L Lopes (POR), C Mateus (FRA)

September 28
20:30 UTC+2

Report

Belgacom Liege (Belgium)	59–62	(Israel) Hapoel Jerusalem
Scoring by quarter: 13–14, 13–17, 19–9, 14–22
Pts: Bozeman 14; Rebs: Gillet, Stipanovic 6 Asts: Collette 2		Pts: Solomon 15; Rebs: Kokia 9 Asts: Naimy 3

Country Hall Ethias Liège, Liège
Referees: O Schmidt (GER), Ó Perea (ESP), C Cziffra (HUN)

September 29
18:00 UTC+3

Report

Lukoil Academic (Bulgaria)	74–78	(Greece) Aris BSA 2003
Scoring by quarter: 19–14, 18–19, 24–25, 13–20
Pts: Bowman 18; Rebs: Stoykov, Peterson 6 Asts: James 6		Pts: Tucker 26; Rebs: Tucker 13; Asts: Pierce 5

Universiada Hall, Sofia
Attendance: 2,200
Referees: S Radovic (CRO), O Latisevs (LAT), M Juras (SRB)

September 29
19:00 UTC+3

Report

Galatasaray Café Crown (Turkey)	69–58	(Russia) BC Spartak SPB
Scoring by quarter: 15–11, 21–18, 15–12, 18–17
Pts: three players 12; Rebs: Shipp, Rančík 6 Asts: Açık 6		Pts: Zupan 14; Rebs: Thompson 8 Asts: Ponkrashov 7

Abdi İpekçi Arena, Istanbul
Attendance: 2,000
Referees: M Pérez (ESP), D Chambon (FRA), I Dragojevic (MNE)

September 29
19:30 UTC+2

Report

Deutsche Bank Skyliners (Germany)	61–68	(Turkey) Beşiktaş Cola Turka
Scoring by quarter: 16–16, 21–14, 11–18, 13–20
Pts: Wood 15; Rebs: Moye 7 Asts: Wood 3		Pts: Ogilvy 23; Rebs: Özer 13; Asts: Yarangüme, Erden 3

Ballsporthalle, Frankfurt
Referees: L Lamonica (ITA), S Silva (POR), J Forsberg (SWE)

September 29
20:00 UTC+2

Report

KK Zagreb (Croatia)	71–69	(Spain) Gran Canaria 2014
Scoring by quarter: 18–20, 11–20, 20–11, 22–18
Pts: Kasun 17; Rebs: Žorić 12; Asts: Simon 3		Pts: Wallace 13; Rebs: Nelson 8 Asts: three players 2

Sportska dvorana Trnsko, Zagreb
Attendance: 1,200
Referees: F Facchini (ITA), R Geller (BEL), H Jones (WAL)

September 29
20:30 UTC+2

Report

Entente Orléanaise (France)	80–76	(Ukraine) BC Azovmash
Scoring by quarter: 20–15, 24–18, 15–21, 21–22
Pts: Bell 18; Rebs: Moerman, Smith 5 Asts: three players 6		Pts: Curry 24; Rebs: Pustozvonov 13; Asts: Curry 5

Zénith d'Orléans, Orléans
Attendance: 2,500
Referees: S Pukl (SLO), M Ciulin (ROU), N Somos (GRE)

September 29
20:00 UTC+2

Report

Cedevita Zagreb (Croatia)	97–61	(Russia) Dynamo Moscow
Scoring by quarter: 29–13, 25–14, 26–21, 17–13
Pts: Baždarić 21; Rebs: Draper, Edwards 7 Asts: Draper 7		Pts: Zhukanenko 18; Rebs: Zhukanenko 12; Asts: Khvostov 5

SD Sutinska vrela, Zagreb
Attendance: 1,500
Referees: S Shemmesh (ISR), A Milojevik (MKD), E Mogulkoc (TUR)

=== Second leg ===
October 5
19:30 UTC+3

Report

Beşiktaş Cola Turka (Turkey)	84–76	(Germany) Deutsche Bank Skyliners
Scoring by quarter: 23–11, 15–18, 15–29, 31–18
Pts: Ogilvy 17; Rebs: Yarangüme 7 Asts: Erden 5		Pts: Moye 20; Rebs: Moye, Nolte 6 Asts: Wood 7

BJK Akatlar Arena, Istanbul
Attendance: 200
Referees: Javor (SLO), Foufis (GRE), Cici (ALB)

Beşiktaş Cola Turka won 152-137 on aggregate

October 5
19:00 UTC+3

Report

Hapoel Jerusalem (Israel)	84–73	(Belgium) Belgacom Liege
Scoring by quarter: 23–20, 20–18, 21–11, 20–24
Pts: Randle 16; Rebs: Kokia 11; Asts: Ohayon 5		Pts: Jenkins 19; Rebs: Matela 6 Asts: Jenkins 5

Malha Arena, Jerusalem
Attendance: 2,300
Referees: Jovcic (SRB), Christodoulou (GRE), Syrytsa (BLR)

Hapoel Jerusalem won 146-132 on aggregate

October 6
20:00 UTC+3

Report

Aris BSA 2003 (Greece)	92–93	(Bulgaria) Lukoil Academic
Scoring by quarter: 22–24, 25–26, 25–22, 20–21
Pts: Hatzivrettas 19; Rebs: Tucker 13; Asts: Pierce 4		Pts: Heath 23; Rebs: Peterson 12; Asts: James 7

Alexandrio Melathron, Thessaloniki
Attendance: 4,000
Referees: Belosevic (SRB), García (ESP), Reiter (GER)

Aris BSA 2003 won 170-167 on aggregate

October 6
20:30 UTC+1

Report

Gran Canaria 2014 (Spain)	96–60	(Croatia) KK Zagreb
Scoring by quarter: 27–10, 28–19, 19–14, 22–17
Pts: Carroll 24; Rebs: Wallace 13; Asts: Bellas 7		Pts: Renfroe 14; Rebs: Kasun 5 Asts: three players 2

Centro Insular, Las Palmas de Gran Canaria
Attendance: 3,835
Referees: Paternico (ITA), Zurapovic (BIH), Jeanneau (FRA)

Gran Canaria 2014 won 165-131 on aggregate

October 6
18:00 UTC+3

Report

BC Azovmash (Ukraine)	79–65	(France) Entente Orléanaise
Scoring by quarter: 22–18, 12–8, 25–19, 20–20
Pts: Pustozvonov 28; Rebs: Thomas 6 Asts: Alexander 6		Pts: N'Doye 13; Rebs: Moerman 5 Asts: three players 4

Sportkompleks Illichivets, Mariupol
Attendance: 2,600
Referees: Dolinek (CZE), Koromilas (GRE), Jovovic (CRO)

BC Azovmash won 155-145 on aggregate

October 6
20:30 UTC+3

Report

BC Spartak SPB (Russia)	78–70	(Turkey) Galatasaray Café Crown
Scoring by quarter: 23–11, 15–22, 18–20, 22–17
Pts: Domercant 14; Rebs: Thompson, Zupan 7 Asts: Ponkrashov 4		Pts: Shumpert 22; Rebs: Shipp 6 Asts: Açık 3

Yubileyny, St. Petersburg
Attendance: 2,500
Referees: Mazic (SRB), Kowalski (POL), Lucis (LAT)

Galatasaray Café Crown won 139-136 on aggregate

October 6
20:30 UTC+2

Report

Benetton Basket Bwin (Italy)	84–63	(Cyprus) APOEL Nicosia
Scoring by quarter: 22–6, 21–16, 19–18, 22–23
Pts: Perić, Wojciechowski 16; Rebs: Wojciechowski 9 Asts: Bulleri, Gentile 3		Pts: Fisher 25; Rebs: Davis 6 Asts: four players 1

Palaverde, Treviso
Attendance: 1,525
Referees: Bulto (ESP), Bertrand (SUI), Vovk (CRO)

Benetton Basket Bwin won 181-118 on aggregate

October 6
19:30 UTC+3

Report

Dynamo Moscow (Russia)	73–72	(Croatia) Cedevita Zagreb
Scoring by quarter: 20–22, 20–13, 15–25, 18–12
Pts: Zhukanenko 17; Rebs: Gubanov 8 Asts: Urazmanov 4		Pts: Edwards 18; Rebs: Pettway 9 Asts: Draper 9

Krylatskoe Sport Palace, Moscow
Attendance: 1,500
Referees: Kennerman (TUR), Jersan (SLO), Laurinavicius (LTU)

Cedevita Zagreb won 169-134 on aggregate
