= Eurocup Basketball 2011–12 Regular Season Group G =

Standings and Results for Group G of the Regular Season phase of the 2011–12 Eurocup basketball tournament.

== Standings ==
Key to colors
Top two teams advance to Last 16

	Team	Pld	W	L	PF	PA	Diff
1.	(Russia) Spartak Saint Petersburg	6	6	0	477	401	+76
2.	(Italy) Benetton Treviso	6	3	3	478	476	+2
3.	(Germany) Bayern Munich	6	2	4	404	436	−32
4.	(Croatia) Cedevita	6	1	5	413	459	−46

== Fixtures and results ==
All times given below are in Central European Time.

=== Game 1 ===
15 November 2011
16:00

Report

Spartak St. Petersburg (Russia)	73–56	(Croatia) KK Cedevita
Scoring by quarter: 10–12, 17–15, 24–12, 22–17
Pts: Beverley 21; Rebs: Zupan 8 Asts: Halperin, Keyru 4		Pts: Owens, Warren 11; Rebs: Smodiš 4 Asts: Car 5

Yubileyny Sports Palace, Saint Petersburg
Attendance: 2,500
Referees: Andrej Jersan (SLO), Sergiy Zashchuck (UKR), Jurgis Laurinavicius (LTU)

15 November 2011
20:00

Report

Bayern Munich (Germany)	72–62	(Italy) Benetton Treviso
Scoring by quarter: 19–13, 17–18, 20–15, 16–16
Pts: Foster 14; Rebs: Troutman 10; Asts: Hamann 4		Pts: Gentile 19; Rebs: Adrien 11; Asts: Mekel 4

Rudi-Sedlmayer-Halle, Munich
Attendance: 3,019
Referees: Grzegorz Ziemblick (POL), Oskars Lucis (LAT), Haris Bijedic (BIH)

=== Game 2 ===
22 November 2011
18:30

Report

KK Cedevita (Croatia)	70–64	(Germany) Bayern Munich
Scoring by quarter: 17–13, 16–17, 21–18, 16–16
Pts: Draper 15; Rebs: Vukušić, Warren 6 Asts: Draper 4		Pts: Troutman 18; Rebs: Troutman 8 Asts: five players 1

Dom Sportova, Zagreb
Attendance: 1,000
Referees: Miguel Angel Perez Niz (ESP), Murat Biricik (TUR), Omer Esteron (ISR)

22 November 2011
20:45

Report

Benetton Treviso (Italy)	78–87	(Russia) Spartak St. Petersburg
Scoring by quarter: 11–17, 11–24, 27–21, 29–25
Pts: Adrien 22; Rebs: Adrien 10; Asts: Bulleri 4		Pts: Mavrokefalidis 23; Rebs: Likhodey 6 Asts: Beverley 3

Palaverde, Treviso
Attendance: 2,816
Referees: Vicente Bulto (ESP), Seffi Shemmesh (ISR), Roman Kolar (SLO)

=== Game 3 ===
29 November 2011
16:00

Report

Spartak St. Petersburg (Russia)	75–62	(Germany) Bayern Munich
Scoring by quarter: 20–10, 16–7, 17–19, 22–17
Pts: Beverley 17; Rebs: Dragičević 7 Asts: Halperin 6		Pts: Benzing 16; Rebs: Jagla 8 Asts: Hamann 6

Yubileyny Sports Palace, Saint Petersburg
Attendance: 2,100
Referees: Sinisa Herceg (CRO), Anastasios Piloidis (GRE), Aare Halliko (EST)

29 November 2011
20:00

Report

KK Cedevita (Croatia)	86–87 (OT)	(Italy) Benetton Treviso
Scoring by quarter: 25–16, 19–25, 16–17, 14–16, Overtime: 12–13
Pts: Bilan 19; Rebs: Bilan 11; Asts: Draper 4		Pts: Moldoveanu 19; Rebs: Adrien 10; Asts: Bečirović 8

Dom Sportova, Zagreb
Attendance: 2,500
Referees: Emilio Perez Pizarro (ESP), Zdravko Rutesic (MNE), Rustu Nuran (TUR)

=== Game 4 ===
6 December 2011
20:00

Report

Bayern Munich (Germany)	60–72	(Russia) Spartak St. Petersburg
Scoring by quarter: 10–20, 18–19, 21–17, 11–16
Pts: Troutman 15; Rebs: Benzing 8 Asts: Hansbrough 3		Pts: Mavrokefalidis, Keyru 13; Rebs: Halperin 6 Asts: Halperin 6

Rudi-Sedlmayer-Halle, Munich
Attendance: 3,218
Referees: Christos Christodoulou (GRE), Marko Juras (SRB), Zdravko Rutesic (MNE)

6 December 2011
20:45

Report

Benetton Treviso (Italy)	82–68	(Croatia) KK Cedevita
Scoring by quarter: 26–7, 13–20, 22–24, 21–17
Pts: Gentile 18; Rebs: Adrien, Gentile 6 Asts: Bečirovič 6		Pts: Draper 17; Rebs: three players 5 Asts: three players 2

Palaverde, Treviso
Attendance: 2,204
Referees: J.R. Garcia Ortiz (ESP), Nicola Maestre (FRA), Sergey Zashchuk (UKR)

=== Game 5 ===
13 December 2011
18:00

Report

KK Cedevita (Croatia)	68–73	(Russia) Spartak St. Petersburg
Scoring by quarter: 12–16, 19–21, 23–15, 14–21
Pts: Bilan 16; Rebs: Bilan 8 Asts: Baždarić 4		Pts: Dragičević 16; Rebs: Dragičević, Mavrokefalidis 6 Asts: Halperin 7

Dom Sportova, Zagreb
Attendance: 800
Referees: Jakub Zamojski (POL), Panagiotis Anastopoulos (GRE), Jurgis Laurinavicius (LTU)

13 December 2011
20:45

Report

Benetton Treviso (Italy)	92–66	(Germany) Bayern Munich
Scoring by quarter: 27–15, 24–13, 25–22, 16–16
Pts: Adrien 16; Rebs: Gentile 7 Asts: De Nicolao, Gentile 3		Pts: Homan 14; Rebs: Troutman 5 Asts: Hamann 3

Palaverde, Treviso
Attendance: 2,074
Referees: Daniel Hierrezuelo (ESP), Radomir Vojinovic (MNE), Andrej Lovsin (SLO)

=== Game 6 ===
20 November 2011
16:00

Report

Spartak St. Petersburg (Russia)	97–77	(Italy) Benetton Treviso
Scoring by quarter: 23–14, 24–25, 30–19, 20–19
Pts: Dragičević 21; Rebs: Beverley 8 Asts: Beverley 10		Pts: Thomas 22; Rebs: Wojciechowski 5 Asts: De Nicolao 4

Yubileyny Sports Palace, Saint Petersburg
Attendance: 1,600
Referees: Murat Biricik (TUR), Olegs Latisevs (LAT), Aare Halliko (EST)

20 December 2011
20:00

Report

Bayern Munich (Germany)	80–65	(Croatia) KK Cedevita
Scoring by quarter: 25–17, 21–10, 13–16, 21–22
Pts: Homan 18; Rebs: Homan 11; Asts: Hamann 8		Pts: Draper 15; Rebs: Bagarić 7 Asts: Petrović, Princ 2

Rudi-Sedlmayer-Halle, Munich
Attendance: 3,937
Referees: Tomas Jasevicius (LTU), Sasa Maricic (SRB), Ademir Zurapovic (BIH)
