= 2008–09 FIBA EuroChallenge First qualifying round =

2008–09 FIBA EuroChallenge First Qualifying Round are the first qualifying round for the 2008–09 FIBA EuroChallenge season, There are only 32 teams, who will play two games. The Winners go to the second qualifying round

== Bracket ==
#	Team #1	Agg.	Team #2	1st leg	2nd leg
B	BK Prostějov (Czech Republic)	134-148	(Croatia) KK Zagreb	61-69	73-79
C	KK AMAK (North Macedonia)	148-145	(Slovenia) Zlatorog Laško	70-76	78-69
D	CSU Asesoft (Romania)	147-145	(Russia) Spartak	79-76	68-69
E	U-Mobitelco Cluj (Romania)	132-163	(Germany) EWE Baskets	60-86	72-77
F	Svendborg Rabbits (Denmark)	168-180	(Bosnia and Herzegovina) HKK Široki	92-100	76-80
H	MBC Mykolaiv (Ukraine)	138-151	(Germany) DB Skyliners	68-75	70-76
I	Energy Invest (Georgia (country))	160-200	(Ukraine) Sumykhimprom	81-110	79-90
J	Spartak Pleven (Bulgaria)	153-176	(Turkey) Antalya Basket	83-87	70-89
K	APOEL (Cyprus)	113-135	(France) JA Vichy	52-66	61-69
L	CSU Sibiu (Romania)	144-186	(Turkey) Banvit	67-74	77-112
M	Cedevita Zagreb (Croatia)	150-157	(France) Hyères-Toulon	92-82	58-75
N	Körmend (Hungary)	171-201	(Netherlands) EiffelTowers Den Bosch	71-88	100-113
O	BC Donetsk (Ukraine)	120-134	(Cyprus) AEL	65-65	55-79
P	Bakken Bears (Denmark)	119-164	(Belgium) Liege Basket	55-67	64-97

== Results ==
=== Game B ===
October 14
18:00

(Report)

BK Prostějov (Czech Republic)	61–69	(Croatia) KK Zagreb
Scoring by quarter: 21-26, 15-23, 15-4, 10-16
Pts: Beechum 14; Rebs: Beechum 8 Asts: Savanovic, Beechum 3		Pts: Tomic 16; Rebs: Tomic 14; Asts: Tomic 4

Sportcentrum Prostějov-DDM, Prostějov
Attendance: 1328
Referees: Grzegorz Ziemblicki(POL), Joseph Bissang(FRA), Damir Javor(SLO)

October 21
18:00

(Report)

KK Zagreb (Croatia)	79–73	(Czech Republic) BK Prostějov
Scoring by quarter: 16-20, 14-13, 23-15, 26-25
Pts: Simon 23; Rebs: Tomic 19; Asts: Simon 4		Pts: Ames 20; Rebs: Pruitt 12; Asts: Ames 4
KK Zagreb win series, Agg. 148–134

SD Transko, Zagreb
Attendance: 1500
Referees: Vladimir Tsekov(BUL), Milan Brziak(SVK), Rüstü Nuran (TUR)

=== Game C ===
October 14
20:30

(Report)

KK AMAK (North Macedonia)	70–76	(Slovenia) Zlatorog Laško
Scoring by quarter: 23-17, 15-18, 13-20, 19-21
Pts: Bogojev 20; Rebs: Cubrilo 8 Asts: Bogojev 4		Pts: Miljkovic 18; Rebs: Miljkovic 8 Asts: Strnad 3

Arena of ZKK Profitnes-Ohrid, Ohrid
Attendance: 1500
Referees: Christos Christodoulou(GRE), Marko Juras(SRB), Doru Vinasi(ROU)

October 21
19:00

(Report)

Zlatorog Laško (Slovenia)	69–78	(North Macedonia) KK AMAK
Scoring by quarter: 13-20, 21-18, 24-20, 11-20
Pts: Berdier Aponte 16; Rebs: Lučić 7 Asts: Berdier Aponte 4		Pts: Cubrilo 20; Rebs: Cubrilo 9 Asts: Bogojev 4
KK AMAK wins series, Agg. 148–145

Tri Lilije Hall, Laško
Attendance: 600
Referees: Milan Mazic(SRB), Igor Dragojevic(MNE), Tomislav Vovk(CRO)

=== Game D ===
October 14
20:30

(Report)

CSU Asesoft (Romania)	79–76	(Russia) Spartak Saint Petersburg
Scoring by quarter: 25-24, 17-14, 19-18, 18-20
Pts: Burlacu 19; Rebs: Burlacu 8 Asts: Burlacu, Osmokrovic 3		Pts: Meshcharakou 28; Rebs: Blair 8 Asts: Wisniewski 10

Olimpia Hall, Ploiești
Attendance: 2000
Referees: Ilija Belosevic(SRB), Marko Vuckovic(SLO), Sergiy Zashchuk(UKR)

October 21
18:00

(Report)

Spartak Saint Petersburg (Russia)	69–68	(Romania) CSU Asesoft
Scoring by quarter: 11-18, 17-11, 23-18, 18-21
Pts: Wisniewski 20; Rebs: Blair, Wisniewski 5 Asts: Wisniewski 5		Pts: Burlacu 25; Rebs: Carutasu 9 Asts: Osmokrovic 4
CSU Asesoft wins series, Agg. 147–145

Yubileyny Sports Palace, Saint Petersburg
Attendance: 2500
Referees: Juris Kokainis(LAT), Peter Bodnar(HUN), Gil Oved(ISR)

=== Game E ===
October 14
18:30

(Report)

U-Mobitelco Cluj (Romania)	60–86	(Germany) EWE Baskets
Scoring by quarter: 16-21, 14-19, 15-21, 15-25
Pts: Cuic 17; Rebs: Osby 9 Asts: Cuic, Henry, Gibson 3		Pts: Paulding 20; Rebs: Marko Scekic 6 Asts: Miladin Pekovic 4

Sala Sporturilor "Horia Demian", Cluj-Napoca
Attendance: 2800
Referees: Petar Obradovic(BIH), Emin Mogulkoc(TUR), Milan Brziak(SVK)

October 21
20:00

(Report)

EWE Baskets (Germany)	77–72	(Romania) U-Mobitelco Cluj
Scoring by quarter: 28-17, 8-25, 23-13, 18-17
Pts: Paulding 19; Rebs: Paulding 13; Asts: Gardner 4		Pts: Cuic, Osby 18; Rebs: Osby, Gibson 6 Asts: Cuic 7
EWE Baskets wins series, Agg. 163–132

EWE Arena, Oldenburg
Attendance: 2040
Referees: Mauro Pozzana(ITA), Marek Cmikiewicz(POL), Alexey Davydov(RUS)

=== Game F ===
October 14
20:00

(Report)

Svendborg Rabbits (Denmark)	92–100	(Bosnia and Herzegovina) HKK Široki
Scoring by quarter: 26-28, 22-18, 29-26, 15-28
Pts: Smith 39; Rebs: Höger 11; Asts: Smith 10		Pts: Spralja 34; Rebs: Naletec 5 Asts: Sumic 10

Svendborg Idraetscenter, Svendborg
Attendance: 1226
Referees: Daniel Hierrezuelo (ESP), Benjamin Barth(GER), Chris Dodds(SCO)

October 21
20:00

(Report)

HKK Široki (Bosnia and Herzegovina)	80–76	(Denmark) Svendborg Rabbits
Scoring by quarter: 21-19, 28-25, 11-12, 20-20
Pts: Braswell 18; Rebs: Spralja 12; Asts: Braswell, Sumic 6		Pts: Smith 19; Rebs: Höger, Smith 11; Asts: Smith 8
HKK Široki wins series, Agg. 180–168

Pecara, Široki Brijeg
Referees: Tolga Sahin(ITA), Radomir Vojinovic(MNE), Albi Greva(ALB)

=== Game H ===
October 14
19:00

(Report)

MBC Mykolaiv (Ukraine)	68–75	(Germany) D. Bank Skyliners
Scoring by quarter: 13-16, 22-18, 17-22, 16-19
Pts: Gladyr 15; Rebs: Hlebowicki 10; Asts: Rayevskyy, Hlebowicki 3		Pts: Simmons 17; Rebs: Simmons 13; Asts: Evtimov 3

Sports School "Nadezhda", Mykolaiv
Attendance: 1900
Referees: Daniel Hierrezuelo (ESP), Benjamin Barth(GER), Chris Dodds(SCO)

October 21
19:30

(Report)

D. Bank Skyliners (Germany)	76–70	(Ukraine) MBC Mykolaiv
Scoring by quarter: 25-16, 22-18, 11-20, 18-16
Pts: Evtimov 17; Rebs: Allen 10; Asts: Roller 7		Pts: Gladyr 24; Rebs: Hlebowicki; Asts: Hlebowicki 3
Deutsche Bank Skyliners wins series, Agg. 151 –138

Ballsporthalle Frankfurt, Frankfurt
Attendance: ???
Referees: Christos Mastraftsis(GRE), Ronny Denis(BEL), Tomasz Trawicki(POL)

=== Game N ===
October 14
20:00

(Report)

Polaroid Körmend (Hungary)	71–88	(Netherlands) EiffelTowers Den Bosch
Scoring by quarter: 14-24, 21-16, 20-29, 16-19
Pts: Banks 21; Rebs: Auriantal 9 Asts: Auriantal 6		Pts: Beasley 25; Rebs: Gilles 12; Asts: Oliver 7

Szentély Aréna, Körmend
Attendance: 1800
Referees: Luigi Lamonica(ITA), Robert Paulik(CZE), Florin Grigoras(ROU)

October 21
20:00

(Report)

EiffelTowers Den Bosch (Netherlands)	113–100	(Hungary) Polaroid Körmend
Scoring by quarter: 23-28, 36-16, 29-29, 25-27
Pts: Richardson 27; Rebs: Richardson 8 Asts: Oliver 10		Pts: Auriantal 28; Rebs: Keresztes 4 Asts: Fodor 4
EiffelTowers Den Bosch wins series, Agg. 201 –171

Maaspoort Sports end Events, 's-Hertogenbosch
Attendance: 1500
Referees: Gianluca Mattioli(ITA), Neil Wilkinson(ENG), Sigmundur Herbertsson(ISL)
