= Eurocup Basketball 2013–14 Last 32 Group P =

Standings and Results for Group P of the Last 32 phase of the 2013–14 Eurocup basketball tournament.

== Standings ==
	Team	Pld	W	L	PF	PA	Diff	Tie-break
1.	(Lithuania) Lietuvos Rytas	6	4	2	491	492	–1	1–1 (+19)
2.	(Turkey) Beşiktaş Integral Forex	6	4	2	441	452	–11	1–1 (-19)
3.	(Croatia) Cedevita Zagreb	6	2	4	433	429	+4	1–1 (+5)
4.	(Spain) CAI Zaragoza	6	2	4	453	445	+8	1–1 (–5)

== Fixtures and results ==
=== Game 1 ===
8 January 2014
18:00 CET

Boxscore

Lietuvos Rytas (Lithuania)	101–103	(Turkey) Beşiktaş Integral Forex
Scoring by quarter: 18–31, 28–22, 21–28, 34–22
Pts: Gecevičius 24; Rebs: Palacios 8 Asts: Cook 10		Pts: Lofton 23; Rebs: Iverson 6 Asts: Gaines 7

Siemens Arena, Vilnius
Attendance: 4,100
Referees: Ilija Belošević (SRB), Sergiy Zashchuk (UKR), Radomir Vojinović (MNE)

8 January 2014
20:30 CET

Boxscore

CAI Zaragoza (Spain)	67–75	(Croatia) Cedevita Zagreb
Scoring by quarter: 15–21, 18–23, 15–10, 19–21
Pts: Jones 20; Rebs: Shermadini 8 Asts: Llompart 4		Pts: Ray 17; Rebs: Suton, Zubčić 5 Asts: three players 4

Pabellón Príncipe Felipe, Zaragoza
Attendance: 6,819
Referees: Spiros Gkontas (GRE), Aare Halliko (EST), Piotr Pastusiak (POL)

=== Game 2 ===
15 January 2014
19:00 CET

Boxscore

Beşiktaş Integral Forex (Turkey)	70–63	(Spain) CAI Zaragoza
Scoring by quarter: 12–17, 19–15, 22–16, 17–15
Pts: Lofton 19; Rebs: Buckman 16; Asts: Gaines 7		Pts: Rudež 14; Rebs: Sanikidze 8 Asts: Llompart 4

BJK Akatlar Arena, Istanbul
Attendance: 1,650
Referees: Saša Pukl (SLO), Andrej Lovšin (SLO), Alexey Davydov (RUS)

15 January 2014
19:00 CET

Boxscore

Cedevita Zagreb (Croatia)	83–84	(Lithuania) Lietuvos Rytas
Scoring by quarter: 26–22, 24–24, 20–17, 13–21
Pts: Bilan 19; Rebs: six players 4 Asts: Babić, Ray 5		Pts: Seibutis 17; Rebs: Palacios 10; Asts: Cook 10

Dom Sportova, Zagreb
Attendance: 2,437
Referees: Dani Hierrezuelo (ESP), Luis Lopes (POR), Semen Ovinov (RUS)

=== Game 3 ===
21 January 2014
20:30 CET

Boxscore

CAI Zaragoza (Spain)	94–60	(Lithuania) Lietuvos Rytas
Scoring by quarter: 27–15, 23–16, 27–14, 17–15
Pts: Roll 23; Rebs: Jones 8 Asts: Llompart, Roll 5		Pts: Palacios 17; Rebs: Palacios 6 Asts: Cook 5

Pabellón Príncipe Felipe, Zaragoza
Attendance: 6,725
Referees: Murat Biricik (TUR), Anastasios Piloidis (GRE), Zdravko Rutešić (MNE)

22 January 2014
19:00 CET

Boxscore

Cedevita Zagreb (Croatia)	69–71	(Turkey) Beşiktaş Integral Forex
Scoring by quarter: 19–12, 25–25, 8–16, 17–18
Pts: Ray 17; Rebs: Smith, Suton 8 Asts: Smith 5		Pts: Lofton 20; Rebs: Perkins 10; Asts: Perkins 7

Dom Sportova, Zagreb
Attendance: 1,464
Referees: Seffi Shemmesh (ISR), Marcin Kowalski (POL), Ioannis Foufis (GRE)

=== Game 4 ===
28 January 2014
19:00 CET

Boxscore

Lietuvos Rytas (Lithuania)	87–75	(Spain) CAI Zaragoza
Scoring by quarter: 27–20, 25–26, 14–16, 21–13
Pts: Gecevičius 22; Rebs: Gecevičius 6 Asts: Cook 8		Pts: Norel 16; Rebs: Shermadini 6 Asts: Rudež 4

Siemens Arena, Vilnius
Attendance: 3,300
Referees: Andrej Jersan (SLO), Siniša Herceg (CRO), Apostolos Kalpakas (SWE)

29 January 2014
19:00 CET

Boxscore

Beşiktaş Integral Forex (Turkey)	55–58	(Croatia) Cedevita Zagreb
Scoring by quarter: 15–12, 12–23, 15–9, 13–14
Pts: Lofton 11; Rebs: Ružić 8 Asts: Perkins 7		Pts: Babić, Ray 9 Rebs: Suton 9 Asts: three players 3

BJK Akatlar Arena, Istanbul
Attendance: 2,350
Referees: Christos Christodoulou (GRE), Tomas Jasevicius (LTU), Miroslav Tomov (BUL)

=== Game 5 ===
12 February 2014
19:00 CET

Boxscore

Cedevita Zagreb (Croatia)	74–77	(Spain) CAI Zaragoza
Scoring by quarter: 16-20, 19-15, 15-15, 24-27
Pts: Nurkić 18; Rebs: Zubčić 4 Asts: Baždarić 5		Pts: Tabù 15; Rebs: Jones, Shermadini 6 Asts: Llompart 8

Dom Sportova, Zagreb
Attendance: 1,432
Referees: Fernando Rocha (POR), Sergio Silva (POR), Markos Michelidis (SUI)

12 February 2014
19:00 CET

Boxscore

Beşiktaş Integral Forex (Turkey)	63–84	(Lithuania) Lietuvos Rytas
Scoring by quarter: 16-22, 17-16, 9-20, 21-26
Pts: Perkins 17; Rebs: Perkins 11; Asts: Lofton 3		Pts: Palacios 22; Rebs: Palacios 7 Asts: Cook 7

BJK Akatlar Arena, Istanbul
Attendance: 1,662
Referees: Jose Ramon Garcia Ortiz (ESP), Petar Obradović (BIH), Petros Papapetrou (GRE)

=== Game 6 ===
19 February 2014
18:00 CET

Boxscore

Lietuvos Rytas (Lithuania)	75–74	(Croatia) Cedevita Zagreb
Scoring by quarter: 16-15, 25-12, 16-25, 18-22
Pts: Seibutis 15; Rebs: Songaila 6 Asts: Cook 6		Pts: Smith 17; Rebs: Suton 7 Asts: Smith 5

Siemens Arena, Vilnius
Attendance: 5,150
Referees: Grzegorz Ziemblicki (POL), Marius Ciulin (ROM), Oskars Lucis (LAT)

19 February 2014
20:30 CET

Boxscore

CAI Zaragoza (Spain)	77–79	(Turkey) Beşiktaş Integral Forex
Scoring by quarter: 9-21, 32-15, 14-20, 22-23
Pts: Sanikidze 25; Rebs: Sanikidze 8 Asts: Roll 4		Pts: Lofton 25; Rebs: Güler, Perkins 6 Asts: Perkins 3

Palacio Municipal de Deportes, Huesca
Attendance: 4,100
Referees: Robert Lottermoser (GER), Saša Maričić (SRB), Saverio Lanzarini (ITA)
