= 2001–02 ABA Goodyear League =

2001–02 ABA Goodyear League season
- League: ABA Goodyear League
- Sport: Basketball
- Teams: Croatia (4 teams); Slovenia (4 teams); Bosnia and Herzegovina (3 teams) (Federal Republic of Yugoslavia) FR Yugoslavia (1 team)

Regular season
- Season champions: (Slovenia) Olimpija
- Season MVP: (Croatia) Marino Baždarić (Triglav osiguranje)
- Top scorer: (Croatia) Marino Baždarić (Triglav osiguranje) (26.23 ppg)

Final 4
- Champions: (Slovenia) Olimpija
- Runners-up: (Slovenia) Krka

ABA Goodyear League seasons
- 2002–03 →

12 teams from Bosnia and Herzegovina, Croatia, Serbia and Montenegro and Slovenia participated in Goodyear League in its first season: Union Olimpija, Krka, Pivovarna Laško, Geoplin Slovan, Cibona VIP, Zadar, Triglav Osiguranje, Split Croatia Osiguranje, FEAL Široki, Bosna ASA, Sloboda Dita, Budućnost.

In February 2002 ABA was admitted as an equal member of the ULEB association.

There were 22 rounds played in the regular part of the season, best four teams qualified for the Final Four Tournament which was played in Ljubljana on March 23 and 24 2002.

The first trophy in Goodyear League was won by Union Olimpija.

== Regular season ==
Pos	Team	Pld	W	L	PF	PA	PD	Pts	Qualification or relegation
1	(Slovenia) Union Olimpija	22	20	2	1898	1505	+393	42	Qualified for Final four
2	(Slovenia) Krka	22	16	6	1902	1698	+204	38	Qualified for Final four
3	(Croatia) Cibona VIP	22	16	6	1897	1703	+194	38	Qualified for Final four
4	(Slovenia) Pivovarna Laško	22	15	7	1848	1744	+104	37	Qualified for Final four
5	(Bosnia and Herzegovina) Sloboda Dita	22	12	10	1645	1677	−32	34	Relegated
6	(Bosnia and Herzegovina) FEAL Široki	22	12	10	1805	1741	+64	34	
7	(Croatia) Zadar	22	12	10	1811	1814	−3	34	
8	(Croatia) Split CO	22	10	12	1774	1830	−56	32	
9	(Federal Republic of Yugoslavia) Budućnost	22	9	13	1666	1758	−92	31	Relegated
10	(Croatia) Triglav osiguranje	22	5	17	1746	1950	−204	27	Relegated
11	(Slovenia) Geoplin Slovan	22	3	19	1689	1890	−201	25	Relegated
12	(Bosnia and Herzegovina) Bosna ASA	22	2	20	1443	1814	−371	24	

== Final four ==
Matches played at Hala Tivoli, Ljubljana

Semifinals; March 23
1	(Slovenia) Union Olimpija	69
4	(Slovenia) Pivovarna Laško	56
2	(Slovenia) Krka	98
3	(Croatia) Cibona VIP	93

Final; March 24
1	(Slovenia) Union Olimpija	73
2	(Slovenia) Krka	59

2001–02 ABA Godyear League Champions
(Slovenia)
Union Olimpija
1st title

== Stats leaders ==
=== Ranking MVP ===
Rank	Name	Team	Efficiency	Games	Average
1.	(Croatia) Marino Baždarić	(Croatia) Triglav osiguranje	388	22	17.64
2.	(Croatia) Stipe Šarlija	(Bosnia and Herzegovina) FEAL Široki	347	21	16.52
3.	(Croatia) Mate Skelin	(Slovenia) Krka	348	23	15.13
4.	(Croatia) Matej Mamić	(Croatia) Cibona Vip	327	20	13.90
5.	(United States) Bennett Davison	(Slovenia) Krka	318	23	13.83

=== Points ===
Rank	Name	Team	Points	Games	PPG
1.	(Croatia) Marino Baždarić	(Croatia) Triglav osiguranje	577	22	26.23
2.	(Croatia) Stipe Šarlija	(Bosnia and Herzegovina) FEAL Široki	388	21	18.48
3.	(Croatia) Davor Marcelić	(Croatia) Zadar	285	16	17.81
4.	(Slovenia) Alojzij Duščak	(Slovenia) Pivovarna Laško	366	21	17.43
5.	(Croatia) Andrija Žižić	(Croatia) Split CO	366	22	16.86

=== Rebounds ===
Rank	Name	Team	Rebounds	Games	RPG
1.	(Croatia) Ante Grgurević	(Croatia) Split CO	194	21	9.24
2.	(Croatia) Mate Skelin	(Slovenia) Krka	192	23	8.35
3.	(Croatia) Nikola Prkačin	(Croatia) Cibona Vip	143	22	6.50
4.	(Senegal) Soulymane Wane	(Bosnia and Herzegovina) Sloboda Dita	138	22	6.27
5.	(Croatia) Stipe Šarlija	(Croatia) FEAL Široki	128	21	6.10

=== Assists ===
Rank	Name	Team	Assists	Games	APG
1.	(United States) Rumeal Robinson	(Croatia) Zadar	50	12	4.17
2.	(Serbia and Montenegro) Dragan Aleksić	(Bosnia and Herzegovina) Sloboda Dita	91	22	4.14
3.	(Croatia) Marko Popović	(Croatia) Zadar	61	17	3.59
4.	(Croatia) Mladen Erjavec	(Bosnia and Herzegovina) FEAL Široki	67	22	3.05
3.	(Croatia) Davor Marcelić	(Croatia) Zadar	48	16	3.00

Source: Adriatic League
