= Hurl Beechum =

German basketball player (born 1973)

Personal information
- Born: 2 May 1973 (age 53) Des Moines, Iowa
- Listed height: 6 ft 6 in (1.98 m)
- Listed weight: 216 lb (98 kg)

Career information
- College: Iowa State (1991–1995)
- Playing career: 1997–2009
- Position: Small forward / shooting guard
- Number: 7

Career history
- 1998–2002: Bonn
- 2002–2003: Cáceres
- 2003–2004: Fuenlabrada
- 2004–2005: Bamberg
- 2006: Tigers Tübingen
- 2006: Valladolid
- 2007: Apollon Patras
- 2008: Geofin Novy Jicin
- 2008–2009: Prostějov

Hurl Luther III. Beechum (born 2 May 1973) is a retired German-American professional basketball player who starred at Iowa State University from 1991 to 1995. Professionally, Beechum played for more than 12 years in Europe, including for the Telekom Baskets Bonn of the German Basketball League.

His last team as an active player was BK Prostejov in the Czech Republic.

He played for Germany's national basketball team on several occasions.
