= Miljan Pavković =

Serbian basketball coach and former player

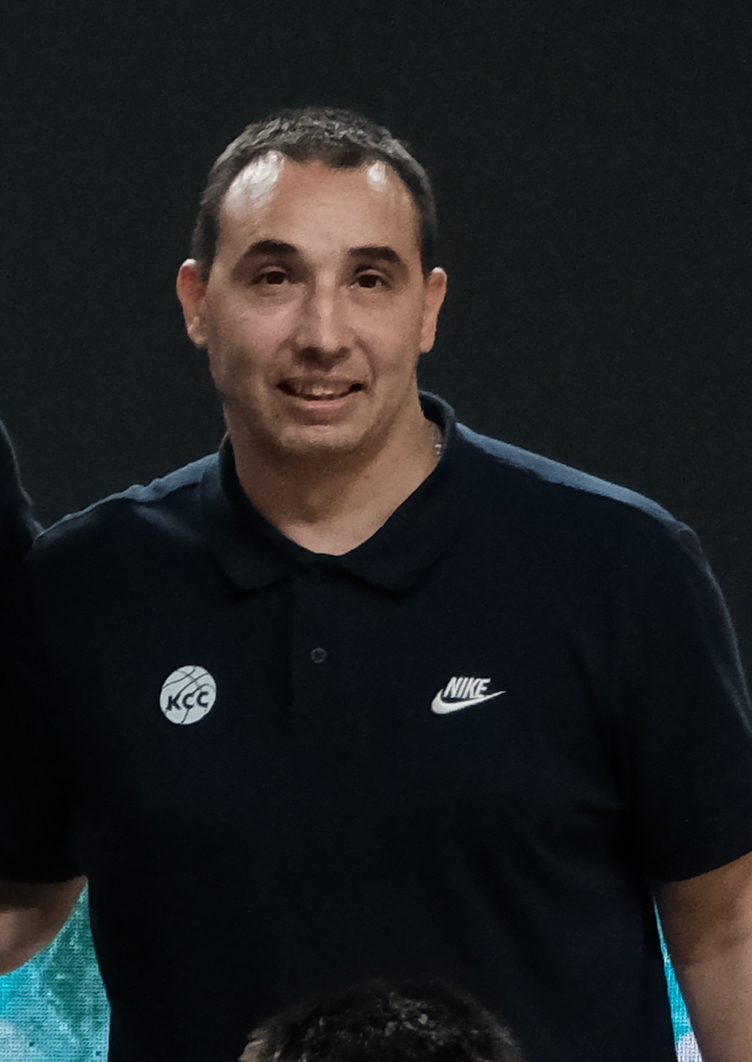
- Pavković in 2026

Vojvodina
- Title: Head coach
- League: Serbian First League; ABA League 2nd Division

Personal information
- Born: April 20, 1981 (age 45) Zaječar, SR Serbia, Yugoslavia
- Listed height: 1.78 m (5 ft 10 in)
- Listed weight: 76 kg (168 lb)

Career information
- NBA draft: 2003: undrafted
- Playing career: 1998–2019
- Position: Point guard
- Number: 4, 44
- Coaching career: 2019–present

Career history

Playing
- 1998–2004: Zdravlje
- 2004–2005: NIS Vojvodina
- 2005–2007: Budućnost
- 2007–2011: Hemofarm
- 2011–2012: Radnički Kragujevac
- 2012–2013: Nymburk
- 2013: Igokea
- 2013–2014: Steaua
- 2014–2015: Rabotnički
- 2015–2016: Lietkabelis
- 2016–2017: Vršac
- 2017–2019: Šenčur

Coaching
- 2019–2020: Šenčur (assistant)
- 2021–2025: Šenčur
- 2025–2026: Metalac Valjevo
- 2026–present: Vojvodina

Career highlights
- As player: Montenegrin League champion (2007); Czech League champion (2013); Montenegrin Cup winner (2007); Czech Cup winner (2013); Macedonian Cup winner (2015); Adriatic League assists leader (2011)

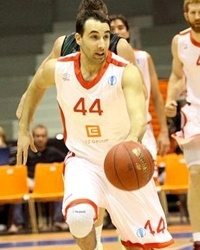

Miljan Pavković (Serbian Cyrillic: Миљан Павковић; born April 20, 1981) is a Serbian professional basketball coach and former player who is the head coach for Vojvodina of the Serbian First League and the ABA League Second Division.

== Professional career ==
Pavković started his professional career with Zdravlje in 1998. He spent six seasons in Leskovac, before transferring to NIS Vojvodina in 2004. Pavković left Novi Sad in 2005, signing for Budućnost Podgorica. After two seasons in Montenegro, he signed for Hemofarm in 2007, spending the next four years in Vršac. In the 2011–12 season, Pavković played with Radnički Kragujevac. In June 2012, Pavković moved abroad, signing with ČEZ Nymburk in the Czech Republic. In July 2013, Pavković signed with KK Igokea. On November 29, 2013, he signed with Steaua București. In September 2014, he signed with Rabotnički.

== Coaching career ==
After retirement as a player with Šenčur in 2019, Pavković joined their coaching staff as an assistant coach. On 21 July 2021, Šenčur hired Pavković as their new head coach. On 24 June 2022, he signed a one-year contract extension with Šenčur.

On August 3, 2026, Pavković with Vojvodina of the Serbian First League.
