= Anton Kazarnovski =

Russian basketball player

Anton Kazarnovski אנטון קזרנובסקי
Jazine Arbanasi
- Position: Center
- League: Prva muška liga

Personal information
- Born: January 21, 1985 (age 41) Moscow, Soviet Union
- Listed height: 2.06 m (6 ft 9 in)

Career information
- NBA draft: 2007: undrafted
- Playing career: 2003–present

Career history
- 2003–2004: Maccabi Tel Aviv
- 2004–2005: Hapoel Galil Elyon
- 2005–2006: Hapoel Holon
- 2006–2007: TV Lich
- 2007: Gießen 46ers
- 2007: HSB Landsberg
- 2007–2008: Bayern Munich
- 2008–2010: Karlsruhe
- 2010: Ironi Ramat Gan
- 2010–2011: Hapoel Gilboa Galil
- 2011: CSU Pitești
- 2011–2012: CSU Asesoft Ploiești
- 2012–2013: Hapoel Galil Elyon
- 2013: Hapoel Eilat B.C.
- 2013–2014: Hapoel Gilboa Galil
- 2014–2015: Hapoel GalilK. Shmona
- 2015–2016: Karpoš Sokoli
- 2016–2017: Karlsruhe
- 2017–2018: Blokotehna
- 2018: Sloboda Užice
- 2018–2019: Apollon Patras
- 2019–2020: Pelister
- 2020–2021: EuroNickel 2005
- 2021–2022: Bashkimi Prizren
- 2022–present: Jazine Arbanasi

Career highlights
- Euroleague champion (2004); Israeli League champion (2004); Israeli State Cup champion (2004)

Anton Kazarnovski (Hebrew: אנטון קזרנובסקי, Russian: Антон Казарновский; born January 21, 1985) is an Israeli-Russian professional basketball player for Jazine Arbanasi of the second-tier Prva muška liga.

He is 6 ft 9 in (206 cm) tall, and weighs 220 pounds (100 kg). He played for the Israeli U-16, U-18, U-20, U-21, and University National Teams.

He grew up playing with the Maccabi Tel Aviv junior team. In 2003–04, he played one game for Maccabi Tel Aviv.

In 2019–20, playing for KK Pelister Sport Bitola of the Ma Superleague, he averaged 17 points per game. Kazarnovski began the 2021–22 season with Bashkimi Prizren, averaging 13.4 points, 7.3 rebounds, and 2.1 assists per game. On March 1, 2022, he signed with KK Angeli.
