= Eurocup 2014–15 Regular Season Group I =

Results of a basketball tournament

Standings and Results for Group I of the Last 32 phase of the 2014–15 Eurocup basketball tournament.

== Standings ==
Pos	Team	Pld	W	L	PF	PA	PD	ROM	CED	OKT	CAI
1	(Italy) Acea Roma	6	4	2	473	442	+31		73–66	82–66	87–66
2	(Croatia) Cedevita	6	4	2	500	493	+7	91–90		92–101	83–80
3	(Russia) Krasny Oktyabr	6	3	3	471	482	−11	86–88	65–83		71–66
4	(Spain) CAI Zaragoza	6	1	5	434	461	−27	67–53	84–85	71–82	

Source: Euroleague Basketball;
