= Nolan Smith =

American basketball player and coach (born 1988)

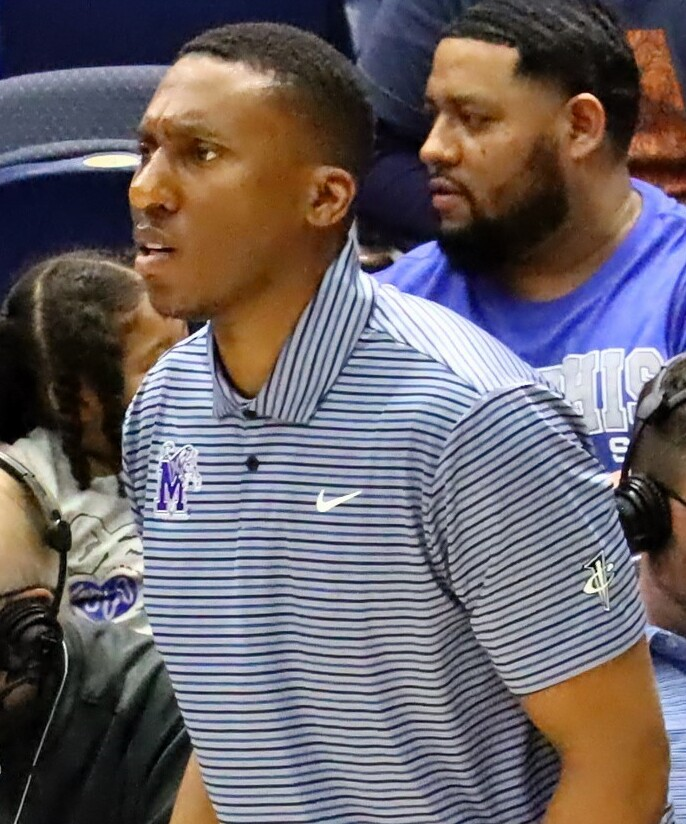
- Smith in 2025

Tennessee State Tigers
- Title: Head coach
- League: Ohio Valley Conference

Personal information
- Born: July 25, 1988 (age 38) Louisville, Kentucky, U.S.
- Listed height: 6 ft 2 in (1.88 m)
- Listed weight: 185 lb (84 kg)

Career information
- High school: St. John's College HS (Washington, D.C.); Riverdale Baptist School (Upper Marlboro, Maryland); Oak Hill Academy (Mouth of Wilson, Virginia)
- College: Duke (2007–2011)
- NBA draft: 2011: 1st round, 21st overall pick
- Drafted by: Portland Trail Blazers
- Playing career: 2011–2015
- Position: Point guard
- Number: 4
- Coaching career: 2016–present

Career history

Playing
- 2011–2013: Portland Trail Blazers
- 2013: →Idaho Stampede
- 2013–2014: Cedevita Zagreb
- 2014: Galatasaray
- 2014–2015: Delaware 87ers

Coaching
- 2016–2022: Duke (assistant)
- 2022–2024: Louisville (assistant)
- 2024–2025: Memphis (assistant)
- 2025–present: Tennessee State

Career highlights
- As player: Croatian League champion (2014); Croatian Cup champion (2014); Croatian League All-Star (2014); NCAA champion (2010); Consensus first-team All-American (2011); ACC Player of the Year (2011); First-team All-ACC (2011); Second-team All-ACC (2010); ACC All-Defensive Team (2011); McDonald's All-American (2007); First-team Parade All-American (2007); As coach: OVC tournament champion (2026); OVC regular season champion (2026); OVC co-Coach of the Year (2026)
- Stats at NBA.com
- Stats at Basketball Reference

Nolan Derek Smith (born July 25, 1988) is an American former professional basketball player and current head coach for Tennessee State. He played college basketball for the Duke Blue Devils before being drafted 21st overall by the Portland Trail Blazers in the 2011 NBA draft. As a junior, he started at shooting guard for Duke's national champion 2010 team. As a senior, he was named a consensus first-team All-American and the ACC Player of the Year.

== Early life ==
As a child, Smith frequently attended Washington Bullets practices after his father, then-former NBA player, Derek Smith, took their assistant coach position in 1994. Following the death of his father in 1996, the Bullets made Smith a frequent guest at their home games.

== High school career ==
As an eighth grader, Smith played varsity basketball for The Key School in Annapolis, Maryland before moving to St. John's College High School in Washington, D.C. for his freshman season in 2003–04. At St. John's, he was a third-team all-conference pick while averaging 10.6 points, 5.4 rebounds, 6.3 assists and 2.1 steals per game.

As a sophomore in 2004–05, Smith attended Riverdale Baptist School in Upper Marlboro, Maryland. There, he averaged 16 points, six rebounds, eight assists and three steals per game as he led Riverdale to a 33–1 record and subsequently earned third-team All-Metro honors.

For his junior and senior years, Smith attended Oak Hill Academy in Mouth of Wilson, Virginia where he was a two-year captain and played alongside several future NBA players, including Michael Beasley, Ty Lawson and Brandon Jennings. In 2005–06, he averaged 17 points, five rebounds, five assists and two steals per game as he helped Oak Hill to a 40–1 overall record and a final USA Today No. 2 national ranking. He subsequently earned EA Sports second-team All-America honors.

On November 13, 2006, Smith signed a National Letter of Intent to play college basketball for Duke University.

As a senior in 2006–07, Smith averaged 22.1 points, 4.6 rebounds, 4.1 assists and 3.2 steals per game as he led his team to a 40–1 record, tying the school's single season wins record and helping Oak Hill earn the top spot in the final USA Today 2007 Super 25 national rankings. He earned first-team EA Sports and Parade All-American honors and was named to the Les Schwab Invitational all-tournament team after leading Oak Hill to the championship. He also earned McDonald's All-American honors.

Considered a four-star recruit by Rivals.com, Smith was listed as the No. 8 shooting guard and the No. 39 player in the nation in 2007.

== College career ==
=== Freshman year ===
As a freshman at Duke in 2007–08, Smith played in all 34 games, with one starting assignment as he averaged 5.9 points, 1.5 rebounds and 1.3 assists in 14.7 minutes per game. He earned his first collegiate start against Cornell on January 6, 2008, and scored nine points on 4-of-6 shooting, while overall, he scored in double figures six times, including a season-high 21 points against Wake Forest on February 17.

=== Sophomore year ===
As a sophomore in 2008–09, Smith played in 34 games, with 21 starting assignments as he averaged 8.4 points, 2.2 rebounds and 1.7 assists per game. He finished the season ranked fourth on the team in double-figure scoring games with 17. He scored a season-high 16 points, along with five rebounds and four assists, against Michigan on November 21, 2008.

=== Junior year ===
As a junior in 2009–10, Smith started 38 games after sitting out the first two games of the season, serving a suspension for playing in a non-sanctioned summer league game. He averaged 17.4 points, 2.8 rebounds, 3.0 assists and 1.2 steals per game. He led the Blue Devils in field goals made; finished second in assists, steals and three-point field goal percentage; and third on the team in scoring, three-point field goals, free throws made, free throw percentage and minutes. He subsequently earned second-team All-ACC honors, and claimed USBWA All-District III and NABC Second Team All-District 2 honors.

March 28, 2010, Smith scored a then career-high 29 points on 9-of-17 from the field in an Elite Eight game, as Duke defeated Baylor and advanced to the Final Four. In that game, Smith (628 points), Jon Scheyer (690 points) and Kyle Singler (667 points) became the second trio in Duke history to each score at least 600 points in a season; in 2001–02, Jay Williams, Carlos Boozer and Mike Dunleavy Jr. first accomplished that feat for Duke.

Smith went on to earn NCAA All-Final Four team as he led Duke to an NCAA championship victory. He averaged 16 points and five assists per game in wins over West Virginia and Butler.

=== Senior year ===
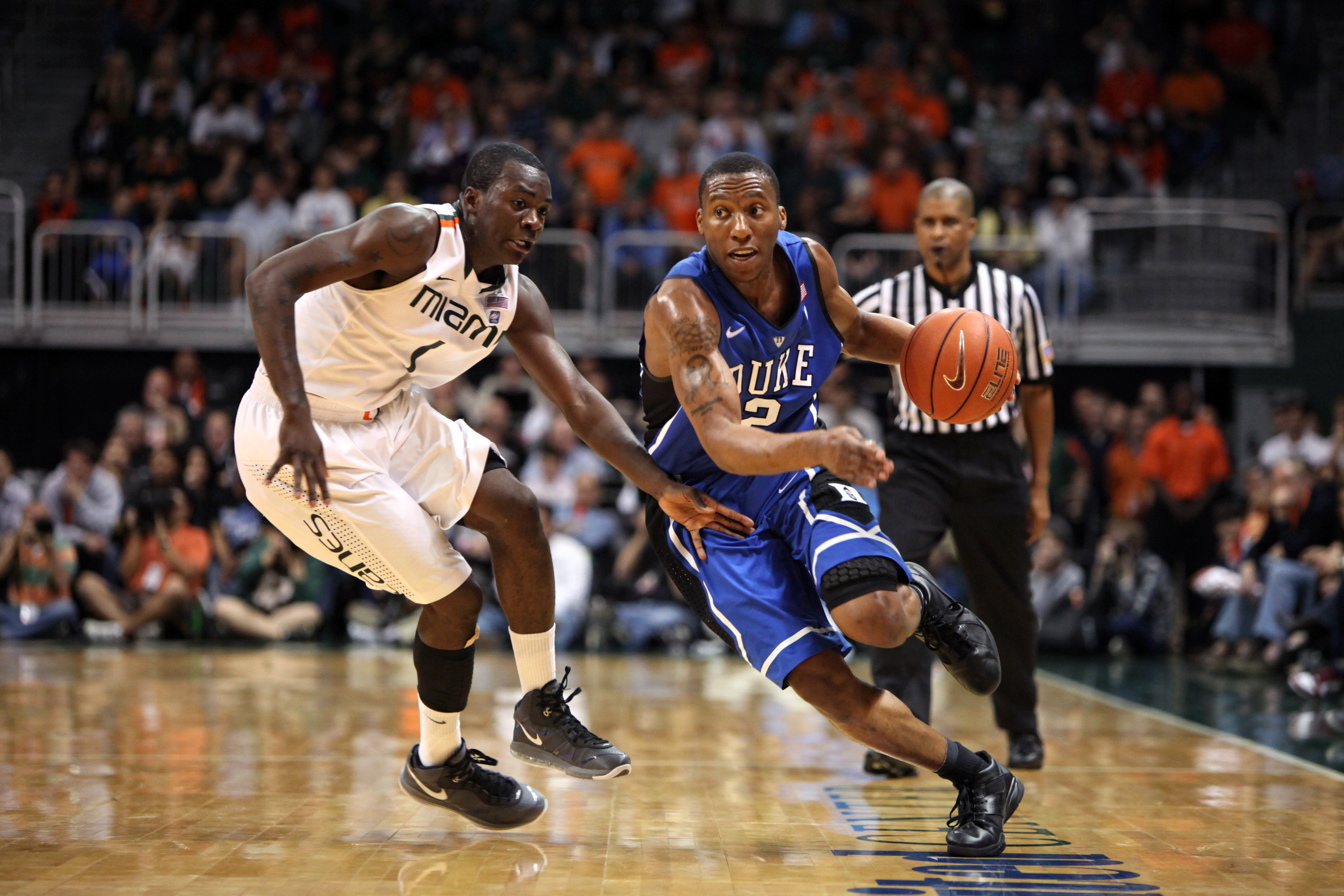
Nolan (2) was named ACC Player of the Year in 2011.

As a senior in 2010–11, Smith started 37 games as he averaged 20.6 points, 4.5 rebounds, 5.1 assists and 1.2 steals per game. He was named the 12th ACC Player of the Year in school history after becoming the 11th Duke player to lead the league in scoring. He earned first-team All-ACC and ACC All-Defensive team honors, and NABC and USBWA first-team All-District honors after leading Duke to a 32–5 record and a third consecutive ACC championship. He was also a finalist for the Naismith Trophy, Wooden Award, Oscar Robertson Trophy and Bob Cousy Award.

On February 9, 2011, Smith scored a career high 34 points in a home win over No. 20 North Carolina, making a career-high 13 field goal attempts.

Smith was the team captain in 2010–11, along with fellow senior Kyle Singler. He was well respected amongst his peers as teammates gravitated towards him in the locker room because of his passion for the game, and his ability to remain energetic and loose in high-pressure situations. He became just the ninth player under Mike Krzyzewski to average over 20.0 points per game, and with his 764 total points in 2010–11, he recorded the ninth highest single season total and is just the 19th time a Duke player has scored 700 or more.

== Professional career ==
=== Portland Trail Blazers (2011–2013) ===
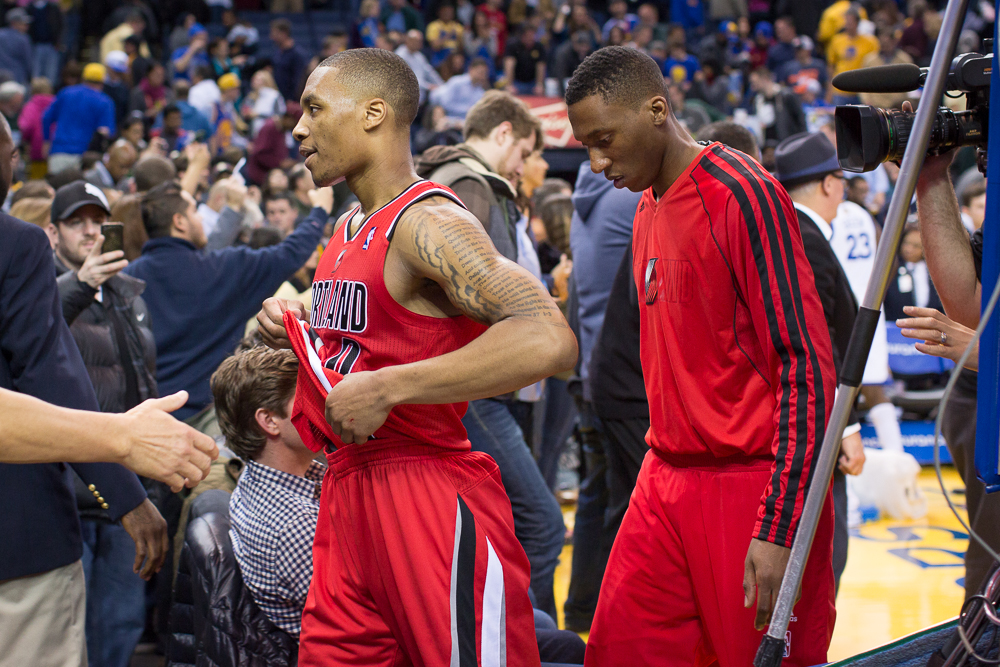
Smith (right) with teammate Damian Lillard in 2013

Smith was selected with the 21st overall pick in the 2011 NBA draft by the Portland Trail Blazers. On December 9, 2011, he signed his rookie scale contract with the Trail Blazers. As a rookie, he played 44 games (four starts) and averaged 3.8 points, 1.4 assists and 1.3 rebounds in 12.3 minutes per game.

In July 2012, Smith joined the Trail Blazers for the 2012 NBA Summer League, but managed just two games after he was ruled out for the rest of the competition on July 17 when he received an elbow to the head from Rockets' swingman Zoran Dragić while driving to the hoop. He was carried out on a stretcher and the game was called off with 27 seconds left to play. Later that day, after tests came back normal, he was released from Las Vegas hospital.

On January 6, 2013, Smith was assigned to the Idaho Stampede of the NBA Development League. On January 9, he was recalled by the Trail Blazers after competing in both of Idaho's games at the 2013 NBA D-League Showcase in Reno. He averaged 22.5 points, 5.5 rebounds, 5.5 assists and 1.0 steals in 38.0 minutes per game as he was named Showcase honorable mention honors. He finished his sophomore season with averages of 2.8 points, 0.7 rebounds and 0.9 assists in 40 games.

=== Cedevita (2013–2014) ===
In July 2013, Smith joined the Boston Celtics for the 2013 NBA Summer League where he played just one game and scored four points.

On August 18, 2013, Smith signed a one-year deal with Cedevita Zagreb of the Croatian League. He gained a lot of media attention in the country after hitting a buzzer beater three-pointer with 0.6 seconds left in the semi-final of the ABA League Final Four, securing his team a spot in the 2014–15 Euroleague, and leaving a Serbian legendary club Partizan out of the Euroleague for the first time after 14 years, and the first time since ULEB takeover of the competition in 2000.

=== Galatasaray (2014) ===
In July 2014, Smith joined the Oklahoma City Thunder for the 2014 NBA Summer League where he averaged 4.6 points, 1.4 rebounds and 2.0 assists in five games.

On August 29, 2014, Smith signed a one-year deal with Galatasaray Liv Hospital of the Turkish Basketball League. On October 19, 2014, in a Turkish League game against Banvit, he threw a towel while being subbed out, after which head coach Ergin Ataman expelled him from the arena. He later apologized for this incident. He later parted ways with Galatasaray on October 27, 2014.

=== Delaware 87ers (2014–2015) ===
On November 26, 2014, Smith was acquired by the Delaware 87ers of the NBA Development League. On January 15, 2015, he was waived by the 87ers.

== Coaching career ==
Following his playing career, Smith joined the Duke Blue Devils coaching staff under head coach Mike Krzyzewski. After being hired in February 2016, Smith spent two years as a special assistant and three years as director of basketball operations & player development. In 2021, he was named a Duke assistant coach.

In six years on the Duke coaching staff, the team won 159 of 206 games. In 2022, the team made the Final Four. During those six years, Smith helped coach a total of 25 players who went on to the NBA, including the following first-round draft picks: Jayson Tatum, Luke Kennard, Harry Giles, Marvin Bagley III, Wendell Carter Jr, Grayson Allen, Zion Williamson, R.J. Barrett, Cam Reddish, Jalen Johnson, Paolo Banchero, Mark Williams, AJ Griffin, and Wendell Moore.

Following the 2021–22 season, Smith left Duke to become an assistant coach for the Louisville Cardinals under their new head coach Kenny Payne. Payne had known Smith's father, Derek Smith, who had starred for the Louisville's 1980 championship team before a nine-year career in the NBA.

Louisville won only 12 of 64 games during the ensuing two years, and the entire staff was fired after the 2023–24 season.

In September 2024, Smith was hired as an assistant coach at Memphis.

In July 2025, Smith was hired as the head coach at Tennessee State, replacing Penny Collins, who departed for a position in the NBA.

== Career statistics ==
Legend
| GP | Games played | GS | Games started | MPG | Minutes per game |
| FG% | Field goal percentage | 3P% | 3-point field goal percentage | FT% | Free throw percentage |
| RPG | Rebounds per game | APG | Assists per game | SPG | Steals per game |
| BPG | Blocks per game | PPG | Points per game | **Bold** | Career high |

=== NBA ===
==== Regular season ====
| Year | Team | GP | GS | MPG | FG% | 3P% | FT% | RPG | APG | SPG | BPG | PPG |
|---|---|---|---|---|---|---|---|---|---|---|---|---|
| 2011–12 | Portland | **44** | **4** | **12.3** | **.372** | **.289** | **.714** | **1.3** | **1.4** | **.4** | **.1** | **3.8** |
| 2012–13 | Portland | 40 | 0 | 7.2 | .368 | .214 | **.714** | .7 | .9 | .2 | .0 | 2.8 |
| Career | | 84 | 4 | 9.9 | .371 | .260 | .714 | 1.0 | 1.2 | .3 | .0 | 3.3 |

=== Euroleague ===
| Year | Team | GP | GS | MPG | FG% | 3P% | FT% | RPG | APG | SPG | BPG | PPG | PIR |
|---|---|---|---|---|---|---|---|---|---|---|---|---|---|
| 2014–15 | Galatasaray | 1 | 0 | 16.4 | .222 | .000 | 1.000 | 3.0 | 1.0 | .0 | .0 | 6.0 | -1.0 |
| Career | | 1 | 0 | 16.4 | .222 | .000 | 1.000 | 3.0 | 1.0 | .0 | .0 | 6.0 | -1.0 |

=== College ===
| Year | Team | GP | GS | MPG | FG% | 3P% | FT% | RPG | APG | SPG | BPG | PPG |
|---|---|---|---|---|---|---|---|---|---|---|---|---|
| 2007–08 | Duke | 34 | 1 | 14.7 | **.467** | .386 | .769 | 1.5 | 1.3 | .5 | .1 | 5.9 |
| 2008–09 | Duke | 34 | 21 | 21.6 | .426 | .346 | **.849** | 2.2 | 1.7 | .9 | .1 | 8.4 |
| 2009–10 | Duke | **38** | **38** | **35.5** | .441 | **.392** | .767 | 2.8 | 3.0 | **1.2** | **.2** | 17.4 |
| 2010–11 | Duke | 37 | 37 | 34.0 | .458 | .350 | .813 | **4.5** | **5.1** | **1.2** | .1 | **20.6** |
| Career | | 143 | 98 | 26.9 | .448 | .368 | .800 | 2.8 | 2.8 | 1.0 | .1 | 13.4 |

== Head coaching record ==
Record table
| Season | Team | Overall | Conference | Standing | Postseason |
|---|---|---|---|---|---|
Tennessee State Tigers (Ohio Valley Conference) (2025–present)
| 2025–26 | Tennessee State | 23–10 | 15–5 | T–1st | NCAA Division I Round of 64 |
| Tennessee State: | | 23–10 (.697) | 15–5 (.750) | | |
| Total: | | 23–10 (.697) | | | |
National champion Postseason invitational champion Conference regular season champion Conference regular season and conference tournament champion Division regular season champion Division regular season and conference tournament champion Conference tournament champion

== Personal life ==
Smith is the son of Monica Smith and the late Derek Smith. He has one older sister, Sydney Smith. His father played basketball at Louisville and was a member of the 1980 NCAA championship team that defeated UCLA. His father then played nine years in the NBA. At age 34, Derek died of a heart attack while he and his family were on a cruise ship near Bermuda.

Smith has a tattoo on his right arm, with his father's likeness and the words: "Forever Watching." He grew up with Michael Beasley and remains friends with him. In 2021, Nolan began co-hosting the "Power Check Ball" podcast alongside Marc Isenberg. Smith is married to UNC alumna Cheyna Elliott. They were married in 2017 and have three children, Camryn, Derek "Deuce,” and Kai

In a November 4, 2020 tweet, nonpartisan voter advocate organization VoteRiders shared a video of Smith urging voters who need help to resolve issues with absentee ballots to contact VoterRiders' helpline for assistance.

== See also ==
- 2009–10 Duke Blue Devils men's basketball team
- List of second-generation NBA players
