= Goran Suton =

Croatian basketball player

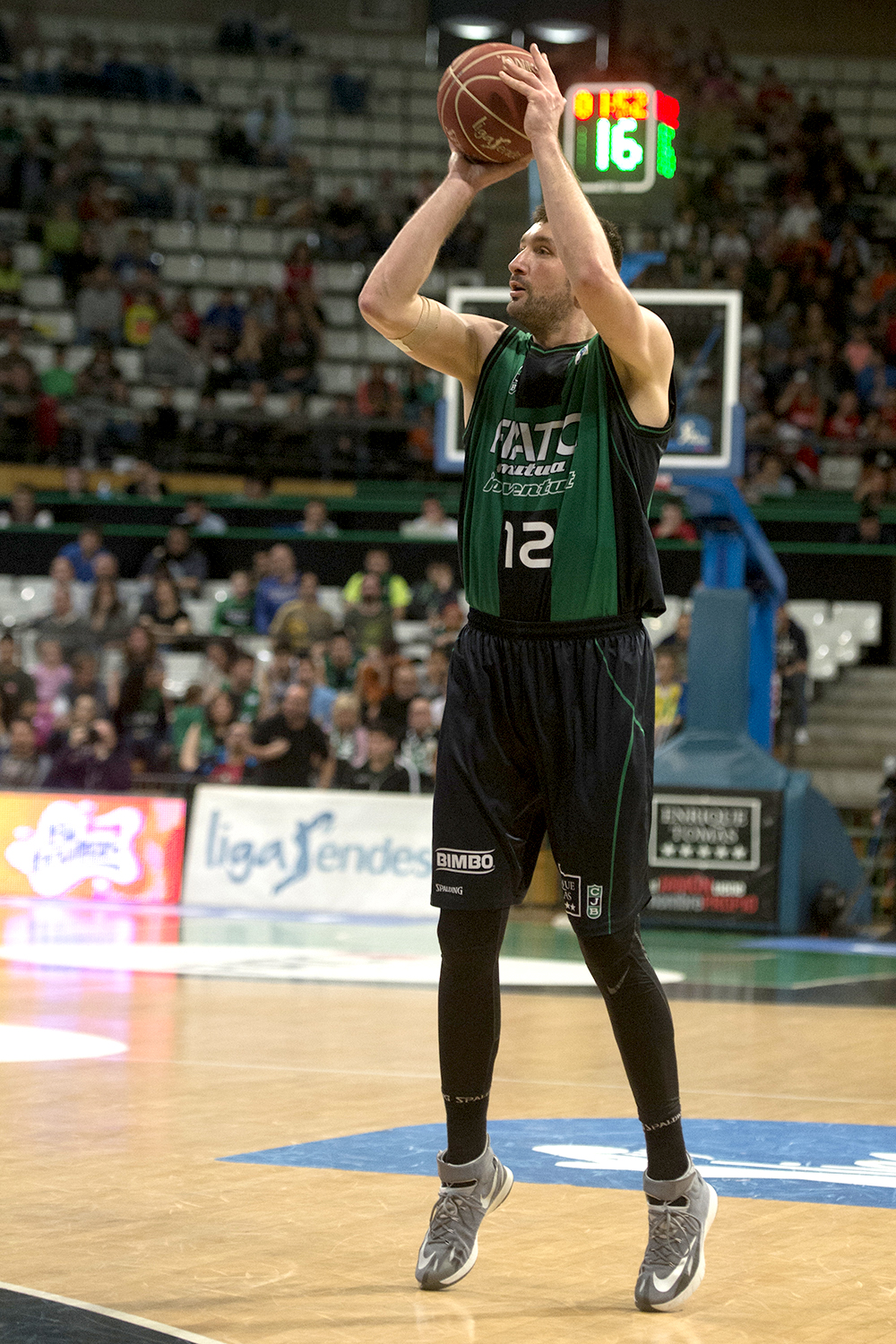
- Suton with Cedevita in 2012

Personal information
- Born: 11 August 1985 (age 41) Sarajevo, SR Bosnia and Herzegovina, SFR Yugoslavia
- Listed height: 2.08 m (6 ft 10 in)
- Listed weight: 111 kg (245 lb)

Career information
- High school: Everett (Lansing, Michigan)
- College: Michigan State (2005–2009)
- NBA draft: 2009: 2nd round, 50th overall pick
- Drafted by: Utah Jazz
- Playing career: 2009–2019
- Position: Center

Career history
- 2009–2010: Spartak St. Petersburg
- 2010–2011: Angelico Biella
- 2011–2012: Cibona
- 2012–2014: Cedevita
- 2014–2016: Joventut Badalona
- 2016–2019: Estudiantes

Career highlights
- 2× Croatian League champion (2012, 2014); Second-team All-Big Ten (2009)
- Stats at Basketball Reference

Goran Suton (born 11 August 1985) is a Bosnian-Croat former professional basketball player who last played for Movistar Estudiantes of the Liga ACB. He played college basketball with the Michigan State Spartans.

== Early years ==
Suton was born on the outskirts of Sarajevo in then-Socialist Republic of Bosnia and Herzegovina, SFR Yugoslavia, to father Miroslav and mother Živana, a Bosnian Croat and Bosnian Serb respectively. During the Bosnian War, he lived with his family in Gornji Milanovac, Serbia. He played for the Bosnian U14 side before his family moved to the US, where he attended Everett High School in Lansing, Michigan. There he led the Everett Vikings to a Class A boys basketball title in 2004 as a senior.

== College career ==
Suton first rose to notability during his freshman season at Michigan State, when he notoriously missed a last-second layup in a hotly contested game against Gonzaga in the Maui Invitational. Suton developed into a key player for the Spartans during his career, earning second team All-Big Ten marks during his senior season.

Suton helped the Spartans to an NCAA Final Four as a senior in 2009. He was especially effective during the 2009 Final Four run, holding USC star Taj Gibson to three points, and hitting a string of jump shots against Louisville on his way to scoring 19 points in the game. Suton was named Most Outstanding Player of the Midwest regional in 2009. Suton was named to the first team all-tournament.

== Professional career ==
Suton was chosen 50th overall by the Utah Jazz in the 2009 NBA draft. Jazz coach Jerry Sloan cut Suton during the preseason on 21 October 2009. Suton signed a contract with Spartak St. Petersburg of the Russian Basketball Super League on 2 November 2009. For the 2010–2011 season he played with Angelico Biella of Italy. In July 2011 he signed with Cibona Zagreb and won Croatian championship with them. In August 2012 Suton joined Cibona's city rivals KK Cedevita. In August 2014, he moved to Spain and signed with Joventut Badalona. On 5 August 2015, Suton signed a new deal with Joventut Badalona for one more season after averaged 10.5 points and 6.5 rebounds in his first season in Liga ACB. On 2 August 2016, he signed with Estudiantes.

== Personal ==
Suton became a naturalized citizen of the United States in 2006.
