= Pierre Pierce =

American professional basketball player (born 1983)

Personal information
- Born: June 7, 1983 (age 42) Westmont, Illinois, U.S.
- Listed height: 6 ft 4 in (1.93 m)
- Listed weight: 195 lb (88 kg)

Career information
- High school: Westmont (Westmont, Illinois)
- College: Iowa (2001–2005)
- NBA draft: 2005: undrafted
- Playing career: 2005–present
- Position: Shooting guard

Career history
- 2008–2010: Hyères-Toulon
- 2010–2011: Aris
- 2011–2012: Azovmash
- 2012–2013: Hyères-Toulon
- 2013: Cholet Basket
- 2013–2014: Hyères-Toulon

Career highlights
- Third-team Parade All-American (2001)

Pierre Antoine Pierce (born June 7, 1983) is an American former professional basketball player and sex offender. A former member of the University of Iowa Hawkeyes men's team, Pierce was convicted of several crimes relating to a violent incident with a former girlfriend, leading to his dismissal from the Hawkeyes and eventual imprisonment. The 6-foot-4-inch (1.93 m) and 195 lb (88 kg) point guard shooting guard was the highest scoring player on the team at the time of his dismissal.

Pierce was born in the Chicago, Illinois suburb of Westmont, and he played competitive basketball for Westmont High School. He began attending the University of Iowa in 2001.

== College career ==
In his freshman season (2001–02), in which he started 32 of 35 games, mostly at point guard, Pierce averaged 7.1 points (4th on the team), 3.3 rebounds (4th on the team) and a team-leading 3.3 assists per game, while making 16.7% of his three-pointers.

As he was suspended for the entire 2002–03 season, Pierce's sophomore season commenced in 2003–04. In 29 games, he averaged a team-leading 16.1 points, 5.7 rebounds (3rd on the team) and 3.7 assists (2nd on the team). A highlight was a 28-point performance in a 79–70 loss to Michigan on March 12, 2004.

In his final season (2004–05), up until it had been cut short, the junior had been leading the team with 17.8 points, while averaging 5.2 rebounds (2nd on the team), 4.2 assists, and for a team-high 2.5 steals, this was a marked improvement from 2001 to 2002 and 2003–04, when he averaged only 0.9 steals in each of those seasons. He had a career-high 31 points and a team-high 3 steals in an 81–69 loss to Ohio State on January 8, 2005.

== Legal troubles ==
=== 2001 and 2002 charges ===
According to DuPage County (Illinois) court records, in June 2001, Pierce was arrested and had to post bail on charges of criminal defacement and mob action for allegedly spray-painting his high school, although Pierce disputes the records.

In September 2002, Pierce was charged with one count of third-degree sexual assault in Iowa City. He was arrested on October 1. On September 7, a report was filed by a woman who was treated at a hospital emergency room the day before. She accused Pierce, an acquaintance, of performing unwanted sex acts on her at a party at his Iowa City apartment on September 6. According to records, Pierce held the woman's hands over her head and covered her mouth when she tried to scream. He was subsequently suspended indefinitely from the Iowa Hawkeyes by athletic department officials, which was atypical, as the school usually waits for the legal process to play out before making a decision, but the school took swift action because of the severity of the charge.

To avoid imprisonment, Pierce pleaded guilty to a lesser misdemeanor charge of assault causing injury in a sexual assault. He received no jail time, but received a deferred judgment, so the charge was erased from his record after he successfully completed a year of probation, counseling and 200 hours of community service, the requirements of the plea agreement. He later apologized publicly for engaging in "inappropriate sexual conduct with a fellow student." Pierce sat out the 2002–03 season after his plea bargain but took it as a redshirt year to avoid losing it as a year of eligibility.

Because there were many people upset over Pierce being allowed to remain on the team and keep his scholarship, two petitions totaling over 3,000 signatures were filed protesting the circumstances of the school's handling of the case. A petition started by a law school student had 1,873 signatures, while the university's Women's Resource and Action Center collected 1,230. Amid resolutions urging students to boycott the men's basketball games, the petition had urged season ticket holders to ask the athletic department for a refund or to transfer their tickets to another athletic team, actions Pierce's attorney Alfredo Parrish labeled "absolutely ridiculous" because "[they] don't know the facts" before "[reaching] a conclusion."

Pierce spent that season working on improving his game while he was not competing. Pierce was back in uniform with the team in August 2003, in a return for the 2003–04 season, in which he led the Hawkeyes on a five-game tour of Australia. In those games, he averaged 20.8 points a game on better than 50-percent shooting, and almost 5 rebounds per game.

=== 2005 charges and imprisonment ===
On January 27, 2005, a disturbance was investigated at the West Des Moines home of a woman Pierce had been dating for 2½ years. He allegedly choked her, threatened her with a knife and stripped her after an argument over her new boyfriend. Pierce was also accused of causing damage to her apartment and stealing a laptop and camera. After police confirmed Pierce was the focus of their investigation, he was dismissed from the basketball team by coach Steve Alford on February 2, with Alford saying that [Pierce had] betrayed the trust they placed in him when he was given a second chance two years prior. At the time, Pierce was the leading scorer on the team averaging 17.8 points per game, the third-best in the Big Ten Conference, and led the Hawkeyes with 16.1 points a game as a sophomore in 2003–04. Pierce met with Alford for about 15 minutes on February 15, and Pierce's appeal to have his dismissal reconsidered was rejected by Alford. Pierce remained on scholarship and was still attending classes.

Pierce's attorney Alfredo Parrish sought dismissal of the most serious of the charges, first-degree burglary, a felony that carries a maximum penalty of up to 25 years upon conviction. On February 28, 2005, Pierce pleaded not guilty to two charges of first-degree burglary, assault with intent to commit sexual assault and fourth-degree criminal mischief. Because the first-degree burglary charges and the assault charges are felonies, a conviction would mean Pierce could have been sentenced to up to 56 years and fined $9,000. In March, he waived his right to a speedy trial, delaying it from mid-May to a later date. Months later, fresh evidence surfaced that Pierce made more than 200 phone calls to his ex-girlfriend in March and April, which violated a no-contact order.

In May 2005, a judge allowed Pierce to travel outside of Iowa to attend a Chicago, Illinois-based camp in preparation for June's 2005 NBA draft. Strict conditions were placed on Pierce, including the posting of a $30,000 cash bond, that he stay with his parents in the Chicago area and that he submit a plan outlining his supervision while attending the camp.

In August 2005, he reached a plea bargain and pleaded guilty to third-degree burglary, assault with an intent to commit sexual abuse, false imprisonment, and fourth-degree criminal mischief in Dallas County District Court. He was originally charged with two counts of first-degree burglary, but prosecutors agreed to dismiss these, which would have carried a 25-year sentence. He was sentenced on October 28, 2005, to a five-year suspended sentence on the burglary charge, two years on the assault charge and one year each for false imprisonment and criminal mischief, the sentences to be served concurrently.

Pierce served 332 days (11 months) of a 2-year sentence at Iowa's Mount Pleasant Correctional Facility before being released on probation on September 24, 2006. Pierce originally sought early release but learned he was denied on August 7, 2006, thus delaying his freedom for several weeks. He received time off for good behavior and participation in prison treatment programs including a 4- to 5-month treatment program for sex offenders. He was to remain on probation for the next four years and one month, and had to register with the Iowa Sex Offender Registry before his release.

=== Release ===
Pierce was named to the roster of Golden State Warriors' 2007 NBA Summer League competition in Las Vegas, in which he played impressively, averaging 21.5 points in his first two games. Because the terms of his probation prevented him from leaving Iowa to pursue a career with the NBA, his participation in the Nevada-based summer league was a violation, which resulted in him being sentenced in April 2008 to 30 days' jail.

In September 2008, the Iowa Supreme Court allowed Pierce to leave Iowa to play professionally in France where he signed a $120,000 contract with a team (Hyères-Toulon Var Basket) in their top professional league in which he averaged 13.6 points, 4.4 rebounds and 5.1 assists in 30 French League games. In July 2010 he signed a one-year deal with Greek club Aris BC. In February 2011 he signed with BC Azovmash. He last played for l'Angers Basket Club in France in 2014–15 season.
