= Ilian Evtimov =

Bulgarian-French basketball player

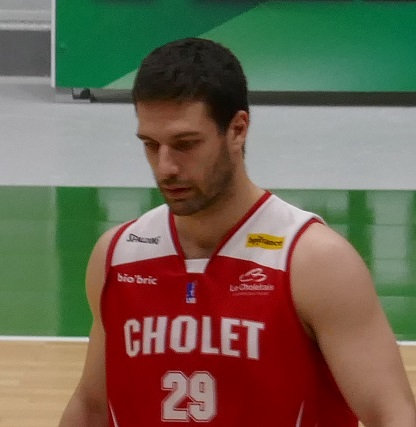

No. 3 – Cholet Basket
- Position: Power forward
- League: LNB Pro A

Personal information
- Born: April 28, 1983 (age 43) Sofia, Bulgaria
- Listed height: 6 ft 7 in (2.01 m)
- Listed weight: 215 lb (98 kg)

Career information
- High school: Bishop McGuinness (Kernersville, North Carolina)
- College: NC State (2001–2006)
- NBA draft: 2006: undrafted
- Playing career: 2006–present

Career history
- 2006: Estudiantes
- 2006–2007: Virtus Bologna
- 2007–2009: Skyliners Frankfurt
- 2009: Levski Sofia
- 2009–2010: AEL Limassol
- 2010–2016: Élan Chalon
- 2016–present: Cholet

Career highlights
- Pro A champion (2012); 2× French Cup winner (2011–2012); French Cup Final MVP (2012); Semaine des As champion (2012)
Medals
Men's basketball
Representing France
FIBA Europe Under-20 Championship
Bronze medal – third place	2002 Lithuania	U-20 Team

Ilian Iliev Evtimov (Bulgarian: Илиян Евтимов; born April 28, 1983) is a Bulgarian-French professional basketball player for Cholet of the French Pro A. He is a 6 ft 7 in (2.01 m) power forward.

== College career ==
Evtimov played college basketball in the United States at NCAA Division I school North Carolina State University, where he played with the NC State Wolfpack, from 2001 to 2006.

== Professional career ==
Evtimov signed his first professional contract with Virtus Bologna in 2006 and joined the Deutsche Bank Skyliners for the 2007–08 season. Starting from 2010, Evtimov played for Élan Chalon and with the club he won the Pro A in 2012. He also won the French Basketball Cup in 2011 and 2012, while in the last Cup victory he was named French Basketball Cup Final MVP.

On June 9, 2016, Evtimov signed with Cholet Basket.

== French national team ==
Evtimov played with the French U22 national team at the 2002 FIBA Europe Under-20 Championship, where he won a bronze medal.

== Personal ==
A French national since 1995, Ilian is the youngest son of Bulgarian basketball star Ilia Evtimov (who relocated the family to France in the early 1990s during his playing career) and the brother of professional Euroleague player Vassil Evtimov.
