= Corsley Edwards =

American basketball player (born 1979)

Personal information
- Born: March 5, 1979 (age 47) Baltimore, Maryland, U.S.
- Listed height: 6 ft 9 in (2.06 m)
- Listed weight: 275 lb (125 kg)

Career information
- High school: Lake Clifton (Baltimore, Maryland)
- College: Central Connecticut (1998–2002)
- NBA draft: 2002: 2nd round, 58th overall pick
- Drafted by: Sacramento Kings
- Playing career: 2002–2014
- Position: Power forward / center
- Number: 34

Career history

Playing
- 2002: Adirondack Wildcats
- 2002: Yakima Sun Kings
- 2002–2003: Sioux Falls Skyforce
- 2003: Carife Ferrara
- 2003–2004: Gloria Due Montecatini
- 2004: Sioux Falls Skyforce
- 2004–2005: New Orleans Hornets
- 2005: Sioux Falls Skyforce
- 2005: Fenerbahçe
- 2005: CB Granada
- 2006–2007: Anaheim Arsenal
- 2007: Banvit B.K.
- 2007: CB Granada
- 2007–2008: Beirasar Rosalia
- 2008: CB Granada
- 2008: Gigantes de Carolina
- 2008–2009: Al Ahli Dubai
- 2009: Yunnan Bulls
- 2009: Al-Shabab
- 2009–2010: Shaanxi Dongsheng Kylins
- 2010: Dakota Wizards
- 2010: Al Ittihad Alexandria
- 2010: Caciques de Humacao
- 2010–2011: Cedevita Zagreb
- 2011–2012: Anwil Włocławek
- 2012–2013: Igokea
- 2013–2014: Homenetmen Beirut
- 2014: İstanbul Teknik Üniversitesi

Coaching
- 2014–2015: Denver Nuggets (assistant)
- 2016–2019: Greensboro Swarm (assistant)

Career highlights
- Bosnian League champion (2013); Bosnian Cup winner (2013); CBA champion (2005); CBA Finals MVP (2005); CBA All-Rookie Team (2003); NEC Player of the Year (2002); 2× First-team All-NEC (2001, 2002)
- Stats at NBA.com
- Stats at Basketball Reference

Corsley Edwards (born March 5, 1979) is an American former professional basketball player. He played college basketball for Central Connecticut.

== Early life and college ==
Edwards was born in Baltimore, Maryland, and graduated from Lake Clifton High School in 1998. He played collegiately at Central Connecticut State University and led the team to its first ever NCAA Tournament appearance in 2000, losing a close 88–78 battle as a #15 seed against #2 seeded Iowa State.

== Professional career ==
Edwards was selected by the Sacramento Kings with the final (58th) pick in the 2002 NBA draft but he did not sign with them. In its 2002 draft, the Yakima Sun Kings of the Continental Basketball Association (CBA) selected Edwards as the top (17th overall) pick in the CBA third round. The Sun Kings signed Edwards on November 1, 2002 but waived him on December 2, 2002. He then signed with the Sioux Falls Skyforce of the CBA. In the 2003 CBA All-Star Game, Edwards led the National Conference All-Stars in rebounding with 12 rebounds. He was selected to the CBA All-Rookie Team in 2003.

In the 2003/04 season he played center for RB Montecatini Terme in the Italian LegaDue.

He appeared in 10 games for the New Orleans Hornets during the 2004-05 NBA season averaging 2.7 points per game. The last game of that 10-game run ended up being Edwards' final game in the NBA, being played on January 12, 2005, in a 76–90 loss to the Detroit Pistons where he recorded 2 points, 1 rebound and 1 steal.

He returned to the Sioux Falls Skyforce in 2005 and won the 2005 CBA championship with the team while being named the Finals Most Valuable Player. On April 5, 2005, he joined Fenerbahçe of the Turkish Basketball League. With Fenerbahçe, he averaged 12.5 points and 7.1 rebounds.

In 2006, Edwards was the first player taken in NBA D-League Draft by the Anaheim Arsenal. In 2005–06 he played in Granada, Spain. Edwards returned to Turkey in February 2007 with the team Banvit B.K. In 2008–2009, he played with the Yunnan Honghe Running Bulls in China. In 2009–2010, he played with Shaanxi Kylins. For the 2010–2011 season he signed with the Zagreb club KK Cedevita, where he averaged 12.9 points per game and helped the team enter the Eurocup Basketball 2010–11 Final four. In August 2011 he signed with Anwil Włocławek in Poland. For the 2012–13 season, he signed with KK Igokea. In November 2013, he signed with Homenetmen Beirut.

== Coaching career ==
In October 2014, Edwards was appointed an assistant coach for the Denver Nuggets.

On September 26, 2016, Edwards was appointed an assistant coach of the Greensboro Swarm, a new NBA Development League franchise. He served as an assistant there for three seasons.
