= Dontaye Draper =

American-Croatian basketball player (born 1984)

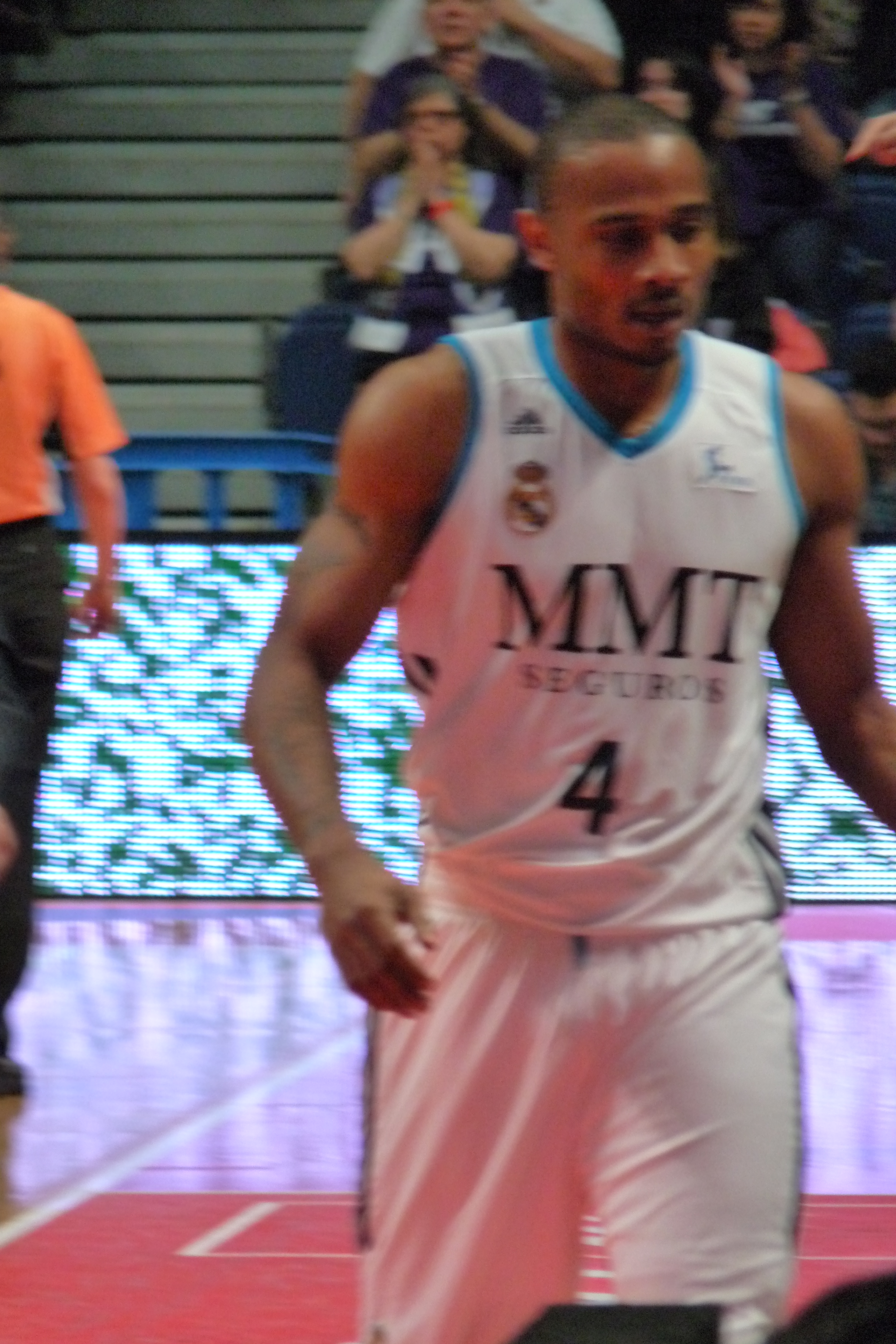
- Draper with Real Madrid in 2013

Personal information
- Born: August 10, 1984 (age 42) Baltimore, Maryland, U.S.
- Listed height: 5 ft 11 in (1.80 m)
- Listed weight: 180 lb (82 kg)

Career information
- High school: Walbrook (Baltimore, Maryland)
- College: College of Charleston (2003–2007)
- NBA draft: 2007: undrafted
- Playing career: 2007–2018
- Position: Point guard
- Number: 4

Career history
- 2007–2008: Sydney Kings
- 2008: Hyeres-Toulon
- 2008–2009: Oostende
- 2009–2010: Prima Veroli
- 2010–2012: Cedevita Zagreb
- 2012–2014: Real Madrid
- 2014–2015: Anadolu Efes
- 2015–2016: Lokomotiv Kuban
- 2016–2017: Real Madrid
- 2017–2018: Real Betis Energía Plus

Career highlights
- Spanish League champion (2013); Croatian Cup winner (2012); 2× Spanish Cup winner (2014, 2017); 2× Spanish Supercup winner (2012, 2013); Turkish Cup winner (2015); All-NBL Third Team (2008); NBL Best Sixth Man (2008); EuroCup MVP (2011); All-EuroCup First Team (2011)

Dontaye Dominic Draper (born August 10, 1984) is an American-Croatian former professional basketball player. Standing at 5 ft 11 in (1.80 m), he played at the point guard position.

== High school ==
Draped played high school basketball at Walbrook High School, in Baltimore, Maryland. He averaged 18 PPG in his first year. In his second year he averaged 34 PPG highschool high for PPG. Later touring his ACL. Made a come back though.

== College career ==
Draper played college basketball at the College of Charleston, with the Charleston Cougars, from 2003 to 2007.

== Professional career ==
Draper began his professional career in 2007–08 with the Sydney Kings of the Australian National Basketball League (NBL). He then joined the French League club Hyeres-Toulon for the start of the 2008–09 season. In December 2008, he joined the Belgian League club BC Oostende.

He then signed with the Italian Second Division club Prima Veroli for the 2009–10 season. He next joined the Adriatic League club Cedevita Zagreb for the 2010–11 season. He was named the EuroCup MVP in 2011. After two seasons with Cedevita Zagreb, he was signed by Real Madrid.

On July 2, 2014, Draper signed a two-year deal with the Turkish team Anadolu Efes. On August 3, 2015, he left Efes, and signed a one-year deal with the Russian club Lokomotiv Kuban.

On July 20, 2016, Draper returned to Real Madrid for the 2016–17 season.

On November 14, 2017, Draper signed with Real Betis Energía Plus for the rest of the 2017–18 ACB season. On February 13, 2018, he parted ways with Sevilla after appearing in eight games.

== Croatian national team ==
While in the process of acquiring his Croatian citizenship, Draper made the list of 25 players who were senior Croatian national team candidates for the EuroBasket 2011. In July 2011, shortly after having received his Croatian citizenship, Draper played his first game for the national team. He also played at the 2013 EuroBasket.

He also represented Croatia at the 2015 EuroBasket, where they were eliminated in the round of final 16 by the Czech Republic.
