= Marino Baždarić =

Croatian basketball player

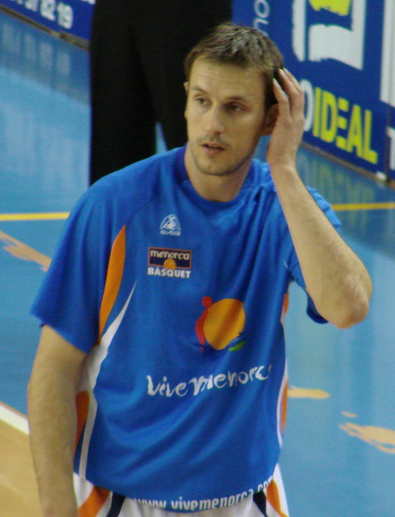
- Baždarić in 2007

Cedevita Junior
- Title: Sports director
- League: Second League

Personal information
- Born: 25 November 1978 (age 47) Rijeka, SR Croatia, SFR Yugoslavia
- Listed height: 6 ft 5.75 in (1.97 m)
- Listed weight: 210 lb (95 kg)

Career information
- Playing career: 1995–2014
- Position: Small forward
- Number: 45

Career history
- 1995–2002: Kvarner
- 2002–2005: Union Olimpija
- 2005–2006: Cibona
- 2006: Union Olimpija
- 2006–2009: ViveMenorca
- 2009–2010: Cibona
- 2010–2014: Cedevita

Career highlights
- 2x Slovenian League champion (2004, 2005); 2x Slovenian Cup winner (2003, 2005); Croatian League champion (2014); 2x Croatian Cup winner (2012, 2014); Adriatic League MVP (2002); Adriatic League Top Scorer (2002); No. 45 retired by Cedevita Zagreb

Marino Baždarić (born 25 November 1978) is a Croatian former professional basketball player, who is currently the sports director for Cedevita Junior.

== Career statistics ==
Season	Team	League	GP	MPG	RPG	APG	PPG
2006–07	Menorca	ACB	34	26	2.4	1.8	11.4
2007–08	Menorca	ACB	27	25	2.6	1.6	10.1
2008–09	Menorca	ACB	25	25	3.2	1.4	10.2
