= Rüştü Nuran =

Turkish basketball referee and surgeon (born 1976)

- Born: March 30, 1976 (age 50); Tuzla, Istanbul, Turkey
- Education: Marmara University
- Occupations: Basketball referee, physician

Rüştü Nuran (born March 30, 1976) is a Turkish basketball referee and surgeon. He officiates FIBA games since June 10, 2005.

Nuran studied medicine at Marmara University graduating in 2001. Currently, he serves as a surgeon for Kinesiology in the Research Center for Sports Medicine and Sportspeople Health at his alma mater.

He officiated FIBA Under-19 World Championship for Women, FIBA Under-19 World Championship, FIBA EuroBasket, Eurocup Basketball, Euroleague Basketball competitions as accompying and head referee. He is nominated as referee for the 2014 FIBA Basketball World Cup matches. He was selected and officiated at the 2013–14 Euroleague Final Four matches.
