= 2020–21 Dinamo Sassari season =

Italian basketball season

Dinamo Sassari
2020-21 season
- Owner: Polisportiva Dinamo s.r.l.
- President: Stefano Sardara
- Head coach: Gianmarco Pozzecco
- Arena: Palasport Roberta Serradimigni
- LBA: 5th of 15
- Playoffs: Quarterfinals
- BCL: Play-offs (4th of 4)
- Italian Cup: Quarter finals
- Supercup: Semifinals

The 2020–21 season is Dinamo Sassari's 61st in existence and the club's 11th consecutive season in the top tier Italian basketball.

== Kit ==
Supplier: EYE Sport Wear / Sponsor: Banco di Sardegna

=== Lega Basket Serie A ===
Home	Away

=== Basketball Champions League ===
Home	Away

=== Italian Cup ===
Home	Away

=== Supercup ===
Home	Away

== Players ==
=== Current roster ===
Banco di Sardegna Sassari roster
Players
Coaches

Pos.	No.	Nat.	Name	Ht.	Wt.	Age
PG	0	(Italy)	Spissu, Marco	1.84 m (6 ft 0 in)	80 kg (176 lb)	31 – 5 February 1995
C	2	(Croatia)	Bilan, Miro	2.13 m (7 ft 0 in)	121 kg (267 lb)	37 – 21 July 1989
F	3	(Estonia)	Treier, Kaspar	2.04 m (6 ft 8 in)	105 kg (231 lb)	27 – 19 September 1999
G	4	(Serbia)	Pušica, Vasilije	1.96 m (6 ft 5 in)	92 kg (203 lb)	31 – 12 September 1995
G	5	(Italy)	Chessa, Massimo	1.88 m (6 ft 2 in)	80 kg (176 lb)	38 – 30 April 1988
SG	6	(Croatia)	Krušlin, Filip	1.98 m (6 ft 6 in)	94 kg (207 lb)	37 – 18 March 1989
F/C	7	(United States)	Happ, Ethan	2.08 m (6 ft 10 in)	108 kg (238 lb)	30 – 7 May 1996
G/F	8	(Italy)	Devecchi, Giacomo (C)	1.96 m (6 ft 5 in)	88 kg (194 lb)	41 – 2 April 1985
PG	10	(Croatia)	Katić, Toni	1.88 m (6 ft 2 in)	82 kg (181 lb)	34 – 9 July 1992
PG	13	(Italy)	Re, Marco Antonio	1.88 m (6 ft 2 in)	75 kg (165 lb)	26 – 13 July 2000
SF	14	(United States)	Burnell, Jason	2.01 m (6 ft 7 in)	100 kg (220 lb)	29 – 15 August 1997
F	20	(Lithuania)	Bendžius, Eimantas	2.07 m (6 ft 9 in)	102 kg (225 lb)	36 – 23 April 1990
C	21	(Italy)	Gandini, Luca	2.06 m (6 ft 9 in)	110 kg (243 lb)	40 – 7 November 1985
G	22	(Italy)	Gentile, Stefano	1.91 m (6 ft 3 in)	94 kg (207 lb)	36 – 20 September 1989

Head coach

- (Italy) Gianmarco Pozzecco

Assistant coach(es)

- (Italy) Edoardo Casalone
- (Italy) Giorgio Gerosa

Legend

- (C) Team captain
- Injured

- Roster
Updated: 21 May 2021

Note: Flags indicate national team eligibility at FIBA-sanctioned events. Players may hold other non-FIBA nationalities not displayed.

=== Depth chart ===
Pos.	Starting 5	Bench 1	Bench 2	Inactive
C	Miro Bilan	Luca Gandini
PF	Eimantas Bendžius	Ethan Happ
SF	Jason Burnell	Kaspar Treier	Giacomo Devecchi
SG	Stefano Gentile	Filip Krušlin	Marco Antonio Re
PG	Marco Spissu	Toni Katić	Massimo Chessa	Vasilije Pušica

6+6 format (colours: Italian or homegrown players; foreign players; young players)

=== Squad changes ===
==== In ====
No.	Pos.	Nat.	Name	Age	Moving from		Type	Ends	Transfer fee	Date	Source
14	SF	(United States)	Jason Burnell	23	Pallacanestro Cantù	(Italy)	1 year	June 2021	Free	12 June 2020	
4	G	(Serbia)	Vasilije Pušica	24	VL Pesaro	(Italy)	1 year	June 2021	Free	23 June 2020	
23	F/C	(United States)	Justin Tillman	24	Hapoel Gilboa Galil	(Israel)	1 year	June 2021	Free	24 June 2020	
3	F	(Estonia)	Kaspar Treier	20	Basket Ravenna	(Italy)	3 year	June 2023	Free	3 July 2020	
6	SG	(Croatia)	Filip Krušlin	31	Cedevita Olimpija	(Slovenia)	1 year	June 2021	Free	4 July 2020	
20	F	(Lithuania)	Eimantas Bendžius	30	Rytas Vilnius	(Lithuania)	1+1 years	June 2021	Free	7 July 2020	
21	C	(Italy)	Luca Gandini	34	Pallacanestro Varese	(Italy)	1 year	June 2021	Free	15 July 2020	
10	PG	(Croatia)	Toni Katić	28	Cibona	(Croatia)	1 year	June 2021	Undisclosed	7 November 2020	
5	G	(Italy)	Massimo Chessa	32	Napoli Basket	(Italy)	End of season	June 2021	Free	14 January 2021	
7	F/C	(United States)	Ethan Happ	24	Fortitudo Bologna	(Italy)	End of season	June 2021	Undisclosed	18 January 2021	

1. In players: Players who signed after the beginning of the season

==== Out ====
No.	Pos.	Nat.	Name	Age	Moving to		Type	Transfer fee	Date	Source
23	C	(The Bahamas)	Dwight Coleby	26	Merkezefendi Basket	(Turkey)	End of contract	Free	28 June 2020	
3	PG	(United States)	Jaime Smith	30	Pallacanestro Cantù	(Italy)	End of contract	Free	1 July 2020	
7	SF	(Italy)	Lorenzo Bucarelli	22	Eurobasket Roma	(Italy)	End of contract	Free	1 July 2020	
9	PF	(Lithuania)	Paulius Sorokas	28	Chieti Basket 1974	(Italy)	End of contract	Free	1 July 2020	
11	F	(United States)	Dwayne Evans	28	Ryukyu Golden Kings	(Japan)	End of contract	Free	1 July 2020	
15	C	(Italy)	Daniele Magro	33	Brescia Leonessa	(Italy)	End of contract	Free	1 July 2020	
21	SG	(United States)	Dyshawn Pierre	26	Fenerbahçe	(Turkey)	End of contract	Free	1 July 2020	
31	SG	(Italy)	Michele Vitali	28	Brose Bamberg	(Germany)	End of contract	Free	1 July 2020	
55	PG	(United States)	Curtis Jerrells	33	Anwil Włocławek	(Poland)	End of contract	Free	1 July 2020	
23	F/C	(United States)	Justin Tillman	24	Bursaspor	(Turkey)	Transfer	Undisclosed	8 January 2021	

1. Out players: Players who left before the end of the season

==== Confirmed ====
No.	Pos.	Nat.	Name	Age	Moving from		Type	Ends	Transfer fee	Date	Source
8	G/F	(Italy)	Giacomo Devecchi	35	Sutor Montegranaro	(Italy)	4 years	June 2023	Free	27 July 2006	
0	PG	(Italy)	Marco Spissu	25	Virtus Bologna	(Italy)	3 year	June 2022	Return from loan	15 July 2017	
22	SG	(Italy)	Stefano Gentile	30	Virtus Bologna	(Italy)	2 + 3 year	June 2023	Free	25 June 2018	
2	C	(Croatia)	Miro Bilan	30	ASVEL	(France)	1 + 1 year	June 2021	Free	13 July 2019	

==== Coach ====
Nat.	Name	Age.	Previous team		Type	Ends	Date	Source
(Italy)	Gianmarco Pozzecco	47	Fortitudo Bologna	(Italy)	3 years	June 2022	11 February 2019	

== Competitions ==
=== Supercup ===
Pos	Team	Pld	W	L	PF	PA	PD	Qualification
1	Banco di Sardegna Sassari	6	4	2	563	484	+79	Advance to Final Four
2	Happy Casa Brindisi	6	4	2	528	470	+58	
3	Carpegna Prosciutto Pesaro	6	4	2	498	435	+63	
4	Virtus Roma	6	0	6	394	594	−200	

Source: LegaBasket Serie A
Rules for classification: All points scored in extra period(s) were not counted in the standings, nor for any tie-break situation.

==== Final Four ====
18 September 2019 Semifinal	Banco di Sardegna Sassari	76–88	Segafredo Virtus Bologna	Bologna
20:45 (CEST)	Scoring by quarter: 24-19, 18-21, 17-22, 17-26
Eurosport	Pts: Bilan 24; Rebs: Bilan 13; Asts: Spissu 6 PIR: Bilan 37	Boxscore	Pts: Abass, Teodosić 13; Rebs: Gamble 8 Asts: Teodosić 6 PIR: Abass 16	Arena: Segafredo Arena; Referees: Tolga Sahin, Valerio Grigioni, Denis Quarta

=== Italian Cup ===
Sassari qualified to the 2021 Italian Basketball Cup by ending the first half of the LBA season in the 3rd position. They played the quarterfinal against the 6th ranking Carpegna Prosciutto Basket Pesaro.

12 February 2021 Quarterfinals	Banco di Sardegna Sassari	110–115(OT)	Carpegna Prosciutto Pesaro	Assago (Milan)
20:45	Scoring by quarter: 26-24, 27-25, 23-21, 23-29, Overtime: 11-16
Rai Sport, Eurosport	Pts: Bendžius 22; Rebs: Spissu 10; Asts: Spissu 9 PIR: Spissu 34	Boxscore	Pts: Robinson 27; Rebs: Filipovity 13; Asts: Robinson 27; PIR: Drell	Arena: Mediolanum Forum; Referees: Michele Rossi, Lorenzo Baldini, Christian Borgo

=== Serie A ===
==== Regular season ====
Pos	Team	Pld	W	L	PF	PA	PD	Qualification
3	Virtus Segafredo Bologna	28	19	9	2397	2168	+229	Qualification to Playoffs
4	Umana Reyer Venezia	28	19	9	2257	2142	+115	Qualification to Playoffs
5	Banco di Sardegna Sassari	28	18	10	2527	2437	+90	Qualification to Playoffs
6	De' Longhi Treviso	28	14	14	2353	2468	−115	Qualification to Playoffs
7	Allianz Pallacanestro Trieste	28	14	14	2253	2249	+4	Qualification to Playoffs

Updated to match(es) played on 10 May 2021. Source: LBA

==== Playoffs ====
===== Quarterfinals =====
13 May 2021 Game 1	Umana Reyer Venezia	92–91(OT) (Series: 1-0)	Banco di Sardegna Sassari	Mestre (Venice)
18:00 (CET)	Scoring by quarter: 14-24, 21-19, 27-20, 19-18, Overtime: 11-10
Rai Sport, Eurosport Player	Pts: Chappell 19; Rebs: Stone 8 Asts: De Nicolao 6 PIR: Stone 23	Boxscore	Pts: Bilan 19; Rebs: Bilan 11; Asts: Spissu 4 PIR: Bilan 34	Arena: Taliercio; Referees: Saverio Lanzarini, Alessandro Vicino, Fabrizio Paglialunga

14 May 2021 Game 2	Umana Reyer Venezia	83–78 (Series: 2-0)	Banco di Sardegna Sassari	Mestre (Venice)
18:00 (CET)	Scoring by quarter: 21-24, 16-23, 20-7, 26-24
Rai Sport, Eurosport Player	Pts: Tonut 25; Rebs: Watt 7 Asts: Stone, Watt 4 PIR: Tonut 27	Boxscore	Pts: Happ 14; Rebs: Burnell, Bendžius, Gentile 9 Asts: Spissu 5 PIR: Happ 20	Arena: Taliercio; Referees: Carmelo Paternicò, Beniamino Manuel Attard, Denny Borgioni

16 May 2021 Game 3	Banco di Sardegna Sassari	75–60 (Series: 1-2)	Umana Reyer Venezia	Sassari
20:45 (CET)	Scoring by quarter: 22-12, 24-14, 15-16, 14-18
Rai Sport, Eurosport Player	Pts: Spissu, Bendžius 13; Rebs: Bilan 7 Asts: Spissu, Burnell 4 PIR: Spissu, Happ 15	Boxscore	Pts: Tonut 17; Rebs: Stone, Daye 7 Asts: Tonut, Daye 3 PIR: Daye 18	Arena: PalaSerradimigni; Referees: Tolga Sahin, Carmelo Lo Guzzo, Andrea Bongiorni

18 May 2021 Game 4	Banco di Sardegna Sassari	86–73 (Series: 2-2)	Umana Reyer Venezia	Sassari
20:45 (CET)	Scoring by quarter: 20-6, 11-29, 28-24, 27-14
Rai Sport, Eurosport 2	Pts: Bendžius 25; Rebs: Burnell 8 Asts: Spissu 5 PIR: Bendžius 27	Boxscore	Pts: Jerrells 14; Rebs: Chappell 9 Asts: Chappell 5 PIR: Chappell 19	Arena: PalaSerradimigni; Referees: Michele Rossi, Alessandro Martolini, Guido Giovannetti

20 May 2021 Game 5	Umana Reyer Venezia	93–91 (Series: 3-2)	Banco di Sardegna Sassari	Mestre (Venice)
21:00 (CET)	Scoring by quarter: 24-23, 12-26, 27-28, 30-14
Rai Sport, Eurosport Player	Pts: Daye 20; Rebs: Tonut 7 Asts: Tonut 4 PIR: Tonut, Daye 22	Boxscore	Pts: Bilan 26; Rebs: Bendžius 9 Asts: Spissu, Gentile 5 PIR: Bilan 27	Arena: Taliercio; Referees: Manuel Mazzoni, Mark Bartoli, Denny Borgioni

=== Champions League ===
==== Regular season ====
Pos	Team	Pld	W	L	PF	PA	PD	Pts	Qualification
1	(Spain) Iberostar Tenerife	6	4	2	552	507	+45	10	Advance to Playoffs
2	(Italy) Dinamo Sassari	6	4	2	524	529	−5	10	Advance to Playoffs
3	(Denmark) Bakken Bears	6	3	3	523	507	+16	9	
4	(Turkey) Galatasaray	6	1	5	495	551	−56	7	

Source: Champions League

==== Play-offs ====
Pos	Team	Pld	W	L	PF	PA	PD	Pts	Qualification
1	(Czech Republic) ERA Nymburk	6	5	1	532	497	+35	11	Advance to Final Eight
2	(Spain) Casademont Zaragoza	6	4	2	521	522	−1	10	Advance to Final Eight
3	(Germany) Brose Bamberg	6	2	4	513	504	+9	8	
4	(Italy) Dinamo Sassari	6	1	5	502	545	−43	7	

Source: Champions League

== See also ==
- 2020–21 LBA season
- 2020–21 Basketball Champions League
- 2021 Italian Basketball Cup
- 2020 Italian Basketball Supercup
