= KK Cedevita =

Defunct basketball club in Zagreb, Croatia

Cedevita
- Founded: 14 August 1991; 35 years ago
- Folded: 2019; 7 years ago
- History: KK Botinec (1991–1994); KK Hiron Botinec (1994–2005); KK Cedevita (2005–2019); KK Cedevita Olimpija (2019–present)
- Arena: Dom sportova (capacity: 3,100); Dražen Petrović Basketball Hall (capacity: 5,400)
- Location: Zagreb, Croatia
- Team colors: Orange, White, Black, Sky Blue
- Main sponsor: Cedevita
- Ownership: Atlantic Grupa
- Championships: 5 Croatian Championships; 7 Croatian Cups; 3 Croatian Supercups; 1 ABA League Supercup
- Retired numbers: 1 (45)

Košarkaški klub Cedevita, also known as Cedevita Zagreb, was a men's professional basketball club based in Zagreb, Croatia.

Founded in 1946, the club had won 5 consecutive Croatian Championships, seven national cup titles, three national supercup titles, and one ABA League Supercup title. In July 2019, they merged with Olimpija Ljubljanja, forming a new club Cedevita Olimpija.

== History ==
=== Botinec ===
The club was established in Zagreb in 1991 as KK Botinec, later becoming KK Hiron Botinec for sponsorship reasons. From season to season, the club moved up from the lowest levels of competition until it reached the Premijer liga (Croatian basketball) in 2002. In its first season of elite competition, it took 5th place in Croatia, behind the well-known clubs KK Cibona, KK Zadar, KK Zagreb and KK Split.

=== New name ===
A change was made in 2005 when Atlantic Grupa, a regional company, became the main sponsor of the club, after which the club was renamed to KK Cedevita. The board of directors raised the ambitions of the club, which achieved success first in the 09–10 Season when it finished at 3rd place in the Croatian league (in the semi-final playoffs Zadar-Cedevita 2–1), played the semi-finals of the Croatian Cup along with taking 7th place in the regional Adriatic League as a newcomer. Cedevita played EuroCup Final Four. After a regular 1st place in the Croatian league, Cedevita won the semi-final playoffs, but lost the finals. Also, Cedevita again took 7th place in Adriatic League. First trophies came in 11–12 season with Cup Dražen Petrović and Croatian National Cup Krešimir Ćosić, also with the finals of the ABA league. First Croatian Champions title Croatian league came in the 13–14 season, also with the second Cup Krešimir Ćosić title and the second finals in the ABA league. Cedevita took two U–18 and one Under-16 Croatian championship titles.

=== The first national titles (2011–2013) ===
The club logo used from 2005 to 2016

The season with the greatest success was from 2011–12, with first-ever trophies for the team. After winning the Cup Dražen Petrović (Croatian Supercup) against Zagreb, Cedevita took Croatian Cup Krešimir Ćosić for the first time in history, playing against Zagreb again in the finals. After 2nd place in the Croatian league, Cedevita won split in semi-final playoffs but ultimately lost the finals against Cibona.

The new coach was Božidar Maljković, Dražen Anzulović, who led Cedevita in season, 2011–12. Over the past few years, former Croatian and Bosnian National team members played for the team, including Slaven Rimac, Jurica Žuža, Damir Milačić, Krešimir Novosel, Mate Miliša, Milan Parezanović, Pero Dujmović, Stipe Modrić, Frano Čolak, alongside several excellent American players such as A. J. Guyton, Marlon Garnett, Adam Harrington, God Shammgod, Vonteego Cummings or Ramel Bradley.

The 2012–13 season was marked by the arrival of the four times European Champion, coach Božidar Maljković for the first time ever participation of the club in the EuroLeague. Three national team members, Marko Tomas, Lukša Andrić and Luka Babić joined the club, as well as stars like Mickaël Gelabale or Vlado Ilievski. Cedevita achieved its first victories at the highest level in Europe, but without passing to the TOP 16. After Maljković left the club, Aleksandar Petrović became the new coach, but he also left the club. Cedevita won the 6th place, enough for the participation in the EuroCup's next season. Before leaving, coach Petrović played the Cup finals, and interim coach Jakša Vulić reach the semifinals of the Croatian A-1 League play off. In younger selections, juniors became vice champions of Croatia and cadets, young cadets and Under-12 team played in Final four.

=== Five Croatian League titles (2013–2019) ===
The 2013–14 season started with big change on the bench, with the arrival of Jasmin Repeša. He had 19-year-old Jusuf Nurkić and 16-year-old Lovro Mazalin, with main players from season before, and newly signed Ante Delaš, Tomislav Zubčić, Ivan Ramljak, Nolan Smith and Allan Ray. Cedevita has won the national cup. In Final four tournament of ABA league in Belgrade, Cedevita defeated Partizan, but lost in the final to Cibona. The best came at the end of the season, with the first Croatian title and great 3–0 victory in the series against Cibona. Cedevita has won the new title in junior competition and became U–18 Croatian champion.

In the 2014–15 season Cedevita became Croatian champion again, with a win 3–1 in the playoffs final vs Cibona, won Krešimir Ćosić Cup again and played ABA league final.

The 2015–16 season brought a new coach, Veljko Mršić and Gianmarco Pozzecco as assistant, bringing more domestic titles. In 2016–17, they became 4th-time champions with 5th time Croatian Cup. Miro Bilan, Marko Arapović, Filip Krušlin and Luka Babić played at the Olympic Games in Rio. In 2017–18 season, the club started with the coach Jure Zdovc and assistant Slaven Rimac winning the first ever ABA League Supercup. This season is a record in Croatia because Cedevita won the 2017–18 A-1 League, also the cup title. After top-16 in Eurocup, Cedevita reaches semifinals of 2017–18 ABA League. Džanan Musa was EuroCup Basketball Rising Star 2017–18 EuroCup Basketball and ABA League Top Prospect 2017–18 ABA League First Division. In 2018-2019 season, first coach was Sito Alonso. The season was one of the worst in club history - poor results in the ABA League and the EuroCup lead to Alonso's firing and the hiring of former player Slaven Rimac. While the results improved, Cedevita was eliminated in EuroCup and the semifinals of the ABA League. Cedevita won Krešimir Ćosić Cup, but suffered a complete fiasco in the 2018–19 A-1 League, barely qualifying to the finals and getting swept by KK Cibona.

=== Merge with Olimpija Ljubljana ===
On June 4, 2019, it was announced that Cedevita is about to merge with Slovenian team Olimpija Ljubljana and form Cedevita Olimpija. Some departments of the club, such as the youth academy, are planned to stay in Zagreb and continue as KK Cedevita Junior. In June 2019, Cedevita had applied for a change of headquarters to Ljubljana, Slovenia. Upon the decision of resettlement, followed by the confirmation of both assemblies, Cedevita Zagreb and Olimpija Ljubljana made the association of clubs. KK Cedevita Olimpija was established on July 8 in Arena Stožice. The club was a founding member of the Adriatic Basketball Association. In December 2020, the club's shares were transferred to Cedevita Olimpija.

== Home arenas ==
Since the summer of 2019, the club has played their home games at the Cedevita Basketball Dome, which is located in the Zagreb Fair in Zagreb.

== Honours ==
=== KK Cedevita ===
Total titles: 16

Honours		No.	Years
National league – 5
Croatian League	Winners	5	2013–14, 2014–15, 2015–16, 2016–17, 2017–18
Croatian League	Runners-up	3	2010–11, 2011–12, 2018–19
National cup – 7
Krešimir Ćosić Cup	Winners	7	2012, 2014, 2015, 2016, 2017, 2018, 2019
Krešimir Ćosić Cup	Runners-up	3	2013, 2022, 2023
National Supercup – 3
Dražen Petrović Cup	Winners	3	2011, 2014, 2015
Dražen Petrović Cup	Runners-up	1	2013
Regional competitions – 1
ABA League	Runners-up	4	2011–12, 2013–14, 2014–15, 2016–17
ABA League Supercup	Winners	1	2017
European competitions – 0
EuroCup	Third place	1	2010–11

== Identity ==
After the company Cedevita changed its brand colors from red to orange in 2015, the basketball club also re-branded and adopted orange as its main color for the 2016–17 season.

== Players ==
=== Notable players ===
Note: Flags indicate national team eligibility at FIBA-sanctioned events. Players may hold other non-FIBA nationalities not displayed.

Criteria

To appear in this section a player must have either:

- Set a club record or won an individual award while at the club
- Played at least one official international match for their national team at any time
- Played at least one official NBA match at any time.

- (Armenia) Ryan Boatright
- (Belize) Marlon Garnett
- (Bosnia and Herzegovina) Nemanja Gordić
- (Bosnia and Herzegovina) Bariša Krasić
- (Bosnia and Herzegovina) Ante Mašić
- (Bosnia and Herzegovina) Džanan Musa
- (Bosnia and Herzegovina) Jusuf Nurkić
- (Bosnia and Herzegovina) Ivan Opačak
- (Bosnia and Herzegovina) Andrija Stipanović
- (Brazil) Vítor Benite
- (Brazil) Augusto Lima
- (Canada) Jermaine Anderson
- (Croatia) Lukša Andrić
- (Croatia) Marko Arapović
- (Croatia) Luka Babić
- (Croatia) Dalibor Bagarić
- (Croatia) Marko Banić
- (Croatia) Stanko Barać
- (Croatia) Marino Baždarić
- (Croatia) Miro Bilan
- (Croatia) Ivan Buva
- (Croatia) Marko Car
- (Croatia) Ante Delaš
- (Croatia) Mario Delaš
- (Croatia) Dontaye Draper
- (Croatia) Duje Dukan
- (Croatia) Vladimir Krstić
- (Croatia) Filip Krušlin
- (Croatia) Fran Pilepić
- (Croatia) Ivan Ramljak
- (Croatia) Slaven Rimac
- (Croatia) Damjan Rudež
- (Croatia) Marko Tomas
- (Croatia) Roko Ukić
- (Croatia) Tomislav Zubčić
- (Croatia) Andrija Žižić
- (France) Mickaël Gelabale
- (Georgia (country)) Jacob Pullen
- (North Macedonia) Marques Green
- (North Macedonia) Vlado Ilievski
- (Slovenia) Mirza Begić
- (Slovenia) Edo Murić
- (Slovenia) Matjaž Smodiš
- (Spain) Pablo Aguilar
- (Panama) Chris Warren
- (United States) Will Cherry
- (United States) Vonteego Cummings
- (United States) Corsley Edwards
- (United States) A. J. Guyton
- (United States) Adam Harrington
- (United States) Pierre Jackson
- (United States) Josh Magette
- (United States) Kevin Murphy
- (United States) Demetris Nichols
- (United States) Josh Selby
- (United States) Chris Owens
- (United States) Allan Ray
- (United States) God Shammgod
- (United States) Nolan Smith
- (United States) Henry Walker
- (United States) James White
- (United States) Bracey Wright

=== Retired numbers ===
Cedevita Zagreb retired numbers
No	Nat.	Player	Position	Tenure	Date retired
45	(Croatia)	Marino Baždarić	SF	2010–2014	2015

== Season-by-season ==
=== Cedevita (2009–2019) ===
Seasons	Adriatic League	Croatian League	Cup	ABA League Supercup	European competitions	Head coach	Roster
2009–10	7th place	3rd place	Semifinalist	—N/a	EuroChallenge; Regular season	Slobodan Subotić, Aleksandar Petrović	Srđan Subotić, Nino Primorac, Bariša Krasić, Andrija Žižić, Damjan Rudež, Tomislav Petrović, Hrvoje Kovačević, Jermaine Anderson, Ricardo Marsh, Franko Kaštropil, Ivan Opačak, Dino Butorac, Marino Baždarić, Thomas Mobley, Vladimir Kuljanin
2010–11	7th place	Finalist	Semifinalist	—N/a	Eurocup; 3rd place	Aleksandar Petrović	Dontaye Draper, Vladimir Krstić, Robert Troha, Andrija Žižić, Damjan Rudež, Tomislav Petrović, Hrvoje Kovačević, Corsley Edwards, Vedran Vukušić, Franko Kaštropil, Vedran Princ, Dino Butorac, Marino Baždarić, Aaron Pettway, Trent Plaisted, Bracey Wright
2011–12	Finalist	Finalist	Champion	—N/a	Eurocup; Regular season	Dražen Anzulović	Dontaye Draper, Matjaž Smodiš, Marko Car, Filip Kraljević, Chris Warren, Tomislav Petrović, Ivan Opačak, Miro Bilan, Vedran Vukušić, Dalibor Bagarić, Vedran Princ, Chris Owens, Marino Baždarić, Martin Junaković, Jakov Mustapić, Karlo Lebo
2012–13	6th place	3rd place	Finalist	—N/a	Euroleague; Regular season	Božidar Maljković, Aleksandar Petrović, Jakša Vulić	Marques Green, Bracey Wright, Marko Car, Mickaël Gelabale, Curtis Stinson, Derwin Kitchen, Vlado Ilievski, Miro Bilan, Lukša Andrić, Predrag Šuput, Ante Mašić, Goran Suton, Marino Baždarić, Marko Tomas, Roko Rogić, Karlo Lebo, Luka Babić, Jusuf Nurkić, Ivan Buva
2013–14	Finalist	Champion	Champion	—N/a	Eurocup; Last 32	Jasmin Repeša	Miro Bilan, Goran Suton, Marino Baždarić, Marko Tomas, Karlo Lebo, Luka Babić, Jusuf Nurkić, Ivan Ramljak, Lovro Mazalin, Tomislav Zubčić, Ante Delaš, Nolan Smith, Ivo Baltić, Josh Selby, Allan Ray, Filip Bundović, Dorian Jelenek, Jakov Mustapić
2014–15	Finalist	Champion	Champion	—N/a	Euroleague; Regular season Eurocup 1/8 Finals	Jasmin Repeša	Miro Bilan, Mario Delaš, Roko Ukić, Marko Tomas, Nemanja Gordić, Luka Babić, Marko Arapović, Ivan Ramljak, Lovro Mazalin, Tomislav Zubčić, Ante Delaš, Karlo Žganec, Fran Pilepić, Ivan Vučić, Markus Lončar, Stanko Barać
2015–16	Semifinalist	Champion	Champion	—N/a	Euroleague; Top 16	Veljko Mršić	Miro Bilan, Jacob Pullen, Nemanja Gordić, Luka Babić, Marko Arapović, Henry Walker, Lovro Mazalin, Tomislav Zubčić, Karlo Žganec, Fran Pilepić, James White, Luka Žorić, Toni Katić, Džanan Musa
2016–17	Finalist	Champion	Champion	—N/a	EuroCup; Top 16	Veljko Mršić	Miro Bilan, Luka Babić, Marko Arapović, Karlo Žganec, Toni Katić, Džanan Musa, Marko Tomas, Ra'Shad James, Markus Lončar, Scotty Hopson, Karlo Mikšić, Luka Barišić, Filip Krušlin, Ivan Vučić, Mirza Begić, Ivan Zebić, Darko Bajo, Toni Perković, Antonio Jordano, Roko Rogić, Lovro Buljević, Filip Bundović, Marko Ramljak, John Shurna, Ryan Boatright, David Stockton, Duje Dukan, Pierre Jackson
2017–18	Semifinalist	Champion	Champion	Champion	EuroCup; Top 16	Jure Zdovc	Roko Ukić, Demetris Nichols, Damir Markota, Andrija Stipanović, Filip Krušlin, Chris Johnson, Will Cherry, Džanan Musa, Ivan Ramljak, Toni Katić, Darko Bajo, Karlo Žganec, Nik Slavica, Lovro Buljević, Antonio Jordano, Toni Perković, Marko Arapović, Kevin Murphy
2018–19	Semifinalist	Finalist	Champion	Semifinalist	EuroCup; Top 16	Sito Alonso, Slaven Rimac (B team: Slaven Rimac, Ivan Kapov, Dražen Orešković)	Andrija Stipanović, Justin Cobbs, Filip Krušlin, Toni Katić, Vítor Benite, Josh Magette, Karlo Žganec, Augusto Lima, Domagoj Bošnjak, Elgin Cook, Ivan Ramljak, James Bell, Pablo Aguilar, Tyler Wideman, Toni Perković, Mateo Vidović, Toni Katić, Darko Bajo, Andrija Ćorić, Domagoj Bošnjak, Toni Vitali, Lovro Buljević, Antonio Jordano, Rok Radović, Karlo Matković, Josip Popić, Fran Jacović, Jakov Mustapić, Jacob Pullen, Marko Banić, Edo Murić, Jakov Vladović

== Head coaches ==
Botinec (1991–2005)

- 1991–1993: (Croatia) Tomislav Mlinar
- 1993–1994: (Croatia) Roland Janković
- 1994–1998: (Croatia) Antonio Ozmec
- 1998–2003: (Croatia) Jakša Vulić
- 2003–2004: (Croatia) Dejan Jovović; Jakša Vulić
- 2004–2005: (Croatia) Jakša Vulić

Cedevita (2005–2019)

- 2005–2006: (Croatia) Srećko Medvedec; Rudolf Jugo
- 2006–2007: (Croatia) Jakša Vulić
- 2007–2008: (Croatia) Jakša Vulić; Zdravko Radulović
- 2008–2009: (Croatia) Zdravko Radulović; Ivan Meheš (1 game); Zoran Kalpić (6 games); Srećko Medvedec
- 2009–2010: (Slovenia) Slobodan Subotić; (Croatia) Aleksandar Petrović (4 games)
- 2010–2011: (Croatia) Aleksandar Petrović; Ivan Rudež (1 game)
- 2011–2012: (Croatia) Dražen Anzulović
- 2012–2013: (Serbia) Božidar Maljković; (Croatia) Jakša Vulić (2 games); Aleksandar Petrović (19 games); Jakša Vulić
- 2013–2015: (Croatia) Jasmin Repeša; Veljko Mršić (15 games)
- 2015–2017: (Croatia) Veljko Mršić; (Italy) Gianmarco Pozzecco (2 games)
- 2017–2018: (Slovenia) Jure Zdovc
- 2018–2019: (Spain) Sito Alonso; (Croatia) Slaven Rimac

== Management ==
=== Presidents ===
- (Croatia) Mladen Veber (2008–2018)
- (Croatia) Emil Tedeschi (2018–2019)
- (Croatia) Neven Vranković (2019)

=== General managers / Directors ===
- (Croatia) Krešimir Novosel (2007–2015)
- (Croatia) Davor Užbinec (2015–2019)
- (Croatia) Tomislav Zebić (2019)

=== Sports directors ===
- (Croatia) Matej Mamić (2008–2018)
- (Croatia) Veljko Mršić (2018–2019)
- (Croatia) Marino Baždarić (2019)

=== Team managers ===
- (Croatia) Mate Skelin (2009–2017)
- (Croatia) Matko Jovanović (2017–2019)
- (Croatia) Zdravko Vučković (2020–2021)

== See also ==
- KK Cedevita in European competitions
