= 2015–16 Turkish Basketball Second League =

The TB2L 2015–16 season of the Turkish Basketball Second League, which is the third-tier level league of the basketball league club system in Turkey.

== Regular season ==
=== Group A ===
Pos	Team	Pld	W	L	PF	PA	PD	Pts	Qualification or relegation
1	Samsun Büyükşehir Bld. Anakent sk	22	21	1	1632	1311	+321	43	Qualification to the Play-Off Stage
2	İstanbul Beylikdüzü	22	17	5	1586	1340	+246	39	Qualification to the Play-Off Stage
3	Selçuklu Belediyesi	22	12	10	1646	1551	+95	34	Qualification to the Play-Off Stage
4	Yalova Group Belediye Spor	22	12	10	1545	1545	0	34	Qualification to the Play-Off Stage
5	Tofaş Gelişim	22	11	11	1596	1654	−58	33	Qualification to the Play-Off Stage
6	Maliye Milli Piyango	22	10	12	1599	1641	−42	32	Qualification to the Play-Off Stage
7	Boluspor	22	10	12	1516	1614	−98	32	Qualification to the Play-Off Stage
8	Tenis Eskrim Dağcılık	22	9	13	1551	1636	−85	31	Qualification to the Play-Off Stage
9	FMV Işıkspor	22	8	14	1442	1547	−105	30	
10	Çorlu Belediyesi	22	8	14	1527	1595	−68	30	Relegation to EBBL
11	68 Aksaray Belediye	22	8	14	1506	1608	−102	30	Relegation to EBBL
12	Pınar Karşıyaka Gelişim	22	6	16	1551	1655	−104	28	Relegation to EBBL

Source: TB2L

=== Group B ===
Pos	Team	Pld	W	L	PF	PA	PD	Pts	Qualification or relegation
1	Bursaspor	22	21	1	1926	1376	+550	43	Qualification to the Play-Off Stage
2	Orman Gençlikspor	22	20	2	1698	1427	+271	42	Qualification to the Play-Off Stage
3	Mersin Büyükşehir Belediyesi	22	17	5	1632	1452	+180	39	Qualification to the Play-Off Stage
4	Zirve Üniversitesi	22	12	10	1605	1577	+28	34	Qualification to the Play-Off Stage
5	Kepez Belediyesi	22	12	10	1535	1571	−36	34	Qualification to the Play-Off Stage
6	Yeşilyurt	22	10	12	1617	1607	+10	32	Qualification to the Play-Off Stage
7	Muğla Ormanspor	22	10	12	1592	1668	−76	32	Qualification to the Play-Off Stage
8	1881 Düzce Belediye	22	10	12	1628	1694	−66	32	Qualification to the Play-Off Stage
9	İzmir Büyükşehir Belediyesi	22	9	13	1528	1589	−61	31	
10	Trakya Üniversitesi	22	6	16	1515	1704	−189	28	Relegated to EBBL
11	Gemlik Gücümspor	22	4	18	1661	1826	−165	26	Relegated to EBBL
12	İstanbul Teknik Üniversitesi	22	1	21	1558	2004	−446	23	Relegated to EBBL

Source: TB2L
