= Will Cherry =

American basketball player

No. 29 – Dorados de Chihuahua
- Position: Point guard
- League: LNBP

Personal information
- Born: February 8, 1991 (age 35) Oakland, California, U.S.
- Listed height: 6 ft 1 in (1.85 m)
- Listed weight: 176 lb (80 kg)

Career information
- High school: McClymonds (Oakland, California)
- College: Montana (2009–2013)
- NBA draft: 2013: undrafted
- Playing career: 2013–present

Career history
- 2014: Canton Charge
- 2014: Cleveland Cavaliers
- 2014–2015: Žalgiris Kaunas
- 2015–2016: Alba Berlin
- 2016–2017: Gaziantep
- 2017–2018: Cedevita Zagreb
- 2018–2019: Santa Cruz Warriors
- 2019–2020: Olympiacos
- 2020: Pallacanestro Reggiana
- 2021: Hapoel Eilat
- 2021: U-BT Cluj-Napoca
- 2021–2022: Skyliners Frankfurt
- 2022–2023: Riesen Ludwigsburg
- 2023–2024: Shahrdari Gorgan BC
- 2024–2025: Al Ittihad Alexandria
- 2025: Cocodrilos de Caracas
- 2025: Gladiadores de Anzoátegui
- 2026: JL Bourg
- 2026: Boulazac Basket Dordogne
- 2026–present: Dorados de Chihuahua

Career highlights
- Lithuanian League champion (2015); Croatian League champion (2018); German Cup winner (2016); Croatian Cup winner (2018); ABA League Supercup winner (2017); Croatian Cup MVP (2018); 3× First-team All-Big Sky (2011–2013); 2× Big Sky Defensive Player of the Year (2012, 2013)
- Stats at NBA.com
- Stats at Basketball Reference

Will Cherry (born February 8, 1991) is an American professional basketball player for the Dorados de Chihuahua of the Liga Nacional de Baloncesto Profesional (LNBP). He played college basketball for the University of Montana, where he was named Big Sky Conference Defensive Player of the Year in 2012 and 2013. Cherry had a short stint in the NBA with the Cleveland Cavaliers before playing in Lithuania, Germany, Turkey, Croatia, Greece and Italy.

== High school career ==
Cherry attended McClymonds High School in Oakland, California. As a senior, he averaged 12.0 points, 8.0 rebounds, 5.0 assists, and a league-leading 4.0 steals per game for the undefeated (33–0) Warriors, going on to be named league and team MVP.

== College career ==
In 116 career collegiate games for the Montana Grizzlies (104 starts), Cherry averaged 12.8 points on .430 shooting with 3.6 rebounds, 3.4 assists, and 2.3 steals in 30.7 minutes per game. He was named first team All-Big Sky Conference three times, was the Big Sky Defensive Player of the year in 2011–12 and 2012–13, and is seventh on the school's all-time scoring list with 1,484 points.

== Professional career ==
=== 2013–14 season ===
After going undrafted in the 2013 NBA draft, Cherry joined the New Orleans Pelicans for the 2013 NBA Summer League. On February 13, 2014, he was acquired by the Canton Charge of the NBA Development League.

=== 2014–15 season ===
In July 2014, Cherry joined the Cleveland Cavaliers for the 2014 NBA Summer League. On August 3, 2014, he signed with the Toronto Raptors. However, he was later waived by the Raptors on October 25, 2014. On November 2, 2014, Cherry was reacquired by the Canton Charge. Later that day, he signed with the Cleveland Cavaliers. On November 30, 2014, he was waived by the Cavaliers after appearing in eight games and averaging 1.9 points and 1 assist per game. On December 7, 2014, Cherry signed with Žalgiris Kaunas of Lithuania for the rest of the season. On June 6, 2015, he helped Žalgiris win their fifth straight LKL championship.

=== 2015–16 season ===
In July 2015, Cherry joined the San Antonio Spurs for the 2015 NBA Summer League. On September 1, 2015, he signed with Alba Berlin of Germany for the 2015–16 season. With Alba, he won the German Cup in 2016.

=== 2016–17 season ===
In August 2016, Cherry signed with Gaziantep Basketbol of the Turkish Basketball Super League.

=== 2017–18 season ===
On July 29, 2017, Cherry signed with Croatian team Cedevita Zagreb for the 2017–18 season.

=== 2018–19 season ===
On October 8, 2018, Cherry signed with the Golden State Warriors. He was waived three days later. He was added to the Warriors’ G League affiliate, the Santa Cruz Warriors. In 46 games played for the Warriors, he averaged 9.1 points, 4.2 assist and 1.6 steals per game.

=== 2019–20 season ===
On April 13, 2019, Cherry signed with Olympiacos of the Greek Basket League for the rest of the season. On July 23, 2019, Cherry signed a one-year contract extension with Olympiacos. On January 15, 2020, Cherry and Olympiacos officially parted ways. He signed with Pallacanestro Reggiana of Lega Basket Serie A (LBA) on January 26.

=== 2021–22 season ===
In 2021, Cherry played one game for Hapoel Eilat of the Israeli Basketball Premier League. On September 29, 2021, he signed with Cluj of the Romanian Liga Națională. On October 30, 2021, Cherry signed with Skyliners Frankfurt of the German Basketball Bundesliga.

=== 2022–23 season ===
On December 29, 2022, he signed with MHP Riesen Ludwigsburg of the German Basketball Bundesliga (BBL).

== Career statistics ==
Legend
GP	Games played	GS	Games started	MPG	Minutes per game
FG%	Field-goal percentage	3P%	3-point field-goal percentage	FT%	Free-throw percentage
RPG	Rebounds per game	APG	Assists per game	SPG	Steals per game
BPG	Blocks per game	PPG	Points per game	PIR	Performance index rating
**Bold**	Career high

=== NBA ===
==== Regular season ====
Year	Team	GP	GS	MPG	FG%	3P%	FT%	RPG	APG	SPG	BPG	PPG
2014–15	Cleveland	8	0	8.6	.263	.222	.500	.6	1.0	.8	.1	1.9
Career		8	0	8.6	.263	.222	.500	.6	1.0	.8	.1	1.9

=== EuroLeague ===
Year	Team	GP	GS	MPG	FG%	3P%	FT%	RPG	APG	SPG	BPG	PPG	PIR
2014–15	Žalgiris	15	6	18.5	.395	.368	.708	2.4	1.7	1.0	.1	7.1	6.3
2019–20	Olympiacos	13	5	21.0	.431	.364	.667	2.0	1.7	0.8	.1	5.4	4.3
Career		28	11	19.7	.419	.367	.690	2.2	1.7	0.9	.1	6.3	5.4

== Personal life ==
Cherry is the son of Yvette Martin, and has a younger brother, Marsean.

On April 27, 2013, Cherry was arrested for disorderly conduct and resisting arrest after he was involved in a fight in front of Stockman's Bar in Missoula, Montana.
