= Toni Perković =

Croatian basketball player

No. 13 – Forlì 2.015
- Position: Shooting guard
- League: Serie A2

Personal information
- Born: April 10, 1998 (age 28) Pula, Croatia
- Listed height: 1.91 m (6 ft 3 in)
- Listed weight: 83 kg (183 lb)

Career information
- Playing career: 2015–present

Career history
- 2015–2017: KK Stoja
- 2017–2019: Cedevita
- 2019–2022: Split
- 2022–2023: Orléans Loiret
- 2023–2024: Split
- 2024–2025: Forlì 2.015
- 2025: Neftçi
- 2026: Fortitudo Bologna
- 2026–present: Forlì 2.015

Career highlights
- Croatian League champion (2018); 2× Croatian Cup winner (2018, 2019); ABA Supercup (2017)
Medals
Men's basketball
Representing Croatia
FIBA Europe Under-20 Championship Division B
Silver medal – second place	2017 Romania	U-20 Team
FIBA Europe Under-20 Championship
Silver medal – second place	2018 Germany	U-20 Team

Toni Perković (born April 10, 1998) is a Croatian professional basketball player for Pallacanestro Forlì 2.015 of the Italian Serie A2. He has also represented the Croatian national team internationally.

== Career ==
Toni is currently playing for Fortitudo Bologna of the Italian basketball league Serie A2. Standing at 1.91 m (6 ft 3 in), he plays as a shooting guard.

After progressing through the youth ranks of Cedevita Zagreb, he made his senior team debut in 2017. During his time with the club, he won the 2017–18 A-1 League and the 2017 ABA Supercup, as well as two Croatian Cups (2018, 2019).

In 2019, he transferred to KK Split, where he spent three seasons between 2019 and 2022. In his final year with the team, he averaged 14.6 points per game in the Croatian League and 10.8 points per game in the ABA League.

For the 2022–23 season, Perković signed with Orléans Loiret Basket in France's second division, recording averages of 9.3 points per game. Following his spell in France, he returned to KK Split, once again competing in both the domestic league and the ABA League. He finished the season averaging 11.8 points per game nationally and 10.9 points in the Adriatic League.

In November 2024, Perković joined Pallacanestro Forlì 2.015 of Italy's Serie A2, initially signed amid long-term injury issues sidelining small forward Shawn Dawson. In January, the club opted not to exercise the exit clause in his contract, confirming him with the team through the remainder of the season. He emerged as Forlì's leading scorer, averaging 15.4 points across 30 regular-season games. A knee inflammation hampered him during the playoffs, causing him to miss Game 5 of the quarterfinals against Cividale and Game 1 of the semifinals versus Rimini, while also limiting his effectiveness in the remaining games of the series, which Forlì ultimately lost.

In August 2025, he moved to Neftçi İK of Azerbaijan, runners-up in the 2024–25 national championship and qualifiers for the FIBA Europe Cup. In the European competition, Perković averaged 13.8 points per game over six appearances.

After the first part of the season in Azerbaijan, he returned to Italy on January 8, 2026, signing a three-month contract with Fortitudo Bologna in Serie A2, with an option to extend until the end of the season. In mid-March, his stay was confirmed through the conclusion of the season.

== National Team ==
Perković played for the Croatia men's national basketball team. He was named to Croatia's 12-man roster for the 2022 FIBA EuroBasket by head coach Damir Mulaomerović.

== Personal life ==
Toni's brother is the professional football player Mauro Perkovic who currently plays for KS Cracovia.
