= 2017 ABA League Supercup =

- Season: 2017–18
- Dates: September 20–23, 2017
- Games played: 11
- Teams: 8

Regular season
- Top seed: (Serbia) Crvena zvezda mts (withdrew) (Croatia) Cedevita
- Season MVP: (Bosnia and Herzegovina) Andrija Stipanović (Cedevita)

Finals
- Champions: (Croatia) Cedevita (1st title)
- Runners-up: (Montenegro) Budućnost VOLI
- Third place: (Serbia) Mega Bemax
- Fourth place: (Montenegro) Mornar
- All statistics correct as of September 23, 2017.

The 2017 ABA League Supercup was the inaugural tournament of the ABA League Supercup, featuring teams from the Adriatic League First Division. The tournament took place in Bar, Montenegro.

== Participants ==
Based on the results in the 2016–17 ABA League season there was 8 participants at the 2017 Supercup.

- (Serbia) ~~Crvena zvezda mts~~ (1st, withdrew)
- (Croatia) Cedevita (2nd)
- (Serbia) Partizan NIS (3rd)
- (Montenegro) Budućnost VOLI (4th)
- (Bosnia and Herzegovina) Igokea (5th)
- (Serbia) Mega Bemax (6th)
- (Croatia) Cibona (7th)
- (Montenegro) Mornar (8th, host)
- (Serbia) FMP (9th, replacement)

Crvena zvezda canceled their participation at the Supercup, due to their previously scheduled Euroleague tournament, which was held on the same period. The 9th placed team, the FMP, is invited for replacement.

== Venue ==
Bar	2017 ABA League Supercup (Yugoslavia)
Topolica Sport Hall	2017 ABA League Supercup (Yugoslavia)
Capacity: 3,000	2017 ABA League Supercup (Yugoslavia)

== Bracket ==
Quarterfinals
20 September
(Croatia) Cedevita	86
(Serbia) FMP	68
20 September
(Bosnia and Herzegovina) Igokea	72
(Serbia) Mega Bemax	83
20 September
(Montenegro) Budućnost VOLI	96
(Croatia) Cibona	90
20 September
(Montenegro) Mornar	91
(Serbia) Partizan NIS	77

Semifinals
22 September
(Croatia) Cedevita	99
(Serbia) Mega Bemax	96
22 September
(Montenegro) Budućnost VOLI	82
(Montenegro) Mornar	65

Final
23 September
(Croatia) Cedevita	78
(Montenegro) Budućnost VOLI	69
Third place game
23 September
(Serbia) Mega Bemax	20
(Montenegro) Mornar	0

5th–8th place bracket

5th–8th place semifinals
21 September
(Serbia) FMP	71
(Bosnia and Herzegovina) Igokea	80
21 September
(Croatia) Cibona	76
(Serbia) Partizan NIS	83

Fifth place game
23 September
(Bosnia and Herzegovina) Igokea	74
(Serbia) Partizan NIS	64
Seventh place game
22 September
(Serbia) FMP	91
(Croatia) Cibona	75

Source: ABA Supercup

== Quarterfinals ==
=== Cedevita v FMP ===
20 September 2017
14:30 (CEST)

Boxscore

Cedevita (Croatia)	86–68	(Serbia) FMP
Scoring by quarter: 20–22, 21–11, 16–15, 29–20
Pts: Musa 16; Rebs: Stipanović 6 Asts: Ukić 8		Pts: Čović 21; Rebs: Ojo 8 Asts: Čović 6

Topolica Sport Hall, Bar
Referees: Dragan Kralj, Milan Adamović, Dragan Porobić

=== Igokea v Mega Bemax ===
20 September 2017
16:45 (CEST)

Boxscore

Igokea (Bosnia and Herzegovina)	72–83	(Serbia) Mega Bemax
Scoring by quarter: 21–23, 16–18, 14–25, 21–17
Pts: Washington, Šibalić 18; Rebs: Washington 7 Asts: Washington 5		Pts: Ennis 23; Rebs: Fundić 14; Asts: Rebić 7

Topolica Sport Hall, Bar
Referees: Matej Spendl, Krunoslav Peić, Radoš Savović

=== Budućnost VOLI v Cibona ===
20 September 2017
19:00 (CEST)

Boxscore

Budućnost VOLI (Montenegro)	96–90	(Croatia) Cibona
Scoring by quarter: 27–21, 20–28, 20–23, 29–18
Pts: Ivanović 19; Rebs: Barović 12; Asts: Gordić 8		Pts: Novačić 20; Rebs: Ljubičić 8 Asts: Hall 8

Topolica Sport Hall, Bar
Referees: Miloš Koljenšić, Branislav Mrdak, Saša Babić

=== Mornar v Partizan NIS ===
20 September 2017
21:15 (CEST)

Boxscore

Mornar (Montenegro)	91–77	(Serbia) Partizan NIS
Scoring by quarter: 26–24, 16–23, 27–17, 22–13
Pts: Needham 22; Rebs: Shepherd 10; Asts: Needham, Raley-Ross 4		Pts: Marinković 14; Rebs: Pecarski 7 Asts: Williams-Goss, Čakarević 2

Topolica Sport Hall, Bar
Referees: Igor Dragojević, Denis Hadžić, Boro Antovski

== 5th–8th place semifinals ==
=== FMP v Igokea ===
21 September 2017
18:15 (CEST)

Boxscore

FMP (Serbia)	71–80	(Bosnia and Herzegovina) Igokea
Scoring by quarter: 13–28, 15–14, 19–15, 24–23
Pts: Čović 18; Rebs: Rakićević 9 Asts: Čović 10		Pts: Radivojević 21; Rebs: Ljubičić, Jevtović 5 Asts: Washington 5

Topolica Sport Hall, Bar

=== Cibona v Partizan NIS ===
21 September 2017
20:30 (CEST)

Boxscore

Cibona (Croatia)	76–83	(Serbia) Partizan NIS
Scoring by quarter: 17–18, 23–23, 17–18, 19–24
Pts: Melvin 25; Rebs: Melvin 17; Asts: Hall 7		Pts: Williams-Goss 30; Rebs: Čakarević 12; Asts: three players 4

Topolica Sport Hall, Bar

== Semifinals ==
=== Cedevita v Mega Bemax ===
22 September 2017
18:45 (CEST)

Boxscore

Cedevita (Croatia)	99–96	(Serbia) Mega Bemax
Scoring by quarter: 25–25, 34–20, 24–22, 16–29
Pts: Nichols 17; Rebs: Krušlin 6 Asts: Ukić 4		Pts: Fundić 18; Rebs: Lazić 13; Asts: Rebić 9

Topolica Sport Hall, Bar

=== Budućnost VOLI v Mornar ===
22 September 2017
21:00 (CEST)

Boxscore

Budućnost VOLI (Montenegro)	82–65	(Montenegro) Mornar
Scoring by quarter: 27–10, 19–16, 17–21, 19–18
Pts: Gibson 18; Rebs: not available Asts: not available		Pts: Vranješ 9 Rebs: not available Asts: not available

Topolica Sport Hall, Bar

== Seventh place game ==
22 September 2017
16:30 (CEST)

Boxscore

FMP (Serbia)	91–75	(Croatia) Cibona
Scoring by quarter: 22–14, 34–20, 11–16, 24–25
Pts: Jeremić 18; Rebs: Bursać 8 Asts: Uskoković 7		Pts: Blinovac 23; Rebs: Melvin 6 Asts: Hall 5

Topolica Sport Hall, Bar

== Fifth place game ==
23 September 2017
16:30 (CEST)

Boxscore

Igokea (Bosnia and Herzegovina)	74–64	(Serbia) Partizan NIS
Scoring by quarter: 18–15, 12–19, 16–15, 28–15
Pts: Glogovac 20; Rebs: Milošević 8 Asts: three players 3		Pts: Williams-Goss 18; Rebs: Čakarević, Pecarski 6 Asts: Williams-Goss 8

Topolica Sport Hall, Bar

== Third place game ==
23 September 2017
18:45 (CEST)

DNP

Mega Bemax (Serbia)	20–0	(Montenegro) Mornar

Topolica Sport Hall, Bar

== Final ==
23 September 2017
21:00 (CEST)

Boxscore

Cedevita (Croatia)	78–69	(Montenegro) Budućnost VOLI
Scoring by quarter: 21–2, 13–33, 22–16, 22–18
Pts: Stipanović 20; Rebs: Stipanović 9 Asts: Cherry 4		Pts: Ivanović 20; Rebs: Barović 6 Asts: Popović 4

Topolica Sport Hall, Bar

Cedevita	Budućnost

Starters:			Pts	Reb	Ast
PG	22	(United States) Will Cherry	7	6	4
SG	2	(Croatia) Filip Krušlin	2	3	2
SF	13	(Bosnia and Herzegovina) Džanan Musa	10	4	2
F	8	(United States) Demetris Nichols	19	2	1
C	31	(Bosnia and Herzegovina) Andrija Stipanović	20	9	3
Reserves:					
PG	1	(Croatia) Roko Ukić	DNP		
SG	3	(Croatia) Toni Perković	0	0	0
PG	6	(Croatia) Toni Katić	2	1	3
F	7	(Croatia) Darko Bajo	0	2	0
PF	41	(Croatia) Filip Tončinić	0	3	0
SG	55	(United States) Kevin Murphy	18	5	0
Head coach:
(Slovenia) Jure Zdovc

2017 ABA League Supercup Champions

Cedevita
1st title
MVP
(Bosnia and Herzegovina) Andrija Stipanović (Cedevita)

Starters:			Pts	Reb	Ast
PG	10	(Bosnia and Herzegovina) Nemanja Gordić	12	5	2
G	22	(United States) Kyle Gibson	11	4	0
F	9	(Montenegro) Milić Starovlah	0	0	1
PF	34	(Montenegro) Danilo Nikolić	0	4	0
C	19	(Montenegro) Zoran Nikolić	2	2	0
Reserves:					
PG	2	(Montenegro) Nikola Ivanović	20	0	3
F/C	6	(Montenegro) Filip Barović	16	6	1
F/C	11	(Montenegro) Vasilije Baćović	DNP		
F	12	(Montenegro) Bogdan Bojić	DNP		
F	13	(Montenegro) Aleksa Ilić	4	5	0
PG	30	(Montenegro) Petar Popović	4	0	4
Head coach:
(Serbia) Aleksandar Džikić

== Final ranking ==
Rank	Team
Gold medal	(Croatia) Cedevita
Silver medal	(Montenegro) Budućnost VOLI
Bronze medal	(Serbia) Mega Bemax
4	(Montenegro) Mornar
5	(Bosnia and Herzegovina) Igokea
6	(Serbia) Partizan NIS
7	(Serbia) FMP
8	(Croatia) Cibona

== See also ==
- 2017–18 ABA League

Teams

- 2017–18 KK Crvena zvezda season
- 2017–18 KK Partizan season
