= Demetris Nichols =

American basketball player (born 1984)

Personal information
- Born: September 4, 1984 (age 41) Boston, Massachusetts, U.S.
- Listed height: 6 ft 8 in (2.03 m)
- Listed weight: 211 lb (96 kg)

Career information
- High school: St. Andrew's School (Barrington, Rhode Island)
- College: Syracuse (2003–2007)
- NBA draft: 2007: 2nd round, 53rd overall pick
- Drafted by: Portland Trail Blazers
- Playing career: 2007–2019
- Position: Small forward / power forward
- Number: 35

Career history
- 2007: Cleveland Cavaliers
- 2007–2008: Chicago Bulls
- 2007–2008: →Iowa Energy
- 2009: New York Knicks
- 2009: Iowa Energy
- 2009–2010: BCM Gravelines
- 2010–2011: JA Vichy
- 2011: Cholet Basket
- 2012: Metros de Santiago
- 2012–2013: Sioux Falls Skyforce
- 2013: Capitanes de Arecibo
- 2013–2014: Krasnye Krylia
- 2014–2016: CSKA Moscow
- 2016–2017: Panathinaikos
- 2017–2018: Cedevita Zagreb
- 2018–2019: Sidigas Avellino

Career highlights
- EuroLeague champion (2016); VTB United League champion (2015); Greek League champion (2017); Croatian League champion (2018); Greek Cup winner (2017); Croatian Cup winner (2018); ABA League Supercup winner (2017); NBA Development League All-Star (2013); All-NBA D-League First Team (2013); First-team All-Big East (2007); AP Honorable mention All-American (2007); Third-team Parade All-American (2003)
- Stats at NBA.com
- Stats at Basketball Reference

Demetris Nichols (born September 4, 1984) is an American former professional basketball player. He can play at both the small forward and power forward positions. Nichols played college basketball with the Syracuse Orange men's basketball team, and has been a member of the Cleveland Cavaliers, Chicago Bulls, and New York Knicks of the National Basketball Association (NBA).

== High school career ==
Nichols was coached by Mike Hart at St. Andrew's High School, where he helped his club to a 28–8 record and won the New England Prep School Athletic Conference title, tallying 15 points and 13 rebounds in the championship game against Lawrence Academy. His senior year, he averaged 18.6 points and 8.9 rebounds a game.

He was a three-time Street & Smith's Magazine Honorable Mention All-American, a 2003 third-team Parade All-American, the 2003 Rhode Island Gatorade Player of the Year, and the EA Sports Roundball Game All-American. He was rated 50th overall and 14th among small forwards by ESPN.com. He was successfully recruited by Syracuse University.

== College career ==
Nichols appeared in 26 games for the Orange during his freshman year, starting 15 of them. His best performance of the season was a seven-rebound and team-leading 17-point performance against Providence. He also scored 10 points against BYU and nine points against Maryland in the NCAA Tournament, in which Syracuse advanced to the Sweet 16. In his sophomore year, Nichols would start the first eight games of the season before he was forced out of the lineup with a back injury. He would play in 27 games that season, averaging 3.9 points and 2.1 rebounds per game.

Nichols posted the sixth-best scoring average improvement in Syracuse history, going from 3.9 points per game as a sophomore to 13.3 points per game in 2005–06 in his junior year. He ranked second on the team in scoring and third in rebounding (5.8 rebounds per game). Nichols scored a season-high 28 points against Connecticut and averaged 13.0 points and 4.8 rebounds in the Big East Tournament.

Nichols' senior season proved to be his best one at Syracuse, as he was a unanimous selection for the All-Big East First Team. He was also a NABC and USBWA All-District First Team selection after leading the Big East in scoring (18.9 points per game) and finished third in conference play (17.9 points per game). He also set a Syracuse record in Big East games with a career-high 37 points, including seven three-pointers, to go along with 10 rebounds against St. John's.

In March 2007, Nichols was elected to participate in the 19th Annual State Farm College Three-Point Championship. He finished second to Aaron Brooks.

Nichols finished his Syracuse career tied for 28th in career scoring (1,344), third in three-point goals (205), fourth in three-point field goals attempted (573) and 10th in three-point field goal percentage (.358).

== Professional career ==
Nichols was taken in the second round (53rd overall) by the Portland Trail Blazers in the 2007 NBA draft, but immediately traded to the New York Knicks in exchange for the Knicks' 2008 second round draft choice.

Nichols participated in the July 2007 Las Vegas Summer League with the Knicks and averaged 15.6 points on 53 percent shooting, including 23 points in the final game against the Denver Nuggets. He was second on the team in scoring as the Knicks went a perfect 5–0.

Following the summer league, Nichols fired his agent after the Knicks were attempting to work out a deal to send Nichols to Europe for the 2007–08 season. Originally, the Knicks had wanted Nichols to play in Italy because they had 17 contracts and only 15 roster spots. When Nichols heard of the arrangement, he fired then-agent Bill Duffy in favor of Bill Neff and refused the Knicks' request. On October 1, Nichols was signed to the Knicks roster along with four other newcomers. However, he was subsequently released by the Knicks on October 25, as the team needed to cut down its roster to 15 players. Then on October 29, he was signed by the Cleveland Cavaliers to fill the 15th spot on their opening day roster. Nichols sat on the bench for the first month of his time with the Cavaliers, but saw his first action on November 28, scoring 2 points in 8 minutes of playing time. On December 5, 2007, Nichols was waived to clear roster space after the Cavs re-signed Anderson Varejão to end a contract dispute. He was subsequently claimed by the Chicago Bulls and assigned to the Iowa Energy of the D-League. After averaging 19.3 points per game in 14 appearances in the D-League, he was recalled to Chicago. He played his first game with the Bulls on January 23, 2008.

He began the 2008–09 season with the Bulls, receiving marginal minutes in two early-season games. However, he was waived November 17. He rejoined the Energy in January 2009, scoring 11 points in his first game back in Des Moines.

On March 6, 2009, Nichols signed a 10-day contract with the New York Knicks.

On December 1, 2009, Nichols signed with the French team BCM Gravelines.

In the summer of 2010, Nichols played for the Portland Trail Blazers in the NBA Summer League.

In November 2010, he signed a contract with French club JA Vichy, until the end of the season.

In August 2012, Nichols played for the Metros de Santiago, of the Dominican Republic. Later that year, Nichols joined the Sioux Falls Skyforce of the NBA D-League.

On February 4, 2013, Nichols was named to the Prospects All-Star roster for the 2013 NBA D-League All-Star Game.

In September 2013, he signed a contract with the Russian team Krasnye Krylia.

On August 18, 2014, Nichols signed a two-week tryout contract with CSKA Moscow. Nichols eventually extended his contract until the end of 2014–15 season. CSKA Moscow finished the season by winning the VTB United League, after eliminating Khimki with a 3–0 series sweep in the league's final playoff series.

On July 24, 2015, he re-signed with CSKA for one more season. He parted ways with the team on June 18, 2016.

On September 2, 2016, Nichols signed with Greek club Panathinaikos for the 2016–17 season.

On July 30, 2017, Nichols signed with Croatian club Cedevita Zagreb for the 2017–18 season.

On August 5, 2018, Nichols signed a deal with the Italian club Sidigas Avellino for the 2018–19 LBA season.

== International career ==
Nichols was a member of the 2002 USA Development Festival East Team that finished 3-2 and earned the silver medal. He averaged 14.8 points and 5.6 rebounds in five games.

Nichols was invited to try out for the 2004 USA Basketball World Championship For Young Men's Qualifying Team. He participated in the first round of July workouts, but did not make the team.

== Career statistics ==
Legend
GP	Games played	GS	Games started	MPG	Minutes per game
FG%	Field-goal percentage	3P%	3-point field-goal percentage	FT%	Free-throw percentage
RPG	Rebounds per game	APG	Assists per game	SPG	Steals per game
BPG	Blocks per game	PPG	Points per game	PIR	Performance index rating
**Bold**	Career high

=== NBA ===
==== Regular season ====
Year	Team	GP	GS	MPG	FG%	3P%	FT%	RPG	APG	SPG	BPG	PPG
2007–08	Cleveland	3	0	**4.7**	.125	.000	.000	.3	.0	.0	.0	.7
2007–08	Chicago	**11**	0	2.7	.333	**.300**	.000	.4	.1	.0	.3	1.2
2008–09	Chicago	2	0	2.5	.250	.000	.000	.0	**.5**	.0	.0	1.0
2008–09	New York	2	0	4.5	**.400**	.000	**.500**	**1.0**	**.5**	.0	**.5**	**2.5**
Career		18	0	3.2	.281	.200	.500	.4	.1	.0	.2	1.2

=== EuroLeague ===
†	Denotes season in which Nichols won the EuroLeague
*	Led the league

Year	Team	GP	GS	MPG	FG%	3P%	FT%	RPG	APG	SPG	BPG	PPG	PIR
2014–15	CSKA Moscow	**27**	1	**12.3**	**.556**	**.575***	.833	3.2	.3	**.6**	.4	**4.6**	**4.5**
2015–16†	CSKA Moscow	23	3	12.1	.479	.366	.667	1.4	**.7**	.5	**.5**	4.0	3.7
2016–17	Panathinaikos	**32**	**19**	15.2	.453	.354	**.875**	**2.3**	.3	.3	.3	3.8	3.6
Career		82	23	13.4	.474	.426	.800	2.0	.4	.5	.4	4.1	3.9

=== Domestic leagues ===
Season	Team	League	GP	MPG	FG%	3P%	FT%	RPG	APG	SPG	BPG	PPG
2007–08	Iowa Energy	D-League	14	37.4	.450	.333	.778	4.2	2.8	1.1	1.0	19.3
2008–09	Iowa Energy	D-League	18	39.2	.475	.417	.850	5.4	3.1	1.2	1.2	22.1
2009–10	BCM Gravelines	LNB Pro A	27	16.6	.415	.357	.774	2.1	.6	.4	.3	6.7
2010–11	JA Vichy	LNB Pro A	21	34.6	.498	.342	.833	5.4	2.2	1.5	.9	18.2
2011–12	Cholet Basket	LNB Pro A	8	25.9	.500	.500	.889	3.5	1.5	1.0	1.0	14.9
2012	Metros de Santiago	Dominican LNB	8	27.8	.580	.267	.733	3.8	1.1	1.6	.9	11.6
2012–13	Sioux Falls Skyforce	D-League	49	36.0	.510	.362	.852	5.4	2.3	1.4	.8	18.7
2013	Capitanes de Arecibo	BSN	15	30.9	.567	.344	.822	3.9	2.6	1.1	.9	14.2
2013–14	Krasnye Krylya Samara Region	VTB United League	22	30.5	.525	.421	.824	3.7	1.4	1.2	1.1	14.0
2014–15	CSKA Moscow	VTB United League	33	14.1	.433	.483	.735	2.2	.5	.5	.4	5.1
