= Darko Bajo =

Croatian basketball player

No. 14 – Split
- Position: Forward
- League: Premijer liga

Personal information
- Born: 14 March 1999 (age 27) Travnik, Bosnia and Herzegovina
- Listed height: 6 ft 9 in (2.06 m)
- Listed weight: 227 lb (103 kg)

Career information
- NBA draft: 2021: undrafted
- Playing career: 2016–present

Career history
- 2016–2019: Cedevita
- 2019–2022: Split
- 2022–2023: Karlsruhe Lions
- 2023–2024: BC Vienna
- 2024–2025: Budapest Honvéd
- 2025–2026: BC Vienna
- 2026–present: Split

Career highlights
- Croatian League champion (2018); 2× Croatian Cup winner (2018, 2019); ABA League Supercup winner (2017)
Medals
Men's basketball
Representing Croatia
FIBA Europe U18 Championship B
Gold medal – first place	2017 Estonia	National U-18 Team

Darko Bajo (born March 14, 1999) is a Croatian professional basketball player for Split of the Premijer liga. He was born in Bosnia and Herzegovina, but has represented Croatia in international youth tournaments.

== Early life ==
Bajo was born in Travnik, Bosnia and Herzegovina, and began playing basketball at a young age. He moved to Croatia in his teenage years, joining youth teams known for producing top-tier regional talent.

== Professional career ==
=== Cedevita (2016–2019) ===
On October 23, 2015, Bajo signed his first professional contract with Cedevita. He initially played for their youth and development teams, then began appearing for the senior team in the Croatian League and ABA League. During his tenure, Cedevita won the Croatian League in 2018 and two Croatian Cups (2018, 2019), with Bajo playing a role off the bench.

=== KK Split (2019–2022) ===
In 2019, Bajo moved to KK Split seeking more playing time and responsibilities. Over three seasons, he grew into a core player. In the 2020–21 season, he averaged 8.6 points, 4.2 rebounds, and 1.1 assists per game in the Croatian League. He also featured prominently in the ABA League.

=== PS Karlsruhe Lions (2022–2023) ===
In the summer of 2022, Bajo signed with the German ProA team PS Karlsruhe Lions, marking his first stint outside of the Balkan region. Despite injury setbacks, he averaged 7.8 points and 3.9 rebounds per game. His performance was noted for defensive versatility and strong effort plays.

=== BC Vienna (2025–present) ===
On August 26, 2025, he signed with GGMT Vienna of the Austrian Basketball Superliga.

== National team ==
Bajo represented Croatia at youth levels and was part of the national U-18 team that won gold at the 2017 FIBA U18 European Championship Division B in Estonia. He was a starter and contributed as a rebounder and interior defender.

== Playing style ==
Bajo is known for his defensive presence and energy. He plays primarily as a power forward but can switch to center in small-ball lineups. His strengths include:

- Solid rebounding on both ends
- Ability to switch defensively onto guards
- Decent outside shooting for a forward
- Off-ball cutting and screen setting

He has been described as a "glue guy"—providing intangibles and team-first play rather than headline stats.

== Personal life ==
He holds dual citizenship in Croatia and Bosnia and Herzegovina. Bajo is fluent in Croatian and English and is known for his quiet, hardworking demeanor.
