= Trstje shooting =

2008 mass shooting in Bosnia and Herzegovina

- Location: Trstje and Lipnica Gornja, Tuzla, Tuzla Canton, Federation of Bosnia and Herzegovina, Bosnia and Herzegovina
- Date: 29 May 2008; 18 years ago
- Target: Relatives and neighbors
- Attack type: Mass shooting
- Weapon: CZ 7.62 Pistol
- Deaths: 6
- Injuries: 1
- Perpetrator: Tomislav Petrović
- Convictions: 40-year imprisonment (overturned)

The Trstje shooting occurred on 29 May 2008 in Trstje and Lipnica Gornja, Tuzla, Bosnia and Herzegovina. 45-year-old Tomislav Petrović shot dead six of his relatives and neighbors and wounded another.

== Background ==
The day before the shooting, Tomislav Petrović's wife called her sister and complained about threats from her husband. She complained of threats, that her husband called her a whore and beat her. She also asked her sister to call the police. Instead, she called an ambulance, said that her sister's husband had previously been treated in a mental hospital, and asked that he be reassured. The ambulance advised her to call the police, which she did not do. Also on the eve of the shooting, Tomislav Petrović threatened his wife over the phone. Half an hour before the shooting, a quarrel broke out between the couple, after which his wife ran away from home and hid in the house of her relatives.

== Shooting ==
At around 6 a.m. on 29 May 2008, in Trstje, Tomislav Petrović started firing from a pistol at a bus stop. He fired at the bus from the outside, then got into it and continued firing. In the bus, he killed three passengers and wounded the driver in the chest and arm. Leaving the bus, he walked down the street to a nearby house where he killed one person. And then killed two more people on the doorstep of this house. He then got into a car and followed the locals who were trying to take the injured driver to the hospital. He rammed them with his car but they managed to escape from him. Then he went to Gornja Lipnica. There he tried to set fire to his cousin's car, and shot at parked cars. Police arrested him after he ran out of ammunition. The shooting lasted 25 minutes.

== Perpetrator ==
Tomislav Petrović was a member of the Army of the Republic of Bosnia and Herzegovina in the reserve police in 1992 and 1993. During the war he was in Croatia. Everyone in the neighborhood knew that he was prone to all sorts of incidents and had mental problems. Before the war he worked as an electrician in a mine. In recent years, he has lived and worked as an electrician in Croatia and occasionally returned to his native village. He had two children. He suspected his wife of adultery and quarreled with her over it. He also accused his wife's sister of quarreling. On the eve of the shooting, he said he would like to attack as the protagonist of Schwarzenegger's film. Although he was mentally ill and was being treated in a mental hospital before the shooting, he was licensed to own a pistol. Tomislav Petrović was initially sentenced to 40 years in prison, but was later overturned. He was recognized as a paranoid schizophrenic and was sent to a mental hospital for treatment.
