= Ivan Meheš =

Croatian basketball player and coach

Free agent
- Title: Head coach

Personal information
- Born: 1965 (age 60–61) Zagreb, SR Croatia, SFR Yugoslavia

Career information
- Playing career: 1975–2000
- Positions: Forward; Power forward Center
- Number: 7, 14
- Coaching career: 2000–present

Career history

Playing
- 1975–1984: Zapruđe
- 1984–1988: Monting
- 1988–1990: Novi Zagreb
- 1990–1992: Industromontaža Zagreb
- 1992–1995: Zrinjevac
- 1995–1999: Benston Zagreb
- 1999–2000: Dona

Coaching
- 2000–2002: Dona
- 2002–2003: Hermes Analitica
- 2003–2006: Zagreb
- 2007–2008: Borik-Puntamika
- 2008–2009: Novi Zagreb
- 2009: Cedevita (interim)
- 2014–2015: Podsused

Ivan Meheš (born 1965 in Zagreb) is a Croatian professional basketball coach and former player.

He started playing 1975 in basketball club KK Zapruđe. Professional basketball player career ended in 2000 when he started coaching in basketball club KK Dona Dubrava.

== Playing career ==
=== Schools ===
Meheš attended Karl Marx Elementary School in Zagreb, Croatia, where he anchored his athletic career by playing basketball. School was competing in Yugoslavian Elementary School Championship, Croatian Elementary School Championship and Radivoj Korać Cup. In 1979 they won first place in Croatian Elementary School Championship and first place in Radivoj Korać cup in Vogošća.

In Catering and Hospitality Education Center High School Zagreb, Croatia, he continued to play basketball. In 1982 he won Croatian High School Championship.

In 2005 Meheš graduated Physical Education major, Senior Basketball Coach from University of Zagreb, Faculty of Kinesiology.

=== National team ===
In 1980 he was team captain in Croatian cadet national team where he won third place in the Yugoslavian Republics Tournament.

In 1982 Meheš was drafted in Yugoslavian national team.

=== Teams ===
==== Zapruđe ====
For basketball team KK Zapruđe Meheš played from 1975 to 1984. In 1980 team entered Croatian Unified League and won third place in Croatian Cadet Championship.

==== Zrinjevac ====
Next team he played was KK Monting, from 1984 to 1988, where he played Yugoslavian B1 League.

He returned to team, this time named KK Industromontaža, in 1990 where he played Croatian A1 League.

Team changed name to KK Zrinjevac in 1992. Meheš as a team captain played in Croatian A1 League, Croatian Cup and Radivoj Korać Cup. In 1994 he played in Croatian Championship and Croatian Cup finals. For Christmas in 1993 was organised Christmas Basketball Tournament (first of its kind in Croatia). Meheš won MVP award.

==== Zagreb ====
For two years playing for basketball team OKK Novi Zagreb, team managed to do unthinkable at the time and won an entrance to First Yugoslavian League from Yugoslavian B1 League.

==== Dubrava ====
In 1999 Meheš started playing for basketball team KK Benston (later KK Dona Dubrava). Team played Croatian A1 League and Radivoj Korać Cup.

In year 2000 Meheš retired and switch role of the player to the role of the assistant coach.
