= Ante Mašić =

Bosnian-Herzegovinian basketball player

No. 8 – Gorica
- Position: Small forward
- League: Croatian League

Personal information
- Born: October 18, 1985 (age 41) Duvno, SR Bosnia and Herzegovina, SFR Yugoslavia
- Listed height: 6 ft 7 in (2.01 m)
- Listed weight: 220 lb (100 kg)

Career information
- NBA draft: 2007: undrafted
- Playing career: 2002–present

Career history
- 2002–2003: Brotnjo
- 2003–2004: Posušje
- 2004–2007: Zrinjski Mostar
- 2007–2009: Zlatorog Laško
- 2009–2012: Zagreb
- 2012: Cibona
- 2013: Cedevita
- 2013: Zagreb
- 2013–2014: Ikaros Kallitheas
- 2014: Jolly JBŠ
- 2014–2015: Kaštela Ribola
- 2015: Feni Industries
- 2015–present: Gorica

Career highlights
- Croatian champion (2011); 2× Croatian Cup winner (2010, 2011)

Ante Mašić (born October 18, 1985) is a Bosnian-Herzegovinian professional basketball player, who plays for KK Gorica of the Croatian League. He was a member of the Bosnia and Herzegovina national basketball team.

== Bosnian-Herzegovinian national team ==
Mašić played for the Bosnia and Herzegovina national basketball team at the FIBA EuroBasket 2013 where he averaged 1.0 points, 1.3 rebounds and 0.0 assists per game.
