= 2020–21 Victoria Libertas Pesaro season =

Italian basketball season

Victoria Libertas Pesaro
2020-21 season
- President: Ario Costa
- Head coach: Jasmin Repeša
- Arena: Adriatic Arena
- LBA: 13th of 15
- Italian Cup: Runner-up
- Supercup: Group stage (3rd of 4)

The 2020–21 season is Victoria Libertas Pesaro's 75th in existence and the club's 13th consecutive season in the top tier Italian basketball.

== Overview ==
After the disastrous 2019-20 season where they ended at the last place before the official interruption of the championship due to the coronavirus pandemic, they had a serious risk of being relegated to the Serie A2. But, at the last moment, the management decided to keep the team in the Serie A.

== Kit ==
Supplier: Erreà / Sponsor: Prosciutto Carpegna DOP

Home	Away	Third kit

== Players ==
=== Current roster ===
Carpegna Prosciutto Pesaro roster
Players
Coaches

Pos.	No.	Nat.	Name	Ht.	Wt.	Age
G/F	3	(Estonia)	Drell, Henri	2.04 m (6 ft 8 in)	85 kg (187 lb)	26 – 25 April 2000
PG	4	(United States)	Massenat, Frantz	1.92 m (6 ft 4 in)	87 kg (192 lb)	34 – 17 January 1992
PG	5	(Italy)	Filloy, Ariel	1.90 m (6 ft 3 in)	85 kg (187 lb)	39 – 11 March 1987
PG	7	(Italy)	Calbini, Lorenzo	1.91 m (6 ft 3 in)	74 kg (163 lb)	23 – 19 June 2003
C	8	(United States)	Cain, Tyler	2.05 m (6 ft 9 in)	107 kg (236 lb)	38 – 30 June 1988
PG	12	(United States)	Robinson, Justin	1.73 m (5 ft 8 in)	79 kg (174 lb)	31 – 12 April 1995
PG	15	(Italy)	Tambone, Matteo	1.92 m (6 ft 4 in)	87 kg (192 lb)	32 – 14 May 1994
SF	21	(Cameroon)	Eboua, Paul	2.03 m (6 ft 8 in)	97 kg (214 lb)	26 – 15 February 2000
PF	33	(Italy)	Serpilli, Michele	2.00 m (6 ft 7 in)	90 kg (198 lb)	27 – 12 March 1999
PF	35	(Hungary)	Filipovity, Márkó	2.03 m (6 ft 8 in)	98 kg (216 lb)	30 – 30 July 1996
PF	41	(Italy)	Zanotti, Simone	2.08 m (6 ft 10 in)	91 kg (201 lb)	33 – 31 December 1992
G/F	82	(Argentina)	Delfino, Carlos (C)	1.98 m (6 ft 6 in)	104 kg (229 lb)	44 – 29 August 1982

Head coach

- (Croatia) Jasmin Repeša

Assistant coach(es)

- (Italy) Paolo Calbini
- (Italy) Luca Pentucci

Legend

- (C) Team captain
- Injured

- Roster
Updated: 10 May 2021

Note: Flags indicate national team eligibility at FIBA-sanctioned events. Players may hold other non-FIBA nationalities not displayed.

=== Depth chart ===
Pos.	Starting 5	Bench 1	Bench 2
C	Tyler Cain	Simone Zanotti
PF	Márkó Filipovity	Paul Eboua	Michele Serpilli
SF	Henri Drell	Carlos Delfino
SG	Frantz Massenat	Matteo Tambone
PG	Justin Robinson	Ariel Filloy	Lorenzo Calbini

(colours: Italian or homegrown players; foreign players; young players)

=== Squad changes ===
==== In ====
No.	Pos.	Nat.	Name	Age	Moving from		Type	Ends	Transfer fee	Date	Source
82	G/F	(Argentina) (Italy)	Carlos Delfino	37	Free agent		1 year	June 2021	Free	7 July 2020	
4	PG	(United States)	Frantz Massenat	28	MoraBanc Andorra	(Spain)	1 year	June 2021	Free	21 July 2020	
15	PG	(Italy)	Matteo Tambone	26	Pallacanestro Varese	(Italy)	1 year	June 2021	Free	22 July 2020	
35	PF	(Hungary)	Márkó Filipovity	23	Falco Kosárlabda	(Hungary)	1 year	June 2021	Free	25 July 2020	
8	C	(United States)	Tyler Cain	32	Brescia Leonessa	(Italy)	1 year	June 2021	Undisclosed	31 July 2020	
12	PG	(United States)	Justin Robinson	25	Élan Chalon	(France)	1 year	June 2021	Free	2 August 2020	
5	PG	(Italy) (Argentina)	Ariel Filloy	33	Reyer Venezia	(Italy)	1 year	June 2021	Free	10 August 2020	
22	G	(United States)	Gerald Robinson	31	Virtus Roma	(Italy)	7 weeks	15 February 2021	Free	29 December 2020	
21	SF	(Cameroon) (Italy)	Paul Eboua	21	Long Island Nets	(United States)	End of the season	June 2021	USA	21 March 2021	

1. In players: Players who signed after the beginning of the season

==== Out ====
No.	Pos.	Nat.	Name	Age	Moving to		Type	Transfer fee	Date	Source
12	SF	(Cameroon) (Italy)	Paul Eboua	20	Stella Azzurra Roma	(Italy)	End of contract	Free	18 April 2020	
35	SF	(Italy)	Leonardo Totè	22	Fortitudo Bologna	(Italy)	End of contract	Free	8 June 2020	
8	G	(Serbia)	Vasilije Pušica	24	Dinamo Sassari	(Italy)	End of contract	Free	1 July 2020	
4	PG	(Italy)	Federico Mussini	24	Pallacanestro Trieste	(Italy)	End of contract	Free	1 July 2020	
11	SG	(Italy)	Federico Miaschi	20	Pallacanestro Biella	(Italy)	End of loan contract (to Venezia)	Free	1 July 2020	
22	G	(United States)	Gerald Robinson	32	JDA Dijon	(France)	End of contract	Free	15 February 2021	
24	C	(Italy)	Beniamino Basso	20	Kleb Basket Ferrara	(Italy)	Loan contract	Undisclosed	25 March 2021	

1. Out players: Players who left before the end of the season

==== Confirmed ====
No.	Pos.	Nat.	Name	Age	Moving from		Type	Ends	Transfer fee	Date	Source
41	C	(Italy)	Simone Zanotti	27	San Crispino Basket P.S. Elpidio	(Italy)	2 + 2 year	June 2022	Free	11 July 2018	
3	G/F	(Estonia)	Henri Drell	20	Baunach Young Pikes	(Germany)	3 years	June 2022	Free	19 July 2019	

==== From youth team ====
No.	Pos.	Nat.	Name	Age	Transfer fee	Date	Source
24	C	(Italy)	Beniamino Basso	19	Youth system	9 July 2020	
33	PF	(Italy)	Michele Serpilli	19	Youth system	September 2020	

==== Coach ====
Nat.	Name	Age.	Previous team		Type	Ends	Date	Replaces		Date	Type
(Croatia)	Jasmin Repeša	59	Budućnost	(Montenegro)	3 years	June 2023	23 June 2020	(Italy)	Giancarlo Sacco	1 July 2020	End of contract

== Competitions ==
=== Supercup ===
Pos	Team	Pld	W	L	PF	PA	PD	Qualification
1	Banco di Sardegna Sassari	6	4	2	563	484	+79	Advance to Final Four
2	Happy Casa Brindisi	6	4	2	528	470	+58	
3	Carpegna Prosciutto Pesaro	6	4	2	498	435	+63	
4	Virtus Roma	6	0	6	394	594	−200	

Source: LegaBasket Serie A
Rules for classification: All points scored in extra period(s) were not counted in the standings, nor for any tie-break situation.

=== Italian Cup ===
Pesaro qualified to the 2021 Italian Basketball Cup by ending the first half of the LBA season in the 6th position. They played the quarterfinal against the 3rd ranking Banco di Sardegna Sassari. They reached the final but lost against AX Armani Exchange Milano.

12 February 2021 Quarterfinals	Banco di Sardegna Sassari	110–115(OT)	Carpegna Prosciutto Pesaro	Assago (Milan)
20:45	Scoring by quarter: 26-24, 27-25, 23-21, 23-29, Overtime: 11-16
Rai Sport, Eurosport	Pts: Bendžius 22; Rebs: Spissu 10; Asts: Spissu 9 PIR: Spissu 34	Boxscore	Pts: Robinson 27; Rebs: Filipovity 13; Asts: Robinson 27; PIR: Drell	Arena: Mediolanum Forum; Referees: Michele Rossi, Lorenzo Baldini, Christian Borgo

14 February 2021 Semifinal	Happy Casa Brindisi	69–74	Carpegna Prosciutto Pesaro	Assago (Milan)
20:45	Scoring by quarter: 12-15, 16-26, 17-11, 24-22
Rai Sport, Eurosport	Pts: Thompson 19; Rebs: Udom, Willis 7 Asts: Thompson 7 PIR: Thompson 24	Boxscore	Pts: J. Robinson 23; Rebs: Cain 14; Asts: J. Robinson 4 PIR: J. Robinson 23	Arena: Mediolanum Forum; Referees: Carmelo Paternicò, Alessandro Martolini, Andrea Bongiorni

13 February 2021 Final	AX Armani Exchange Milano	87–59	Carpegna Prosciutto Pesaro	Assago (Milan)
18:15	Scoring by quarter: 21-15, 27-6, 26-15, 13-23
Rai Sport, Eurosport	Pts: Datome 15; Rebs: Hines 7 Asts: Rodríguez 8 PIR: Datome 26	Boxscore	Pts: Cain 15; Rebs: Cain 12; Asts: J. Robinson 4 PIR: Cain 21	Arena: Mediolanum Forum; Referees: Tolga Sahin, Roberto Begnis, Guido Giovannetti

=== Serie A ===
Pos	Team	Pld	W	L	PF	PA	PD	Qualification
11	UNAHOTELS Reggio Emilia	28	10	18	2122	2261	−139	
12	Fortitudo Lavoropiù Bologna	28	10	18	2179	2291	−112	
13	Carpegna Prosciutto Basket Pesaro	28	10	18	2271	2364	−93	
14	Openjobmetis Varese	28	10	18	2271	2433	−162	
15	Acqua S.Bernardo Cantù	28	9	19	2179	2313	−134	Relegation to Serie A2

Updated to match(es) played on 10 May 2021. Source: LBA

== See also ==
- 2020–21 LBA season
- 2021 Italian Basketball Cup
- 2020 Italian Basketball Supercup
