= Filip Krušlin =

Croatian basketball player

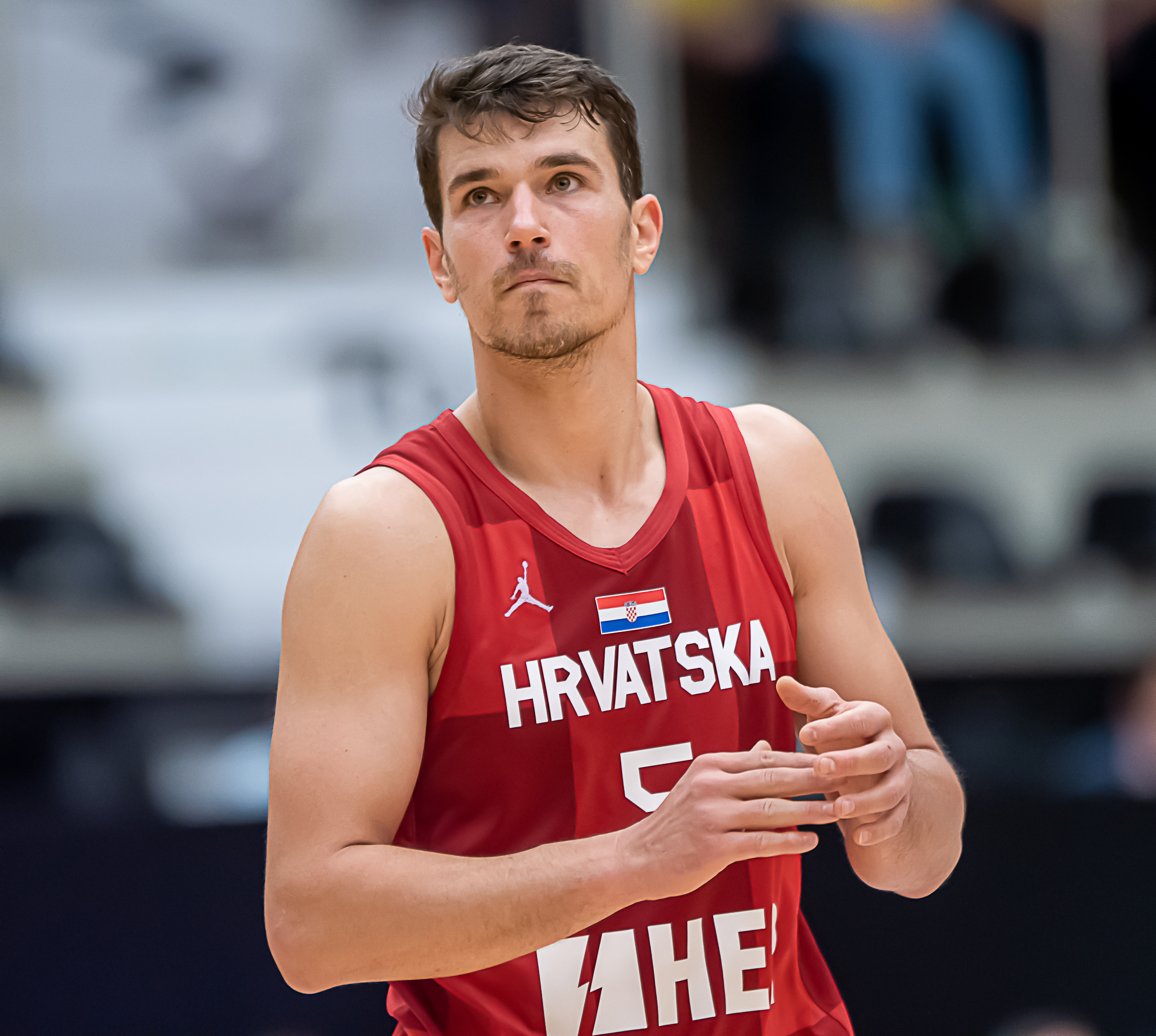
- Krušlin with Croatia in 2022

No. 44 – ESSM Le Portel
- Position: Shooting guard
- League: LNB Pro A

Personal information
- Born: March 18, 1989 (age 37) Zagreb, SR Croatia, SFR Yugoslavia
- Listed height: 1.98 m (6 ft 6 in)
- Listed weight: 94 kg (207 lb)

Career information
- NBA draft: 2011: undrafted
- Playing career: 2007–present

Career history
- 2007–2009: Cibona
- 2008–2009: → Dubrava
- 2010: Dubrovnik
- 2010–2011: Bosna
- 2011–2012: Zabok
- 2012–2013: Split
- 2014–2016: Cibona
- 2016–2019: Cedevita
- 2019–2020: Cedevita Olimpija
- 2020–2024: Dinamo Sassari
- 2024–2025: SIG Strasbourg
- 2025–present: ESSM Le Portel

Career highlights
- 2× Croatian League champion (2017, 2018); 3× Croatian Cup winner (2017–2019); ABA League Supercup winner (2017); Croatian Cup MVP (2019)

Filip Krušlin (born March 18, 1989) is a Croatian professional basketball player for ESSM Le Portel of the LNB Pro A. Standing at 1.98 m, he plays at the shooting guard position.

== Professional career ==
Filip Krušlin started his professional career in 2007–08 season, touted as a hot prospect for Cibona's future. He was recognised as a young talent while he played for younger selections in Zrinjevac and Rudeš. His debut for Cibona came against Široki in 2007–08 Adriatic League season. He played a total of 8 minutes and managed to gather up 4 points by getting a three pointer and one free throw scored. After that he played nine more games for Cibona in the Adriatic League. His season highlight was 7 points and 1 rebound in 10 minutes spent on court against Crvena zvezda.

At the start of 2008–09 season, Krušlin was offered a loan move to aid his development. Cibona has already signed five more guards that season which did not guarantee much play time for Krušiln. He was then loaned to another club from Zagreb, Dubrava. After suffering an injury and not playing in the Fall of 2009, he left Cibona and joined Dubrovnik. He spent a season at Bosna and Zabok before moving, in 2012, to Split.

On April 3, 2014, Krušlin signed a contract with Cibona.

On July 26, 2016, Krušlin signed a three-year deal with Cedevita.

On June 1, 2020, Krušlin signed a deal with Dinamo Sassari of the Italian League. Initially he was not renewed for the 2021–22 season, but then, eventually in November, 2021, he was called again from Sassari to play for one more season.

On June 11, 2024, he signed with SIG Strasbourg of the French LNB Pro A.

On June 28, 2025, he signed with ESSM Le Portel of the LNB Pro A.

== National team career ==
Krušlin played for the Croatia national U-18 team at the 2006 FIBA Europe Under-18 Championship and the 2007 FIBA Europe Under-18 Championship. He also played at the 2008 FIBA Europe Under-20 Championship.

He debuted for the Croatia national team at the 2016 FIBA World Olympic Qualifying Tournament in Turin. He was part of the team that took 5th place at the 2016 Summer Olympics but did not spend any time on court.

He later played at the 2017 EuroBasket, 2019 FIBA World Cup qualification and 2022 EuroBasket qualification matches.
