= Toni Katić =

Croatian basketball player

Free agent
- Position: Point guard

Personal information
- Born: July 9, 1992 (age 34) Makarska, Croatia
- Listed height: 1.88 m (6 ft 2 in)
- Listed weight: 84 kg (185 lb)

Career information
- NBA draft: 2014: undrafted
- Playing career: 2009–present

Career history
- 2009–2013: Split
- 2013–2015: Široki
- 2015–2019: Cedevita
- 2019–2020: Cibona
- 2020–2021: Dinamo Sassari
- 2021: U-BT Cluj-Napoca
- 2021–2022: JDA Dijon
- 2022: Dinamo București
- 2024–2025: Split

Career highlights
- 3× Croatian League champion (2016–2018); Bosnian Cup winner (2014); 5× Croatian Cup winner (2016–2019, 2025); ABA League Supercup winner (2017); Romanian Supercup champion (2021)

Toni Katić (born July 9, 1992) is a Croatian professional basketball player who last played for Split of the Croatian Basketball League and the ABA League.

Katić signed with Dinamo Sassari on November 7, 2020.

On August 19, 2021, he signed with U-BT Cluj-Napoca of the Romanian Liga Națională and FIBA Basketball Champions League. On September 29, he signed with JDA Dijon Basket of the LNB Pro A and the Basketball Champions League.
