= Desi Washington =

American basketball player (born 1992)

No. 7 – Final Spor Genclik
- Position: Point guard

Personal information
- Born: July 6, 1992 (age 34) Harrisburg, Pennsylvania, U.S.
- Listed height: 6 ft 2 in (1.88 m)
- Listed weight: 183 lb (83 kg)

Career information
- High school: Central Dauphin (Harrisburg, Pennsylvania)
- College: Delaware State (2010–2011); Saint Peter's (2012–2015)
- Playing career: 2016–present

Career history
- 2015–2016: Ohud Medina
- 2017: Igokea
- 2017–2018: Dynamic
- 2018: Student Mostar
- 2018–2019: GTK Gliwice
- 2019–2020: Anadolu Basket Ankara
- 2020: Hapoel Holon
- 2020–2021: 1881 Düzce
- 2021: Antalya Güneşi
- 2021–2022: Élan Chalon
- 2022–2023: Szedeák
- 2023: Apollon Patras
- 2023–2024: ESSM Le Portel
- 2024–2025: UB Chartres Métropole
- 2025: Lobos de Puebla
- 2025–2026: CJS Batroun
- 2026: Final Spor
- 2026–present: Club Central Jounieh

Desmond "Desi" Washington (born July 6, 1992) is an American professional basketball player for Final Gençlik ve Spor Kulübü. He played college basketball for the Delaware State Hornets and Saint Peter's Peacocks.

== Early life ==
During high school, Washington attended Central Dauphin High School, in Harrisburg, Pennsylvania.

== College career ==
After high school, Washington played college basketball for Delaware State, from 2010 to 2011 and for Saint Peter's, from 2012 to 2015.

== Professional career ==
On July 17, 2017, he signed with Igokea. He made his debut for the Igokea in their season opener on October 2, 2017, scoring 35 points, six rebounds, four assists and one steal against Petrol Olimpija. On November 24, 2017, he left Igokea and signed with Dynamic. He left Dynamic after the end of Adriatic season.

On May 13, 2020, Washington joined Hapoel Holon of the Israeli Premier League.

On July 24, 2020, Washington signed with 1881 Düzce Belediye. He joined Antalya Güneşi of the Turkish Basketball First League in 2021, and averaged 16.9 points, 5.9 assists, 5.0 rebounds, and 1.3 steals per game.

On November 26, 2021, Washington signed with Élan Chalon of the French LNB Pro B.

On August 14, 2023, Washington moved to Apollon Patras of the Greek Basket League. On December 29, 2023, he parted ways with the club. In 11 games, he averaged 13.5 points, 2.9 rebounds and 3.5 assists per contest.
