= Dražen Anzulović =

Croatian basketball coach and player (born 1967)

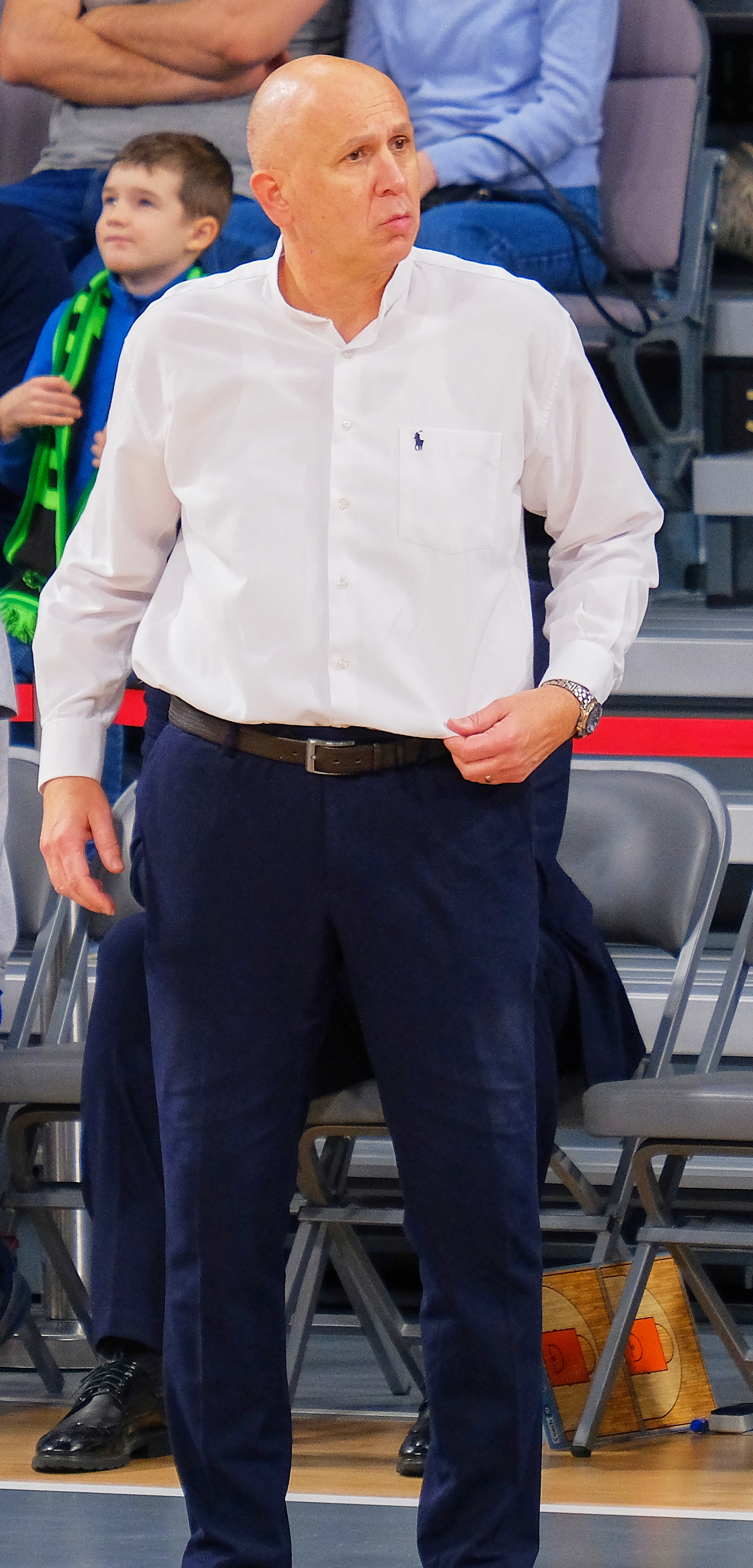

BC Samara
- Position: Head coach
- League: VTB United League

Personal information
- Born: 7 May 1967 (age 59) Zagreb, SR Croatia, SFR Yugoslavia
- Coaching career: 2001–present

Career history

Playing
- 1986–1990: Cibona
- 1990–1996: Zagreb
- 1996–1997: Vrijednosnice Osijek

Coaching
- 2001–2003: Zagreb
- 2003–2007: Cibona
- 2007–2008: Ural Great
- 2008–2009: Spirou Charleroi
- 2009–2010: BC Donetsk
- 2010: Lietuvos rytas
- 2010–2011: Cibona
- 2011–2012: Cedevita
- 2015–2017: MKS Dąbrowa Górnicza
- 2016–2017: Croatia (assistant)
- 2017–2018: Nanjing Monkey King
- 2018–2019: Croatia
- 2019–2023: BC Enisey
- 2023–present: BC Samara

Career highlights
- As player: EuroLeague champion (1986); As head coach: Stanković Cup winner (2018); 3× Croatian League champion (2004, 2006, 2007); 2× Pro Basketball League champion (2008, 2009); Belgian Cup winner (2009); Croatian Cup winner (2012); Belgian Supercup winner (2009); 4× Best coach in Croatia (2003, 2004, 2006, 2007)

Dražen Anzulović (born 7 May 1967) is a Croatian professional basketball coach and former player. He currently serves as a head coach for BC Samara of the VTB United League.

== Playing career ==
Anzulović spent most of his playing career in Cibona. He won the EuroLeague title as a player of Cibona in 1986 with Dražen Petrović on the team.

== Coaching career ==
Anzulović started his head coaching career after he got injured. As a head coach he has made great successes with Cibona, Cedevita, Spirou Charleroi and MKS Dąbrowa Górnicza.

On 28 November 2017, he was appointed head coach for Nanjing Monkey King. In April 2018, he left the Chinese club.

On 19 June 2019, he was named head coach for the VTB United League club BC Enisey.

== National team coaching career ==
Anzulović had served as an assistant coach for the Croatia national team twice, for the first time in period between 2006 and 2009, when Croatia managed to qualify for the 2008 Summer Olympics in Beijing for the first time after 1992, and then for the 2016 Summer Olympics in Rio de Janeiro, where the national team won the fifth place.

On 24 April 2018, he was appointed the new head coach for the senior Croatia national team, after Ivica Skelin parted ways with the Croatian Basketball Federation (HKS). On 2 May 2019, Anzulović was sacked and replaced by Veljko Mršić.

== Career achievements and awards ==
As a player:

- FIBA European Champions Cup:
  - 1985–86

As a coach:

- Stanković Cup:
  - 2018
- Croatian Basketball Cup:
  - 2011–12
- Belgian Basketball Supercup:
  - 2008–09
- Belgian Basketball Cup:
  - 2008–09
- Pro Basketball League:
    - 2008–09
    - 2007–08
- A-1 Liga Ožujsko:
    - 2003–04
    - 2005–06
    - 2006–07
