= Massimo Chessa =

Italian basketball player (born 1988)

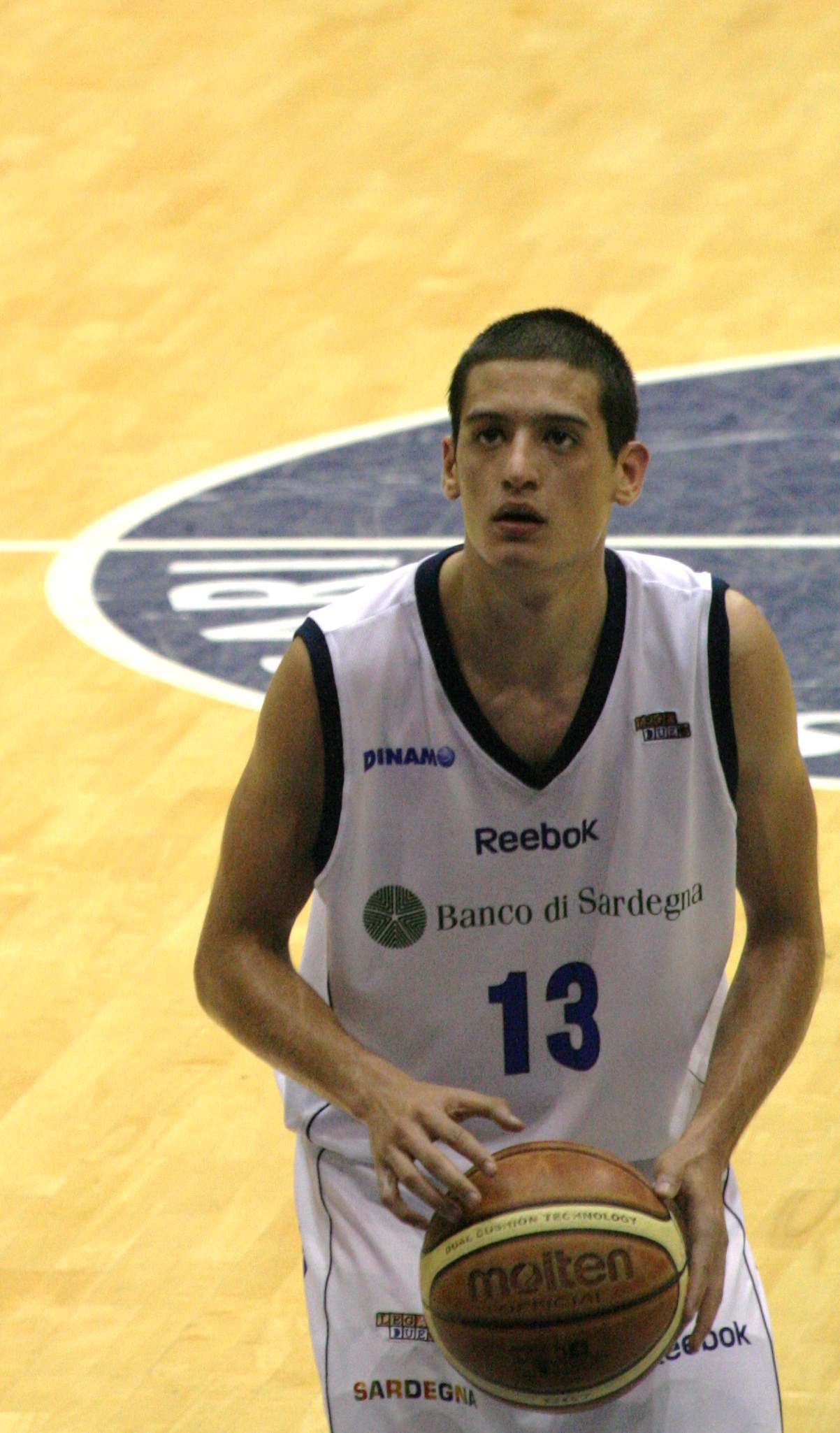
- Chessa with Dinamo Sassari

No. 10 – Dinamo Sassari
- Position: Point guard / shooting guard
- League: LBA

Personal information
- Born: April 30, 1988 (age 38) Sassari, Italy
- Listed height: 188 cm (6 ft 2 in)
- Listed weight: 80 kg (176 lb)

Career information
- Playing career: 2004–present

Career history
- 2004–2009: Dinamo Sassari
- 2009–2012: Biella
- 2012–2013: Scaligera Verona
- 2013–2014: Auxilium Torino
- 2014–2015: Dinamo Sassari
- 2015–2016: Trapani
- 2016–2019: Virtus Roma
- 2019-2020: GeVi Napoli
- 2021-present: Dinamo Sassari

Career highlights
- LBA champion (2015); 2x Italian Cup champion (2014, 2015); Italian Supercup champion (2015)

Massimo Chessa (born April 30, 1988 in Sassari) is a professional Italian basketball player for Dinamo Sassari in the Italian Lega Basket Serie A (LBA). Standing at 188 cm (6 ft 2 in), he plays as point guard or shooting guard.
