= Henri Drell =

Estonian basketball player (born 2000)

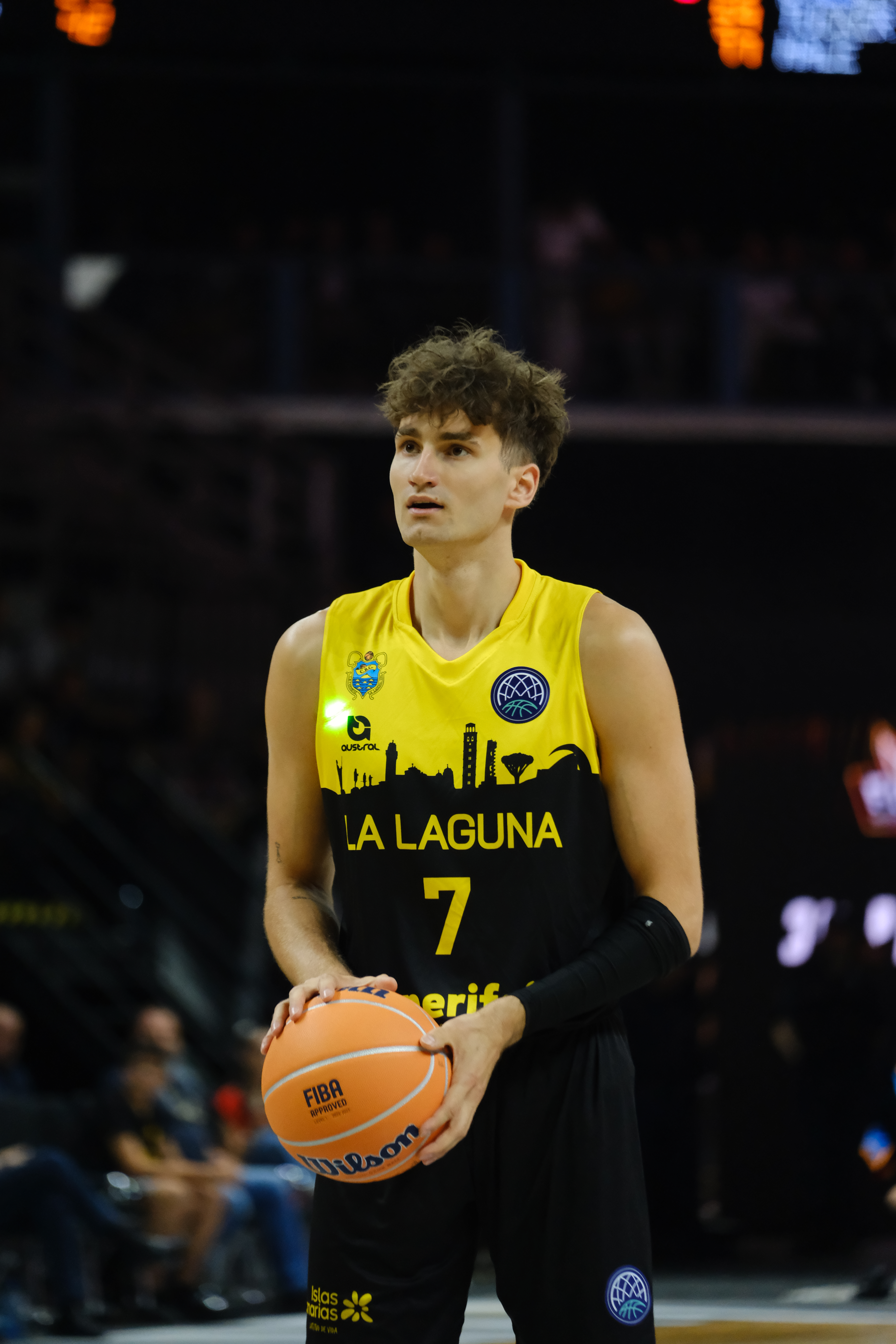
- Drell with La Laguna Tenerife in 2025

No. 0 – Neptūnas Klaipėda
- Position: Small forward
- League: LKL; EuroCup

Personal information
- Born: 25 April 2000 (age 26) Tallinn, Estonia
- Listed height: 2.06 m (6 ft 9 in)
- Listed weight: 100 kg (220 lb)

Career information
- NBA draft: 2022: undrafted
- Playing career: 2015–present

Career history
- 2015–2016: Audentes
- 2016–2019: Brose Bamberg
- 2016–2019: →Baunach Young Pikes
- 2019–2021: VL Pesaro
- 2022–2023: Windy City Bulls
- 2023: Chorale Roanne
- 2023–2024: Chicago Bulls
- 2023–2024: →Windy City Bulls
- 2024–2025: Rip City Remix
- 2025: Tenerife
- 2025–2026: Joventut Badalona
- 2026–present: Neptūnas Klaipėda

Career highlights
- Italian Cup Best Offensive Player (2021)
- Stats at NBA.com
- Stats at Basketball Reference
Medals
Men's basketball
Representing Estonia
FIBA Europe U-18 Championship Division B
| Bronze medal – third place | 2017 Estonia | U18 Team |

Henri Drell (born 25 April 2000) is an Estonian professional basketball player for Neptūnas Klaipėda of the Lithuanian Basketball League (LKL) and the EuroCup. He also represents the Estonian national basketball team internationally. Standing 2.05 metres (6 ft 9 in), he mainly plays as a small forward. He is also the second Estonian player to ever play in the NBA.

== Early life and youth career ==
Drell was born in Tallinn, Estonia. He started playing basketball at nine years of age. He joined a small club in Estonia and moved to BC Kalev/Cramo youth after that.

In July 2016, Drell moved to Brose Bamberg, Germany, where he started to play in the German Under-19 Youth Bundesliga (NBBL- Nachwuchs-Basketball-Bundesliga). In May 2019, Drell led his NBBL team (TSV Breitengüßbach) to the silver medal. On 27 February 2019, he was selected to play in the 2019 NBBL All-Star Game.

In February 2018, Drell played for Brose Bamberg's U18 team at Munich's Adidas Next Generation Tournament (ANGT). He was selected to the All-Tournament Team after leading the event with 27 points, 5.8 rebounds, 2.8 assists per game and a Performance Index Rating (PIR) of 26.3. Later in June, he attended the NBA Global Camp in Treviso, Italy.

== Professional career ==
=== Audentes (2015–2016) ===
In September 2015, Drell joined his hometown team Audentes/Noortekoondis.

=== Brose Bamberg (2016–2019) ===
On 1 July 2016, Drell signed a six-year contract with German club Brose Bamberg. He made his professional debut for Brose Bamberg on 18 March 2019, recording 2 points in a 100–74 win over Eisbären Bremerhaven.

Drell mainly played with Baunach Young Pikes, the farm team of Brose Bamberg, in the German 2nd Division (ProA). In the 2018–19 season, Drell's stats of 13.1 points, 3.9 rebounds and 1.6 assists per game for Baunach showed marked improvement over the previous year, playing in the ProA. On 2 February 2019, he was named the ProA Youngster of the Month. Drell eventually finished second in Pro A Young Player of the Year voting.

On 19 April 2019, he declared for the 2019 NBA draft. ESPN ranked Drell 55th out of 100 draft prospects, but later on, he withdrew from the draft to try to improve his draft stock for the 2020 NBA draft.

=== Victoria Libertas Pesaro (2019–2021) ===
On 19 July 2019, Drell signed with Italy's Victoria Libertas Pesaro of the Lega Basket Serie A. He made his professional debut for VL Pesaro on 22 September 2019, recording two points and three rebounds in 25 minutes and a 72–80 loss over Fortitudo Bologna. However, the season ended prematurely because of the COVID-19 pandemic.

In his second season with Victoria Libertas Pesaro under coach Jasmin Repeša, Drell played 24 games and started in 12, averaging 16.6 minutes per game and making huge improvements throughout the season, mainly in defence and shooting. He finished the season shooting 40% from the three-point line and 50% from two-point range. On 12 January, Drell helped VL Pesaro to qualify for the Italian Basketball Cup after a ten-year drought.

In February 2021, in a prestigious Italian Basketball Cup, Drell had a breakout tournament, where in the quarter-finals he recorded his LBA career-high 23 points, shooting 7-of-9 from the field, with five rebounds in an overtime 115–110 win over Dinamo Sassari. Drell helped his team reach their seventh Italian Cup finals, beating Happy Casa Brindisi in the semi-finals. He eventually lost to AX Armani Exchange Milano in the final, where he posted 12 points and four rebounds in 23 minutes. Drell was named "Best Offensive Player" in the tournament. He finished the tournament averaging 12.7 points, 3.3 rebounds, and 1 assist per game. Drell also had the best shooting percentages in the tournament: 63.6% from the two-point range and 62.5% from the three-point range. He parted ways with the team on 30 November 2021.

=== Windy City Bulls (2022–2023) ===
On 15 January 2022, NBA Draft-eligible Drell was acquired from the available player pool by the Windy City Bulls of the NBA G League.

In April 2022, Drell made history for the Windy City Bulls, becoming tenth in all-time blocks in franchise history, despite playing only 17.3 minutes per game over 29 games in the season.

After going undrafted in the 2022 NBA draft, he signed an NBA Summer League contract with the Chicago Bulls.

On 12 October 2022, the Chicago Bulls signed Drell to an Exhibit-10 contract and immediately waived him on the same day. He later re-signed with the Windy City Bulls and ended the season averaging 11.6 points, 6 rebounds, and 2.5 assists per game.

=== Chorale Roanne Basket (France) (2023) ===
On 9 April 2023, Drell returned to Europe, signing for the remainder of the season with French club Chorale Roanne Basket of the LNB Pro A.

=== Chicago / Windy City Bulls (2023–2024) ===
On 12 September 2023, Drell signed with the Chicago Bulls, but was waived on 12 October. On 2 November, Drell rejoined the Windy City Bulls. On 16 December, Drell signed a two-way contract with Chicago. Drell made his NBA debut on 14 March against the Los Angeles Clippers, scoring 2 points and dishing out 2 assists. He became the second Estonian player to ever play in the NBA after Martin Müürsepp, who debuted with the Miami Heat in 1996.

=== Rip City Remix (2024–2025) ===
On 13 August 2024, Drell signed with the Portland Trail Blazers, but was waived on 27 September. On 28 October, he joined the Rip City Remix.

=== La Laguna Tenerife (2025) ===
On March 13, 2025, Drell signed with the La Laguna Tenerife of the Spanish Liga ACB and the Basketball Champions League.

=== Joventut Badalona (2025–2026) ===
On September 16, 2025, Drell signed with Joventut Badalona of the Spanish Liga ACB. On March 7, 2026, Henri Drell made single-game performance history against Granada. Drell recorded an astonishing +46 plus-minus rating in just 22 minutes on the court. This performance tied the all-time Liga ACB single-game plus-minus record. The historic record was originally set exclusively by former EuroLeague and NBA veteran Victor Claver for FC Barcelona during the 2020–21 season.

=== Neptūnas Klaipėda (2026–present) ===
On August 18, 2026, Drell signed one–year contract with Neptūnas Klaipėda of the Lithuanian Basketball League (LKL) and the EuroCup.

== National team career ==
=== Junior national team ===
Drell competed for Estonia for the first time at the 2016 FIBA U16 European Championship in Radom, Poland. He helped the Estonia national under-16 team to avoid relegation while averaging 14.1 points and 7.1 rebounds per game.

Drell played in the 2018 FIBA Europe Under-18 Championship in Division B, where he was named to the All-Star Five after ranking third among all players with 19 points per game and helping his team finish in fourth place.

=== Senior national team ===
He debuted for the senior Estonian national team on 21 February 2019, in a 2019 FIBA Basketball World Cup qualifier against Serbia, scoring 4 points in a 71–70 home victory.

In February 2021, Drell posted 12 points, including the game-winning shot and three rebounds in 28 minutes in a 105–101 victory over Italy, leading Estonia to their third Eurobasket tournament of the century. He finished Eurobasket 2022 qualification, averaging 7.8 points and 2.4 rebounds in 5 games.

As a member of the senior Estonian national team, Drell had a breakout tournament at the Eurobasket 2022, where he recorded 20 points, shooting 8-of-12 from the field, with three rebounds in a blowout win against Great Britain, earning him the TLC Player of the Game honours. He finished the tournament averaging 8.6 points while shooting 40% from the three-point-line and grabbing 5 rebounds per game in 25 minutes, helping Estonia finish 19th out of 24.

== Personal life ==
Henri Drell is from a basketball background. His father was a former professional basketball player who played for Kalev. His mother and sister were professional basketball players on the Estonia women's national basketball team.

== Career statistics ==
Legend
| GP | Games played | GS | Games started | MPG | Minutes per game |
| FG% | Field-goal percentage | 3P% | 3-point field-goal percentage | FT% | Free-throw percentage |
| RPG | Rebounds per game | APG | Assists per game | SPG | Steals per game |
| BPG | Blocks per game | PPG | Points per game | PIR | Performance index rating |
| **Bold** | Career high |

=== NBA ===
==== Regular season ====
| Year | Team | GP | GS | MPG | FG% | 3P% | FT% | RPG | APG | SPG | BPG | PPG |
|---|---|---|---|---|---|---|---|---|---|---|---|---|
| 2023–24 | Chicago | 4 | 0 | 7.5 | .400 | .333 | .500 | 1.0 | 1.0 | .5 | .3 | 2.8 |
| Career | | 4 | 0 | 7.5 | .400 | .333 | .500 | 1.0 | 1.0 | .5 | .3 | 2.8 |

=== Domestic leagues and other leagues ===
| Season | Team | League | GP | MPG | FG% | 3P% | FT% | RPG | APG | SPG | BPG | PPG |
|---|---|---|---|---|---|---|---|---|---|---|---|---|
| 2015–16 | Audentes/Noortekoondis | KML | 4 | 16.0 | .444 | .250 | .400 | 2.0 | 1.2 | .5 | .0 | 4.5 |
| 2016–17 | Baunach Young Pikes | ProA | 6 | 8.1 | .429 | .000 | 1.000 | 1.5 | .0 | .2 | .0 | 2.0 |
| 2017–18 | Baunach Young Pikes | ProA | 24 | 16.3 | .496 | .340 | .649 | 1.6 | .8 | .5 | .0 | 6.1 |
| 2018–19 | Baunach Young Pikes | ProA | 29 | 28.8 | .394 | .297 | .673 | 3.9 | 1.6 | 1.2 | .4 | 13.1 |
| 2018–19 | Brose Bamberg | BBL | 3 | 8.1 | .500 | – | .500 | 1.0 | .7 | .0 | .0 | 2.0 |
| 2019–20 | Victoria Libertas Pesaro | LBA | 15 | 17.1 | .351 | .235 | .667 | 2.1 | 1.1 | .3 | .4 | 4.7 |
| 2020–21 | Victoria Libertas Pesaro | LBA | 24 | 16.6 | .459 | .400 | .611 | 2.5 | .5 | .4 | .3 | 5.8 |
| 2021–22 | Victoria Libertas Pesaro | LBA | 7 | 12.4 | .286 | .200 | .600 | 1.3 | .4 | .3 | .0 | 1.7 |
| 2021–22 | Windy City Bulls | NBA G League | 29 | 17.9 | .372 | .308 | .500 | 3.0 | 1.2 | .9 | 1.0 | 5.2 |
| 2022–23 | Windy City Bulls | NBA G League | 30 | 31.2 | .472 | .333 | .756 | 5.9 | 2.6 | 1.2 | .6 | 11.7 |
| 2022–23 | Chorale Roanne Basket | LNB Pro A | 6 | 23.2 | .425 | .263 | 1.000 | 3.3 | 1.8 | .7 | .3 | 10.0 |
| 2023–24 | Windy City Bulls | NBA G League | 30 | 33.8 | .437 | .316 | .746 | 8.4 | 2.8 | 1.6 | 1.1 | 15.6 |
| 2024–25 | Rip City Remix | NBA G League | 20 | 34.0 | .481 | .336 | .649 | 7.5 | 3.5 | .9 | .5 | 18.3 |

=== Estonia national team ===
| Year | Tournament | National Team | GP | GS | MPG | FG% | 3P% | FT% | RPG | APG | SPG | BPG | PPG |
|---|---|---|---|---|---|---|---|---|---|---|---|---|---|
| 2016 | 2016 FIBA Europe Under-16 Championship | Estonia U-16 | 7 | 7 | 25.1 | .376 | .294 | .818 | 7.1 | 1.9 | 2.1 | .6 | 14.1 |
| 2017 | 2017 FIBA U18 European Championship Division B | Estonia U-18 | 8 | 8 | 24.3 | .416 | .314 | .833 | 4.4 | 2.1 | 1.2 | .6 | 12.5 |
| 2018 | 2018 FIBA Europe Under-18 Championship Division B | Estonia U-18 | 7 | 7 | 26.8 | .469 | .333 | .861 | 5.7 | 1.7 | 1.4 | .7 | 19.0 |
| 2019 | 2019 Basketball World Cup qualification | Estonia | 2 | 0 | 13.8 | .545 | .333 | .833 | .0 | .5 | 1.5 | .0 | 9.0 |
| 2020 | EuroBasket 2022 qualification | Estonia | 5 | 0 | 18.5 | .438 | .462 | .556 | 2.4 | .8 | .8 | .6 | 7.8 |
| 2022 | EuroBasket 2022 | Estonia | 5 | 5 | 25.0 | .459 | .400 | 1.000 | 5.0 | 1.8 | 1.4 | .8 | 8.6 |
| 2025 | EuroBasket 2025 | Estonia | 5 | 3 | 21.8 | .365 | .200 | .400 | 2.8 | 2.0 | 1.0 | .4 | 8.8 |

== Awards and accomplishments ==
Professional career

- Italian Basketball Cup Best Offensive Player (2021)
