= Lipnica Gornja =

- Village
- Location within Bosnia and Herzegovina
- Coordinates: 44.602532°N 18.6159537°E
- Country: Bosnia and Herzegovina
- Entity: Federation of Bosnia and Herzegovina
- Canton: Tuzla
- Municipality: Tuzla

Area
  - Total: 2.70 sq mi (6.99 km^{2})

Population (2013)
  - Total: 1,264
  - Density: 468/sq mi (181/km^{2})
- Time zone: UTC+1 (CET)
  - Summer (DST): UTC+2 (CEST)

Lipnica Gornja is a village in the municipality of Tuzla, Tuzla Canton, Bosnia and Herzegovina.

== Demographics ==
According to the 2013 census, its population was 1,264.

Ethnicity in 2013
Ethnicity	Number	Percentage
Bosniaks	759	60.0%
Croats	421	33.3%
Serbs	4	0.3%
other/undeclared	80	6.3%
Total	1,264	100%
