= Andrija Stipanović =

Basketball player

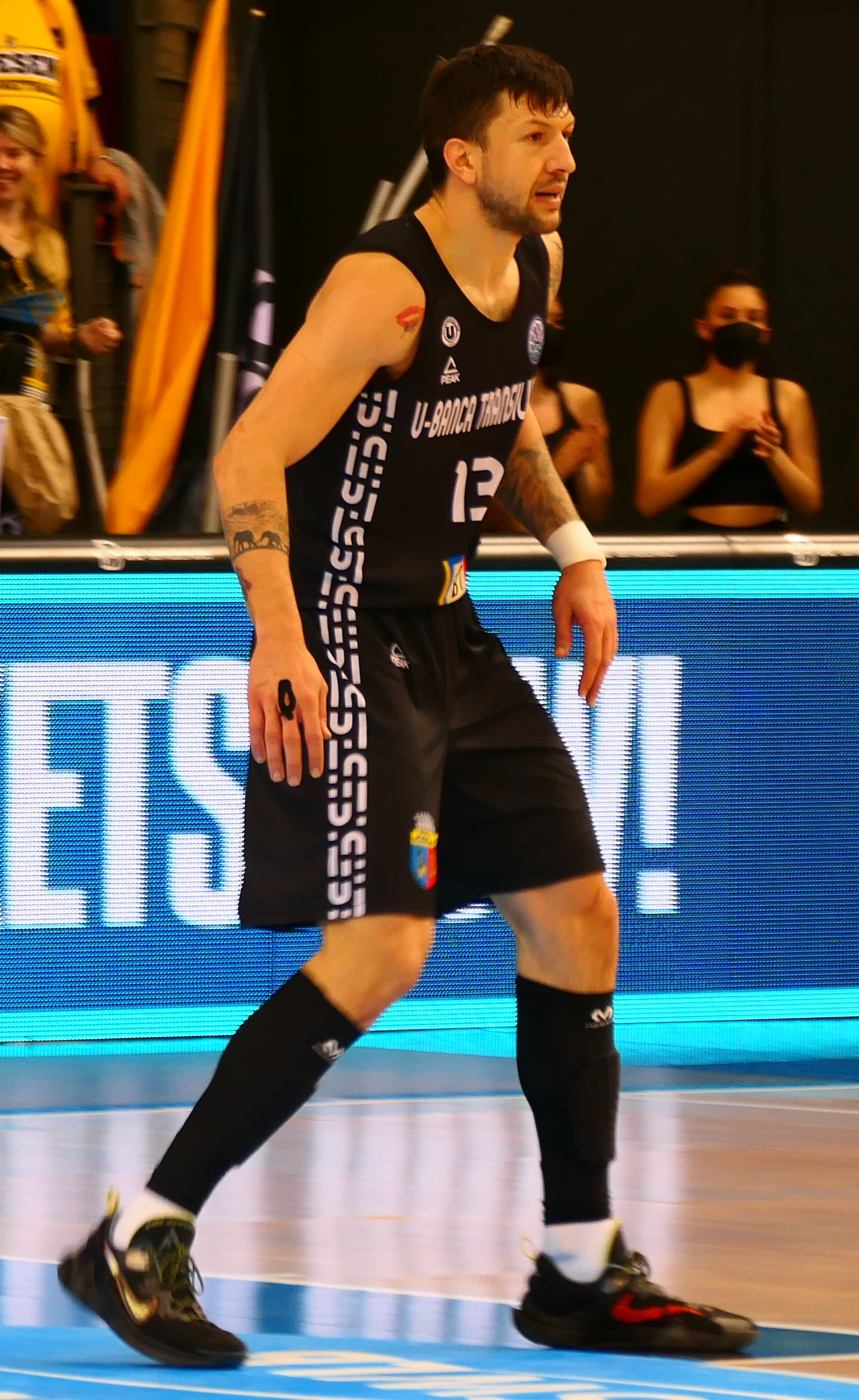
- Stipanović with U-BT Cluj-Napoca in April 2022

Split
- Title: Assistant coach
- League: Croatian League

Personal information
- Born: 18 December 1986 (age 39) Mostar, SR Bosnia and Herzegovina, SFR Yugoslavia
- Listed height: 2.09 m (6 ft 10 in)
- Listed weight: 119 kg (262 lb)

Career information
- NBA draft: 2008: undrafted
- Playing career: 2005–2025
- Position: Center
- Number: 13, 31

Career history

Playing
- 2005–2007: Hermes Analitica
- 2007–2009: Split
- 2009–2011: Liège
- 2011–2012: Juvecaserta
- 2012–2013: Vanoli Cremona
- 2013: Telenet Oostende
- 2013–2016: Trabzonspor
- 2016–2017: Büyükçekmece
- 2017–2020: Cedevita/Cedevita Olimpija
- 2020–2024: U-BT Cluj-Napoca
- 2024: Lietkabelis Panevėžys
- 2024–2025: Cedevita Olimpija

Coaching
- 2025–present: Split (assistant)

Career highlights
- Croatian League champion (2018); 4× Romanian League champion (2021–2024); Slovenian League champion (2025); 2× Romanian Supercup champion (2021, 2022); 2× Croatian Cup winner (2018, 2019); 2× Romanian Cup winner (2023, 2024); Slovenian Cup winner (2025); ABA League Supercup winner (2017); ABA League Supercup MVP (2017)

Andrija Stipanović (born 18 December 1986) is a Bosnian professional basketball coach and former player. He also represented the Bosnia and Herzegovina national basketball team internationally.

== Professional career ==
Stipanović spent the 2019-20 season with Cedevita Olimpija of the Slovenian League, averaging 6.1 points and 3.4 rebounds per game. On 26 June 2020 he signed with Cluj.

On 27 September 2024, Stipanović signed a short-term contract with Lietkabelis Panevėžys of the Lithuanian Basketball League (LKL).

On 21 November 2024, Stipanović signed with Cedevita Olimpija, returning to the club for a second stint.
