= 1881 Düzce Belediye =

- Leagues: Turkish Basketball First League
- Founded: 1986; 39 years ago
- Arena: Kalıcı Konutlar Merkez Spor Salonu
- Capacity: 2,500
- Location: Düzce, Turkey
- Head coach: Gokhan Guney
- Website: duzce.bel.tr

1881 Düzce Belediye is a Turkish basketball club based in Düzce. It plays in the Turkish Basketball First League, the national second division. The Kalıcı Konutlar Merkez Spor Salonu, which has a capacity of 2,500 people, is the home arena of the club.
