= ABA League Supercup =

ABA SuperCup
- Organising body: ABA League JTD
- Founded: July 2017; 8 years ago
- First season: 2017–18
- Country: Bosnia and Herzegovina; Croatia; North Macedonia; Montenegro; Serbia; Slovenia
- Confederation: ABA League
- Number of teams: 8
- Current champions: (Montenegro) SC Derby (2023)
- Most championships: Cedevita; Crvena zvezda Partizan; SC Derby (1 each)
- Most appearances: Budućnost; Partizan (4 each)
- TV partners: Arena Sport
- Website: aba-liga.com

The ABA League Supercup, also credited as ABA Super Cup, is an annual men's professional basketball supercup competition between teams from the ABA League. It is run by the ABA League JTD. It is a regional competition, that is contested between teams from six countries: Bosnia and Herzegovina, Croatia, Macedonia, Montenegro, Serbia and Slovenia.

== History ==
The ABA League Assembly, held on July 24, 2017, in Belgrade, Serbia, decided to organize the ABA League Supercup, with 8 participants.

In 2017, the first edition of the ABA Super Cup took place in Bar, Montenegro, where Cedevita became champions. In the second season, the teams met in Laktaši, where Crvena zvezda became champions. The third ABA Super Cup took place in Zagreb in 2019 and was won by Partizan.

Teams from Bosnia and Herzegovina, Croatia, Republic of Macedonia, Montenegro, Serbia, and Slovenia previously played in a similar competition, when they were part of SFR Yugoslavia. The Yugoslav Basketball Cup was played for 33 years, from 1959 to 1992 (not held in 1961, 1963–68). In 1992, the Serbian club Partizan, was the last winner of that competition, while the Croatian club Cibona, won the most titles in that competition.

On 29 June 2020, the ABA League Assembly canceled the 2020 tournament due to the COVID-19 pandemic. The 2020 tournament would have been played on 20–23 September 2020 in Podgorica, Montenegro.

== Title holders ==
- 2017 (Croatia) Cedevita
- 2018 (Serbia) Crvena zvezda mts
- 2019 (Serbia) Partizan NIS
- 2023 (Montenegro) SC Derby

== Finals ==
Year	Host	Final		
Year	Host	Champion	Score	Runner-up
2017; Details	(Montenegro); Bar	(Croatia); Cedevita	78–69	(Montenegro); Budućnost VOLI
2018; Details	(Bosnia and Herzegovina); Laktaši	(Serbia); Crvena zvezda mts	89–75	(Montenegro); Budućnost VOLI
2019; Details	(Croatia); Zagreb	(Serbia); Partizan NIS	99–77	(Slovenia); Cedevita Olimpija
2020; Details	(Montenegro); Podgorica	Canceled due to the COVID-19 pandemic		
2021–2022	—	Not held		
2023; Details	(Montenegro); Podgorica	(Montenegro); SC Derby	83–81	(Serbia); Partizan Mozzart Bet

== All-time participants ==
The following is a list of clubs that have played in the Adriatic Supercup, at any time, since its formation in 2017, to the current season.

=== Key ===
Defunct	Defunct teams
WD	Withdrew participation
1st	Champions
2nd	Runners-up
–	Did not qualify
^{T}	Top seed
^{H}	Host

=== List of participants ===
Team	17	18	19	23	Total seasons	Highest finish
(Bosnia and Herzegovina) Igokea	5th	QF^{H}	–	4th	3	4th
(Croatia) Cedevita	1st^{T}	SF	–	–	2	Winner
(Croatia) Cibona	8th	–	QF^{H}	–	2	Quarter-finals
(Croatia) Zadar	–	QF	–	6th	2	Quarter-finals
(Montenegro) Budućnost	2nd	2nd^{T}	SF	3rd^{H}	4	Runner up
(Montenegro) Mornar	4th^{H}	QF	–	–	2	Semi-finals
(Montenegro) SC Derby	–	–	–	1st	1	Winner
(Serbia) Crvena zvezda	WD^{T}	1st	QF^{T}	WD	2	Winner
(Serbia) FMP	7th	–	QF	7th	3	Quarter-finals
(Serbia) Mega	3rd	–	QF	5th	3	Semi-finals
(Serbia) Partizan	6th	SF	1st	2nd^{T}	4	Winner
(Slovenia) Cedevita Olimpija	Unfounded		2nd	8th	2	Runner up
(Slovenia) Koper Primorska	–	–	SF	Df.	1	Semi-finals
(Slovenia) Olimpija	–	QF	Defunct		1	Quarter-finals

== Awards ==
=== MVPs ===
Season	Player	Team	Ref.
2017	(Bosnia and Herzegovina) Andrija Stipanović	(Croatia) Cedevita	
2018	(Senegal) Mouhammad Faye	(Serbia) Crvena zvezda mts	
2019	(United States) Rashawn Thomas	(Serbia) Partizan NIS	
2023	(Bosnia and Herzegovina) Kenan Kamenjaš	(Montenegro) SC Derby	

== See also ==
- Yugoslav Basketball Cup
- Alpe Adria Cup
