= 2009–10 FC Barcelona Bàsquet season =

Spanish basketball club season

Regal FC Barcelona
2009–10 season
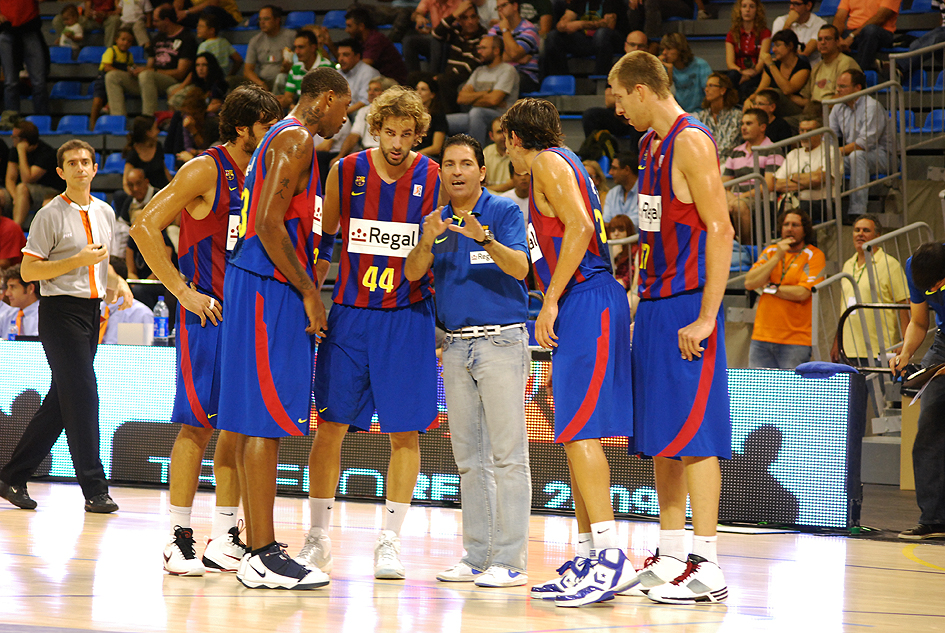
- Xavi Pascual giving the team instructions in September 2009
- President: Joan Laporta
- Head coach: Xavi Pascual
- Arena: Palau Blaugrana
- Liga ACB: Runners-up
- EuroLeague: Winners
- Copa del Rey: Winners
- Supercopa de España: Winners
- Highest home attendance: 7,585 vs Real Madrid (25 March 2010)
- Average home attendance: 5,116 (in EuroLeague); 5,035 (in Liga ACB)
- Biggest win: 105–55 vs Gran Canaria 2014 (31 January 2010)
- Biggest defeat: 71–60 vs Lagun Aro GBC (17 April 2010)
Home	Away
- All statistics correct as of 2 July 2025.

The 2009–10 season was FC Barcelona's 83rd in existence, their 45th consecutive season in the top flight of Spanish basketball and 11th consecutive season in the EuroLeague.

In the 2009–10 season, FC Barcelona competed in the Liga ACB, Copa del Rey, Spanish Supercup and EuroLeague, winning the latter three.

== Overview ==
=== Pre-season ===
Head coach Xavi Pascual stayed at the helm for his second season after taking over the team the previous March.

Four players left the team during the summer; David Andersen and Ersan İlyasova terminated their contracts and left for the NBA while Andre Barrett made his way to the NBA Development League after reaching a mutual agreement with the club to terminate his contract. Daniel Santiago returned to his home country, Puerto Rico, after his contract with Barcelona expired.

Small forward Pete Mickeal was the first signing of the summer, announced on June 29. He had previously faced Barcelona in the 2009 ACB Finals while playing for Caja Laboral. American power forward Terence Morris was announced as a new Barcelona player on July 12, acquired from CSKA Moscow through a contract buyout. Senegalese center Boniface N'Dong joined on July 18, signing as a free agent after his contract with Unicaja had expired. On August 18, Barcelona reinforced the center position by signing Slovene Erazem Lorbek, also from CSKA Moscow. Finally, Barcelona acquired young talent Ricky Rubio from rivals DKV Joventut. Barcelona signed the Catalan point guard by reportedly paying a record transfer fee of 3.7 million euros, the highest in Spanish basketball history.

In September, Barcelona played friendly games against Bàsquet Manresa and Bilbao Basket before taking part in an exhibition tournament held in Reus. Barcelona won the 'StagePro' tournament after beating Valencia Basket in the semifinals and Real Madrid in the final. Between September 26 and 27, Barcelona took part in the 2009 edition of the Lliga Catalana de Bàsquet, held in the Palau Sant Jordi, Barcelona. After beating CB Sant Josep in the semifinals, Barcelona won the final against Joventut Badalona, with Ricky Rubio named Final MVP.

== Players ==
=== Roster ===
Note: Flags indicate national team eligibility at FIBA-sanctioned events. Players may hold other non-FIBA nationalities not displayed.

FC Barcelona roster
Players
Coaches

Pos.	No.	Nat.	Name	Ht.	Wt.	Age
G	5	(Italy)	Basile, Gianluca	1.92 m (6 ft 4 in)	95 kg (209 lb)	35 – 24 January 1975
PF	8	(Spain)	Trias, Jordi	2.06 m (6 ft 9 in)	109 kg (240 lb)	29 – 5 November 1980
PG	9	(Spain)	Rubio, Ricky	1.88 m (6 ft 2 in)	86 kg (190 lb)	19 – 21 October 1990
PG	10	(Slovenia)	Lakovič, Jaka	1.86 m (6 ft 1 in)	95 kg (209 lb)	31 – 9 July 1978
SG	11	(Spain)	Navarro, Juan Carlos	1.93 m (6 ft 4 in)	91 kg (201 lb)	29 – 12 June 1980
SF	13	(Czech Republic)	Bartoň, Luboš	2.02 m (6 ft 8 in)	104 kg (229 lb)	30 – 7 April 1980
C	17	(Spain)	Vázquez, Fran	2.08 m (6 ft 10 in)	105 kg (231 lb)	27 – 1 May 1983
C	21	(Senegal)	N'Dong, Boniface	2.13 m (7 ft 0 in)	111 kg (245 lb)	32 – 3 September 1977
PF	23	(United States)	Morris, Terence	2.06 m (6 ft 9 in)	109 kg (240 lb)	31 – 11 January 1979
PG	24	(Spain)	Sada, Víctor	1.92 m (6 ft 4 in)	93 kg (205 lb)	26 – 8 March 1984
PF/C	25	(Slovenia)	Lorbek, Erazem	2.10 m (6 ft 11 in)	113 kg (249 lb)	26 – 21 February 1984
SF	33	(United States)	Mickeal, Pete	2.01 m (6 ft 7 in)	109 kg (240 lb)	32 – 22 February 1978
G/F	44	(Spain)	Grimau, Roger (C)	1.96 m (6 ft 5 in)	95 kg (209 lb)	31 – 14 July 1978

Head coach

- (Spain) Xavi Pascual

Assistant coach(es)

- (Spain) Augustí Julbe
- (Spain) Josep Maria Berrocal
- (Spain) Íñigo Zorzano

Team manager

- (Spain) Joan Creus

Legend

- (C) Team captain
- Injured

- Roster

=== Depth chart ===
Pos.	Starting 5	Bench 1	Bench 2
C	Boniface N'Dong	Fran Vázquez †
PF	Erazem Lorbek	Terence Morris *
SF	Pete Mickeal *	Jordi Trias †	Luboš Bartoň
SG	Juan Carlos Navarro †	Gianluca Basile	Roger Grimau †
PG	Ricky Rubio ‡	Víctor Sada †	Jaka Lakovič

Notes: Blue † – homegrown player; (Note: A homegrown player is a player that played for at least three years before the age of 20 on a Spanish team. In Liga ACB, the team must register at least four homegrown players in rosters of 10–12 players or at least three homegrown players in rosters of 8–9 players. In EuroLeague, the team did not have any limitations regarding the number of homegrown players.) Red * – overseas player; (Note: An overseas player is a player from outside EEA, FIBA Europe or ACP states. In Liga ACB, the team may register at most two overseas players. In EuroLeague, the team did not have any limitations regarding the number of overseas players.) Green ‡ – youth player (Note: In Liga ACB, the team may register under-22 players linked to the youth system. In EuroLeague, the team may register under-20 players linked to the youth system.)

=== On loan ===
Players out on loan
Nat.	Player	Position	Team	On loan since
(Spain)	Álex Hernández	PG	(Spain) Cornellà	September 2009–June 2010
(Senegal)	Ablaye Mbaye	C	(Spain) Cornellà	September 2009–June 2010
(Spain)	Xavi Rabaseda	G/F	(Spain) Cornellà	September 2009–June 2010
(Senegal)	Mamadou Samb	C	(Spain) Cornellà	September 2009–June 2010

=== Roster changes ===
==== In ====
No.	Pos.	Nat.	Name	Moving from		Type	Date	Source
33	SF	(United States)	Pete Mickeal	Caja Laboral	(Spain)	Transfer	29 Jun 2009	
23	PF	(United States)	Terence Morris	CSKA Moscow	(Russia)	Contract buyout	12 Jul 2009	
21	C	(Senegal)	Boniface N'Dong	Unicaja	(Spain)	End of contract	18 Jul 2009	
25	PF/C	(Slovenia)	Erazem Lorbek	CSKA Moscow	(Russia)	Transfer	18 Aug 2009	
9	PG	(Spain)	Ricky Rubio	Joventut Badalona	(Spain)	Transfer	1 Sep 2009	

==== Out ====
No.	Pos.	Nat.	Name	Moving to		Type	Date	Source
6	PG	(United States)	Andre Barrett	Idaho Stampede	(United States)	Parted ways	26 Jun 2009	
25	C	(Puerto Rico)	Daniel Santiago	Vaqueros de Bayamón	(Puerto Rico)	End of contract	30 Jun 2009	
13	PF/C	(Australia)	David Andersen	Houston Rockets	(United States)	Contract buyout	16 Jul 2009	
21	PF	(Turkey)	Ersan İlyasova	Milwaukee Bucks	(United States)	Parted ways	17 Jul 2009	

== Pre-season and friendlies ==
=== Friendly matches ===
30 August 2009	Bàsquet Manresa (Catalonia)	52–75	(Catalonia) Regal FC Barcelona	Sant Julià de Vilatorta
18:30	Scoring by quarter: 12–19, 18–27, 13–15, 9–14
	Pts: Nivins 16	Report	Pts: Vázquez 14	Arena: Pavelló Esportiu Municipal; Referees: Xavier Amorós, Joan Carles Mitjana, Pere Munar

6 September 2009	Bizkaia Bilbao Basket (Basque Country (autonomous community))	64–78	(Catalonia) Regal FC Barcelona	Encamp
19:30
	Pts: Markota, Seibutis 11	Report	Pts: N'Dong 20	Arena: Complex Esportiu i Sociocultural

=== StagePro Reus ===
19 September 2009 Semifinal	Regal FC Barcelona (Catalonia)	71–65	(Valencian Community) Valencia Basket	Reus
20:00
				Arena: Pavelló Olímpic de Reus

20 September 2009 Final	Real Madrid (Community of Madrid)	76–89	(Catalonia) Regal FC Barcelona	Reus
19:00	Scoring by quarter: 26–25, 15–25, 16–14, 19–25
	Pts: Kaukėnas 18	Report	Pts: three players 15	Arena: Pavelló Olímpic de Reus; Referees: Xavier Amorós, Òscar Perea, Anna Cardús

=== Lliga Catalana de Bàsquet ===
26 September 2009 Semifinal	Regal FC Barcelona (Catalonia)	95–53	(Catalonia) CB Sant Josep	Barcelona
19:00	Scoring by quarter: 25–15, 16–23, 33–9, 21–6
	Pts: Trias, Vázquez 16; Rebs: Vázquez 6 Asts: Sada 8 PIR: Lorbek, Trias 20	Report	Pts: Drevo 20; Rebs: Drevo 6 Asts: Sàbat 2 PIR: Drevo 20	Arena: Palau Sant Jordi; Referees: Joan Carles Mitjana, Lluis Guirao, Santiago Fernández

27 September 2009 Final	DKV Joventut (Catalonia)	38–62	(Catalonia) Regal FC Barcelona	Barcelona
18:15	Scoring by quarter: 18–13, 5–18, 9–6, 6–25
	Pts: Tripković 14; Rebs: Valters 5 Asts: Hernández-Sonseca 2 PIR: Tripković 9	Report	Pts: N'Dong 10; Rebs: Lorbek 7 Asts: Rubio 5 PIR: Rubio 15	Arena: Palau Sant Jordi; Attendance: 8,000; Referees: Xavier Amorós, Joan Carles Mitjana, Anna Cardús

== Competitions ==
=== Overview ===
Competition	First match	Last match	Starting round	Final position	Record							
Competition	First match	Last match	Starting round	Final position	Pld	W	D	L	PF	PA	PD	Win %
Liga ACB	10 October 2009	15 June 2010	Round 1	Runners-up	42	36		6	3,340	2,726	+614	85.71
EuroLeague	21 October 2009	9 May 2010	Round 1	Winners	22	20		2	1,747	1,425	+322	90.91
Copa del Rey	18 February 2010	21 February 2010	Quarter-finals	Winners	3	3		0	229	197	+32	100.00
Supercopa de España	2 October 2009	3 October 2009	Semi-finals	Winners	2	2		0	160	133	+27	100.00
Total					69	61	0	8	5,476	4,481	+995	88.41

Last updated: 17 June 2025
Source: Competitions

=== Liga ACB ===
==== League table ====
#	Teams	GP	W	L	PF	PA
1	Regal FC Barcelona	34	31	3	2736	2202
2	Caja Laboral	34	27	7	2734	2484
3	Real Madrid	34	27	7	2762	2442
4	Power Electronics Valencia	34	23	11	2637	2563
5	Unicaja	34	19	15	2721	2545

Last updated: May 19, 2010.
Source: ACB

==== Results summary ====
Overall						Home					Away				
Pld	W	L	PF	PA	PD	W	L	PF	PA	PD	W	L	PF	PA	PD
34	31	3	2736	2202	+534	17	0	1469	1100	+369	14	3	1267	1102	+165

Source: Competitive matches

==== Results by round ====
Round	1	2	3	4	5	6	7	8	9	10	11	12	13	14	15	16	17	18	19	20	21	22	23	24	25	26	27	28	29	30	31	32	33	34
Ground	A	H	A	H	A	H	H	A	H	A	A	H	H	A	H	A	H	H	A	H	A	H	A	A	H	A	H	A	H	A	H	A	H	A
Result	W	W	L	W	W	W	W	W	W	W	W	W	W	W	W	W	W	W	L	W	W	W	W	W	W	W	W	W	W	L	W	W	W	W
Position	3	1	5	4	2	2	2	2	2	2	2	1	1	1	1	1	1	1	1	1	1	1	1	1	1	1	1	1	1	1	1	1	1	1

Source: Competitive matches
A = Away; H = Home; W = Win; L = Loss; R = Rest

==== Matches ====
10 October 2009 1	Xacobeo Blu:sens	63–80	Regal FC Barcelona	Santiago de Compostela
20:00	Scoring by quarter: 16–21, 13–17, 14–21, 20–21
	Pts: Jackson 17; Rebs: Jackson 9 Asts: Stanic 5 PIR: Jackson 23	Boxscore	Pts: Navarro 19; Rebs: Lorbek 7 Asts: Navarro, Rubio 4 PIR: Lorbek 25	Arena: Pavillón Multiusos Fontes do Sar; Attendance: 6,050; Referees: Xavier Amorós, Carlos Sánchez Monserrat, Antonio Sacristán

14 October 2009 2	Regal FC Barcelona	87–62	Power Electronics Valencia	Barcelona
20:30	Scoring by quarter: 19–6, 23–23, 23–8, 22–25
	Pts: Navarro 24; Rebs: three players 4 Asts: Sada 7 PIR: Navarro 30	Boxscore	Pts: Marshall 17; Rebs: Claver 5 Asts: de Colo, Marshall 2 PIR: Marshall 18	Arena: Palau Blaugrana; Attendance: 4,450; Referees: Emilio Pérez Pizarro, José Javier Murgui, Carlos Peruga

18 October 2009 3	Gran Canaria 2014	67–65	Regal FC Barcelona	Las Palmas
12:30	Scoring by quarter: 18–14, 20–23, 15–9, 14–19
	Pts: Carroll 17; Rebs: Savané 7 Asts: Bellas 3 PIR: Moran 17	Boxscore	Pts: Navarro 23; Rebs: Mickeal 7 Asts: Navarro 3 PIR: Mickeal 21	Arena: Centro Insular de Deportes; Attendance: 4,970; Referees: Juan Carlos Mitjana, Vicente Bultó, Luis Miguel Castillo

24 October 2009 4	Regal FC Barcelona	92–59	DKV Joventut	Barcelona
18:00	Scoring by quarter: 25–18, 18–12, 29–13, 20–16
	Pts: Navarro 23; Rebs: Vázquez 5 Asts: Rubio 10; PIR: Rubio 25	Boxscore	Pts: Tucker 14; Rebs: Koffi 8 Asts: Valters 5 PIR: Koffi 14	Arena: Palau Blaugrana; Attendance: 6,816; Referees: Daniel Hierrezuelo, Antonio Conde, Pedro Munar

1 November 2009 5	Asefa Estudiantes	75–78	Regal FC Barcelona	Madrid
12:30	Scoring by quarter: 20–23, 20–17, 9–12, 26–26
	Pts: Ahearn 15; Rebs: Caner-Medley 8 Asts: Suárez 4 PIR: Suárez 17	Boxscore	Pts: Mickeal 15; Rebs: Mickeal, Vázquez 5 Asts: Navarro, Sada 4 PIR: Mickeal 19	Arena: Madrid Arena; Attendance: 9,500; Referees: Juan Carlos Arteaga, Juan José Martínez Díez, Miguel Ángel Pérez Niz

8 November 2009 6	Regal FC Barcelona	76–67	Cajasol	Barcelona
12:30	Scoring by quarter: 18–13, 24–17, 17–23, 17–14
	Pts: Grimau, Navarro 13; Rebs: Morris, N'Dong 4 Asts: Rubio 6 PIR: Rubio 15	Boxscore	Pts: Savanović 19; Rebs: Kirksay, Triguero 9 Asts: Calloway 4 PIR: Triguero 19	Arena: Palau Blaugrana; Attendance: 4,623; Referees: José Ramón García Ortiz, Juan Carlos García González, José Miguel García Leal

14 November 2009 7	Regal FC Barcelona	100–72	Caja Laboral	Barcelona
18:00	Scoring by quarter: 20–17, 30–19, 32–15, 18–21
	Pts: Morris, Navarro 18; Rebs: N'Dong 5 Asts: Rubio 10; PIR: Morris 21	Boxscore	Pts: Splitter 24; Rebs: Splitter 7 Asts: San Emeterio 4 PIR: Splitter 30	Arena: Palau Blaugrana; Attendance: 6,223; Referees: Miguel Ángel Pérez Pérez, Benjamín Jiménez, Carlos Sánchez Monserrat

18 November 2009 8	Ayuda en Acción Fuenlabrada	62–68	Regal FC Barcelona	Fuenlabrada
20:00	Scoring by quarter: 13–16, 12–18, 16–18, 21–16
	Pts: Batista 24; Rebs: Batista 13; Asts: Colom 4 PIR: Batista 25	Boxscore	Pts: Navarro 15; Rebs: Morris 13; Asts: three players 3 PIR: Morris 20	Arena: Fernando Martín; Attendance: 5,610; Referees: Emilio Pérez Pizarro, Juan Luis Redondo, Carlos García León

22 November 2009 9	Regal FC Barcelona	83–54	Lagun Aro GBC	Barcelona
12:30	Scoring by quarter: 18–9, 24–19, 24–10, 17–16
	Pts: Navarro 17; Rebs: Lorbek 5 Asts: Navarro 4 PIR: Navarro 23	Boxscore	Pts: Hopkins 12; Rebs: Panko 7 Asts: San Epifanio 3 PIR: Hopkins 15	Arena: Palau Blaugrana; Attendance: 4,523; Referees: Juan Carlos Mitjana, Francisco Araña, Juan José Martínez Díez

28 November 2009 10	Unicaja	57–63	Regal FC Barcelona	Málaga
18:00	Scoring by quarter: 13–18, 14–12, 10–10, 20–23
	Pts: Welsch 12; Rebs: Jiménez 6 Asts: Williams 3 PIR: Jiménez, Welsch 15	Boxscore	Pts: Navarro 18; Rebs: Morris 7 Asts: Rubio 5 PIR: Lorbek 21	Arena: Martín Carpena; Attendance: 10,000; Referees: Daniel Hierrezuelo, Óscar Perea, David Soto

6 December 2009 11	CB Granada	62–72	Regal FC Barcelona	Granada
12:30	Scoring by quarter: 14–19, 14–10, 18–24, 16–19
	Pts: Hendrix 16; Rebs: Hunter 10; Asts: Gianella, Ingles 4 PIR: Hendrix 19	Boxscore	Pts: Morris 16; Rebs: Vázquez 8 Asts: Sada 3 PIR: Morris 18	Arena: Palacio Deportes Granada; Attendance: 6,892; Referees: José Ramón García Ortiz, José Javier Murgui, Rubén Sánchez Mohedas

13 December 2009 12	Regal FC Barcelona	83–50	Blancos de Rueda Valladolid	Barcelona
12:30	Scoring by quarter: 23–14, 19–10, 22–17, 19–9
	Pts: Lorbek 18; Rebs: Lorbek 11; Asts: Navarro 5 PIR: Lorbek 29	Boxscore	Pts: Barnes 15; Rebs: Battle 7 Asts: García 5 PIR: Battle 10	Arena: Palau Blaugrana; Attendance: 4,374; Referees: Juan Carlos Arteaga, Santi Fernández, Antonio Sacristán

20 December 2009 13	Regal FC Barcelona	84–72	CB Murcia	Barcelona
12:30	Scoring by quarter: 27–17, 10–15, 32–23, 15–17
	Pts: Vázquez 18; Rebs: Lorbek, Vázquez 5 Asts: Rubio 8 PIR: Rubio 23	Boxscore	Pts: Vujanić 26; Rebs: Prestes 7 Asts: Robles, Vujanić 3 PIR: Vujanić 18	Arena: Palau Blaugrana; Attendance: 3,699; Referees: Emilio Pérez Pizarro, Carlos Peruga, Anna Cardús

27 December 2009 14	Real Madrid	57–79	Regal FC Barcelona	Madrid
20:30	Scoring by quarter: 14–21, 11–22, 15–23, 17–13
	Pts: Lavrinovič 19; Rebs: Dašić 5 Asts: Bullock 3 PIR: Lavrinovič 18	Boxscore	Pts: Rubio 18; Rebs: Lorbek 6 Asts: Rubio 7 PIR: Rubio 24	Arena: Palacio Vistalegre; Attendance: 13,000; Referees: Francisco De la Maza, Antonio Conde, Benjamín Jiménez

30 December 2009 15	Regal FC Barcelona	65–45	Suzuki Manresa	Barcelona
20:45	Scoring by quarter: 23–9, 11–5, 13–19, 18–12
	Pts: Navarro 20; Rebs: N'Dong 8 Asts: Rubio 4 PIR: Rubio 21	Boxscore	Pts: San Miguel 15; Rebs: Ivanov 8 Asts: San Miguel 4 PIR: Ivanov 15	Arena: Palau Blaugrana; Attendance: 6,035; Referees: José Ramón García Ortiz, Vicente Bultó, Rubén Sánchez Mohedas

2 January 2010 16	Bizkaia Bilbao Basket	65–87	Regal FC Barcelona	Barakaldo
18:00	Scoring by quarter: 13–21, 12–22, 19–23, 21–21
	Pts: Banić 23; Rebs: Banić, Markota 4 Asts: Salgado 4 PIR: Banić 30	Boxscore	Pts: Navarro 22; Rebs: Vázquez 6 Asts: Rubio 8 PIR: Navarro 24	Arena: Bizkaia Arena; Attendance: 10,500; Referees: José Antonio Martín Bertrán, Carlos Sánchez Monserrat, Carlos Peruga

10 January 2010 17	Regal FC Barcelona	114–72	Meridiano Alicante	Barcelona
12:30	Scoring by quarter: 29–9, 23–22, 27–25, 35–16
	Pts: Basile 26; Rebs: Mickeal 7 Asts: Rubio 7 PIR: Basile 28	Boxscore	Pts: Urtasun 14; Rebs: Stojić 7 Asts: four players 2 PIR: Urtasun 14	Arena: Palau Blaugrana; Attendance: 4,562; Referees: Xavier Amorós, Francisco Araña, Jorge Muñoz

17 January 2010 18	Regal FC Barcelona	103–82	Xacobeo Blu:sens	Barcelona
12:30	Scoring by quarter: 25–14, 29–17, 24–26, 25–25
	Pts: Navarro 17; Rebs: Mickeal 8 Asts: Navarro 6 PIR: Navarro 23	Boxscore	Pts: Vasileiadis 18; Rebs: Terry 8 Asts: Terry 4 PIR: Terry 22	Arena: Palau Blaugrana; Attendance: 5,567; Referees: Juan Luis Redondo, Carlos Cortés, Luis Miguel Castillo

23 January 2010 19	Power Electronics Valencia	60–59	Regal FC Barcelona	Valencia
18:00	Scoring by quarter: 8–15, 17–10, 13–17, 22–17
	Pts: Martínez 16; Rebs: Perović 9 Asts: Nielsen 3 PIR: Martínez 21	Boxscore	Pts: N'Dong 13; Rebs: Morris 7 Asts: Rubio 6 PIR: N'Dong 17	Arena: La Fonteta; Attendance: 9,000; Referees: Juan Carlos Arteaga, José Javier Murgui, Miguel Ángel Pérez Niz

31 January 2010 20	Regal FC Barcelona	105–55	Gran Canaria 2014	Barcelona
12:30	Scoring by quarter: 23–16, 28–14, 24–11, 30–14
	Pts: Navarro 24; Rebs: Trias 7 Asts: Sada 6 PIR: Navarro 26	Boxscore	Pts: Carroll 23; Rebs: Augustine 8 Asts: Moran, Savané 2 PIR: Carroll 17	Arena: Palau Blaugrana; Attendance: 5,166; Referees: José Ramón García Ortiz, Carlos Sánchez Monserrat, Carlos García León

6 February 2010 21	DKV Joventut	57–81	Regal FC Barcelona	Badalona
18:00	Scoring by quarter: 14–27, 19–18, 9–20, 15–16
	Pts: three players 8 Rebs: three players 5 Asts: Valters 4 PIR: Franch 12	Boxscore	Pts: Navarro 14; Rebs: Vázquez 6 Asts: Rubio 6 PIR: Grimau 17	Arena: Olímpic de Badalona; Attendance: 11,121; Referees: Xavier Amorós, Benjamín Jiménez, Carlos Cortés

13 February 2010 22	Regal FC Barcelona	79–70	Asefa Estudiantes	Barcelona
18:00	Scoring by quarter: 24–13, 18–23, 17–15, 20–19
	Pts: Basile 16; Rebs: Vázquez 7 Asts: Rubio 6 PIR: Lorbek 17	Boxscore	Pts: Lofton 20; Rebs: Suárez 7 Asts: three players 3 PIR: Suárez 19	Arena: Palau Blaugrana; Attendance: 6,043; Referees: Óscar Perea, Antonio Conde, David Soto

28 February 2010 23	Cajasol	64–71	Regal FC Barcelona	Seville
12:30	Scoring by quarter: 14–15, 16–17, 21–23, 13–16
	Pts: Savanović 20; Rebs: Triguero 5 Asts: Miso 5 PIR: Savanović 19	Boxscore	Pts: Navarro 18; Rebs: Vázquez 7 Asts: Rubio 5 PIR: Navarro 18	Arena: Palacio de los Deportes; Attendance: 7,600; Referees: Xavier Amorós, Juan Carlos García González, Jacobo Rial

7 March 2010 24	Blancos de Rueda Valladolid	59–73	Regal FC Barcelona	Valladolid
12:30	Scoring by quarter: 7–21, 17–16, 20–17, 15–19
	Pts: Barnes 16; Rebs: Barnes 10; Asts: Dumas 5 PIR: Barnes 18	Boxscore	Pts: Morris 20; Rebs: Morris 8 Asts: three players 3 PIR: Morris 28	Arena: Polideportivo Pisuerga; Attendance: 6,375; Referees: Juan Carlos Mitjana, Juan José Martínez Díez, Luis Miguel Castillo

14 March 2010 25	Regal FC Barcelona	79–72	CB Granada	Barcelona
12:30	Scoring by quarter: 17–14, 17–19, 20–22, 25–17
	Pts: Mickeal 23; Rebs: Mickeal 8 Asts: Grimau, Rubio 3 PIR: Mickeal 29	Boxscore	Pts: Hunter 17; Rebs: Hendrix 8 Asts: Stefánsson 3 PIR: Gutiérrez 15	Arena: Palau Blaugrana; Attendance: 5,435; Referees: Juan Carlos Arteaga, Santi Fernández, Francisco Zafra

20 March 2010 26	Caja Laboral	79–86	Regal FC Barcelona	Vitoria-Gasteiz
18:00	Scoring by quarter: 27–22, 18–27, 18–21, 16–16
	Pts: Barać 19; Rebs: Barać, Teletović 6 Asts: Huertas 5 PIR: Barać 23	Boxscore	Pts: Rubio 17; Rebs: N'Dong 9 Asts: Navarro 5 PIR: Rubio, Navarro 19	Arena: Fernando Buesa Arena; Attendance: 9,700; Referees: Daniel Hierrezuelo, José Javier Murgui, Carlos Peruga

27 March 2010 27	Regal FC Barcelona	71–66	Ayuda en Acción Fuenlabrada	Barcelona
18:00	Scoring by quarter: 24–24, 12–14, 18–6, 17–22
	Pts: Mickeal 17; Rebs: Vázquez 6 Asts: Sada 4 PIR: Mickeal 25	Boxscore	Pts: Mainoldi 19; Rebs: Batista 15; Asts: Fitch 3 PIR: Fitch 20	Arena: Palau Blaugrana; Attendance: 4,654; Referees: Óscar Perea, Francisco Araña, Antonio Sacristán

4 April 2010 28	Suzuki Manresa	82–87(OT)	Regal FC Barcelona	Manresa
12:30	Scoring by quarter: 19–15, 21–11, 19–21, 14–26, Overtime: 9–14
	Pts: Montañez 19; Rebs: Alzamora 6 Asts: three players 2 PIR: Ivanov 16	Boxscore	Pts: Navarro 25; Rebs: Lorbek 8 Asts: Navarro 4 PIR: Navarro 32	Arena: Nou Congost; Attendance: 4,800; Referees: Juan Carlos Mitjana, Benjamín Jiménez, Anna Cardús

10 April 2010 29	Regal FC Barcelona	78–73	Real Madrid	Barcelona
18:00	Scoring by quarter: 20–19, 22–6, 22–20, 14–28
	Pts: Navarro 20; Rebs: Morris 8 Asts: Navarro 4 PIR: Lorbek, Navarro 21	Boxscore	Pts: Llull 19; Rebs: Tomić 7 Asts: Tomić 3 PIR: Tomić 16	Arena: Palau Blaugrana; Attendance: 7,458; Referees: José Antonio Martín Bertrán, Antonio Conde, Carlos Sánchez Monserrat

17 April 2010 30	Lagun Aro GBC	71–60	Regal FC Barcelona	San Sebastián
18:00	Scoring by quarter: 22–14, 16–15, 18–20, 15–11
	Pts: Doblas 18; Rebs: Miralles 8 Asts: Úriz 7 PIR: Doblas 16	Boxscore	Pts: Lorbek 16; Rebs: Lorbek, N'Dong 7 Asts: Mickeal 4 PIR: Lorbek 19	Arena: Donostia Arena; Attendance: 8,075; Referees: Miguel Ángel Pérez Pérez, Juan Carlos García González, José Miguel García Leal

24 April 2010 31	Regal FC Barcelona	84–74	Unicaja	Barcelona
19:30	Scoring by quarter: 27–23, 23–14, 17–20, 17–17
	Pts: Vázquez 20; Rebs: Morris 9 Asts: Navarro 5 PIR: Vázquez 30	Boxscore	Pts: Freeland 17; Rebs: Freeland 7 Asts: three players 2 PIR: Freeland 19	Arena: Palau Blaugrana; Attendance: 5,276; Referees: Xavier Amorós, Benjamín Jiménez, Carlos García León

1 May 2010 32	CB Murcia	54–73	Regal FC Barcelona	Murcia
20:00	Scoring by quarter: 11–17, 14–18, 10–14, 19–24
	Pts: Vujanić 15; Rebs: Faverani 10; Asts: Williams 4 PIR: Faverani 22	Boxscore	Pts: Mickeal 12; Rebs: N'Dong 14; Asts: Trias 5 PIR: N'Dong 23	Arena: Palacio de Deportes; Attendance: 5,000; Referees: Francisco De la Maza, Santi Fernández, Luis Miguel Castillo

29 April 2010 33	Regal FC Barcelona	86–55	Bizkaia Bilbao Basket	Barcelona
20:45	Scoring by quarter: 13–11, 19–18, 28–16, 26–10
	Pts: Basile 15; Rebs: Morris 7 Asts: Rubio 7 PIR: N'Dong 19	Boxscore	Pts: Mumbrú 16; Rebs: Hervelle 6 Asts: three players 2 PIR: Moïso 17	Arena: Palau Blaugrana; Attendance: 3,452; Referees: José Ramón García Ortiz, Óscar Perea, Francisco Zafra
Note: The game, originally scheduled for May, was pushed forward in the calendar due to Barcelona's participation in the 2010 EuroLeague Final Four.

15 May 2010 34	Meridiano Alicante	68–85	Regal FC Barcelona	Alacant
20:45	Scoring by quarter: 16–25, 24–16, 17–18, 11–26
	Pts: Katelynas 15; Rebs: Katelynas 8 Asts: Urtasun 5 PIR: Katelynas 16	Boxscore	Pts: Navarro 22; Rebs: three players 6 Asts: Rubio 7 PIR: Navarro, N'Dong 20	Arena: Centro de Tecnificación; Attendance: 4,820; Referees: Michael Bobiak, Mark Lewis, Duskaj Medin

=== ACB Playoffs ===
==== Quarterfinals ====
21 May 2010 1	Regal FC Barcelona	85–53	Gran Canaria 2014	Barcelona
21:00	Scoring by quarter: 14–10, 25–8, 24–23, 22–12
	Pts: Mickeal 17; Rebs: Vázquez, Mickeal 5 Asts: Rubio, Lakovič 5 PIR: Morris 23	Boxscore	Pts: McDonald 21; Rebs: Augustine 7 Asts: Moran 3 PIR: McDonald 20	Arena: Palau Blaugrana; Attendance: 5,506; Referees: Francisco De la Maza, José Ramón García Ortiz, Carlos Cortés

23 May 2010 2	Gran Canaria 2014	47–65	Regal FC Barcelona	Las Palmas
12:30	Scoring by quarter: 4–18, 15–13, 12–18, 16-16
	Pts: Caroll 11; Rebs: Savané 8 Asts: Bellas, Norris, Caroll 2 PIR: Savané 17	Boxscore	Pts: Navarro 16; Rebs: Morris 7 Asts: Rubio 6 PIR: Morris 15	Arena: Centro Insular de Deportes; Attendance: 4,932; Referees: Daniel Hierrezuelo, José Javier Murgui, Carlos Peruga

==== Semifinals ====
27 May 2010 1	Regal FC Barcelona	96–82	Unicaja	Barcelona
20:30	Scoring by quarter: 21–24, 23–24, 35–21, 17–13
	Pts: Navarro 24; Rebs: Morris 9 Asts: Rubio 8 PIR: Morris 29	Boxscore	Pts: Neal 19; Rebs: Freeland 8 Asts: Welsch 5 PIR: Dowdell, Freeland 20	Arena: Palau Blaugrana; Attendance: 5,477; Referees: Juan Carlos Mitjana, Daniel Hierrezuelo, José Javier Murgui

29 May 2010 2	Regal FC Barcelona	71–58	Unicaja	Barcelona
20:00	Scoring by quarter: 12–13, 28–10, 16–23, 15–12
	Pts: Navarro 16; Rebs: Morris 12; Asts: Navarro 5 PIR: Vázquez 20	Boxscore	Pts: Freeland 11; Rebs: Printezis 7 Asts: Dowdell 3 PIR: Archibald 11	Arena: Palau Blaugrana; Attendance: 6,510; Referees: Francisco De la Maza, Miguel Ángel Pérez Pérez, Juan Luis Redondo

1 June 2010 3	Unicaja	72–82	Regal FC Barcelona	Málaga
20:30	Scoring by quarter: 21–20, 19–15, 19–22, 13–25
	Pts: Neal 18; Rebs: Archibald 6 Asts: Cook 5 PIR: Cook 14	Boxscore	Pts: Basile 20; Rebs: Vázquez 10; Asts: Rubio, Mickeal 2 PIR: Lorbek, Mickeal 20	Arena: Martín Carpena; Attendance: 10,000; Referees: José Antonio Martín Bertrán, Antonio Conde, Vicente Bultó

==== Finals ====
10 June 2010 1	Regal FC Barcelona	58–63	Caja Laboral	Barcelona
20:30	Scoring by quarter: 16–22, 16–12, 16–11, 10–18
	Pts: Navarro 17; Rebs: Lorbek 8 Asts: Lorbek 4 PIR: N'Dong 20	Boxscore	Pts: Splitter 16; Rebs: San Emeterio 9 Asts: Huertas 3 PIR: San Emeterio 18	Arena: Palau Blaugrana; Attendance: 7,235; Referees: Juan Carlos Arteaga, José Ramón García Ortiz, Juan Luis Redondo

12 June 2010 2	Regal FC Barcelona	69–70	Caja Laboral	Barcelona
18:00	Scoring by quarter: 19–17, 19–16, 15–14, 16–23
	Pts: Mickeal 18; Rebs: Morris 8 Asts: Lorbek 3 PIR: Mickeal 17	Boxscore	Pts: San Emeterio 19; Rebs: Splitter 6 Asts: Huertas 3 PIR: San Emeterio 18	Arena: Palau Blaugrana; Attendance: 7,235; Referees: Francisco De la Maza, José Antonio Martín Bertrán, Antonio Conde

15 June 2010 3	Caja Laboral	79–78(OT)	Regal FC Barcelona	Vitoria-Gasteiz
20:30	Scoring by quarter: 22–18, 19–18, 11–17, 14–13, Overtime: 13–12
	Pts: Eliyahu 18; Rebs: Splitter 13; Asts: Splitter 4 PIR: Splitter 46	Boxscore	Pts: Navarro 18; Rebs: Morris 9 Asts: Rubio 4 PIR: Rubio 21	Arena: Fernando Buesa Arena; Attendance: 9,700; Referees: Daniel Hierrezuelo, Emilio Pérez Pizarro, Benjamín Jiménez

=== EuroLeague ===
==== Results summary ====
Overall						Home					Away				
Pld	W	L	PF	PA	PD	W	L	PF	PA	PD	W	L	PF	PA	PD
16	15	1	1298	1021	+277	8	0	664	505	+159	7	1	634	516	+118

Last updated: 10 April 2025.
Source: Competitive matches

==== Group phase ====
	Team	Pld	W	L	PF	PA	Diff
1.	(Spain) Regal FC Barcelona	10	10	0	833	625	+208
2.	(Italy) Montepaschi Siena	10	8	2	830	689	+141
3.	(Lithuania) Žalgiris	10	3	7	673	739	−66
4.	(Croatia) Cibona VIP	10	3	7	637	742	−105
5.	(France) ASVEL	10	3	7	680	749	−69
6.	(Turkey) Fenerbahçe Ülker	10	3	7	690	799	−109

==== Matches ====
21 October 2009 1	Fenerbahçe Ülker İstanbul (Turkey)	59–82	(Spain) Regal FC Barcelona	Istanbul
18:45	Scoring by quarter: 11-19, 10-19, 17-24, 21-20
	Pts: Solomon 16; Rebs: Erden, Aşık, Preldžič 3 Asts: Giriček, Greer, Savaş 2 PIR: Savaş 12	Boxscore	Pts: Mickeal 26; Rebs: Vázquez, Morris, Mickeal 7 Asts: Rubio 9 PIR: Mickeal 32	Arena: Abdi İpekçi Arena; Attendance: 5,730; Referees: Luigi Lamonica, Milivoje Jovčić, Sergiy Zashchuck

29 October 2009 2	Regal FC Barcelona (Spain)	81–59	(Croatia) Cibona Zagreb	Barcelona
20:45	Scoring by quarter: 16-13, 23-14, 25-14, 17-18
	Pts: Navarro 20; Rebs: four players 4 Asts: Rubio 5 PIR: Morris 21	Boxscore	Pts: Tomas 16; Rebs: Rozić 6 Asts: Gordon 4 PIR: Tomas 14	Arena: Palau Blaugrana; Attendance: 4,539; Referees: Guerrino Cerebuch, Christos Christodoulou, David Chambon

5 November 2009 3	Žalgiris Kaunas (Lithuania)	70–77	(Spain) Regal FC Barcelona	Kaunas
18:45	Scoring by quarter: 21-23, 17-18, 15-22, 17-14
	Pts: Begić 20; Rebs: Watson 10; Asts: Kalnietis 6 PIR: Begić 23	Boxscore	Pts: Mickeal 22; Rebs: Rubio 6 Asts: Rubio 5 PIR: Mickeal 20	Arena: S. Darius and S. Girėnas Hall; Attendance: 5,000; Referees: Grzegorz Ziemblicki, Gianpaolo Cicoria, Boris Shulga

11 November 2009 4	Regal FC Barcelona (Spain)	76–62	(France) ASVEL Villeurbanne	Barcelona
20:45	Scoring by quarter: 19-22, 22-17, 17-14, 18-9
	Pts: Mickeal 16; Rebs: Grimau 6 Asts: Rubio 3 PIR: Mickeal 21	Boxscore	Pts: Traoré 20; Rebs: Traoré 8 Asts: Lukauskis, Dixon 4 PIR: Traoré 19	Arena: Palau Blaugrana; Attendance: 4,021; Referees: Sreten Radović, Roberto Chiari, Marko Juras

26 November 2009 5	Montepaschi Siena (Italy)	65–84	(Spain) Regal FC Barcelona	Siena
20:30	Scoring by quarter: 18-20, 16-23, 19-18, 12-23
	Pts: McIntyre, Sato 13; Rebs: Stonerook 7 Asts: Stonerook 2 PIR: Sato 16	Boxscore	Pts: N'Dong 19; Rebs: Mickeal 7 Asts: Rubio, Navarro, Lorbek 5 PIR: Mickeal 22	Arena: Palasport Mens Sana; Attendance: 5,044; Referees: Romualdas Brazauskas, Eddie Viator, Milija Vojinovic

3 December 2009 6	Regal FC Barcelona (Spain)	89–55	(Turkey) Fenerbahçe Ülker İstanbul	Barcelona
20:45	Scoring by quarter: 15-6, 27-15, 25-15, 22-19
	Pts: Lakovič, Vázquez 14; Rebs: Morris 7 Asts: Navarro 5 PIR: Morris 19	Boxscore	Pts: Greer 13; Rebs: Aşık 7 Asts: Başak, Aşık 2 PIR: Aşık 16	Arena: Palau Blaugrana; Attendance: 4,227; Referees: Zoran Šutulović, Borys Ryzhyk, Oļegs Latiševs

10 December 2009 7	Cibona Zagreb (Croatia)	66–80	(Spain) Regal FC Barcelona	Zagreb
18:30	Scoring by quarter: 19-26, 15-19, 19-20, 13-15
	Pts: Gordon 19; Rebs: Gordon 7 Asts: Tomas 6 PIR: Gordon 10	Boxscore	Pts: Navarro 20; Rebs: Morris 9 Asts: Rubio, Navarro 5 PIR: Vázquez 30	Arena: Dražen Petrović Basketball Hall; Attendance: 5,200; Referees: Christos Christodoulou, Tolga Sahin, Gianluca Mattioli

17 December 2009 8	Regal FC Barcelona (Spain)	89–55	(Lithuania) Žalgiris Kaunas	Barcelona
20:45	Scoring by quarter: 20–17, 26–11, 23–9, 20–18
	Pts: Mickeal 14; Rebs: Lorbek 7 Asts: Sada 4 PIR: Grimau 17	Boxscore	Pts: Watson 17; Rebs: Watson 14; Asts: six players 1 PIR: Watson 24	Arena: Palau Blaugrana; Attendance: 3,522; Referees: Shmuel Bachar, Costas Mouzakis, Siniša Herceg

7 January 2010 9	ASVEL Villeurbanne (France)	64–90	(Spain) Regal FC Barcelona	Villeurbanne
20:30	Scoring by quarter: 15-22, 19-23, 20-20, 10-25
	Pts: Traoré 19; Rebs: Samnick 8 Asts: Dixon 4 PIR: Traoré 16	Boxscore	Pts: Navarro 15; Rebs: Vázquez 7 Asts: Rubio 7 PIR: Morris 18	Arena: Astroballe; Attendance: 5,602; Referees: Dubravko Muhvić, Recep Ankarali, Carmelo Paternico

14 January 2010 10	Regal FC Barcelona (Spain)	85–70	(Italy) Montepaschi Siena	Barcelona
20:00	Scoring by quarter: 22-15, 18-20, 20-14, 25-21
	Pts: Rubio 14; Rebs: Mickeal 9 Asts: Rubio 10; PIR: Rubio 33	Boxscore	Pts: Hawkins 19; Rebs: Lavrinovič 8 Asts: McIntyre, Zisis 3 PIR: McIntyre 13	Arena: Palau Blaugrana; Attendance: 6,123; Referees: Carl Jungebrand, Fernando Rocha, Marek Ćmikiewicz

=== Top 16 ===
==== Group E ====
	Team	Pld	W	L	PF	PA	Diff
1.	(Spain) Regal FC Barcelona	6	5	1	465	396	+69
2.	(Serbia) Partizan	6	3	3	389	422	−33
3.	(Greece) Panathinaikos	6	2	4	439	442	−3
4.	(Greece) Maroussi	6	2	4	419	452	−33

==== Matches ====
28 January 2010 1	Regal FC Barcelona (Spain)	79–69	(Greece) Maroussi Athens	Barcelona
20:45	Scoring by quarter: 19-5, 22-22, 16-20, 22-22
	Pts: Navarro 17; Rebs: N'Dong 12; Asts: Navarro 8 PIR: Navarro 25	Boxscore	Pts: Gordon 24; Rebs: Mavroeidis 6 Asts: Batis 4 PIR: Gordon 24	Arena: Palau Blaugrana; Attendance: 4,139; Referees: Recep Ankaralı, Roberto Chiari, Tomas Jasevičius

3 February 2010 2	Partizan (Serbia)	67–66(OT)	(Spain) Regal FC Barcelona	Belgrade
20:45	Scoring by quarter: 23-12, 12-12, 8-23, 18-14, Overtime: 6-5
	Pts: Veselý 13; Rebs: Veselý 15; Asts: Rašić 6 PIR: Veselý 27	Boxscore	Pts: Lakovič 14; Rebs: Basile 6 Asts: Rubio 5 PIR: Lakovič 17	Arena: Pionir Hall; Attendance: 8,125; Referees: Luigi Lamonica, Jakub Zamojski, Sergey Mikhaylov

11 February 2010 3	Regal FC Barcelona (Spain)	83–71	(Greece) Panathinaikos	Barcelona
20:45	Scoring by quarter: 29-18, 18-20, 21-16, 15-17
	Pts: Grimau 17; Rebs: Grimau 6 Asts: Navarro 5 PIR: Grimau 24	Boxscore	Pts: Batiste 19; Rebs: Batiste 7 Asts: Nicholas 5 PIR: Batiste 21	Arena: Palau Blaugrana; Attendance: 7,093; Referees: Guerrino Cerebuch, Gianpaolo Cicoria, David Chambon

25 February 2010 4	Panathinaikos (Greece)	67–70	(Spain) Regal FC Barcelona	Marousi
21:00	Scoring by quarter: 20-16, 17-17, 18-11, 12-26
	Pts: Peković 20; Rebs: Batiste, Fotsis 6 Asts: Diamantidis, Nicholas 5 PIR: Peković 17	Boxscore	Pts: Navarro 15; Rebs: Lorbek 10; Asts: Lakovič 5 PIR: Lorbek 22	Arena: Olympic Indoor Hall; Attendance: 12,000; Referees: Romualdas Brazkauskas, Paolo Taurino, Oļegs Latiševs

3 March 2010 5	Maroussi Athens (Greece)	58–85	(Spain) Regal FC Barcelona	Marousi
19:15	Scoring by quarter: 20-18, 15-24, 3-17, 20-26
	Pts: Keys 12; Rebs: Lucas 8 Asts: Pelekanos, Lucas 3 PIR: Keys 11	Boxscore	Pts: Lorbek 14; Rebs: Mickeal 10; Asts: Lakovič 4 PIR: Morris 20	Arena: Olympic Indoor Hall; Attendance: 5,800; Referees: Shmuel Bachar, Zoran Sutulović, Tolga Sahin

11 March 2010 6	Regal FC Barcelona (Spain)	82–64	(Serbia) Partizan	Barcelona
20:45	Scoring by quarter: 22–16, 14–14, 25–12, 21–22
	Pts: Navarro 18; Rebs: Mickeal 7 Asts: Rubio 6 PIR: Navarro 20	Boxscore	Pts: Roberts 14; Rebs: Marić 14; Asts: Rašić 5 PIR: Marić 20	Arena: Palau Blaugrana; Attendance: 6,953; Referees: Christos Christodoulou, Robert Lottermoser, Panagiotis Anastopoulos

=== EuroLeague Quarterfinals ===
==== Quarterfinal 1 ====
23 March 2010 Game 1	Regal FC Barcelona (Spain)	68–61	(Spain) Real Madrid	Barcelona
20:45	Scoring by quarter: 19–17, 18–19, 14–15, 17–10
	Pts: Mickeal 18; Rebs: N'Dong 7 Asts: Rubio, Navarro 3 PIR: Mickeal 23	Report	Pts: Lavrinovič 14; Rebs: Lavrinovič 8 Asts: Prigioni 8 PIR: Lavrinovič 17	Arena: Palau Blaugrana; Attendance: 7,428; Referees: Shmuel Bachar, Ilija Belošević, Eddie Viator

25 March 2010 Game 2	Regal FC Barcelona (Spain)	63–70	(Spain) Real Madrid	Barcelona
20:15	Scoring by quarter: 8–15, 19–17, 13–18, 23–20
	Pts: Mickeal 13; Rebs: Lorbek 7 Asts: Navarro 3 PIR: Vázquez 17	Report	Pts: Tomić 22; Rebs: Jarić 6 Asts: Prigioni 4 PIR: Tomić 26	Arena: Palau Blaugrana; Attendance: 7,585; Referees: Romualdas Brazauskas, Dani Hierrezuelo, Spiros Gkontas

30 March 2010 Game 3	Real Madrid (Spain)	73–84	(Spain) Regal FC Barcelona	Madrid
21:25	Scoring by quarter: 14-25, 17-21, 19-15, 23-23
	Pts: Tomić 23; Rebs: Jarić 4 Asts: Jarić 4 PIR: Tomić 23	Report	Pts: Navarro 24; Rebs: Rubio, Mickeal 5 Asts: Lakovič 3 PIR: Navarro 29	Arena: Palacio Vistalegre; Attendance: 13,500; Referees: Carl Jungebrand, Milivoje Jovčić, Emilio Pérez Pizarro

1 April 2010 Game 4	Real Madrid (Spain)	78–84	(Spain) Regal FC Barcelona	Madrid
19:00	Scoring by quarter: 19-20, 22-25, 21-20, 16-19
	Pts: Llull 20; Rebs: Veličković 6 Asts: Prigioni, Hansen 4 PIR: Reyes 24	Report	Pts: Navarro 21; Rebs: Vázquez 7 Asts: Navarro 3 PIR: Navarro 13	Arena: Palacio Vistalegre; Attendance: 13,700; Referees: Lazaros Voreadis, Christos Christodoulou, Jakub Zamojski

=== EuroLeague Final Four ===
7 May 2010 Semifinal	Regal FC Barcelona (Spain)	64–54	(Russia) CSKA Moscow	Paris
18:00	Scoring by quarter: 12–11, 17–10, 18–20, 17–13
	Pts: Vázquez 11; Rebs: Lorbek 9 Asts: Rubio 8 PIR: Rubio 19	Report	Pts: Šiškauskas 19; Rebs: Kaun 10; Asts: Šiškauskas 5 PIR: Šiškauskas 19	Arena: Palais Omnisports de Paris-Bercy; Attendance: 14,768; Referees: Romualdas Brazauskas, Christos Christodoulou, David Chambon, Olegs Latisevs

9 May 2010 Final	Regal FC Barcelona (Spain)	86–68	(Greece) Olympiacos	Paris
16:00	Scoring by quarter: 28–19, 19–17, 17–14, 22–18
	Pts: Navarro 21; Rebs: Mickeal, Navarro 5 Asts: Navarro, Sada 3 PIR: Navarro 23	Boxscore	Pts: Childress 15; Rebs: Childress 6 Asts: Papaloukas, Teodosić 3 PIR: Childress 15	Arena: Palais Omnisports de Paris-Bercy; Attendance: 14,768; Referees: Romualdas Brazauskas, Shmuel Bachar, David Chambon, Matej Boltauzer

=== Copa del Rey ===
==== Quarterfinals ====
18 February 2010	Regal FC Barcelona	77–72	Cajasol	Barakaldo
21:35	Scoring by quarter: 20–24, 17–13, 22–12, 18–23
	Pts: Navarro 15; Rebs: Mickeal 7 Asts: Rubio 7 PIR: Mickeal 15	Boxscore	Pts: Kirksay 15; Rebs: Kirksay 10; Asts: Calloway 5 PIR: Kirksay 19	Arena: Bizkaia Arena; Attendance: 12,834; Referees: Francisco De la Maza, Juan Luis Redondo, Juan Carlos García González

==== Semifinals ====
20 February 2010	Power Electronics Valencia	64–72	Regal FC Barcelona	Barakaldo
18:00	Scoring by quarter: 13–22, 19–13, 17–20, 15–17
	Pts: Nielsen 19; Rebs: three players 4 Asts: Nielsen 2 PIR: Nielsen 22	Boxscore	Pts: Vázquez 16; Rebs: N'Dong 9 Asts: Rubio 4 PIR: Vázquez 21	Arena: Bizkaia Arena; Attendance: 13,916; Referees: Daniel Hierrezuelo, Pérez Pizarro, Redondo

==== Final ====
21 February 2010	Regal FC Barcelona	80–61	Real Madrid	Barakaldo
19:00	Scoring by quarter: 19–16, 21–9, 24–12, 16–24
	Pts: Vázquez 14; Rebs: Lorbek, Mickeal 6 Asts: Sada 4 PIR: Vázquez 18	Boxscore	Pts: Lavrinovič, Veličković 11; Rebs: Reyes 9 Asts: Jarić, Prigioni 4 PIR: Veličković 11	Arena: Bizkaia Arena; Attendance: 14,814; Referees: Juan Carlos Arteaga, Emilio Pérez Pizarro, Juan Carlos García González

=== Supercopa de España ===
==== Semifinals ====
2 October 2009	Gran Canaria 2014	51–74	Regal FC Barcelona	Las Palmas
19:30	Scoring by quarter: 13–15, 13–24, 15–19, 10–16
	Pts: McDonald 12; Rebs: Augustine 10; Asts: Fisher 2 PIR: Augustine, McDonald 13	Boxscore	Pts: N'Dong 13; Rebs: N'Dong 6 Asts: Ricky, Navarro 6 PIR: N'Dong 16	Arena: Centro Insular de Deportes; Attendance: 4,200; Referees: Francisco De la Maza, Miguel Ángel Pérez Pérez, Antonio Conde

==== Final ====
3 October 2009	Regal FC Barcelona	86–82	Real Madrid	Las Palmas
19:00	Scoring by quarter: 29–27, 17–22, 20–22, 20–11
	Pts: Navarro 22; Rebs: Lorbek 7 Asts: Navarro 5 PIR: Navarro 25	Boxscore	Pts: Garbajosa 17; Rebs: Veličković 8 Asts: Bullock 3 PIR: Garbajosa 15	Arena: Centro Insular de Deportes; Attendance: 4,600; Referees: Juan Carlos Arteaga, Emilio Pérez Pizarro, Antonio Conde

== Individual awards ==
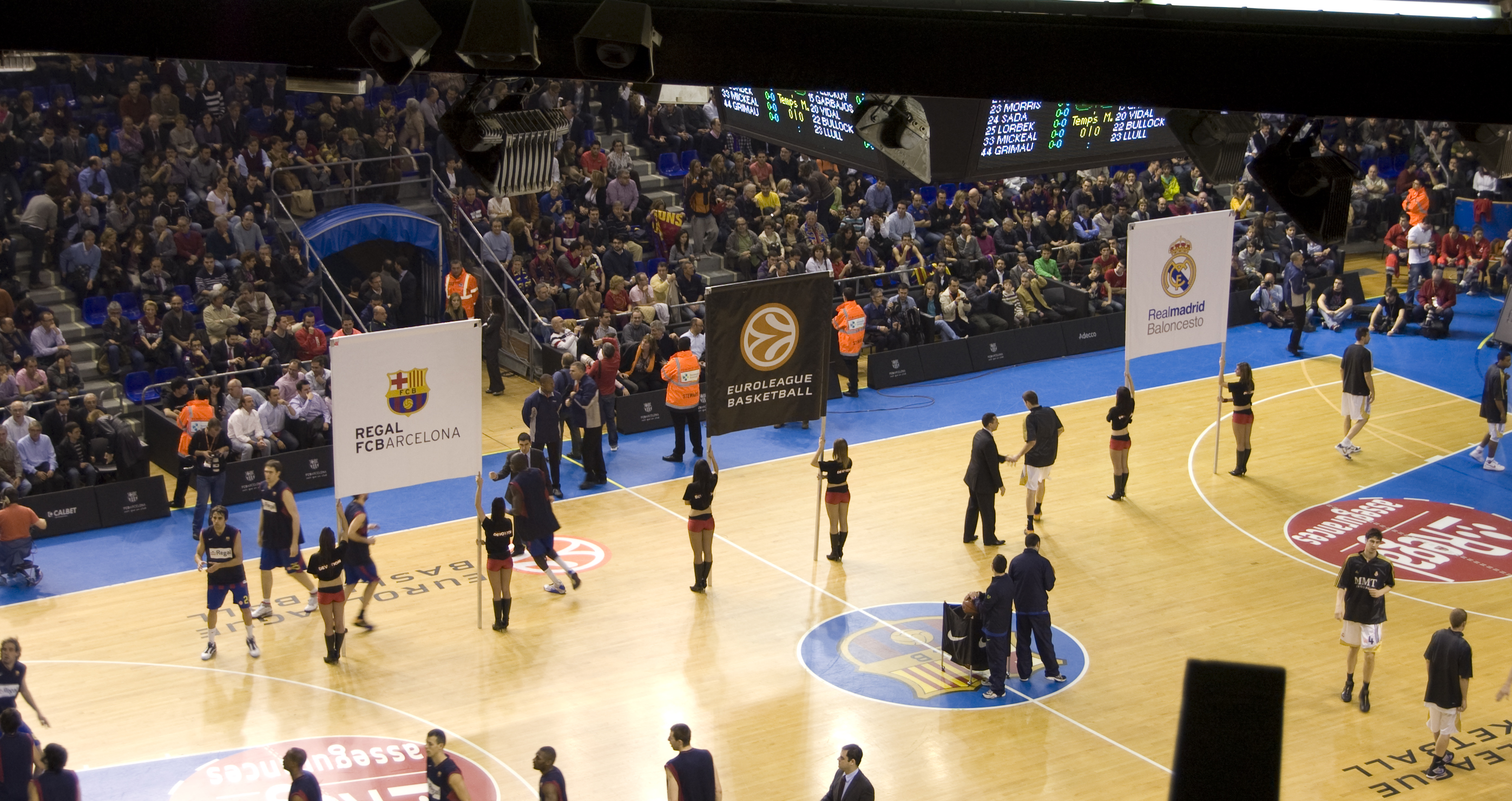
Palau Blaugrana before the start of a Clàssic in March 2010

=== Supercopa ===
Finals MVP

- (Spain) Juan Carlos Navarro

=== Copa del Rey ===
Finals MVP

- (Spain) Fran Vázquez

=== Liga ACB ===
All-Liga ACB Team

- (Spain) Ricky Rubio
- (Spain) Juan Carlos Navarro
- (Slovenia) Erazem Lorbek

ACB Most Spectacular Player

- (Spain) Ricky Rubio

Player of the Round

- (Spain) Juan Carlos Navarro – Round 28

=== EuroLeague ===
EuroLeague Final Four MVP

- (Spain) Juan Carlos Navarro

All-EuroLeague First Team

- (Spain) Juan Carlos Navarro

All-EuroLeague Second Team

- (Slovenia) Erazem Lorbek

Rising Star

- (Spain) Ricky Rubio

MVP of the Round

- (Spain) Ricky Rubio – Round 10
- (Spain) Juan Carlos Navarro – Game 3 of the Quarterfinals

MVP of the Month

- (United States) Pete Mickeal – November
- (Spain) Juan Carlos Navarro – April
