= 2009–10 Euroleague Quarterfinals =

Results for Quarterfinals of the 2009–10 Euroleague basketball tournament.

The quarterfinals will be played from March 23 to April 7, 2010. Team #1 (i.e., the group winner in each series) will host Games 1 and 2, plus Game 5 if necessary. Team #2 will host Game 3, plus Game 4 if necessary.

== Bracket ==
	Team #1	Agg.	Team #2	Game 1	Game 2	Game 3	Game 4	Game 5
1.	Regal FC Barcelona (Spain)	3 – 1	(Spain) Real Madrid	68 – 61	63 – 70	84 – 73	84 – 78	–
2.	Maccabi Tel Aviv (Israel)	1 – 3	(Serbia) Partizan Belgrade	77 – 85	98 – 78	73 – 81	66 – 76	–
3.	CSKA Moscow (Russia)	3 – 1	(Spain) Caja Laboral Baskonia	86 – 63	83 – 63	53 – 66	74 – 70	–
4.	Olympiacos Piraeus (Greece)	3 – 1	(Poland) Asseco Prokom Gdynia	83 – 79	90 – 73	78 – 81	86 – 70	–

== Quarterfinals ==
=== Quarterfinal 1 ===
Game 1

23 March 2010
20:45

Report

Regal FC Barcelona (Spain)	68–61	(Spain) Real Madrid
Scoring by quarter: 19–17, 18–19, 14–15, 17–10
Pts: Mickeal 18; Rebs: N'Dong 7 Asts: Rubio, Navarro 3		Pts: Lavrinovič 14; Rebs: Lavrinovič 8 Asts: Prigioni 8

Palau Blaugrana
Attendance: 7,428
Referees: Shmuel Bachar (ISR), Ilija Belošević (SRB), Eddie Viator (FRA)

Game 2

25 March 2010
20:15

Report

Regal FC Barcelona (Spain)	63–70	(Spain) Real Madrid
Scoring by quarter: 8–15, 19–17, 13–18, 23–20
Pts: Mickeal 13; Rebs: Lorbek 7 Asts: Navarro 3		Pts: Tomić 22; Rebs: Jarić 6 Asts: Prigioni 4

Palau Blaugrana
Attendance: 7,585
Referees: Romualdas Brazauskas (LTU), Dani Hierrezuelo (ESP), Spiros Gkontas (GRE)

Game 3

30 March 2010
21:25

Report

Real Madrid (Spain)	73–84	(Spain) Regal FC Barcelona
Scoring by quarter: 14-25, 17-21, 19-15, 23-23
Pts: Tomić 23; Rebs: Jarić 4 Asts: Jarić 4		Pts: Navarro 24; Rebs: Rubio, Mickeal 5 Asts: Lakovič 3

Palacio Vistalegre
Attendance: 13,500
Referees: Carl Jungebrand (FIN), Milivoje Jovčić (SRB), Emilio Pérez Pizarro (ESP)

Game 4

1 April 2010
19:00

Report

Real Madrid (Spain)	78–84	(Spain) Regal FC Barcelona
Scoring by quarter: 19-20, 22-25, 21-20, 16-19
Pts: Llull 20; Rebs: Veličković 6 Asts: Prigioni, Hansen 4		Pts: Navarro 21; Rebs: Vázquez 7 Asts: Navarro 3

Palacio Vistalegre
Attendance: 13,700
Referees: Lazaros Voreadis (GRE), Christos Christodoulou (GRE), Jakub Zamojski (POL)

=== Quarterfinal 2 ===
Game 1

23 March 2010
20:00

Report

Maccabi Tel Aviv (Israel)	77–85	(Serbia) Partizan Belgrade
Scoring by quarter: 27–12, 19–20, 20–26, 11–27
Pts: Perkins 13; Rebs: Fischer 7 Asts: Perkins 6		Pts: Kecman 29; Rebs: McCalebb 10; Asts: McCalebb 6

Nokia Arena
Attendance: 11,500
Referees: José Martín (ESP), Borys Ryzhyk (UKR), Recep Ankaralı (TUR)

Game 2

25 March 2010
20:00

Report

Maccabi Tel Aviv (Israel)	98–78	(Serbia) Partizan Belgrade
Scoring by quarter: 26–24, 28–15, 19-19, 25–20
Pts: Wisniewski, Bluthenthal 17; Rebs: Fischer 6 Asts: Anderson 5		Pts: Marić 16; Rebs: Roberts 7 Asts: McCalebb 5

Nokia Arena
Attendance: 11,500
Referees: Luigi Lamonica (ITA), Dubravko Muhvić (CRO), Elias Koromilas (GRE)

Game 3

30 March 2010
20:45

Report

Partizan Belgrade (Serbia)	81–73	(Israel) Maccabi Tel Aviv
Scoring by quarter: 26-17, 21-17, 17-16, 17-23
Pts: McCalebb 18; Rebs: Roberts, McCalebb, Marić, Vraneš 7 Asts: Roberts 3		Pts: Anderson 13; Rebs: Perkins, Eidson 7 Asts: Eidson 5

Belgrade Arena
Attendance: 20,783
Referees: Fabio Facchini (ITA), Guerrino Cerebuch (ITA), Srđan Dožai (CRO)

Game 4

1 April 2010
20:45

Report

Partizan Belgrade (Serbia)	76–67	(Israel) Maccabi Tel Aviv
Scoring by quarter: 18-16, 20-19, 17-17, 21-15
Pts: McCalebb 19; Rebs: Roberts 12; Asts: Kecman 4		Pts: Wisniewski 15; Rebs: Perkins 8 Asts: Wisniewski, Anderson, Fischer 2

Belgrade Arena
Attendance: 21,367
Referees: Juan Carlos Mitjana (ESP), Paolo Taurino (ITA), Marek Cmikiewicz (POL)

=== Quarterfinal 3 ===
Game 1

23 March 2010
18:15

Report

CSKA Moscow (Russia)	86–63	(Spain) Caja Laboral Baskonia
Scoring by quarter: 24–19, 25–10, 21–15, 16–19
Pts: Vorontsevich 15; Rebs: Vorontsevich, Planinić 7 Asts: Planinić 7		Pts: Teletović, San Emeterio 11; Rebs: Herrmann 6 Asts: Singletary 4

CSKA Universal Sports Hall
Attendance: 3,900
Referees: Lazaros Voreadis (GRE), Christos Christodoulou (GRE), Olegs Latisevs (LAT)

Game 2

25 March 2010
18:15

Report

CSKA Moscow (Russia)	83–63	(Spain) Caja Laboral Baskonia
Scoring by quarter: 19–18, 16–12, 24–11, 24–22
Pts: Šiškauskas, Khryapa 14; Rebs: Kaun 8 Asts: Šiškauskas, Planinić 4		Pts: Teletović, Splitter 11; Rebs: Teletović, San Emeterio 5 Asts: Singletary, San Emeterio 4

CSKA Universal Sports Hall
Attendance: 4,500
Referees: Carl Jungebrand (FIN), Saša Pukl (SLO), David Chambon (FRA)

Game 3

30 March 2010
19:30

Report

Caja Laboral Baskonia (Spain)	66–53	(Russia) CSKA Moscow
Scoring by quarter: 16–12, 15–12, 11–17, 24–12
Pts: Splitter 15; Rebs: Splitter 7 Asts: Singletary 4		Pts: Khryapa 9 Rebs: Šiškauskas 7 Asts: Khryapa 3

Fernando Buesa Arena
Attendance: 9,500
Referees: Romualdas Brazauskas (LTU), Ilija Belosevic (SRB), Panagiotis Anastopoulos (GRE)

Game 4

1 April 2010
20:30

Report

Caja Laboral Baskonia (Spain)	70–74	(Russia) CSKA Moscow
Scoring by quarter: 11-22, 27-8, 15-15, 17-29
Pts: San Emeterio 23; Rebs: San Emeterio 9 Asts: Huertas 7		Pts: Holden 19; Rebs: Kaun 10; Asts: Šiškauskas, Holden 4

Fernando Buesa Arena
Attendance: 9,300
Referees: Shmuel Bachar (ISR), Volodymr Drabikovsky (UKR), Roberto Chiari (ITA)

=== Quarterfinal 4 ===
Game 1

23 March 2010
21:00

Report

Olympiacos Piraeus (Greece)	83–79	(Poland) Asseco Prokom Gdynia
Scoring by quarter: 18–19, 17–20, 25–15, 23–25
Pts: Kleiza 26; Rebs: Bourousis, Kleiza 6 Asts: Teodosić 6		Pts: Woods 23; Rebs: Woods 11; Asts: Harrington 5

Peace and Friendship Stadium
Attendance: 8,700
Referees: Juan Carlos Arteaga (ESP), Juan Carlos García González (ESP), Sreten Radović (CRO)

Game 2

25 March 2010
20:00

Report

Olympiacos Piraeus (Greece)	90–73	(Poland) Asseco Prokom Gdynia
Scoring by quarter: 25–14, 21–24, 16–20, 28–15
Pts: Kleiza 26; Rebs: Kleiza 9 Asts: Teodosić 12		Pts: Woods 20; Rebs: Woods 14; Asts: Logan 4

Peace and Friendship Stadium
Attendance: 9,200
Referees: Fabio Facchini (ITA), Fernando Rocha (POR), Robert Lottermoser (GER)

Game 3

30 March 2010
19:45

Report

Asseco Prokom Gdynia (Poland)	81–78	(Greece) Olympiacos Piraeus
Scoring by quarter: 22–18, 23–16, 19–24, 17–21
Pts: Woods, Ewing 18; Rebs: Jagla 9 Asts: Woods 4		Pts: Childress 20; Rebs: Childress 5 Asts: Teodosić 9

Gdynia Sports Arena
Attendance: 5,000
Referees: Luigi Lamonica(ITA), José Martín (ESP), Tolga Sahin(ITA)

Game 4

1 April 2010
19:45

Report

Asseco Prokom Gdynia (Poland)	70–86	(Greece) Olympiacos Piraeus
Scoring by quarter: 20-28, 12-22, 16-16, 22-20
Pts: Logan 18; Rebs: Jagla 6 Asts: Logan 3		Pts: Childress 22; Rebs: Schortsanitis, Teodosić 7 Asts: Teodosić 5

Gdynia Sports Arena
Attendance: 4,900
Referees: Matej Boltauzer (SLO), Dani Hierrezuelo (ESP), Eddie Viator (FRA)
