= 2010 Euroleague Final Four =

Basketball tournament

- Season: 2009–10 Euroleague

Tournament details
- Arena: Paris-Bercy; Paris, France
- Dates: May 7 – May 9, 2010

Final positions
- Champions: (Spain) FC Barcelona (2nd title)
- Runners-up: (Greece) Olympiacos
- Third place: (Russia) CSKA Moscow
- Fourth place: (Serbia) Partizan

Awards and statistics
- MVP: (Spain) Juan Carlos Navarro

The 2010 Euroleague Final Four was the concluding EuroLeague Final Four tournament that determined the winner of the 2009–10 Euroleague season. It was held at the Palais Omnisports de Paris-Bercy, Paris, France on May 7 and 9, 2010. The contestants were four former EuroLeague champions, and three of the previous year's EuroLeague Final Four teams CSKA Moscow, Olympiacos, Regal FC Barcelona, plus new entry Partizan Belgrade. Barcelona won their second EuroLeague crown, beating Olympiacos 86–68, in the final.

== Venue ==
The Palais Omnisports de Paris-Bercy, often abbreviated as POPB or Bercy, is an indoor sports arena in the 12th arrondissement of Paris, France. Opened in 1984, and with a seating capacity of 15,603, it had hosted three EuroLeague Final Fours before 2010, in 1991, 1996, and 2000.

== Bracket ==
Semifinals; May 7
(Spain) Regal FC Barcelona	64
(Russia) CSKA Moscow	54
(Serbia) Partizan	80
(Greece) Olympiacos	83

Final; May 9
(Spain) Regal FC Barcelona	86
(Greece) Olympiacos	68
Third place
(Russia) CSKA Moscow	90
(Serbia) Partizan	88

== Semifinals ==
All times are in Central European Summer Time.

=== Semifinal 1 ===
7 May 2010
18:00

Report

Regal FC Barcelona (Spain)	64–54	(Russia) CSKA Moscow
Scoring by quarter: 12–11, 17–10, 18–20, 17–13
Pts: Vázquez 11; Rebs: Lorbek 9 Asts: Rubio 8		Pts: Šiškauskas 19; Rebs: Kaun 10; Asts: Šiškauskas 5

Palais Omnisports de Paris-Bercy, Paris
Attendance: 14,768
Referees: Romualdas Brazauskas (LTU), Christos Christodoulou (GRE), David Chambon (FRA), Olegs Latisevs (LAT)

=== Semifinal 2 ===
7 May 2010
21:00

Report

KK Partizan (Serbia)	80–83 (OT)	(Greece) Olympiacos
Scoring by quarter: 17–15, 11–18, 24–19, 15-15, Overtime: 13–16
Pts: McCalebb 21; Rebs: Marić 10; Asts: Roberts 5		Pts: Kleiza 19; Rebs: Kleiza 11; Asts: Papaloukas 5

Palais Omnisports de Paris-Bercy, Paris
Attendance: 14,768
Referees: Shmuel Bachar (ISR), Fabio Facchini (ITA), Daniel Hierrezuelo (ESP), Matej Boltauzer (SLO)

== Third place game ==
9 May 2010
18:00

Report

CSKA Moscow (Russia)	90–88 (OT)	(Serbia) Partizan
Scoring by quarter: 25–20, 22–24, 14–18, 17–16, Overtime: 12–10
Pts: Langdon 32; Rebs: Khryapa 6 Asts: Holden, Šiškauskas 4		Pts: Roberts 16; Rebs: Roberts 8 Asts: McCalebb 4

Palais Omnisports de Paris-Bercy, Paris
Attendance: 14,768
Referees: Fabio Facchini (ITA), Daniel Hierrezuelo (ESP), Olegs Latisevs (LAT), Christos Christodoulou (GRE)

== Final ==
9 May 2010
21:00

Report

Regal FC Barcelona (Spain)	86–68	(Greece) Olympiacos
Scoring by quarter: 28–19, 19–17, 17–14, 22–18
Pts: Navarro 21; Rebs: Navarro, Mickeal 5 Asts: Navarro, Sada 3		Pts: Childress 15; Rebs: Childress 6 Asts: Papaloukas, Teodosić 3

Palais Omnisports de Paris-Bercy, Paris
Attendance: 14,768
Referees: Romualdas Brazauskas (LTU), Shmuel Bachar (ISR), David Chambon (FRA), Matej Boltauzer (SLO)

Regal FC Barcelona	Olympiacos

Starters:			P	R	A
PG	9	(Spain) Ricky Rubio	9	4	2
SG	11	(Spain) Juan Carlos Navarro	21	5	3
SF	33	(United States) Pete Mickeal	14	5	1
PF	25	(Slovenia) Erazem Lorbek	8	2	2
C	21	(Senegal) Boniface N'Dong	7	1	0
Reserves:			P	R	A
SG	5	(Italy) Gianluca Basile	6	2	2
PF	8	(Spain) Jordi Trias	0	0	0
PG	10	(Slovenia) Jaka Lakovič	0	0	0
C	17	(Spain) Fran Vázquez	6	2	2
PF	23	(United States) Terence Morris	8	1	1
PG	24	(Spain) Víctor Sada	7	3	3
SG	44	(Spain) Roger Grimau (C)	0	2	2
Head coach:
(Spain) Xavi Pascual

2009–10 Euroleague
Champions

Regal FC Barcelona
2nd title

Starters:			P	R	A
PG	18	(Serbia) Miloš Teodosić	10	3	3
SG	5	(United States) Scoonie Penn	0	1	0
SF	6	(United States) Josh Childress	15	6	2
PF	11	(Lithuania) Linas Kleiza	13	4	0
C	21	(Greece) Sofoklis Schortsanitis	6	2	0
Reserves:			P	R	A
PG	4	(Greece) Theo Papaloukas (C)	12	1	3
C	7	(Croatia) Nikola Vujčić	2	0	0
SG	8	(Greece) Panagiotis Vasilopoulos	0	1	1
PF	9	(Greece) Ioannis Bourousis	9	5	0
SF	10	(Israel) Yotam Halperin	0	0	0
PF	12	(Greece) Loukas Mavrokefalidis	1	1	0
PG	17	(United States) Patrick Beverley	0	0	1
Head coach:
(Greece) Panagiotis Giannakis
