= Víctor Sada =

Spanish basketball player

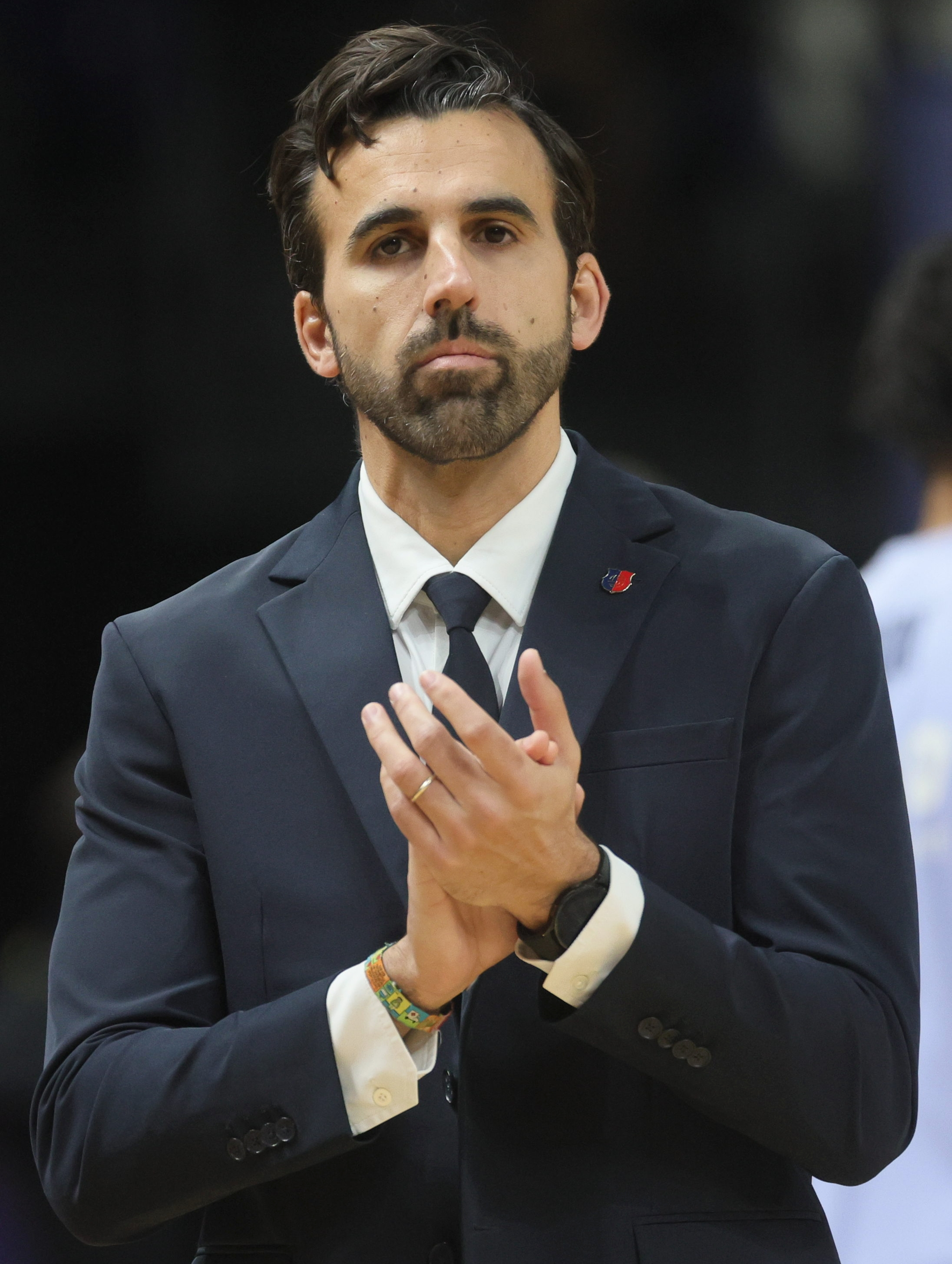
- Sada with FC Barcelona in 2025

Personal information
- Born: 8 March 1984 (age 42) Badalona, Spain
- Listed height: 6 ft 3.75 in (1.92 m)
- Listed weight: 205 lb (93 kg)

Career information
- NBA draft: 2006: undrafted
- Playing career: 2002–2018
- Position: Point guard

Career history

Playing
- 2002–2004: FC Barcelona B
- 2004–2006: FC Barcelona
- 2006–2008: Girona
- 2008–2014: FC Barcelona
- 2014–2016: Andorra
- 2016–2018: FC Barcelona B

Coaching
- 2023–2025: FC Barcelona (assistant)

Career highlights
- As a player: EuroLeague champion (2010); FIBA EuroChallenge champion (2007); 5× Liga ACB champion (2004, 2009, 2011, 2012, 2014); 3× Spanish Cup winner (2010, 2011, 2013); 4× Spanish Supercup winner (2004, 2009–2011)
Medals
Representing Spain
Men's basketball
Summer Olympics
Silver medal – second place	2012 London	Team
FIBA EuroBasket
Gold medal – first place	2011 Lithuania	Team

Víctor Sada Remisa (born 8 March 1984), commonly known as Víctor Sada, is a Spanish professional basketball coach and former professional basketball player, who has last been an assistant coach for FC Barcelona of the Liga ACB and the EuroLeague.

== Professional career ==
Sada joined the Spanish ACB League club FC Barcelona's senior team during the 2003-04 season. He then moved to Girona in 2006. He returned to FC Barcelona in 2008. He was part of the Barcelona team that won the 2009-10 EuroLeague.

After his playing career, Sada became a coach. He was part of the Barcelona staff as assistant coach between 2023 and 2025.

== National team career ==
Sada has also been a member of the senior men's Spain national team. He played at the EuroBasket 2011 and won a silver medal at the 2012 Summer Olympics.

== Career statistics ==
Legend
GP	Games played	GS	Games started	MPG	Minutes per game
FG%	Field-goal percentage	3P%	3-point field-goal percentage	FT%	Free-throw percentage
RPG	Rebounds per game	APG	Assists per game	SPG	Steals per game
BPG	Blocks per game	PPG	Points per game	PIR	Performance index rating
**Bold**	Career high

=== EuroLeague ===
†	Denotes seasons in which Sada won the EuroLeague

Year	Team	GP	GS	MPG	FG%	3P%	FT%	RPG	APG	SPG	BPG	PPG	PIR
2003–04	Barcelona	4	1	9.3	**.556**	.000	**1.000**	1.5	.8	.5	—	3.0	4.0
2004–05	Barcelona	13	0	7.7	.455	**.667**	.667	1.1	.6	.5	.1	1.4	2.5
2005–06	Barcelona	9	0	5.7	.500	.000	.500	1.1	.4	.2	—	0.8	1.0
2008–09	Barcelona	21	11	**16.8**	.286	.208	.867	2.2	**2.7**	**1.0**	.0	2.0	4.2
2009–10†	Barcelona	20	0	11.4	.343	.200	.714	1.2	1.8	.6	—	1.9	3.3
2010–11	Barcelona	20	3	16.6	.326	.091	.800	**2.5**	2.2	.6	.1	2.0	3.6
2011–12	Barcelona	21	0	15.8	.424	.304	.500	2.4	1.1	.3	.0	3.1	3.6
2012–13	Barcelona	**30**	**12**	16.7	.389	.235	.682	2.3	2.3	.6	**.2**	**3.6**	5.4
2013–14	Barcelona	28	0	14.8	.486	.133	.583	2.4	2.5	.4	.0	3.1	**5.6**
Career		166	27	14.1	.397	.210	.685	2.0	1.9	.5	.1	2.5	4.1

== Honors ==
=== FC Barcelona ===
- Spanish League (5): 2003–04, 2008–09, 2010–11, 2011–12, 2013–14
- Spanish King's Cups (3): 2010, 2011, 2013
- Spanish Super Cups (4): 2004, 2009, 2010, 2011
- EuroLeague (1): 2009–10

=== CB Girona ===
- FIBA EuroCup (1): 2007

=== Spanish team ===
- EuroBasket (1): 2011
