= Ablaye Mbaye =

Senegalese basketball player (born 1990)

Club Melilla Baloncesto
- Position: Center
- League: LEB Oro

Personal information
- Born: 13 June 1990 (age 36) Yeumbeul, Senegal
- Listed height: 2.08 m (6 ft 10 in)
- Listed weight: 230 lb (104 kg)

Career information
- NBA draft: 2012: undrafted
- Playing career: 2007–present

Career history
- 2007–2016: FC Barcelona
- 2008–2009: →Sabadell
- 2009–2010: →Cornellà
- 2010–2016: →FC Barcelona B
- 2016–2020: Força Lleida
- 2020–: Melilla

Career highlights
- Spanish League champion (2012)

Papa Abdoulaye Mbaye (born 13 June 1990), commonly known as Ablaye Mbaye, is a Senegalese professional basketball player for Club Melilla Baloncesto of the LEB Oro. Born in Yeumbeul, Senegal, he also holds Spanish citizenship.

== Career ==
=== FC Barcelona ===
Played for Arona Basket Sur at Canary Islands before enter the FC Barcelona Bàsquet junior team on 2007. Nike International Junior Tournament runner-up in 2008, scoring 11 points and grabbing 9 rebounds in the final game against FMP.

In 2008 and 2009 was loaned to Unió Sabadell and CB Cornellà, both farm teams of FC Barcelona Bàsquet. Being a reserve team member, made his professional debut on 12 October 2011, playing 3 minutes for FC Barcelona Bàsquet on a Liga ACB game against CB Estudiantes. He played two more games on 2011–12 season, becoming League champion. Made his EuroLeague debut on 12 May 2013, playing 5 minutes in the Final Four game against CSKA Moscow.

In June 2016 terminated his contract, after six seasons playing for the reserve team on LEB Oro and LEB Plata.

=== Força Lleida ===
On 7 August 2016, signed for LEB Oro side Força Lleida.

== National team ==
Mbaye played for the Senegalese men's national team on the 2008 FIBA Africa Under-18 Championship.
