= 2010 Supercopa de España de Baloncesto =

The Supercopa de España de Baloncesto 2010 was the 7th edition of the Spanish basketball Supercup. It was played in Vitoria-Gasteiz on 24 and 25 September. Regal FC Barcelona won their fourth title, their second in a row.

== Qualified teams ==
Team	Qualification	Date of qualification secured	Participation
Caja Laboral	Host team/2009–10 ACB League winner	15 June 2010	7th
Regal FC Barcelona	2010 King's Cup and 2009–10 Euroleague winner	21 February 2010	6th
Real Madrid	2009–10 ACB League 3rd place	15 May 2010	5th
Power Electronics Valencia	2009–10 Eurocup winner	18 April 2010	1st

== Semifinals ==
Teledeporte – FORTA (Spain)

24 September
19:00 CET (UTC+1)

Report

Caja Laboral	66–67	Power Electronics Valencia
Scoring by quarter: 20–18, 17–16, 15–19, 14–14
Pts: Teletović 14; Rebs: San Emeterio 11; Asts: Ribas, Huertas 4		Pts: Lishouk 18; Rebs: Savanović, Šundov 7 Asts: Cook 6

Fernando Buesa Arena, Vitoria-Gasteiz
Attendance: 9,200
Referees: J.A. Martín Bertrán, Redondo, Oscar Perea

Teledeporte (Spain)

24 September
21:30 CET (UTC+1)

Report

Regal FC Barcelona	89–55	Real Madrid
Scoring by quarter: 26–15, 19–14, 31–8, 13–18
Pts: Morris 16; Rebs: Rubio, Perović, Vázquez 6 Asts: Navarro 6		Pts: Tucker 15; Rebs: Reyes 5 Asts: Prigioni 3

Fernando Buesa Arena, Vitoria-Gasteiz
Attendance: 9,500
Referees: Daniel Hierrezuelo, Antonio Conde, Carlos Peruga

== Final ==
Teledeporte – FORTA (Spain)

25 September
19:00 CET (UTC+1)

Report

Regal FC Barcelona	83–63	Power Electronics Valencia
Scoring by quarter: 26–21, 14–8, 23–18, 20–16
Pts: Navarro 22; Rebs: Morris 8 Asts: Rubio 4		Pts: Savanović 16; Rebs: Šundov 10; Asts: Cook 5

Fernando Buesa Arena, Vitoria-Gasteiz
Attendance: 9,600
Referees: Daniel Hierrezuelo, Redondo, Jiménez Trujillo

Supercopa de España 2010
Champions
Regal FC Barcelona
Fourth title
