= 2011 Supercopa de España de Baloncesto =

The Supercopa de España de Baloncesto 2011 was the 8th edition of this tournament. It was also called Supercopa Endesa for sponsorship reasons.

It was played on September 30 and October 1 in the Bilbao Arena in Bilbao. Regal FC Barcelona was the defending champion and managed to defend their title.

== Participant teams ==
The draw of the semifinals was on September 13.

Team	Qualification	Participation
Regal FC Barcelona	2011 Copa del Rey and 2010–11 ACB champion	7th
Real Madrid	Euroleague 2010–11 Final Four participant	6th
Bizkaia Bilbao Basket	Host team and 2010-11 ACB runner-up	2nd
Caja Laboral	Best coefficient of last season	8th

== Semifinals ==
Teledeporte

September 30
19:30 CEST

Stats

Bizkaia Bilbao Basket	88–93	Caja Laboral
Scoring by quarter: 18–32, 19–21, 17–16, 34–24
Pts: Banić, 16; Rebs: Fischer, 5 Asts: Jackson, 4		Pts: Oleson, 23; Rebs: Séraphin, 5 Asts: Heurtel, 6

Bilbao Arena, Bilbao
Attendance: 8,230
Referees: Pérez Pizarro, Conde, Jiménez

Teledeporte

September 30
21:30 CEST

Stats

FC Barcelona Regal	74–70	Real Madrid
Scoring by quarter: 21–13, 14–20, 17–25, 22–12
Pts: Huertas, 13; Rebs: Lorbek, 7 Asts: Navarro, 2		Pts: Pocius, Carroll, 14; Rebs: Reyes, 10; Asts: Llull, 4

Bilbao Arena, Bilbao
Attendance: 8,230
Referees: Hierrezuelo, García González, Bultó

== Final ==
Teledeporte

October 1
18:00 CEST

Caja Laboral	73–82	FC Barcelona Regal
Scoring by quarter: 20–25, 22–13, 17–20, 14–24
Pts: Teletović, 15; Rebs: San Emeterio, 8 Asts: Heurtel, 4 Eff: Prigioni, 14		Pts: Navarro, 24; Rebs: N'Dong, 10; Asts: Huertas, Navarro, 3 Eff: Navarro, 27

Bilbao Arena, Bilbao
Attendance: 7,800
Referees: Pérez Pizarro, Conde, Jiménez

Supercopa de España 2011
Champions
Regal FC Barcelona
Fifth title
