= Fran Vázquez =

Spanish basketball player (born 1983)

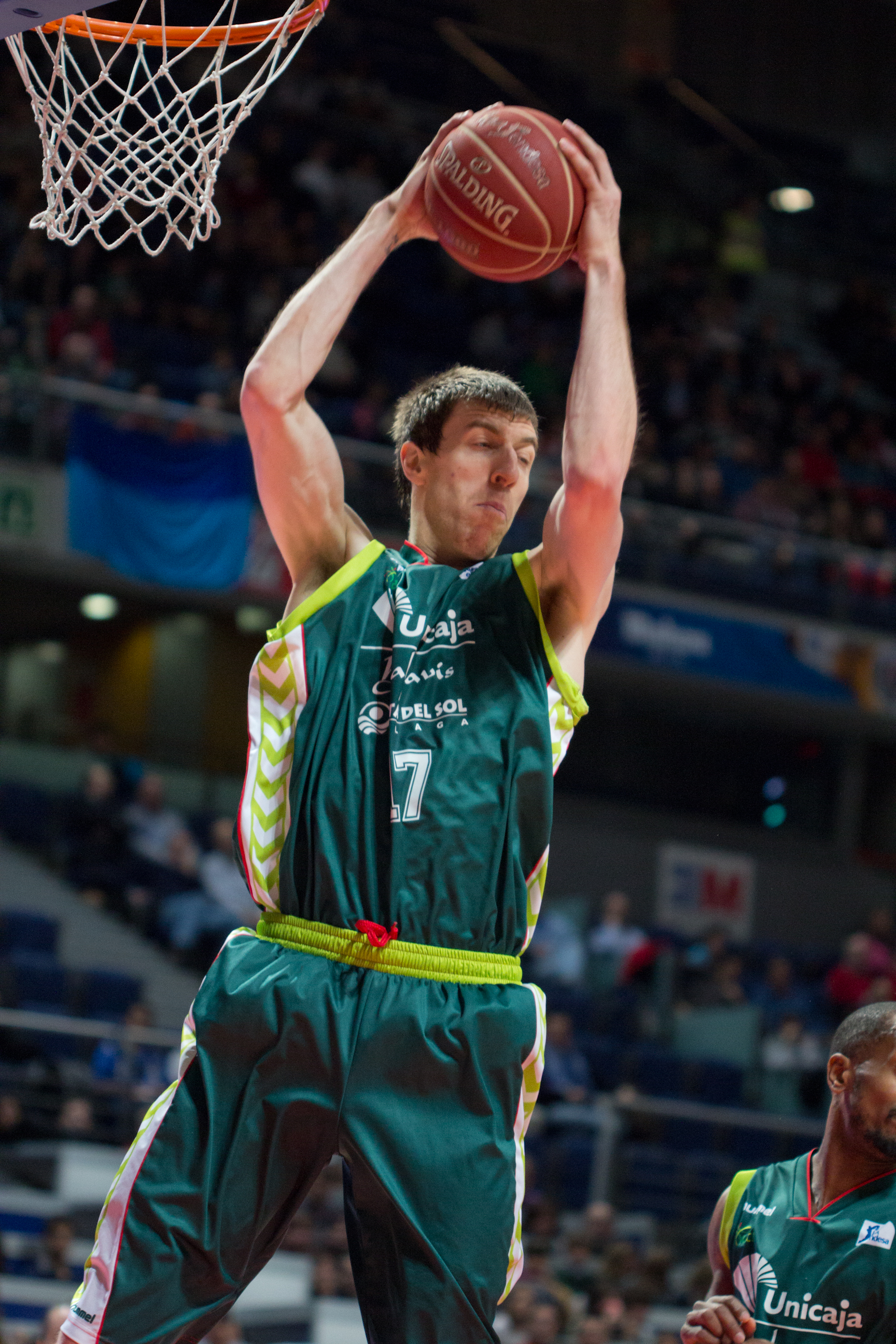
- Vázquez catching a rebound with Baloncesto Málaga

Personal information
- Born: 1 May 1983 (age 43) Chantada, Lugo, Spain
- Listed height: 6 ft 10 in (2.08 m)
- Listed weight: 232 lb (105 kg)

Career information
- NBA draft: 2005: 1st round, 11th overall pick
- Drafted by: Orlando Magic
- Playing career: 2001–2020
- Position: Center

Career history
- 2001–2005: Unicaja
- 2003: →Bilbao Basket
- 2003–2004: →Gran Canaria
- 2005–2006: Girona
- 2006–2012: FC Barcelona
- 2012–2016: Unicaja
- 2016–2018: Canarias
- 2018–2020: Zaragoza

Career highlights
- EuroLeague champion (2010); EuroLeague blocks leader (2009); FIBA Champions League champion (2017); FIBA Intercontinental Cup champion (2017); 3× Liga ACB champion (2009, 2011, 2012); 4× Spanish Cup winner (2005, 2007, 2010, 2011); 3× Spanish Super Cup winner (2009–2011); All-Liga ACB Team (2009); Spanish Cup MVP (2010); Spanish League career stats leaders: Spanish League all-time leader in blocks
- Stats at Basketball Reference
Medals
Representing Spain
Men's basketball
FIBA Europe Under-20 Championship
| Silver medal – second place | 2002 Lithuania |

Francisco "Fran" Vázquez González (Galician pronunciation: [fɾanˈθiskʊ ˈβaθkɪθ]; born 1 May 1983) is a retired Spanish professional basketball player. Originally drafted by the Orlando Magic in 2005, Vázquez decided to remain in the Spanish ACB League rather than enter the National Basketball Association (NBA). He is the Spanish League's all-time leader in blocked shots.

== Professional career ==
Vázquez was selected 11th overall in the 2005 NBA draft by the Orlando Magic. He made headlines when he announced that he would remain playing in the Spanish ACB League for at least the following season, after signing for Akasvayu Girona. This came as a surprise to the Magic, who expected him to join Dwight Howard in the front court for the 2005–06 season, and it enraged many Magic fans.

Vázquez originally gave no indication that he would be returning to Europe after he was drafted, and had indicated that he would like to join the Magic. The Magic retained his NBA rights while he played in non-NBA leagues. In 2010, Vázquez signed a one-year contract extension with the EuroLeague club Barcelona.

In July 2012, Barcelona decided to trade his rights to Unicaja for the rights of Álex Abrines, who moved to FC Barcelona.

On 17 April 2016, in a game against MoraBanc Andorra, Vázquez became the top shot-blocker in Liga ACB history, after surpassing the record of 671 blocks made by Fernando Romay.

On 29 July 2016 Vázquez signed a two-year deal with Tenerife.

On 18 July 2018 he signed a two-year deal with Tecnyconta Zaragoza of the Liga ACB.

On 7 May 2020 Vázquez announced his retirement.

On 6 July 2024, the Orlando Magic finally renounced his draft rights to clear room under the salary cap.

== International career ==
Vázquez played with the senior men's Spain national team at the EuroBasket 2005 and the 2010 FIBA World Championship.

== Career statistics ==
Legend
| GP | Games played | GS | Games started | MPG | Minutes per game |
| FG% | Field-goal percentage | 3P% | 3-point field-goal percentage | FT% | Free-throw percentage |
| RPG | Rebounds per game | APG | Assists per game | SPG | Steals per game |
| BPG | Blocks per game | PPG | Points per game | PIR | Performance index rating |
| **Bold** | Career high |

=== EuroLeague ===
| † | Denotes season in which Vázquez won the EuroLeague |
| * | Led the league |

| Year | Team | GP | GS | MPG | FG% | 3P% | FT% | RPG | APG | SPG | BPG | PPG | PIR |
|---|---|---|---|---|---|---|---|---|---|---|---|---|---|
| 2002–03 | Málaga | 15 | 0 | 7.7 | .565 | — | .833 | 1.5 | — | .3 | .4 | 2.4 | 2.7 |
| 2004–05 | Málaga | 14 | 13 | 18.1 | **.691** | .000 | .727 | 4.1 | .5 | .1 | 1.5 | 7.9 | 9.6 |
| 2006–07 | Barcelona | 23 | 11 | 17.4 | .535 | | .667 | 3.2 | .8 | .5 | 1.2 | 6.6 | 7.5 |
| 2007–08 | Barcelona | 23 | 10 | 15.3 | .570 | .000 | .781 | 2.9 | .6 | .3 | .9 | 6.7 | 7.5 |
| 2008–09 | Barcelona | 23* | 3 | 19.3 | .674 | — | .605 | 4.7 | .7 | .2 | **1.7*** | **8.7** | **11.4** |
| 2009–10† | Barcelona | 22* | 2 | 17.6 | .680 | — | .632 | 3.5 | .8 | .7 | 1.1 | 7.5 | 9.8 |
| 2010–11 | Barcelona | 20 | 7 | 17.2 | .653 | — | .750 | 4.4 | .6 | .3 | 1.0 | 8.1 | 10.6 |
| 2011–12 | Barcelona | 21 | 1 | 13.6 | .603 | .000 | .739 | 3.2 | .3 | .3 | 1.0 | 4.4 | 6.9 |
| 2012–13 | Málaga | **24** | **19** | 15.9 | .554 | .000 | **.900** | 3.1 | .4 | .4 | .7 | 5.4 | 5.0 |
| 2013–14 | Málaga | 22 | 11 | 18.3 | .589 | — | .696 | 4.5 | .6 | .5 | 1.1 | 6.5 | 8.4 |
| 2014–15 | Málaga | **24** | 11 | **20.1** | .538 | — | .754 | **4.8** | **1.0** | **.8** | .8 | 7.2 | 10.0 |
| 2015–16 | Málaga | 23 | 6 | 14.8 | .523 | — | .750 | 2.7 | .2 | .2 | .3 | 5.4 | 4.5 |
| Career | | 254 | 94 | 16.5 | .597 | .000 | .723 | 3.6 | .6 | .4 | 1.0 | 6.5 | 7.9 |

== Awards and accomplishments ==
=== Club honors ===
- EuroLeague (1):
  - 2010
- ACB League (Spanish League) (3)
  - 2008–09, 2010–11, 2011–12
- Spanish King's Cup (4):
  - 2005, 2007, 2010, 2011
- Spanish Super Cup (3):
  - 2009, 2010, 2011

=== Spanish junior national team ===
- 2000 FIBA Europe Under-20 Championship: Silver

=== Individual awards ===
- Spanish King's Cup MVP (1):
  - 2010
- ACB League Player of the Week (5):
  - Weeks 17 and 27 (2004–05)
  - Weeks 15, 26 and 27 (2008–09)
- ACB League Player of the Month (1):
  - March (2009)
- All-ACB Team (1):
  - 2009
- Liga ACB all-time leader in blocked shots
