= Erazem Lorbek =

Slovenian basketball player (born 1984)

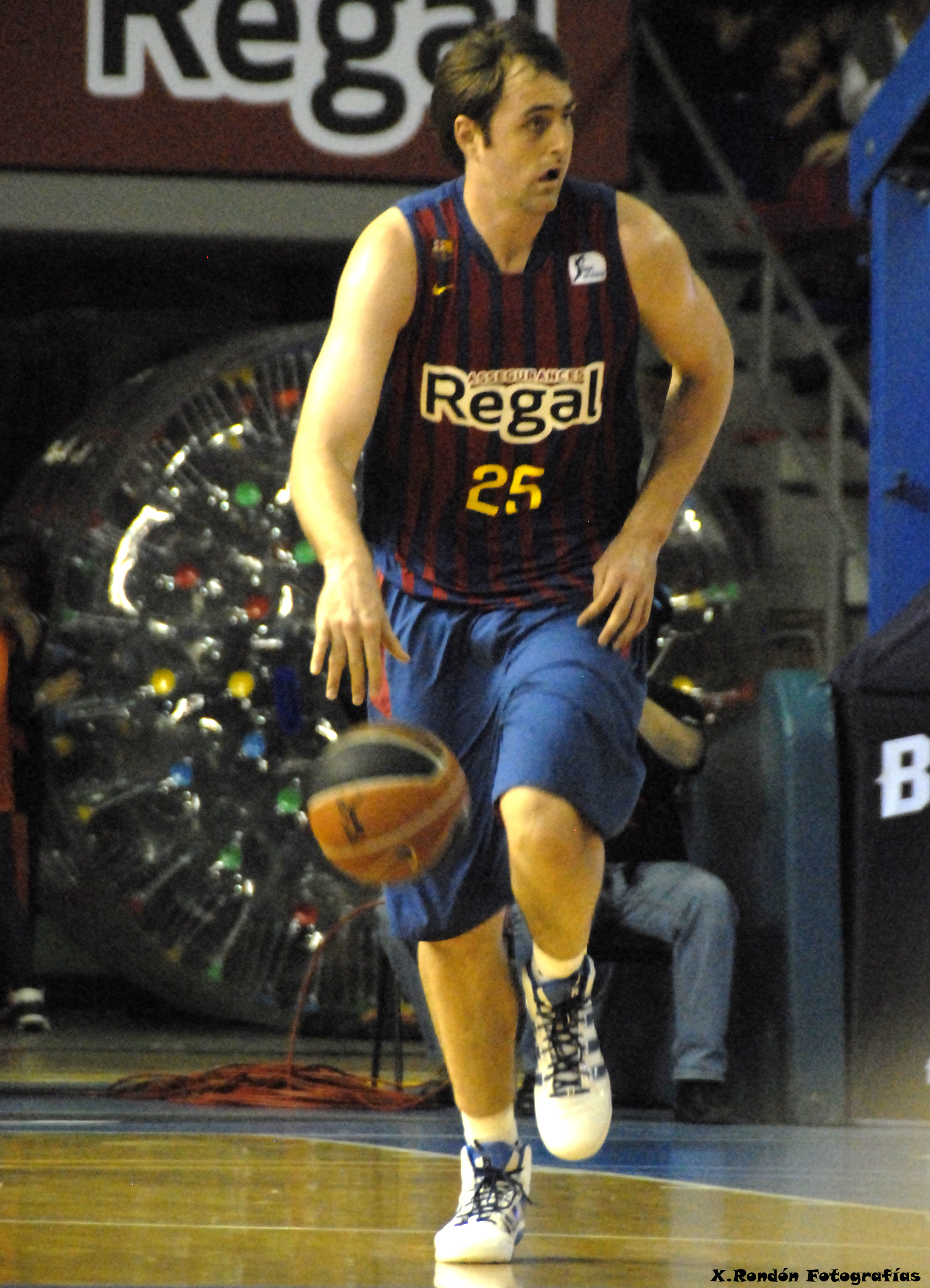
- Lorbek with FC Barcelona in 2012

Personal information
- Born: February 21, 1984 (age 42) Ljubljana, SR Slovenia, Yugoslavia
- Listed height: 6 ft 10.75 in (2.10 m)
- Listed weight: 250 lb (113 kg)

Career information
- College: Michigan State (2002–2003)
- NBA draft: 2005: 2nd round, 46th overall pick
- Drafted by: Indiana Pacers
- Playing career: 2003–2018
- Position: Power forward / center
- Number: 12, 25

Career history
- 2003–2006: Fortitudo Bologna
- 2006–2007: Unicaja Málaga
- 2007: →Benetton Treviso
- 2007–2008: Lottomatica Roma
- 2008–2009: CSKA Moscow
- 2009–2014: FC Barcelona
- 2018: Petrol Olimpija

Career highlights
- EuroLeague champion (2010); All-EuroLeague First Team (2012); 2× All-EuroLeague Second Team (2009, 2010); EuroLeague Rising Star (2005); 3× Liga ACB champion (2011, 2012, 2014); VTB United League champion (2008); Lega Serie A champion (2005); Slovenian League champion (2018); Russian League champion (2009); 3× Spanish Cup winner (2010, 2011, 2013); Italian Cup winner (2007); Italian Super Cup winner (2005); 3× Spanish Super Cup winner (2009, 2010, 2011); Liga ACB Finals MVP (2012); 2× All-Liga ACB First Team (2010, 2012); All-Russian League First Team (2009); FIBA Europe Under-18 Championship MVP (2002); FIBA Europe Under-20 Championship MVP (2004)
- Stats at Basketball Reference
Medals
Representing Slovenia
FIBA Europe U-18 Championship
Silver medal – second place	2002 Germany	Under-18 Team
FIBA Europe U-20 Championship
Gold medal – first place	2004 Czech Republic	Under-20 Team

Erazem Lorbek (born February 21, 1984) is a Slovenian former professional basketball player. At a height of 6 ft 10 3/4 in (2.10 m) tall, he primarily played at the power forward position, but he was also capable of playing at the center position. A three-time All-EuroLeague Team member, he won the EuroLeague title with FC Barcelona in 2010.

Lorbek was also a regular member of the senior Slovenian national basketball team. He earned an All-EuroBasket Team selection, as he helped lead the Slovenian national team to a fourth-place finish at the 2009 EuroBasket.

== Early career ==
Lorbek began playing basketball with the youth clubs of Union Olimpija, the top basketball club in his hometown, and in the Slovenian league. Lorbek then played with Olimpija's B squad, in the minor leagues of Slovenia, from 1999 to 2002.

== College career ==
Lorbek attended Michigan State University in the U.S., where he played college basketball for Tom Izzo and the Spartans. In the 2002–03 season, as a freshman, he averaged 6.4 points and 3.3 rebounds per game.

== Professional career ==
=== Fortitudo Bologna (2003–06) ===
After one season of college basketball, Lorbek chose to return to Europe, and signed a deal with Fortitudo Bologna of the Italian league, where he began his professional career, and played from 2003 to 2006 (for sponsorship reasons, the team was known as Skipper Bologna in the 2003–04 season, and Climamio Bologna from 2004 to 2006).

Lorbek won the EuroLeague 2004–05 season's Rising Star award, and originally declared for the 2004 NBA draft, but he ultimately withdrew his name from consideration.

=== 2006–07 ===
Lorbek began the 2006–07 season on loan from the Spanish league club Unicaja Málaga to the Italian league club Benetton Treviso; however, in February 2007, the deal was voided by the Italian Basketball Federation, due to unspecified violations of federation regulations.

=== Lottomatica Roma (2007–08) ===
Lorbek then signed with Lottomatica Roma of the Italian league in 2007, where he became one of the best power forwards of the EuroLeague. With Roma, he averaged career-high 13.3 points, 5.6 rebounds, 1.6 steals and 1 block over 20 Euroleague games.

=== CSKA Moscow (2008–09) ===
Lorbek joined the Russian club CSKA Moscow in 2008, with whom he reached the EuroLeague 2008–09 season's final, in his first season, and he was voted to the All-EuroLeague Second Team. Over 21 Euroleague games, he averaged 12 points and 5 rebounds per game.

=== FC Barcelona (2009–14) ===
On August 18, 2009, he was transferred to the Spanish club FC Barcelona, for an undisclosed fee. He signed a three-year contract, with the possibility to leave and join the NBA, after the second year of the contract.

On June 22, 2013, he underwent arthroscopic surgery on his knee, which caused him problems during the 2012–13 season. In 2013–14 season, which would be his final with FC Barcelona, he appeared in 19 Euroleague games, averaging 8 points and 2.7 rebounds per game. In the Spanish League, he averaged similar numbers, with 8.7 points on average over 24 games. In August 2014, he parted ways with Barcelona.

=== Return attempts and retirement ===
Lorbek did not play in 2014–15 and 2015–16 seasons. He was recovering from a knee injury that he suffered during his service with Barcelona Bàsquet. He signed with the French LNB Pro A club Limoges, in December 2016. However, he failed his physical, and thus was cut from the team. On August 14, 2017, Lorbek joined the Italian club Dinamo Sassari, for one month. On September 11, 2017, he left Sassari, without having played with the team in any games.

On January 19, 2018, Lorbek signed with the Slovenian club Petrol Olimpija. He played a single game for Olimpija in the Sloveninan League and recorded 12 points and 6 rebounds, only to retire from playing professional basketball shortly after.

== NBA draft rights ==
Lorbek was drafted in the 2nd round of the 2005 NBA draft, by the Indiana Pacers. But the Pacers did not sign him, and Lorbek continued to play in Europe. During the 2011 NBA draft, the Pacers traded the draft rights to Lorbek, to the San Antonio Spurs, as part of their trade for George Hill.

In 2016, Lorbek joined the San Antonio Spurs' 2016 NBA Summer League roster.

== National team career ==
Lorbek was also a member of the senior men's Slovenian national basketball team. With Slovenia's senior national team, he played at the 2005, 2007, 2009, and 2011 editions of the FIBA EuroBasket. He was one of the top players of the 2009 tournament, and earned the power forward position in the All-Tournament Team. In 2011, Lorbek said that he didn't want to play for the Slovenian national team at EuroBasket 2011, just 15 minutes before Slovenia's training camp started. Two days later, he changed his mind, and decided instead to represent Slovenia at the tournament, which was held in Lithuania.

== Personal life ==
Lorbek is the older brother of Domen Lorbek and Klemen Lorbek, who were also professionals basketball players.

== Career statistics ==
Legend
GP	Games played	GS	Games started	MPG	Minutes per game
FG%	Field-goal percentage	3P%	3-point field-goal percentage	FT%	Free-throw percentage
RPG	Rebounds per game	APG	Assists per game	SPG	Steals per game
BPG	Blocks per game	PPG	Points per game	PIR	Performance index rating
**Bold**	Career high	†	Won a EuroLeague championship	*	Led the league

=== EuroLeague ===
Year	Team	GP	GS	MPG	FG%	3P%	FT%	RPG	APG	SPG	BPG	PPG	PIR
2003–04	Fortitudo Bologna	22	1	10.7	.574	.400	.542	2.3	.4	.5	.4	3.5	4.4
2004–05	Fortitudo Bologna	20	13	22.1	.566	.368	.706	4.9	.9	1.1	.9	9.3	11.8
2005–06	Fortitudo Bologna	19	12	23.0	.529	**.474**	.528	4.4	1.1	.8	.4	9.6	10.6
2006–07	Málaga	9	1	14.0	.323	.200	.500	3.8	.7	.7	.7	2.7	5.2
2007–08	Roma	20	19	**26.8**	.530	.390	.685	**5.6**	.8	**1.6**	**1.0**	**13.3**	**15.4**
2008–09	CSKA Moscow	21	15	23.1	**.584**	.444	.652	5.0	.8	.8	.7	12.0	14.6
2009–10†	Barcelona	22*	17	24.6	.536	.423	.674	4.4	1.2	.8	.8	8.6	11.5
2010–11	Barcelona	20	16	21.1	.512	.371	.722	3.6	.9	.9	.3	8.4	11.0
2011–12	Barcelona	21	21*	25.2	.527	.383	**.761**	4.6	**1.3**	.6	.3	13.0	15.1
2012–13	Barcelona	**30**	**26**	21.2	.489	.419	.750	3.4	1.0	.2	.2	8.9	8.5
2013–14	Barcelona	19	16	19.4	.484	.325	.556	2.7	.6	.1	.2	8.0	6.8
Career		223	157	21.3	.526	.388	.668	4.0	.9	.7	.5	9.1	10.6

== Awards and accomplishments ==
=== Club honours ===
Fortitudo Bologna

- Italian League (1): 2004–05
- Italian Supercup (1): 2005

Pallacanestro Treviso

- Italian Cup (1): 2006–07

CSKA Moscow

- VTB United League (1): 2008
- Russian Championship (1): 2008–09

FC Barcelona Bàsquet

- Spanish League (3): 2010–11, 2011–12, 2013–14
- Spanish Cup (3): 2010, 2011, 2013
- Spanish Supercup (3): 2009, 2010, 2011
- EuroLeague (1): 2009–10

Olimpija Ljubljana

- Slovenian League (1): 2017–18

=== Individual awards ===
==== Pro clubs ====
- EuroLeague Rising Star:
  - 2004–05
- EuroLeague MVP of the Round (3):
  - Week 2, 2007–08
  - Quarterfinals Game 2, 2008–09
  - Week 7, 2011–12
- EuroLeague MVP of the Month:
  - March/April, 2008–09
- All-EuroLeague Team (3):
  - All-EuroLeague First Team (1):
  - 2011–12
  - All-EuroLeague Second Team (2):
  - 2008–09
  - 2009–10
- All-Spanish ACB League Team (2):
  - 2009–10
  - 2011–12
- Spanish ACB League Finals MVP:
  - 2011–12

==== Slovenian junior national team ====
- 2002 FIBA Europe Under-18 Championship: Silver
- 2002 FIBA Europe Under-18 Championship: All-Tournament Team
- 2002 FIBA Europe Under-18 Championship: MVP
- 2004 FIBA Europe Under-20 Championship: Gold
- 2004 FIBA Europe Under-20 Championship: All-Tournament Team
- 2004 FIBA Europe Under-20 Championship: MVP

==== Slovenian senior national team ====
- 2009 EuroBasket: All-Tournament Team
