= Christos Christodoulou (referee) =

Retired Greek basketball referee (born 1961)

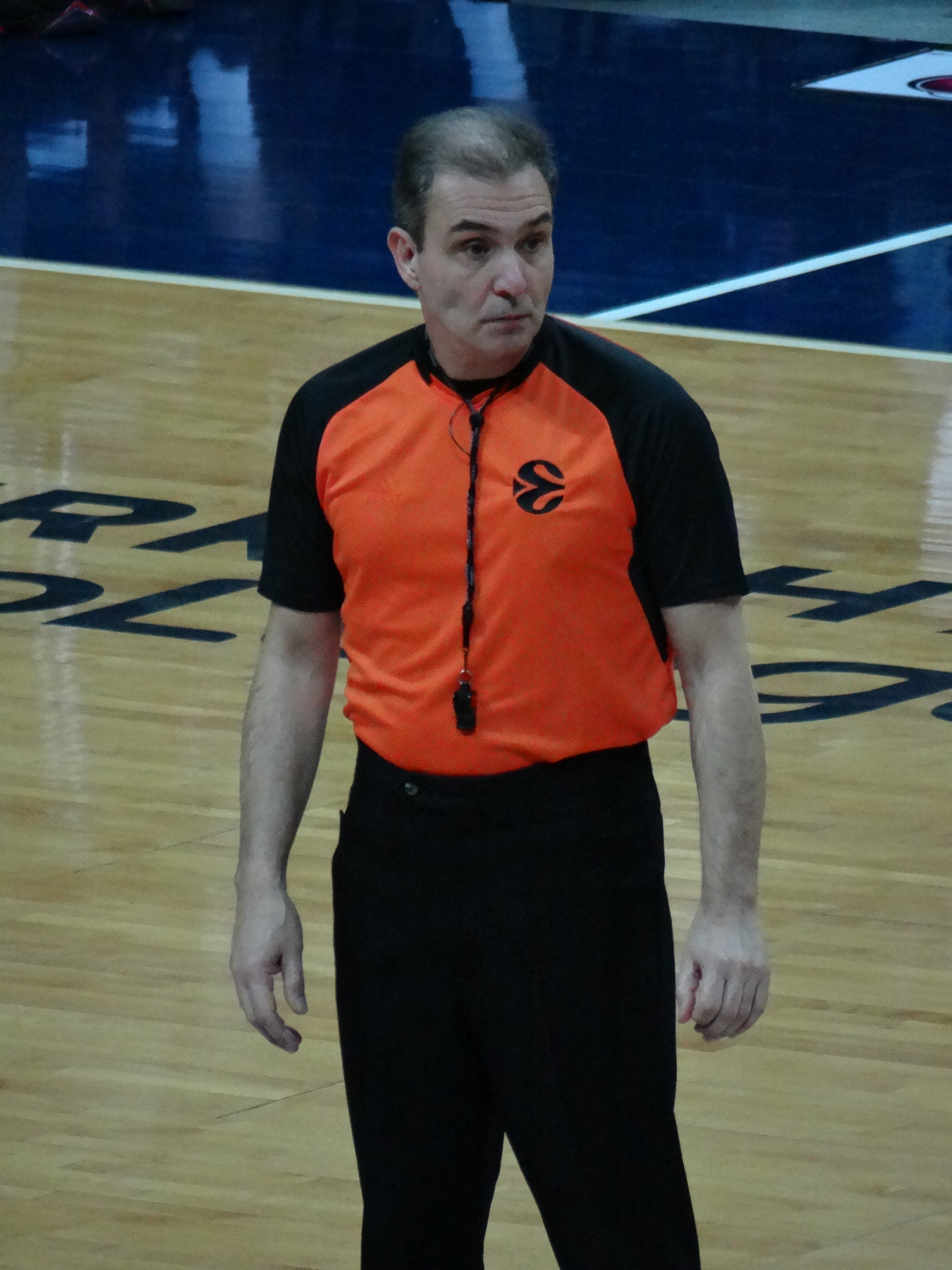

Personal information
- Born: August 13, 1961 (age 65) Athens, Greece

Career information
- Position: Referee
- Officiating career: 1985–2005

Career highlights
- Appointed FIBA referee (1990–2005); Officiated at 1996 and 2000 Summer Olympics; Officiated at multiple FIBA World Championships and EuroBaskets

Christos Christodoulou (in Greek: Χρήστος Χριστοδούλου; born 13 August 1961) is a retired Greek professional basketball referee, who has officiated at the highest international level for two decades and is widely considered as one of the most experienced European referees of his generation. He currently is one of the so called Referee Coaches at the EuroLeague.

== Refereeing career ==
Christodoulou began officiating in Greek domestic competitions in the mid-1980s and was named to the FIBA international referees list in 1990. Over the course of his career, he officiated at major international tournaments, including the 1996 Summer Olympics in Atlanta and the 2000 Summer Olympics in Sydney.

He also took part in several FIBA World Championships and EuroBasket tournaments, and was known for his firm control and deep knowledge of the game.

== Personal life ==
Before becoming a referee, Christodoulou was a professional basketball player. He played for Greek clubs including Panionios B.C. and represented the Greek national youth teams in the early 1980s.

== Legacy ==
Christodoulou is widely respected in the European basketball community for his longevity and contributions to officiating standards in Greece and across Europe.

After retiring from active refereeing in 2005, he became involved in training and mentoring younger referees under the Hellenic Basketball Federation, and also for the EuroLeague.
