= 2009 Supercopa de España de Baloncesto =

The Supercopa de España de Baloncesto 2009 was held on 2–3 October in the Centro Insular de Deportes arena in Las Palmas. FC Barcelona won their third title.

== Qualified teams ==
Team	Qualification	Date of qualification secured	Participation
CB Gran Canaria	Host team	10 July 2009	1st
Regal FC Barcelona	2008–09 ACB League winner	7 June 2009	5th
Caja Laboral	2009 King's Cup winner	22 February 2009	6th
Real Madrid	2008–09 ACB League 4th place	12 July 2009	4th

== Semifinals ==
Teledeporte – FORTA (Spain)

2 October
18:30 CET (UTC+1)

Report

Gran Canaria 2014	51–74	Regal FC Barcelona
Scoring by quarter: 13–15, 13–24, 15–19, 10–16
Pts: McDonald 12; Rebs: Augustine 10; Asts: Fisher 2		Pts: N'Dong 13; Rebs: N'Dong 6 Asts: Ricky, Navarro 6

Centro Insular de Deportes, Las Palmas
Attendance: 4,200
Referees: Francisco de la Maza
Miguel Ángel Pérez Pérez
Conde

La2 (Spain)

2 October
21:00 CET (UTC+1)

Report

Caja Laboral	62–87	Real Madrid
Scoring by quarter: 18–30, 7–18, 22–18, 15–21
Pts: Teletović 17; Rebs: Barać 4 Asts: Ribas 5		Pts: Bullock 13; Rebs: Hervelle 7 Asts: Llull 5

Centro Insular de Deportes, Las Palmas
Attendance: 3,800
Referees: Juan Carlos Arteaga
Jose Antonio Martín Bertrán
Óscar Perea

== Final ==
La2 (Spain)

3 October
18:00 CET (UTC+1)

Report

Regal FC Barcelona	86–82	Real Madrid
Scoring by quarter: 29–27, 17–22, 20–22, 20–11
Pts: Navarro 22; Rebs: Lorbek 7 Asts: Navarro 5		Pts: Garbajosa 17; Rebs: Veličković 8 Asts: Bullock 3

Centro Insular de Deportes, Las Palmas
Attendance: 4,600
Referees: Juan Carlos Arteaga, E. Pérez Pizarro, Antonio Conde

Supercopa de España 2009
Champions
Regal FC Barcelona
Third title

== See also ==
- Supercopa de España de Baloncesto
- ACB
