= Pete Mickeal =

American basketball player (born 1978)

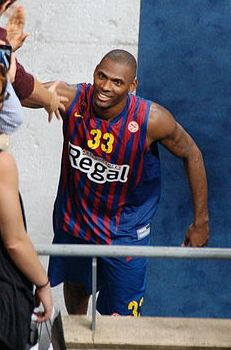
- Mickeal wearing the jersey of FC Barcelona

Personal information
- Born: February 22, 1978 (age 48) Rock Island, Illinois, U.S.
- Listed height: 6 ft 7 in (2.01 m)
- Listed weight: 240 lb (109 kg)

Career information
- High school: Rock Island (Rock Island, Illinois)
- College: Indian Hills CC (1996–1998); Cincinnati (1998–2000)
- NBA draft: 2000: 2nd round, 58th overall pick
- Drafted by: New York Knicks
- Playing career: 2000–2017
- Position: Small forward
- Number: 33

Career history
- 2000–2001: Tampa Bay ThunderDawgs
- 2001–2002: Kansas City Knights
- 2002: Talk 'N Text Phone Pals
- 2003–2004: Peristeri
- 2004: Dynamo Moscow
- 2004–2005: Makedonikos
- 2005–2006: Breogán
- 2006–2007: Daegu Orions
- 2007–2009: Saski Baskonia
- 2009–2013: Barcelona
- 2014: Murcia
- 2014: Cangrejeros de Santurce
- 2015: Bucaneros de La Guaira
- 2015–2017: Atenas de Córdoba

Career highlights
- EuroLeague champion (2010); 3× Liga ACB champion (2008, 2011, 2012); Liga ACB Finals MVP (2008); Spanish King's Cup MVP (2013); KBL Top Scorer (2007); All-KBL Team (2007); All-Greek League Team (2005); 2× Greek All-Star Game (2004, 2005); ABA Finals MVP (2002); ABA MVP (2002); ABA All Star-Game (2002); 2× First-team All-Conference USA (1999, 2000)
- Stats at Basketball Reference
Medals
Men's basketball
Representing United States
Summer Universiade
Gold medal – first place	1999 Palma	National Team

Fenton Pete Mickeal (born February 22, 1978) is an American former professional basketball player, who served as an NBA scout for the Minnesota Timberwolves and Washington Wizards. He was selected by the Dallas Mavericks in the second round, with the 58th pick of the 2000 NBA draft. He currently serves as the president of Mickeal Sports Group (MSG) which specializes in marketing and placing professional basketball players worldwide. Mickeal, is considered one of the greatest American players to ever play in Europe. With 12 cup championships in the (ACB) Spain which is widely considered the second best league in the world. Along with a 2010 Euroleague Championship with Barcelona, he is a Junior college Hall of Famer with 2 national championships at Indian Hills. He is the current president of the Myrtle Beach International Combine, a college pre-draft combine that broke records in 2021 with 400,000 views on Twitch.

== High school career ==
Born in Rock Island, Illinois, Mickeal attended Rock Island High School, the same school attended by former NBA player and coach Don Nelson. In two full seasons of varsity basketball, Mickeal broke the school's all-time scoring record.

== College career ==
After high school, Mickeal played for two years as a small forward with Indian Hills Community College. As a sophomore at Indian Hills C.C., he was named National Junior College Player of the Year, after leading the team to its second straight national championship. For his junior year, he transferred to play at Cincinnati, where he played with the Cincinnati Bearcats. As a senior, he was named an Honorable Mention All-American by the Associated Press.

== Professional career ==
=== NBA ===
After two productive seasons with Cincinnati, Mickeal entered the 2000 NBA draft. After being drafted by the Dallas Mavericks, Mickeal participated in training camp with them. He never played for the Mavericks or any other NBA team in an actual game. Thus, Mickeal is 1 of 8 players that were selected in the 2000 NBA Draft, but never played a game in the league.

His contract with the Mavs was waived, but he was soon signed as a free agent by the New York Knicks. He was on the injured reserve his entire time as a Knick, and was waived later in the season. In the 2002–03 season, he drew attention again from the NBA, being signed to a practice-squad contract with the Houston Rockets, before being waived a week later. He also played with the Orlando Magic in the Orlando Summer League and the Las Vegas Summer League in 2004.

=== American Basketball Association ===
After his unsuccessful run in the NBA, Mickeal went on to have great success in the ABA with the Tampa Bay ThunderDawgs, and particularly the Kansas City Knights. After leading the Knights to a 35–5 record in the 2001–02 season, Mickeal's team won that year's championship, and he was awarded the league MVP award and Final MVP award.

=== Asia ===
After the 2001–02 season in the ABA, Mickeal signed with the Talk 'N Text Phone Pals team of the Philippine Basketball Association. He also played in the South Korean League during the 2006–07 season, playing with Daegu Orions.

=== Europe ===
After playing with the Houston Rockets practice-squad, Mickeal returned overseas for the 2003–04 season. He played in the Greek League with both Peristeri and Makedonikos, with a brief 2004 interlude in the Russian SuperLeague with Dynamo Moscow. In 2005, he moved to the Spanish League club Breogán. After a season there, he went to the South Korean League for the 2006–07 season, playing with Daegu Orions, before returning to the Spain to play with the Spanish League club TAU Cerámica.

On June 29, 2009, he signed with the Spanish League club FC Barcelona. During the EuroLeague 2009–10 season, Mickeal played at small forward for FC Barcelona, and he helped them win the EuroLeague 2010 Final. In 2012, he was named to the All-ACB Finals Team.

On January 10, 2014, he signed with UCAM Murcia. On February 23, 2014, he parted ways with Murcia after playing only 5 games in ACB League.

=== Latin America ===
On March 9, 2014, he signed with Cangrejeros de Santurce of the Baloncesto Superior Nacional. However, he was released on May 31, 2014, due to his knee injury.

On October 28, 2014, Mickael signed with Bucaneros de La Guaira of Venezuela for the 2015 LPB season.

On November 26, 2015, he signed with Atenas de Córdoba of the Argentine Liga Nacional de Básquet. On December 19, 2015, he parted ways with Atenas after appearing in five games. On May 9, 2016, he re-signed with Atenas.

== Post-playing career ==
After he retired from playing professional basketball, Mickeal became a scout, for the NBA's Minnesota Timberwolves.

== Career statistics ==
Legend
GP	Games played	GS	Games started	MPG	Minutes per game
FG%	Field-goal percentage	3P%	3-point field-goal percentage	FT%	Free-throw percentage
RPG	Rebounds per game	APG	Assists per game	SPG	Steals per game
BPG	Blocks per game	PPG	Points per game	PIR	Performance index rating
**Bold**	Career high

=== EuroLeague ===
†	Denotes season in which Mickeal won the EuroLeague
*	Led the league

Year	Team	GP	GS	MPG	FG%	3P%	FT%	RPG	APG	SPG	BPG	PPG	PIR
2007–08	Baskonia	18	14	16.1	.500	.318	.813	4.4	.3	.8	.2	8.1	8.8
2008–09	Baskonia	19	15	25.4	.475	.360	.896	**5.6**	1.0	**1.1**	.2	10.7	12.9
2009–10†	Barcelona	**21**	19	26.7	**.547**	.400	**.907**	5.1	.5	1.0	.1	12.0	14.1
2010–11	Barcelona	4	3	**32.3**	.432	.300	.833	4.5	**1.5**	.3	**.5**	**14.0**	**14.3**
2011–12	Barcelona	21	13	23.3	.421	**.552***	.863	4.1	.9	**1.1**	—	9.2	9.1
2012–13	Barcelona	20	**20**	25.7	.528	.200	.861	3.9	.9	**1.1**	.4	11.4	11.7
Career		103	84	24.9	.492	.362	.875	4.6	.8	1.0	.2	10.5	11.5
