= Lawrence Roberts (basketball) =

American basketball player (born 1982)

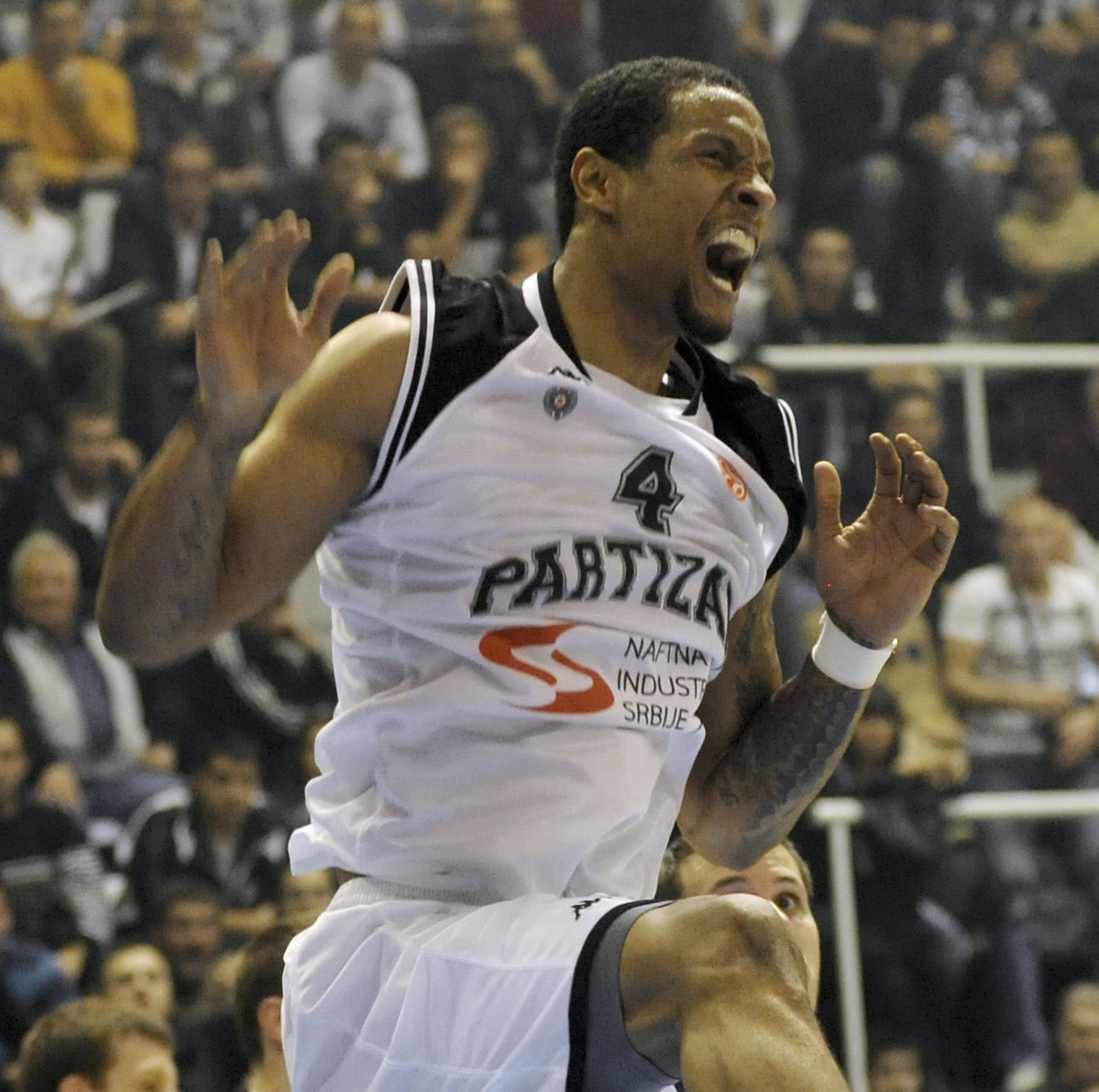
- Roberts with Partizan in 2009

Personal information
- Born: October 20, 1982 (age 44) Houston, Texas, U.S.
- Listed height: 6 ft 9 in (2.06 m)
- Listed weight: 240 lb (109 kg)

Career information
- High school: Lamar (Houston, Texas)
- College: Baylor (2001–2003); Mississippi State (2003–2005)
- NBA draft: 2005: 2nd round, 55th overall pick
- Drafted by: Seattle SuperSonics
- Playing career: 2005–2015
- Position: Power forward
- Number: 44

Career history
- 2005–2007: Memphis Grizzlies
- 2006: →Arkansas RimRockers
- 2008–2009: Crvena zvezda
- 2009–2010: Partizan
- 2010–2011: Efes Pilsen
- 2011–2012: Lietuvos rytas
- 2012–2013: Bayern Munich
- 2013–2014: Darüşşafaka
- 2014–2015: BCM Gravelines

Career highlights
- Basketball League of Serbia champion (2010); ABA League champion (2010); Radivoj Korać Cup winner (2010); Turkish President's Cup winner (2010); Consensus first-team All-American (2004); SEC Player of the Year (2004); SEC Rookie of the Year – AP (2004); 2× First-team All-SEC (2004, 2005)
- Stats at NBA.com
- Stats at Basketball Reference

Lawrence Edward Roberts III (born October 20, 1982) is an American former professional basketball player. Standing at 6 ft 9 in (2.06 m), he played at the power forward position.

== College career ==
Roberts attended Baylor University for two seasons, where he made the Big 12 All-Freshman Team, but transferred to Mississippi State University in 2003 following the basketball scandal that rocked Baylor's program that year. He was a first-team All-American and the SEC Player of the Year in 2004, leading Mississippi State to its first top-two seeding in the NCAA tournament. In the 2003–04 season he averaged 16.9 points and 10.1 rebounds. He was first-team All-SEC and a first-team All-American, finishing third to Jameer Nelson and Emeka Okafor for national player of the year honors. In the 2004–05 season he averaged 16.9 points and 11 rebounds. He recorded the first triple-double in Mississippi State history against Nicholls State University with 18 points, 11 rebounds, and 12 assists, while wearing an irritating translucent plastic face mask to protect his broken nose.

== Professional career ==
=== NBA ===
Roberts was a second round draft pick (55th overall) of the Seattle SuperSonics in the 2005 NBA draft, but was traded to the Memphis Grizzlies in exchange for two future second-round draft picks and cash considerations. He signed a contract on July 10, 2005.

=== Europe ===
After two seasons with the Grizzlies, in July 2007, Roberts moved to Europe and signed with Greek powerhouse Olympiacos on a two-year deal. However, in October 2007, he was released from his contract before the season started.

Without a club and not playing competitive basketball for several months, Roberts was signed by Serbian team KK Crvena zvezda on September 17, 2008, for a one-year contract.

On September 25, 2009, Roberts signed the Indiana Pacers training camp roster, but he got released less than a month later on October 19, 2009.

Two days later, on October 21, 2009, Roberts signed a one-year contract with KK Partizan. With Partizan he won the 2009–10 Serbian National Championship, the 2010 Serbian National Cup, the 2010 Adriatic League and took 4th place at the Euroleague's Final Four in Paris.

In July 2010, Roberts signed with the Turkish team Efes Pilsen.

On July 12, 2011, Roberts signed with BC Lietuvos rytas.

In July 2012, he signed with Bayern Munich. In October 2013, he signed with Darüşşafaka of the TBL2.

On October 2, 2014, Roberts signed with BCM Gravelines of the French LNB Pro A averaging 4.7 points and 4.9 rebounds. On February 4, 2015, Roberts left the team citing personal reasons.

== Career statistics ==
Legend
GP	Games played	GS	Games started	MPG	Minutes per game
FG%	Field-goal percentage	3P%	3-point field-goal percentage	FT%	Free-throw percentage
RPG	Rebounds per game	APG	Assists per game	SPG	Steals per game
BPG	Blocks per game	PPG	Points per game	PIR	Performance index rating
**Bold**	Career high

=== NBA ===
==== Regular season ====
Year	Team	GP	GS	MPG	FG%	3P%	FT%	RPG	APG	SPG	BPG	PPG
2005–06	Memphis	33	0	5.5	**.455**	.000	.478	1.5	.2	.2	.1	1.5
2006–07	Memphis	**54**	**18**	**17.9**	.452	.000	**.725**	**4.8**	**.6**	**.7**	**.2**	**5.2**
Career		87	18	13.2	.452	.000	.688	3.6	.4	.5	.2	3.8

=== Euroleague ===
Year	Team	GP	GS	MPG	FG%	3P%	FT%	RPG	APG	SPG	BPG	PPG	PIR
2009–10	Partizan Belgrade	**21**	**21**	**32.2**	.335	.319	**.658**	**7.4**	**2.3**	**1.1**	.3	**9.0**	**10.0**
2010–11	Efes Pilsen	16	3	20.9	**.435**	**.379**	.594	5.1	.8	.9	**.6**	6.5	7.5
Career		37	24	27.3	.368	.337	.640	6.4	1.6	1.0	.5	7.9	8.9

== Personal ==
Roberts is the son of Lawrence E. "Butch" Jr., and Cynthia Roberts, nephew of former sportscaster Robin Roberts of Good Morning America fame and grandson of the late Col. Lawrence E. Roberts Sr. and Lucimarian Roberts.
