= Boniface N'Dong =

Senegalese-German basketball player

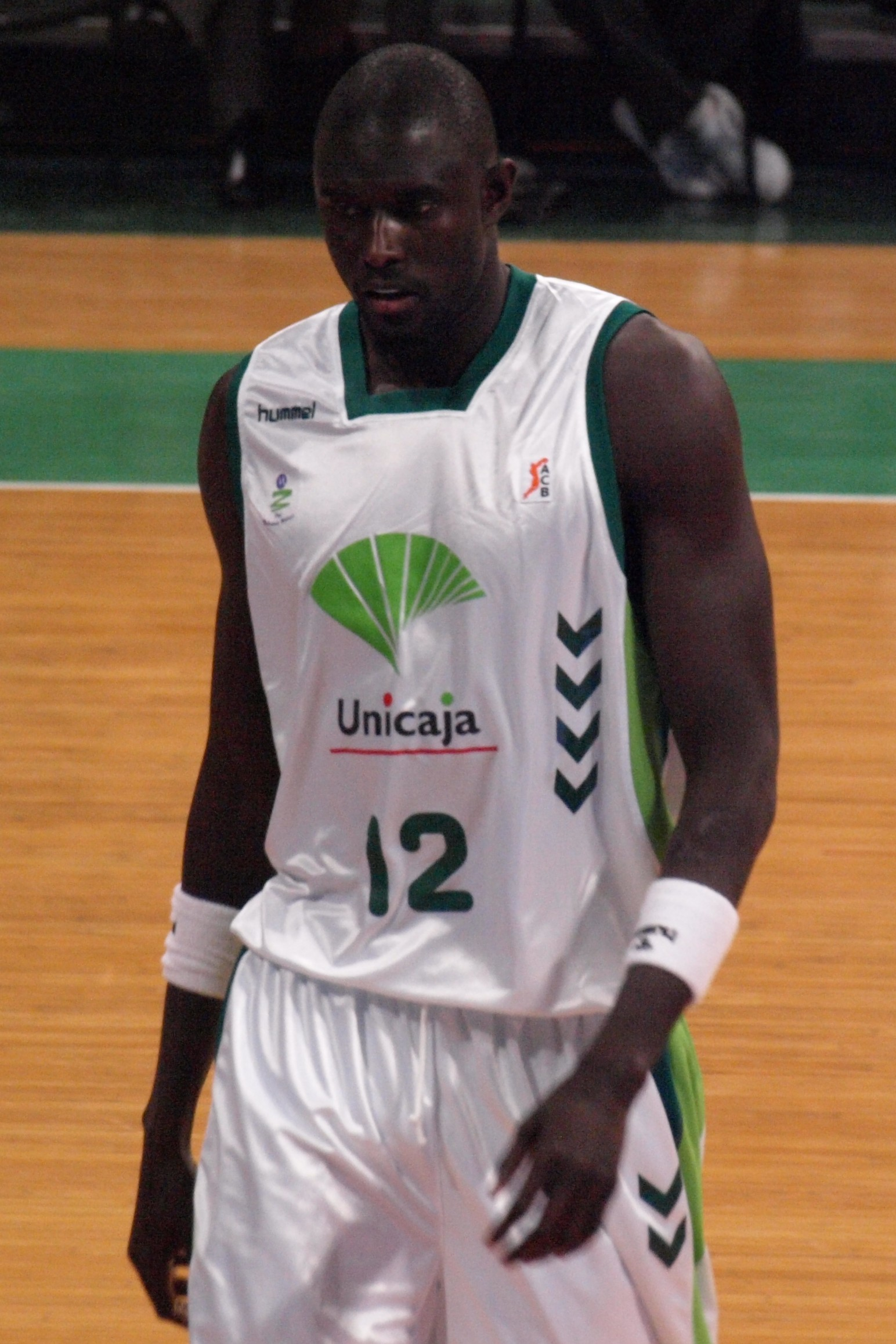
- N'Dong with Unicaja Málaga in 2009

Personal information
- Born: 3 September 1977 (age 49) M'Bour, Senegal
- Listed height: 7 ft 0 in (2.13 m)
- Listed weight: 245 lb (111 kg)

Career information
- NBA draft: 1999: undrafted
- Playing career: 1999–2013
- Position: Center
- Number: 22
- Coaching career: 2015–present

Career history

Playing
- 1999–2000: SpVgg Rattelsdorf
- 2000–2002: TSV Tröster Breitengüßbach
- 2002–2003: TSK uniVersa Bamberg
- 2003–2005: Dijon Basket
- 2005–2006: Los Angeles Clippers
- 2006–2007: Spartak St. Petersburg
- 2007–2009: Unicaja Málaga
- 2009–2012: FC Barcelona Regal
- 2012–2013: Galatasaray Medical Park

Coaching
- 2015–2019: Unicaja Málaga (assistant)
- 2020–present: Senegal

Career highlights
- EuroLeague champion (2010); 2× Spanish League champion (2011, 2012); 2× Spanish Cup winner (2010, 2011); 2× Spanish Supercup winner (2009–2011); Turkish League champion (2013)
- Stats at NBA.com
- Stats at Basketball Reference

Boniface N'Dong (born 3 September 1977) is a Senegalese former basketball player and current coach. Born in M'Bour, Senegal, he also holds German citizenship.

== Professional career ==
N'Dong had previously planned to enter the NCAA with an American college in hopes to gain major exposure. However, due to his weight being under what American colleges were looking for at the time, those plans were ultimately aborted. Instead, as a 21-year-old, N'Dong had to look into an alternative plan for increasing his talents due to Senegal's professional leagues performing less-than-par of expectations for him. During that time, Dallas Mavericks agent Amadou Fall recommended that he train with Dirk Nowitzki's former club and improve his skills there. Sometime in early 1999, N'Dong signed with the SpVgg Rattelsdorf in Germany for one-and-a-half seasons of play there. After being undrafted in 1999, he continued training for the next three years in the TSV Tröster Breitengüßbach to further improve his game. In 2003, he would finally improve his skills to play in the Basketball Bundesliga professional league with the TSK uniVersa Bamberg. After playing a season there, he would sign a two-year deal with the Dijon Basket out in the LNB Pro A. During this time, he would gain further exposure from NBA scouts.

The 2005–06 NBA season would be the first and only NBA season for the 28-year-old 7-ft center to play in the National Basketball Association (NBA) with the Los Angeles Clippers. During this season, N'Dong barely played any notable parts with the team, appearing in 23 games with a 7-minute per game average, starting only once for them. However, the Clippers would ultimately have a surprising season under their belt in his sole season there, making it to the Western Conference semifinals for the first time in franchise history, barely upsetting the Phoenix Suns in the process. In December 2006, he signed with the Russian club Spartak St. Petersburg. N'Dong moved to the Spanish ACB league later that season and signed with Unicaja Málaga for the 2006–07 ACB League play-offs to replace the injured Daniel Santiago. On 14 July 2007 he re-signed with Malaga on a one-season contract. He has also played with the Cleveland Cavaliers NBA Summer League squad in 2007.

In 2009, he signed a two-year contract worth €3.2 million with the Spanish league club FC Barcelona. In 2011, he signed a one-year extension with Regal Barcelona.

In the summer of 2012, he signed a one-year contract with Galatasaray Medical Park. On 16 June 2013, the day after Galatasaray won the 2012–13 league championship, he announced that he was going to retire.

== National team career ==
N'dong helped the Senegal national team get the silver medal at the FIBA Africa Championship 2005 in Algeria, a competition he won the MVP award.

== Coaching career ==
From 2015 until 2019, N'Dong was an assistant coach for Unicaja Málaga. In autumn 2020, N'Dong took over as the head coach of the Senegal national basketball team during the qualifiers for AfroBasket 2021.

== Career statistics ==
Legend
GP	Games played	GS	Games started	MPG	Minutes per game
FG%	Field-goal percentage	3P%	3-point field-goal percentage	FT%	Free-throw percentage
RPG	Rebounds per game	APG	Assists per game	SPG	Steals per game
BPG	Blocks per game	PPG	Points per game	PIR	Performance index rating
**Bold**	Career high

=== NBA ===
==== Regular season ====
Year	Team	GP	GS	MPG	FG%	3P%	FT%	RPG	APG	SPG	BPG	PPG
2005–06	L.A. Clippers	23	1	16.6	.415	.000	.667	1.6	.3	.1	.2	2.2
Career		23	1	16.6	.415	.000	.667	1.6	.3	.1	.2	2.2

=== EuroLeague ===
†	Denotes seasons in which N'Dong won the EuroLeague

Year	Team	GP	GS	MPG	FG%	3P%	FT%	RPG	APG	SPG	BPG	PPG	PIR
2007–08	Málaga	19	7	18.7	.577	.000	.592	5.2	**.5**	.4	**1.4**	8.3	10.7
2008–09	Málaga	15	1	**19.8**	.579	**1.000**	.661	**5.3**	.4	.3	1.3	**10.8**	**12.5**
2009–10†	Barcelona	**21**	**15**	16.4	.600	.000	**.776**	3.6	.3	.4	.9	8.7	9.6
2010–11	Barcelona	20	5	12.0	**.676**	—	.692	2.6	.1	.2	.4	6.8	7.1
2011–12	Barcelona	**21**	9	15.8	.465	—	.727	3.5	.3	**.6**	1.1	5.9	7.2
Career		96	37	16.3	.575	.333	.688	3.9	.3	.4	1.0	7.9	9.2
