= 2013 ACB Playoffs =

The 2013 ACB Playoffs was the final phase of the 2012–13 ACB season. It started on May 23 and ended on June 19. FC Barcelona Regal were the defending champions, and Real Madrid took the 2013 title.

All times are CEST (UTC+02:00).

== Bracket ==
Quarter Finals
1 | Real Madrid | 2
8 | Blu:sens Monbús | 0
4 | Valencia Basket | 1
5 | CAI Zaragoza | 2
2 | Laboral Kutxa | 1
7 | Herbalife Gran Canaria | 2
3 | FC Barcelona Regal | 2
6 | Uxúe Bilbao Basket | 1

Semifinals
1 | Real Madrid | 3
5 | CAI Zaragoza | 0
3 | FC Barcelona Regal | 3
7 | Herbalife Gran Canaria | 0

Finals
1 | Real Madrid | 3
3 | FC Barcelona Regal | 2

== Quarterfinals ==
The quarterfinals are best-of-3 series.

=== Real Madrid vs. Blu:sens Monbús ===
May 24b
19:15

| Real Madrid | 90–75 | Blu:sens Monbús |
Scoring by quarter: 22-25, 28-11, 16-20, 24-19
| Pts: Fernández 17; Rebs: Mirotić 8 Asts: Rodríguez 5 PIR: Mirotić 22 | | Pts: Mejri 15; Rebs: Kendall 8 Asts: Rodríguez, Pumprla 5 PIR: Mejri 17 |
1–0

Palacio de Deportes, Madrid
Attendance: 6,962
Referees: J.R. García Ortiz, L. Guirao, C. Peruga

May 26
12:40

| Blu:sens Monbús | 58–74 | Real Madrid |
Scoring by quarter: 10-16, 23-18, 12-22, 13-18
| Pts: Corbacho 11; Rebs: Pumprla 6 Asts: Freyre 5 PIR: Corbacho 11 | | Pts: Carroll 25; Rebs: Mirotić 9 Asts: Llull 2 PIR: Carroll 22 |
Real Madrid wins series, 2–0

Fontes do Sar, Santiago de Compostela
Attendance: 5,860
Referees: J. C. Garcia Gonzalez, J. Trujillo, Castillo

=== Valencia Basket vs. CAI Zaragoza ===
May 23
20:30

| Valencia Basket | 80–42 | CAI Zaragoza |
Scoring by quarter: 17-11, 20-12, 23-8, 20-11
| Pts: Dubljević 15; Rebs: Faverani 9 Asts: Marković 7 PIR: Dubljević 20 | | Pts: Van Rossom 17; Rebs: Aguilar 7 Asts: three players 2 PIR: Van Rossom 15 |
1–0

Pabellón Municipal Fuente San Luis, Valencia
Attendance: 8,000
Referees: E. Perez Pizarro, Ó. Perea, M.A. Pérez Niz

May 26
12:00

| CAI Zaragoza | 122–120 (3OT) | Valencia Basket |
Scoring by quarter: 21-19, 22-23, 17-27, 30-21, Overtime: 32-30
| Pts: Roll 19; Rebs: Jones, Golubović 7 Asts: Llompart 6 PIR: Van Rossom 21 | | Pts: Doellman 29; Rebs: Doellman 9 Asts: San Miguel, Marković 6 PIR: Doellman 30 |
1–1

Príncipe Felipe Arena, Zaragoza
Attendance: 8,300
Referees: Redondo, M. A. Perez Perez, C. S. Monserrat

May 28
20:30

| Valencia Basket | 77–83 | CAI Zaragoza |
Scoring by quarter: 20-21, 18-14, 18-19, 21-29
| Pts: Doellman 14; Rebs: Faverani, Kelati 7 Asts: Marković 11; PIR: Faverani 17 | | Pts: Roll 19; Rebs: Golubović 10; Asts: Van Rossom, Llompart 3 PIR: Llompart 20 |
CAI Zaragoza wins series, 1–2

Pabellón Municipal Fuente San Luis, Valencia
Attendance: 8,200
Referees: J.A. Martín Bertrán, J.C García González, Castillo

=== Laboral Kutxa vs. Herbalife Gran Canaria ===
May 23
20:15

| Laboral Kutxa | 57–56 | Herbalife Gran Canaria |
Scoring by quarter: 21-21, 9-10, 12-14, 15-11
| Pts: Lampe 15; Rebs: Lampe 10; Asts: Heurtel 6 PIR: Lampe 16 | | Pts: Nelson 16; Rebs: Báez 10; Asts: three players 3 PIR: Nelson 17 |
1–0

Fernando Buesa Arena, Vitoria-Gasteiz
Attendance: 11,518
Referees: A. Conde, B. Jiménez, Martínez Fernández

May 26
13:00

| Herbalife Gran Canaria | 83–78 (OT) | Laboral Kutxa |
Scoring by quarter: 19-18, 13-19, 15-14, 20-16, Overtime: 16-11
| Pts: Toolson 17; Rebs: Báez 8 Asts: Bellas, Nelson 4 PIR: Toolson 20 | | Pts: Nocioni 13; Rebs: Nocioni 12; Asts: Heurtel 5 PIR: Nocioni 24 |
1–1

Centro Insular, Las Palmas de Gran Canaria
Attendance: 4,171
Referees: J.A. Martín Bertrán, V. Bultó, C. Peruga

May 28
20:30

| Laboral Kutxa | 66–72 | Herbalife Gran Canaria |
Scoring by quarter: 13-13, 20-22, 17-16, 16-21
| Pts: Lampe 14; Rebs: Lampe 10; Asts: Causeur 4 PIR: Lampe 14 | | Pts: Toolson 27; Rebs: Bellas 9 Asts: Nelson 3 PIR: Toolson 30 |
Herbalife Gran Canaria wins series, 1–2

Fernando Buesa Arena, Vitoria-Gasteiz
Attendance: 12,182
Referees: E. Pérez Pizarro, Redondo, Carlos Cortés

=== FC Barcelona Regal vs. Uxúe Bilbao Basket ===
May 23
20:45

| FC Barcelona Regal | 88–62 | Uxúe Bilbao Basket |
Scoring by quarter: 27-15, 22-20, 19-11, 20-16
| Pts: Mavrokefalidis 16; Rebs: Sada, Wallace 6 Asts: Tomić 6 PIR: Tomić 25 | | Pts: Hervelle 17; Rebs: Hervelle 8 Asts: Zisis 5 PIR: Hervelle, Grimau 17 |
1–0

Palau Blaugrana, Barcelona
Attendance: 4,793
Referees: D. Hierrezuelo, F.J. Araña, C. Cortés

May 26
12:00

| Uxúe Bilbao Basket | 90–89 | FC Barcelona Regal |
Scoring by quarter: 26-15, 22-15, 18-25, 24-34
| Pts: Hamilton 19; Rebs: Vasileiadis 6 Asts: Zisis 3 PIR: Mumbrú, Grimau 19 | | Pts: Lorbek 20; Rebs: Mavrokefalidis 7 Asts: Tomić 4 PIR: Lorbek 28 |
1–1

Bilbao Arena, Bilbao
Attendance: 6,917
Referees: E. Pérez Pizarro, A. Conde, F. Calatrava

May 28
20:45

| FC Barcelona Regal | 79–70 | Uxúe Bilbao Basket |
Scoring by quarter: 22-17, 11-18, 16-15, 30-20
| Pts: Lorbek 20; Rebs: Lorbek 6 Asts: Huertas 20; PIR: Lorbek 27 | | Pts: Zisis 17; Rebs: Hamilton 11; Asts: three players 3 PIR: Zisis 18 |
FC Barcelona Regal wins series, 2–1

Palau Blaugrana, Barcelona
Attendance: 4,888
Referees: Daniel Hierrezuelo, Jiménez Trujillo, C Sánchez Monserrat

== Semifinals ==
The semifinals are best-of-5 series.

=== Real Madrid vs. CAI Zaragoza ===
May 30
21:00

| Real Madrid | 84–76 | CAI Zaragoza |
Scoring by quarter: 18-16, 24-24, 24-13, 18-23
| Pts: Mirotić 18; Rebs: Mirotić 11; Asts: Rodríguez 5 PIR: Mirotić 26 | | Pts: Rudež 16; Rebs: Golubović, Aguilar 6 Asts: Van Rossom 5 PIR: Rudež 17 |
1–0

Palacio de Deportes, Madrid
Attendance: 7,221
Referees: Juan Carlos Arteaga, M.A. Pérez Pérez, Jorge Martínez

June 1
19:00

| Real Madrid | 93–65 | CAI Zaragoza |
Scoring by quarter: 24-13, 25-22, 25-14, 19-16
| Pts: Carroll 18; Rebs: Mirotić, Begic 6 Asts: Rodríguez 8 PIR: Carroll 21 | | Pts: Llompart 12; Rebs: Roll 5 Asts: Roll 2 PIR: Llompart 14 |
2–0

Palacio de Deportes, Madrid
Attendance: 8,233
Referees: J.A. Martín Bertrán, Oscar Perea, Fernando Calatrava

June 4
21:00

| CAI Zaragoza | 63–77 | Real Madrid |
Scoring by quarter: 14-15, 23-20, 13-18, 13-24
| Pts: Roll 12; Rebs: three players 5 Asts: Van Rossom 4 PIR: three players 9 | | Pts: Mirotić 18; Rebs: Fernández 8 Asts: Fernández 5 PIR: Mirotić 21 |
Real Madrid wins series, 3–0

Príncipe Felipe Arena, Zaragoza
Attendance: 11,000
Referees: Daniel Hierrezuelo, J.C. García González, Lluís Guirao

=== FC Barcelona Regal vs. Herbalife Gran Canaria ===
May 31
21:00

| FC Barcelona Regal | 69–63 | Herbalife Gran Canaria |
Scoring by quarter: 16-21, 13-9, 26-15, 14-18
| Pts: Navarro 14; Rebs: Tomić 8 Asts: Tomić 4 PIR: Wallace 17 | | Pts: Nelson 21; Rebs: Nelson, Báez 11; Asts: Nelson 3 PIR: Nelson 28 |
1–0

Palau Blaugrana, Barcelona
Attendance: 5,198
Referees: Antonio Conde, José Ramón García Ortiz, Carlos Peruga

June 2
12:40

| FC Barcelona Regal | 77–73 | Herbalife Gran Canaria |
Scoring by quarter: 23-20, 17-16, 18-21, 19-16
| Pts: Navarro 22; Rebs: Wallace 6 Asts: Navarro 5 PIR: Navarro 21 | | Pts: Toolson 20; Rebs: Báez 10; Asts: Bellas, Nelson 3 PIR: Newley 19 |
2–0

Palau Blaugrana, Barcelona
Attendance: 4,877
Referees: Redondo, Jiménez Trujillo, Carlos Cortés

June 5
21:00

| Herbalife Gran Canaria | 62–84 | FC Barcelona Regal |
Scoring by quarter: 18-17, 18-22, 12-22, 14-23
| Pts: Báez 13; Rebs: Báez 11; Asts: Bellas, Nelson 3 PIR: Báez 16 | | Pts: Oleson 17; Rebs: Wallace 17; Asts: Huertas 6 PIR: Oleson 20 |
FC Barcelona Regal wins series, 3–0

Centro Insular, Las Palmas de Gran Canaria
Attendance: 5,023
Referees: Emilio Pérez Pizarro, Vicente Bultó, Carlos Peruga

== Finals ==
The finals are best-of-5 series.

=== Real Madrid vs. FC Barcelona Regal ===
June 9
12:40

| Real Madrid | 76–72 | FC Barcelona Regal |
Scoring by quarter: 21-14, 14-31, 15-13, 26-14
| Pts: Rodríguez 21; Rebs: Fernández 8 Asts: Rodríguez 4 PIR: Rodríguez 19 | | Pts: Sada 17; Rebs: Tomić 6 Asts: four players 2 PIR: Sada 16 |
1–0

Palacio de Deportes, Madrid
Attendance: 10,859
Referees: Emilio Pérez Pizarro, Antonio Conde, Carlos Peruga

June 11
21:00

| Real Madrid | 71–72 | FC Barcelona Regal |
Scoring by quarter: 10-11, 26-15, 19-20, 16-26
| Pts: Reyes 13; Rebs: Fernández 10; Asts: Rodríguez 4 PIR: Fernández 23 | | Pts: Navarro 19; Rebs: Tomić, Lorbek 5 Asts: Navarro 5 PIR: Navarro 20 |
1–1

Palacio de Deportes, Madrid
Attendance: 12,348
Referees: Daniel Hierrezuelo, J.C. García González, Carlos Cortés

June 14
22:00

| FC Barcelona Regal | 72–84 | Real Madrid |
Scoring by quarter: 13-17, 22-24, 15-15, 22-28
| Pts: Navarro 20; Rebs: Wallace 6 Asts: Sada 3 PIR: Wallace 13 | | Pts: Reyes 20; Rebs: three players 5 Asts: Llull 5 PIR: Reyes 26 |
1–2

Palau Blaugrana, Barcelona
Attendance: 7,562
Referees: Juan Carlos Arteaga, M.A. Pérez Pérez, Jiménez Trujillo

June 16
19:00

| FC Barcelona Regal | 73–62 | Real Madrid |
Scoring by quarter: 23-17, 11-15, 15-13, 24-17
| Pts: Tomić 18; Rebs: Tomić 11; Asts: Huertas 6 PIR: Tomić 26 | | Pts: Reyes 10; Rebs: Reyes 6 Asts: Fernández, Rodríguez 2 PIR: Reyes 10 |
2–2

Palau Blaugrana, Barcelona
Attendance: 7,219
Referees: Daniel Hierrezuelo, Antonio Conde, J.C. García González

June 19
22:00

| Real Madrid | 79–71 | FC Barcelona Regal |
Scoring by quarter: 20-18, 21-14, 14-16, 24-23
| Pts: Fernandez 15; Rebs: Darden 7 Asts: Llull 5 PIR: Darden 16 | | Pts: Ingles 25; Rebs: three players 6 Asts: Sada 3 PIR: Ingles 28 |
Real Madrid wins series 3–2

Palacio de Deportes, Madrid
Attendance: 12,832
Referees: Juan Carlos Arteaga, Antonio Conde, Jiménez Trujillo

ACB Finals MVP: (Spain) Felipe Reyes

2013 ACB League
Real Madrid
31st title
