= 2011–12 FC Barcelona Bàsquet season =

Spanish basketball club season

FC Barcelona Regal
2011–12 season
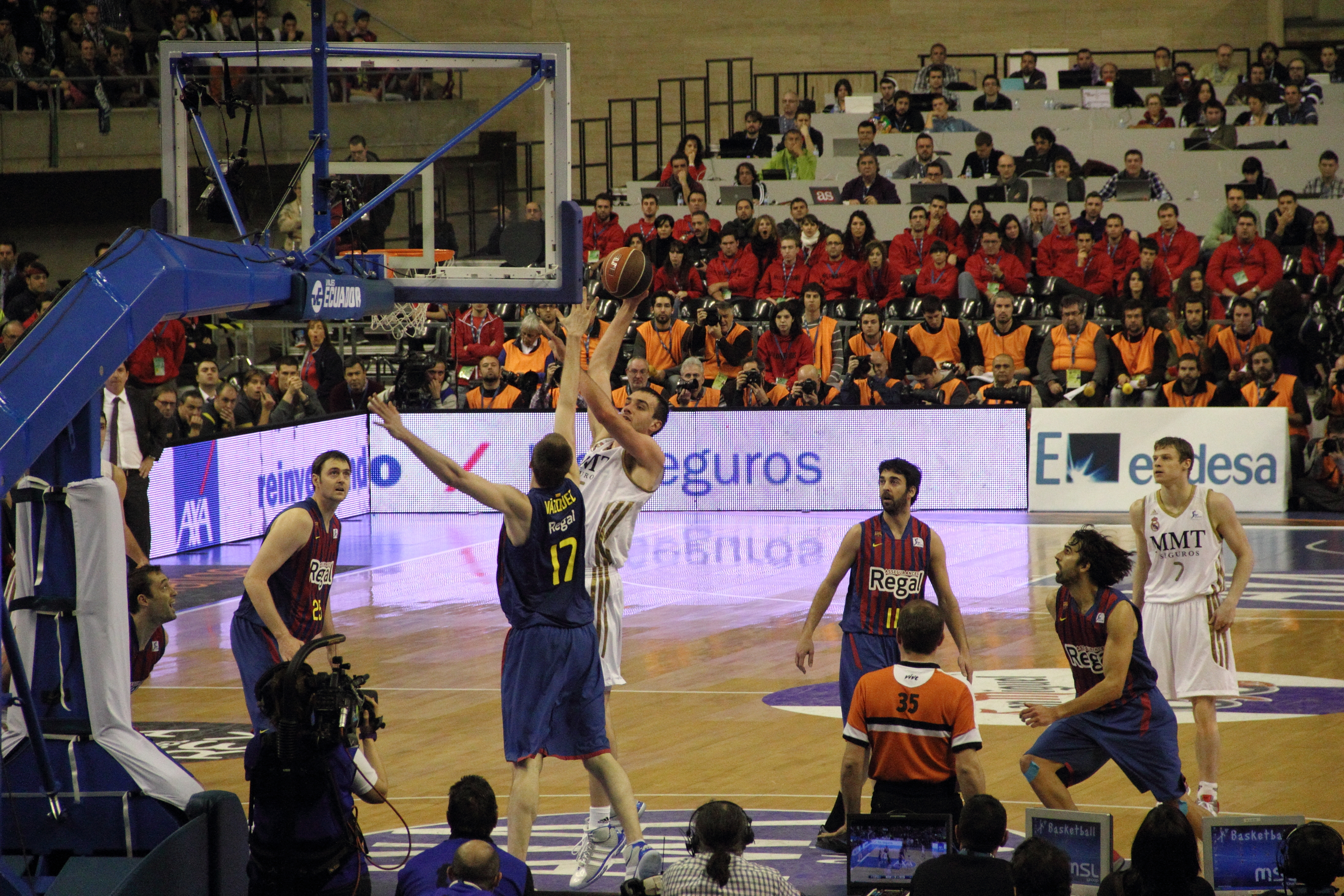
- Barcelona in the 2012 Copa del Rey Final
- Chairman: Sandro Rosell
- Head coach: Xavi Pascual
- Arena: Palau Blaugrana
- Euroleague: Third place
- ACB: Winners
- Copa del Rey: Runners-up
- Supercopa: Winners
- Highest home attendance: 7,691 vs Real Madrid (16 June 2012)
- Biggest win: 97–55 vs Asefa Estudiantes (12 October 2011)
- Biggest defeat: 85–59 vs Real Madrid (11 June 2012)
| Home | Away | Third |

The 2011–12 season of FC Barcelona Bàsquet was the 47th season of the club in the highest division of Spanish basketball and the 29th season in the Liga ACB.

In the 2011–12 season, FC Barcelona competed in the Liga ACB, the Supercopa, the Copa del Rey and the EuroLeague.

== Players ==
=== Roster ===
Note: Flags indicate national team eligibility at FIBA-sanctioned events. Players may hold other non-FIBA nationalities not displayed.

FC Barcelona Regal roster
Players
Coaches

| Pos. | No. | Nat. | Name | Ht. | Wt. | Age |
|---|---|---|---|---|---|---|
| PG | 8 | (Spain) | Sada, Víctor | 1.92 m (6 ft 4 in) | 93 kg (205 lb) | 28 – 8 March 1984 |
| PG | 9 | (Brazil) | Huertas, Marcelinho | 1.91 m (6 ft 3 in) | 84 kg (185 lb) | 29 – 25 May 1983 |
| SG | 11 | (Spain) | Navarro, Juan Carlos (C) | 1.92 m (6 ft 4 in) | 90.5 kg (200 lb) | 32 – 13 June 1980 |
| C | 13 | (Serbia) | Perović, Kosta | 2.17 m (7 ft 1 in) | 118 kg (260 lb) | 27 – 19 February 1985 |
| C | 17 | (Spain) | Vázquez, Fran | 2.08 m (6 ft 10 in) | 105 kg (231 lb) | 29 – 1 May 1983 |
| PF/C | 18 | (United States) | Wallace, Judson | 2.06 m (6 ft 9 in) | 109 kg (240 lb) | 29 – 31 December 1982 |
| G/F | 20 | (Australia) | Ingles, Joe | 2.03 m (6 ft 8 in) | 100 kg (220 lb) | 24 – 2 October 1987 |
| C | 21 | (Senegal) | N'Dong, Boniface | 2.13 m (7 ft 0 in) | 111 kg (245 lb) | 34 – 3 September 1977 |
| G/F | 22 | (Spain) | Rabaseda, Xavi | 1.98 m (6 ft 6 in) | 93 kg (205 lb) | 23 – 24 February 1989 |
| PF/C | 25 | (Slovenia) | Lorbek, Erazem | 2.08 m (6 ft 10 in) | 113 kg (249 lb) | 28 – 21 February 1984 |
| G/F | 31 | (United States) | Eidson, Chuck | 2.03 m (6 ft 8 in) | 100 kg (220 lb) | 31 – 10 October 1980 |
| SF | 33 | (United States) | Mickeal, Pete | 2.01 m (6 ft 7 in) | 109 kg (240 lb) | 34 – 22 February 1978 |

Head coach

- (Spain) Xavier Pascual

Assistant coach(es)

- (Spain) Agustín Julbé
- (Spain) Iñigo Zorzano
- (Spain) David García

Legend

- (C) Team captain
- Injured

- Roster

=== Depth chart ===
| Pos. | Starting 5 | Bench 1 | Bench 2 |
|---|---|---|---|
| C | Fran Vázquez † | Boniface N'Dong | Kosta Perović |
| PF | Erazem Lorbek | C. J. Wallace |
| SF | Pete Mickeal * | Joe Ingles |
| SG | Juan Carlos Navarro † | Chuck Eidson * | Xavi Rabaseda † |
| PG | Marcelinho Huertas | Víctor Sada † |

Notes: Blue † – homegrown player; Red * – overseas player; Green ‡ – youth player

=== In ===
| No. | Pos. | Nat. | Name | Age | Moving from | | Type | Ends | Transfer fee | Date | Source |
|---|---|---|---|---|---|---|---|---|---|---|---|
| 22 | G/F | (Spain) | Xavi Rabaseda | 22 | Fuenlabrada | (Spain) | Free agency | 2014 | – | 11 June 2011 | |
| 31 | G/F | (United States) | Chuck Eidson | 31 | Maccabi Tel Aviv | (Israel) | Free agency | 2013 | – | 22 June 2011 | |
| 9 | PG | (Brazil) (Italy) | Marcelinho Huertas | 29 | Laboral Kutxa | (Spain) | Parted ways | 2015 | – | 9 August 2011 | |
| 18 | PF | (United States) (Republic of the Congo) | CJ Wallace | 28 | Gran Canaria | (Spain) | Free agency | 2013 | – | 7 September 2011 | |

=== Out ===
| No. | Pos. | Nat. | Name | Age | Moving to | | Type | Transfer fee | Date | Source |
|---|---|---|---|---|---|---|---|---|---|---|
| 10 | PG | (Slovenia) | Jaka Lakovič | 32 | Galatasaray | (Turkey) | End of contract | – | 11 June 2011 | |
| 44 | G/F | (Spain) | Roger Grimau | 32 | Bilbao | (Spain) | End of contract | – | 11 June 2011 | |
| 9 | PG | (Spain) | Ricky Rubio | 20 | Minnesota Timberwolves | (United States) | End of contract | – | 17 June 2012 | |
| 5 | CG | (Italy) | Gianluca Basile | 36 | Cantù | (Italy) | Parted ways | – | 21 June 2011 | |
| 32 | G/F | (United States) | Alan Anderson | 29 | Shandong Lions | (China) | End of contract | – | 22 June 2011 | |
| 23 | PF | (United States) | Terence Morris | 32 | | | Retirement | – | 22 June 2011 | |

== Pre-season and friendlies ==
=== Friendly matches ===
| 4 September 2011 Torneig Festa Major | Assignia Manresa | 75–86 | FC Barcelona Regal | Sabadell |
| | Scoring by quarter: 24–21, 15–21, 9–18, 27–26 |
| | Pts: Doellman 16 | | Pts: Rabaseda 23 | Arena: Pavelló Nord |

| 11 September 2011 | Stanford Cardinals | 70–85 | FC Barcelona Regal | Vic |
| | Scoring by quarter: 22–18, 10–26, 19–19, 19–22 |
| | Pts: Randle 16 | Report | Pts: Eidson 28 | Arena: Pavelló Castell d'en Planes |

| 15 September 2011 | FC Barcelona Regal | 81–64 | BC Khimki Moscow | Palamós |
| | Scoring by quarter: 20–13, 19–14, 25–25, 17–12 |
| | Pts: Mickeal 28 | Report | Pts: Vyaltsev 17 | Arena: Pavelló Municipal d'Esports |

| 19 September 2011 | Tarragona Bàsquet 2017 | 55–90 | FC Barcelona Regal | Tarragona |
| | Scoring by quarter: 15–24, 12–28, 17–16, 11–22 |
| | Pts: Fernández 12 | Report | Pts: Eidson 18 | Arena: Pavelló del Serrallo |

| 5 October 2011 | FC Barcelona Regal | 85–40 | Huracanes de Tampico | Montcada i Reixac |
| | Pts: Ingles 17 | Report | | Arena: Pavelló Municipal Miquel Poblet |

=== Lliga Catalana de Bàsquet ===
| 25 September 2011 Semifinal | FC Barcelona Regal | 81–64 | Lleida Bàsquet | Manresa |
| 17:00 | Scoring by quarter: 22–12, 19–18, 18–20, 22–14 |
| | Pts: N'Dong 18; Rebs: N'Dong, Sada 5 Asts: Huertas 7 PIR: N'Dong 24 | Boxscore | Pts: Ramsdell 19; Rebs: Ramsdell 8 Asts: Norris 3 PIR: Ramsdell 21 | Arena: Nou Congost; Referees: Juan Carlos Mitjana, Lluís Guirao, Pedro Munar |

| 26 September 2011 Final | FIATC Joventut | 54–94 | FC Barcelona Regal | Manresa |
| 20:45 | Scoring by quarter: 18–18, 14–31, 15–26, 7–19 |
| | Pts: Jeter 14; Rebs: Williams 10; Asts: Jeter 3 PIR: Williams 14 | Boxscore | Pts: N'Dong 15; Rebs: Wallace 6 Asts: Eidson, Ingles 3 PIR: N'Dong 23 | Arena: Nou Congost; Referees: Juan Carlos Mitjana, Òscar Perea, Lluís Guirao |

== Competitions ==
=== Overview ===
| Competition | First match | Last match | Starting round | Final position | Record | | | | | | | |
| Competition | First match | Last match | Starting round | Final position | Pld | W | D | L | PF | PA | PD | Win % |
|---|---|---|---|---|---|---|---|---|---|---|---|---|
| Liga ACB | 9 October 2011 | 16 June 2012 | Round 1 | Winners | 45 | 37 | | 8 | 3,476 | 2,991 | +485 | 82.22 |
| EuroLeague | 20 October 2011 | 13 May 2012 | Round 1 | Third place | 21 | 19 | | 2 | 1,572 | 1,305 | +267 | 90.48 |
| Copa del Rey | 16 February 2012 | 19 February 2012 | Quarterfinals | Runners-up | 3 | 2 | | 1 | 215 | 202 | +13 | 66.67 |
| Supercopa | 30 September 2011 | 1 October 2011 | Semifinals | Winners | 2 | 2 | | 0 | 156 | 143 | +13 | 100.00 |
| Total | | | | | 71 | 60 | 0 | 11 | 5,419 | 4,641 | +778 | 84.51 |

Last updated: 27 December 2025
Source: Competitions

=== Liga ACB ===
==== League table ====
| # | Teams | P | W | L | PF | PA | Qualification or relegation |
|---|---|---|---|---|---|---|---|
| 1 | FC Barcelona Regal | 34 | 29 | 5 | 2639 | 2232 | Qualified for the Playoffs |
| 2 | Real Madrid | 34 | 26 | 8 | 2829 | 2513 | Qualified for the Playoffs |
| 3 | Caja Laboral | 34 | 23 | 11 | 2545 | 2384 | Qualified for the Playoffs |
| 4 | Valencia Basket | 34 | 20 | 14 | 2531 | 2401 | Qualified for the Playoffs |
| 5 | Lagun Aro GBC | 34 | 19 | 15 | 2664 | 2578 | Qualified for the Playoffs |

Source: ACB

==== Results summary ====
| Overall | | | | | | Home | | | | | Away | | | | |
| Pld | W | L | PF | PA | PD | W | L | PF | PA | PD | W | L | PF | PA | PD |
|---|---|---|---|---|---|---|---|---|---|---|---|---|---|---|---|
| 34 | 29 | 5 | 2639 | 2232 | +407 | 16 | 1 | 1340 | 1090 | +250 | 13 | 4 | 1299 | 1142 | +157 |

Source: Competitive matches

==== Results by round ====
| Round | 1 | 2 | 3 | 4 | 5 | 6 | 7 | 8 | 9 | 10 | 11 | 12 | 13 | 14 | 15 | 16 | 17 | 18 | 19 | 20 | 21 | 22 | 23 | 24 | 25 | 26 | 27 | 28 | 29 | 30 | 31 | 32 | 33 | 34 |
|---|---|---|---|---|---|---|---|---|---|---|---|---|---|---|---|---|---|---|---|---|---|---|---|---|---|---|---|---|---|---|---|---|---|---|
| Ground | A | H | A | H | A | H | A | H | A | H | H | A | H | A | H | A | H | H | A | A | H | A | H | A | H | A | H | A | H | A | H | A | H | A |
| Result | W | W | L | W | W | W | W | W | W | W | W | L | W | L | W | W | W | W | W | W | W | W | L | L | W | W | W | W | W | W | W | W | W | W |
| Position | 5 | 1 | 2 | 2 | 1 | 1 | 1 | 1 | 1 | 1 | 1 | 2 | 1 | 2 | 2 | 2 | 2 | 2 | 1 | 1 | 1 | 1 | 2 | 2 | 2 | 1 | 1 | 1 | 1 | 1 | 1 | 1 | 1 | 1 |

Source: Competitive matches
A = Away; H = Home; W = Win; L = Loss; R = Rest

==== Matches ====
| 9 October 2011 1 | UCAM Murcia CB | 54–62 | FC Barcelona Regal | Barcelona |
| 12:30 | Scoring by quarter: 14–18, 11–17, 15–13, 14–14 |
| | Pts: Augustine 19; Rebs: Augustine 14; Asts: Augustine, Miso 2 PIR: Augustine 32 | Boxscore | Pts: Lorbek 14; Rebs: Vázquez 7 Asts: Huertas 4 PIR: N'Dong 14 | Arena: Palau Blaugrana; Attendance: 4,800; Referees: Juan Luis Redondo, Carlos Peruga, Antonio Sacristán |

| 12 October 2011 2 | FC Barcelona Regal | 97–51 | Asefa Estudiantes | Barcelona |
| 20:00 | Scoring by quarter: 31–19, 16–16, 28–11, 22–5 |
| | Pts: N'Dong 21; Rebs: N'Dong 8 Asts: Sada 6 PIR: N'Dong 29 | Boxscore | Pts: Gabriel 19; Rebs: Jiménez 6 Asts: Granger 6 PIR: Gabriel 19 | Arena: Palau Blaugrana; Attendance: 5,126; Referees: Francisco De la Maza, Carlos Cortés, Luis Miguel Castillo |

| 16 October 2011 3 | Cajasol | 81–75 | FC Barcelona Regal | Seville |
| 18:00 | Scoring by quarter: 22–25, 16–9, 20–12, 23–29 |
| | Pts: Urtasun 23; Rebs: Davis 7 Asts: Davis 3 PIR: Urtasun 17 | Boxscore | Pts: Eidson 19; Rebs: Eidson 9 Asts: Eidson, Navarro 4 PIR: Eidson 29 | Arena: Deportes San Pablo; Attendance: 6,800; Referees: Antonio Conde, Vicente Bultó, Miguel Ángel Pérez Niz |

| 23 October 2011 4 | FC Barcelona Regal | 91–72 | Gescrap Bizkaia | Barcelona |
| 18:00 | Scoring by quarter: 24–14, 28–22, 16–14, 23–22 |
| | Pts: Navarro 27; Rebs: Mickeal 8 Asts: Huertas 5 PIR: Navarro 28 | Boxscore | Pts: Fischer 13; Rebs: Hampl 7 Asts: López 6 PIR: Fischer 13 | Arena: Palau Blaugrana; Attendance: 5,274; Referees: Daniel Hierrezuelo, Benjamín Jiménez, Jorge Martínez |

| 30 October 2011 5 | Mad-Croc Fuenlabrada | 56–66 | FC Barcelona Regal | Fuenlabrada |
| 12:30 | Scoring by quarter: 13–24, 13–17, 15–14, 15–11 |
| | Pts: Mainoldi 14; Rebs: Mainoldi, Sánchez 7 Asts: three players 2 PIR: Mainoldi 16 | Boxscore | Pts: Navarro 21; Rebs: N'Dong 10; Asts: Huertas 5 PIR: Navarro 21 | Arena: Fernando Martín; Attendance: 5,544; Referees: José Antonio Martín Bertrán, José Javier Murgui, Juan José Martínez Díez |

| 6 November 2011 6 | FC Barcelona Regal | 82–70 | FIATC Joventut | Barcelona |
| 12:30 | Scoring by quarter: 21–11, 20–26, 21–15, 20–18 |
| | Pts: N'Dong 20; Rebs: N'Dong 10; Asts: Huertas 8 PIR: N'Dong 35 | Boxscore | Pts: Báez 19; Rebs: Báez 7 Asts: three players 2 PIR: Báez 26 | Arena: Palau Blaugrana; Attendance: 5,087; Referees: Óscar Perea, Francisco Araña, Fernando Calatrava |

| 13 November 2011 7 | Valencia Basket | 68–72 | FC Barcelona Regal | Valencia |
| 18:30 | Scoring by quarter: 19–18, 8–19, 18–21, 23–14 |
| | Pts: Martínez 16; Rebs: Lishchuk 8 Asts: Marković 5 PIR: Caner-Medley 16 | Boxscore | Pts: Navarro 14; Rebs: Perović 6 Asts: Navarro 7 PIR: Navarro 16 | Arena: La Fonteta; Attendance: 9,000; Referees: Juan Luis Redondo, Juan Carlos García González, Carlos Cortés |

| 20 November 2011 8 | FC Barcelona Regal | 77–67 | Blancos de Rueda Valladolid | Barcelona |
| 12:30 | Scoring by quarter: 23–21, 20–16, 15–13, 19–17 |
| | Pts: Lorbek 17; Rebs: N'Dong 9 Asts: Navarro 5 PIR: Lorbek 21 | Boxscore | Pts: Robinson 12; Rebs: Martín, Robinson 6 Asts: Dumas 4 PIR: Dumas, Robinson 14 | Arena: Palau Blaugrana; Attendance: 4,359; Referees: Miguel Ángel Pérez Pérez, Vicente Bultó, Pedro Munar |

| 27 November 2011 9 | Blu:sens Monbus | 83–89 | FC Barcelona Regal | Santiago de Compostela |
| 12:30 | Scoring by quarter: 20–17, 20–18, 24–25, 19–29 |
| | Pts: Ere 18; Rebs: Lasme 9 Asts: Rodríguez 6 PIR: Ere 25 | Boxscore | Pts: Navarro 22; Rebs: Wallace 8 Asts: Huertas 4 PIR: Navarro 22 | Arena: Fontes do Sar; Attendance: 5,200; Referees: Francisco De la Maza, Óscar Perea, David Soto |

| 4 December 2011 10 | FC Barcelona Regal | 65–49 | Gran Canaria 2014 | Barcelona |
| 12:30 | Scoring by quarter: 15–13, 21–11, 18–12, 11–13 |
| | Pts: Navarro 12; Rebs: Vázquez 11; Asts: Lorbek, Navarro 3 PIR: Vázquez 17 | Boxscore | Pts: Bellas, Nelson 8 Rebs: Palacios 8 Asts: Green 3 PIR: Palacios 12 | Arena: Palau Blaugrana; Attendance: 4,380; Referees: Juan Carlos Mitjana, Carlos Sánchez Monserrat, Miguel Ángel Pérez Niz |

| 11 December 2011 11 | FC Barcelona Regal | 72–62 | Unicaja | Barcelona |
| 18:00 | Scoring by quarter: 14–19, 25–14, 27–15, 6–14 |
| | Pts: Eidson 19; Rebs: N'Dong 9 Asts: Huertas 3 PIR: Eidson 22 | Boxscore | Pts: Fitch 19; Rebs: Freeland 9 Asts: Rowland, Valters 2 PIR: Fitch 23 | Arena: Palau Blaugrana; Attendance: 4,599; Referees: Juan Luis Redondo, Juan Carlos García González, Jorge Martínez |

| 18 December 2011 12 | Caja Laboral | 71–60 | FC Barcelona Regal | Vitoria-Gasteiz |
| 19:30 | Scoring by quarter: 17–8, 12–14, 22–24, 20–14 |
| | Pts: Bjelica 17; Rebs: Teletović 7 Asts: Prigioni, San Emeterio 3 PIR: Teletović 24 | Boxscore | Pts: Eidson 15; Rebs: Vázquez 8 Asts: Sada 3 PIR: Vázquez 17 | Arena: Iradier Arena; Attendance: 8,416; Referees: Emilio Pérez Pizarro, José Ramón García Ortiz, Carlos Peruga |

| 28 December 2011 13 | FC Barcelona Regal | 74–61 | Assignia Manresa | Barcelona |
| 20:45 | Scoring by quarter: 17–17, 15–11, 26–19, 16–14 |
| | Pts: Eidson 14; Rebs: N'Dong 11; Asts: Sada 4 PIR: Sada 16 | Boxscore | Pts: Doellman 12; Rebs: Downs 7 Asts: Montañez 4 PIR: Downs, Hanga 16 | Arena: Palau Blaugrana; Attendance: 4,957; Referees: Antonio Conde, Vicente Bultó, Rubén Sánchez Mohedas |

| 4 January 2012 14 | Real Madrid | 78–74 | FC Barcelona Regal | Madrid |
| 20:45 | Scoring by quarter: 18–16, 30–20, 14–22, 16–16 |
| | Pts: Carroll, Tomić 16; Rebs: Tomić 8 Asts: Llull, Rodríguez 4 PIR: Suárez 18 | Boxscore | Pts: Mickeal 14; Rebs: N'Dong 12; Asts: Huertas 7 PIR: N'Dong 19 | Arena: WiZink Center; Attendance: 12,888; Referees: Daniel Hierrezuelo, Benjamín Jiménez, Carlos Cortés |

| 8 January 2012 15 | FC Barcelona Regal | 65–49 | Lucentum Alicante | Barcelona |
| 12:30 | Scoring by quarter: 15–11, 16–9, 15–13, 19–16 |
| | Pts: Huertas 13; Rebs: Ingles, N'Dong 8 Asts: three players 2 PIR: Ingles 15 | Boxscore | Pts: Dewar, Ellis 11; Rebs: Barnes 7 Asts: Ellis 3 PIR: Stojić 8 | Arena: Palau Blaugrana; Attendance: 4,079; Referees: Xavier Amorós, Francisco Araña, Miguel Ángel Pérez Niz |

| 15 January 2012 16 | Lagun Aro GBC | 56–71 | FC Barcelona Regal | San Sebastián |
| 12:30 | Scoring by quarter: 16–19, 17–24, 16–12, 7–16 |
| | Pts: Panko 20; Rebs: Doblas 10; Asts: Neto, Vidal 3 PIR: Panko 12 | Boxscore | Pts: Mickeal 17; Rebs: Huertas, Mickeal 6 Asts: Huertas 3 PIR: Mickeal 21 | Arena: Donostia Arena; Attendance: 8,130; Referees: Francisco De la Maza, Óscar Perea, Carlos Sánchez Monserrat |

| 22 January 2012 17 | FC Barcelona Regal | 71–68 | CAI Zaragoza | Barcelona |
| 12:15 | Scoring by quarter: 18–15, 16–20, 17–12, 20–21 |
| | Pts: Navarro 17; Rebs: Vázquez 7 Asts: Eidson 4 PIR: Navarro 21 | Boxscore | Pts: Cabezas 14; Rebs: Archibald 8 Asts: Cabezas, Stefánsson 4 PIR: Cabezas 22 | Arena: Palau Blaugrana; Attendance: 4,894; Referees: José Ramón García Ortiz, José Javier Murgui, Anna Cardús |

| 29 January 2012 18 | FC Barcelona Regal | 90–53 | UCAM Murcia CB | Barcelona |
| 20:00 | Scoring by quarter: 10–13, 25–8, 34–14, 21–18 |
| | Pts: Lorbek 17; Rebs: Vázquez 10; Asts: Eidson 7 PIR: Vázquez 24 | Boxscore | Pts: Augustine 22; Rebs: Kurz 9 Asts: Udoka 5 PIR: Augustine 23 | Arena: Palau Blaugrana; Attendance: 3,577; Referees: Daniel Hierrezuelo, Lluís Guirao, Juan José Martínez Díez |

| 5 February 2012 19 | Asefa Estudiantes | 65–80 | FC Barcelona Regal | Madrid |
| 12:30 | Scoring by quarter: 14–23, 17–15, 21–17, 13–25 |
| | Pts: Lofton 17; Rebs: Jiménez 8 Asts: Granger 2 PIR: Gabriel 17 | Boxscore | Pts: Eidson, Navarro 15; Rebs: Mickeal, N'Dong 5 Asts: three players 4 PIR: Eidson 21 | Arena: WiZink Center; Attendance: 12,000; Referees: Juan Luis Redondo, Vicente Bultó, Luis Miguel Castillo |

| 12 February 2012 20 | FIATC Joventut | 52–79 | FC Barcelona Regal | Badalona |
| 12:30 | Scoring by quarter: 11–13, 12–21, 12–16, 17–29 |
| | Pts: Norel 12; Rebs: Williams 9 Asts: Jeter 3 PIR: Norel 14 | Boxscore | Pts: Rabaseda 14; Rebs: N'Dong 8 Asts: Huertas 7 PIR: Rabaseda 16 | Arena: Olímpic de Badalona; Attendance: 8,340; Referees: Antonio Conde, Francisco Araña, Pedro Munar |

| 26 February 2012 21 | FC Barcelona Regal | 86–59 | Mad-Croc Fuenlabrada | Barcelona |
| 12:30 | Scoring by quarter: 26–13, 19–18, 24–12, 17–16 |
| | Pts: Lorbek 19; Rebs: Wallace 11; Asts: Huertas, Sada 5 PIR: Lorbek 21 | Boxscore | Pts: Penney 12; Rebs: Diouf 7 Asts: Colom, Cortaberría 2 PIR: Diouf 13 | Arena: Palau Blaugrana; Attendance: 4,519; Referees: Juan Carlos Arteaga, Carlos Cortés, Jacobo Rial |

| 4 March 2012 22 | Gescrap Bizkaia | 65–72 | FC Barcelona Regal | Bilbao |
| 20:00 | Scoring by quarter: 6–23, 22–21, 16–17, 21–11 |
| | Pts: Vasileiadis 22; Rebs: Mavroeidis 7 Asts: Grimau 3 PIR: Vasileiadis 22 | Boxscore | Pts: Lorbek 15; Rebs: N'Dong 5 Asts: Navarro 6 PIR: Vázquez 16 | Arena: Bilbao Arena; Attendance: 10,014; Referees: Emilio Pérez Pizarro, Benjamín Jiménez, Jorge Martínez |

| 8 March 2012 23 | FC Barcelona Regal | 63–66 | Cajasol | Barcelona |
| 21:00 | Scoring by quarter: 18–22, 22–17, 11–12, 12–15 |
| | Pts: Mickeal, Rabaseda 12; Rebs: N'Dong 7 Asts: Huertas 3 PIR: Rabaseda 14 | Boxscore | Pts: Rubio 13; Rebs: Davis 10; Asts: Calloway 4 PIR: Calloway 19 | Arena: Palau Blaugrana; Attendance: 3,544; Referees: Antonio Conde, Carlos Peruga, Carlos Sánchez Monserrat |

| 11 March 2012 24 | Gran Canaria 2014 | 93–90(OT) | FC Barcelona Regal | Las Palmas |
| 12:30 | Scoring by quarter: 20–15, 23–19, 18–17, 13–23, Overtime: 19–16 |
| | Pts: Nelson 15; Rebs: Beirán 8 Asts: Bellas, Nelson 5 PIR: Nelson 23 | Boxscore | Pts: Navarro 21; Rebs: Lorbek 8 Asts: Lorbek 3 PIR: Lorbek 25 | Arena: Centro Insular de Deportes; Attendance: 4,822; Referees: Juan Carlos Mitjana, José Javier Murgui, Luis Miguel Castillo |

| 17 March 2012 25 | FC Barcelona Regal | 71–58 | Blu:sens Monbus | Barcelona |
| 20:00 | Scoring by quarter: 20–7, 14–15, 17–19, 20–17 |
| | Pts: N'Dong 21; Rebs: Lorbek, Mickeal 6 Asts: Mickeal 3 PIR: N'Dong 24 | Boxscore | Pts: Lasme 17; Rebs: Kendall, Lasme 6 Asts: Rodríguez 4 PIR: Bulfoni 13 | Arena: Palau Blaugrana; Attendance: 3,405; Referees: José Ramón García Ortiz, Lluís Guirao, David Soto |

| 24 March 2012 26 | Blancos de Rueda Valladolid | 86–92(OT) | FC Barcelona Regal | Valladolid |
| 20:30 | Scoring by quarter: 23–20, 15–15, 11–18, 25–21, Overtime: 12–18 |
| | Pts: García 23; Rebs: Borchardt 9 Asts: Úriz 3 PIR: Borchardt 18 | Boxscore | Pts: Navarro 23; Rebs: Vázquez 9 Asts: Huertas 3 PIR: Lorbek 28 | Arena: Polideportivo Pisuerga; Attendance: 4,700; Referees: Francisco De la Maza, Vicente Bultó, Miguel Ángel Pérez Niz |

| 1 April 2012 27 | FC Barcelona Regal | 76–72 | Valencia Basket | Barcelona |
| 12:30 | Scoring by quarter: 17–23, 29–10, 14–22, 16–17 |
| | Pts: Navarro 17; Rebs: Vázquez 8 Asts: Ingles 6 PIR: Navarro 19 | Boxscore | Pts: de Colo 18; Rebs: Caner-Medley 7 Asts: de Colo, Martínez 3 PIR: de Colo, Faverani 18 | Arena: Palau Blaugrana; Attendance: 4,277; Referees: Juan Carlos Arteaga, Juan Carlos García González, Jorge Martínez |

| 8 April 2012 28 | CAI Zaragoza | 49–68 | FC Barcelona Regal | Zaragoza |
| 18:30 | Scoring by quarter: 13–18, 11–12, 14–19, 11–19 |
| | Pts: Stefánsson 13; Rebs: Rhodes 12; Asts: Cabezas 3 PIR: Rhodes 14 | Boxscore | Pts: N'Dong 17; Rebs: Huertas, N'Dong 9 Asts: three players 3 PIR: N'Dong 26 | Arena: Príncipe Felipe; Attendance: 9,400; Referees: Juan Carlos Mitjana, Antonio Conde, Carlos Sánchez Monserrat |

| 15 April 2012 29 | FC Barcelona Regal | 77–61 | Lagun Aro GBC | Barcelona |
| 12:30 | Scoring by quarter: 23–16, 20–14, 12–14, 22–17 |
| | Pts: Navarro 17; Rebs: three players 6 Asts: Navarro 5 PIR: Navarro, Vázquez 18 | Boxscore | Pts: Panko 16; Rebs: Betts 8 Asts: Panko, Salgado 2 PIR: Betts 15 | Arena: Palau Blaugrana; Attendance: 5,136; Referees: Juan Luis Redondo, Óscar Perea, Carlos Cortés |

| 22 April 2012 30 | Unicaja | 57–89 | FC Barcelona Regal | Málaga |
| 18:00 | Scoring by quarter: 16–27, 11–21, 14–20, 16–21 |
| | Pts: Freeland 18; Rebs: Freeland, Lima 5 Asts: DeVries, Rodríguez 2 PIR: Freeland 10 | Boxscore | Pts: N'Dong 21; Rebs: N'Dong 12; Asts: Mickeal, Navarro 5 PIR: N'Dong 31 | Arena: Martín Carpena; Attendance: 10,500; Referees: José Antonio Martín Bertrán, Miguel Ángel Pérez Pérez, Jacobo Rial |

| 26 April 2012 31 | FC Barcelona Regal | 97–89 | Caja Laboral | Barcelona |
| 20:00 | Scoring by quarter: 27–17, 19–25, 28–27, 23–20 |
| | Pts: Navarro 31; Rebs: Lorbek, N'Dong 5 Asts: Navarro 10; PIR: Navarro 42 | Boxscore | Pts: Lampe 31; Rebs: Lampe, Teletović 5 Asts: Heurtel 7 PIR: Lampe 33 | Arena: Palau Blaugrana; Attendance: 4,326; Referees: Juan Carlos Arteaga, Benjamín Jiménez, Carlos Sánchez Monserrat |

| 29 April 2012 32 | Lucentum Alicante | 57–83 | FC Barcelona Regal | Alacant |
| 19:00 | Scoring by quarter: 14–22, 10–19, 18–21, 15–21 |
| | Pts: Urtasun 9 Rebs: Ivanov 5 Asts: Luz 3 PIR: Ivanov 15 | Boxscore | Pts: Eidson, Mickeal 13; Rebs: three players 5 Asts: Eidson 7 PIR: Eidson 21 | Arena: Centro de Tecnificación; Attendance: 4,910; Referees: Daniel Hierrezuelo, Francisco Araña, Juan José Martínez Díez |

| 3 May 2012 33 | FC Barcelona Regal | 86–83 | Real Madrid | Barcelona |
| 20:45 | Scoring by quarter: 17–28, 25–20, 19–20, 25–15 |
| | Pts: Navarro 23; Rebs: three players 6 Asts: Sada 6 PIR: Eidson 21 | Boxscore | Pts: Tomić 17; Rebs: Tomić 9 Asts: Llull 6 PIR: Tomić 28 | Arena: Palau Blaugrana; Attendance: 6,577; Referees: Emilio Pérez Pizarro, Vicente Bultó, Fernando Calatrava |

| 6 May 2012 34 | Assignia Manresa | 71–77 | FC Barcelona Regal | Manresa |
| 12:30 | Scoring by quarter: 18–32, 19–14, 12–12, 22–19 |
| | Pts: Asselin 18; Rebs: three players 6 Asts: Rodríguez 5 PIR: Hanga 15 | Boxscore | Pts: N'Dong 17; Rebs: Eidson, N'Dong 5 Asts: Huertas, Ingles 5 PIR: N'Dong 21 | Arena: Nou Congost; Attendance: 4,800; Referees: Juan Carlos Mitjana, Carlos Peruga, Anna Cardús |

=== ACB Playoffs ===
==== Quarterfinals ====
| 17 May 2012 1 | FC Barcelona Regal | 73–43 | Lucentum Alicante | Barcelona |
| 20:45 | Scoring by quarter: 21–6, 14–14, 17–14, 21–9 |
| | Pts: Huertas 14; Rebs: N'Dong 7 Asts: Huertas 6 PIR: Huertas 18 | Boxscore | Pts: Stojić 17; Rebs: Ivanov 13; Asts: Ivanov 4 PIR: Ivanov 22 | Arena: Palau Blaugrana; Attendance: 3,886; Referees: Francisco De la Maza, Juan Carlos García González, Juan José Martínez Díez |

| 20 May 2012 2 | Lucentum Alicante | 57–84 | FC Barcelona Regal | Alacant |
| 12:30 | Scoring by quarter: 13–24, 21–18, 15–15, 8–27 |
| | Pts: Llompart 16; Rebs: Ivanov 10; Asts: Stojić 3 PIR: Ivanov 14 | Boxscore | Pts: N'Dong 14; Rebs: Mickeal 6 Asts: four players 2 PIR: N'Dong 19 | Arena: Centro de Tecnificación; Attendance: 3,960; Referees: Daniel Hierrezuelo, Benjamín Jiménez, Carlos Cortés |

==== Semifinals ====
| 24 May 2012 1 | FC Barcelona Regal | 84–57 | Valencia Basket | Barcelona |
| 21:45 | Scoring by quarter: 23–10, 26–22, 19–12, 16–13 |
| | Pts: Lorbek 15; Rebs: Lorbek, Mickeal 6 Asts: Huertas, Lorbek 5 PIR: Lorbek 24 | Boxscore | Pts: Faverani 19; Rebs: Caner-Medley 8 Asts: Marković 4 PIR: Faverani 19 | Arena: Palau Blaugrana; Attendance: 4,485; Referees: Francisco De la Maza, Antonio Conde, Carlos Peruga |

| 27 May 2012 2 | FC Barcelona Regal | 76–81 | Valencia Basket | Barcelona |
| 12:00 | Scoring by quarter: 21–14, 16–25, 19–17, 20–25 |
| | Pts: Huertas 17; Rebs: N'Dong 7 Asts: Huertas 8 PIR: Huertas 25 | Boxscore | Pts: Martínez 18; Rebs: Caner-Medley 9 Asts: de Colo 5 PIR: Martínez 19 | Arena: Palau Blaugrana; Attendance: 3,929; Referees: Emilio Pérez Pizarro, Vicente Bultó, Carlos Cortés |

| 30 May 2012 3 | Valencia Basket | 64–80 | FC Barcelona Regal | Valencia |
| 20:45 | Scoring by quarter: 17–16, 13–24, 17–19, 17–21 |
| | Pts: Faverani 14; Rebs: Claver 6 Asts: Martínez 3 PIR: Martínez 12 | Boxscore | Pts: Navarro 15; Rebs: Sada 7 Asts: Sada 5 PIR: Huertas 17 | Arena: La Fonteta; Attendance: 9,000; Referees: Juan Luis Redondo, Juan Carlos García González, Benjamín Jiménez |

| 1 June 2012 4 | Valencia Basket | 73–77 | FC Barcelona Regal | Valencia |
| 20:45 | Scoring by quarter: 18–20, 11–13, 21–18, 23–26 |
| | Pts: de Colo 22; Rebs: three players 5 Asts: de Colo, Martínez 4 PIR: de Colo 29 | Boxscore | Pts: Navarro 17; Rebs: Wallace 9 Asts: Eidson 4 PIR: Wallace 20 | Arena: La Fonteta; Attendance: 8,400; Referees: Emilio Pérez Pizarro, José Ramón García Ortiz, Carlos Peruga |

==== Finals ====
| 6 June 2012 1 | FC Barcelona Regal | 81–80 | Real Madrid | Barcelona |
| 20:45 | Scoring by quarter: 15–20, 22–23, 17–23, 27–14 |
| | Pts: Navarro 21; Rebs: Vázquez 7 Asts: Huertas 3 PIR: Lorbek, Mickeal 23 | Boxscore | Pts: Carroll 18; Rebs: Tomić 7 Asts: Rodríguez 7 PIR: Carroll 18 | Arena: Palau Blaugrana; Attendance: 6,377; Referees: José Antonio Martín Bertrán, Juan Luis Redondo, Juan Carlos García González |

| 8 June 2012 2 | FC Barcelona Regal | 69–75 | Real Madrid | Barcelona |
| 22:00 | Scoring by quarter: 21–20, 19–20, 16–9, 13–26 |
| | Pts: Lorbek 22; Rebs: Vázquez 8 Asts: Lorbek 3 PIR: Vázquez 23 | Boxscore | Pts: Rodríguez 14; Rebs: Tomić 9 Asts: Llull 5 PIR: Tomić 18 | Arena: Palau Blaugrana; Attendance: 7,151; Referees: Daniel Hierrezuelo, Emilio Pérez Pizarro, Benjamín Jiménez |

| 11 June 2012 3 | Real Madrid | 85–59 | FC Barcelona Regal | Madrid |
| 22:00 | Scoring by quarter: 25–23, 21–9, 23–10, 16–17 |
| | Pts: Carroll 17; Rebs: Reyes 8 Asts: Rodríguez 9 PIR: Reyes 21 | Boxscore | Pts: Wallace 13; Rebs: Vázquez 4 Asts: Eidson 2 PIR: Sada 11 | Arena: WiZink Center; Attendance: 13,109; Referees: Juan Carlos Arteaga, Antonio Conde, José Ramón García Ortiz |

| 13 June 2012 4 | Real Madrid | 75–81 | FC Barcelona Regal | Madrid |
| 22:00 | Scoring by quarter: 15–17, 19–22, 21–23, 20–19 |
| | Pts: Mirotić 18; Rebs: Reyes, Tomić 6 Asts: Singler, Veličković 4 PIR: Tomić 18 | Boxscore | Pts: Lorbek 24; Rebs: Mickeal 8 Asts: Navarro 5 PIR: Mickeal 22 | Arena: WiZink Center; Attendance: 13,248; Referees: Daniel Hierrezuelo, Antonio Conde, Benjamín Jiménez |

| 16 June 2012 5 | FC Barcelona Regal | 73–69 | Real Madrid | Barcelona |
| 19:00 | Scoring by quarter: 16–12, 23–22, 17–13, 17–22 |
| | Pts: Mickeal 17; Rebs: Mickeal 9 Asts: Sada 4 PIR: Vázquez 24 | Boxscore | Pts: Carroll 16; Rebs: Tomić 11; Asts: three players 2 PIR: Carroll 12 | Arena: Palau Blaugrana; Attendance: 7,691; Referees: Juan Carlos Arteaga, Daniel Hierrezuelo, José Ramón García Ortiz |

=== EuroLeague ===
==== Results summary ====
| Overall | | | | | | Home | | | | | Away | | | | |
| Pld | W | L | PF | PA | PD | W | L | PF | PA | PD | W | L | PF | PA | PD |
|---|---|---|---|---|---|---|---|---|---|---|---|---|---|---|---|
| 16 | 15 | 1 | 1223 | 983 | +240 | 8 | 0 | 623 | 489 | +134 | 7 | 1 | 600 | 494 | +106 |

Source: Competitive matches

=== Regular season ===
==== Group D ====
| Pos | Team | Pld | W | L | PF | PA | PD | Qualification |
|---|---|---|---|---|---|---|---|---|
| 1 | (Spain) FC Barcelona Regal | 10 | 9 | 1 | 793 | 599 | +194 | Advance to Top 16 |
| 2 | (Italy) Montepaschi Siena | 10 | 8 | 2 | 779 | 696 | +83 | Advance to Top 16 |
| 3 | (Russia) UNICS | 10 | 7 | 3 | 702 | 656 | +46 | Advance to Top 16 |
| 4 | (Turkey) Galatasaray | 10 | 4 | 6 | 694 | 736 | −42 | Advance to Top 16 |
| 5 | (Poland) Asseco Prokom Gdynia | 10 | 1 | 9 | 618 | 743 | −125 | |
| 6 | (Slovenia) Union Olimpija | 10 | 1 | 9 | 589 | 745 | −156 | |

Source: Euroleague

==== Matches ====
| 20 October 2011 1 | Union Olimpija Ljubljana (Basketball Federation of Slovenia) | 64–86 | (Spanish Basketball Federation) FC Barcelona Regal | Ljubljana |
| 20:45 | Scoring by quarter: 19–24, 11–17, 21–20, 13–25 |
| | Pts: Green 17; Rebs: Markota 8 Asts: three players 2 PIR: Green 18 | Boxscore | Pts: Huertas 17; Rebs: Perović 9 Asts: Huertas 8 PIR: Huertas 27 | Arena: Arena Stožice; Attendance: 9,061; Referees: Fernando Rocha, Tolga Sahin, Rustu Nuran |

| 27 October 2011 2 | FC Barcelona Regal (Spanish Basketball Federation) | 88–61 | (Polish Basketball Federation) Asseco Prokom Gdynia | Barcelona |
| 18:30 | Scoring by quarter: 23–18, 24–18, 17–10, 24–15 |
| | Pts: Lorbek 20; Rebs: Eidson 7 Asts: Huertas, Navarro 5 PIR: Lorbek 26 | Boxscore | Pts: Lafayette 15; Rebs: Hrycaniuk, Łapeta 5 Asts: Blassingame 4 PIR: Lafayette 11 | Arena: Palau Blaugrana; Attendance: 3,724; Referees: Sreten Radovic, Roberto Chiari, Moritz Reiter |

| 3 November 2011 3 | UNICS Kazan (Russia) | 65–93 | (Spain) FC Barcelona Regal | Kazan |
| 17:00 | Scoring by quarter: 14–23, 18–21, 16–25, 17–24 |
| | Pts: Lyday 14; Rebs: three players 4 Asts: Greer 2 PIR: McCarty 13 | Boxscore | Pts: Lorbek 24; Rebs: Mickeal 6 Asts: Huertas 8 PIR: Lorbek 28 | Arena: Basket-Hall Kazan; Attendance: 7,226; Referees: Luigi Lamonica, Paolo Taurino, Sinisa Herceg |

| 10 November 2011 4 | FC Barcelona Regal (Spain) | 92–75 | (Italy) Montepaschi Siena | Barcelona |
| 20:45 | Scoring by quarter: 24–12, 16–16, 23–22, 29–25 |
| | Pts: Eidson 22; Rebs: N'Dong 7 Asts: Huertas 9 PIR: Eidson 34 | Boxscore | Pts: McCalebb 20; Rebs: Lavrinovič 8 Asts: Rakočević 5 PIR: McCalebb 20 | Arena: Palau Blaugrana; Attendance: 6,926; Referees: Grzegorz Ziemblicki, Eddie Viator, Milija Vojinovic |

| 17 November 2011 5 | Galatasaray Medical Park (Turkey) | 66–70 | (Spain) FC Barcelona Regal | Istanbul |
| 19:00 | Scoring by quarter: 19–19, 10–25, 19–17, 18–9 |
| | Pts: Andrić 17; Rebs: Shipp 6 Asts: Açık 4 PIR: Andrić 17 | Boxscore | Pts: Lorbek 14; Rebs: Mickeal 5 Asts: Huertas 4 PIR: Mickeal 15 | Arena: Abdi İpekçi Arena; Attendance: 11,300; Referees: Sasa Pukl, Robert Lottermoser, Boris Shulga |

| 24 November 2011 6 | FC Barcelona Regal (Spain) | 72–46 | (Slovenia) Union Olimpija Ljubljana | Barcelona |
| 20:45 | Scoring by quarter: 23–16, 17–10, 23–6, 9–14 |
| | Pts: Navarro 14; Rebs: Lorbek 7 Asts: Eidson 5 PIR: Huertas 18 | Boxscore | Pts: Ćapin, Green 17; Rebs: Green 5 Asts: Woodside 2 PIR: Green 9 | Arena: Palau Blaugrana; Attendance: 4,455; Referees: Recep Ankarali, Zdravko Rutesic, Sergio Silva |

| 1 December 2011 7 | Asseco Prokom Gdynia (Poland) | 45–76 | (Spain) FC Barcelona Regal | Gdynia |
| 20:45 | Scoring by quarter: 14–14, 12–22, 4–23, 15–17 |
| | Pts: Seweryn 10; Rebs: Hrycaniuk, Łapeta 5 Asts: Lafayette 3 PIR: Łapeta, Seweryn 7 | Boxscore | Pts: Sada 17; Rebs: Lorbek 8 Asts: Ingles 5 PIR: Lorbek 25 | Arena: Gdynia Arena; Attendance: 4,950; Referees: Fernando Rocha, Spiros Gkontas, Petri Mantyla |

| 8 December 2011 8 | FC Barcelona Regal (Spain) | 63–50 | (Russia) UNICS Kazan | Barcelona |
| 20:45 | Scoring by quarter: 21–15, 12–13, 14–15, 16–7 |
| | Pts: Navarro 13; Rebs: Eidson 7 Asts: Huertas 4 PIR: Navarro 14 | Boxscore | Pts: Lyday 12; Rebs: Domercant, Veremeenko 5 Asts: Veremeenko 3 PIR: Domercant 13 | Arena: Palau Blaugrana; Attendance: 4,676; Referees: Sasa Pukl, Milija Vojinovic, Elias Koromilas |

| 15 December 2011 9 | Montepaschi Siena (Italy) | 77–74 | (Spain) FC Barcelona Regal | Siena |
| 20:45 | Scoring by quarter: 23–20, 13–15, 11–24, 30–15 |
| | Pts: Rakočević 21; Rebs: Andersen 12; Asts: Andersen 3 PIR: Aradori 23 | Boxscore | Pts: Lorbek 22; Rebs: Mickeal 6 Asts: Huertas 4 PIR: Lorbek 29 | Arena: PalaEstra; Attendance: 4,852; Referees: Ilija Belošević, Robert Lottermoser, Eddie Viator |

| 21 December 2011 10 | FC Barcelona Regal (Spain) | 79–50 | (Turkey) Galatasaray Medical Park | Barcelona |
| 20:45 | Scoring by quarter: 23–16, 28–17, 17–11, 11–9 |
| | Pts: N'Dong 16; Rebs: Mickeal 7 Asts: Sada 4 PIR: N'Dong 29 | Boxscore | Pts: Özer 11; Rebs: Gordon, Shipp 4 Asts: Lakovič 3 PIR: Özer 9 | Arena: Palau Blaugrana; Attendance: 3,446; Referees: Carl Jungebrand, Spiros Gkontas, Tomasz Trawicki |

=== Top 16 ===
==== Group H ====
| Pos | Team | Pld | W | L | PF | PA | PD | Qualification |
|---|---|---|---|---|---|---|---|---|
| 1 | (Spain) FC Barcelona Regal | 6 | 6 | 0 | 430 | 384 | +46 | Advance to quarterfinals |
| 2 | (Israel) Maccabi Electra | 6 | 3 | 3 | 427 | 425 | +2 | Advance to quarterfinals |
| 3 | (Italy) Bennet Cantù | 6 | 3 | 3 | 420 | 426 | −6 | |
| 4 | (Lithuania) Žalgiris | 6 | 0 | 6 | 429 | 471 | −42 | |

Source: Euroleague

==== Matches ====
| 19 January 2012 1 | FC Barcelona Regal (Spanish Basketball Federation) | 65–60 | (Italian Basketball Federation) Bennet Cantù | Barcelona |
| 20:45 | Scoring by quarter: 15–18, 13–12, 21–19, 16–11 |
| | Pts: Eidson 15; Rebs: Lorbek 9 Asts: Eidson 5 PIR: Eidson 24 | Boxscore | Pts: Basile, Micov 13; Rebs: Micov 9 Asts: Micov 4 PIR: Micov 19 | Arena: Palau Blaugrana; Attendance: 4,829; Referees: Grzegorz Ziemblicki, Milija Vojinovic, Elias Koromilas |

| 26 January 2012 2 | Maccabi Electra Tel Aviv (Israel) | 57–71 | (Spanish Basketball Federation) FC Barcelona Regal | Tel Aviv |
| 20:45 | Scoring by quarter: 19–12, 10–17, 13–15, 15–27 |
| | Pts: Langford 17; Rebs: Hendrix 8 Asts: Mallet 2 PIR: Langford 17 | Boxscore | Pts: Lorbek 18; Rebs: Ingles 9 Asts: Eidson 4 PIR: Lorbek 24 | Arena: Nokia Arena; Attendance: 11,060; Referees: Christos Christodoulou, Milivoje Jovcic, Panagiotis Anastopoulos |

| 2 February 2012 3 | FC Barcelona Regal (Spain) | 94–80 | (Lithuania) Žalgiris Kaunas | Barcelona |
| 20:45 | Scoring by quarter: 23–18, 19–25, 21–16, 31–21 |
| | Pts: Lorbek 19; Rebs: Vázquez 6 Asts: Huertas 6 PIR: Lorbek 27 | Boxscore | Pts: Weems 17; Rebs: Kalnietis 9 Asts: Kalnietis 4 PIR: Kalnietis 15 | Arena: Palau Blaugrana; Attendance: 3,565; Referees: Guerrino Cerebuch, Tolga Sahin, Damir Javor |

| 9 February 2012 4 | Žalgiris Kaunas (Lithuania) | 58–67 | (Spain) FC Barcelona Regal | Kaunas |
| 18:45 | Scoring by quarter: 19–13, 13–17, 11–17, 15–20 |
| | Pts: Delininkaitis 17; Rebs: Javtokas 9 Asts: Kalnietis 5 PIR: Jankūnas 12 | Boxscore | Pts: Navarro 18; Rebs: Mickeal 6 Asts: Navarro 5 PIR: Navarro 23 | Arena: Žalgiris Arena; Attendance: 13,610; Referees: Carl Jungebrand, Borys Ryzhyk, Renaud Geller |

| 23 February 2012 5 | Bennet Cantù (Italy) | 62–63 | (Spain) FC Barcelona Regal | Desio |
| 20:45 | Scoring by quarter: 18–18, 15–17, 17–17, 12–11 |
| | Pts: Shermadini 14; Rebs: Shermadini 8 Asts: Basile, Perkins 5 PIR: Shermadini 19 | Boxscore | Pts: N'Dong 13; Rebs: Lorbek 6 Asts: Navarro 4 PIR: Navarro 17 | Arena: PalaDesio; Attendance: 6,289; Referees: Christos Christodoulou, Robert Lottermoser, Anastasios Piloidis |

| 29 February 2012 6 | FC Barcelona Regal (Spain) | 70–67 | (Israel) Maccabi Electra Tel Aviv | Barcelona |
| 20:45 | Scoring by quarter: 19–21, 15–12, 17–11, 19–23 |
| | Pts: Mickeal 20; Rebs: Perović, Wallace 8 Asts: four players 3 PIR: Mickeal 20 | Boxscore | Pts: Hendrix 24; Rebs: Hendrix 10; Asts: three players 2 PIR: Hendrix 28 | Arena: Palau Blaugrana; Attendance: 4,624; Referees: Recep Ankarali, Milivoje Jovcic, Tolga Sahin |

=== Quarterfinals ===
| 20 March 2012 1 | FC Barcelona Regal (Spanish Basketball Federation) | 78–66 | (Russian Basketball Federation) UNICS Kazan | Barcelona |
| 19:00 | Scoring by quarter: 22–14, 23–19, 17–20, 16–13 |
| | Pts: Mickeal 22; Rebs: Mickeal 7 Asts: Huertas 10; PIR: Mickeal 25 | Boxscore | Pts: Jawai 15; Rebs: Veremeenko 9 Asts: Samoylenko 7 PIR: Veremeenko 14 | Arena: Palau Blaugrana; Attendance: 5,863; Referees: Carl Jungebrand, Spiros Gkontas, Robert Vyklicky |

| 22 March 2012 2 | FC Barcelona Regal (Spanish Basketball Federation) | 66–63 | (Russian Basketball Federation) UNICS Kazan | Barcelona |
| 20:45 | Scoring by quarter: 17–13, 16–17, 18–18, 15–15 |
| | Pts: Navarro 18; Rebs: Huertas, Mickeal 4 Asts: Huertas 5 PIR: Mickeal 22 | Boxscore | Pts: Jawai 21; Rebs: Jawai 10; Asts: Domercant, Veremeenko 3 PIR: Jawai 26 | Arena: Palau Blaugrana; Attendance: 5,073; Referees: Luigi Lamonica, Borys Ryzhyk, Milija Vojinovic |

| 27 March 2012 3 | UNICS Kazan (Russia) | 56–67 | (Spain) FC Barcelona Regal | Kazan |
| 18:00 | Scoring by quarter: 19–17, 15–11, 11–18, 11–21 |
| | Pts: Domercant 19; Rebs: McCarty 8 Asts: Greer 3 PIR: Domercant 17 | Boxscore | Pts: Navarro 21; Rebs: Vázquez 6 Asts: Huertas 4 PIR: Navarro 19 | Arena: Basket-Hall Kazan; Attendance: 5,000; Referees: Christos Christodoulou, Milivoje Jovcic, Tolga Sahin |

=== Final Four ===
==== Semifinals ====
| 11 May 2012 | Olympiacos Piraeus (Greece) | 68–64 | (Spain) FC Barcelona Regal | Istanbul |
| 20:00 | Scoring by quarter: 17–11, 16–18, 17–18, 18–17 |
| | Pts: Spanoulis 21; Rebs: Mantzaris 6 Asts: Spanoulis 6 PIR: Spanoulis 15 | Boxscore | Pts: Navarro 18; Rebs: Vázquez 7 Asts: Navarro 3 PIR: N'Dong 14 | Arena: Sinan Erdem Dome; Attendance: 15,262; Referees: Luigi Lamonica, Robert Lottermoser, Tolga Sahin |

==== Third place game ====
| 13 May 2012 | Panathinaikos Athens (Greece) | 69–74 | (Spain) FC Barcelona Regal | Istanbul |
| 17:00 | Scoring by quarter: 20–21, 17–27, 15–10, 17–16 |
| | Pts: Diamantidis 17; Rebs: Marić 11; Asts: Calathes 2 PIR: Marić 22 | Boxscore | Pts: Huertas 21; Rebs: N'Dong, Vázquez 5 Asts: Huertas 3 PIR: Huertas 21 | Arena: Sinan Erdem Dome; Attendance: 15,262; Referees: Recep Ankarali, Robert Lottermoser, Oļegs Latiševs |

=== Copa del Rey ===
==== Quarterfinals ====
| 16 February 2012 | FC Barcelona Regal | 75–54 | Lucentum Alicante | Barcelona |
| 21:30 | Scoring by quarter: 17–13, 24–12, 21–10, 13–19 |
| | Pts: Lorbek 17; Rebs: Mickeal 10; Asts: Navarro 5 PIR: Navarro 20 | Boxscore | Pts: Llompart 14; Rebs: Llompart 7 Asts: Llompart 3 PIR: Llompart 18 | Arena: Palau Sant Jordi; Attendance: 14,500; Referees: Daniel Hierrezuelo, Juan Carlos García González, Carlos Cortés |

==== Semifinals ====
| 18 February 2012 | FC Barcelona Regal | 66–57 | Caja Laboral | Barcelona |
| 18:00 | Scoring by quarter: 19–18, 15–15, 14–19, 18–5 |
| | Pts: Lorbek 26; Rebs: N'Dong 8 Asts: Eidson 4 PIR: Lorbek 20 | Boxscore | Pts: Teletović 15; Rebs: Bjelica 8 Asts: Prigioni 4 PIR: San Emeterio 16 | Arena: Palau Sant Jordi; Attendance: 14,700; Referees: Daniel Hierrezuelo, Juan Luis Redondo, Antonio Conde |

==== Final ====
| 19 February 2012 | FC Barcelona Regal | 74–91 | Real Madrid | Barcelona |
| 18:00 | Scoring by quarter: 17–22, 16–20, 23–23, 18–26 |
| | Pts: N'Dong 19; Rebs: N'Dong 11; Asts: Navarro 5 PIR: N'Dong 24 | Boxscore | Pts: Llull 23; Rebs: Mirotić 5 Asts: Llull 5 PIR: Carroll 27 | Arena: Palau Sant Jordi; Attendance: 15,128; Referees: Daniel Hierrezuelo, Emilio Pérez Pizarro, Juan Carlos García González |

=== Supercopa de España ===
==== Semifinals ====
| 30 September 2011 | FC Barcelona Regal | 74–70 | Real Madrid | Bilbao |
| 21:30 | Scoring by quarter: 21–13, 14–20, 17–25, 22–12 |
| | Pts: Lorbek 15; Rebs: Lorbek 9 Asts: Navarro 2 PIR: Lorbek 23 | Boxscore | Pts: Carroll, Pocius 14; Rebs: Reyes 10; Asts: Llull 4 PIR: Begić 12 | Arena: Bilbao Arena; Attendance: 8,230; Referees: Daniel Hierrezuelo, Juan Carlos García González, Vicente Bultó |

==== Final ====
| 1 October 2011 | Caja Laboral | 73–82 | FC Barcelona Regal | Bilbao |
| 18:00 | Scoring by quarter: 20–25, 22–13, 17–20, 14–24 |
| | Pts: Teletović 15; Rebs: San Emeterio 8 Asts: Heurtel 4 PIR: Prigioni 14 | Boxscore | Pts: Navarro 24; Rebs: N'Dong 10; Asts: Huertas, Navarro 3 PIR: Navarro 27 | Arena: Bilbao Arena; Attendance: 7,800; Referees: Emilio Pérez Pizarro, Antonio Conde, Benjamín Jiménez |

== Individual awards ==
=== Liga ACB ===
Player of the Round

- (Senegal) Boniface N'Dong – Round 2, Round 30
- (Spain) Juan Carlos Navarro – Round 4, Round 31
- (Slovenia) Erazem Lorbek – Round 26

Player of the Month

- (Senegal) Boniface N'Dong – April

All-Liga ACB Team

- (Slovenia) Erazem Lorbek

=== Supercopa ===
Final MVP

- (Spain) Juan Carlos Navarro

=== EuroLeague ===
All-EuroLeague First Team

- (Slovenia) Erazem Lorbek

All-EuroLeague Second Team

- (Spain) Juan Carlos Navarro

MVP of the Round

- (Slovenia) Erazem Lorbek – Round 7 (Regular season)
