= 2013 Copa del Rey de Baloncesto =

Copa del Rey 2013
- League: Copa del Rey
- Sport: Basketball
- Duration: 7–10 February 2013
- Games: 7
- Teams: 8
- Total attendance: 14,315 per game
- TV partner(s): La 1, FORTA
- Season MVP: (United States) Pete Mickeal

Final
- Champions: FC Barcelona Regal
- Runners-up: Valencia Basket Club

Copa del Rey seasons
- ← 2011–12 2013–14 →

The Copa del Rey de Baloncesto 2012–13 was the 77th edition of the Spanish King's Basketball Cup. It is managed by the ACB League and was held in Vitoria-Gasteiz, in the Fernando Buesa Arena on February 7–10, 2013. FC Barcelona Regal was the champion.

== Qualified teams ==
The seven first qualified after the first half of the ACB Regular Season will qualify to the tournament. As Caja Laboral, host team, finished between the seven first teams, the eight qualified will join the Copa del Rey.

#	Teams	P	W	L	PF	PA
1	Real Madrid	17	16	1	1512	1302
2	Caja Laboral	17	14	3	1405	1286
3	Valencia Basket Club	17	12	5	1401	1301
4	Herbalife Gran Canaria	17	12	5	1275	1208
5	Uxue Bilbao Basket	17	11	6	1384	1302
6	CAI Zaragoza	17	10	7	1310	1230
7	FC Barcelona Regal	17	9	8	1323	1201
8	Asefa Estudiantes	17	9	8	1384	1312

== Draw ==
The draw will be held in Vitoria-Gasteiz on January 14, 2013. The first four qualified teams are in the Pot 1 and will face each one with the other four qualified teams. There are no restrictions for the draw of the semifinals.

As new, the first qualified team played its game on Thursday.

== Bracket ==
Quarterfinals; February 7 & 8		Semifinals; February 9		Final; February 10
Real Madrid	108
FC Barcelona Regal	111	FC Barcelona Regal	80
Caja Laboral	88	Caja Laboral	69
CAI Zaragoza	64			FC Barcelona Regal	85
Valencia Basket Club	77			Valencia Basket Club	69
Asefa Estudiantes	59	Valencia Basket Club	83
Herbalife GC	74	Herbalife GC	72
Uxue Bilbao Basket	62

=== Quarterfinals ===
La 1

February 7
19:00 GTM+1

Report
Stats

Real Madrid	108–111 (OT)	FC Barcelona Regal
Scoring by quarter: 18–25, 28–24, 14–15, 17–13, Overtime: 16–16, 15–18
Pts: Llull 23; Rebs: R. Fernández 7 Asts: Rodríguez 8 PIR: Rodríguez 23		Pts: Mickeal 26; Rebs: Tomić 11; Asts: Huertas 10; PIR: Tomić 33

Fernando Buesa Arena, Vitoria-Gasteiz
Attendance: 14,500
Referees: Hierrezuelo, Bultó, Jiménez

FORTA

February 7
21:30 GTM+1

Report
Stats

Caja Laboral	88–64	CAI Zaragoza
Scoring by quarter: 23–24, 17–17, 29–13, 19–10
Pts: Lampe 17; Rebs: Nocioni 7 Asts: Heurtel, San Emeterio 4 PIR: Causeur 22		Pts: Aguilar 23; Rebs: Norel 6 Asts: Llompart, Roll 2 PIR: Aguilar 28

Fernando Buesa Arena, Vitoria-Gasteiz
Attendance: 14,500
Referees: Arteaga, Pérez Pérez, Perea

La 1

February 8
19:00 GTM+1

Report
Stats

Valencia Basket Club	77–59	Asefa Estudiantes
Scoring by quarter: 15–13, 22–12, 19–16, 21–18
Pts: Faverani 23; Rebs: Faverani, Marković 11; Asts: Marković 5 PIR: Faverani 32		Pts: Granger 16; Rebs: Gabriel 5 Asts: J. Fernández 5 PIR: J. Fernández 14

Fernando Buesa Arena, Vitoria-Gasteiz
Attendance: 14,200
Referees: Martín Bertrán, García González, Araña

FORTA

February 8
21:30 GTM+1

Report
Stats

Herbalife Gran Canaria	74–62	Uxue Bilbao Basket
Scoring by quarter: 21–19, 17–15, 17–15, 19–13
Pts: Rey 22; Rebs: Rey 8 Asts: Nelson, Toolson 5 PIR: Rey 27		Pts: Mumbrú 15; Rebs: Hamilton 6 Asts: three players 3 PIR: Mumbrú 16

Fernando Buesa Arena, Vitoria-Gasteiz
Attendance: 13,600
Referees: Pérez Pizarro, Conde, Cortés

=== Semifinals ===
La 1

February 9
19:00 GTM+1

Report
Stats

Caja Laboral	69–80	FC Barcelona Regal
Scoring by quarter: 19–18, 20–17, 18–20, 12–25
Pts: Lampe 15; Rebs: Lampe, Nocioni 5 Asts: Heurtel 4 PIR: Nocioni 17		Pts: Navarro 20; Rebs: Tomić 10; Asts: Huertas 9 PIR: Navarro 18

Fernando Buesa Arena, Vitoria-Gasteiz
Attendance: 15,085
Referees: Arteaga, Pérez Pizarro, Jiménez

FORTA

February 9
21:30 GTM+1

Report
Stats

Valencia Basket Club	83–72	Herbalife Gran Canaria
Scoring by quarter: 17–10, 22–12, 25–22, 19–24
Pts: Doellman 21; Rebs: Doellman, Faverani 5 Asts: San Miguel 6 PIR: Doellman 23		Pts: Toolson 17; Rebs: Nelson, Newley 6 Asts: Nelson 6 PIR: Nelson 21

Fernando Buesa Arena, Vitoria-Gasteiz
Attendance: 14,200
Referees: Martín Bertrán, Conde, Cortés

=== Final ===
La 1

February 10
19:00 GTM+1

Report
Stats

FC Barcelona Regal	85–69	Valencia Basket Club
Scoring by quarter: 17–18, 19–15, 25–20, 24–16
Pts: Mickeal 14; Rebs: Lorbek 7 Asts: Huertas 8 PIR: Huertas 19		Pts: Doellman, Marković 14; Rebs: Doellman, Faverani 6 Asts: Ribas, San Miguel 3 PIR: Faverani 19

Fernando Buesa Arena, Vitoria-Gasteiz
Attendance: 14,120
Referees: Arteaga, Conde, Jiménez

Copa del Rey 2013 Champions
FC Barcelona Regal
23rd title
