= Michael Roll (basketball) =

American-Tunisian basketball player

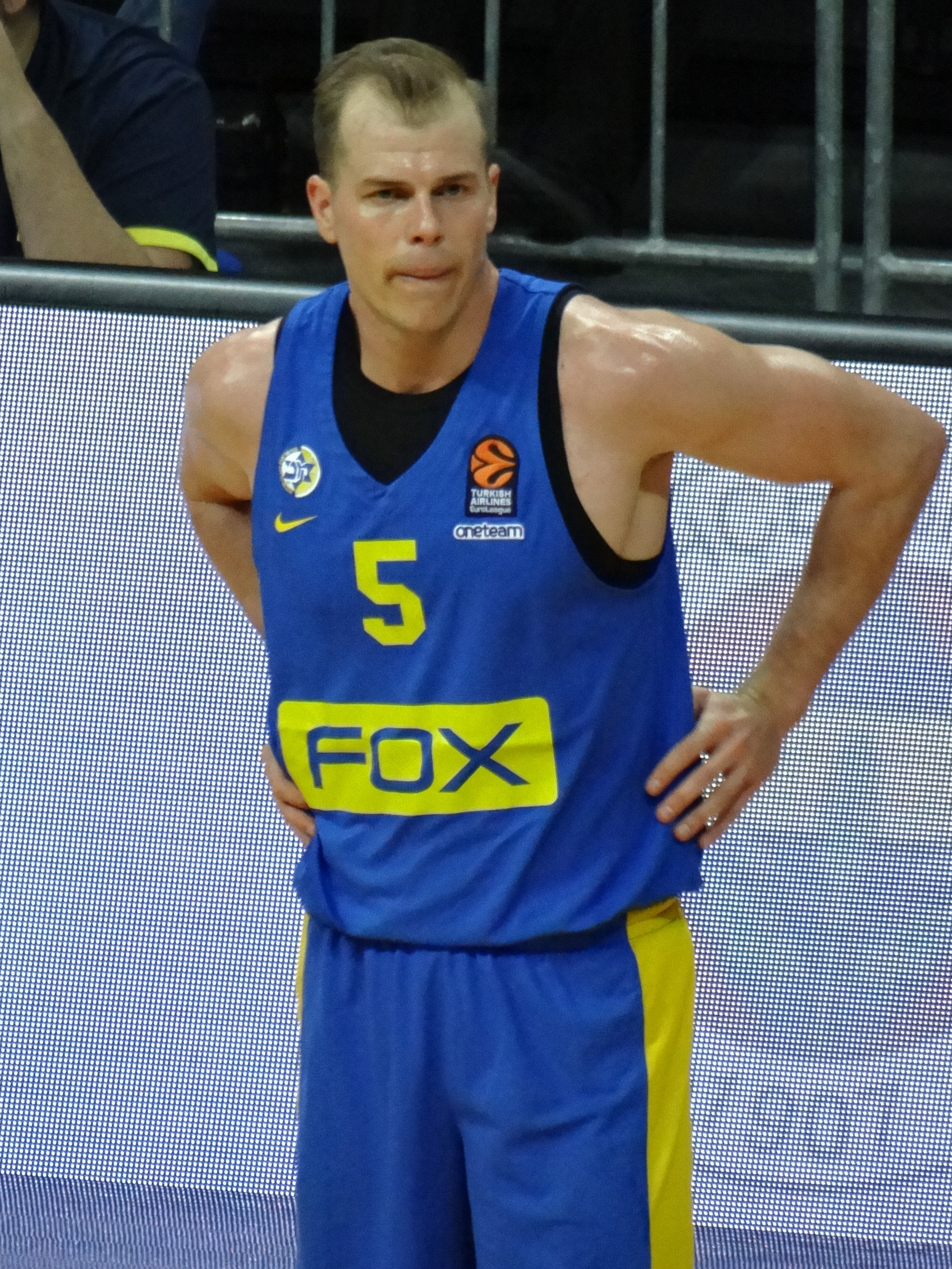
- Roll with Maccabi Tel Aviv in March 2018

Personal information
- Born: April 12, 1987 (age 39) Mission Viejo, California
- Listed height: 1.98 m (6 ft 6 in)
- Listed weight: 92 kg (203 lb)

Career information
- High school: Aliso Niguel (Aliso Viejo, California)
- College: UCLA (2005–2010)
- NBA draft: 2010: undrafted
- Playing career: 2010–2023
- Position: Shooting guard / small forward

Career history
- 2010–2011: Bornova Belediye
- 2011–2012: Antwerp Giants
- 2012–2014: CAI Zaragoza
- 2014–2015: Türk Telekom
- 2015–2016: Tüyap Büyükçekmece
- 2016: Saski Baskonia
- 2016–2017: Beşiktaş
- 2017–2019: Maccabi Tel Aviv
- 2019–2021: Olimpia Milano
- 2021–2022: Pınar Karşıyaka
- 2023: Paris Basketball
- 2023: US Monastir

Career highlights
- Italian Cup winner (2021); Italian Super Cup winner (2020); 2× Israeli League champion (2018, 2019); Israeli League Cup winner (2017); Turkish League All-Star (2016); First-team All-Pac-10 (2010)
Medals
Men's basketball
Representing Tunisia
AfroBasket
Gold medal – first place	2021 Rwanda
Bronze medal – third place	2015 Tunisia

Michael Brandon Roll (born April 12, 1987) is an American-born naturalized Tunisian former professional basketball player. He represented the senior Tunisian national team internationally after becoming a naturalized citizen in 2015.

Roll played college basketball for the UCLA Bruins, who reached the Final Four three times in four NCAA tournament appearances during his tenure. Roll was the Bruins leading scorer in his final season in 2009–10, when he earned all-conference honors in the Pacific-10. He has played professionally in Turkey, Belgium, Spain, Israel, Italy, and France.

== Early life ==
Roll was born in Mission Viejo, California, to Richard and Joyce Roll. He played basketball at Aliso Niguel High School, where as a senior he was named the California Interscholastic Federation (CIF) Southern Section Division I-A Player of the Year. That season, he averaged almost 25 points per game while leading the Wolverines over top-seeded Lake Forest El Toro in the Division I-A title game.

Ranked as the No. 1 shooting guard in the West by Scout.com, Roll originally gave a verbal, non-binding, commitment to attend college at the University of California, Santa Barbara, before he changed to the University of California, Los Angeles (UCLA).

== College career ==
As a freshman for UCLA in 2005–06, Roll played on a 32–7 Bruins team that lost in the 2006 national championship to Florida. Though he played behind Arron Afflalo and Cedric Bozeman that season, Roll averaged 15 minutes per game, and UCLA coach Ben Howland called him "an important contributor." The following season, he played behind Afflalo and Josh Shipp while UCLA returned to the Final Four. As a junior, he was bypassed for a starting position by sophomore Russell Westbrook. UCLA again reached the Final Four, but Roll's season had ended prematurely after he ruptured his left plantar fascia. However, he was granted a medical redshirt, earning another year of eligibility to effectively remain a junior. He returned the following season, but continued as a role player behind Shipp and freshman Jrue Holiday. Roll and the Bruins again qualified for the NCAA Tournament, but were eliminated in the round of 32.

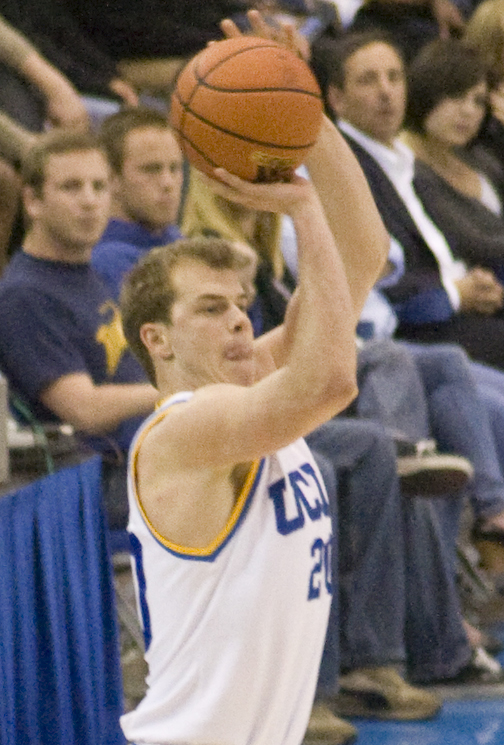
Roll with UCLA in 2009

After years of being a role player for the Bruins, Roll became a leader of the team as a fifth-year senior in 2009–10. He was pushed into his new role after the departure of seniors Shipp, Darren Collison, and Alfred Aboya from the prior season. Moreover, he would have been only the fourth option on the team behind Kevin Love, Westbrook, and Holiday, had they not declared early for the National Basketball Association. Roll prepared for the increased workload during the offseason with a workout regimen that included basketball workouts twice a day, ball-handling drills, shooting 500 times daily, and a weight-training program to strengthen his legs and back. UCLA's roster that season included six freshmen and six sophomores. Roll, Nikola Dragović, and James Keefe were the only seniors on the team, and Keefe's season ended prematurely after season-ending shoulder surgery. UCLA's season ended in the semifinals of the 2010 Pacific-10 Conference tournament with an 85–72 loss to California, despite a career-high 27 points from Roll. He averaged 22.5 points in the two tournament games, and was named to the All-Tournament team. The Bruins finished the season 14-18 and did not qualify for the NCAA tournament for the first time in six seasons. Roll earned first team All-Pac-10 honors, and was named the Bruins' most valuable player after leading the team in scoring with 14.1 points per game. He also led UCLA with 3.6 assists per game, and set the school record for most career games played (147), surpassing Collison and Aboya's previous mark (142). Roll was selected to play in the Reese's College All-Star Game during the Final Four.

== Professional career ==
=== Bornova Belediye (2010–2011) ===
After going undrafted in the 2010 NBA draft, Roll joined the Toronto Raptors for the 2010 NBA Summer League. One week later, on July 3, 2010, Roll started his professional career with the Turkish team Bornova Belediye, signing a one-year deal.

=== Antwerp Giants (2011–2012) ===
On July 24, 2011, Roll signed with the Belgian team Antwerp Giants for the 2011–12 season. On November 8, 2011, Roll recorded a career-high 27 points, shooting 13-of-17 from the field, along with four rebounds and three assists in a 72–76 loss to BC Enisey. Roll helped Antwerp to reach the 2012 Belgian Cup Final, where they eventually lost to Okapi Aalstar.

=== Zaragoza (2012–2014) ===
On July 5, 2012, Roll joined the Spanish team Zaragoza for the 2012–13 season. In his first season with Zaragoza, Roll helped them to reach the 2013 ACB Playoffs Semifinals as well as the Copa del Rey Quarterfinals. On June 30, 2013, Roll signed a one-year contract extension with Zaragoza.

=== Türk Telekom (2014–2015) ===
On July 28, 2014, Roll signed with Türk Telekom of the Turkish Basketball Super League for 2014–15 season.

=== Büyükçekmece (2015–2016) ===
On July 13, 2015, Roll signed a one-year deal with Tüyap Büyükçekmece B.K. On January 24, 2016, Roll participated in the 2016 Turkish Super League All-Star Game. In 30 games played during the 2016–17 season, Roll averaged 16.3 points, 4.6 rebounds and 4.6 assists per game.

=== Baskonia (2016) ===
On May 24, 2016, Roll signed with the Spanish team Baskonia for the 2016 ACB Playoffs as well as the following season, but parted ways with the team at the end of the playoffs.

=== Beşiktaş (2016–2017) ===
On July 19, 2016, Roll returned to Turkey for a third stint, signing with Beşiktaş for the 2016–17 season. Roll helped Beşiktaş to reach the 2017 Turkish League Finals, where they eventually lost to Fenerbahçe.

=== Maccabi Tel Aviv (2017–2019) ===
On July 3, 2017, Roll joined the Israeli team Maccabi Tel Aviv of the EuroLeague, signing a one-year deal with an option for another one. On January 11, 2018, Roll recorded a season-high 23 points, shooting 8-of-13 from the field, along with two rebounds and two assists in a 90–88 win over Brose Bamberg. Roll won the 2017 Israeli League Cup and the 2018 Israeli League Championship titles with Maccabi.

On June 27, 2018, Roll signed a one-year contract extension with Maccabi. On January 3, 2019, Roll recorded a season-high 23 points, shooting 6-of-7 from three-point range, along with four rebounds, five assists and three steals in a 91–79 loss to Real Madrid. Roll went on to win the 2019 Israeli League Championship with Maccabi, winning his second straight Israeli League title in the process.

=== Olimpia Milano (2019–2021) ===
On July 25, 2019, Roll signed a two-year deal with Olimpia Milano of the Italian Lega Basket Serie A and the EuroLeague. On June 23, 2021, Roll officially parted ways with the Italian club.

=== Pınar Karşıyaka (2021–2022) ===
On October 1, 2021, Roll signed with Pınar Karşıyaka of the Turkish Basketball Super League.

=== Paris Basketball (2023) ===
In January 2023, Roll was announced by the Tunisian champions US Monastir, nevertheless, he signed with Paris Basketball in France on 26 January 2023. At Paris, Roll replaced the injured Kyle Allman and appeared in two league games for the Paris side, averaging 7 points per outing. He left the team on February 7, 2023.

=== US Monastir (2023) ===
Shortly after leaving Paris, he finally joined US Monastir. Roll played at the 2023 FIBA Intercontinental Cup, before leaving the team shortly after.

== National team career ==
Roll became a naturalized citizen of Tunisia in July 2015, enabling him to join the Tunisia national basketball team and compete in AfroBasket 2015, which was hosted in Tunisia. On July 3, 2017 following Roll's signing with Israeli basketball club Maccabi Tel Aviv, Ali Benzarti, president of the Tunisian Basketball Federation (FTBB), announced that Roll would not be on the Tunisian national team "for now" because of his recent integration with a team in the Israeli League. Relations between Tunisia and Israel have been stressed since the Second Intifada of 2000. After leaving Maccabi in July 2019, Roll once again joined Tunisia national team, becoming a member of the squad representing Tunisia at the 2019 FIBA Basketball World Cup.

== Career statistics ==
Legend
GP	Games played	GS	Games started	MPG	Minutes per game
FG%	Field-goal percentage	3P%	3-point field-goal percentage	FT%	Free-throw percentage
RPG	Rebounds per game	APG	Assists per game	SPG	Steals per game
BPG	Blocks per game	PPG	Points per game	PIR	Performance index rating
**Bold**	Career high

=== EuroLeague ===
*	Led the league

Year	Team	GP	GS	MPG	FG%	3P%	FT%	RPG	APG	SPG	BPG	PPG	PIR
2017–18	Maccabi	29	**28**	**26.2**	.470	.408	.889	2.1	**2.9**	.3	**.1**	**9.1**	**9.3**
2018–19	Maccabi	29	7	21.5	**.473**	.407	**.905**	2.2	2.7	**.7**	.0	**9.1**	8.7
2019–20	Milano	28*	19	21.9	.457	**.438**	.867	**2.5**	1.6	.5	.0	7.5	6.9
2020–21	Milano	**36**	10	14.3	.449	.435	.889	1.3	1.2	.4	**.1**	4.2	3.6
Career		122	64	20.6	.464	.422	.889	2.0	2.1	.5	.0	7.3	6.9

=== College ===
Year	Team	GP	GS	MPG	FG%	3P%	FT%	RPG	APG	SPG	BPG	PPG
2005–06	UCLA	38	5	14.7	.369	.383	.714	.9	.9	.3	.1	3.4
2006–07	UCLA	36	1	16.3	.393	.358	.750	1.4	1.1	.3	.1	4.8
2007–08	UCLA	6	0	15.5	.240	.286	.333	1.7	2.3	.3	.0	2.8
2008–09	UCLA	35	2	17.1	.491	.515	.684	1.3	1.4	.5	.3	6.7
2009–10	UCLA	32	32	35.8	.468	.426	.766	2.8	3.6	1.0	.1	14.1
Career		147	40	20.3	.437	.417	.726	1.6	1.7	.5	.1	6.8
