= Lamont Hamilton =

American basketball player (born 1984)

Lamont Hamilton ラモント・ハミルトン
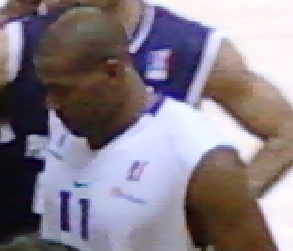
- Hamilton in 2011

Personal information
- Born: April 6, 1984 (age 42) Gowanus Brooklyn, New York, U.S.
- Listed height: 6 ft 10 in (2.08 m)
- Listed weight: 255 lb (116 kg)

Career information
- High school: Bishop Ford (Brooklyn, New York); Milford Academy (New Berlin, New York); Bridgton Academy (Bridgton, Maine)
- College: St. John's (2003–2007)
- NBA draft: 2007: undrafted
- Playing career: 2007–2020
- Position: Power forward / center

Career history
- 2007–2008: Basquet Inca
- 2008–2009: Tenerife
- 2009–2012: Paris-Levallois
- 2012–2013: Bilbao Basket
- 2013–2014: Laboral Kutxa
- 2015: Krasny Oktyabr
- 2015–2016: Beşiktaş
- 2016–2017: Ryukyu Golden Kings
- 2018–2020: Niigata Albirex BB

Career highlights
- All-EuroCup Second Team (2013)

Lamont Alexander "Monty" Hamilton (born April 6, 1984) is an American professional basketball player for Niigata Albirex BB of the Japanese B.League. He is a 6-foot-10-inch (2.08 m) tall power forward-center.

== College career ==
Hamilton played four years of college basketball at St. John's University, where he played with the St. John's Red Storm, from 2003 to 2007. He was named to the All-Big East Conference First Team in 2007.

== Professional career ==
Hamilton began his pro career in 2007 with Basquet Inca of the Spanish 2nd Division. In 2008, he moved to the Spanish 2nd Division club Tenerife. In 2009, he joined the French League club Paris-Levallois.

In July 2012, he signed a one-year deal with the Spanish club Bilbao Basket. With Bilbao, he was named to the European 2nd-tier competition EuroCup's All-EuroCup Second Team in 2013.

In June 2013, he signed a two-year deal with the Spanish club Laboral Kutxa. He left the Basque team in December 2014, after playing 47 games and missing 39 due to injuries. On December 31, 2014, he signed with Krasny Oktyabr of Russia for the rest of the season.

On July 22, 2015, he signed a one-year deal with Beşiktaş.

On August 20, 2016, he signed with Ryukyu Golden Kings of the Japanese B.League.

== EuroLeague career statistics ==
Legend
GP	Games played	GS	Games started	MPG	Minutes per game
FG%	Field-goal percentage	3P%	3-point field-goal percentage	FT%	Free-throw percentage
RPG	Rebounds per game	APG	Assists per game	SPG	Steals per game
BPG	Blocks per game	PPG	Points per game	PIR	Performance index rating
**Bold**	Career high

Year	Team	GP	GS	MPG	FG%	3P%	FT%	RPG	APG	SPG	BPG	PPG	PIR
2013–14	Baskonia	**12**	**1**	**26.3**	**.412**	**.452**	**.658**	**3.6**	**1.3**	**1.1**	.9	10.3	**10.3**
2014–15	Baskonia	4	0	15.4	.318	.125	.500	1.8	1.0	0.0	**1.0**	4.0	1.8
Career		16	1	17.9	.395	.384	.650	3.1	1.3	.8	.9	8.7	8.2

== Japanese league career statistics ==
Year	Team	GP	GS	MPG	FG%	3P%	FT%	RPG	APG	SPG	BPG	PPG
2016–17	Ryukyu Kings	60	39	23.0	.428	.289	.727	6.8	3.0	.7	1.0	11.7
2017–18	Niigata	30	16	22.8	.454	.336	.620	5.7	1.2	.5	1.0	13.3

== Awards and achievements ==
=== College ===
- All-Big East Conference First Team: (2007)

=== Pro career ===
- French League All-Star: (2012)
- All-EuroCup Second Team: (2013)
