= Germán Gabriel =

Spanish basketball player

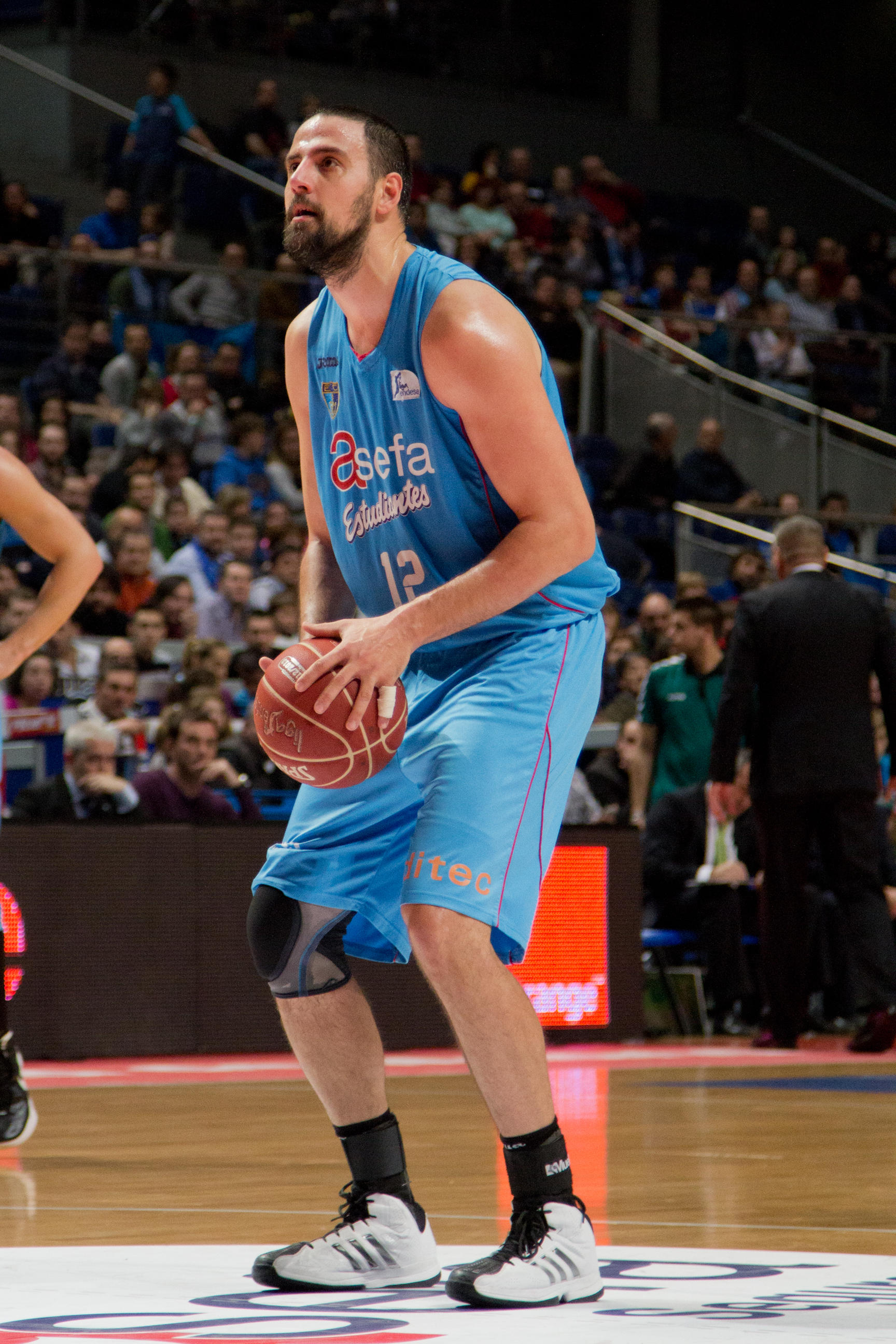
- Gabriel setting to shoot a free-throw while playing with Estudiantes.

Personal information
- Born: November 18, 1980 (age 45) Caracas, Venezuela
- Listed height: 6 ft 9.5 in (2.07 m)
- Listed weight: 245 lb (111 kg)

Career information
- NBA draft: 2002: undrafted
- Playing career: 1998–2016
- Position: Power forward / center
- Coaching career: 2016–present

Career history

Playing
- 1998–1999: Unicaja B
- 1999–2004: Unicaja
- 2001: →Club Ourense Baloncesto
- 2001–2003: →CB Estudiantes
- 2004–2005: Bilbao Basket
- 2005–2007: CB Girona
- 2007–2009: Unicaja
- 2009–2013: CB Estudiantes
- 2013–2014: Bilbao Basket
- 2014: Marinos de Anzoátegui
- 2014–2015: Bilbao Basket
- 2015: Unicaja
- 2015–2016: Marinos de Anzoátegui

Coaching
- 2016–2017: Iowa Energy (assistant)

Germán Antonio Gabriel Benaches (born November 16, 1980) is a Spanish retired professional basketball player. He played as a power forward and as a center.

== Professional career ==
Gabriel signed with the Liga ACB club Estudiantes in 2009. After spending four years in the club of Madrid, he signed for Bilbao Basket.

He came back to Unicaja, his first club, in 2015 once he left Bilbao. On December 2, he left Unicaja.

On 4 November 2016, Gabriel announced his retirement from professional basketball.

== National team career ==
After playing with the junior national teams of Spain, Gabriel joined the senior Spain men's national basketball team. He was selected to play with Spain at the EuroBasket 2013.

== Career statistics ==
Legend
GP	Games played	GS	Games started	MPG	Minutes per game
FG%	Field-goal percentage	3P%	3-point field-goal percentage	FT%	Free-throw percentage
RPG	Rebounds per game	APG	Assists per game	SPG	Steals per game
BPG	Blocks per game	PPG	Points per game	PIR	Performance index rating
**Bold**	Career high

=== EuroLeague ===
Year	Team	GP	GS	MPG	FG%	3P%	FT%	RPG	APG	SPG	BPG	PPG	PIR
2003–04	Unicaja	14	1	10.1	.514	**.556**	.700	2.6	.4	.4	**.1**	3.9	4.1
2007–08	Unicaja	**18**	**3**	**16.6**	**.556**	.491	.692	**2.8**	**.8**	**.7**	**.1**	**8.1**	**8.4**
2008–09	Unicaja	6	0	9.3	.500	.467	**1.000**	1.5	.2	**.7**	.0	5.7	6.0
2014–15	Unicaja	7	0	9.0	.438	.375	.714	2.0	.6	.1	**.1**	3.1	3.4
Career		45	4	12.4	.527	.483	.704	2.5	.6	.5	.1	5.7	5.9
