= Spencer Nelson =

Professional basketball player

Personal information
- Born: July 11, 1980 (age 46) Pocatello, Idaho, U.S.
- Listed height: 6 ft 8 in (2.03 m)
- Listed weight: 225 lb (102 kg)

Career information
- High school: Pocatello (Pocatello, Idaho)
- College: Utah State (1998–1999, 2002–2005)
- NBA draft: 2005: undrafted
- Playing career: 2005–2015
- Position: Small forward / power forward
- Coaching career: 2016–present

Career history

Playing
- 2005–2006: GHP Bamberg
- 2006–2007: Benetton Treviso
- 2007–2008: Fortitudo Bologna
- 2008–2009: Aris Thessaloniki
- 2009–2010: Peristeri
- 2010–2013: Gran Canaria
- 2013–2014: Montepaschi Siena
- 2014–2015: Reyer Venezia Mestre

Coaching
- 2016–2018: Utah State (assistant)

Career highlights
- As player: Italian Cup MVP (2007); Italian Cup winner (2007); 2× Italian Supercup winner (2006, 2013)

Spencer Howells Nelson (Azerbaijani: Spenser Hauels Nelson, born July 11, 1980) is an American-born Azerbaijani naturalized former professional basketball player. At 6'8", he played at both small forward and power forward, although he was mainly considered a power forward.

== High school ==
Spencer attended Pocatello High School and was named the Idaho A-1 Player of the Year as a senior in 1998. As a senior, he averaged 22 points, 11 rebounds, five assists, and two blocks per game. Hit 43.3 percent of his three-pointers and sank 73.0 percent of his free throws as a senior. As a junior, he averaged 14.1 points, 10.3 rebounds, and shot 62.5 percent from the field. Earned second-team all-state honors and first-team all-region honors as a junior. Spencer had a notoriously loud and raucous group of fans in high school, whom he named "The Sixth Man," which provided a home-court advantage even on away games. Spencer's abilities weren't limited to the basketball court; he was a four-year letterwinner in tennis, winning the men's doubles state championship in 1998 and finishing third in mixed doubles in 1997.

== College ==
After his freshman year, he served a two-year mission in Oklahoma for the Church of Jesus Christ of Latter-day Saints. Upon his return, he became one of the Big West Conference's best players.

Nelson had a stellar career as an Aggie and was named to the Utah State University All-Century Team while still playing for Utah State.

== Professional basketball ==
After graduating in 2005, he was not drafted in the 2005 NBA draft. However, the Utah Jazz invited him to try out. He was an immediate fan favorite because of his success at Utah State. Despite playing well, Nelson was not chosen for the final roster, but was immediately offered a spot playing for GHP Bamberg in Germany. In 2006, instead of seeing if he'd make the final roster for the Jazz, Nelson chose to play for Benetton Treviso, a team that he made an outstanding performance against while playing with Bamberg in the Euroleague (he scored 23 points, pulled down 20 rebounds and delivered 7 assists) in a 92-85 home win. Nelson's good performance helped the team qualify for the top 16 phase, the first ever German team to accomplish this achievement.
After spending one season with Treviso, mainly coming from the bench, Nelson transferred to Climamio Bologna, also in Italy. On 26 January 2010 he stated that GHP Bamberg (Germany) was his favourite professional club he played for. He also told a local radio station to send greetings to the fans of his former club.

In July 2010 he signed a contract with CB Gran Canaria in the Spanish ACB, where he played with former Utah State teammate Jaycee Carroll during the season 2010/11.

In September 2013, he signed with the Italian club Montepaschi Siena for the 2013–14 season.

On November 13, 2014, he signed with Reyer Venezia Mestre for the 2014–15 season.

On July 14, 2015, Nelson announced his retirement from professional basketball.

Nelson returned to Utah State as an assistant coach on August 23, 2016.

== Personal life ==
After he retired from playing basketball, Nelson worked at Cicero Group in Salt Lake City, Utah, where he ran the company's private equity group. Nelson is married to Julie Clayton Nelson.

== Awards ==
=== High school ===
- 1997-98 Idaho A-1 Player of the Year

=== College ===
- 2002-03 Big West Player of the Week (1/13/03)
- 2002-03 Utah State Most Inspirational Player
- 2002-03 Academic All-Big West
- 2002-03 Big West Hustle Player of the Year
- 2002-03 All-Big West Honorable Mention
- 2003-04 Big West Player of the Week (1/12/04)
- 2003-04 Utah State Most Inspirational Player
- 2003-04 Multiple Sclerosis Society Utah State Chapter Collegiate Male Athlete of the Year
- 2003-04 Academic All-Big West
- 2003-04 Big West Hustle Player of the Year
- 2003-04 Big West Second Team All-Conference
- 2004-05 Big West Player of the Week (12/20/04)
- 2004-05 Big West Player of the Week (1/31/05)
- 2004-05 Big West Player of the Week (2/7/05)
- 2004-05 Utah State Most Inspirational Player
- 2004-05 Cecil Baker Most Valuable Player
- 2004-05 Utah State Male Athlete of the Year
- 2004-05 Utah State Big West Scholar-Athlete
- 2004-05 Big West All-Tournament Team
- 2004-05 Big West First Team All-Conference
- 2004-05 Big West Hustle Player of the Year
- 2004-05 United States Basketball Writer's Association All District 8 Team
- 2004-05 CollegeInsider.com Mid Major Player of the Year
