= Vítor Faverani =

Brazilian basketball player

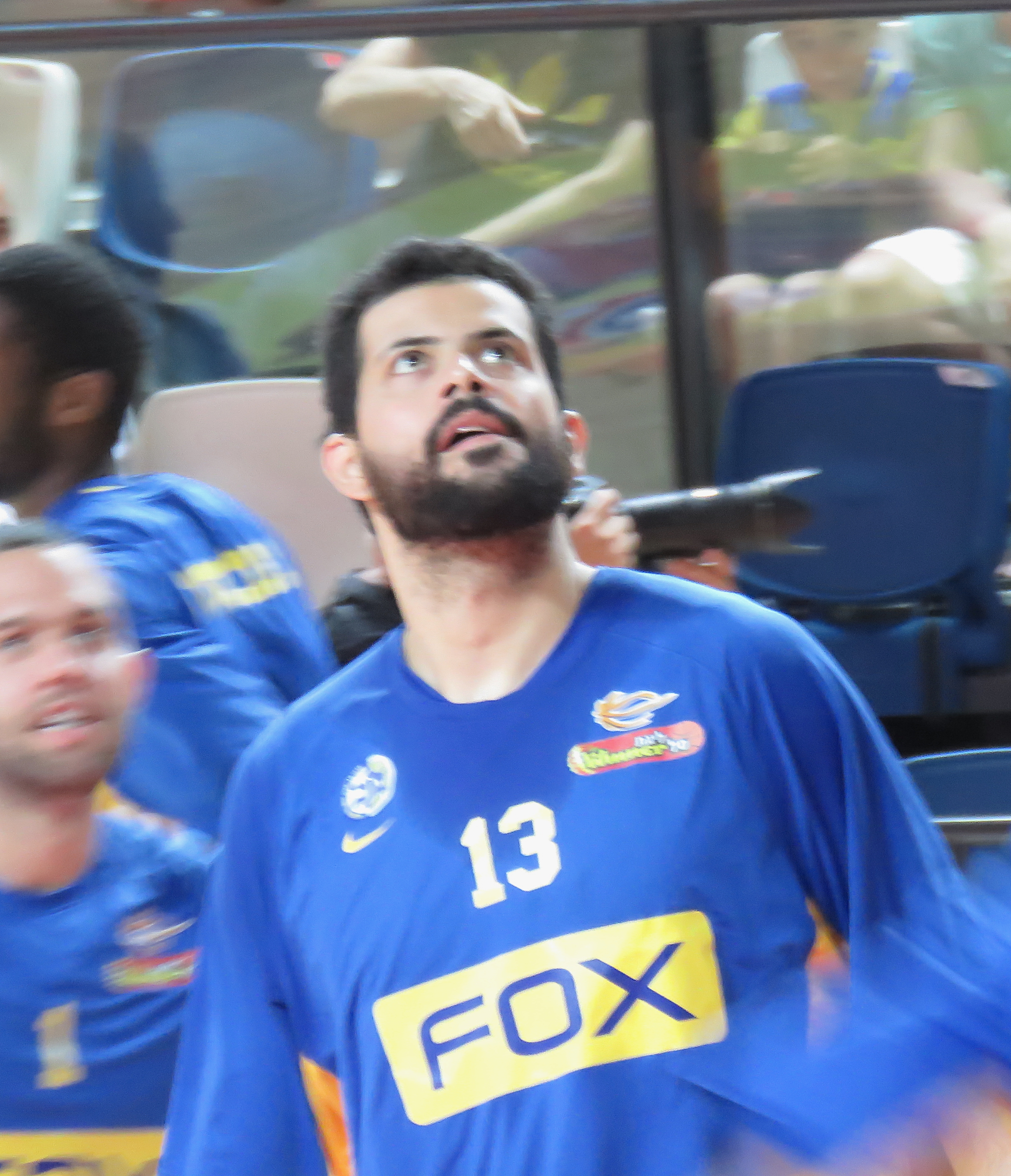
- Faverani with Maccabi Tel Aviv (2015)

No. 13 – Basket Cartagena
- Position: Power forward / center
- League: Primera FEB

Personal information
- Born: May 5, 1988 (age 38) Porto Alegre, Rio Grande do Sul, Brazil
- Listed height: 6 ft 11 in (2.11 m)
- Listed weight: 260 lb (118 kg)

Career information
- NBA draft: 2009: undrafted
- Playing career: 2005–present

Career history
- 2005–2006: Axarquía
- 2006–2009: Málaga
- 2006–2007: →Zaragoza
- 2007–2008: →Gipuzkoa
- 2008–2009: →Axarquía
- 2009–2011: Murcia
- 2011–2013: Valencia
- 2013–2014: Boston Celtics
- 2014: →Maine Red Claws
- 2015: Maccabi Tel Aviv
- 2016–2017: Murcia
- 2017: Barcelona
- 2017–2018: Murcia
- 2018: Gipuzkoa
- 2021–2023: Flamengo
- 2023–2025: São Paulo
- 2025–present: Cartagena

Career highlights
- FIBA Intercontinental Cup champion (2022); LEB Oro champion (2011)
- Stats at NBA.com
- Stats at Basketball Reference

Vítor Luiz Faverani Tatsch (born May 5, 1988) is a Brazilian professional basketball player who plays for Cartagena of the Spanish Primera FEB. He has also represented Brazil in international competition and holds a Spanish passport.

== Professional career ==
=== Spain ===
Faverani arrived in Spain at age 14 and started playing for Unicaja's junior ranks. In 2005, he joined Clínicas Rincón Axarquía of the LEB Oro, the junior team of Unicaja. In 2006, he joined the Unicaja senior team where he made his Liga ACB debut during the 2006–07 season. He also spent time with CAI Zaragoza in 2006–07, playing 24 games in the LEB Oro. For the 2007–08 season, he was loaned to Gipuzkoa BC. In 2008–09, he played seven EuroLeague games for Málaga while also spending time with Clínicas Rincón Axarquía.

After going undrafted in the 2009 NBA draft, Faverani parted ways with Málaga on August 26, 2009. The next day, he signed with CB Murcia.

After two seasons with Murcia, Faverani signed a two-year deal (with the option of a third) with Valencia Basket on July 19, 2011. On September 1, 2012, he extended his contract with the club through the 2014–15 season. However, following the 2012–13 season, he parted ways with Valencia in the hopes of signing in the NBA.

=== Boston Celtics ===
On July 22, 2013, Faverani signed a three-year deal with the Boston Celtics. During his rookie season, he had multiple assignments with the Maine Red Claws of the NBA Development League. On March 7, 2014, he underwent successful left knee arthroscopy to repair a torn lateral meniscus, subsequently sidelining him for the rest of the season. On December 18, 2014, he was waived by the Celtics following the Rajon Rondo trade; he did not make an appearance for the Celtics in 2014–15.

=== Maccabi Tel Aviv ===
On July 10, 2015, Faverani signed with the Israeli club Maccabi Tel Aviv. On November 2, he was waived by Maccabi after appearing in only two official games.

=== Return to Spain ===
On December 30, 2015, Faverani returned to UCAM Murcia. On January 15, 2017, FC Barcelona Lassa bought him out, for €250,000, from UCAM Murcia and he signed a two-year deal with Barcelona. On May 18, 2017, Faverani and Barcelona mutually parted ways.

On July 26, 2017, Faverani returned to UCAM Murcia for the 2017–18 season. On August 26, 2018, Faverani signed a one-year deal with Delteco GBC of the Liga ACB.

=== Flamengo ===
In June 2021, Faverani returned to playing basketball after a three-year absence, when he signed a one-year contract in Brazil with Flamengo. He had been using the training facilities of team since January. It marked the first time Faverani played professionally in his native country.

In September 2025, Faverani signed for Basket Cartagena in the Primera FEB, the second tier of Spanish basketball.

== NBA career statistics ==
Legend
GP	Games played	GS	Games started	MPG	Minutes per game
FG%	Field goal percentage	3P%	3-point field goal percentage	FT%	Free throw percentage
RPG	Rebounds per game	APG	Assists per game	SPG	Steals per game
BPG	Blocks per game	PPG	Points per game	**Bold**	Career high

=== Regular season ===
Year	Team	GP	GS	MPG	FG%	3P%	FT%	RPG	APG	SPG	BPG	PPG
2013–14	Boston	37	8	13.2	.435	.300	.649	3.5	.4	.4	.7	4.4
Career		37	8	13.2	.435	.300	.649	3.5	.4	.4	.7	4.4

== Career statistics ==
=== Domestic leagues ===
Season	Team	League	GP	MPG	FG%	3P%	FT%	RPG	APG	SPG	BPG	PPG
2005-06	Clínicas Rincón	LEB Plata	29	18.4	.567	.167	.607	4.6	.1	.3	.3	8.0
2006-07	Unicaja	Liga ACB	2	4.6	.667	---	1.00	.5	.0	.0	.0	4.5
2006-07	CAI Zaragoza	LEB Oro	24	18.0	.557	.667	.705	5.5	.4	.3	.3	8.5
2007-08	Bruesa GBC	LEB Oro	33	12.2	.558	.286	.549	2.8	.1	.3	.6	5.6
2008-09	Clínicas Rincón	LEB Oro	27	21.1	.473	.407	.741	5.8	.4	.3	.1	12.3
2008-09	Unicaja	Liga ACB	2	6.3	.000	.250	1.00	1.0	.0	.0	.5	2.5
2009-10	CB Murcia	Liga ACB	27	15.2	.526	.340	.559	3.9	.3	.4	.7	6.4
2010-11	CB Murcia	LEB Oro	34	22.5	.707	.330	.791	6.4	.7	.5	1.5	14.9
2011-12	Valencia Basket	Liga ACB	35	16.7	.578	.273	.662	3.7	.4	.3	.5	7.9
2012-13	Valencia Basket	Liga ACB	23	17.4	.594	.188	.793	4.6	.7	.3	.7	9.3
2013-14	Maine Red Claws	D-League	4	32.4	.541	.538	.789	11.0	3.0	.5	1.3	19.0
2015-16	UCAM Murcia	Liga ACB	21	21.5	.615	.261	.627	5.0	.7	.6	.4	10.5
2016-17	UCAM Murcia	Liga ACB	15	20.7	.568	.400	.774	4.5	.6	.4	.3	9.7
