= Pedro Llompart =

Spanish basketball player

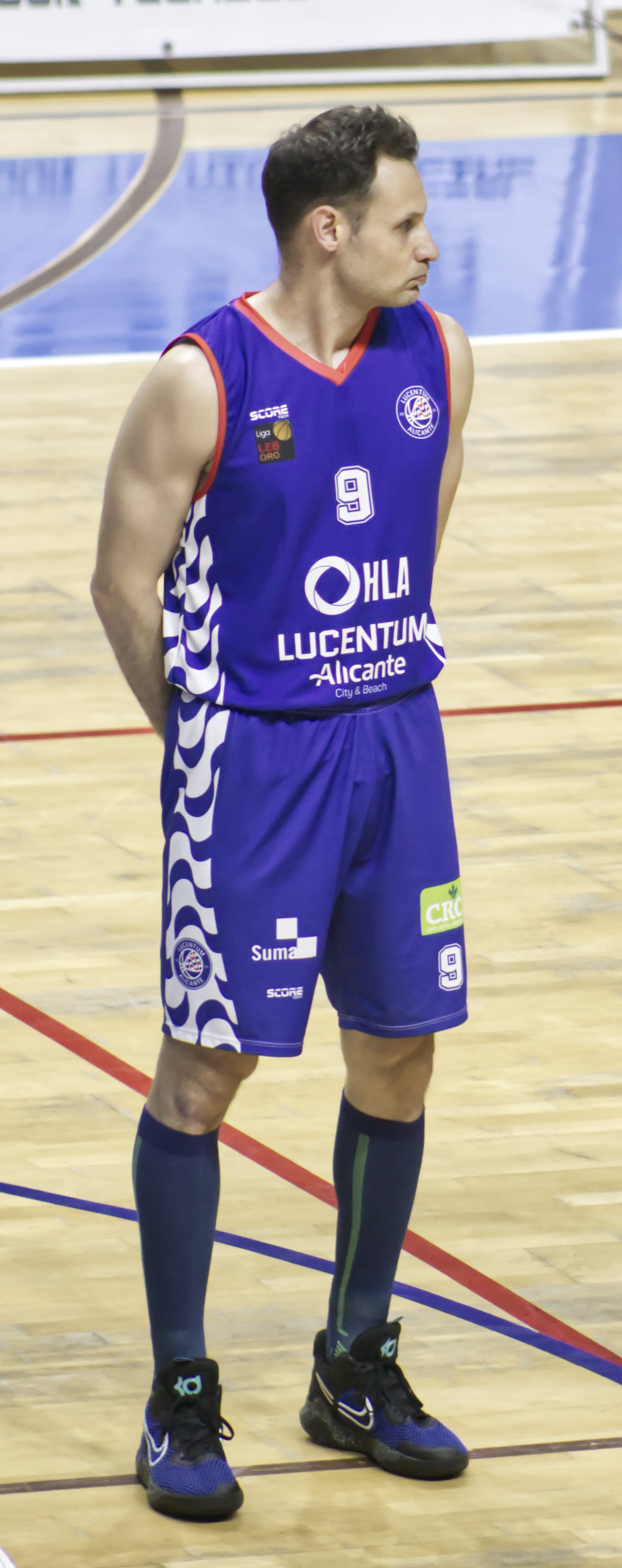

Fundación Lucentum Baloncesto
- Position: Point guard
- League: LEB Oro

Personal information
- Born: 9 January 1982 (age 43) Palma, Spain
- Listed height: 1.85 m (6 ft 1 in)
- Listed weight: 84 kg (185 lb)

Career information
- NBA draft: 2004: undrafted
- Playing career: 2000–present

Career history
- 2000–2001: Murcia
- 2001–2002: El Ejido
- 2002–2003: Amics Castelló
- 2003–2007: Valencia
- 2005: →Murcia
- 2005–2006: →Palma Aqua Màgica
- 2007–2008: Tenerife
- 2008–2012: Lucentum Alicante
- 2012–2015: CAI Zaragoza
- 2015–2016: San Sebastián Gipuzkoa
- 2016–2017: Murcia
- 2017: Valencia
- 2017: Iberostar Tenerife
- 2017–2019: Reggiana
- 2019–present: HLA Alicante

Career highlights
- Spanish Supercup winner (2017)

Pedro Llompart Usón (born 9 January 1982) is a Spanish professional basketball player who last played for HLA Alicante of the Spanish LEB Oro.

== Career ==
Llompart made his debut at Liga ACB on 9 October 2003, with Pamesa Valencia, playing 53 seconds in the defeat against Adecco Estudiantes by 76–78.

He was loaned several seasons to teams of the LEB Oro until he left Pamesa Valencia on 2007 for signing with Tenerife Baloncesto. Llompart came back to Liga ACB on 2009, after promoting from LEB Oro with Lucentum Alicante. He played in the team of the Valencian Community until 2012, when Lucentum Alicante is relegated by its financial trouble and he signs with CAI Zaragoza. On 24 July 2015, he parted ways with Zaragoza.

In July 2015, Llompart signed a two-year contract with Gipuzkoa Basket.

On 22 November 2017 Llompart signed a two-month deal with the Italian basketball club Pallacanestro Reggiana. In the 2017-18 season he averaged 7.1 points and 4.4 assists per game while shooting 53% from the three-point line. He re-signed with the club on 30 June 2018.
