= Justin Doellman =

American-Kosovan basketball player

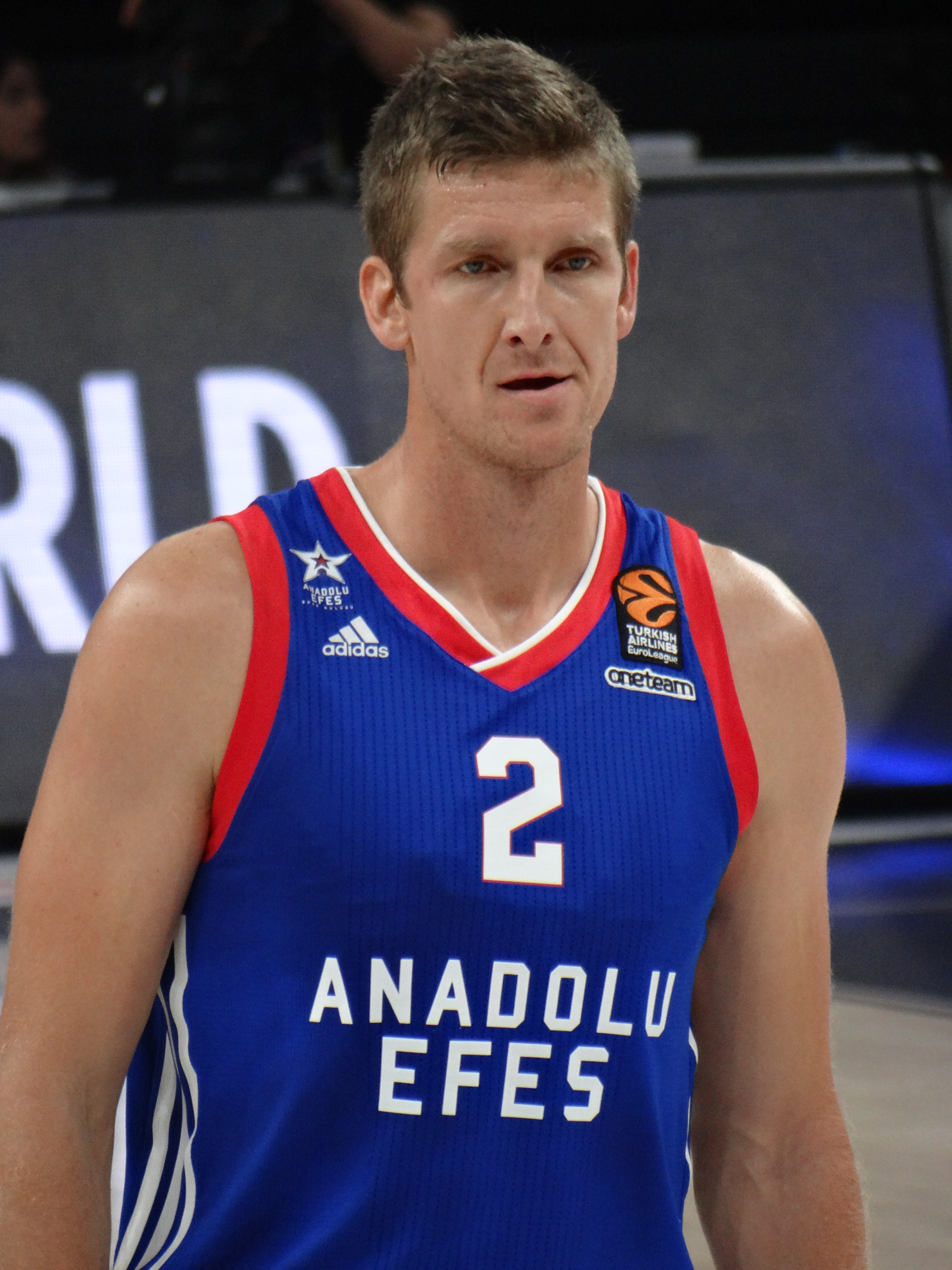
- Doellman with Anadolu Efes, in 2017.

Personal information
- Born: 3 February 1985 (age 41) Cincinnati, Ohio, U.S.
- Listed height: 6 ft 9 in (2.06 m)
- Listed weight: 225 lb (102 kg)

Career information
- High school: Ryle (Union, Kentucky)
- College: Xavier (2003–2007)
- NBA draft: 2007: undrafted
- Playing career: 2007–2018
- Position: Power forward

Career history
- 2007–2008: Cholet
- 2008–2009: Besançon
- 2009–2010: Orléans Loiret
- 2010–2011: Lucentum Alicante
- 2011–2012: Manresa
- 2012–2014: Valencia Basket
- 2014–2017: Barcelona
- 2017: Anadolu Efes
- 2018: Budućnost
- 2018: Manresa

Career highlights
- EuroCup champion (2014); 2× All-EuroCup First Team (2013, 2014); EuroCup Finals MVP (2014); Liga ACB MVP (2014); All-Liga ACB Team (2014); ABA League champion (2018); First-team All-Atlantic 10 (2007)

Justin Joseph Doellman (born 3 February 1985) is an American-born naturalized Kosovan former professional basketball player. Standing at 6 ft 9 in (2.06 m), he played at the power forward position.

== College career ==
Doellman played four years of Division I college basketball at Xavier University, playing with the Xavier Musketeers. He averaged 10.6 points and 5.4 rebounds per game in the NCAA.

== Professional career ==
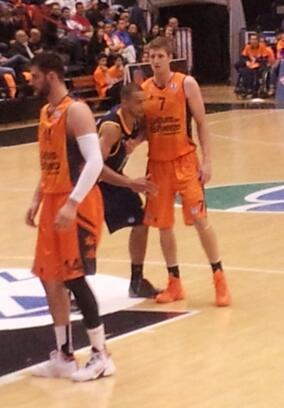
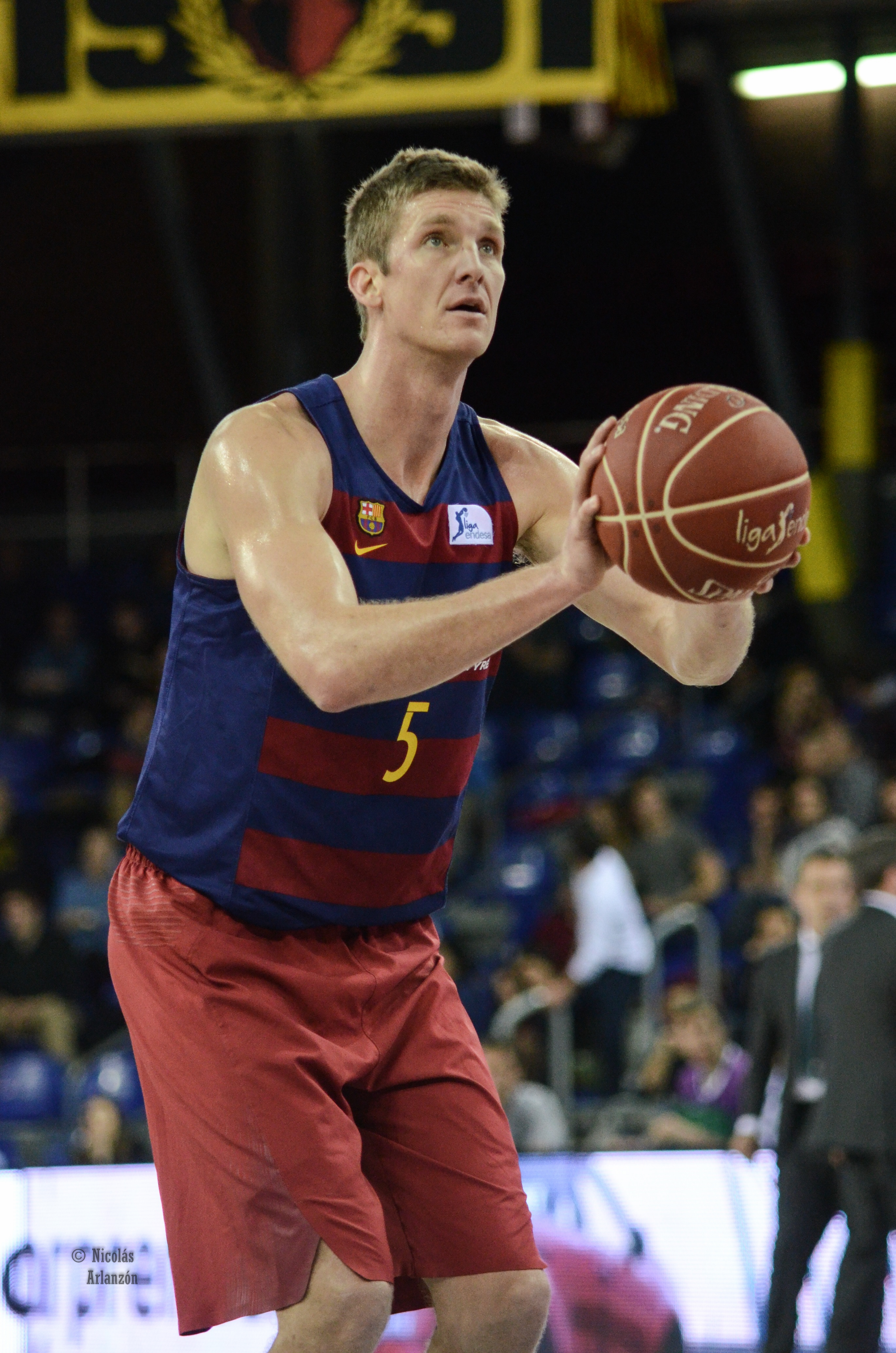
Doellman with Valencia (left) and Barcelona (right)

Doellman started his pro career in France, where he spent three years in the LNB Pro A.

In 2010, he signed with Liga ACB squad Meridiano Alicante, where he averaged 13.1 points and 6.2 rebounds in the Spanish League, and in the next summer, he played for Assignia Manresa, where he became the second top scorer of the Spanish league, with 16.8 points per game. He was also voted the Spanish League's MVP of the Month for the month of January.

In 2012, and after a great season, Doellman left Manresa to join Valencia, where he signed for the next two seasons. He was named to the All-EuroCup First Team in 2013 and 2014. With Valencia, he won the 2013–14 season of the EuroCup, and he was named the EuroCup Finals MVP. He was also named the ACB Most Valuable Player of the 2013–14 ACB season. On 1 July 2014, Valencia announced that Doellman decided not to extend his contract with Valencia.

On 9 July 2014, Doellman signed a two-year contract with Barcelona. On 28 July 2016, he re-signed with Barcelona for three more seasons. On 16 June 2017, Barcelona parted ways with Doellman.

On 11 October 2017, Doellman signed with Turkish club Anadolu Efes for the 2017–18 season. In November 2017, he parted ways with Efes. On 16 January 2018, he signed with Montenegrin club Budućnost for the rest of the season.

On 19 July 2018, Doellman signed a one-year deal with Baxi Manresa of the Liga ACB.

== Kosovan national team ==
Doellman took Kosovan citizenship, and agreed to play with the senior men's Kosovan national basketball team, at the EuroBasket 2017's qualification tournament.

== Career statistics ==
Legend
GP	Games played	GS	Games started	MPG	Minutes per game
FG%	Field-goal percentage	3P%	3-point field-goal percentage	FT%	Free-throw percentage
RPG	Rebounds per game	APG	Assists per game	SPG	Steals per game
BPG	Blocks per game	PPG	Points per game	PIR	Performance index rating
**Bold**	Career high

=== EuroLeague ===
Year	Team	GP	GS	MPG	FG%	3P%	FT%	RPG	APG	SPG	BPG	PPG	PIR
2009–10	Orléans	9	4	22.8	.475	.289	.833	**4.3**	.7	**1.8**	**.4**	**12.4**	**12.8**
2014–15	Barcelona	26	23	**24.2**	.428	.355	.889	**4.3**	**1.2**	.8	.2	9.8	10.5
2015–16	Barcelona	**28**	**25**	**24.2**	**.483**	.429	.878	4.0	.9	1.2	.1	9.6	10.5
2016–17	Barcelona	15	14	20.0	.409	**.536**	**.947**	3.1	1.2	.9	.1	7.8	8.4
Career		63	52	24.0	.459	.368	.873	4.2	1.0	1.1	.2	10.1	10.8

=== Domestic leagues ===
Season	Team	League	GP	MPG	FG%	3P%	FT%	RPG	APG	SPG	BPG	PPG
2007–08	Cholet Basket	LNB Pro A	12	19.3	.384	.350	.733	2.5	1.7	.8	.3	7.6
2008–09	Besançon BCD	LNB Pro A	30	29.1	.463	.359	.886	5.9	1.9	1.4	.3	14.7
2009–10	Orléans	LNB Pro A	32	23.3	.452	.340	.833	4.6	2.0	1.3	.6	9.8
2010–11	Meridiano Alicante	Liga ACB	34	29.1	.475	.378	.783	6.2	1.4	1.1	.5	13.1
2011–12	Assignia Manresa	Liga ACB	34	29.7	.475	.319	.768	4.5	1.9	1.5	.6	16.8
2012–13	Valencia BC	Liga ACB	36	26.5	.530	.364	.872	4.3	1.3	1.9	.4	15.9
2013–14	Valencia BC	Liga ACB	40	26.8	.515	.390	.872	4.6	2.5	1.5	.8	14.8
2014–15	FC Barcelona Lassa	Liga ACB	42	23.0	.515	.425	.863	4.6	1.4	1.1	.3	11.5
2015–16	FC Barcelona Lassa	Liga ACB	40	24.6	.490	.431	.830	5.0	1.6	1.1	.3	11.9

== Trophies and achievements ==
=== Trophies ===
- Cholet:
  - French Leaders Cup: (2008)
- Valencia:
  - EuroCup: (2014)
- Budućnost:
  - Montenegrin Cup (2018)
  - ABA League champion (2018)

=== Achievements ===
- Xavier:
  - Blackburn/McCafferty Trophy: (2007)
- Assignia Manresa:
  - Spanish ACB League Player of the Month: (January 2012)
- Valencia:
  - Spanish ACB League Player of the Month: (May 2013)
  - 2× All-EuroCup First Team: (2013, 2014)
  - EuroCup Finals MVP: (2014)
  - All-Spanish League Team: (2014)
  - Spanish ACB League MVP: (2014)
