= 2010–11 ACB season =

- League: Liga ACB
- Sport: Basketball
- Games: 306 (regular season); 18 (playoffs)
- Teams: 18
- TV partner: Televisión Española

Regular Season
- Season champions: Regal FC Barcelona
- Season MVP: (Spain) Fernando San Emeterio (Caja Laboral)
- Top scorer: (United States) Jaycee Carroll (Gran Canaria 2014)

Playoffs

ACB Finals
- Champions: Regal FC Barcelona
- Finals MVP: (Spain) Juan Carlos Navarro

ACB seasons
- ← 2009–10 2011–12 →

The 2010–11 ACB season is the 28th season of the Liga ACB. The regular season started on September 30, 2010, and ended on May 15, 2011. Playoffs started on May 19, 2011, and ended on June 14. Regal FC Barcelona won their 16th title.

== Promotion and relegation ==
Teams promoted from 2009–2010 LEB

- CAI Zaragoza
- ViveMenorca

Teams relegated to 2010–2011 LEB Oro

- Xacobeo Blu:Sens
- CB Murcia

== Team information ==
Last updated: 1 October 2010

=== Stadia and locations ===
Location of teams in ACB League 2010–11
Location of teams in ACB League 2010–11 (Canary Islands)

Team	Home city	Stadium	Capacity
Asefa Estudiantes	Madrid	Palacio de los Deportes Palacio de Vistalegre	15,000 (both)
Assignia Manresa	Manresa	Nou Congost	5,000
Baloncesto Fuenlabrada	Fuenlabrada	Fernando Martin	5,000
Bizkaia Bilbao Basket	Bilbao	Bilbao Arena	8,500
Blancos de Rueda Valladolid	Valladolid	Polideportivo Pisuerga	6,300
CAI Zaragoza	Zaragoza	Príncipe Felipe Arena	12,000
Caja Laboral	Vitoria-Gasteiz	Fernando Buesa Arena	9,900
Cajasol	Sevilla	Palacio San Pablo	10,200
CB Granada	Granada	Palacio Municipal de Deportes	7,500
DKV Joventut	Badalona	Palau Municipal d'Esports	12,500
Gran Canaria 2014	Las Palmas de Gran Canaria	Centro Insular de Deportes	5,000
Lagun Aro GBC	San Sebastián	San Sebastián Arena	11,000
Menorca Bàsquet	Mahón	Pabellón Menorca	5,115
Meridiano Alicante	Alicante	Centro de Tecnificación	5,425
Real Madrid	Madrid	Caja Mágica	12,000
Power Electronics Valencia	Valencia	Fuente San Luis	9,000
Regal FC Barcelona	Barcelona	Palau Blaugrana	8,250
Unicaja	Málaga	Martín Carpena Arena	10,500

=== Head coaches ===
Team	Head coach	Seasons as head coach
Asefa Estudiantes	(Spain) Luis Casimiro	3
Assignia Manresa	(Spain) Jaume Ponsarnau	5
Baloncesto Fuenlabrada	(Spain) Salva Maldonado	2
Bizkaia Bilbao Basket	(Greece) Fotis Katsikaris	2
Blancos de Rueda Valladolid	(Spain) Porfirio Fisac	3
CAI Zaragoza	(Spain) José Luis Abós	2
Caja Laboral	(Montenegro) Duško Ivanović	8
Cajasol	(Spain) Joan Plaza	2
CB Granada	(Spain) Curro Segura^{3}	3
DKV Joventut	(Spain) Pepu Hernández	2
Gran Canaria 2014	(Spain) Pedro Martínez	5
Lagun Aro GBC	(Spain) Pablo Laso	4
Menorca Bàsquet	(Spain) Paco Olmos	2
Meridiano Alicante	(Spain) Txus Vidorreta^{2}	4
Real Madrid	(Italy) Emanuele Molin^{4}	2
Power Electronics Valencia	(Serbia) Svetislav Pešić^{1}	1
Regal FC Barcelona	(Spain) Xavi Pascual	4
Unicaja	(Spain) Chus Mateo^{3}	3

^{1}Coach Manuel Hussein was sacked after the day 6. Chechu Mulero was the coach in the game 7.
^{2}Óscar Quintana was sacked after the day 8.
^{3}Aíto Gª Reneses and Trifón Poch, sacked after the day 17. ^{4}He took the team after Ettore Messina renouncing.

== Team Standings ==
Direct access to 2011–12 Euroleague via league position
Clinched playoff berth
Relegated

Italics indicate holder of a Euroleague Basketball (company) "A License", giving the team automatic access to the 2011–12 Euroleague regardless of league position.

#	Team	Pld	W	L	PF	PA
1	Regal FC Barcelona	34	27	7	2614	2245
2	Real Madrid	34	26	8	2629	2401
3	Power Electronics Valencia	34	24	10	2570	2414
4	Caja Laboral	34	23	11	2693	2509
5	Gran Canaria 2014	34	21	13	2560	2405
6	Bizkaia Bilbao Basket	34	21	13	2643	2514
7	Baloncesto Fuenlabrada	34	20	14	2611	2580
8	Unicaja	34	19	15	2582	2461
9	Blancos de Rueda Valladolid	34	18	16	2465	2462
10	CAI Zaragoza	34	16	18	2551	2641
11	Cajasol	34	16	18	2513	2499
12	Asefa Estudiantes	34	16	18	2476	2540
13	DKV Joventut	34	14	20	2586	2827
14	Lagun Aro GBC	34	12	22	2510	2594
15	Assignia Manresa	34	10	24	2222	2428
16	Meridiano Alicante	34	9	25	2348	2461
17	CB Granada	34	7	27	2351	2627
18	Menorca Bàsquet	34	7	27	2325	2596

== Playoffs ==
Quarter Finals
1	Regal FC Barcelona	2
8	Unicaja	0
4	Caja Laboral	2
5	Gran Canaria 2014	0
2	Real Madrid	2
7	B. Fuenlabrada	0
3	PE Valencia	0
6	Bizkaia Bilbao	2

Semifinals
1	Regal FC Barcelona	3
4	Caja Laboral	0
2	Real Madrid	1
6	Bizkaia Bilbao	3

Finals
1	Regal FC Barcelona	3
6	Bizkaia Bilbao	0

== Stats Leaders ==
=== Points ===
Rank	Name	Team	Points	Games	PPG
1.	(United States) Jaycee Carroll	Gran Canaria 2014	668	34	19.6
2.	(Spain) Juan Carlos Navarro	Regal FC Barcelona	444	27	16.4
3.	(United States) Will McDonald	DKV Joventut	519	34	15.3
4.	(United States) Jimmy Baron Jr.	Lagun Aro GBC	511	34	15.0
5.	(United States) Nik Caner-Medley	Asefa Estudiantes	447	31	14.4

=== Rebounds ===
Rank	Name	Team	Rebounds	Games	RPG
1.	(United States) Nik Caner-Medley	Asefa Estudiantes	236	31	7.61
2.	(Croatia) Stanko Barać	Caja Laboral	218	31	7.03
3.	(United States) Jakim Donaldson	Menorca Bàsquet	236	34	6.94
4.	(Uruguay) Esteban Batista	Caja Laboral	221	34	6.50
5.	(Mexico) Gustavo Ayón	Baloncesto Fuenlabrada	208	33	6.30

=== Assists ===
Rank	Name	Team	Assists	Games	APG
1.	(Brazil) Marcelinho Huertas	Caja Laboral	200	34	5.88
2.	(United States) Omar Cook	Power Electronics Valencia	187	34	5.50
3.	(Argentina) Diego Ciorciari	Menorca Bàsquet	167	34	4.91
4.	(Latvia) Kristaps Valters	Baloncesto Fuenlabrada	144	32	4.50
5.	(Spain) Ricky Rubio	Regal FC Barcelona	149	34	4.38

== Awards ==
=== Regular season MVP ===
- Fernando San Emeterio - Caja Laboral

=== All-ACB team ===
Position	Player	Team
PG	(Brazil) Marcelinho Huertas	Caja Laboral
SG	(United States) Jaycee Carroll	Gran Canaria 2014
SF	(Spain) Fernando San Emeterio	Caja Laboral
PF	(United States) Nik Caner-Medley	Asefa Estudiantes
C	(Croatia) Ante Tomić	Real Madrid

=== Best Coach ===
- Xavi Pascual - Regal FC Barcelona

=== ACB Rising Star Award ===
- Gustavo Ayón – Baloncesto Fuenlabrada

=== MVP Week by Week ===
Date	Player	Team	Efficiency
1	(United States) Rob Kurz	CB Granada	30
2	(Uruguay) Esteban Batista	Baloncesto Fuenlabrada	35
3	(Bosnia and Herzegovina) Mirza Teletović	Caja Laboral	27
4	(Spain) Felipe Reyes	Real Madrid	34
5	(Australia) David Barlow	CAI Zaragoza	30
6	(Argentina) Fede Van Lacke	Blancos de Rueda Valladolid	35
7	(United States) Jakim Donaldson	Menorca Bàsquet	30
8	(United States) Nik Caner-Medley	Asefa Estudiantes	32
9	(Croatia) Stanko Barać	Caja Laboral (2)	35
10	(Spain) Víctor Claver (Spain) Felipe Reyes (2)	Power Electronics Valencia; Real Madrid (2)	28
11	(United States) Paul Davis	Cajasol	33
12	(Uruguay) Esteban Batista (2)	Baloncesto Fuenlabrada (2)	29
13	(United States) Russell Robinson	DKV Joventut	30
14	(Canada) Carl English	DKV Joventut (2)	32
15	(United States) Jakim Donaldson (2) (United States) Rob Kurz (2) (United States) Andy Panko	Menorca Bàsquet (2); CB Granada (2); Lagun Aro GBC	30
16	(Argentina) Paolo Quinteros	CAI Zaragoza (2)	37
17	(United States Virgin Islands) Cuthbert Victor	Menorca Bàsquet (3)	30
18	(Dominican Republic) Eulis Báez	Blancos de Rueda Valladolid (3)	32
19	(Spain) Fernando San Emeterio	Caja Laboral (3)	38
20	(United States) Coby Karl	CB Granada (3)	31
21	(United States) Nik Caner-Medley (2)	Asefa Estudiantes (2)	33
22	(Croatia) Stanko Barać (2)	Caja Laboral (4)	30
23	(United States) Nik Caner-Medley (3)	Asefa Estudiantes (3)	37
24	(United States) Andy Panko (2)	Lagun Aro GBC (2)	41
25	(United States) Gerald Fitch	Unicaja	32
26	(United States) Jaycee Carroll (Slovenia) Uros Slokar	Gran Canaria 2014; Assignia Manresa	32
27	(United States) Jakim Donaldson (3)	Menorca Bàsquet (3)	34
28	(United States) Jaycee Carroll (2)	Gran Canaria 2014 (2)	33
29	(United States) Jaycee Carroll (3)	Gran Canaria 2014 (3)	38
30	(Argentina) Nico Gianella	CB Granada (4)	29
31	(United States) Nik Caner-Medley (4)	Asefa Estudiantes (4)	36
32	(United States) Jaycee Carroll (4) (Brazil) Rafael Hettsheimeir	Gran Canaria 2014 (4); CAI Zaragoza (3)	32
33	(Spain) Álex Mumbrú	Bizkaia Bilbao Basket	27
34	(United States) D'or Fischer	Real Madrid (3)	33

=== Player of the month ===
Month	Week	Player	Team	Efficiency	Source
October	1–5	(Spain) Carlos Suárez	Real Madrid	22.4	Archived 2014-02-02 at the Wayback Machine
November	6–9	(Croatia) Stanko Barać	Caja Laboral	24.5	Archived 2011-01-02 at the Wayback Machine
December	10–13	(Spain) Victor Claver	Power Electronics Valencia	18.8	Archived 2011-01-02 at the Wayback Machine
January	14–19	(Canada) Carl English	DKV Joventut	27.2	Archived 2014-02-02 at the Wayback Machine
February	20–22	(United States) Nik Caner-Medley	Asefa Estudiantes	26.7	Archived 2011-03-02 at the Wayback Machine
March	22–27	(United States) Nik Caner-Medley	Asefa Estudiantes	22.4	Archived 2011-05-02 at the Wayback Machine
April	27–31	(United States) Nik Caner-Medley	Asefa Estudiantes	23.7	Archived 2011-04-30 at the Wayback Machine
May	32–34	(United States) Jaycee Carroll	Gran Canaria 2014	23	Archived 2011-05-21 at the Wayback Machine

Last updated: 30 April 2011.
Source: ACB
