= 2011–12 ACB season =

Liga Endesa^{1}
- Duration: 8 October 2011 – 16 June 2012
- Games played: 306 (regular season); 23 (playoffs)
- Teams: 18

Regular season
- Season MVP: (United States) Andy Panko
- Relegated: Asefa Estudiantes; Blancos de Rueda Valladolid

Finals
- Champions: FC Barcelona (17th title)
- Runners-up: Real Madrid
- Semi-finalists: Valencia; Caja Laboral
- Finals MVP: (Slovenia) Erazem Lorbek

Awards
- Rising Star: (United States) Micah Downs
- Best Coach: (Spain) Xavi Pascual

Statistical leaders
Points	(United States) Andy Panko	18.9
Rebounds	(United States) James Augustine	8.3
Assists	(Spain) Javi Rodríguez	6.2
Index Rating	(United States) James Augustine	18.6
- ^{1} Sponsored league name, referring to Endesa.

The 2011–12 ACB season is the 29th season of the Liga ACB, called also Liga Endesa due to sponsorship reasons.

The regular season started on 8 October 2011 and ended on 6 May 2012. Playoffs started on 17 May 2011 and ended on 16 June. FC Barcelona Regal won their 17th title, the second in a row.

== Teams and venues ==
- Relegated to LEB Oro
  - CB Granada (17th)
  - Menorca Bàsquet (18th)
- Promoted from LEB Oro
  - CB Murcia (Champion)
  - Blu:sens Monbús (2nd)

Team	Home city	Stadium	Capacity	Last season	Head coach	Season
Asefa Estudiantes	Madrid	Palacio de los Deportes	15,000	11th	(Spain) Trifón Poch	1st
Assignia Manresa	Manresa	Nou Congost	5,000	15th	(Spain) Jaume Ponsarnau	6th
Banca Cívica	Sevilla	Palacio San Pablo	10,200	11th	(Spain) Joan Plaza	3rd
Blancos de Rueda Valladolid	Valladolid	Polideportivo Pisuerga	6,300	9th	(Spain) Roberto González	1st
Blu:sens Monbús	Santiago de Compostela	Multiusos Fontes do Sar	6,000	2nd (LEB Oro)	(Spain) Moncho Fernández	2nd
CAI Zaragoza	Zaragoza	Príncipe Felipe Arena	12,000	10th	(Spain) José Luis Abós	3rd
Caja Laboral	Vitoria-Gasteiz	Fernando Buesa Arena^{1}	15,374	4th	(Montenegro) Duško Ivanović	9th (4th)
FC Barcelona Regal	Barcelona	Palau Blaugrana	8,250	1st	(Spain) Xavi Pascual	5th
FIATC Mutua Joventut	Badalona	Palau Municipal d'Esports	12,500	13th	(Spain) Salva Maldonado	1st
Gescrap Bizkaia	Bilbao	Bilbao Arena	10,000	2nd	(Greece) Fotis Katsikaris	3rd
Gran Canaria 2014	Las Palmas de Gran Canaria	Centro Insular de Deportes	5,000	6th	(Spain) Pedro Martínez	6th (3rd)
Lagun Aro GBC	San Sebastián	San Sebastián Arena	11,000	14th	(Spain) Sito Alonso	1st
Lucentum Alicante	Alicante	Centro de Tecnificación	5,425	16th	(Spain) Txus Vidorreta	2nd
Mad-Croc Fuenlabrada	Fuenlabrada	Fernando Martín	5,000	7th	(Spain) Porfirio Fisac	1st
Real Madrid	Madrid	Palacio de los Deportes	15,000	3rd	(Spain) Pablo Laso	1st
UCAM Murcia	Murcia	Palacio de Deportes de Murcia	7,500	1st (LEB Oro)	(Spain) Óscar Quintana	1st
Unicaja	Málaga	Martín Carpena	10,500	8th	(Spain) Luis Casimiro	1st
Valencia Basket	Valencia	Fuente San Luis	9,000	5th	(Croatia) Velimir Perasović	1st

^{1}Caja Laboral plays at Iradier Arena during Fernando Buesa Arena extension to 15,000 seats.

== Managerial changes ==
=== Before the start of the season ===
Team	Outgoing manager	Manner of departure	Replaced by	Date of appointment
Valencia Basket	(Serbia) Svetislav Pešić	End of contract	(Spain) Paco Olmos	6 June 2011
Real Madrid	(Italy) Emanuele Molin	End of contract	(Spain) Pablo Laso	22 June 2011
FIATC Mutua Joventut	(Spain) Pepu Hernández	Sacked	(Spain) Salva Maldonado	4 July 2011
Lagun Aro GBC	(Spain) Pablo Laso	Signed by Real Madrid	(Spain) Sito Alonso	19 July 2011
Blancos de Rueda Valladolid	(Spain) Porfirio Fisac	End of contract	(Spain) Luis Casimiro	20 July 2011
Mad-Croc Fuenlabrada	(Spain) Salva Maldonado	Mutual consent	(Spain) Porfirio Fisac	1 August 2011
Asefa Estudiantes	(Spain) Luis Casimiro	Sacked	(Spain) Pepu Hernández	2 August 2011

=== During the season ===
Team	Outgoing manager	Manner of departure	Date of vacancy	Replaced by	Date of appointment	Position in table
Valencia Basket	(Spain) Paco Olmos	Sacked	22 January 2012	(Croatia) Velimir Perasović	26 January 2012	9th (8–9)
UCAM Murcia	(Spain) Luis Guil	Sacked	30 January 2012	(Spain) Óscar Quintana	31 January 2012	17th (4–14)
Blancos de Rueda Valladolid	(Spain) Luis Casimiro	Sacked	30 January 2012	(Spain) Roberto González	1 February 2012	18th (4–14)
Asefa Estudiantes	(Spain) Pepu Hernández	Mutual consent	6 March 2012	(Spain) Trifón Poch	7 March 2012	17th (6–16)
Unicaja	(Spain) Chus Mateo	Sacked	19 March 2012	(Spain) Luis Casimiro	20 March 2012	10th (13–12)

== Regular season ==
=== League table ===
#	Teams	P	W	L	PF	PA	Qualification or relegation
1	FC Barcelona Regal	34	29	5	2639	2232	Qualified for the Playoffs
2	Real Madrid	34	26	8	2829	2513	Qualified for the Playoffs
3	Caja Laboral	34	23	11	2545	2384	Qualified for the Playoffs
4	Valencia Basket	34	20	14	2531	2401	Qualified for the Playoffs
5	Lagun Aro GBC	34	19	15	2664	2578	Qualified for the Playoffs
6	Gescrap Bizkaia	34	19	15	2642	2615	Qualified for the Playoffs
7	Banca Cívica	34	18	16	2523	2460	Qualified for the Playoffs
8	Lucentum Alicante	34	18	16	2352	2439	Qualified for the Playoffs
9	Unicaja	34	17	17	2509	2562	
10	CAI Zaragoza	34	16	18	2404	2454	
11	FIATC Mutua Joventut	34	16	18	2493	2562	
12	Assignia Manresa	34	15	19	2497	2559	
13	Blu:sens Monbús	34	13	21	2405	2481	
14	Gran Canaria 2014	34	13	21	2268	2395	
15	UCAM Murcia	34	13	21	2439	2512	
16	Mad-Croc Fuenlabrada	34	12	22	2414	2585	
17	Asefa Estudiantes	34	11	23	2394	2573	Relegation to LEB Oro
18	Blancos de Rueda Valladolid	34	9	25	2349	2592	Relegation to LEB Oro

Source: ACB

=== Positions by round ===
Team\Round																																		
	01	02	03	04	05	06	07	08	09	10	11	12	13	14	15	16	17	18	19	20	21	22	23	24	25	26	27	28	29	30	31	32	33	34
FC Barcelona Regal	5	1	2	2	1	1	1	1	1	1	1	2	1	2	2	2	2	2	1	1	1	1	2	2	2	1	1	1	1	1	1	1	1	1
Real Madrid	1	5	3	3	2	3	2	2	2	2	2	1	2	1	1	1	1	1	2	2	2	2	1	1	1	2	2	2	2	2	2	2	2	2
Caja Laboral	3	3	9	10	7	6	4	4	5	4	4	4	4	4	3	4	4	3	3	3	3	3	3	3	3	3	3	3	3	3	3	3	3	3
Valencia Basket	11	6	11	6	5	5	7	6	4	6	7	7	7	7	7	7	9	8	10	9	8	10	8	5	4	4	5	4	4	4	6	5	5	4
Lagun Aro GBC	12	15	17	18	15	16	13	14	16	17	15	13	11	9	8	10	8	7	6	8	6	6	4	4	6	5	4	5	6	5	8	8	6	5
Gescrap Bizkaia	13	9	6	11	9	9	9	11	10	10	9	8	8	10	11	11	10	9	8	6	7	8	11	10	8	6	6	6	5	7	5	4	4	6
Banca Cívica	16	7	4	7	6	8	6	5	7	8	6	6	6	6	6	6	6	6	7	10	10	9	7	9	7	10	8	7	7	6	4	6	7	7
Lucentum Alicante	6	13	10	5	4	4	5	7	6	5	5	5	5	5	5	5	5	5	4	5	5	5	6	8	5	9	7	8	8	8	7	7	8	8
Unicaja	2	2	1	1	3	2	3	3	3	3	3	3	3	3	4	3	3	4	5	4	4	4	5	7	10	8	10	9	11	11	12	12	11	9
CAI Zaragoza	9	12	8	12	13	14	11	10	11	12	11	11	9	8	9	8	11	10	9	7	9	7	9	6	9	7	9	10	9	9	9	9	10	10
FIATC Mutua Joventut	15	11	13	15	12	15	17	12	14	11	13	15	14	14	15	15	14	14	14	14	14	13	13	12	12	14	11	12	12	12	11	11	9	11
Assignia Manresa	4	4	7	4	8	7	8	8	9	9	10	12	13	12	12	12	12	12	11	12	11	11	10	11	11	11	12	11	10	10	10	10	12	12
Blu:sens Monbús	7	10	5	9	10	13	16	17	17	13	16	14	15	16	16	16	16	16	16	15	15	15	15	15	15	15	15	15	16	13	16	15	14	13
Gran Canaria 2014	17	18	14	16	16	17	14	15	12	14	12	10	12	13	14	13	13	13	13	13	13	14	14	14	14	12	13	13	14	14	13	13	13	14
UCAM Murcia	14	16	18	14	17	12	15	16	13	15	17	17	16	17	17	17	17	17	17	17	16	16	16	16	16	16	16	16	15	16	15	16	16	15
Mad-Croc Fuenlabrada	18	17	15	8	11	11	10	9	8	7	8	9	10	11	10	9	7	11	12	11	12	12	12	13	13	13	14	14	13	15	14	14	15	16
Asefa Estudiantes	8	14	16	13	14	10	12	13	15	16	14	16	17	15	13	14	15	15	15	16	17	17	17	17	17	17	17	17	17	17	17	17	17	17
Blancos de Rueda Valladolid	10	8	12	17	18	18	18	18	18	18	18	18	18	18	18	18	18	18	18	18	18	18	18	18	18	18	18	18	18	18	18	18	18	18

Source: ACB

=== Results ===
	ASE	ASS	BCS	BRV	OBR	CAI	CLA	FCB	CJB	GBB	GCA	GBC	ALI	MCF	RMB	UCM	UNI	VBC
Asefa Estudiantes		76–70	64–77	69–62	79–62	67–63	54–74	65–80	56–71	69–71	61–52	62–58	68–76	72–76	90–85	80–86	75–84	71–69
Assignia Manresa	78–75		76–71	80–75	86–77	74–81	72–70	71–77	71–59	81–73	69–60	74–79	62–76	80–59	93–96	83–74	86–68	68–89
Banca Cívica	89–61	76–65		87–73	79–59	77–64	66–73	81–75	73–77	108–110	75–70	59–63	86–61	97–99	63–98	76–60	68–72	65–58
Blancos de Rueda Valladolid	68–79	79–70	72–77		81–75	58–73	64–76	86–92	86–67	73–81	70–89	89–86	69–57	69–66	72–84	65–76	76–83	74–65
Blu:sens Monbús	61–58	61–49	70–77	63–72		89–84	89–87	83–89	73–60	65–79	65–45	80–88	69–73	77–85	69–83	69–62	71–78	76–62
CAI Zaragoza	75–72	72–71	65–59	75–74	80–71		86–66	49–68	96–73	59–62	63–61	77–86	65–49	80–78	67–84	67–59	76–59	71–63
Caja Laboral	89–74	65–76	73–60	67–65	72–53	75–65		71–60	66–68	100–70	71–67	86–74	65–55	61–51	67–66	71–65	90–68	72–82
FC Barcelona Regal	97–51	74–61	63–66	77–67	71–58	71–68	97–89		82–70	91–72	65–49	77–61	65–49	86–59	86–83	90–53	72–62	76–72
FIATC Mutua Joventut	74–71	92–79	83–65	83–73	73–67	85–63	57–74	52–79		91–67	73–81	70–93	76–62	62–73	78–75	71–65	80–64	81–73
Gescrap Bizkaia	72–66	88–60	67–75	89–77	79–71	68–57	79–80	65–72	78–72		78–72	87–93	73–60	92–81	86–82	95–80	80–83	85–74
Gran Canaria 2014	73–65	63–77	66–74	64–59	84–73	72–62	68–77	93–90	77–71	77–71		45–78	61–53	70–65	60–68	66–54	60–49	63–71
Lagun Aro GBC	103–81	88–82	67–65	71–62	68–71	76–75	81–73	56–71	90–85	76–77	93–78		68–71	86–70	98–90	67–71	92–95	80–86
Lucentum Alicante	65–83	76–70	86–82	91–64	63–64	77–75	72–71	57–83	84–78	81–77	58–55	79–68		66–55	86–92	63–62	77–97	65–70
Mad-Croc Fuenlabrada	88–80	73–79	70–75	65–54	63–82	88–95	87–92	56–66	55–72	82–73	69–65	71–63	60–64		57–79	89–73	80–78	68–90
Real Madrid	85–80	83–61	78–65	76–55	81–67	85–71	84–73	78–74	95–82	90–93	90–72	82–74	91–87	88–70		80–79	64–51	81–64
UCAM Murcia	88–75	78–60	65–58	85–56	60–85	76–62	67–75	54–62	76–54	73–69	76–60	85–89	78–82	71–65	60–91		86–77	83–86
Unicaja	67–74	81–96	75–66	78–51	54–69	79–57	79–66	57–89	89–88	78–73	85–68	81–89	72–60	79–65	80–96	87–79		58–68
Valencia Basket	85–71	75–67	80–84	76–59	77–71	82–66	63–68	68–72	90–67	66–63	77–62	69–60	67–70	69–76	83–66	87–80	75–62	

Source: ACB

== Playoffs ==
Quarter Finals
1	FC Barcelona Regal	2
8	Lucentum Alicante	0
4	Valencia Basket	2
5	Lagun Aro GBC	1
2	Real Madrid	2
7	Banca Cívica	0
3	Caja Laboral	2
6	Gescrap Bizkaia	0

Semifinals
1	FC Barcelona Regal	3
4	Valencia Basket	1
2	Real Madrid	3
3	Caja Laboral	2

Finals
1	FC Barcelona Regal	3
2	Real Madrid	2

== Stats Leaders ==
=== Performance Index Rating ===
Rank	Name	Team	Rating	Games	PIR
1.	(United States) James Augustine	UCAM Murcia	631	34	18.6
2.	(Bulgaria) Kaloyan Ivanov	Lucentum Alicante	576	33	17.5
3.	(United States) Andy Panko	Lagun Aro GBC	579	34	17.0
4.	(United Kingdom) Joel Freeland	Unicaja	516	31	16.6
5.	(United States) Paul Davis	Banca Cívica	480	29	16.6

=== Points ===
Rank	Name	Team	Points	Games	PPG
1.	(United States) Andy Panko	Lagun Aro GBC	643	34	18.9
2.	(United States) Justin Doellman	Assignia Manresa	570	34	16.8
3.	(Bosnia and Herzegovina) Mirza Teletović	Caja Laboral	555	34	16.3
4.	(United States) Paul Davis	Banca Cívica	423	29	14.6
5.	(United States) Bracey Wright	CAI Zaragoza	480	33	14.5

=== Rebounds ===
Rank	Name	Team	Rebounds	Games	RPG
1.	(United States) James Augustine	UCAM Murcia	283	34	8.32
2.	(Bulgaria) Kaloyan Ivanov	Lucentum Alicante	255	33	7.73
3.	(United Kingdom) Joel Freeland	Unicaja	231	31	7.45
4.	(United States) Paul Davis	Banca Cívica	215	29	7.41
5.	(United States) Latavious Williams	FIATC Mutua Joventut	241	34	7.09

=== Assists ===
Rank	Name	Team	Assists	Games	APG
1.	(Spain) Javi Rodríguez	Assignia Manresa	181	29	6.24
2.	(Spain) Javi Salgado	Lagun Aro GBC	148	34	4.35
3.	(Spain) Sergio Llull	Real Madrid	143	34	4.21
4.	(Puerto Rico) Andrés Rodríguez	Blu:sens Monbús	130	33	3.94
5.	(Spain) Sergio Rodríguez	Real Madrid	130	34	3.82

== Awards ==
=== Regular season MVP ===
- Andrew Panko – Lagun Aro GBC

=== All-ACB team ===
Position	Player	Team
PG	(Spain) Sergio Llull	Real Madrid
SG	(Spain) Sergi Vidal	Lagun Aro GBC
SF	(United States) Andrew Panko	Lagun Aro GBC
PF	(Bosnia and Herzegovina) Mirza Teletović	Caja Laboral
C	(Slovenia) Erazem Lorbek	FC Barcelona Regal

=== ACB Rising Star Award ===
- Micah Downs – Assignia Manresa

=== Best Coach ===
- Xavi Pascual – Regal FC Barcelona

=== MVP week by week ===
Date	Player	Team	PIR
1	(United States) Kyle Singler	Lucentum Alicante	32
2	(Senegal) Boniface N'Dong	FC Barcelona Regal	29
3	(Spain) Rudy Fernández	Real Madrid	35
4	(Spain) Juan Carlos Navarro	FC Barcelona Regal (2)	28
5	(United States) Paul Davis	Banca Cívica	36
6	(France) Nando de Colo	Valencia Basket	37
7	(France) Hervé Touré (Brazil) Rafael Hettsheimeir	Blancos de Rueda Valladolid; CAI Zaragoza	32
8	(Bulgaria) Kaloyan Ivanov	Lucentum Alicante (2)	33
9	(Mexico) Gustavo Ayón	Mad-Croc Fuenlabrada	43
10	(Bulgaria) Kaloyan Ivanov (2)	Lucentum Alicante (3)	34
11	(Bulgaria) Kaloyan Ivanov (3)	Lucentum Alicante (4)	42
12	(United States) Marquez Haynes	Gran Canaria 2014	32
13	(United States) Bracey Wright	CAI Zaragoza (2)	40
14	(United States) Justin Doellman	Assignia Manresa	41
15	(United States) Andy Panko	Lagun Aro GBC	32
16	(United States) Josh Asselin (United States) Paul Davis (2)	Assignia Manresa (2); Banca Cívica (2)	34
17	(United States) D'or Fischer	Gescrap Bizkaia	38
18	(Gabon) Stéphane Lasme	Blu:sens Monbús	37
19	(United States) D'or Fischer (2)	Gescrap Bizkaia (2)	33
20	(Bosnia and Herzegovina) Mirza Teletović	Caja Laboral	32
21	(United States) James Augustine	UCAM Murcia	30
22	(Spain) Sergi Vidal	Lagun Aro GBC (2)	30
23	(Spain) Sergio Llull	Real Madrid (2)	27
24	(Croatia) Marko Banić	Gescrap Bizkaia (3)	29
25	(United States) Jaycee Carroll	Real Madrid (3)	39
26	(United States) Aaron Jackson (Slovenia) Erazem Lorbek	Gescrap Bizkaia (4); FC Barcelona Regal (3)	28
27	(United States) Curtis Borchardt	Blancos de Rueda Valladolid (2)	27
28	(Croatia) Luka Žorić	Unicaja	33
29	(Spain) Sergio Llull (2)	Real Madrid (4)	31
30	(Senegal) Boniface N'Dong (2)	FC Barcelona Regal (4)	31
31	(Spain) Juan Carlos Navarro (2)	FC Barcelona Regal (5)	42
32	(United States) Andy Panko (2)	Lagun Aro GBC (3)	28
33	(United States) James Augustine (2)	UCAM Murcia (2)	35
34	(United States) Spencer Nelson (Spain) Germán Gabriel	Gran Canaria 2014 (2); Asefa Estudiantes	29

=== Player of the month ===
Month	Week	Player	Team	PIR	Source
October	1–5	(United Kingdom) Joel Freeland	Unicaja	26.3	
November	6–9	(Mexico) Gustavo Ayón	Baloncesto Fuenlabrada	24.25	Archived 30 November 2011 at the Wayback Machine
December	10–13	(Bulgaria) Kaloyan Ivanov	Lucentum Alicante	26.5	Archived 9 January 2012 at the Wayback Machine
January	14–18	(United States) Justin Doellman	Assignia Manresa	25	Archived 3 May 2012 at the Wayback Machine
February	19–21	(Spain) Sergio Llull	Real Madrid	21.7	Archived 1 March 2012 at the Wayback Machine
March	22–26	(Spain) Sergi Vidal	Lagun Aro GBC	21	Archived 4 April 2012 at the Wayback Machine
April	27–32	(Senegal) Boniface N'Dong	FC Barcelona Regal	18.2	Archived 3 December 2013 at the Wayback Machine
April	33–34	(United States) James Augustine	UCAM Murcia	30.0	Archived 30 January 2014 at the Wayback Machine

Last updated: 28 February 2012.
Source: ACB

== Attendances ==
=== Overall, Regular season and Play-offs ===
Pos	Team	Total	High	Low	Average	Change
1	Asefa Estudiantes (17)	177,000	13,500	9,000	10,412	+6.6%
2	Caja Laboral (20)	204,043	15,504	7,600	10,202	+14.2%
3	Gescrap Bizkaia (18)	155,906	10,014	8,022	8,661	+10.1%
4	Real Madrid (23)	196,824	13,248	4,589	8,558	+32.5%
5	Unicaja (17)	143,950	11,000	4,300	8,468	−9.5%
6	Valencia Basket Club (21)	167,000	9,000	6,800	7,952	+6.3%
7	CAI Zaragoza (17)	125,370	9,400	6,000	7,375	−3.5%
8	Lagun Aro GBC (18)	126,670	10,105	4,875	7,037	+16.3%
9	Cajasol Banca Cívica (18)	98,300	7,400	4,200	5,461	+6.2%
10	UCAM Murcia CB (17)	91,041	6,972	4,800	5,355	n/a^{1}
11	Blusens Monbus (17)	89,100	5,900	4,600	5,241	n/a^{1}
12	Mad-Croc Fuenlabrada (17)	88,764	5,700	4,262	5,221	−3.8%
13	FIATC Mutua Joventut (17)	88,396	8,340	4,012	5,200	−8.9%
14	FC Barcelona Regal (23)	111,635	7,691	3,405	4,854	+0.3%
15	Gran Canaria 2014 (17)	78,560	5,197	3,835	4,621	−1.1%
16	Blancos de Rueda Valladolid (17)	77,979	6,529	3,100	4,587	−8.0%
17	Lucentum Alicante (18)	81,555	5,234	3,960	4,531	+7.9%
18	Assignia Manresa (17)	75,200	5,000	3,800	4,424	+5.1%
	League total	2,177,293	15,504	3,100	6,618	+5.3%

Source: ACB
Notes:
1: Team played previous season in Liga LEB.

=== Home matches played ===
Team \ Match played	Regular season (306 matches)																	Play-offs (23 matches)						Total
Team \ Match played	1	2	3	4	5	6	7	8	9	10	11	12	13	14	15	16	17	1	2	3	4	5	6	Total
Caja Laboral	7,600	8,442	7,822	7,823	7,718	8,416	8,050	8,074	9,423	9,423	8,734	9,380	9,100	15,504	11,200	10,512	13,826	14,162	13,615	15,219	—	—	—	204,043 (20)
Real Madrid	9,314	8,512	10,184	8,592	10,997	6,138	12,888	8,192	8,138	8,157	5,734	6,829	6,429	6,807	7,231	5,769	4,589	7,129	7,467	8,262	13,109	13,109	13,248	196,824 (23)
Asefa Estudiantes	11,000	9,000	9,000	10,500	10,000	12,500	9,500	9,500	10,000	12,000	9,500	9,000	11,000	9,000	12,000	10,000	13,500	—	—	—	—	—	—	177,000 (17)
Valencia Basket Club	7,700	7,500	8,000	9,000	7,500	8,000	7,500	8,000	7,800	7,500	8,000	8,500	7,900	7,500	8,200	7,200	6,800	8,200	8,800	9,000	8,400	—	—	167,000 (21)
Gescrap Bizkaia	8,311	8,022	8,093	8,398	8,179	8,302	10,014	10,014	8,432	8,202	10,014	8,523	8,516	8,392	8,932	8,093	8,039	9,430	—	—	—	—	—	155,906 (18)
Unicaja	9,500	8,900	9,500	11,000	9,400	8,500	9,000	8,150	7,900	8,800	6,500	7,900	8,100	7,500	10,500	4,300	8,500	—	—	—	—	—	—	143,950 (17)
Lagun Aro GBC	5,670	4,875	5,210	5,820	6,405	5,830	6,605	8,130	7,050	6,115	7,365	8,110	8,890	6,410	8,085	10,105	8,650	7,345	—	—	—	—	—	126,670 (18)
CAI Zaragoza	6,450	6,400	7,000	6,900	9,320	8,200	8,500	7,500	7,000	6,900	7,200	8,000	8,000	6,500	9,400	6,100	6,000	—	—	—	—	—	—	125,370 (17)
FC Barcelona Regal	5,126	5,274	5,087	4,359	4,380	4,599	4,957	4,079	4,894	3,577	4,519	3,544	3,405	4,277	5,136	4,326	6,577	3,886	4,485	3,929	6,377	7,151	7,691	111,635 (23)
Cajasol Banca Cívica	4,600	6,800	5,100	6,100	5,300	4,700	6,900	4,700	5,300	5,350	7,400	4,200	5,150	5,200	5,800	5,100	4,400	6,200	—	—	—	—	—	98,300 (18)
UCAM Murcia CB	4,800	5,100	5,025	5,045	5,064	5,125	5,638	6,008	5,024	5,130	4,900	5,052	5,300	5,225	5,434	6,199	6,972	—	—	—	—	—	—	91,041 (17)
Blusens Monbus	5,500	5,000	5,000	5,100	5,200	5,500	5,000	5,000	5,500	4,600	5,000	5,200	5,300	5,100	5,400	5,900	5,800	—	—	—	—	—	—	89,100 (17)
Mad-Croc Fuenlabrada	4,832	5,341	5,544	5,020	5,614	5,124	5,444	5,091	5,700	5,700	5,319	5,241	5,066	5,603	4,262	5,066	4,797	—	—	—	—	—	—	88,764 (17)
FIATC Mutua Joventut	5,709	4,886	4,946	5,245	4,414	4,408	8,002	5,970	4,890	4,840	8,340	4,942	4,236	4,619	4,908	4,029	4,012	—	—	—	—	—	—	88,396 (17)
Lucentum Alicante	4,210	4,570	4,325	4,702	4,869	4,374	4,440	5,234	4,385	4,105	4,645	4,275	4,565	4,736	4,355	4,910	4,895	3,960	—	—	—	—	—	81,555 (18)
Gran Canaria 2014	4,328	4,277	5,127	4,237	4,432	4,117	4,912	3,835	4,515	4,890	4,697	4,720	4,822	4,920	4,867	4,667	5,197	—	—	—	—	—	—	78,560 (17)
Blancos de Rueda Valladolid	3,200	4,900	5,000	4,300	5,100	4,000	5,200	5,100	4,900	6,529	4,900	5,950	4,700	4,500	3,400	3,100	3,200	—	—	—	—	—	—	77,979 (17)
Assignia Manresa	3,800	4,100	4,400	4,100	4,700	4,600	4,300	4,700	4,700	5,000	3,950	4,500	4,800	4,500	4,200	4,050	4,800	—	—	—	—	—	—	75,200 (17)
League total (329 matches)																								2,177,293

Source: ACB
