= ACB Best Coach =

Annual award for coaches in the Spanish basketball league

The ACB Best Coach is the annual award that is given to the best coach of each regular season phase of the Liga ACB, which is the top-tier level professional club basketball league in the country of Spain. The award began with the Liga ACB 2007–08 season. The Spanish Basketball Coaches Association, also gives a coach of the year award, the AEEB Coach of the Year Award, which has been awarded since the 1974–75 season.

== Liga ACB Best Coach award winners ==
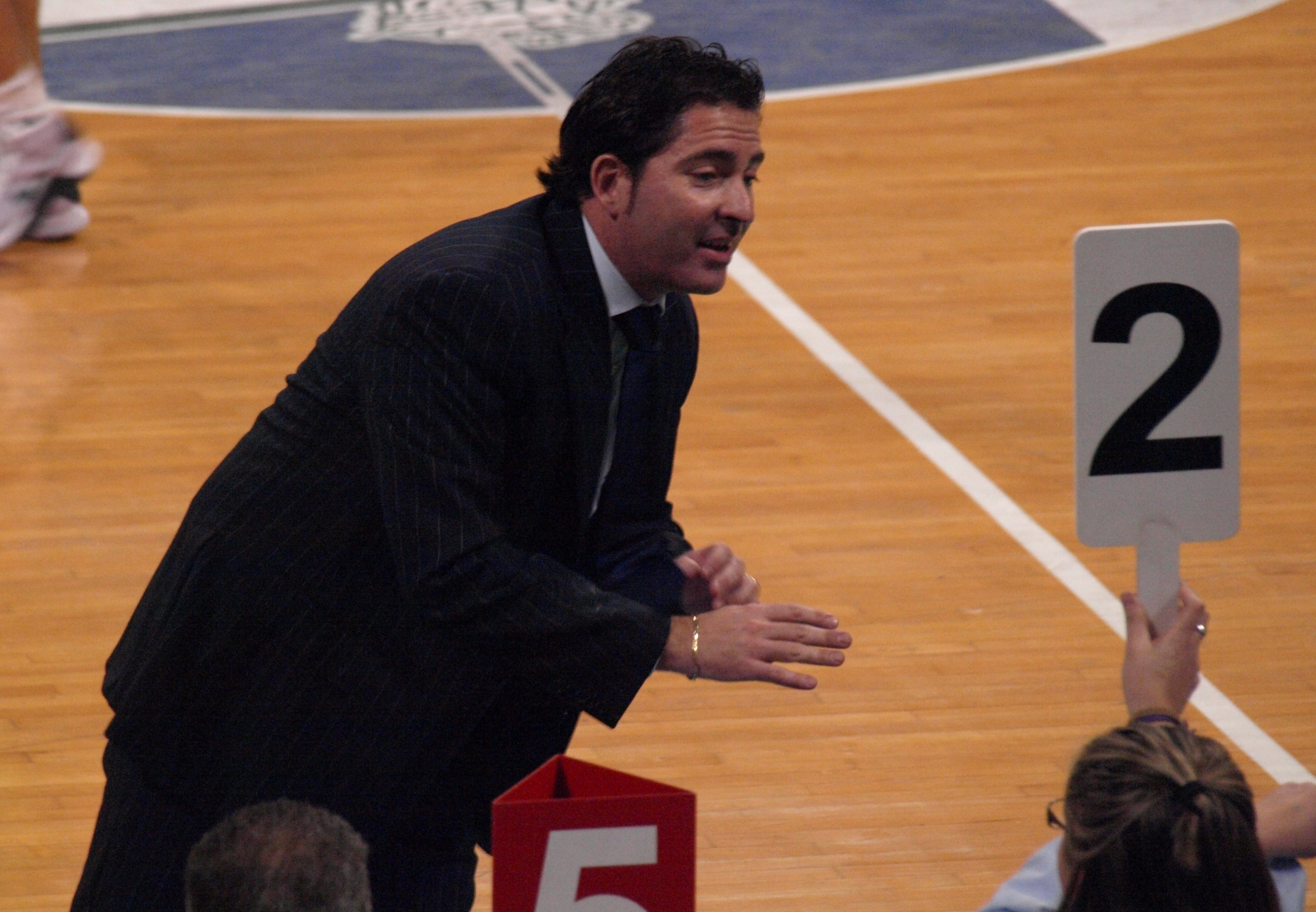
Xavi Pascual is a 4 time Liga ACB Best Coach (2010, 2011, 2012, 2016).

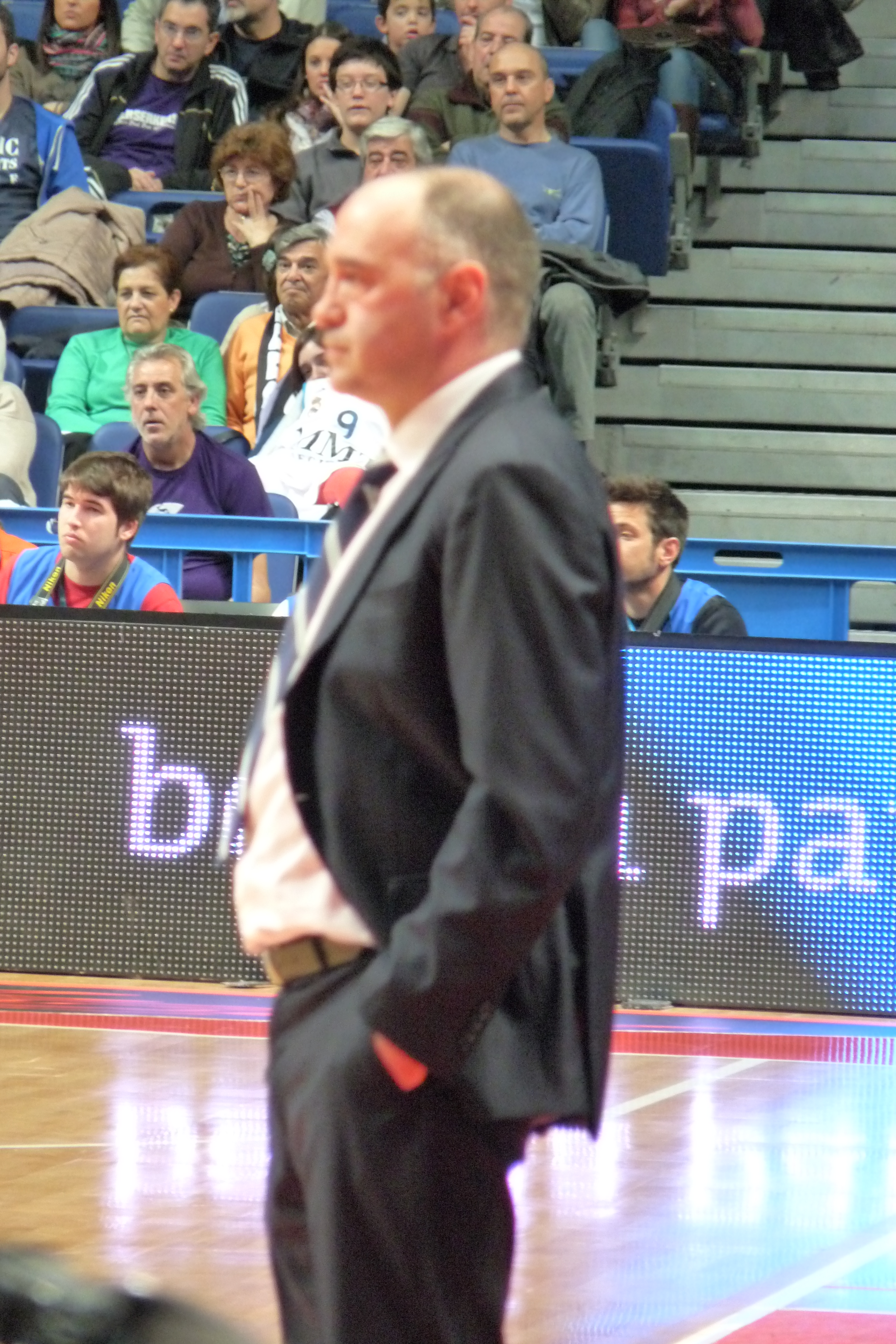
Pablo Laso is a 4 time Liga ACB Best Coach (2013, 2014, 2015, 2018).

| Season | Best Coach | Team | Record | Ref. |
|---|---|---|---|---|
| 2007–08 | (Spain) Joan Plaza | Real Madrid | 29–5 | |
| 2008–09 | (Montenegro) Duško Ivanović | Baskonia | 28–4 | |
| 2009–10 | (Spain) Xavi Pascual | Barcelona | 31–3 | |
| 2010–11 | (Spain) Xavi Pascual (2×) | Barcelona | 27–7 | |
| 2011–12 | (Spain) Xavi Pascual (3×) | Barcelona | 29–5 | |
| 2012–13 | (Spain) Pablo Laso | Real Madrid | 30–4 | |
| 2013–14 | (Spain) Pablo Laso (2×) | Real Madrid | 32–2 | |
| 2014–15 | (Spain) Pablo Laso (3×) | Real Madrid | 27–7 | |
| 2015–16 | (Spain) Xavi Pascual (4×) | Barcelona | 29–5 | |
| 2016–17 | (Spain) Txus Vidorreta | CB Canarias | 22–10 | |
| 2017–18 | (Spain) Pablo Laso (4×) | Real Madrid | 30–4 | |
| 2018–19 | (Serbia) Svetislav Pešić | Barcelona | 27–7 | |
| 2020–21 | (Spain) Pablo Laso (5×) | Real Madrid | 34–2 | |
| 2021–22 | (Lithuania) Šarūnas Jasikevičius | Barcelona | 27–7 | |
| 2022–23 | (Lithuania) Šarūnas Jasikevičius (2x) | Barcelona | 28–5 | |
| 2023–24 | (Spain) Sito Alonso | UCAM Murcia | 21–13 | |

== See also ==
- AEEB Coach of the Year Award
