= Xavi Pascual (basketball) =

Catalan professional basketball coach

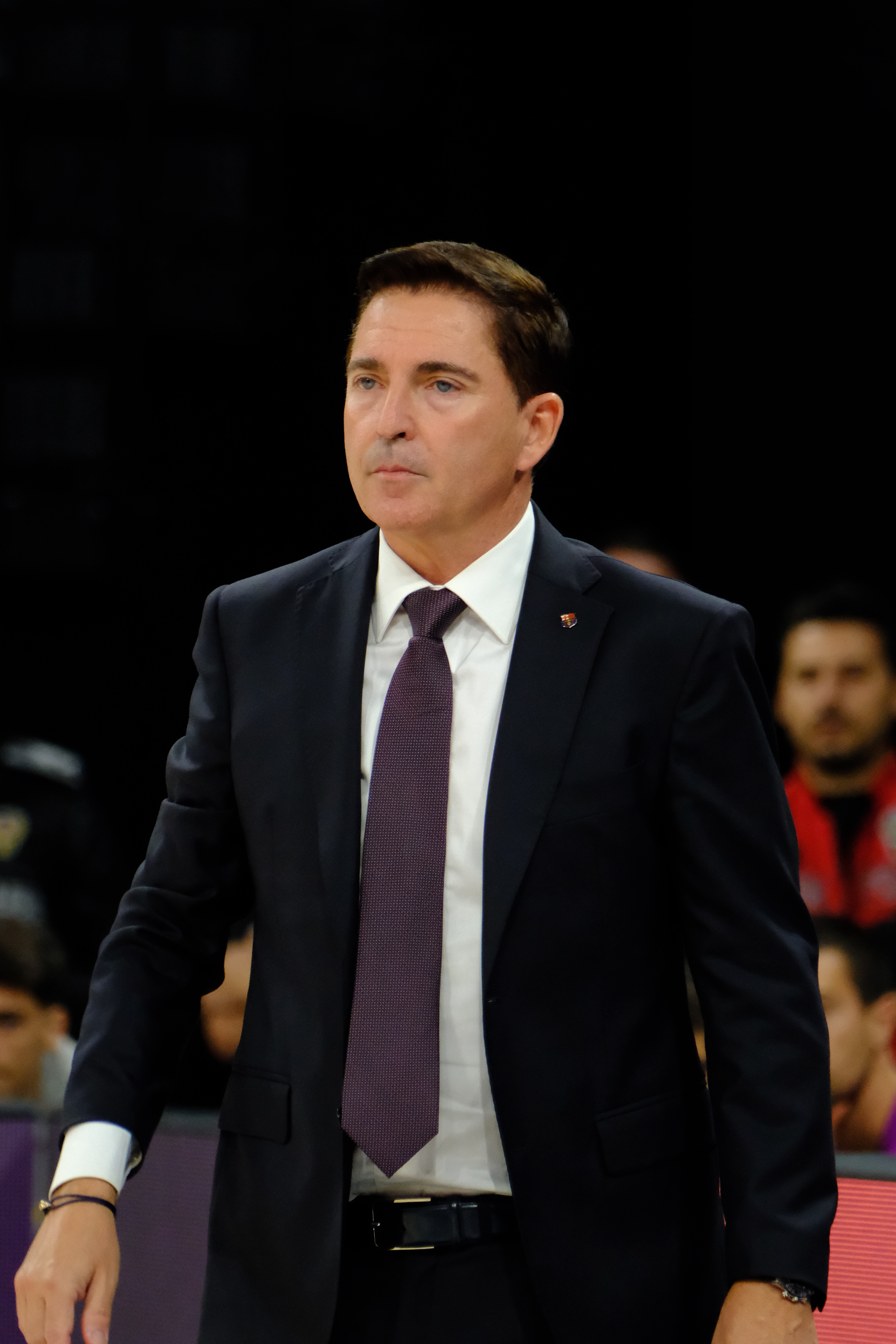
- Pascual in 2025

Dubai Basketball
- Position: Head coach
- League: ABA League; EuroLeague

Personal information
- Born: 9 September 1972 (age 54) Gavà, Spain
- Coaching career: 1990–present

Career history

Coaching
- 1990–1991: CB Gavà
- 1995–1997: Cornellà (assistant)
- 1997–1999: CB Santfeliuenc
- 1999–2001: CB Olesa
- 2001–2004: CB Aracena
- 2004–2005: FC Barcelona B
- 2005–2008: FC Barcelona (assistant)
- 2008–2016: FC Barcelona
- 2016–2018: Panathinaikos
- 2020–2025: Zenit Saint Petersburg
- 2025–2026: FC Barcelona
- 2026–present: Dubai Basketball

Career highlights
- As head coach: EuroLeague champion (2010); 4× Liga ACB champion (2009, 2011, 2012, 2014); 2× Greek League champion (2017, 2018); VTB United League champion (2022); 3× Spanish Cup winner (2010, 2011, 2013); Greek Cup winner (2017); Russian Cup winner (2024); 4× Spanish Supercup winner (2009–2011, 2015); 2× VTB United League Supercup winner (2022, 2023); 7× Catalan League champion (2009–2015); EuroLeague Coach of the Year (2010); 3× AEEB Spanish Coach of the Year (2009–2011); 4× Liga ACB Coach of the Year (2010–2012, 2016); 2× Greek League Coach of the Year (2017, 2018); VTB United League Coach of the Year (2021)

Xavier Pascual i Vives, commonly known as Xavi Pascual (born 9 September 1972), is a Spanish professional basketball coach who is currently the head coach of Dubai Basketball of the ABA League and EuroLeague. On 9 May 2010 he became the youngest head coach to win the EuroLeague championship (only counting the Euroleague Basketball Company era, since the year 2000), and soon after, he also won the EuroLeague Coach of the Year Award.

== Coaching career ==
=== Early years ===
The first team Pascual coached was Gavà (1990–91). Other teams that he coached early in his career were: Cornellà, Santfeliuenc, Olesa, and Aracena.

=== FC Barcelona ===
In the 2004–05 season, Pascual moved to FC Barcelona, where he became the head coach of FC Barcelona Bàsquet B, the club's Liga EBA (Spanish 4th Division) reserve team.

In the 2005–06 season, he became assistant coach of the senior team of FC Barcelona, in the Liga ACB. After the team and then head coach Duško Ivanović parted ways in 2008, Pascual became the club's head coach. In his second season as head coach, Barcelona won the Spanish Championship, with Pascual becoming the youngest coach to ever do so. The following season, Pascual led Barcelona to victory in the 2009–10 EuroLeague. It was the club's second trophy in the competition.

On 21 September 2012, Pascual extended his contract with Barcelona, until the end of 2014–15 season. On 3 February 2015, he extended his contract with Barcelona, until the end of the 2016–17 season.

After the 2015–16 season, in which Barcelona failed to win the ACB Finals and was eliminated in the EuroLeague's quarterfinal playoffs, Pascual was fired. In total, Pascual won 19 trophies in his first tenure as FC Barcelona coach, including a EuroLeague and 4 Liga ACB championships.

=== Panathinaikos ===
On 22 October 2016, Pascual signed a three-year contract to be the head coach of the Greek Basket League team Panathinaikos. In domestic competition, Pascual led the Greens to back-to-back Greek League titles, in 2017 and 2018, and was named the league's best coach for both seasons. On 20 December 2018 Panathinaikos dismissed Pascual after he had spent two seasons with the club, bringing the Greens to the Turkish Airlines EuroLeague Playoffs in both, but failing to bring them back to the Final Four.

=== Zenit Saint Petersburg ===
In February 2020, Pascual took over as the head coach of Zenit Saint Peterburg of the VTB United League and the EuroLeague. Replacing fellow Catalan Joan Plaza on the job, he initially signed until the end of the season. After turning around the team's negative record in the 2020-21 EuroLeague and managing to qualify for the Euroleague Playoffs for the first time in club history, Pascual signed a contract extension for two more seasons in April 2021. The following season, Pascual led Zenit to its first major title, the 2021-22 VTB United League. Pascual extended his contract with Zenit twice in the following seasons, finding success winning two consecutive Supercups (2022 and 2023) and a Russian Cup (2024). His tenure at Zenit finally ended in June 2025, after five seasons and four trophies won with the Russians.

=== Return to FC Barcelona ===
After the dismissal of Joan Peñarroya during the 2025–26 season, Pascual was announced as the new FC Barcelona coach on 13 November 2025, returning 9 years after his previous stint. On 17 October 2025, he signed his new contract in the presence of club president Joan Laporta. The contract tied Pascual to the Catalans until 2028. In April 2026, Pascual became Barcelona's second coach to ever reach 300 victories in the Liga ACB after Aíto García Reneses. At the time of reaching this milestone, Pascual was the coach with the best overall win percentage to ever do so in the competition. After announcing his departure before the end of the season, Pascual activated his contract's release clause on July 14, 2026.

=== Dubai Basketball ===
On July 14, 2026, Pascual was announced as the new head coach of Dubai Basketball of the ABA League and EuroLeague.

== Coaching record ==
Legend
G	Games coached	W	Games won	L	Games lost	W–L %	Win-loss %

Note: The EuroLeague is not the only competition in which the team played during the season. He also coached in domestic competition, and regional competition if applicable.

=== EuroLeague ===
Team	Year	G	W	L	W–L%	Result
FC Barcelona	2007–08	9	4	5	.444	Eliminated in Quarterfinal Playoffs
FC Barcelona	2008–09	23	18	5	.783	Won in 3rd place game
FC Barcelona	2009–10	22	20	2	.909	Won EuroLeague Championship
FC Barcelona	2010–11	20	14	6	.700	Eliminated in Quarterfinal Playoffs
FC Barcelona	2011–12	21	19	2	.905	Won in 3rd place game
FC Barcelona	2012–13	31	25	6	.806	Lost in 3rd place game
FC Barcelona	2013–14	29	23	6	.793	Won in 3rd place game
FC Barcelona	2014–15	28	21	7	.750	Eliminated in Quarterfinal Playoffs
FC Barcelona	2015–16	29	16	13	.552	Eliminated in Quarterfinal Playoffs
Panathinaikos	2016–17	30	19	11	.633	Eliminated in Quarterfinal Playoffs
Panathinaikos	2017–18	34	20	14	.588	Eliminated in Quarterfinal Playoffs
Panathinaikos	2018–19	13	6	7	.462	Fired
Zenit Saint Petersburg	2020–21	39	22	17	.564	Eliminated in Quarterfinal Playoffs
FC Barcelona	2025–26	29	15	14	.517	Eliminated in Play-in
Career		359	244	115	.680	

== Honours ==
=== CB Aracena ===
- LEB 2 (Spanish 3rd Division) (1): 2002–03
- Lliga Catalana LEB (Catalan 2nd Division) (1): 2003–04

=== FC Barcelona ===
- Liga ACB (Spanish League) (4): 2008–09, 2010–11, 2011–12, 2013–14
- Spanish Cup (3): 2009–10, 2010–11, 2012–13
- EuroLeague (1): 2009–10
- Spanish Supercup (4): 2009, 2010, 2011, 2015
- Lliga Catalana (Catalan League) (7): 2009, 2010, 2011, 2012, 2013, 2014, 2015

=== Panathinaikos ===
- Greek League (2): 2016–17, 2017–18
- Greek Cup (1): 2016–17

=== Zenit Saint Petersburg ===
- VTB United League (Russian League) (1): 2021–22
- Russian Cup (1): 2024
- Russian Supercup (2): 2022, 2023

=== Individual ===
- 4× Spanish League Coach of the Year: 2009–10, 2010–11, 2011–12, 2015–16
- 3× AEEB Spanish Coach of the Year: 2009, 2010, 2011
- EuroLeague Coach of the Year: 2009–10
- 2× Greek League Best Coach: 2016–17, 2017–18

== Personal life ==
Born in Gavà, Catalonia, Pascual has a bachelor's degree in industrial engineering and worked as an engineer for the city council of Viladecans before focusing on his coaching career.

== See also ==
- List of EuroLeague-winning head coaches

Sporting positions
Preceded by Željko Obradović	EuroLeague; Winning Coach; 2010	Succeeded by Željko Obradović
