= 2013–14 ACB season =

2013–14 Liga Endesa^{1}
- Season: 2013–14
- Duration: 12 October 2013 – 25 May 2014
- Games played: 329
- Teams: 18

Regular season
- Top seed: Real Madrid
- Season MVP: (United States) Justin Doellman
- Relegated: La Bruixa d'Or; CB Valladolid

Finals
- Champions: FC Barcelona (18th title)
- Runners-up: Real Madrid
- Semi-finalists: Valencia Basket; Unicaja Málaga
- Finals MVP: (Spain) Juan Carlos Navarro

Awards
- Best Young Player: (Spain) Guillem Vives

Statistical leaders
Points	(United States) Andy Panko	17.9
Rebounds	(Brazil) Augusto César Lima	7.1
Assists	(Spain) Sergio Rodríguez	6.1
Index Rating	(United States) Justin Doellman	18.0

Records
- Biggest home win: FCB 109–50 CBV
- Biggest away win: CBV 66–111 FCB
- Highest scoring: EST 104–103 BXA
- Winning streak: 28 (Real Madrid)
- Losing streak: 12 (CB Valladolid, La Bruixa d'Or)
- Highest attendance: 14,623; LBO 74–90 RMB
- Lowest attendance: 1,500; CBV 68–96 CAI
- Average attendance: 6,202
- ^{1} Sponsored league name, referring to Endesa.

The 2013–14 ACB season is the 31st season of the Spanish basketball league Liga ACB, also called Liga Endesa in its sponsored identity. The regular season began on October 12, 2013, and ended on May 25, 2014. The playoffs began on May 29, 2014 and ended on June 26, 2014.

FC Barcelona won their 18th league title.

== Teams, venues and locations ==
- Relegated to LEB Oro
  - ~~Lagun Aro GBC~~ (17th)
  - ~~La Bruixa d'Or~~ (18th)
- Promoted from LEB Oro
  - ~~Ford Burgos~~ (Champion)
  - ~~Lucentum Alicante~~ (2nd)

Lagun Aro GBC and La Bruixa d'Or remained in Liga ACB after Ford Burgos and Lucentum Alicante failed to meet requirements for joining the league.

Location of teams in 2013–14 ACB
2013–14 ACB season (Canary Islands)

Team	Home city	Stadium	Capacity	Last season	Head coach	Season
Baloncesto Fuenlabrada	Fuenlabrada	Fernando Martin	5,700	14th	(Spain) Luis Casimiro	5th (1st)
Bilbao Basket	Bilbao	Bilbao Arena	10,014	7th	(Spain) Rafa Pueyo	1st
CAI Zaragoza	Zaragoza	Príncipe Felipe Arena	10,744	3rd	(Spain) José Luis Abós	5th
Cajasol	Sevilla	Palacio San Pablo	10,200	15th	(Spain) Aíto García Reneses	2nd
CB Valladolid	Valladolid	Polideportivo Pisuerga	6,800	16th	(Spain) Ricard Casas	1st
FC Barcelona	Barcelona	Palau Blaugrana	8,250	2nd	(Spain) Xavi Pascual	7th
FIATC Joventut	Badalona	Palau Municipal d'Esports	12,760	11th	(Spain) Salva Maldonado	3rd
Gipuzkoa Basket	San Sebastián	San Sebastián Arena	10,241	17th	(Spain) Sito Alonso	3rd
Herbalife Gran Canaria	Las Palmas de Gran Canaria	Centro Insular de Deportes; Gran Canaria Arena	5,200; 11,500	4th	(Spain) Pedro Martínez	8th (5th)
Iberostar Tenerife	San Cristóbal de La Laguna	Pabellón Insular Santiago Martín	5,003	10th	(Spain) Alejandro Martínez	10th
La Bruixa d'Or	Manresa	Nou Congost	5,000	18th	(Spain) Pere Romero	1st
Laboral Kutxa	Vitoria-Gasteiz	Fernando Buesa Arena	15,504	5th	(Italy) Sergio Scariolo	3rd (1st)
Real Madrid	Madrid	Palacio de los Deportes	13,500	1st	(Spain) Pablo Laso	3rd
Río Natura Monbús	Santiago de Compostela	Multiusos Fontes do Sar	5,824	8th	(Spain) Moncho Fernández	4th
Tuenti Móvil Estudiantes	Madrid	Palacio de los Deportes	13,500	12th	(Spain) Txus Vidorreta	2nd
UCAM Murcia	Murcia	Palacio de Deportes de Murcia	7,454	13th	(Argentina) Marcelo Nicola	1st
Unicaja	Málaga	Martín Carpena	10,500	9th	(Spain) Joan Plaza	1st
Valencia BC	Valencia	Fuente San Luis	9,000	6th	(Croatia) Velimir Perasović	3rd

== Managerial changes ==
=== Before the start of the season ===
Team	Outgoing manager	Manner of departure	Date of vacancy	Replaced by	Date of appointment
La Bruixa d'Or	(Spain) Jaume Ponsarnau	End of contract	19 May 2013	(Spain) Borja Comenge	4 July 2013
Unicaja	(Croatia) Jasmin Repeša	Sacked	21 May 2013	(Spain) Joan Plaza	6 June 2013
Laboral Kutxa	(Croatia) Žan Tabak	Sacked	3 June 2013	(Italy) Sergio Scariolo	12 June 2013
Bilbao Basket	(Greece) Fotios Katsikaris	End of contract	6 June 2013	(Spain) Rafa Pueyo	7 June 2013
CB Valladolid	(Spain) Roberto González	Resigned	26 June 2013	(Spain) Ricard Casas	16 September 2013

=== During the season ===
Team	Outgoing manager	Manner of departure	Date of vacancy	Replaced by	Date of appointment	Position in table
UCAM Murcia	(Spain) Óscar Quintana	Sacked	20 January 2014	(Argentina) Marcelo Nicola	20 January 2014	15th (5–11)
Baloncesto Fuenlabrada	(Spain) Chus Mateo	Sacked	3 March 2014	(Spain) Luis Casimiro	4 March 2014	14th (7–14)
La Bruixa d'Or	(Spain) Borja Comenge	Sacked	7 April 2014	(Spain) Pere Romero	8 April 2014	17th (7–19)

== Regular season ==
=== League table ===
Pos	Team	Pld	W	L	PF	PA	PD	Qualification or relegation
1	Real Madrid	34	32	2	3001	2480	+521	Qualification for playoffs
2	Valencia Basket	34	30	4	2930	2554	+376	Qualification for playoffs
3	FC Barcelona	34	27	7	2785	2382	+403	Qualification for playoffs
4	Unicaja	34	23	11	2745	2467	+278	Qualification for playoffs
5	Herbalife Gran Canaria	34	22	12	2595	2430	+165	Qualification for playoffs
6	Laboral Kutxa	34	19	15	2777	2702	+75	Qualification for playoffs
7	Cajasol	34	18	16	2543	2545	−2	Qualification for playoffs
8	CAI Zaragoza	34	18	16	2647	2591	+56	Qualification for playoffs
9	FIATC Joventut	34	16	18	2655	2658	−3	
10	Gipuzkoa	34	16	18	2417	2443	−26	
11	Iberostar Tenerife	34	14	20	2644	2739	−95	
12	Río Natura Monbús	34	13	21	2548	2624	−76	
13	UCAM Murcia	34	12	22	2661	2866	−205	
14	Bilbao Basket	34	12	22	2692	2751	−59	
15	Fuenlabrada	34	12	22	2580	2768	−188	
16	Tuenti Móvil Estudiantes	34	12	22	2569	2682	−113	
17	La Bruixa d'Or	34	7	27	2464	2888	−424	Relegation to LEB Oro
18	CB Valladolid	34	3	31	2392	3075	−683	Relegation to LEB Oro

=== Results ===
	FUE	BIL	CAI	CAJ	CBV	FCB	CJB	GBC	GCA	ITF	MAN	LBO	RMB	OBR	EST	UCM	UNI	VBC
Baloncesto Fuenlabrada		75–72	72–81	75–84	91–81	73–77	76–69	81–67	78–83	84–68	81–73	74–73	67–94	73–78	82–72	87–84	71–81	76–90
Bilbao Basket	95–73		77–86	79–82	93–77	80–72	83–90	78–68	72–83	93–90	92–64	96–92	73–87	92–94	72–55	82–69	68–75	80–83
CAI Zaragoza	77–68	88–72		66–74	95–79	85–79	87–73	67–92	77–84	60–66	89–52	75–88	68–75	85–58	80–65	103–67	81–91	95–89
Cajasol	74–60	72–75	79–59		84–68	57–62	83–81	80–59	73–60	81–67	78–60	82–62	62–97	80–71	71–82	73–93	65–85	77–95
CB Valladolid	83–107	57–81	68–96	81–68		66–111	72–79	64–83	64–92	91–103	88–76	58–87	83–105	77–73	59–89	70–75	65–106	77–91
FC Barcelona	81–63	104–75	73–50	88–70	109–50		88–79	81–74	62–52	87–71	91–63	91–75	86–75	77–62	73–56	96–63	77–84	76–75
FIATC Mutua Joventut	76–79	80–70	82–57	65–74	95–73	80–83		76–65	78–84	76–63	93–72	83–74	68–72	70–63	76–89	85–89	63–65	78–73
Gipuzkoa Basket	77–58	83–71	73–62	76–71	82–67	75–86	62–64		57–79	70–66	73–65	76–78	65–76	63–67	79–71	85–80	69–61	50–57
Herbalife Gran Canaria	96–75	77–70	58–55	58–68	89–60	74–82	89–82	63–56		79–61	70–85	84–81	70–75	53–60	76–62	86–69	67–65	81–86
Iberostar Tenerife	90–82	96–85	75–78	75–59	84–68	56–78	95–103	76–75	72–68		78–83	78–82	74–85	76–74	94–96	82–69	60–71	91–100
La Bruixa d'Or	84–83	66–88	71–74	72–97	75–72	71–81	90–78	74–82	65–95	71–75		64–69	69–92	56–77	74–81	84–74	78–99	64–76
Laboral Kutxa	95–77	76–70	92–83	101–65	84–67	76–72	100–71	66–72	96–99	83–95	101–78		74–90	83–72	79–66	98–90	82–75	78–79
Real Madrid	96–81	92–75	92–79	81–75	87–53	98–84	106–88	81–72	83–74	87–76	111–63	105–72		82–59	72–57	102–65	88–67	100–105
Río Natura Monbús	75–76	89–81	82–86	56–70	84–83	77–60	89–72	72–76	77–83	84–76	71–88	92–94	68–83		85–97	95–86	79–61	70–102
Tuenti Móvil Estudiantes	86–66	86–80	62–89	54–61	80–66	51–77	74–81	72–61	63–75	85–88	104–103	84–87	64–71	87–77		69–77	84–85	80–88
UCAM Murcia	93–73	78–77	90–82	89–85	101–90	72–84	76–82	67–85	71–78	72–87	90–79	89–80	81–88	47–83	85–84		76–78	76–85
Unicaja	88–81	109–74	67–76	89–76	112–58	69–74	58–60	81–55	76–66	88–73	91–75	83–64	83–86	80–71	97–78	81–72		71–74
Valencia Basket	75–62	83–71	96–76	104–93	108–57	95–93	85–69	87–58	74–70	92–67	92–59	67–55	75–82	69–64	96–84	88–86	91–83	

== Playoffs ==
Quarter Finals
1	Real Madrid	2
8	CAI Zaragoza	0
4	Unicaja	2
5	Herbalife Gran Canaria	1
2	Valencia BC	2
7	Cajasol	1
3	FC Barcelona	2
6	Laboral Kutxa	0

Semifinals
1	Real Madrid	3
4	Unicaja	1
2	Valencia BC	2
3	FC Barcelona	3

Finals
1	Real Madrid	1
3	FC Barcelona	3

== Final standings ==
Pos.	Team	GP	W	L	Qualification or relegation
1	FC Barcelona	45	35	10	Qualified to 2014–15 Euroleague
2	Real Madrid	44	38	6	Qualified to 2014–15 Euroleague
3	Valencia Basket	42	34	8	Qualified to 2014–15 Euroleague
4	Unicaja	41	26	15	Qualified to 2014–15 Euroleague
5	Herbalife Gran Canaria	37	23	14	Qualified to 2014–15 Eurocup
6	Laboral Kutxa	36	19	17	Qualified to 2014–15 Euroleague
7	Cajasol	37	19	18	Qualified to 2014–15 Eurocup
8	CAI Zaragoza	36	18	18	Qualified to 2014–15 Eurocup
9	FIATC Joventut	34	16	18	
10	Gipuzkoa Basket	34	16	18	
11	Iberostar Tenerife	34	14	20	
12	Río Natura Monbús	34	13	22	
13	UCAM Murcia	34	12	22	
14	Bilbao Basket	34	12	22	
15	Baloncesto Fuenlabrada	34	12	22	
16	Tuenti Móvil Estudiantes	34	12	22	
17	La Bruixa d'Or	34	7	27	Relegated to LEB Oro
18	CB Valladolid	34	3	31	Relegated to LEB Oro

Notes:

- Real Madrid, FC Barcelona, Baskonia and Unicaja are qualified to Euroleague thanks to their A licence. The worst qualified team of these four can have suspended its A license if other different team qualifies to the ACB Finals.
- There is an established limit of seven ACB teams between Euroleague and Eurocup Basketball, without counting possible wildcards.
- The invitational wildcard to the EuroChallenge is not confirmed.

== Stats Leaders ==
=== Performance Index Rating ===
Rank	Name	Team	Rating	Games	PIR
1.	(United States) Justin Doellman	Valencia Basket	577	32	18.0
2.	(Germany) Tibor Pleiß	Laboral Kutxa	561	32	17.5
3.	(United States) Andy Panko	Baloncesto Fuenlabrada	558	33	16.9
4.	(Spain) Rudy Fernández	Real Madrid	498	30	16.6
5.	(United States) Jason Robinson	Gipuzkoa Basket	538	33	16.3

=== Points ===
Rank	Name	Team	Points	Games	PPG
1.	(United States) Andy Panko	Baloncesto Fuenlabrada	591	33	17.9
2.	(United States) Jason Robinson	Gipuzkoa Basket	546	33	16.5
3.	(United States) Justin Doellman	Valencia Basket	481	32	15.0
4.	(Spain) Álex Mumbrú	Bilbao Basket	509	34	15.0
5.	(Argentina) Andrés Nocioni	Laboral Kutxa	443	30	14.8

=== Rebounds ===
Rank	Name	Team	Rebounds	Games	RPG
1.	(Brazil) Augusto César Lima	UCAM Murcia	212	30	7.07
2.	(United States) Luke Sikma	Iberostar Tenerife	237	34	6.97
3.	(Croatia) Ante Tomić	FC Barcelona	207	31	6.68
4.	(Germany) Tibor Pleiß	Laboral Kutxa	213	32	6.66
5.	(Cape Verde) Walter Tavares	Herbalife Gran Canaria	211	32	6.59

=== Assists ===
Rank	Name	Team	Assists	Games	APG
1.	(Spain) Sergio Rodríguez	Real Madrid	207	34	6.09
2.	(France) Thomas Heurtel	Laboral Kutxa	174	32	5.44
3.	(Spain) Javi Salgado	Gipuzkoa Basket	166	34	4.88
4.	(United States) Oliver Lafayette	Valencia Basket	156	32	4.88
5.	(Czech Republic) Tomáš Satoranský	Cajasol	158	34	4.65

== Attendances ==
Attendances include playoff games:

Pos	Team	Total	High	Low	Average	Change
1	Real Madrid	203,319	13,217	5,814	9,242	13.2%
2	Laboral Kutxa	165,412	14,182	6,824	9,190	-7.83%
3	Bilbao Basket	154,650	10,000	7,610	9,097	-4%
4	CAI Zaragoza	152,189	10,853	6,358	8,010	2.18%
5	Valencia BC	168,050	8,500	6,500	8,002	1.43%
6	Tuenti Móvil Estudiantes	134,752	13,800	2,600	7,927	-12.15%^{1}
7	Unicaja	126,333	10,600	3,394	6,317	2%
8	Lagun Aro GBC	101,960	8,890	3,780	5,998	-5.72%
9	UCAM Murcia	94,928	7,269	4,718	5,584	-1.38%
10	FIATC Joventut	92,638	10,500	3,156	5,449	4.19%
11	Herbalife Gran Canaria	92,644	9,332	4,106	5,147	10.47%^{2}
12	Blu:sens Monbús	85,841	6,000	4,438	5,049	-6.99%
13	FC Barcelona	100,455	7,539	3,471	4,909	0.74%
14	Baloncesto Fuenlabrada	82,621	5,546	4,024	4,860	-4.33%
15	Cajasol	74,830	7,260	2,400	4,157	4.32%
16	La Bruixa d'Or	64,361	4,900	2,100	4,023	-5.92%
17	Iberostar Tenerife	65,761	5,100	2,891	3,868	-6.95%
18	CB Valladolid	59,750	5,900	1,500	3,515	-28.18%
	League total	2,213,116	14,182	1,500	6,202	−2.1%

Updated to games played on 26 June 2014
Source: Liga ACB
Notes:
1: Tuenti Móvil Estudiantes played one game at Pabellón Jorge Garbajosa, in Torrejón de Ardoz.
2: Herbalife Gran Canaria played in Centro Insular de Deportes until the round 26 (14 games).

- Highest attendance:
  - 14,623 at Fernando Buesa Arena (Round 19, Laboral Kutxa 74–90 Real Madrid)
- Lowest attendance:
  - 1,500 at Pabellón Polideportivo Pisuerga (Round 32, CB Valladolid 68–96 CAI Zaragoza)

== Awards ==
=== Regular season MVP ===
- Justin Doellman – Valencia BC

=== All-ACB Team ===
Position	Player	Team
PG	(Spain) Sergio Rodríguez	Real Madrid
SG	(Spain) Rudy Fernández	Real Madrid
SF	(Central African Republic) Romain Sato	Valencia Basket
PF	(Spain) Nikola Mirotić	Real Madrid
C	(United States) Justin Doellman	Valencia Basket

=== Best Young Player Award ===
- Guillem Vives – FIATC Joventut

=== Best All-Young Team ===
Position	Player	Team
PG	(Spain) Guillem Vives	FIATC Joventut
SG	(Spain) Álex Abrines	FC Barcelona
SF	(Sweden) Marcus Eriksson	La Bruixa d'Or
PF	(Latvia) Kristaps Porziņģis	Cajasol
C	(Cape Verde) Walter Tavares	Herbalife Gran Canaria

=== Player of the week ===
Date	Player	Team	PIR
1	(Denmark) Rasmus Larsen	La Bruixa d'Or	37
2	(Spain) Álex Mumbrú (Germany) Tibor Pleiß	Bilbao Basket; Laboral Kutxa	32
3	(Montenegro) Blagota Sekulić	Iberostar Tenerife	41
4	(Spain) Guille Rubio	Estudiantes	28
5	(United States) Justin Doellman	Valencia BC	42
6	(Canada) Devoe Joseph	FIATC Joventut	31
7	(United States) Jason Rowe	CB Valladolid	29
8	(Germany) Tibor Pleiß (2)	Laboral Kutxa	41
9	(Germany) Tibor Pleiß (3)	Laboral Kutxa	29
10	(Bulgaria) Dejan Ivanov	Tuenti Móvil Estudiantes	32
11	(Spain) Saúl Blanco	Iberostar Tenerife	31
12	(Spain) Ricardo Úriz	Iberostar Tenerife	35
13	(United States) Justin Doellman (2)	Valencia BC	39
14	(Bulgaria) Dejan Ivanov (2)	Tuenti Móvil Estudiantes	28
15	(Spain) Nikola Mirotić	Real Madrid	34
16	(Germany) Tibor Pleiß (4)	Laboral Kutxa	33
17	(France) Kim Tillie	UCAM Murcia	34
18	(United States) Mike Muscala (United States) Andy Panko	Río Natura Monbús; Baloncesto Fuenlabrada	32
19	(United States) Andy Panko (2)	Baloncesto Fuenlabrada	29
20	(Spain) Pau Ribas	Valencia BC	34
21	(Spain) Alberto Corbacho	Río Natura Monbús	31
22	(United States) Jacob Pullen	FC Barcelona	41
23	(Dominican Republic) James Feldeine	Baloncesto Fuenlabrada	33
24	(United States) Jason Robinson	Gipuzkoa Basket	34
25	(Poland) Maciej Lampe	FC Barcelona	28
26	(Spain) Álex Mumbrú (2)	Bilbao Basket	33
27	(Spain) Sergio Rodríguez	Real Madrid	28
28	(United States) Justin Doellman (3)	Valencia BC	31
29	(United States) Luke Sikma	Iberostar Tenerife	39
30	(Spain) Rudy Fernández	Real Madrid	40
31	(United States) Oliver Lafayette	Valencia BC	28
32	(United States) Justin Doellman (4)	Valencia BC	31
33	(United States) Scott Bamforth	Cajasol	33
34	(Germany) Tibor Pleiß (5)	Laboral Kutxa	28

=== Player of the month ===
Month	Week	Player	Team	PIR	Source
October	1–3	(Montenegro) Blagota Sekulić	Iberostar Tenerife	27.7	Archived 2014-10-25 at the Wayback Machine
November	4–8	(United States) Justin Doellman	Valencia Basket	27.4	Archived 2014-10-25 at the Wayback Machine
December	9–13	(Montenegro) Blagota Sekulić	Iberostar Tenerife	21.0	Archived 2014-10-25 at the Wayback Machine
January	14–17	(United States) Andy Panko	Baloncesto Fuenlabrada	21.0	Archived 2014-10-25 at the Wayback Machine
February	18–20	(United States) Andy Panko	Baloncesto Fuenlabrada	27.3	Archived 2014-10-25 at the Wayback Machine
March	21–25	(Poland) Maciej Lampe	FC Barcelona	24.0	Archived 2014-04-11 at the Wayback Machine
April	26–29	(United States) Justin Doellman	Valencia Basket	21.0	Archived 2014-10-24 at the Wayback Machine
May	30–34	(United States) Luke Sikma	Iberostar Tenerife	22.2	Archived 2014-10-25 at the Wayback Machine

Last updated: 26 February 2014.
Source: ACB

== See also ==
- Supercopa de España de Baloncesto 2013
- Copa del Rey de Baloncesto 2013–14
- 2013–14 LEB Oro season
