= AEEB Coach of the Year Award =

Spanish baseball award

The AEEB Coach of the Year Award is an annual basketball award that is given by the Spanish Basketball Coaches Association (Spanish: Asociación Española de Entrenadores de Baloncesto (AEEB). It recognizes the best coach of the year in Spain.

The award was established in 1975, and the person recognized as the 'AEEB Coach of the Year' receives the AEEB Coach of the Year trophy, which is named after Antonio Díaz-Miguel. This award is considered the most important one for basketball coaches in Spain, since it is based on votes by other coaches. The top-tier level basketball league in Spain, the Liga ACB, also gives a coach of the year award, the ACB Best Coach award, which has been awarded since the 2007–08 season.

== Past winners ==
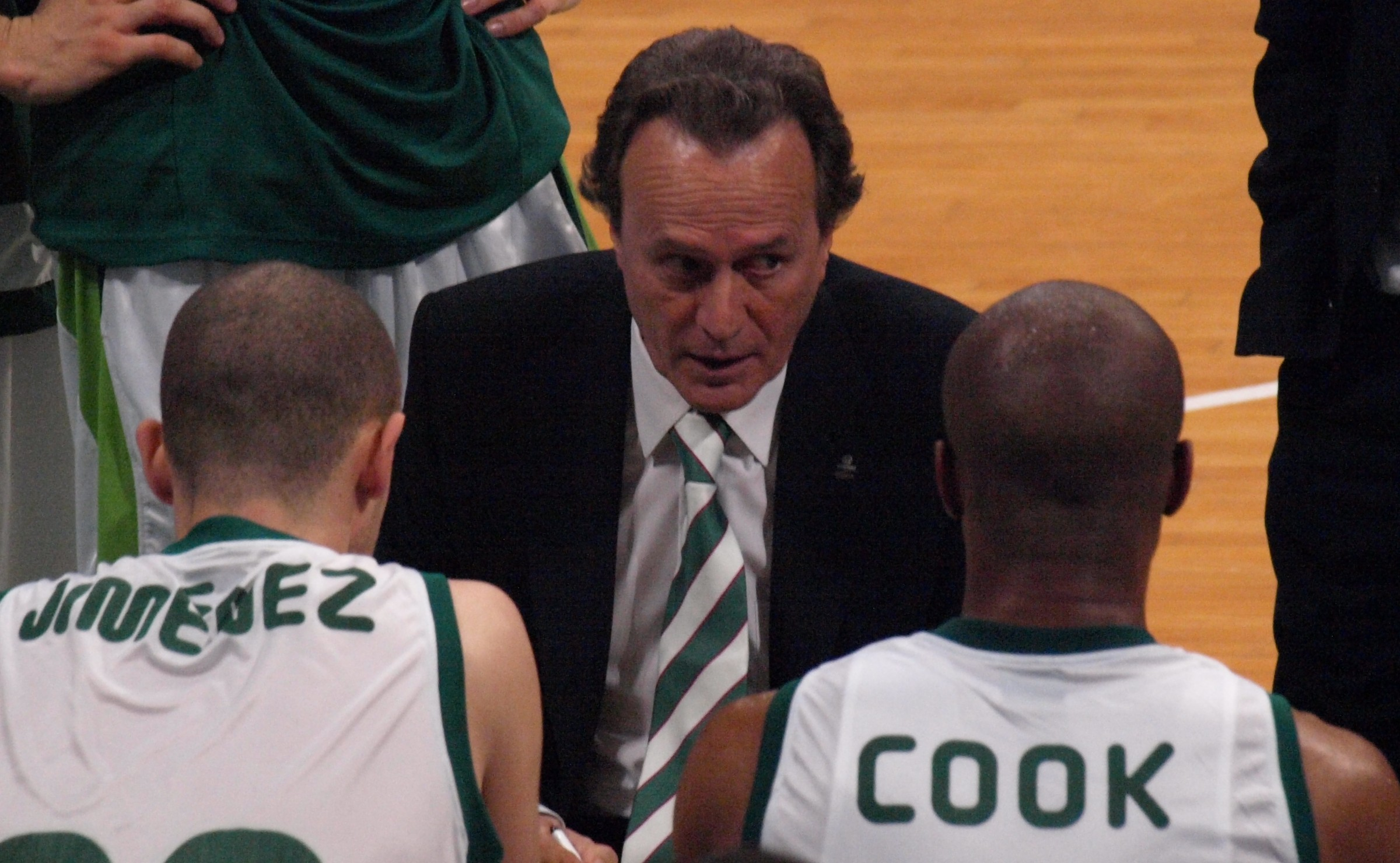
Aíto García Reneses is a 4 time Liga ACB AEEB Coach of the Year (1976, 1990, 2006, 2008).

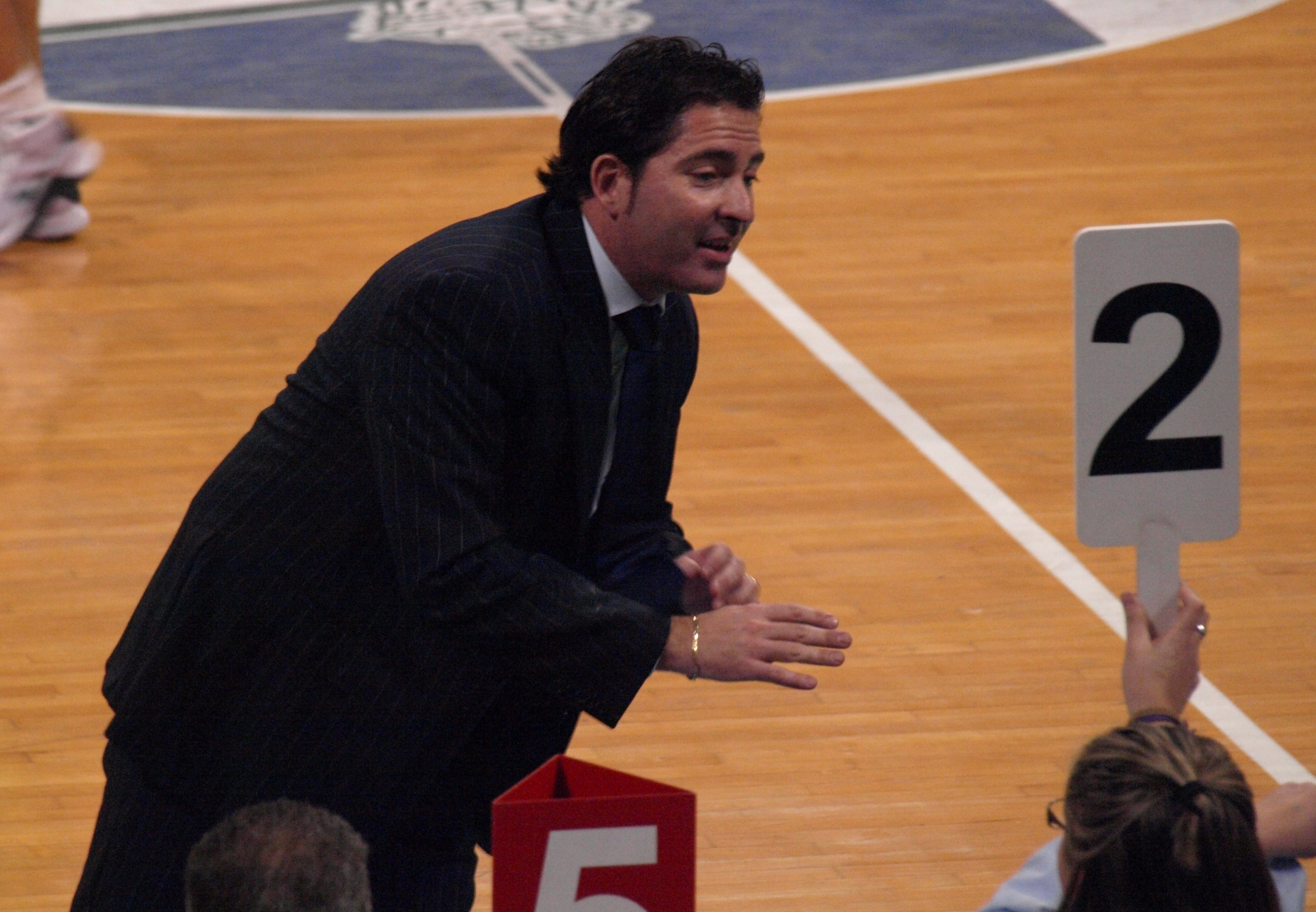
Xavi Pascual is a 3 time Liga ACB AEEB Coach of the Year (2009, 2010, 2011).

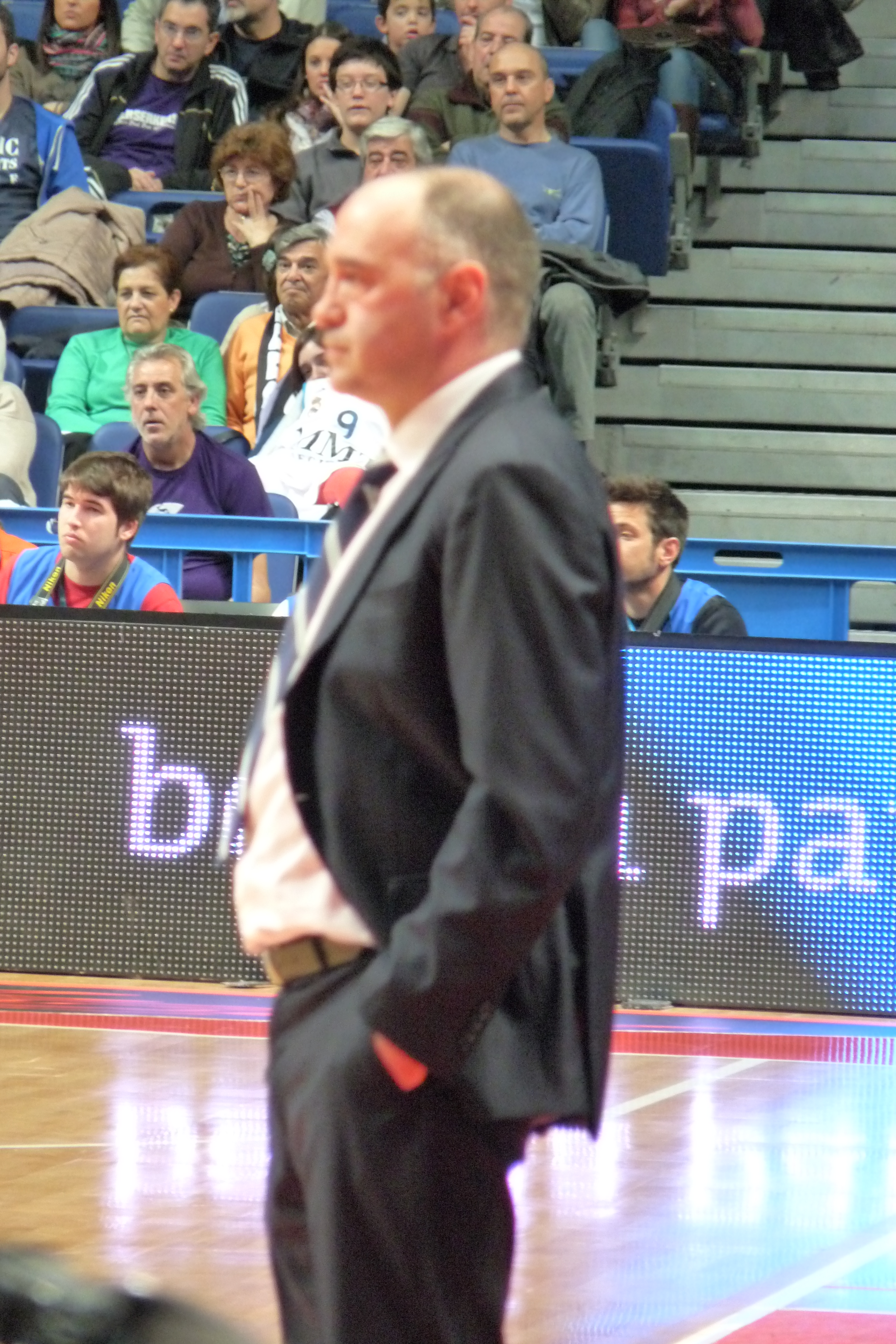
Pablo Laso is a 4 time Liga ACB AEEB Coach of the Year (2013, 2015, 2016, 2018).

Season	Coach	Liga ACB Team
1974–75	(Spain) Pedro Ferrándiz	Real Madrid
1975–76	(Spain) Aíto García Reneses	Cotonificio Badalona
1976–77	(Spain) Lolo Sainz	Real Madrid
1977–78	(Spain) Antoni Serra	Joventut Badalona
1978–79	(Spain) Rafael Peyró	
1979–80	(Spain) Ángel Palmi & (Spain) Luis Rodrigo	
1980–81	(Spain) Antonio Díaz-Miguel	
1981–82	(Spain) Ignacio Pinedo	
1982–83	(Spain) Antonio Díaz-Miguel (2×)	
1983–84	(Spain) Manuel Coloma	
1984–85	(Spain) Lolo Sainz (2×)	Real Madrid
1985–86	(Spain) Juan Jiménez	TDK Manresa
1986–87	(Spain) José Antonio Figueroa	Cajabilbao
1987–88	(Spain) Alfred Julbe	RAM Joventut
1988–89	(Spain) Mario Pesquera	Caja Ronda
1989–90	(Spain) Aíto García Reneses (2×)	FC Barcelona
1990–91	(Spain) Lolo Sainz (3×)	Montigalà Joventut
1991–92	(Spain) Miguel Ángel Martín	Estudiantes Caja Postal
1992–93	(Spain) Gustavo Aranzana	Elosúa León
1993–94	(Spain) Pedro Martínez	TDK Manresa
1994–95	(Spain) Javier Imbroda	Unicaja
1995–96	(Spain) Salva Maldonado	TDK Manresa
1996–97	(Spain) Alfred Julbe (2x)	Festina Joventut
1997–98	(Spain) Luis Casimiro	TDK Manresa
1998–99	(Spain) Javier Imbroda (2×)	Caja San Fernando
1999–00	(Italy) Sergio Scariolo	Real Madrid Teka
2000–01	(Montenegro) Duško Ivanović	TAU Cerámica
2001–02	(Spain) Edu Torres	Caprabo Lleida
2002–03	(Spain) Paco Olmos	Pamesa Valencia
2003–04	(Spain) Pepu Hernández	Adecco Estudiantes
2004–05	(Spain) Trifón Poch	Etosa Alicante
2005–06	(Spain) Aíto García Reneses (3×)	DKV Joventut
2006–07	(Spain) Joan Plaza	Real Madrid
2007–08	(Spain) Aíto García Reneses (4×)	DKV Joventut
2008–09	(Spain) Xavi Pascual	FC Barcelona
2009–10	(Spain) Xavi Pascual (2×)	FC Barcelona
2010–11	(Spain) Xavi Pascual (3×)	FC Barcelona
2011–12	(Spain) Sito Alonso	Lagun Aro GBC
2012–13	(Spain) Pablo Laso	Real Madrid
2013–14	(Croatia) Velimir Perasović	Valencia Basket
2014–15	(Spain) Pablo Laso (2×)	Real Madrid
2015–16	(Spain) Pablo Laso (3×)	Real Madrid
2016–17	(Spain) Pedro Martínez (2×)	Valencia Basket
2017–18	(Spain) Pablo Laso (4×)	Real Madrid
2018–19	(Serbia) Svetislav Pešić	FC Barcelona

== Most successful coaches ==
Below is the list of the most successful coaches, those with 2 or more awards won:

Name	Awards
(Spain) Aíto García Reneses	4
(Spain) Pablo Laso	4
(Spain) Lolo Sainz	3
(Spain) Xavi Pascual	3
(Spain) Antonio Díaz-Miguel	2
(Spain) Pedro Martínez	2
(Spain) Alfred Julbe	2
(Spain) Javier Imbroda	2

== See also ==
- ACB Best Coach
