= Basketball Champions League Best Coach =

Award of the Basketball Champions League

The Basketball Champions League (BCL) Best Coach, or FIBA Champions League Best Coach, is in an annual award of the Basketball Champions League, which is along with the EuroCup, one of the two secondary level European-wide professional club basketball leagues, that is given to the league's best head coach of the season. The award is given by FIBA. The award began with the league's 2017–18 season.

== Winners ==
Key
Coach (X)	Name of the coach and number of times they had won the award at that point (if more than one)
W%	Win percentage (not including qualifying rounds)
*	Inducted into the FIBA Hall of Fame
†	Denotes head coach whose team won championship that year

Season	Head Coach	Nationality	Club	Ref.
2017–18	John Patrick	United States	(Germany) MHP Riesen Ludwigsburg	
2018–19	Roel Moors	Belgium	(Belgium) Telenet Antwerp Giants	
2019–20	Oren Amiel	Israel	(Czech Republic) ERA Nymburk	
2020–21	Zoran Lukić	Serbia	(Russia) Nizhny Novgorod	
2021–22	Pedro Martínez	Spain	(Spain) Baxi Manresa	
2022–23†	Tuomas Iisalo	Finland	(Germany) Telekom Baskets Bonn	
2023–24	Vassilis Spanoulis	Greece	(Greece) Peristeri Athens	
2024–25	Txus Vidorreta	Spain	(Spain) La Laguna Tenerife	
2025–26	Dragan Šakota	Serbia	(Greece) AEK Betsson	

== Awards won by nationality ==
Country	Total
Spain	2
Belgium	1
Finland	1
Israel	1
Serbia	1
United States	1
Greece	1

== Awards won by club ==
Club	Total
(Germany) Riesen Ludwigsburg	1
(Belgium) Antwerp Giants	1
(Czech Republic) Nymburk	1
(Russia) Nizhny Novgorod	1
(Spain) Baxi Manresa	1
(Germany) Telekom Baskets Bonn	1
(Greece) Peristeri Athens	1
(Spain) Lenovo Tenerife	1
