= Pepu Hernández =

Spanish basketball coach

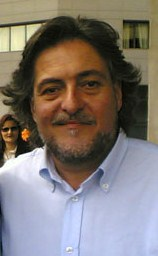
- Hernández, in 2007

Personal information
- Born: 11 February 1958 (age 68) Madrid, Spain
- Position: Head coach
- Coaching career: 1994–2012

Career history

Coaching
- 1990–1994: Estudiantes (assistant)
- 1994–2001, 2001-2005: Estudiantes
- 2006–2008: Spain
- 2010–2011: Joventut
- 2011–2012: Estudiantes

Career highlights
- As head coach: Spanish Cup winner (2000); AEEB Spanish Coach of the Year (2004)
Medals
Men's basketball
Head Coach for Spain
FIBA World Cup
Gold medal – first place	2006 Japan
EuroBasket
Silver medal – second place	2007 Spain

José Vicente "Pepu" Hernández Fernández (born 11 February 1958) is a Spanish former professional basketball coach.

== Coaching career ==
=== Club coaching career ===
During his club career, Hernández won the Spanish Cup in 2000, and the AEEB Spanish Coach of the Year award in 2004, while he was the head coach of Estudiantes.

=== National team coaching career ===
Between 2006 and June 2008, Hernández was the head coach of the senior Spain men's national basketball team, that won the gold medal at the 2006 FIBA World Championship, and the silver medal at the EuroBasket 2007.

== Awards and accomplishments ==
=== CB Estudiantes ===
- FIBA Korać Cup runner-up: 1999
- Spanish Cup winner: 2000
- Spanish League runner-up: 2004
- AEEB Spanish Coach of the Year: 2004

=== Spanish senior national team ===
- 2006 FIBA World Championship: Gold
- EuroBasket 2007: Silver

== Political career ==
On 30 January 2019, it was announced that Hernández would run in the Spanish Socialist Worker's Party's primary election to select the party challenger to become Mayor of Madrid (vis-à-vis the 2019 Madrid City Council election), facing Manuel de la Rocha and Chema Dávila as rivals. He won the primary election and ran for mayor of Madrid finishing in an all-time-worst fourth place for a PSOE candidate with just 13.7% of the vote.

He is not the only former Spanish men's national basketball team coach in politics. Javier Imbroda also entered politics, joining Citizens in Andalusia.

== See also ==
- FIBA Basketball World Cup winning head coaches
