= Javier Imbroda =

Andalusian basketball coach and politician

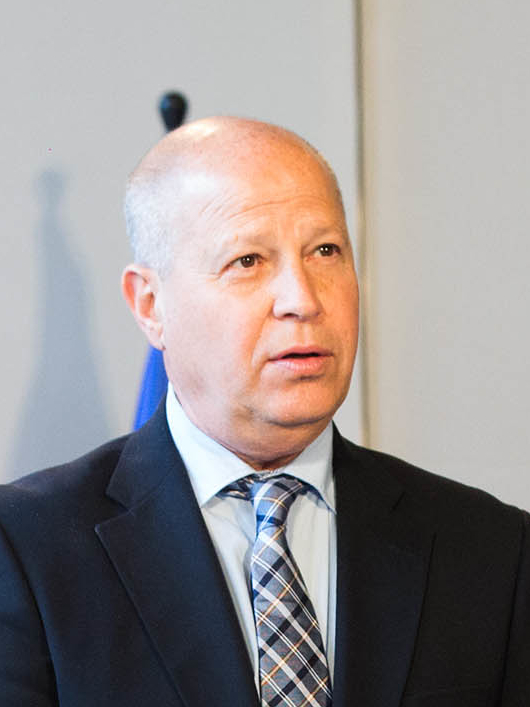
Imbroda in 2019

Francisco Javier Imbroda Ortiz (8 January 1961 in Melilla – 2 April 2022) was an Andalusian basketball coach and politician. He was the sixth coach with the most games directed in the Liga ACB. He served as a member of the Andalusian Parliament since 2018, and served as the Minister of Education and Sports from 2019 until his death from prostate cancer.

Imbroda died from prostate cancer in Málaga, on 2 April 2022, at the age of 61.
