= Duško Ivanović =

Montenegrin basketball coach and player

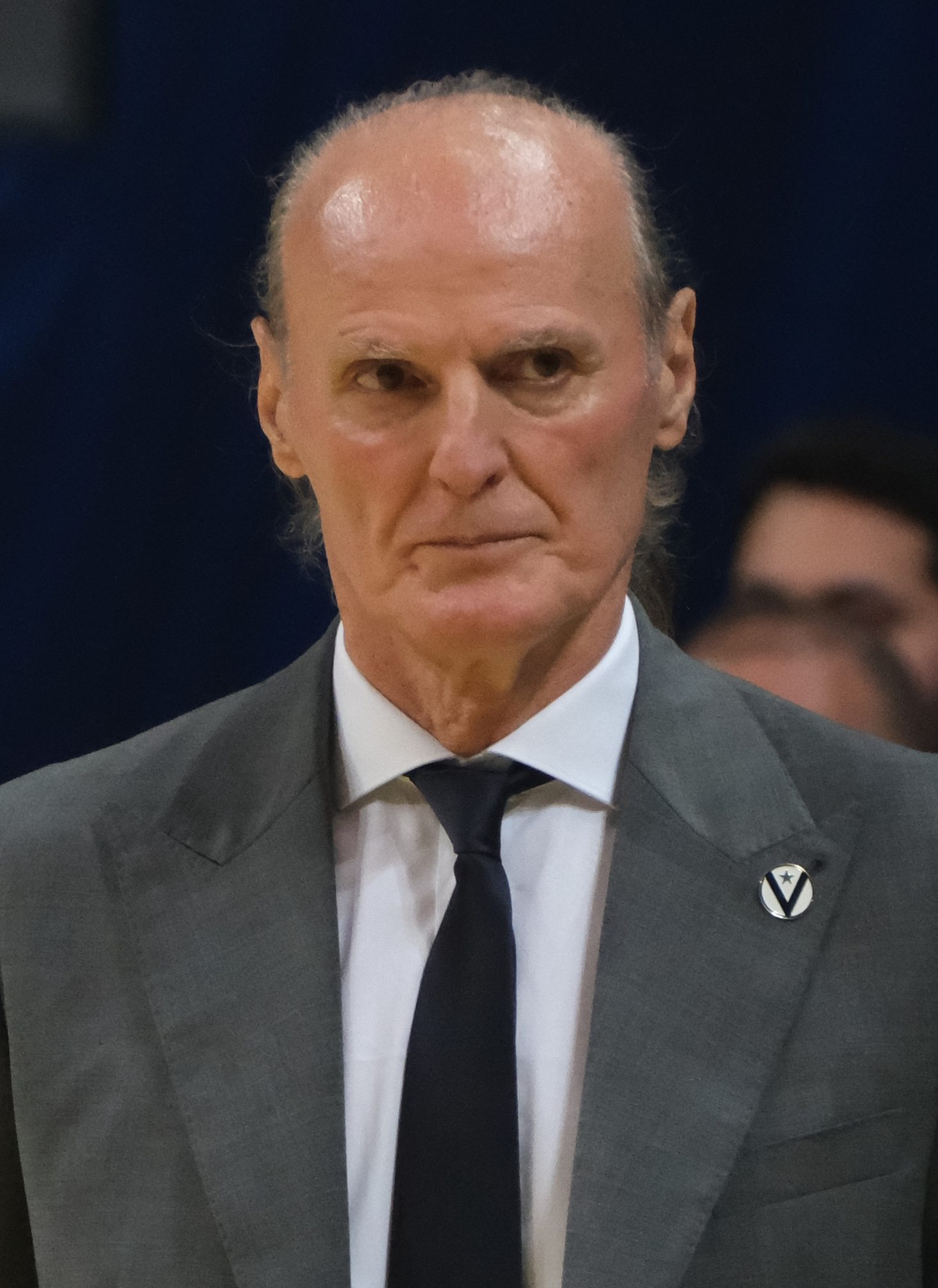
- Ivanović as Virtus Bologna head coach in 2025

Zenit Saint Petersburg
- Title: Head coach
- League: VTB United League

Personal information
- Born: September 1, 1957 (age 69) Bijelo Polje, PR Montenegro, Yugoslavia
- Listed height: 6 ft 5 in (1.96 m)
- Listed weight: 210 lb (95 kg)

Career information
- NBA draft: 1979: undrafted
- Playing career: 1980–1994
- Position: Shooting guard / small forward
- Coaching career: 1993–present

Career history

Playing
- 1980–1987: Budućnost
- 1987–1990: Jugoplastika
- 1990–1992: Girona
- 1992: Limoges CSP
- 1992–1993: Girona
- 1993–1994: Fribourg Olympic

Coaching
- 1993–1994: Fribourg Olympic (assistant)
- 1994–1995: Girona (assistant)
- 1995–1999: Fribourg Olympic
- 1999–2000: Limoges CSP
- 2000–2005: Baskonia
- 2005–2008: FC Barcelona
- 2008–2012: Baskonia
- 2014–2015: Panathinaikos
- 2016–2017: Khimki
- 2018–2019: Beşiktaş
- 2019–2021: Baskonia
- 2022–2023: Crvena zvezda
- 2023–2024: Baskonia
- 2024–2026: Virtus Bologna
- 2026–present: Zenit Saint Petersburg

Career highlights
- As player: 2× EuroLeague champion (1989, 1990); 3× Yugoslav League champion (1988–1990); Yugoslav Cup winner (1990); Yugoslav League Top Scorer (1983); As head coach: FIBA Korać Cup champion (2000); 3× Liga ACB champion (2002, 2010, 2020); Lega Serie A champion (2025); 3× Swiss League champion (1997–1999); Serbian League champion (2023); LNB Pro A champion (2000); 4× Spanish Cup winner (2002, 2004, 2007, 2009); 2× Swiss Cup winner (1997, 1998); 2× Basque Cup winner (2011, 2012); French Cup winner (2000); Greek Cup winner (2015); Serbian Cup winner (2023); Spanish Supercup winner (2008); LNB Pro A Coach of the Year (2000); AEEB Spanish Coach of the Year (2001); Liga ACB Coach of the Year (2009)

Duško Ivanović (Montenegrin: Душко Ивановић; born September 1, 1957) is a Montenegrin professional basketball coach and former player. He is currently the head coach for Zenit Saint Petersburg of the VTB United League.

== Professional playing career ==
As a player, Ivanović started his career with Jedinstvo Bijelo Polje. He played with Budućnost, Jugoplastika, Valvi Girona, Limoges CSP, and Fribourg Olympic. With Jugoplastika, he won two consecutive EuroLeague championships, in 1989 and 1990.

== Coaching career ==
Ivanović's coaching career started with Sisley Fribourg, in the 1993–94 season, where he was both a player and an assistant coach, working as a player-coach. In the 1994–95 season, he was an assistant coach of Valvi Girona. After that, he was the head coach of Fribourg Olympic (1995–1999), the senior Swiss national basketball team (1997–2000), CSP Limoges (1999–2000), TAU Cerámica (2000–2005), and FC Barcelona (2005–2008), from which he resigned, on 14 February 2008.

For the 2008–09 season, he was back at Vitoria, again working as the head coach of Caja Laboral, a position he held until November 2012, when he was fired.

On 10 June 2014, Ivanović signed a two-year contract with the Greek League team Panathinaikos. On 3 May 2015, after a 66–77 home game loss to Panathinaikos' arch rivals, Olympiacos, he parted ways with the team.

On 15 March 2016, Ivanović was hired as the new head coach of the Russian club Khimki. On 29 June 2017, he parted ways with Khimki.

On 20 August 2018, he signed a one-year deal with Beşiktaş. In December 2019, Ivanović left Beşiktaş, to return as head coach for Kirolbet Baskonia, once again. On 15 November 2021, he was fired again by Baskonia.

On 14 November 2022, Ivanović signed a two-year contract with the Serbian team Crvena zvezda, joining one day after the firing of head coach Vladimir Jovanović who was let go following a poor start in EuroLeague with only one win in 7 games.

In December 2024, Ivanović signed with Virtus Bologna of the Italian Lega Basket Serie A (LBA) and the EuroLeague. Virtus ended the EuroLeague at the 17th place, following a disappointing regular season. After the national championship season, ended at the first place, Virtus eliminated Reyer Venezia 3–2 and their arch-rival Olimpia Milano 3–1, reaching their fifth finals in a row. They then defeated Pallacanestro Brescia 3–0, claiming the Italian championship title for the 17th time. For Ivanović, this was the first scudetto of his career. On 27 March 2026, Virtus Bologna parted ways with Ivanović.

On June 25, 2026, Ivanović signed a three-year contract with Zenit Saint Petersburg of the VTB United League.

== Coaching record ==
Legend
G	Games coached	W	Games won	L	Games lost	W–L %	Win-loss %

Note: The EuroLeague is not the only competition in which the team played during the season. He also coached in domestic competition, and regional competition if applicable.

=== EuroLeague ===
Team	Year	G	W	L	W–L%	Result
Baskonia	2000–01	22	15	7	.682	Lost in the Finals
Baskonia	2001–02	15	11	4	.650	Eliminated in Top 16 stage
Baskonia	2002–03	20	11	9	.526	Eliminated in Top 16 stage
Baskonia	2003–04	20	13	7	.650	Eliminated in Top 16 stage
Baskonia	2004–05	20	11	9	.542	Lost in the final game
FC Barcelona	2005–06	25	14	11	.560	Lost in 3rd place game
FC Barcelona	2006–07	23	14	9	.609	Eliminated in quarterfinals
FC Barcelona	2007–08	14	9	5	.643	Fired
Baskonia	2008–09	21	14	7	.667	Eliminated in quarterfinals
Baskonia	2009–10	20	11	9	.550	Eliminated in quarterfinals
Baskonia	2010–11	20	10	10	.500	Eliminated in quarterfinals
Baskonia	2011–12	10	5	5	.500	Eliminated in regular season
Baskonia	2012–13	6	1	5	.167	Fired
Panathinaikos	2014–15	28	13	15	.464	Eliminated in quarterfinals
Khimki	2015–16	4	2	2	.500	Eliminated in Top 16 stage
Baskonia	2019–20	13	6	7	.462	Season stopped due to the COVID-19 pandemic
Baskonia	2020–21	34	18	16	.529	Eliminated in regular season
Baskonia	2021–22	9	3	6	.333	Fired
Crvena zvezda	2022–23	27	16	11	.593	Eliminated in regular season
Crvena zvezda	2023–24	4	1	3	.250	Fired
Baskonia	2023–24	34	18	16	.529	Eliminated in quarterfinals
Virtus Bologna	2024–25	20	7	13	.350	Eliminated in regular season
Virtus Bologna	2025–26	33	13	20	.394	Fired
Career		442	236	206	.534	

== Personal ==
In 2006, Ivanović took part in the Montenegrin independence campaign on the pro-independence side.

== See also ==
- Yugoslav First Federal Basketball League career stats leaders
