= Pedro Martínez (basketball) =

Spanish basketball coach

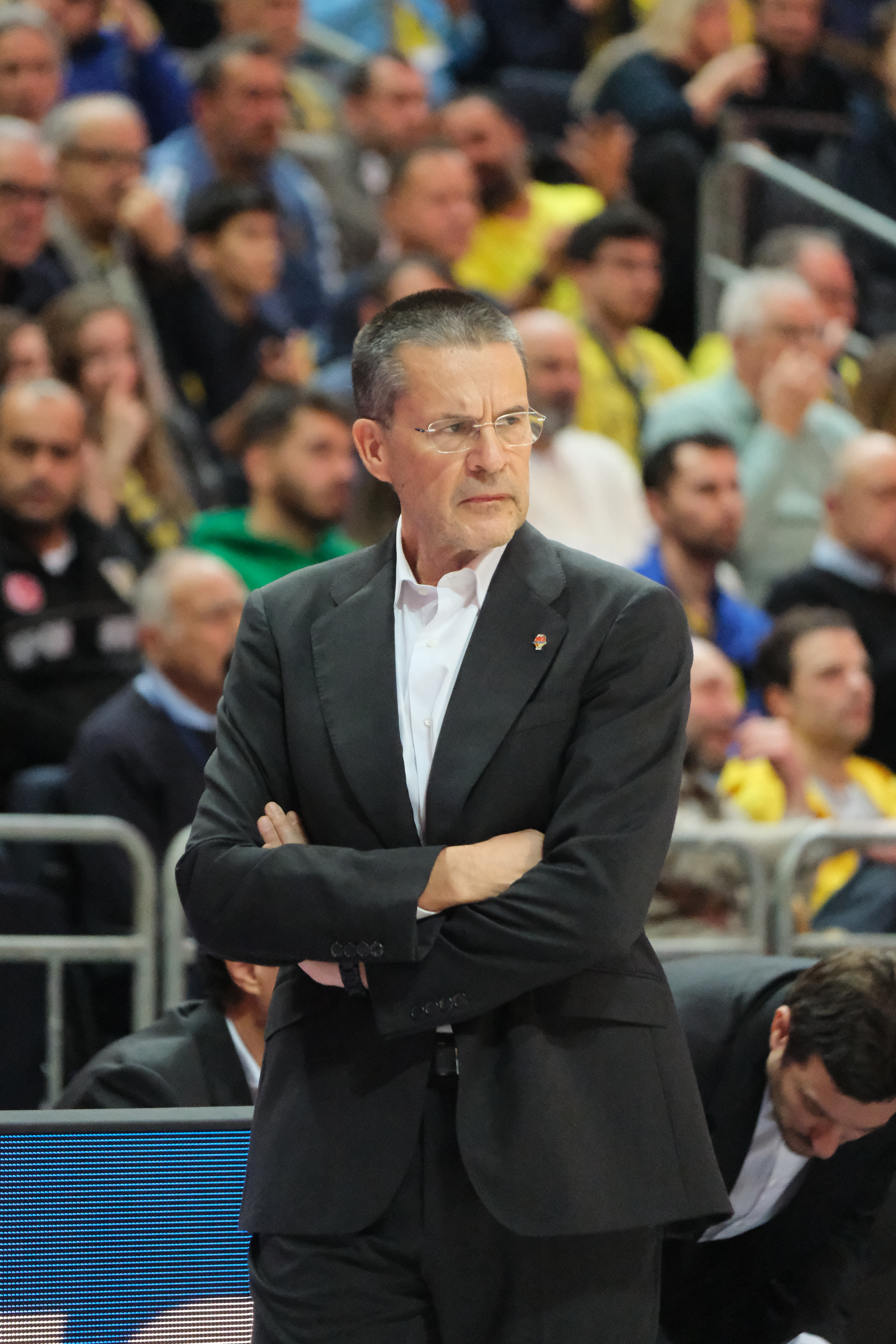
- Martínez with Valencia Basket in 2026

Real Madrid
- Position: Head coach
- League: Liga ACB; EuroLeague

Personal information
- Born: 29 June 1961 (age 65) Barcelona, Spain
- Coaching career: 1986–present

Career history

Coaching
- 1989–1990: Joventut Badalona (assistant)
- 1990: Joventut Badalona
- 1990–1994: Manresa
- 1994–1995: Joventut Badalona
- 1995–1996: Salamanca
- 1997–1998: Granada
- 1999–2000: Menorca
- 2001: Ourense
- 2001–2002: Tenerife
- 2002–2005: Gran Canaria
- 2005: Baskonia
- 2006–2007: Estudiantes
- 2007–2008: Girona
- 2008–2009: Sevilla
- 2009–2014: Gran Canaria
- 2014–2015: Manresa
- 2015–2017: Valencia
- 2017–2018: Baskonia
- 2019: Gran Canaria
- 2019–2024: Manresa
- 2024–2026: Valencia
- 2026–present: Real Madrid

Career highlights
- As head coach: FIBA Korać Cup champion (1990); EuroLeague SuperCup champion (2026); 2× Liga ACB champion (2017, 2026); 2× Spanish Supercup winner (2005, 2025); EuroLeague Coach of the Year (2026); 2× EuroCup Coach of the Year (2017, 2025); FIBA Champions Coach of the Year (2022); 2× AEEB Spanish Coach of the Year (1994, 2017)

Pedro Martínez Sánchez (born 29 June 1961) is a Spanish professional basketball coach for Real Madrid of the Spanish Liga ACB and the EuroLeague.

== Coaching career ==
Martínez has coached Gran Canaria, Cajasol, Girona, Manresa, and Joventut. He led Joventut to win the 1989-90 Korać Cup, becoming, at age 28, the youngest coach ever to win a European trophy. This record stills holds as of 2024.

He was appointed to the Sevilla head coach position in November 2008. He was voted the Spanish Basketball Coaches Association AEEB Spanish Coach of the Year in 1994. He was also named the European-wide 2nd-tier level EuroCup's Coach of the Year in 2017. Also in that year, Martínez managed Valencia Basket to win their first Liga ACB. However, he did not continue in the team.

On 27 October 2017 Martínez signed as Baskonia head coach, replacing Pablo Prigioni, twelve years after his previous experience in the Basque club. Baskonia made the 2017–18 EuroLeague playoffs, despite an initial 0-4 record when he joined the club. On 16 November 2018 Martínez parted ways with Baskonia after an opening 2-5 record in the EuroLeague, including the 99-84 road defeat at Budućnost VOLI.

In March 2019, Martínez returned to Gran Canaria, which was struggling in the EuroLeague and became the club's third coach of the season.

On 24 June 2019 Baxi Manresa announced the return of Martinez as head coach for the following season.

On 29 May 2024 Valencia Basket announced they had hired Martinez again as head coach for two seasons. In March 2026, Martinez signed a contract extension through the end of the 2027-2028 season.

On July 3, 2026, his departure as head coach of Valencia Basket was announced, as he triggered the release clause in his contract to take charge of Real Madrid.

== Coaching record ==
Legend
G	Games coached	W	Games won	L	Games lost	W–L %	Win-loss %

Note: The EuroLeague is not the only competition in which the team played during the season. He also coached in domestic competition, and regional competition if applicable.

=== EuroLeague ===
Team	Year	G	W	L	W–L%	Result
Baskonia	2005–06	4	3	1	.750	Sacked
Baskonia	2017–18	30	17	13	.567	Eliminated in the quarterfinals
Baskonia	2018–19	7	2	5	.286	Sacked
Career		41	22	19	.537	

== Awards and honors ==
Joventut Badalona

- FIBA Korać Cup: (1)
  - 1990

Tenerife

- Prince of Asturias Cup: Runner-up
  - 2002

Baskonia

- Spanish Supercup: (1)
  - 2005

Valencia

- Liga ACB: (1)
  - 2017
