= Txus Vidorreta =

Spanish basketball coach

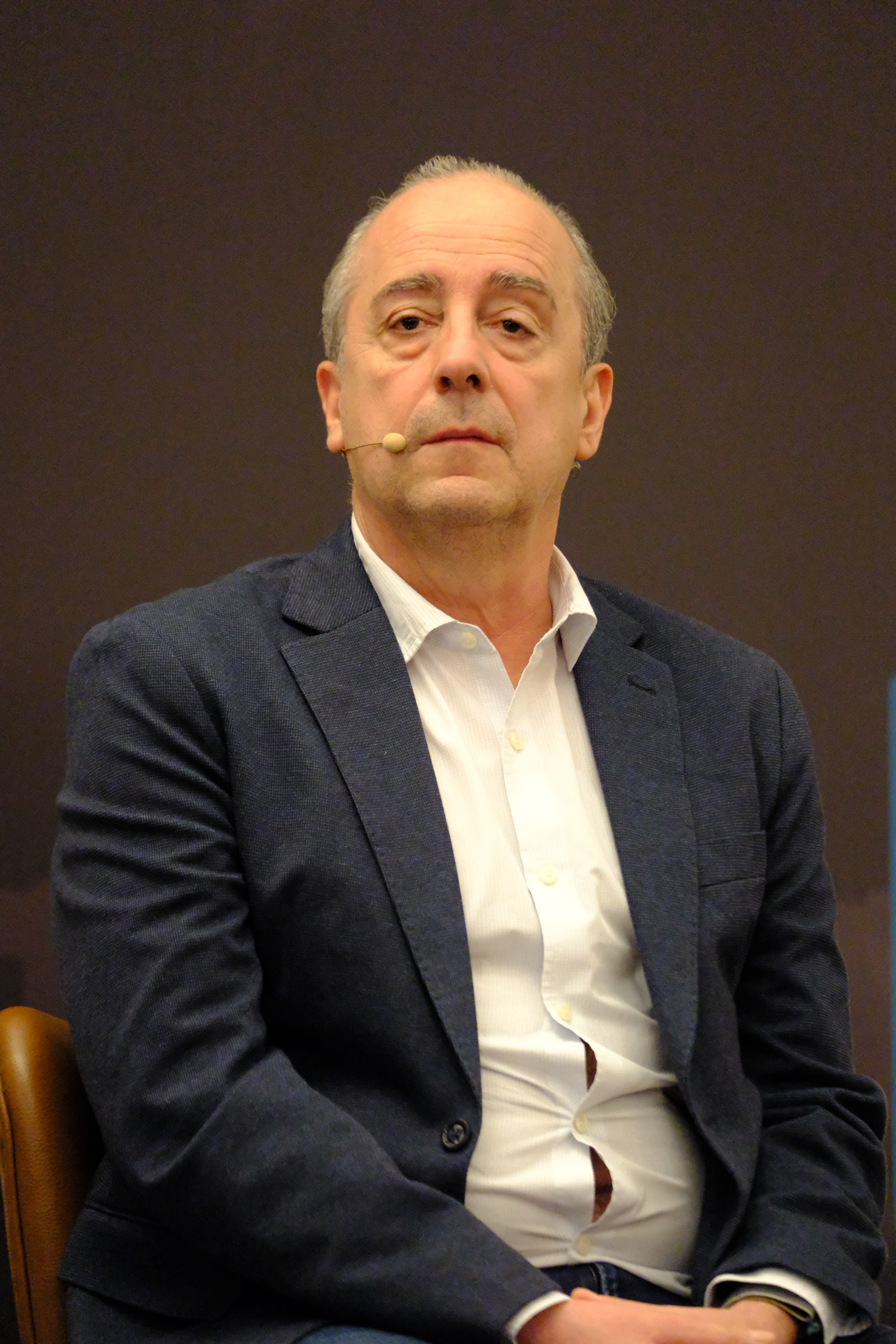
- Vidorreta in 2025

Unicaja
- Position: Head coach
- League: Liga ACB

Personal information
- Born: 20 June 1966 (age 60) Bilbao, Spain
- Coaching career: 1992–present

Career history

Coaching
- 1992–1993: Cajabilbao (assistant)
- 1993–1994: Cajabilbao
- 1995–1996: Askartza
- 1996–1997: Bilbao Patronato
- 1997–1998: Askartza
- 1998–2001: La Palma
- 2001–2010: Bilbao
- 2010–2012: Lucentum Alicante
- 2012–2015: Estudiantes
- 2015–2017: Canarias
- 2015–2017: Spain (assistant)
- 2017–2018: Valencia
- 2018–2026: Canarias
- 2026–present: Unicaja Málaga

Career highlights
- 2× FIBA Intercontinental Cup champion (2020, 2023); 2× FIBA Champions League champion (2017, 2022); FIBA Champions League Best Coach (2025); FIBA Champions League Coach of the Decade (2026); Spanish League Best Coach (2017); Spanish Supercup winner (2017)
Medals
Men's basketball
Assistant coach for Spain
Summer Olympics
Bronze medal – third place	2016 Rio
EuroBasket
Gold medal – first place	2015 France–Croatia–Germany–Latvia
Bronze medal – third place	2017 Finland–Israel–Romania–Turkey

Jesus "Txus" Gómez Vidorreta (born 20 June 1966) is a Spanish professional basketball coach who currently works as the head coach for Unicaja Málaga of the Spanish Liga ACB. Vidorreta, born in Bilbao, has coached several teams in Spain.

He has been most successful as the head coach of Canarias, he has won two Basketball Champions League titles, in 2017 and 2022, as well as two FIBA Intercontinental Cup titles, in 2020 and 2023.

== Coaching career ==
After winning a league promotion to the Spanish top-tier level, the Liga ACB, with Cajabilbao in 1994, Vidorreta continued managing teams in the Spanish lower divisions.

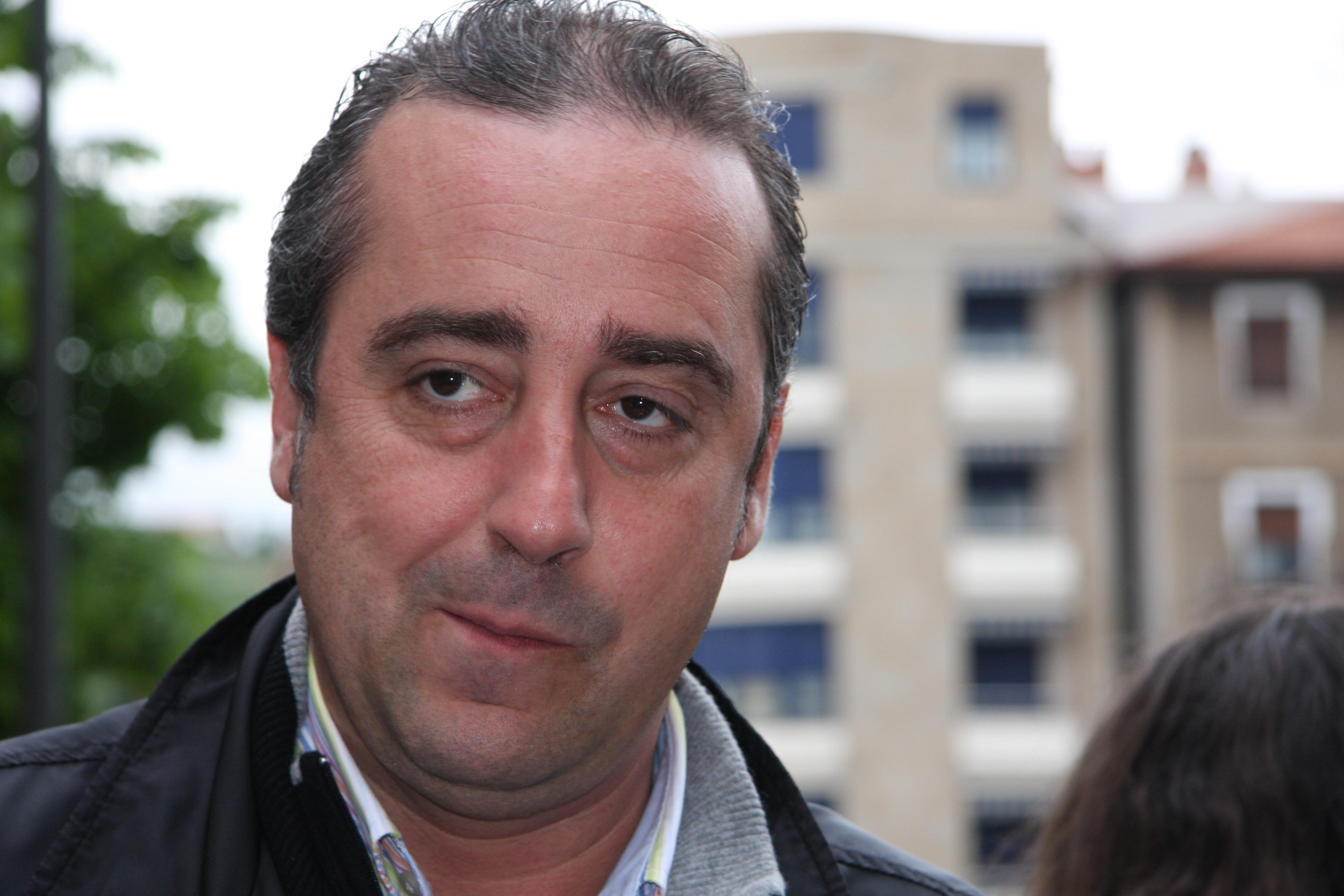
Vidorreta in 2009

In 2001, he was appointed as the head coach of the newly created Bilbao Basket, which started playing in the LEB Plata, the Spanish third-tier league, at the time. With the Basque club, Vidorreta won two league promotions in three seasons, and made his debut as a head coach in the Liga ACB in 2004. He continued there for six more seasons, until being sacked in January 2010.

Vidorreta then worked as a head coach of several different ACB teams, such as Lucentum Alicante, Estudiantes, and Canarias, where he arrived in November 2015.

In April 2017, Vidorreta won his first European-wide continental title, by winning the championship of the European third-level Champions League 2016–17 season. Vidorreta was the first coach to win this newly established continental league.

On 20 June 2017, Vidorreta was announced as the new head coach of the reigning Spanish League champion, Valencia Basket. With Valencia, Vidorreta coached in the EuroLeague, where the team had a 12–18 record. In the ACB season, Valencia was eliminated in the quarterfinals of the playoffs by Herbalife Gran Canaria. On June 8, 2018, Valencia Basket announced Vidorreta and the club parted ways.

On 11 June 2018, Vidorreta returned to Iberostar Tenerife as he signed a 3-year contract with the club. He had his contract extended by two years on May 20, 2020. On May 8, 2022, Vidorreta won his second Champions League title after his team defeated Manresa in the final of the Final Four in Bilbao.

On 12 February 2023, he won the 2023 FIBA Intercontinental Cup with Canarias after defeating Monastir in the semi-finals and São Paulo in the final.

In the 2024–25 season, Tenerife was eliminated in the BCL semi-finals by Galatasaray. On 10 May 2025, Vidorreta was named the Basketball Champions League Best Coach.

== Coaching record ==
Legend
G	Games coached	W	Games won	L	Games lost	W–L %	Win-loss %

Note: The EuroLeague is not the only competition in which the team played during the season. He also coached in domestic competition, and regional competition if applicable.

=== EuroLeague ===
Team	Year	G	W	L	W–L%	Result
Valencia	2017–18	30	12	18	.400	Eliminated in regular season
Career		30	12	18	.400	

== Honours and awards ==
=== Club ===
Canarias

- FIBA Intercontinental Cup: (2023)
- 2× Basketball Champions League: (2017, 2022)

=== Individual ===
- LEB 2 Coach of the Season: (2002)
- LEB Coach of the Season: (2004)
- ACB Best Coach: (2017)
- Basketball Champions League Best Coach: (2025)
