= Joan Plaza =

Spanish professional basketball coach

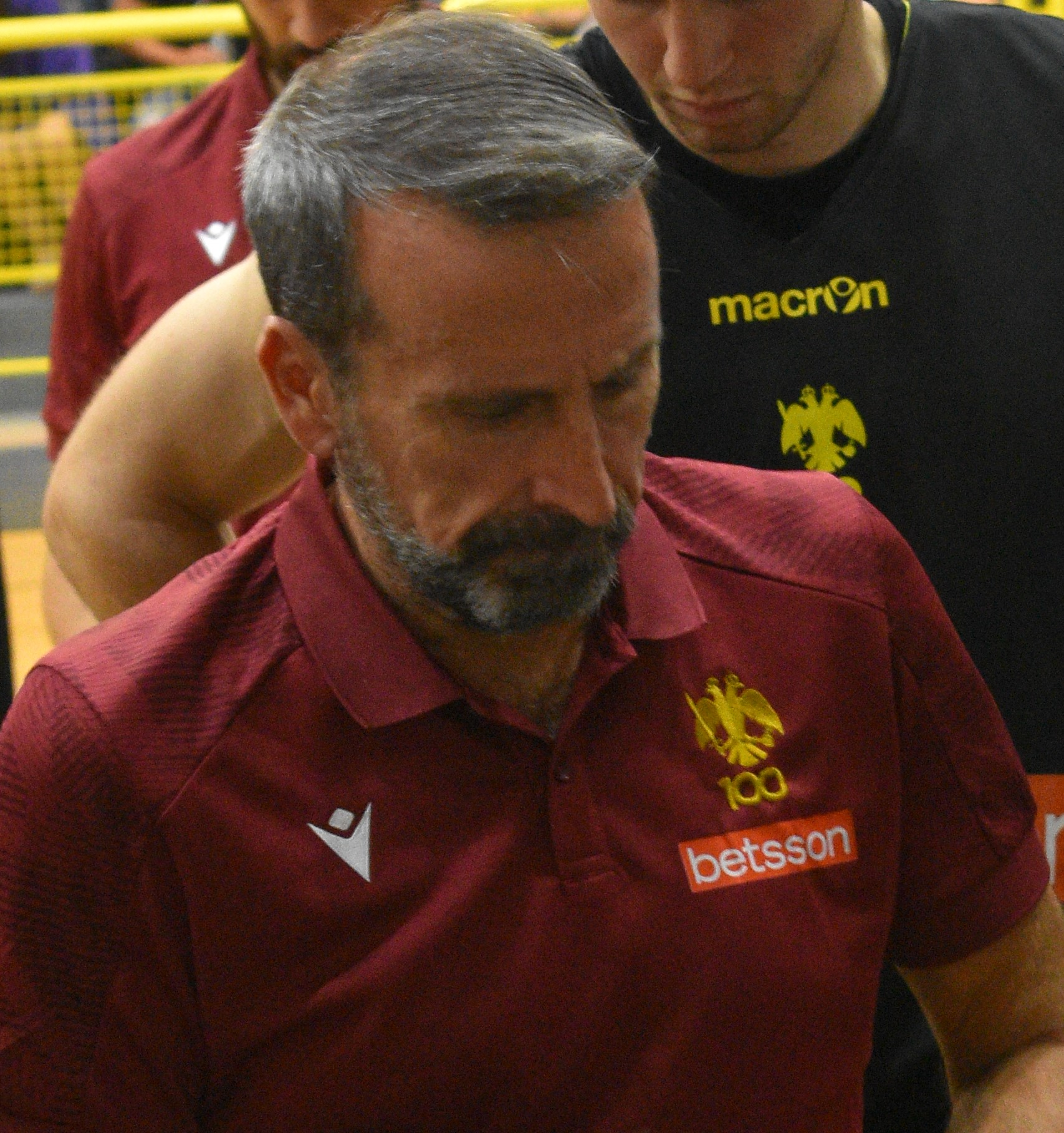
- Plaza in 2023

Personal information
- Born: 26 December 1963 (age 62) Barcelona, Spain
- Position: Head coach
- Coaching career: 2000–present

Career history

Coaching
- 2000–2005: Joventut Badalona (assistant)
- 2005–2006: Real Madrid (assistant)
- 2006–2009: Real Madrid
- 2009–2012: Cajasol Sevilla
- 2012–2013: Žalgiris Kaunas
- 2013–2018: Unicaja Malaga
- 2018–2020: Zenit Saint Petersburg
- 2020–2021: Real Betis
- 2023–2024: AEK Athens
- 2025–2026: Andorra
- 2026: Casademont Zaragoza

Career highlights
- As head coach: EuroCup champion (2007, 2017); LKL champion (2013); LKL Coach of the Year (2013); AEEB Spanish Coach of the Year (2007); ACB Best Coach (2008)

Joan Plaza Durán (born 26 December 1963) is a Spanish professional basketball coach who last served as head coach of Casademont Zaragoza. He coached Real Madrid for three years, winning one Liga ACB championship, and a ULEB Cup (now called EuroCup) title.

== Coaching career ==
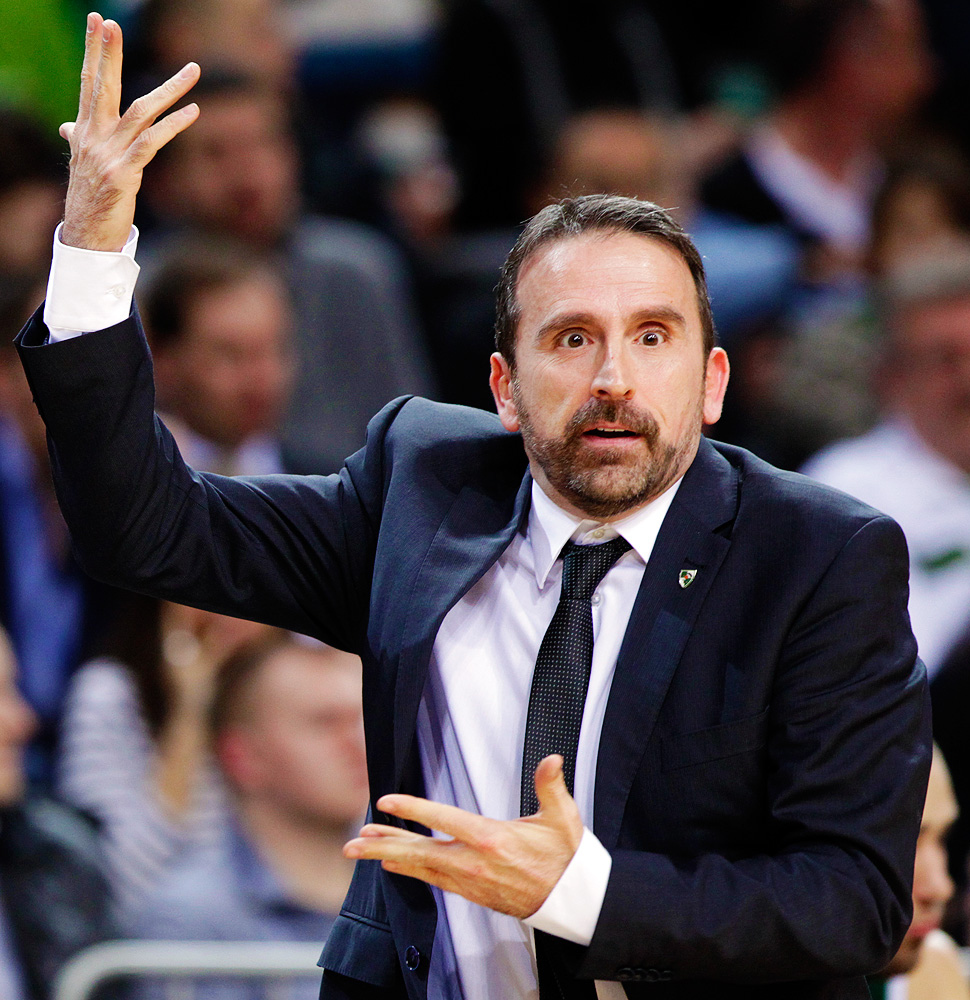
Plaza with Žalgiris.

Joan Plaza began his career with the basketball school founded by him and his brothers, EB Betsaida. At the same time, he worked for the women's team EB Santísima Trinitat, as well as the small club CB Sant Adriá. In 1995, he at last became a new coach of Joventut de Badalona, where he worked as the youth and assistant trainer, until 2004. His greatest achievement was in the 2000–01 season when his team won the Spanish Under-20 championship.

In the summer of 2004, following the wishes of the new coach Božidar Maljković, Plaza switched to Real Madrid. When the Serbian coach left after a disappointing season, Plaza assumed the position of head coach.

In the following season, Real Madrid won their first thirteen Liga ACB games in a row, giving Plaza a new record for a coach in his first season. The team also won the European-wide ULEB Cup (now called EuroCup) competition, and he was named the AEEB Coach of the Year.

In the 2007–08 season, Real Madrid signed Greek star Lazaros Papadopoulos, who failed to perform well during the whole season. The team lost in the first round of the Liga ACB playoffs and didn't reach the EuroLeague Final Four for the 12th consecutive year. Madrid's 2008–09 season's team was reformed but failed once again to reach the EuroLeague Final Four or to perform well in the Spanish Cup. After losing in the Liga ACB playoffs' second round to TAU Cerámica, Plaza was sacked, and he was replaced by the 4 times EuroLeague champion head coach, Ettore Messina, on June 18. The following day, he signed a one-year contract with the Spanish club Cajasol Sevilla.

In the 2016–17 season Plaza won his second EuroCup title with Unicaja after beating Valencia BC in the Finals. Plaza became the third coach to have won multiple EuroCup titles.

On November 30, 2020, he signed 1+1 year contract with Coosur Real Betis of the Liga ACB.

In June 2023, Plaza signed a two-year contract with AEK Athens of the Greek Basket League. On January 25, 2024, he parted ways with the Greek club.

On January 23, 2025, he signed with Andorra of the Spanish Liga ACB. On January 26, 2026, Andorra and Plaza parted ways.

On February 17, 2026, he signed with Casademont Zaragoza of the Liga ACB and the Europe Cup. On May 17, 2026, Zaragoza parted ways with Plaza.

== Coaching record ==
Legend
| G | Games coached | W | Games won | L | Games lost | W–L % | Win-loss % |

Note: The EuroLeague is not the only competition in which the team played during the season. He also coached in domestic competition, and regional competition if applicable.

=== EuroLeague ===
| Team | Year | G | W | L | W–L% | Result |
|---|---|---|---|---|---|---|
| Real Madrid | 2007–08 | 20 | 14 | 6 | .700 | Eliminated in Top 16 stage |
| Real Madrid | 2008–09 | 20 | 12 | 8 | .600 | Eliminated in quarterfinals |
| Žalgiris | 2012–13 | 24 | 14 | 10 | .583 | Eliminated in Top 16 stage |
| Unicaja | 2013–14 | 24 | 11 | 13 | .583 | Eliminated in Top 16 stage |
| Unicaja | 2014–15 | 24 | 8 | 16 | .333 | Eliminated in Top 16 stage |
| Unicaja | 2015–16 | 24 | 11 | 13 | .458 | Eliminated in Top 16 stage |
| Unicaja | 2017–18 | 30 | 13 | 17 | .333 | Eliminated in regular season |
| Zenit | 2019–20 | 28 | 8 | 20 | .333 | Eliminated in regular season |
| Career | | 194 | 91 | 103 | .469 | |

== Honours ==
Unicaja

- EuroCup (1): 2016–17

Real Madrid

- ULEB Cup (1): 2006–07
- Liga ACB (1): 2006–07

Žalgiris Kaunas

- Lithuanian Supercup (1): 2012
- Lietuvos krepšinio lyga (1) : 2013

Individual

- AEEB Spanish Coach of the Year: 2007
- ACB Best Coach: 2008
- LKL Coach of the Year: 2013
