= Eurocup Basketball 2010–11 Last 16 Group K =

Standings and results for Group K of the last 16 phase of the 2010–11 Eurocup basketball tournament.

== Standings ==
Key to colors
| Top two places in each group advance to the Quarterfinals |

| | Team | Pld | W | L | PF | PA | Diff | Tie-break |
|---|---|---|---|---|---|---|---|---|
| 1. | (Spain) Asefa Estudiantes | 6 | 5 | 1 | 489 | 459 | +30 | 1–1 (+8) |
| 2. | (Italy) Pepsi Caserta | 6 | 5 | 1 | 474 | 453 | +21 | 1–1 (−8) |
| 3. | (Turkey) Galatasaray Café Crown | 6 | 2 | 4 | 409 | 421 | −12 | |
| 4. | (Czech Republic) ČEZ Nymburk | 6 | 0 | 6 | 451 | 490 | −39 | |

== Fixtures and results ==
All times given below are in Central European Time.

=== Game 1 ===
18 January 2011
20:00

Report

| Asefa Estudiantes (Spain) | 87–80 | (Czech Republic) ČEZ Nymburk |
Scoring by quarter: 29–25, 18–22, 19–14, 21–19
| Pts: Asselin 20; Rebs: Jasen 7 Asts: Granger 10 | | Pts: Simmons 16; Rebs: Pumprla 8 Asts: Lenzly, Simmons 5 |

Palacio Vistalegre, Madrid
Attendance: 2,000
Referees: Fabio Facchini (ITA), Apostolos Kalpakas (SWE), Renaud Geller (BEL)

18 January 2011
20:30

Report

| Pepsi Caserta (Italy) | 81–76 (OT) | (Turkey) Galatasaray Café Crown |
Scoring by quarter: 18–13, 19–14, 20–21, 12–21, Overtime: 12–7
| Pts: Ere 19; Rebs: Jones 11; Asts: Bowers 3 | | Pts: Rochestie 16; Rebs: Rančík 7 Asts: Açık 4 |

PalaMaggiò, Caserta
Attendance: 1,960
Referees: Sradan Dozai (CRO), Miguel Angel Perez Niz (ESP), Joseph Bissang (FRA)

=== Game 2 ===
25 January 2011
18:30

Report

| ČEZ Nymburk (Czech Republic) | 68–74 | (Italy) Pepsi Caserta |
Scoring by quarter: 18–13, 23–28, 15–17, 12–16
| Pts: Simmons 21; Rebs: Benda, Simmons 7 Asts: Simmons 4 | | Pts: Williams 18; Rebs: Jones 12; Asts: Koszarek 4 |

ČEZ Arena, Pardubice
Attendance: 3,870
Referees: Spiros Gkontas (GRE), Sergiy Chebyshev (UKR), Zdravko Rutesic (MNE)

25 January 2011
19:30

Report

| Galatasaray Café Crown (Turkey) | 57–68 | (Spain) Asefa Estudiantes |
Scoring by quarter: 21–20, 18–21, 9–12, 9–15
| Pts: Andrić 14; Rebs: Büker, Yıldırım 6 Asts: Büker 3 | | Pts: Asselin 16; Rebs: Four players 5 Asts: Granger 6 |

Abdi İpekçi Arena, Istanbul
Attendance: 2,945
Referees: Robert Lottermoser (GER), Seffi Shemmesh (ISR), Marko Juras (SRB)

=== Game 3 ===
1 February 2011
19:00

Report

| Galatasaray Café Crown (Turkey) | 76–75 | (Czech Republic) ČEZ Nymburk |
Scoring by quarter: 14–17, 18–23, 16–16, 28–19
| Pts: Shipp 17; Rebs: Shipp 13; Asts: Açık 5 | | Pts: Simmons 22; Rebs: Pumprla, Simmons 6 Asts: Benda 5 |

Abdi İpekçi Arena, Istanbul
Attendance: 1,150
Referees: Juan Carlos Mitjana (ESP), Radomira Vojinovic (MNE), Antonio Conde (ESP)

1 February 2011
20:30

Report

| Pepsi Caserta (Italy) | 87–85 | (Spain) Asefa Estudiantes |
Scoring by quarter: 25–22, 22–22, 14–19, 26–22
| Pts: Ere 17; Rebs: Jones 8 Asts: Bowers, Jones 3 | | Pts: Gabriel 20; Rebs: Gabriel 9 Asts: Welsch, Sánchez 3 |

PalaMaggiò, Caserta
Attendance: 2,061
Referees: Fernando Rocha (POR), David Chambon (FRA), Andrej Jersan (SLO)

=== Game 4 ===
15 February 2011
18:00

Report

| ČEZ Nymburk (Czech Republic) | 62–77 | (Turkey) Galatasaray Café Crown |
Scoring by quarter: 19–22, 13–19, 14–16, 16–20
| Pts: Simmons 18; Rebs: Štimac 4 Asts: Nissim, Lenzly 3 | | Pts: Ermal 22; Rebs: Shipp 10; Asts: Açık 5 |

ČEZ Arena, Pardubice
Attendance: 5,432
Referees: Grzegorz Ziemblicki (POL), Olive Krause (GER), Gianluca Mattioli (ITA)

15 February 2011
19:45

Report

| Asefa Estudiantes (Spain) | 90–80 | (Italy) Pepsi Caserta |
Scoring by quarter: 23–28, 16–12, 25–22, 26–18
| Pts: Caner-Medley 14; Rebs: Caner-Medley 13; Asts: Welsch 6 | | Pts: Bowers 22; Rebs: Jones 11; Asts: Di Bella 3 |

Palacio Vistalegre, Madrid
Attendance: 6,000
Referees: Sasa Pukl (SLO), Nicola Maestre (FRA), Panagiotis Anastopoulos (GRE)

=== Game 5 ===
22 February 2011
18:30

Report

| ČEZ Nymburk (Czech Republic) | 86–88 | (Spain) Asefa Estudiantes |
Scoring by quarter: 23–18, 28–24, 18–20, 17–26
| Pts: Štimac 22; Rebs: Štimac 7 Asts: Nečas 5 | | Pts: Jasen 18; Rebs: Caner-Medley 9 Asts: Oliver, Sánchez 4 |

ČEZ Arena, Pardubice
Attendance: 3,362
Referees: Sradan Dozai (CRO), Tomas Jasevicius (LTU), Enrico Sabetta (ITA)

22 February 2011
19:45

Report

| Galatasaray Café Crown (Turkey) | 54–64 | (Italy) Pepsi Caserta |
Scoring by quarter: 14–22, 6–19, 20–11, 14–12
| Pts: Shumpert 15; Rebs: Shumpert 13; Asts: Açık 3 | | Pts: Williams 13; Rebs: Jones 7 Asts: Jones 3 |

Ayhan Şahenk Arena, Istanbul
Attendance: 1,850
Referees: Dubravko Muhvic (CRO), Matej Boltzauer (SLO), Elias Koromilas (GRE)

=== Game 6 ===
1 March 2011
19:30

Report

| Asefa Estudiantes (Spain) | 71–69 | (Turkey) Galatasaray Café Crown |
Scoring by quarter: 23–20, 19–14, 15–15, 14–20
| Pts: Asselin 22; Rebs: Asselin 8 Asts: Granger 6 | | Pts: Shumpert 18; Rebs: Shumpert 7 Asts: Kuqo 2 |

Palacio Vistalegre, Madrid
Attendance: 3,000
Referees: Fabio Facchini (ITA), Apostolos Kalpakas (SWE), Renaud Geller (BEL)

1 March 2011
19:30

Report

| Pepsi Caserta (Italy) | 88–80 | (Czech Republic) ČEZ Nymburk |
Scoring by quarter: 24–24, 27–14, 13–29, 24–13
| Pts: Ere 15; Rebs: Di Bella, Doornekamp 6 Asts: Colussi 3 | | Pts: Nissim 22; Rebs: Nečas 8 Asts: Nissim 3 |

PalaMaggiò, Caserta
Attendance: 1,922
Referees: Marek Cmikiewicz (POL), Andrej Lovsyn (SLO), Luis Lopes (POR)
