= 2010–11 Eurocup Basketball =

- League: Eurocup
- Sport: Men's basketball
- Duration: September 29, 2010 – April 17, 2011
- Third place: (Croatia) Cedevita
- Season MVP: (Croatia) Dontaye Draper (Cedevita)
- Top scorer: (Azerbaijan) Jaycee Carroll (Gran Canaria 2014)

Finals
- Champions: (Russia) UNICS (1st title)
- Runners-up: (Spain) Cajasol
- Finals MVP: (Croatia) Marko Popović (UNICS)

Eurocup Basketball seasons
- ← 2009–10 2011–12 →

2010–11 Eurocup Basketball was the ninth edition of Europe's second-tier level transnational competition for men's professional basketball clubs, the EuroCup. The EuroCup is the European-wide league level that is one tier below the EuroLeague level. It began with qualifying round matches on September 29, 2010, and ended on April 16-17, 2011, with the 2010–11 Eurocup Finals, which was played at the Arena Palaverde, in Treviso.

== Teams ==
Group stage
| Country (League) | Teams | Teams (rankings in 2009–10 national championships) | | |
|---|---|---|---|---|
| Germany (BBL) | 2 | EWE Baskets (5th) | Göttingen (7th) | |
| Greece (ESAKE A1) | 2 | Panellinios (4th) | PAOK (5th) | |
| Spain (ACB) | 2 | Cajasol (6th) | Asefa Estudiantes (7th) | |
| Italy (Serie A) | 1 | Bennet Cantù (4th) | | |
| Latvia (LBL) | 1 | VEF Rīga (2nd) | | |
| Lithuania (LKL) | 1 | Šiauliai (3rd) | | |
| Poland (PLK) | 1 | Anwil Włocławek (2nd) | | |
| Russia (PBL) | 1 | Krasnye Krylia (8th) | | |
Losers of Euroleague 2010–11 qualifying rounds
| Country (League) | Teams | Teams (rankings in 2009–10 national championships) | | |
| France (Pro A) | 3 | Chorale Roanne (3rd) | ASVEL (4th) | Le Mans (2nd) |
| Czech Republic (NBL) | 1 | ČEZ Nymburk (1st) | | |
| Germany (BBL) | 1 | Alba Berlin (6th) | | |
| Israel (Ligat HaAl) | 1 | Hapoel Gilboa Galil (1st) | | |
| Italy (Serie A) | 1 | Pepsi Caserta (3rd) | | |
| Montenegro (Opportunity Liga) | 1 | Budućnost (1st) | | |
| Netherlands (FEB) | 1 | GasTerra Flames (1st) | | |
| Russia (PBL) | 1 | UNICS (3rd) | | |
| Serbia (KLS) | 1 | Hemofarm (2nd) | | |
| Turkey (TBL) | 1 | Bandırma Banvit (3rd) | | |
| Ukraine (SuperLeague) | 1 | Budivelnyk (2nd) | | |
Qualifying round
| Country (League) | Teams | Teams (rankings in 2009–10 national championships) | | |
| Turkey (TBL) | 2 | Beşiktaş Cola Turka (4th) | Galatasaray Café Crown (9th) | |
| Croatia (A1 Liga) | 1 | Cedevita (3rd) | | |
| Greece (ESAKE A1) | 1 | Aris (7th) | | |
| Israel (Ligat HaAl) | 1 | Hapoel Jerusalem (3rd) | | |
| Italy (Serie A) | 1 | Benetton Bwin Treviso (8th) | | |
| Spain (ACB) | 1 | Gran Canaria 2014 (8th) | | |
| Ukraine (SuperLeague) | 1 | Azovmash (1st) | | |

== Qualifying round ==
| Team 1 | Agg. | Team 2 | 1st leg | 2nd leg |
|---|---|---|---|---|
| Beşiktaş Cola Turka (Turkey) | 152–137 | (Germany) Deutsche Bank Skyliners | 68–61 | 84–76 |
| Hapoel Jerusalem (Israel) | 146–132 | (Belgium) Belgacom Liège | 62–59 | 84–73 |
| Aris (Greece) | 170–167 | (Bulgaria) Lukoil Academic | 78–74 | 92–93 |
| Gran Canaria 2014 (Spain) | 165–131 | (Croatia) Zagreb CO | 69–71 | 96–60 |
| Azovmash (Ukraine) | 155–145 | (France) Entente Orléanaise | 76–80 | 79–65 |
| Spartak Saint Petersburg (Russia) | 136–139 | (Turkey) Galatasaray Café Crown | 58–69 | 78–70 |
| Benetton Bwin Treviso (Italy) | 181–118 | (Cyprus) APOEL | 97–55 | 84–63 |
| Dynamo Moscow (Russia) | 134–169 | (Croatia) Cedevita | 61–97 | 73–72 |

== Regular season ==
The Regular Season ran from November 16, 2010 to December 21, 2010.

If teams were level on record at the end of the Regular Season, tiebreakers were applied in the following order:

1. Head-to-head record.
2. Head-to-head point differential.
3. Point differential during the Regular Season.
4. Points scored during the regular season.
5. Sum of quotients of points scored and points allowed in each Regular Season match.

Key to colors
| Top two places in each group advance to Top 16 |
| Eliminated |

=== Group A ===
| | Team | Pld | W | L | PF | PA | Diff |
|---|---|---|---|---|---|---|---|
| 1. | (Russia) UNICS | 6 | 5 | 1 | 507 | 379 | +128 |
| 2. | (France) Le Mans | 6 | 4 | 2 | 426 | 429 | −3 |
| 3. | (Turkey) Bandırma Banvit | 6 | 2 | 4 | 402 | 474 | −72 |
| 4. | (Germany) EWE Baskets | 6 | 1 | 5 | 435 | 488 | −53 |

=== Group B ===
| | Team | Pld | W | L | PF | PA | Diff |
|---|---|---|---|---|---|---|---|
| 1. | (Germany) Göttingen | 6 | 4 | 2 | 478 | 442 | +36 |
| 2. | (Serbia) Hemofarm | 6 | 3 | 3 | 496 | 512 | −16 |
| 3. | (France) ASVEL | 6 | 3 | 3 | 494 | 506 | −12 |
| 4. | (Turkey) Beşiktaş Cola Turka | 6 | 2 | 4 | 516 | 524 | −8 |

=== Group C ===
| | Team | Pld | W | L | PF | PA | Diff |
|---|---|---|---|---|---|---|---|
| 1. | (Spain) Gran Canaria 2014 | 6 | 5 | 1 | 463 | 396 | +67 |
| 2. | (Ukraine) Budivelnyk | 6 | 4 | 2 | 397 | 391 | +6 |
| 3. | (Montenegro) Budućnost | 6 | 3 | 3 | 431 | 418 | +13 |
| 4. | (Lithuania) Šiauliai | 6 | 0 | 6 | 420 | 506 | −86 |

=== Group D ===
| | Team | Pld | W | L | PF | PA | Diff |
|---|---|---|---|---|---|---|---|
| 1. | (Greece) Aris | 6 | 5 | 1 | 514 | 462 | +52 |
| 2. | (Croatia) Cedevita | 6 | 4 | 2 | 484 | 479 | +5 |
| 3. | (Ukraine) Azovmash | 6 | 2 | 4 | 492 | 504 | −12 |
| 4. | (Israel) Hapoel Gilboa Galil | 6 | 1 | 5 | 492 | 537 | −45 |

=== Group E ===
| | Team | Pld | W | L | PF | PA | Diff |
|---|---|---|---|---|---|---|---|
| 1. | (Turkey) Galatasaray Café Crown | 6 | 4 | 2 | 441 | 374 | +67 |
| 2. | (Greece) Panellinios | 6 | 4 | 2 | 366 | 375 | −9 |
| 3. | (Italy) Bennet Cantù | 6 | 3 | 3 | 413 | 398 | +15 |
| 4. | (Netherlands) GasTerra Flames | 6 | 1 | 5 | 365 | 438 | −73 |

=== Group F ===
| | Team | Pld | W | L | PF | PA | Diff |
|---|---|---|---|---|---|---|---|
| 1. | (Italy) Benetton Bwin Treviso | 6 | 6 | 0 | 454 | 414 | +40 |
| 2. | (Spain) Asefa Estudiantes | 6 | 3 | 3 | 483 | 462 | +21 |
| 3. | (Greece) PAOK | 6 | 3 | 3 | 449 | 438 | +11 |
| 4. | (France) Chorale Roanne | 6 | 0 | 6 | 423 | 495 | −72 |

=== Group G ===
| | Team | Pld | W | L | PF | PA | Diff |
|---|---|---|---|---|---|---|---|
| 1. | (Czech Republic) ČEZ Nymburk | 6 | 4 | 2 | 496 | 473 | +23 |
| 2. | (Spain) Cajasol | 6 | 3 | 3 | 494 | 478 | +16 |
| 3. | (Israel) Hapoel Jerusalem | 6 | 3 | 3 | 466 | 463 | +3 |
| 4. | (Latvia) VEF Rīga | 6 | 2 | 4 | 472 | 514 | −42 |

=== Group H ===
| | Team | Pld | W | L | PF | PA | Diff |
|---|---|---|---|---|---|---|---|
| 1. | (Germany) Alba Berlin | 6 | 6 | 0 | 496 | 414 | +82 |
| 2. | (Italy) Pepsi Caserta | 6 | 3 | 3 | 472 | 463 | +9 |
| 3. | (Russia) Krasnye Krylia | 6 | 2 | 4 | 478 | 502 | −24 |
| 4. | (Poland) Anwil Włocławek | 6 | 1 | 5 | 470 | 537 | −67 |

== Top 16 ==
Key to colors
| Top two places in each group advance to Quarterfinals |
| Eliminated |

=== Group I ===
| | Team | Pld | W | L | PF | PA | Diff | Tie-break |
|---|---|---|---|---|---|---|---|---|
| 1. | (Russia) UNICS | 6 | 4 | 2 | 492 | 459 | +33 | 1–1 (+14) |
| 2. | (Croatia) Cedevita | 6 | 4 | 2 | 513 | 531 | −18 | 1–1 (−14) |
| 3. | (Spain) Gran Canaria 2014 | 6 | 2 | 4 | 482 | 484 | −2 | 1–1 (+5) |
| 4. | (Serbia) Hemofarm | 6 | 2 | 4 | 453 | 466 | −13 | 1–1 (−5) |

=== Group J ===
| | Team | Pld | W | L | PF | PA | Diff | Tie-break |
|---|---|---|---|---|---|---|---|---|
| 1. | (Ukraine) Budivelnyk | 6 | 4 | 2 | 417 | 413 | +4 | 2–0 (+17) |
| 2. | (Germany) Göttingen | 6 | 4 | 2 | 433 | 416 | +17 | 0–2 (-17) |
| 3. | (France) Le Mans | 6 | 2 | 4 | 444 | 445 | −1 | 2–0 (+20) |
| 4. | (Greece) Aris | 6 | 2 | 4 | 443 | 463 | −20 | 0–2 (−20) |

=== Group K ===
| | Team | Pld | W | L | PF | PA | Diff | Tie-break |
|---|---|---|---|---|---|---|---|---|
| 1. | (Spain) Asefa Estudiantes | 6 | 5 | 1 | 489 | 459 | +30 | 1–1 (+8) |
| 2. | (Italy) Pepsi Caserta | 6 | 5 | 1 | 474 | 453 | +21 | 1–1 (−8) |
| 3. | (Turkey) Galatasaray Café Crown | 6 | 2 | 4 | 409 | 421 | −12 | |
| 4. | (Czech Republic) ČEZ Nymburk | 6 | 0 | 6 | 451 | 490 | −39 | |

=== Group L ===
| | Team | Pld | W | L | PF | PA | Diff | Tie-break |
|---|---|---|---|---|---|---|---|---|
| 1. | (Italy) Benetton Bwin Treviso | 6 | 5 | 1 | 461 | 426 | +35 | 1–1 (+5) |
| 2. | (Spain) Cajasol | 6 | 5 | 1 | 476 | 440 | +36 | 1–1 (−5) |
| 3. | (Greece) Panellinios | 6 | 1 | 5 | 451 | 477 | −26 | 1–1 (+10) |
| 4. | (Germany) Alba Berlin | 6 | 1 | 5 | 434 | 479 | −45 | 1–1 (−10) |

== Quarterfinals ==
The quarterfinals were two-legged ties determined on aggregate score. The first legs was played on March 23. All return legs were played on March 30. The group winner in each tie, listed as "Team #1", hosted the second leg.

| Team 1 | Agg. | Team 2 | 1st leg | 2nd leg |
|---|---|---|---|---|
| UNICS (Russia) | 169–161 | (Italy) Pepsi Caserta | 90–84 | 79–77 |
| Budivelnyk (Ukraine) | 129–144 | (Spain) Cajasol | 49–67 | 80–77 |
| Asefa Estudiantes (Spain) | 153–171 | (Croatia) Cedevita | 81–90 | 72–81 |
| Benetton Bwin Treviso (Italy) | 150–128 | (Germany) Göttingen | 66–66 | 84–62 |

== Final four ==
Euroleague Basketball Company announced that the 2010-11 Eurocup season would culminate with the Eurocup Finals in Treviso, Italy, on April 16 and 17.

=== Semifinals ===
April 16, Palaverde, Treviso

| Team 1 | Score | Team 2 |
|---|---|---|
| UNICS (Russia) | 87–66 | (Croatia) Cedevita |
| Cajasol (Spain) | 75–63 | (Italy) Benetton Bwin Treviso |

=== 3rd place game ===
April 17, Palaverde, Treviso

| Team 1 | Score | Team 2 |
|---|---|---|
| Cedevita (Croatia) | 59–57 | (Italy) Benetton Bwin Treviso |

=== Final ===
April 17, Palaverde, Treviso

| Team 1 | Score | Team 2 |
|---|---|---|
| UNICS (Russia) | 92–77 | (Spain) Cajasol |

2010–11 Eurocup Champions

UNICS
1st title

=== Final standings ===
| | Team |
|---|---|
| | (Russia) UNICS |
| Silver medal | (Spain) Cajasol |
| Bronze medal | (Croatia) Cedevita |
| | (Italy) Benetton Bwin Treviso |

== Individual statistics ==
=== Points ===
| Rank | Name | Team | Games | Points | PPG |
|---|---|---|---|---|---|
| 1. | (Azerbaijan) Jaycee Carroll | (Spain) Gran Canaria 2014 | 12 | 228 | 19.00 |
| 2. | (United States) Bracey Wright | (Croatia) Cedevita | 10 | 167 | 16.70 |
| 3. | (United States) Chester Simmons | (Czech Republic) ČEZ Nymburk | 12 | 191 | 15.92 |
| 4. | (United States) Devin Smith | (Italy) Benetton Bwin Treviso | 16 | 252 | 15.75 |
| 5. | (United States) Terrell Lyday | (Russia) UNICS | 15 | 235 | 15.67 |

=== Rebounds ===
| Rank | Name | Team | Games | Rebounds | RPG |
|---|---|---|---|---|---|
| 1. | (Poland) Maciej Lampe | (Russia) UNICS | 16 | 129 | 8.06 |
| 2. | (United States) Jumaine Jones | (Italy) Pepsi Caserta | 13 | 100 | 7.69 |
| 3. | (United States) P. J. Tucker | (Greece) Aris | 12 | 86 | 7.17 |
| 4. | (Azerbaijan) Nik Caner-Medley | (Spain) Asefa Estudiantes | 14 | 98 | 7.00 |
| 5. | (United States) Corsley Edwards | (Croatia) Cedevita | 11 | 77 | 7.00 |

=== Assists ===
| Rank | Name | Team | Games | Points | APG |
|---|---|---|---|---|---|
| 1. | (Croatia) Dontaye Draper | (Croatia) Cedevita | 14 | 87 | 6.21 |
| 1. | (Croatia) Marko Popović | (Russia) UNICS | 11 | 64 | 5.82 |
| 3. | (Serbia) Stefan Marković | (Italy) Benetton Bwin Treviso | 16 | 78 | 4.88 |
| 4. | (United States) Trenton Meacham | (Germany) Göttingen | 14 | 65 | 4.64 |
| 5. | (Uruguay) Jayson Granger | (Spain) Asefa Estudiantes | 14 | 60 | 4.29 |

== Awards ==
=== MVP Weekly ===
==== Regular season ====
| Week | Player | Team | PIR |
|---|---|---|---|
| 1. | (United States) P. J. Tucker | (Greece) Aris | 35 |
| 2. | (Greece) Christos Tapoutos | (Greece) Aris | 32 |
| 3. | (United States) Demetrius Alexander | (Ukraine) Azovmash | 36 |
| 4. | (Slovenia) Primož Brezec | (Russia) Krasnye Krylia | 40 |
| 5. | (Nigeria) Ebi Ere | (Italy) Pepsi Caserta | 35 |
| 6. | (Croatia) Dontaye Draper | (Croatia) Cedevita | 36 |

==== Top 16 ====
| Week | Player | Team | PIR |
|---|---|---|---|
| 1. | (United States) Mike Scott | (Germany) Göttingen | 36 |
| 2. | (United States) Paul Davis | (Spain) Cajasol | 31 |
| 3. | (Croatia) Damjan Rudež | (Croatia) Cedevita | 35 |
| 4. | (Croatia) Damjan Rudež (2) (United States) Bracey Wright | (Croatia) Cedevita (Croatia) Cedevita | 28 |
| 5. | (United States) Devin Smith | (Italy) Benetton Bwin Treviso | 47 |
| 6. | (United States) Benjamin Dewar | (France) Le Mans | 29 |

==== Quarterfinals ====
| Game | Player | Team | PIR |
|---|---|---|---|
| 1. | (Belarus) Vladimir Veremeenko | (Russia) UNICS | 40 |
| 2. | (United States) Bracey Wright (2) | (Croatia) Cedevita | 37 |

=== Eurocup MVP ===
- (Croatia) Dontaye Draper (Cedevita)

=== Eurocup Finals MVP ===
- (Croatia) Marko Popović (UNICS)

=== All-Eurocup Team ===
| Position | All-Eurocup First Team | Club Team | All-Eurocup Second Team | Club Team |
|---|---|---|---|---|
| G | (Croatia) Dontaye Draper | (Croatia) Cedevita | (United States) Bracey Wright | (Croatia) Cedevita |
| G | (United States) Terrell Lyday | (Russia) UNICS | (United States) Dwayne Anderson | (Germany) Göttingen |
| F | (United States) Devin Smith | (Italy) Benetton Bwin Treviso | (Russia) Kelly McCarty | (Russia) UNICS |
| F | (France) Tariq Kirksay | (Spain) Cajasol | (Azerbaijan) Nik Caner-Medley | (Spain) Asefa Estudiantes |
| C | (Poland) Maciej Lampe | (Russia) UNICS | (United States) Paul Davis | (Spain) Cajasol |

=== Coach of the Year ===
- (Croatia) Aleksandar Petrović (Cedevita)

=== Rising Star ===
- (Lithuania) Donatas Motiejūnas (Benetton Bwin Treviso)
