= Eurocup Basketball 2010–11 Quarterfinals =

The quarterfinals were two-legged ties determined on aggregate score. The first legs was played on March 23. All return legs were played on March 30. The group winner in each tie, listed as "Team #1", hosted the second leg.

Team #1	Agg.	Team #2	1st leg	2nd leg
UNICS Kazan (Russia)	169–161	(Italy) Pepsi Caserta	90–84	79-77
BC Budivelnyk (Ukraine)	129–144	(Spain) Cajasol	49–67	80-77
Asefa Estudiantes (Spain)	153–171	(Croatia) Cedevita Zagreb	81–90	72-81
Benetton Basket Bwin (Italy)	150–128	(Germany) BG Göttingen	66–66	84-62

== Game 1 ==
23 March 2011
18:00

Report

Cedevita Zagreb (Croatia)	90–81	(Spain) Asefa Estudiantes
Scoring by quarter: 21–33, 26–16, 29–12, 14–20
Pts: Rudež 21; Rebs: Petrović 8 Asts: Draper 5		Pts: Caner-Medley 19; Rebs: Caner-Medley 11; Asts: Granger 4

Dražen Petrović Basketball Hall, Zagreb
Attendance: 5,200
Referees: Paolo Taurino (ITA), Eddie Viator (FRA), Damir Javor (SLO)

23 March 2011
19:30

Report

BG Göttingen (Germany)	66–66	(Italy) Benetton Basket Bwin
Scoring by quarter: 21–15, 20–17, 9–19, 16–15
Pts: Scott 15; Rebs: Scott 8 Asts: Meacham 3		Pts: Gentile 22; Rebs: Brunner 10; Asts: Marković 6

Lokhalle, Göttingen
Attendance: 3,250
Referees: Jose Ramon Garcia Ortiz (ESP), Luis Lopes (POR), Oscar Perea (ESP)

23 March 2011
20:00

Report

Pepsi Caserta (Italy)	84–90	(Russia) UNICS Kazan
Scoring by quarter: 18–22, 26–24, 16–15, 24–29
Pts: Williams 22; Rebs: Jones 9 Asts: Bowers 4		Pts: Veremeenko 30; Rebs: Veremeenko 12; Asts: Popović 6

PalaMaggiò, Caserta
Attendance: 4,963
Referees: Spiros Gkontas (GRE), Robert Vyklicky (CZE), Radomir Vojinovic (MNE)

23 March 2011
20:00

Report

Cajasol (Spain)	67–49	(Ukraine) BC Budivelnyk
Scoring by quarter: 14–16, 16–8, 13–13, 24–12
Pts: Urtasun 15; Rebs: Kirksay 8 Asts: Urtasun, Bullock 3		Pts: Keys, Wilson 11; Rebs: Wilson 6 Asts: Anisimov 3

Palacio Municipal San Pablo, Seville
Attendance: 7,500
Referees: Fabio Facchini (ITA), Gianluca Mattioli (ITA), Joseph Bissang (FRA)

== Game 2 ==
30 March 2011
18:30

Report

UNICS Kazan (Russia)	79–77	(Italy) Pepsi Caserta
Scoring by quarter: 26–17, 20–18, 17–24, 16–18
Pts: Lampe 31; Rebs: Lampe 16; Asts: Popović 6		Pts: Jones 23; Rebs: Jones 10; Asts: Di Bella 6

Basket Hall Arena, Kazan
Attendance: 2,500
Referees: Jakub Zamojski (POL), Murat Biricik (TUR), Tomas Jasevicius (LTU)

30 March 2011
18:30

Report

BC Budivelnyk (Ukraine)	80–77	(Spain) Cajasol
Scoring by quarter: 23–22, 17–17, 14–17, 26–21
Pts: Ikovlev, Spencer 12; Rebs: Betts 10; Asts: Keys 4		Pts: Urtasun 15; Rebs: Triguero 8 Asts: Bullock, Ivanov 3

Palace of Sports, Kyiv
Attendance: 3,450
Referees: Sreten Radovic (CRO), Milivoje Jovcic (SRB), Sergey Mikhaylov (RUS)

30 March 2011
20:30

Report

Asefa Estudiantes (Spain)	72–81	(Croatia) Cedevita Zagreb
Scoring by quarter: 25–26, 17–15, 15–19, 15–21
Pts: Gabriel, Jasen 12; Rebs: Caner-Medley 12; Asts: Granger 3		Pts: Wright 24; Rebs: Wright 11; Asts: Draper 5

Palacio Vistalegre, Madrid
Attendance: 14,000
Referees: Recep Ankarali (TUR), Paolo Taurino (ITA), Carmelo Paternico (ITA)

30 March 2011
20:30

Report

Benetton Basket Bwin (Italy)	84–62	(Germany) BG Göttingen
Scoring by quarter: 25–20, 20–17, 20–13, 19–12
Pts: Smith 22; Rebs: Perić 8 Asts: Marković 10		Pts: Anderson 25; Rebs: Anderson 7 Asts: Five players 1

Palaverde, Treviso
Attendance: 3,816
Referees: Dubravko Muhvic (CRO), Juan Carlos Garcia Gonzalez (ESP), Nicola Maestre (FRA)
