= 2013–14 Euroleague Top 16 Group E =

Standings and Results for Group E of the Top 16 phase of the 2013–14 Turkish Airlines Euroleague basketball tournament.

== Standings ==
Key to colors
Top four places in each group advance to Playoffs

Pos	Team	Pld	W	L	PF	PA	PD
1	(Spain) FC Barcelona	14	12	2	1109	1009	+100
2	(Italy) EA7 Milano	14	10	4	1093	1011	+82
3	(Greece) Olympiacos	14	8	6	1058	996	+62
4	(Greece) Panathinaikos	14	7	7	961	958	+3
5	(Spain) Unicaja	14	6	8	1032	1063	−31
6	(Turkey) Fenerbahçe Ülker	14	6	8	1078	1101	−23
7	(Spain) Laboral Kutxa	14	5	9	1061	1125	−64
8	(Turkey) Anadolu Efes	14	2	12	967	1096	−129

Tiebreakers

- Unicaja and Fenerbahçe are ranked on head-to-head point differential.

	Team	Pld	W	L	PF	PA	Diff
1.	(Spain) Unicaja	2	1	1	156	144	+12
2.	(Turkey) Fenerbahçe Ülker	2	1	1	144	156	–12

== Fixtures and results ==
All times given below are in Central European Time.

=== Game 1 ===
2 January 2014
19:00

Boxscore

Unicaja (Spain)	79–93	(Spain) Laboral Kutxa
Scoring by quarter: 24–13, 11–20, 21–30, 23–30
Pts: Dragić 22; Rebs: Caner-Medley 9 Asts: Caner-Medley 3		Pts: Nocioni 20; Rebs: Nocioni 9 Asts: Heurtel 8

Palacio de Deportes, Málaga
Attendance: 4,500
Referees: Tolga Sahin (ITA), Matej Boltauzer (SLO), Sergiy Zashchuk (UKR)

2 January 2014
20:30

Boxscore

Panathinaikos (Greece)	73–57	(Italy) Emporio Armani Milano
Scoring by quarter: 20–14, 18–17, 14–9, 21–17
Pts: Gist 12; Rebs: Lasme 13; Asts: Diamantidis 11		Pts: Gentile 14; Rebs: Lawal 6 Asts: Hackett, Kangur 2

O.A.C.A., Athens
Attendance: 14,000
Referees: Jose Ramon Garcia Ortiz (ESP), Marek Cmikiewicz (POL), Olegs Latisevs (LAT)

2 January 2014
20:45

Boxscore

FC Barcelona (Spain)	84–65	(Turkey) Anadolu Efes
Scoring by quarter: 25–16, 27–13, 13–20, 19–16
Pts: Navarro 21; Rebs: Dorsey 11; Asts: Sada 4		Pts: Erden 15; Rebs: Balbay 5 Asts: Planinić 4

Palau Blaugrana, Barcelona
Attendance: 4,588
Referees: Ilija Belosevic (SRB), Jakub Zamojski (POL), Marko Juras (SRB)

3 January 2014
20:30

Boxscore

Olympiacos (Greece)	95–82	(Turkey) Fenerbahçe Ülker
Scoring by quarter: 27–19, 20–21, 15–16, 33–26
Pts: Spanoulis 28; Rebs: Perperoglou, Spanoulis 5 Asts: Spanoulis 9		Pts: Preldžič 17; Rebs: Bjelica, Preldžič 6 Asts: Preldžič 5

Peace and Friendship Stadium, Piraeus
Attendance: 11,244
Referees: Danie Hierrezuelo (ESP), Fernando Rocha (POR), Carmelo Paternico (ITA)

=== Game 2 ===
9 January 2014
19:00

Boxscore

Fenerbahçe Ülker (Turkey)	73–76	(Spain) FC Barcelona
Scoring by quarter: 18–23, 21–16, 17–19, 17–18
Pts: Bjelica, Mahmutoğlu 15; Rebs: Bjelica 7 Asts: Kleiza 3		Pts: Huertas 23; Rebs: Papanikolaou 7 Asts: Huertas 7

Ülker Sports Arena, Istanbul
Attendance: 12,968
Referees: Luigi Lamonica (ITA), Eddie Viator (FRA), Olegs Latisevs (LAT)

9 January 2014
20:45

Boxscore

Emporio Armani Milano (Italy)	81–51	(Greece) Olympiacos
Scoring by quarter: 16–21, 23–11, 24–8, 18–11
Pts: Langford 29; Rebs: Lawal 9 Asts: Hackett, Jerrells 3		Pts: Printezis 12; Rebs: Printezis, Simmons 6 Asts: Spanoulis 6

Mediolanum Forum, Milan
Attendance: 6,796
Referees: Juan Carlos Arteaga (ESP), Matej Boltauzer (SLO), Antonio Conde (ESP)

10 January 2014
19:00

Boxscore

Anadolu Efes (Turkey)	72–74	(Spain) Unicaja
Scoring by quarter: 17–20, 19–17, 23–17, 13–20
Pts: Hopson 15; Rebs: Savanović 6 Asts: three players 3		Pts: Dragić 17; Rebs: Dragić, Vázquez 6 Asts: Vidal 3

Abdi İpekçi Arena, Istanbul
Attendance: 3,590
Referees: Guerrino Cerebuch (ITA), Srdan Dozai (CRO), Paolo Taurino (ITA)

10 January 2014
20:30

Boxscore

Laboral Kutxa (Spain)	64–72	(Greece) Panathinaikos
Scoring by quarter: 17–24, 15–10, 20–14, 12–24
Pts: Pleiß 17; Rebs: Nocioni 10; Asts: Heurtel 6		Pts: Lasme 20; Rebs: Fotsis 6 Asts: Diamantidis 9

Fernando Buesa Arena, Vitoria-Gasteiz
Attendance: 10,120
Referees: Borys Rtzhyk (UKR), Robert Lottermoser (GER), Damir Javor (SLO)

=== Game 3 ===
16 January 2014
20:00

Boxscore

Olympiacos (Greece)	72–81	(Spain) FC Barcelona
Scoring by quarter: 23–18, 11–14, 14–23, 24–26
Pts: Printezis, Spanoulis 17; Rebs: Lojeski 7 Asts: Spanoulis 5		Pts: Navarro 21; Rebs: Dorsey 6 Asts: Papanikolaou, Sada 4

Peace and Friendship Stadium, Piraeus
Attendance: 11,500
Referees: Borys Ryzhyk (UKR), Robert Lottermoser (GER), Rustu Nuran (TUR)

17 January 2014
19:00

Boxscore

Unicaja (Spain)	89–75	(Turkey) Fenerbahçe Ülker
Scoring by quarter: 19–19, 18–20, 25–27, 27–9
Pts: Dragić 24; Rebs: Štimac 8 Asts: Calloway 6		Pts: Mahmutoğlu 19; Rebs: Vidmar 7 Asts: McCalebb 8

Palacio de Deportes, Málaga
Attendance: 5,700
Referees: Christos Christodoulou (GRE), Boris Shulga (UKR), Joseph Bisssang (FRA)

17 January 2014
20:30

Boxscore

Emporio Armani Milano (Italy)	83–76	(Spain) Laboral Kutxa
Scoring by quarter: 26–18, 22–20, 15–12, 20–26
Pts: Jerrells, Langford 16; Rebs: three players 6 Asts: Melli 3		Pts: Nocioni 18; Rebs: Nocioni 5 Asts: Heurtel 6

Mediolanum Forum, Milan
Attendance: 7,267
Referees: Ilija Belosevic (SRB), Spiros Gkontas (GRE), Murat Biricik (TUR)

17 January 2014
20:45

Boxscore

Panathinaikos (Greece)	78–64	(Turkey) Anadolu Efes
Scoring by quarter: 23–21, 14–15, 23–18, 18–10
Pts: Diamantidis 17; Rebs: Fotsis, Lasme 8 Asts: Diamantidis 9		Pts: Planinić 13; Rebs: Erden 5 Asts: Gordon 5

O.A.C.A., Athens
Attendance: 9,500
Referees: Milivoje Jovcic (SRB), Miguel Perez Perez (ESP), Petar Obradovic (BIH)

=== Game 4 ===
23 January 2014
19:00

Boxscore

Fenerbahçe Ülker (Turkey)	77–72	(Greece) Panathinaikos
Scoring by quarter: 23–11, 16–17, 17–22, 21–22
Pts: Bogdanović 15; Rebs: McCalebb 7 Asts: Bogdanović 3		Pts: Curry 14; Rebs: Gist 10; Asts: Diamantidis 8

Ülker Sports Arena, Istanbul
Attendance: 12,526
Referees: Sreten Radovic (CRO), Emilio Perez Pizarro (ESP), Roberto Chiari (ITA)

23 January 2014
20:45

Boxscore

FC Barcelona (Spain)	83–79	(Spain) Unicaja
Scoring by quarter: 25–24, 19–18, 22–26, 17–11
Pts: Nachbar 13; Rebs: Lorbek 5 Asts: Huertas 6		Pts: Suárez 15; Rebs: Caner-Medley 4 Asts: Granger 6

Palau Blaugrana, Barcelona
Attendance: 4,521
Referees: Recep Ankarali (TUR), Grzegorz Ziemblicki (POL), Panagiotis Anastopoulos (GRE)

24 January 2014
19:15

Boxscore

Anadolu Efes (Turkey)	61–60	(Italy) Emporio Armani Milano
Scoring by quarter: 14–17, 16–17, 13–11, 18–15
Pts: Savanović 13; Rebs: Gönlüm 14; Asts: Gordon 5		Pts: Langford 18; Rebs: Melli 6 Asts: three players 2

Abdi Ipekci Arena, Istanbul
Attendance: 3,744
Referees: José Martín (ESP), Joseph Bissang (FRA), Carlos Cortes (ESP)

24 January 2014
20:30

Boxscore

Laboral Kutxa (Spain)	70–89	(Greece) Olympiacos
Scoring by quarter: 15–26, 23–33, 15–19, 17–11
Pts: Heurtel, Jelínek 12; Rebs: Mainoldi, Diop 7 Asts: Heurtel 6		Pts: Lojeski 17; Rebs: Printezis 7 Asts: Spanoulis 7

Fernando Buesa Arena, Vitoria-Gasteiz
Attendance: 12,743
Referees: Guerrino Cerebuch (ITA), Milivoje Jovcic (SRB), Sasa Maricic (SRB)

=== Game 5 ===
30 January 2014
20:00

Boxscore

Olympiacos (Greece)	73–55	(Spain) Unicaja
Scoring by quarter: 17–17, 20–14, 18–10, 18–14
Pts: Printezis 16; Rebs: Printezis, Dunston 6 Asts: Lojeski, Spanoulis 3		Pts: Caner-Medley 11; Rebs: Štimac 14; Asts: three players 3

Peace and Friendship Stadium, Piraeus
Attendance: 10,130
Referees: Ilija Belosevic (SRB), Jakub Zamojski (POL), Petar Obradovic (BIH)

30 January 2014
20:30

Boxscore

Emporio Armani Milano (Italy)	90–85	(Turkey) Fenerbahçe Ülker
Scoring by quarter: 18–25, 31–15, 15–18, 26–27
Pts: Hackett 17; Rebs: Hackett 7 Asts: Langford 5		Pts: Kleiza 26; Rebs: Preldžič 6 Asts: Preldžič 4

Mediolanum Forum, Milan
Attendance: 10,161
Referees: Boris Ryzhyk (UKR), Juan Carlos Garcia Gonzalez (ESP), Damir Javor (SLO)

31 January 2014
20:30

Boxscore

Panathinaikos (Greece)	56–63	(Spain) FC Barcelona
Scoring by quarter: 23–24, 9–20, 15–8, 9–11
Pts: Lasme, Diamantidis 13; Rebs: Lasme 8 Asts: Diamantidis 5		Pts: Huertas 17; Rebs: Nachbar, Dorsey 5 Asts: Navarro 3

O.A.C.A., Athens
Attendance: 18,500
Referees: Guerrino Cerebuch (ITA), Tolga Sahin (ITA), Matej Boltauzer (SLO)

31 January 2014
20:45

Boxscore

Laboral Kutxa (Spain)	66–72	(Turkey) Anadolu Efes
Scoring by quarter: 27–20, 7–17, 16–26, 16–9
Pts: Pleiß 14; Rebs: Nocioni 8 Asts: Heurtel 4		Pts: Bjelica, Vasileiadis 15; Rebs: Savanović 9 Asts: Savanović 5

Fernando Buesa Arena, Vitoria-Gasteiz
Attendance: 9,324
Referees: Luigi Lamonica (ITA), Carmelo Paternico (ITA), Petros Papapetrou (GRE)

=== Game 6 ===
13 February 2014
19:00

Boxscore

Olympiacos (Greece)	78–60	(Turkey) Anadolu Efes
Scoring by quarter: 24–12, 12–17, 26–14, 16–17
Pts: Spanoulis 16; Rebs: Petway 6 Asts: Lojeski 4		Pts: Planinić 13; Rebs: Bjelica, Planinić 5 Asts: Planinić 7

Peace and Friendship Stadium, Piraeus
Attendance: 10,100
Referees: Juan Carlos Arteaga (ESP), Emilio Perez Pizarro (ESP), Marko Juras (SRB)

13 February 2014
20:45

Boxscore

Fenerbahçe Ülker (Turkey)	98–64	(Spain) Laboral Kutxa
Scoring by quarter: 30–24, 29–14, 23–17, 16–9
Pts: Bogdanović 17; Rebs: Bjelica 9 Asts: Preldžić 7		Pts: Pleiß 14; Rebs: Hanga 5 Asts: Hodge 5

Ülker Sports Arena, Istanbul
Attendance: 8,670
Referees: Robert Lottermoser (GER), Jakub Zamojski (POL), Panagiotis Anastopoulos (GRE)

13 February 2014
20:45

Boxscore

Unicaja (Spain)	87–71	(Greece) Panathinaikos
Scoring by quarter: 20–23, 24–19, 17–15, 26–14
Pts: Caner-Medley 21; Rebs: Štimac 7 Asts: five players 3		Pts: Curry 14; Rebs: Lasme 4 Asts: three players 5

Palacio de Deportes, Málaga
Attendance: 6,500
Referees: Luigi Lamonica (ITA), Srdan Dozai (CRO), Damir Javor (SLO)

14 February 2014
20:45

Boxscore

FC Barcelona (Spain)	80–70	(Italy) Emporio Armani Milano
Scoring by quarter: 12–15, 23–22, 14–15, 31–18
Pts: Oleson 17; Rebs: Dorsey, Nachbar 6 Asts: Huertas 4		Pts: Langford 18; Rebs: three players 6 Asts: Hackett 3

Palau Blaugrana, Barcelona
Attendance: 5,403
Referees: Christos Christodoulou (GRE), Sergiy Zashchuk (UKR), Milija Vojinovic (SRB)

=== Game 7 ===
20 February 2014
20:30

Boxscore

Laboral Kutxa (Spain)	68–80	(Spain) FC Barcelona
Scoring by quarter: 17–27, 14–6, 18–26, 19–21
Pts: San Emeterio 22; Rebs: Pleiß 10; Asts: Heurtel, Hodge 4		Pts: Tomić 24; Rebs: Tomić 9 Asts: Navarro 5

Fernando Buesa Arena, Vitoria-Gasteiz
Attendance: 10,186
Referees: Ilija Belosevic (SRB), Sreten Radovic (CRO), Elias Koromilas (GRE)

20 February 2014
20:30

Boxscore

Emporio Armani Milano (Italy)	70–59	(Spain) Unicaja
Scoring by quarter: 22–17, 16–10, 19–13, 13–19
Pts: Langford 29; Rebs: Samuels 7 Asts: Moss 3		Pts: Caner-Medley 18; Rebs: Štimac 11; Asts: Suárez, Štimac 2

PalaDesio, Desio
Attendance: 6,956
Referees: Sasa Pukl (SLO), Marek Cmikiewicz (POL), Olegs Latisevs (LAT)

20 February 2014
20:45

Boxscore

Panathinaikos (Greece)	66–62	(Greece) Olympiacos
Scoring by quarter: 19–18, 16–15, 12–14, 19–15
Pts: Lasme 18; Rebs: Fotsis 6 Asts: Diamantidis 8		Pts: Perperoglou 12; Rebs: Dunston, Simmons, Mantzaris 6 Asts: Lojeski 4

O.A.C.A., Athens
Attendance: 17,500
Referees: Borys Ryzhyk (UKR), Dani Hierrezuelo (ESP), Fernando Rocha (POR)

21 February 2014
19:15

Boxscore

Anadolu Efes (Turkey)	63–71	(Turkey) Fenerbahçe Ülker
Scoring by quarter: 24–24, 15–17, 14–13, 10–17
Pts: Savanović 15; Rebs: Gönlüm, Bjelica 4 Asts: Gordon 8		Pts: Bogdanović 17; Rebs: Preldžič 7 Asts: Preldžič 6

Abdi İpekçi Arena, Istanbul
Attendance: 8,078
Referees: Guerrino Cerebuch (ITA), Jose Ramon Garcia Ortiz (ESP), Boris Shulga (UKR)

=== Game 8 ===
27 February 2014
19:00

Boxscore

Anadolu Efes (Turkey)	84–89 (OT)	(Spain) FC Barcelona
Scoring by quarter: 17–22, 9–16, 22–15, 27–22, Overtime: 9–14
Pts: Vasileiadis, Planinić 14; Rebs: Gönlüm 7 Asts: Planinić 9		Pts: Tomić 26; Rebs: Tomić 15; Asts: Navarro 11

Abdi Ipekci Arena, Istanbul
Attendance: 7,136
Referees: Milivoje Jovcic (SRB), Borys Ryzhyk (UKR), Petar Obradovic (BIH)

27 February 2014
20:45

Boxscore

Laboral Kutxa (Spain)	71–81	(Spain) Unicaja
Scoring by quarter: 16–26, 8–21, 26–13, 21–21
Pts: Nocioni 18; Rebs: Nocioni 7 Asts: Heurtel 8		Pts: Toolson 14; Rebs: Štimac 10; Asts: Granger, Urtasun 3

Fernando Buesa Arena, Vitoria-Gasteiz
Attendance: 10,350
Referees: Fernando Rocha (POR), Spiros Gkontas (GRE), Rustu Nuran (TUR)

27 February 2014
20:45

Boxscore

Emporio Armani Milano (Italy)	77–75	(Greece) Panathinaikos
Scoring by quarter: 19–13, 22–13, 18–23, 18–26
Pts: Langford 18; Rebs: Melli 5 Asts: Langford 5		Pts: Gist 21; Rebs: Gist 9 Asts: Bramos, Wright 3

Mediolanum Forum, Milan
Attendance: 10,904
Referees: Recep Ankarali (TUR), Grzegorz Ziemblicki (POL), Vicente Bulto (ESP)

28 February 2014
19:00

Boxscore

Fenerbahçe Ülker (Turkey)	78–74	(Greece) Olympiacos
Scoring by quarter: 21-22, 20-16, 18-13, 19-23
Pts: Kleiza 21; Rebs: Bjelica, Kleiza 8 Asts: three players 3		Pts: Perperoglou, Sloukas 17; Rebs: Dunston 7 Asts: Sloukas 4

Ulker Sports Arena, Istanbul
Attendance: 12,917
Referees: José Martín (ESP), Antonio Conde (ESP), Marek Cmikiewicz (POL)

=== Game 9 ===
6 March 2014
20:00

Boxscore

Olympiacos (Greece)	86–88	(Italy) Emporio Armani Milano
Scoring by quarter: 29–23, 18–27, 16–16, 23–23
Pts: Perperoglou 22; Rebs: Printezis 9 Asts: Mantzaris 5		Pts: Langford 20; Rebs: Lawal 8 Asts: Langford 8

Peace and Friendship Stadium, Piraeus
Attendance: 9,800
Referees: Milivoje Jovcic (SRB), Eddie Viator (FRA), Benjamin Jimenez (ESP)

6 March 2014
20:45

Boxscore

FC Barcelona (Spain)	93–73	(Turkey) Fenerbahçe Ülker
Scoring by quarter: 18–19, 27–19, 19–10, 29–25
Pts: Tomić 19; Rebs: Dorsey 6 Asts: Navarro 5		Pts: Bjelica 15; Rebs: Bjelica 10; Asts: Preldžič 4

Palau Blaugrana, Barcelona
Attendance: 5,858
Referees: Fernando Rocha (POR), Spiros Gkontas (GRE), Matej Boltauzer (SLO)

7 March 2014
20:45

Boxscore

Panathinaikos (Greece)	61–68	(Spain) Laboral Kutxa
Scoring by quarter: 18–18, 9–10, 17–27, 17–13
Pts: Diamantidis 15; Rebs: Lasme 7 Asts: Gist 5		Pts: Nocioni 16; Rebs: Nocioni 13; Asts: San Emeterio 6

O.A.C.A., Athens
Attendance: 9,000
Referees: Sasa Pukl (SLO), Tolga Sahin (ITA), Marcin Kowalski (POL)

7 March 2014
20:45

Boxscore

Unicaja (Spain)	83–75	(Turkey) Anadolu Efes
Scoring by quarter: 29–11, 13–23, 21–18, 20–23
Pts: Dragić 24; Rebs: Vázquez 10; Asts: Caner-Medley, Dragić 3		Pts: Vasileiadis 15; Rebs: Savanović, Gönlüm 6 Asts: Planinić 6

Palacio de Deportes, Málaga
Attendance: 5,900
Referees: Sreten Radovic (CRO), Robert Lottermoser (GER), Elias Koromilas (GRE)

=== Game 10 ===
13 March 2014
19:00

Boxscore

Fenerbahçe Ülker (Turkey)	69–67	(Spain) Unicaja
Scoring by quarter: 14–11, 19–19, 13–19, 23–18
Pts: Bjelica, McCalebb 13; Rebs: Bjelica 9 Asts: Bogdanović 3		Pts: Kuzminskas 13; Rebs: three players 6 Asts: Granger 9

Ülker Sports Arena, Istanbul
Attendance: 11,302
Referees: Luigi Lamonica (ITA), Srdan Dozai (CRO), Marcin Kowalski (POL)

13 March 2014
21:00

Boxscore

Laboral Kutxa (Spain)	65–83	(Italy) Emporio Armani Milano
Scoring by quarter: 19–25, 17–25, 19–17, 10–16
Pts: Pleiß 30; Rebs: Pleiß 13; Asts: Heurtel 5		Pts: Jerrells 17; Rebs: Moss 8 Asts: Hackett 5

Fernando Buesa Arena, Vitoria-Gasteiz
Attendance: 8,246
Referees: Borys Ryzhyk (UKR), Robert Lottermoser (GER), Sinisa Herceg (CRO)

14 March 2014
19:00

Boxscore

Anadolu Efes (Turkey)	60–65 (OT)	(Greece) Panathinaikos
Scoring by quarter: 10–11, 16–17, 16–16, 12–10, Overtime: 6–11
Pts: Planinić 15; Rebs: Planinić, Gönlüm 7 Asts: Gordon 4		Pts: Fotsis 14; Rebs: Lasme 12; Asts: Diamantidis, Wright 4

Abdi İpekçi Arena, Istanbul
Attendance: 5,282
Referees: Juan Carlos Garcia Gonzalez (ESP), Matej Boltauzer (SLO), Eddie Viator (FRA)

14 March 2014
21:00

Boxscore

FC Barcelona (Spain)	70–58	(Greece) Olympiacos
Scoring by quarter: 18-13, 15-14, 22-17, 15-14
Pts: Oleson 15; Rebs: Tomić 11; Asts: Huertas 5		Pts: Dunston 18; Rebs: Mantzaris 8 Asts: Mantzaris 5

Palau Blaugrana, Barcelona
Attendance: 6,938
Referees: Guerrino Cerebuch (ITA), Recep Ankarali (TUR), Nicola Maestre (FRA)

=== Game 11 ===
20 March 2014
20:45

Boxscore

Panathinaikos (Greece)	76–67	(Turkey) Fenerbahçe Ülker
Scoring by quarter: 16–19, 25–18, 17–12, 18–18
Pts: Bramos 23; Rebs: Fotsis 9 Asts: Diamantidis 6		Pts: Preldžić 13; Rebs: Bjelica 7 Asts: Preldžić 6

Olympic Indoor Hall, Athens
Attendance: 17,500
Referees: Jose Ramon Garcia Ortiz (ESP), Carmelo Paternico (ITA), Olegs Latisevs (LAT)

21 March 2014
20:30

Boxscore

Olympiacos (Greece)	89–59	(Spain) Laboral Kutxa
Scoring by quarter: 23–20, 22–7, 22–19, 22–13
Pts: Lojeski 16; Rebs: Petway, Mantzaris 8 Asts: Mantzaris 9		Pts: Mainoldi 12; Rebs: Mainoldi 5 Asts: San Emeterio, Heurtel 7

Peace and Friendship Stadium, Piraeus
Attendance: 7,500
Referees: Luigi Lamonica (ITA), Matej Boltauzer (SLO), Joseph Bissang (FRA)

21 March 2014
20:45

Boxscore

Unicaja (Spain)	61–77	(Spain) FC Barcelona
Scoring by quarter: 17–21, 14–16, 16–18, 14–22
Pts: Calloway 15; Rebs: four players 4 Asts: Calloway, Granger 3		Pts: Nachbar 16; Rebs: Tomić 10; Asts: Navarro, Sada 4

Palacio de Deportes, Málaga
Attendance: 10,600
Referees: Christos Christodoulou (GRE), Jakub Zamojski (POL), Eddie Viator (FRA)

21 March 2014
21:00

Boxscore

Emporio Armani Milano (Italy)	76–69	(Turkey) Anadolu Efes
Scoring by quarter: 19–19, 18–20, 12–14, 27–16
Pts: Jerrells 17; Rebs: Samuels 12; Asts: Gentile 4		Pts: Bjelica 16; Rebs: Gönlüm 7 Asts: Gordon 8

Mediolanum Forum, Milan
Attendance: 10,211
Referees: Fernando Rocha (POR), Antonio Conde (ESP), Marek Cmikiewicz (POL)

=== Game 12 ===
27 March 2014
19:45

Boxscore

Anadolu Efes (Turkey)	79–105	(Spain) Laboral Kutxa
Scoring by quarter: 26–31, 16–24, 17–18, 20–32
Pts: Gönlüm 13; Rebs: Gönlüm 6 Asts: Gordon 9		Pts: Pleiß 20; Rebs: Pleiß 7 Asts: Heurtel 5

Abdi İpekçi Arena, Istanbul
Attendance: 3,226
Referees: Milivoje Jovcic (SRB), Boris Shulga (UKR), Petros Papapetrou (GRE)

27 March 2014
20:45

Boxscore

Unicaja (Spain)	63–80	(Greece) Olympiacos
Scoring by quarter: 18–28, 16–13, 16–22, 13–17
Pts: Urtasun 13; Rebs: Suárez, Vázquez 5 Asts: Calloway 4		Pts: Spanoulis 20; Rebs: Petway 7 Asts: Mantzaris 9

Palacio de Deportes, Málaga
Attendance: 6,492
Referees: Sasa Pukl (SLO), Tolga Sahin (ITA), Milija Vojinovic (SRB)

28 March 2014
19:30

Boxscore

Fenerbahçe Ülker (Turkey)	73–82	(Italy) Emporio Armani Milano
Scoring by quarter: 15–14, 14–24, 25–30, 19–14
Pts: Bogdanović 24; Rebs: Bjelica 10; Asts: Bjelica 3		Pts: Moss 15; Rebs: Lawal, Gentile 7 Asts: Gentile, Hackett 4

Ülker Sports Arena, Istanbul
Attendance: 12,263
Referees: Juan Carlos Arteaga (ESP), Juan Carlos Garcia Gonzalez (ESP), Nicola Maestre (FRA)

28 March 2014
20:45

Boxscore

FC Barcelona (Spain)	84–62	(Greece) Panathinaikos
Scoring by quarter: 14-15, 28-17, 22-14, 20-16
Pts: Lorbek, Abrines 15; Rebs: Tomić 9 Asts: Sada 5		Pts: Ukić 13; Rebs: Mačiulis 6 Asts: Diamantidis 4

Palau Blaugrana, Barcelona
Attendance: 5,803
Referees: Borys Ryzhyk (UKR), Grzegorz Ziemblicki (POL), Marek Cmikiewicz (POL)

=== Game 13 ===
2 April 2014
20:00

Boxscore

Emporio Armani Milano (Italy)	91–63	(Spain) FC Barcelona
Scoring by quarter: 21–20, 22–14, 26–6, 22–23
Pts: Gentile 24; Rebs: Gentile 7 Asts: Gentile 6		Pts: Abrines 12; Rebs: Dorsey 11; Asts: Huertas, Pullen 3

Mediolanum Forum, Milan
Attendance: 12,331
Referees: Sreten Radovic (CRO), Matej Botauzer (SLO), Olegs Latisevs (LAT)

3 April 2014
20:30

Boxscore

Panathinaikos (Greece)	69–60	(Spain) Unicaja
Scoring by quarter: 19–12, 14–16, 22–13, 14–19
Pts: Diamantidis 13; Rebs: Mačiulis 5 Asts: Diamantidis 6		Pts: Štimac 12; Rebs: three players 5 Asts: Dragić

O.A.C.A., Athens
Attendance: 13,200
Referees: Ilija Belosevic (SRB), Fernando Rocha (POR), Damir Javor (SLO)

3 April 2014
20:30

Boxscore

Laboral Kutxa (Spain)	95–73	(Turkey) Fenerbahçe Ülker
Scoring by quarter: 20–18, 27–20, 31–16, 17–19
Pts: Nocioni, Pleiß 15; Rebs: Pleiß 10; Asts: Heurtel 10		Pts: McCalebb 19; Rebs: Kleiza 11; Asts: Preldžič 4

Fernando Buesa Arena, Vitoria-Gasteiz
Attendance: 11,284
Referees: Sasa Pukl (SLO), Paolo Taurino (ITA), Sergiy Zashchuk (UKR)

4 April 2014
20:00

Boxscore

Anadolu Efes (Turkey)	78–83	(Greece) Olympiacos
Scoring by quarter: 18–20, 14–24, 28–24, 18–16
Pts: Vasileiadis, Gordon 16; Rebs: Gordon, Gönlüm 5 Asts: Gordon 9		Pts: Spanoulis 17; Rebs: Dunston 7 Asts: Collins 5

Abdi İpekçi Arena, Istanbul
Attendance: 4,140
Referees: Dani Hierrezuelo (ESP), Jakub Zamojski (POL), Sasa Maricic (SRB)

=== Game 14 ===
10 April 2014
19:00

Boxscore

Fenerbahçe Ülker (Turkey)	84–65	(Turkey) Anadolu Efes
Scoring by quarter: 21-10, 24-21, 23-18, 16-16
Pts: Žorić 20; Rebs: Savaş 7 Asts: Uğurlu 7		Pts: Savanović 21; Rebs: Gönlüm 7 Asts: Osman, Savanović 4

Ülker Sports Arena, Istanbul
Attendance: 3,230
Referees: Ilija Belosevic (SRB), Elias Koromilas (GRE), Marcin Kowalski (POL)

10 April 2014
20:45

Boxscore

FC Barcelona (Spain)	86–97	(Spain) Laboral Kutxa
Scoring by quarter: 28–22, 22–13, 10–31, 26–31
Pts: Navarro 25; Rebs: Dorsey 6 Asts: Navarro, Huertas 5		Pts: Nocioni 37; Rebs: Pleiß 6 Asts: Heurtel 7

Palau Blaugrana, Barcelona
Attendance: 4,050
Referees: Tolga Sahin (ITA), Murat Biricik (TUR), Damir Javor (SLO)

10 April 2014
20:45

Boxscore

Olympiacos (Greece)	68–65	(Greece) Panathinaikos
Scoring by quarter: 12–16, 17–21, 17–11, 22–17
Pts: Dunston, Sloukas 12; Rebs: Mantzaris 9 Asts: Sloukas, Mantzaris 5		Pts: Mavrokefalidis 17; Rebs: Gist 6 Asts: Diamantidis 4

Peace and Friendship Stadium, Piraeus
Attendance: 11,500
Referees: Luigi Lamonica (ITA), Milivoje Jovcic (SRB), Robert Lottermoser (GER)

11 April 2014
20:45

Boxscore

Unicaja (Spain)	95–85	(Italy) Emporio Armani Milano
Scoring by quarter: 22–18, 26–23, 29–16, 18–28
Pts: Štimac 16; Rebs: Kuzminskas 9 Asts: Granger 7		Pts: Langford 22; Rebs: Moss 5 Asts: Hackett 5

Palacio de Deportes José María Martín Carpena, Málaga
Attendance: 3,512
Referees: Borys Ryzhyk (UKR), Srdan Dozai (SRB), Sasa Maricic (CRO)
