= Babacar Camara =

Senegalese professional basketball player

No. 9 – Titánicos de León
- Position: Center
- League: LNBP

Personal information
- Born: October 15, 1981 (age 45) Dakar, Senegal
- Listed height: 6 ft 11 in (2.11 m)
- Listed weight: 249 lb (113 kg)

Career information
- College: Cal State Fullerton (2000–2004)
- NBA draft: 2004: undrafted
- Playing career: 2005–present

Career history
- 2005–2008: Jilin Northeast Tigers
- 2007: Los Angeles D-Fenders
- 2007: Vaqueros de Bayamón
- 2008–2009: Toyama Grouses
- 2009: Takamatsu Five Arrows
- 2009–2010: Al-Ansar
- 2010–2011: Ohud Medina
- 2011–2012: Kyoto Hannaryz
- 2012–2013: Lechugueros de León
- 2013: Gaiteros del Zulia
- 2013–2014: Lechugueros de León
- 2014–present: Titánicos de León

Babacar Camara (born October 15, 1981) is a Senegalese professional basketball player for Titánicos de León in Mexico.

== Career overview ==
Camara grew up in Dakar, Senegal. After graduating from Yalla En High School in 1999, he went to Cheikh Anta Diop University for a short while before transferring to Cal State Fullerton, where he played college basketball for four years. After graduating from there he played professional basketball with noteworthy performances especially for the Chinese team Jilin Northeast Tigers. He also played with Los Angeles D-Fenders and for many international teams.

== Achievements ==
- 2005 Senegal national basketball team
