= Titánicos de León =

- Leagues: LNBP
- Founded: 2014
- Dissolved: 2015
- History: Titánicos de León; 2014–2015
- Arena: Domo de la Feria
- Capacity: 4,590
- Location: León, Mexico
- President: Jesús Cano Sáenz
- Head coach: Alfred Julbe Bosch
- Website: www.titanicos.com This website has been taken down as of 2020.
| Home | Away | Third |

Titánicos de León is a Mexican professional basketball team based in León, Guanajuato, that plays in the LNBP. The team was founded in 2014, and entered the LNBP for the first time in the 2014–15 season.

== Notable players ==
- (Senegal) Babacar Camara
- (United States) Jumaine Jones
