= Josh Asselin =

American basketball player (born 1978)

Personal information
- Born: December 24, 1978 (age 47) Caro, Michigan, U.S.
- Listed height: 6 ft 11 in (2.11 m)
- Listed weight: 235 lb (107 kg)

Career information
- College: Michigan (1997–2001)
- NBA draft: 2001: undrafted
- Playing career: 2001–2015
- Position: Center / power forward

Career history
- 2001–2002: CI Rosalía de Castro
- 2002–2003: Clermont
- 2003–2004: Roanoke Dazzle
- 2004–2005: Cáceres
- 2005–2006: Alerta Cantabria
- 2006: Pau-Lacq-Orthez
- 2006–2009: Ricoh Manresa
- 2009: Real Betis
- 2010: Donetsk
- 2010: UCAM Murcia
- 2010–2011: Movistar Estudiantes
- 2011–2013: Assignia Manresa
- 2013: Brujos de Guayama
- 2013–2014: La Bruixa d'Or Manresa
- 2015: Malvín
- 2015: Panionios

Career highlights
- All-NBDL First Team (2004)

Joshua Joseph Asselin (born December 24, 1978) is an American-Dominican former professional basketball player who primarily played in Spain during the 2000s to 2010s. Before playing in Spain, Asselin was on the Michigan Wolverines men's basketball team from 1997 to 2001. As part of his 879 career points, Asselin's 136 blocks remained in the top ten for most career blocks at Michigan for almost twenty years. During his time with multiple teams in the Liga Española de Baloncesto duiring the 2000s, Asselin and Bàsquet Manresa won the 2006–07 LEB season playoffs. As a Liga ACB player from 2007 to 2015, Asselin had the 2007-2008 league season record in blocks and reached the Eurocup Basketball 2010–11 Quarterfinals with Asefa Estudiantes.

Outside of Spain, Asselin was on the Roanoke Dazzle with the National Basketball Development League from 2003 to 2004. During the season, he held the season record for most free throws and was part of the All-NBDL First Team. With the Dominican Republic, Asselin and his team reached the quarterfinals of the 2005 FIBA Americas Championship. He was also on the Dominican Republic basketball team that did not obtain a qualifying spot into the 2012 Summer Olympics after the 2012 FIBA World Olympic Qualifying Tournament for Men. Other countries that Asselin has played for include France, Iran and Uruguay.

== Early life and education ==
Asselin was born in Caro, Michigan on December 24, 1978. Growing up, Asselin played various sports until basketball became his specialty during his teenage years. Asselin was raised by his parents before his mother died on the day he turned 18. For his post-secondary education, Asselin was asked by multiple universities to enroll with them including University of Notre Dame and University of California, Los Angeles. In 1997, Asselin joined the Michigan Wolverines men's basketball team.

Asselin injured his thumb while training with Michigan in 1998 and continued to play with his thumb injury in 1999. He was a candidate to play basketball for the United States at the 1999 World University Games but did not make the final roster. At the 1998 NCAA Division I men's basketball tournament, Asselin and Michigan were defeated by UCLA in the second round. Asselin also competed with Michigan in the first round of the 2000 National Invitation Tournament. In 2001, Asselin continued to play on the Michigan basketball team with a scholarship. Apart from basketball, Asselin studied telecommunications engineering.

During his years with Michigan, Asselin was a co-captain of the basketball team from 1999 to 2001. After his final year in 2001, Asselin had 136 blocks during his 121 games. With his blocks, Asselin was in the top ten for most career blocks for almost twenty years by 2020. From 1999 to 2001, Asselin held the season record for most blocks at Michigan. He also had the highest field goal percentage in 1999 and 2000 for Michigan. In other statistics, Asselin had 592 rebounds as part of his 879 career points.

== Career ==
=== 2001 to 2004 ===
Between 2001 and 2002, Asselin was a member of the CI Rosalía de Castro team in Spain. With the Liga Española de Baloncesto team, Asselin had 143 points after 15 regular season games and 3 playoff games. From 2002 to 2003, Asselin played in France with Stade Clermontois in the LNB Pro B. During his 29 games with Clermont, Asselin had 152 rebounds and 243 field goals while accumulating 343 points.

As a free agent, Asselin was picked to train with the Golden State Warriors in 2003. After practicing with the Warriors, Asselin was cut from the team. During the 2003 National Basketball Development League draft, Asselin was picked by the Roanoke Dazzle in the first round. With the Dazzle from 2003 to 2004, Asselin played in 46 games and has 664 points. Of these points, Asselin had 238 field goals and 242 free throws. With his 242 free throws, Asselin had the 2003–2004 season record for most scored free throws. That season, Asselin was selected as part of the All-NBDL First Team.

=== 2004 to 2007 ===
Starting in 2004, Asselin spent a season each in the LEB with the Caceres Club Baloncesto, Cantabria Baloncesto and Bàsquet Manresa. During these seasons, Asselin reached the quarterfinals with Baloncesto during the 2004–05 LEB season. Asselin named Most Valuable player while he and Manresa won the playoffs in the 2006–07 LEB season. After ending his time at the LEB in 2007, Asselin had 894 rebounds and 684 field goals while amassing 1791 points in his 128 games with the four teams.

In between this time period, Asselin went to Venezuela in 2004 to play in the Liga Profesional de Baloncesto with Trotamundos de Carabobo. After a month in the LPB, Asselin moved to Puerto Rico to join Gallitos de Isabela for another month stint. As part of the Baloncesto Superior Nacional, Asselin scored 114 points with Gallitos de Isabela. In 2005, Asselin returned to France as part of the Élan Béarnais Pau-Lacq-Orthez team as part of the LNB Pro A. During his seven games with Pau-Orthez, his team reached the semi-finals during the 2005–06 Pro A season. The following year, he expanded his basketball career to the Dominican Republic as a member of the Naco team.

=== 2007 to 2015 ===
As a member of the Liga ACB from 2007 to 2014, Asselin played in two seasons each with Ricoh Manresa and La Bruixa d'Or. During this time period, Asselin was also with CB Murcia, Asefa Estudiantes and Assignia Manresa for one season and briefly played for Cajasol. With Asefa Estudiantes, Asselin and his team reached the Eurocup Basketball 2010–11 Quarterfinals. With his combined statistics, Asselin had 2,279 points and 900 rebounds during his 216 games in the ACB. He also had the 2007–2008 season block record in the ACB with 69 blocks.

In the duration of his ACB career, Asselin briefly played for Ukraine in 2009 as part of the Donetsk team. In his only VTB United League game, Asselin amassed five points. In 2013, Asselin returned to Puerto Rico for a few months to play with the Brujos de Guayama. With the BSN team, Asselin had 47 points. During his 21 games with Guayama, Asselin and his team made the semifinals of the league's playoffs. That year, Asselin was signed by Foolad Mahan Isfahan as a temporary player for the Iran team. During the 2014-15 Greek Basket League, Asselin played in four games with Panionios B.C.

=== FIBA events ===
Asselin was part of the Dominican Republic team that reached the quarterfinals of the 2005 FIBA Americas Championship. He was tied for fifth for the highest block percentage at the tournament with 1.4. With Donetsk, Asselin and the Ukrainian team competed in the regular season of the 2009–10 FIBA EuroChallenge. In 2012, Asselin was selected for Dominican Republic before qualification for the men's basketball event at the 2012 Summer Olympics started. After the 2012 FIBA World Olympic Qualifying Tournament for Men, Asselin and his team did not gain a qualifying spot into the Olympics.

With the Dominican Republic, Asselin and his team won the 2012 Centrobasket tournament. During the 2013 FIBA Asia Champions Cup, Asselin had a dislocated shoulder during the quarterfinals. With Foolad Mahan Isfahan, Asselin and the Iran team won the 2013 Asian Cup final. At the 2015 FIBA Americas League, Asselin and Malvin reached the preliminary round played for Uruguay.

== Honors and personal life ==
Throughout the years with Michigan, Asselin won multiple basketball awards with the team. These included the Rudy Tomjanovich Most Improved Player in 1999 and the Loy Vaught Rebounding Award in 2001. In 2018, MLive chose Asselin as one of the best 25 centers at Michigan high schools between 1993 and 2018. Asselin studied Spanish in university and French while he was married.
