= Patrick Doctor =

American basketball player (born 1980)

Personal information
- Born: February 11, 1980 (age 46) Washington, D.C., U.S.
- Listed height: 6 ft 9 in (2.06 m)
- Listed weight: 230 lb (104 kg)

Career information
- High school: Gwynn Park (Brandywine, Maryland)
- College: American (1998–2002)
- NBA draft: 2002: undrafted
- Playing career: 2002–2003
- Position: Power forward / center
- Number: 32

Career history
- 2002–2003: Sioux Falls Skyforce
- 2003: Columbus Riverdragons

Career highlights
- AP Honorable mention All-American (2002); Patriot League Player of the Year (2002); First-team All-Patriot League (2002); First-team All-CAA (2000); Second-team All-CAA (2001)

Patrick Doctor (born February 11, 1980) is an American former professional basketball player. He played college basketball at American University between 1998 and 2002, where he was a three-time all-conference selection and the 2002 Patriot League Player of the Year. After graduating college, he had short stints in the Continental Basketball Association and National Basketball Development League.

== High school and college careers ==
Doctor grew up in Brandywine, Maryland and attended Gwynn Park High School, where as a senior in 1997–98 he was named to The Washington Post's All-Met First Team. He averaged 19.8 points, 13.4 rebounds, and 2 blocks per game while leading Gwynn Park to the Prince George's Class 3A title.

A 6'9" power forward / center, Doctor then went on to play in college for American. He had a strong freshman campaign which saw him average 11.0 points and 6.2 rebounds per game. The following season, he averaged 15.4 points, 7.0 rebounds, 1.1 assists, and 1.4 steals per game en route to an All-Colonial Athletic Association First Team selection as a sophomore. In 2000–01, Doctor's junior season, he was once again named an All-CAA performer. He earned a spot on the Second Team after averaging 16.1 points, 7.3 rebounds, and 1.4 assists.

Heading into Doctor's senior year of 2001–02, American had switched conferences and left the CAA to join the Patriot League. In just the school's first year as a Patriot member, Doctor took home the men's basketball top award and was named the Patriot League Player of the Year. He led the Eagles (16–11 overall, 10–4 conference) to the regular season title and the top seed in the 2002 Patriot League tournament, where the Eagles lost by four points to Holy Cross in the championship game. That season, he averaged 15.0 points and 6.0 rebounds per game while also leading the conference in field goal shooting percentage (57.9%). He was also named to the All-Patriot League First Team, and was honored as an Associated Press honorable mention All-American. Doctor finished his American career with 1,461 points, 672 rebounds, and 97 assists.

== Professional career ==
After going undrafted in the 2002 NBA draft, Doctor moved to Belgium to play for Basket Bree, but was released by the team prior to the start of the season.

On December 2, 2002, Doctor signed with the Sioux Falls Skyforce of the Continental Basketball Association. He appeared in four games during the 2002–03 season, averaging 6.8 points and 6.8 rebounds per game.

In November 2003, Doctor was selected in the sixth round of the NBDL draft by the Columbus Riverdragons. He was released by the Riverdragons on December 2, 2003, after suffering a season-ending knee injury. He played in three games for Columbus, averaging 21.7 minutes, 10.3 points and 4.7 rebounds per game, including 13 points and six rebounds against the Huntsville Flight on November 21.
