= 2003 National Basketball Development League draft =

General information
- Sport: Basketball
- Date: November 6, 2003

Overview
- League: NBA
- First selection: Ken Johnson

The 2003 NBDL Draft was the third annual draft by the National Basketball Development League. It was held on November 6, 2003.

== Draft ==
=== Key ===
Pos.	G	F	C
Position	Guard	Forward	Center

=== Round 1 ===
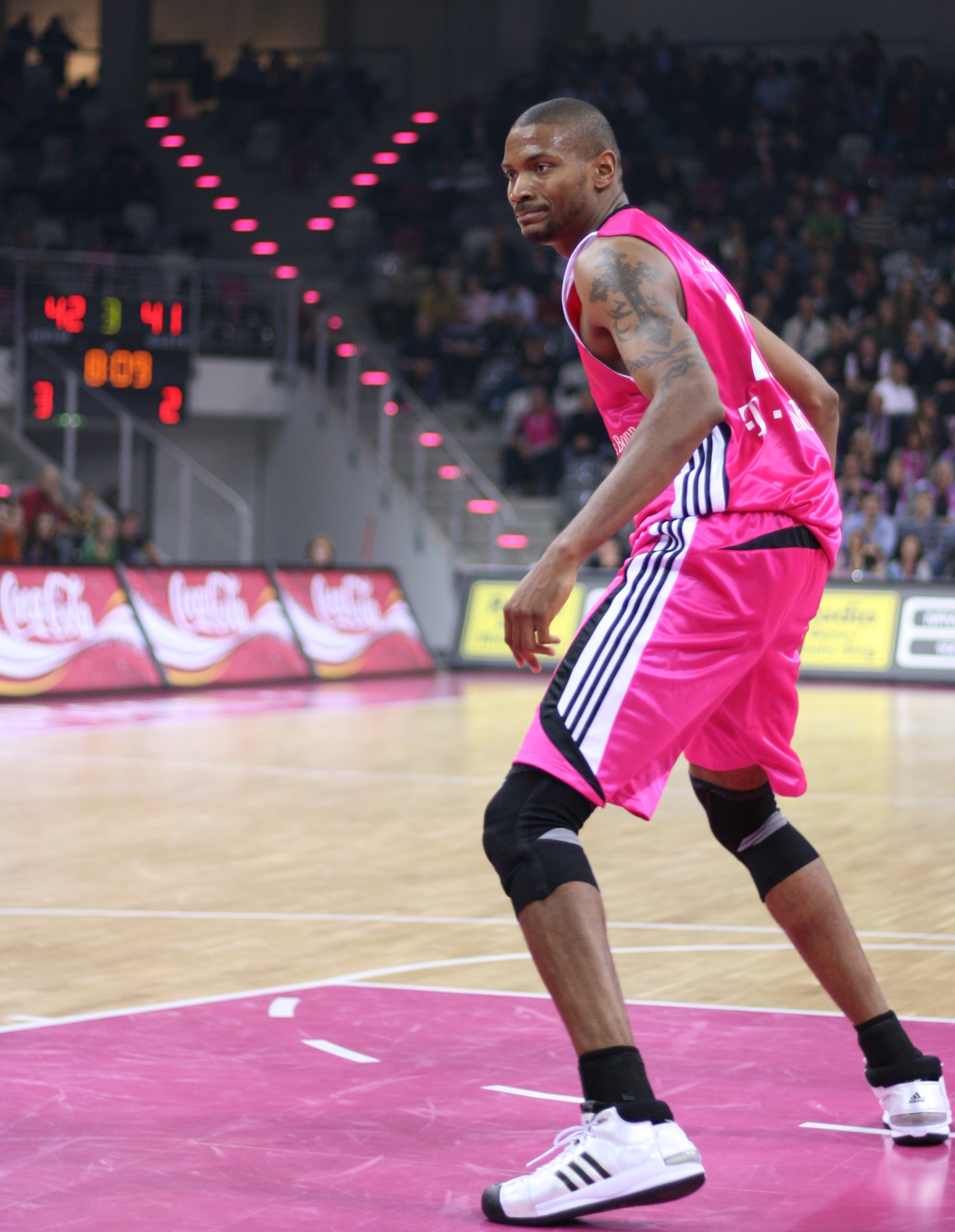
Ken Johnson was the first overall pick in the 2003 NBDL Draft. He was also drafted by the Miami Heat with the 48th pick in the 2001 NBA draft.

Team	Player
Huntsville	Ken Johnson
Columbus	Terence Morris
Asheville	Lavor Postell
Roanoke	Josh Asselin
Charleston	Rolan Roberts
Fayetteville	Jason Collier

=== Round 2 ===
Team	Player
Huntsville	Ronald Dupree
Columbus	Courtney James
Asheville	Antonio Meeking
Roanoke	Chris Christoffersen
Charleston	Carl English
Fayetteville	Sam Clancy Jr.

=== Round 3 ===
Team	Player
Huntsville	Erick Barkley
Columbus	Kevin Lyde
Asheville	Desmond Penigar
Roanoke	DeMario Jones
Charleston	Hiram Fuller
Fayetteville	Ronald Blackshear

=== Round 4 ===
Team	Player
Huntsville	Philip Ricci
Columbus	Matt Laur
Asheville	Kareem Reid
Roanoke	Marque Perry
Charleston	James Smith
Fayetteville	Darrell Johns

=== Round 5 ===
Team	Player
Huntsville	Rick Apodaca
Columbus	Germaine Chase
Asheville	Lavoris Jerry
Roanoke	Gilson DeJesus
Charleston	Charles Manga
Fayetteville	Kueth Duany

=== Round 6 ===
Team	Player
Huntsville	Mateen Cleaves
Columbus	Patrick Doctor
Asheville	Jai Pradia
Roanoke	Mike Mackell
Charleston	Jarrod Gee
Fayetteville	Kent Williams

=== Round 7 ===
Team	Player
Huntsville	Uche Okafor
Columbus	Derrick Zimmerman
Asheville	Jaquay Walls
Roanoke	Mike King
Charleston	Victor Williams
Fayetteville	Chudney Gray

=== Round 8 ===
Team	Player
Huntsville	Jamario Moon
Columbus	Erron Maxey
Asheville	Tobe Carberry
Roanoke	Kevin Owens
Charleston	Muhammed Lasege
Fayetteville	Nick Neumann

=== Round 9 ===
Team	Player
Huntsville	Rashid Hardwick
Columbus	Tahric Gosley
Asheville	John Martin
Roanoke	Andre Matthews
Charleston	Tony Rutland
Fayetteville	Donnell Knight

=== Round 10 ===
Team	Player
Huntsville	Duke Freeman-McKamey
Columbus	Tai Crutchfield
Asheville	David Webber
Roanoke	Jonathan Jones
Charleston	Moses Malone Jr.
Fayetteville	Larry Reid
