= Bracey Wright =

American basketball player (born 1984)

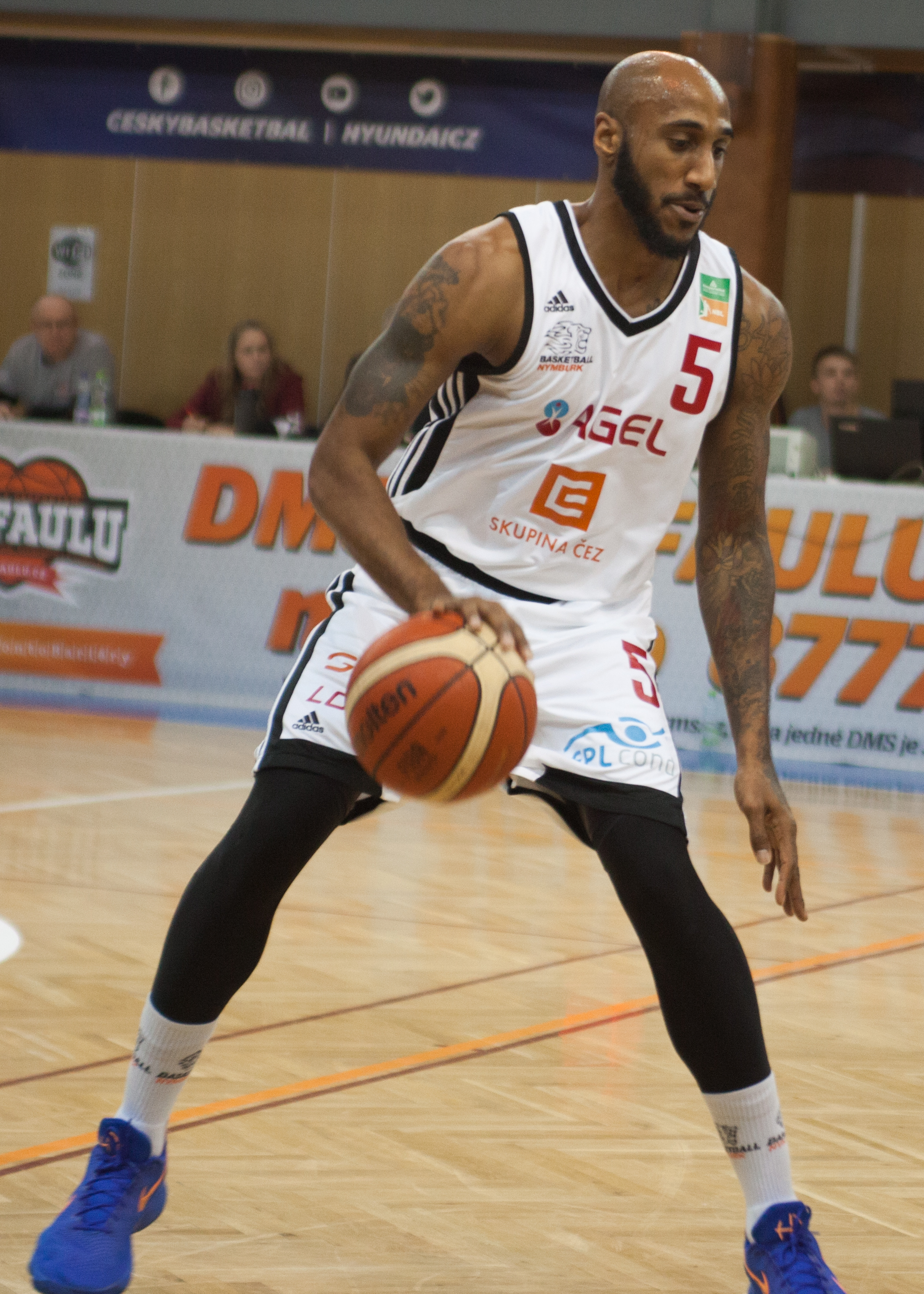
- Wright with Nymburk in 2019

Personal information
- Born: July 1, 1984 (age 42) Dallas, Texas, U.S.
- Listed height: 6 ft 3 in (1.91 m)
- Listed weight: 210 lb (95 kg)

Career information
- High school: The Colony (The Colony, Texas)
- College: Indiana (2002–2005)
- NBA draft: 2005: 2nd round, 47th overall pick
- Drafted by: Minnesota Timberwolves
- Playing career: 2005–2019
- Position: Shooting guard / point guard
- Number: 6, 5

Career history

Playing
- 2005–2007: Minnesota Timberwolves
- 2005–2006: Florida Flame
- 2007–2008: Aris
- 2008–2009: Joventut Badalona
- 2009: Aris
- 2009–2010: Oostende
- 2010–2011: Paris-Levallois
- 2011: Cedevita
- 2011–2012: Zaragoza
- 2012–2013: Cedevita
- 2013–2014: Krasnye Krylia
- 2014–2015: Hapoel Jerusalem
- 2015–2016: Pınar Karşıyaka
- 2016–2017: Acıbadem Üniversitesi
- 2017–2018: Büyükçekmece
- 2018–2019: ČEZ Nymburk

Coaching
- 2023–2024: Santa Cruz Warriors (assistant)

Career highlights
- Israeli Super League Finals MVP (2015); All-EuroCup Second Team (2011); First-team All-Big Ten (2005); McDonald's All-American (2002); Second-team Parade All-American (2002)
- Stats at NBA.com
- Stats at Basketball Reference

Bracey Arman Wright (born July 1, 1984) is an American former professional basketball player. He played college basketball for the Indiana Hoosiers.

== Amateur career ==
Wright attended The Colony High School in The Colony, Texas. He was a high school teammate of future NBA guard Deron Williams. He was a 2002 McDonald's All American. After being highly recruited out of high school, Wright played college basketball for the Indiana University Hoosiers from 2002 to 2004.

He scored 1,498 career points at Indiana and made 186 career three-pointers. Wright was named to the First Team All-Big Ten in 2004. As a junior, Wright led the Big Ten in scoring (18.3 points per game), while posting 25 or more points on seven occasions.

=== College statistics ===
Year	Team	GP	GS	MPG	FG%	3P%	FT%	RPG	APG	SPG	BPG	PPG
2002–03	Indiana	30	30	33.6	.433	.375	.752	5.0	2.1	.8	.6	16.2
2003–04	Indiana	29	29	38.3	.374	.343	.789	5.4	2.4	.9	.5	18.5
2004–05	Indiana	26	26	35.3	.413	.329	.783	4.8	2.7	1.1	.6	18.3
Career		85	85	35.7	.405	.350	.776	5.1	2.4	.9	.6	17.6

== Professional career ==
Wright left Indiana for the NBA after three seasons. He was drafted by the Minnesota Timberwolves in the 2005 NBA draft. The Timberwolves assigned him to the Florida Flame of the D-League for the 2005–06 season. He spent one more year in Minnesota.

On July 31, 2007, he signed with the Greek club Aris. In 2010, Wright signed a deal with Belgian Base Oostende for the remainder of the season. He was signed in the off season by Paris-Levallois in the French Pro A League and found a role as the starting shooting guard and back up point guard. In January 2011, he signed with Cedevita in Croatia. He was named to the All-EuroCup Second Team, and finished in 3rd place at the 2010–11 EuroCup Final 4 Championship with his team Cedevita. Wright was also the Quarterfinals Game 2 MVP for the 2010–11 Eurocup Finals. In July 2011, he signed with CAI Zaragoza in Spain. He returned to KK Cedevita in July 2012. In September 2013, he signed with Krasnye Krylia.

In January 2014, Wright signed with Hapoel Jerusalem for the rest of the season. In July 2014, he re-signed with Hapoel for three more years. In the 2014–15 season, Wright averaged 13.9 points, along with 3.4 rebounds and 3.2 assists, in the 26 Israeli Super League games in which he played. In the 2015 Super League Finals, in which he faced off against Hapoel Eilat, he averaged 19 points per game, and was named the finals MVP.

On August 3, 2016, Wright signed with Acıbadem Üniversitesi.

On July 4, 2017, Wright signed with Turkish club Büyükçekmece Basketbol.

== International career ==
Wright was a member of the gold medal-winning USA World Championship for Young Men Qualifying Team at the 2004 FIBA Americas World Championships.

== Coaching career ==
On September 18, 2023, Wright was hired by the Santa Cruz Warriors of the NBA G League to be an assistant coach and player development coach.

== Personal life ==
Wright along with wife, Jasmine, have 4 children Bracey Jr, Bailey, Aaliyah and Sade. Wright is the son of SMU basketball great Carl Wright. Wright has a great appreciation for the world of football (soccer) and is an avid member of the Juventus fan club. He is also known to enjoy cooking, fitness and reading.
