= Jumaine Jones =

American basketball player (born 1979)

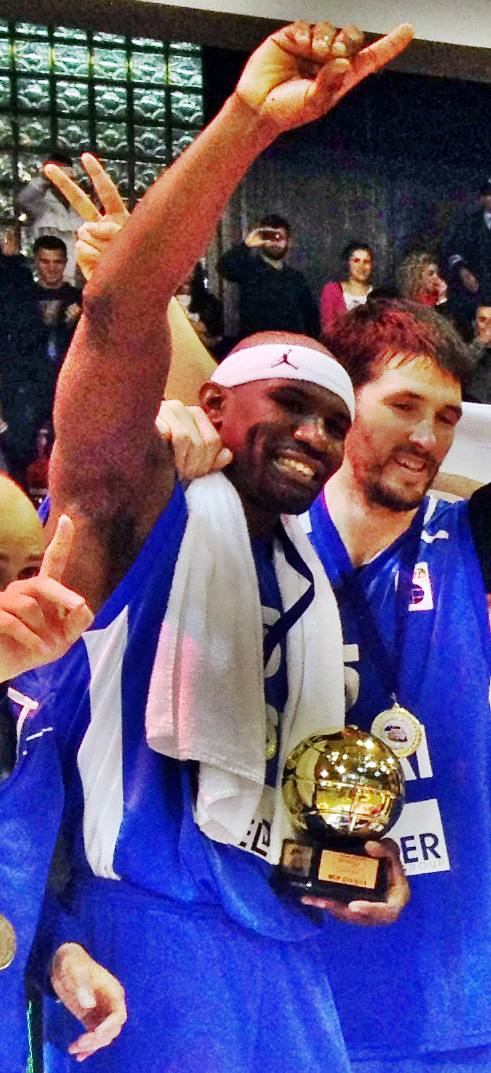

Personal information
- Born: February 10, 1979 (age 47) Cocoa, Florida, U.S.
- Listed height: 6 ft 8 in (2.03 m)
- Listed weight: 230 lb (104 kg)

Career information
- High school: Mitchell-Baker (Camilla, Georgia)
- College: Georgia (1997–1999)
- NBA draft: 1999: 1st round, 27th overall pick
- Drafted by: Atlanta Hawks
- Playing career: 1999–2016
- Position: Power forward / small forward
- Number: 33, 20

Career history
- 1999–2001: Philadelphia 76ers
- 2001–2003: Cleveland Cavaliers
- 2003–2004: Boston Celtics
- 2004–2005: Los Angeles Lakers
- 2005–2006: Charlotte Bobcats
- 2006–2007: Phoenix Suns
- 2007–2008: Basket Napoli
- 2008: Sagesse Club Beirut
- 2008–2009: PBC Ural Great Perm
- 2009: Mets de Guaynabo
- 2009–2011: Juvecaserta Basket
- 2011–2012: Victoria Libertas Pesaro
- 2012–2013: Bnei Herzliya
- 2013: Mets de Guaynabo
- 2013–2014: Levski Sofia
- 2014–2015: Titánicos de León
- 2015–2016: Fuerza Guinda de Nogales

Career highlights
- First-team All-SEC (1999); Third-team All-SEC (1998); SEC Co-Freshman of the Year (1998); Second-team Parade All-American (1997)
- Stats at NBA.com
- Stats at Basketball Reference
Medals
Men's basketball
Representing United States
Goodwill Games
Gold medal – first place	1998 New York	Team competition

Jumaine Lanard Jones (born February 10, 1979) is an American former professional basketball player. An NBA player from 1999 to 2007 drafted from the University of Georgia, he played the small forward and power forward positions.

== Amateur career ==
Known as the "Thrilla From Camilla", Jones is originally from Cocoa, Florida, he moved to South Georgia as a freshman, where he played competitive high school basketball in the small town of Camilla, Georgia. There he honed his skills and as a senior became a 1997 2nd Team Parade All-American, averaging 32.8ppg 13.5rbs 3.7ast & 2.6blks per game. He spent two standout seasons at the University of Georgia. As a freshman Jones shared the Freshman of the Year award with University of Tennessee guard Tony Harris in 1997–98 season, leading the team in scoring and rebounding averaging 14.7ppg 8.5rbs & 1.0ast. Building on a good freshman campaign, Jones became the first UGA sophomore to lead the SEC in scoring since Vern Fleming in 1984, averaging 18.8ppg 9.5rbs & 1.2stls. Additionally, in 1998–99 season, he was the first sophomore in school history to score 1,000 points since Dominique Wilkins did so in 1981. That year, he was also selected to represent the U.S. at the 1998 Goodwill Games. On the 1998 Goodwill Games Team, Jones started all 5 games alongside future 1999 NBA overall 1st pick Elton Brand as wells as overall 6th pick Wally Szczerbiak and 8th Andre Miller.

== Professional career ==
=== NBA ===
Declaring himself eligible for the 1999 NBA draft, he was selected by the Atlanta Hawks with the 27th overall pick, but he was immediately traded to the Philadelphia 76ers, where he spent two years. On December 30, 1999, against the Portland Trail Blazers, Jones became a part of NBA history when he scored the final basket of the 1990s and as a result he is a member of the NBA Hall of Fame. As the 76ers became the 2001 Eastern Conference champions, Jones started throughout the postseason after current starter George Lynch went down with an injury, including the 2001 NBA Finals, in which the Los Angeles Lakers defeated the 76ers in five games. Jones' best game of the 2001 NBA playoffs came in game 7 of the Eastern Conference Semis against the Vince Carter-led Toronto Raptors. Jones played 31 minutes going 6–9 from the field and tallying 16 points, 4 rebounds, and an assist.

He then played two years with the Cleveland Cavaliers, before being traded to the Boston Celtics. In Boston, he suffered an injury early into the season and limited his appearances. In 2004, he was sent to the Los Angeles Lakers, but only when the deal was renegotiated after Gary Payton initially refused to report to the Celtics. On October 26, 2005, Jones was traded to the Charlotte Bobcats in exchange for a future second-round draft pick. On August 31, 2006, he signed a one-year contract with the Phoenix Suns. Jones was signed as an unrestricted free agent by the New Jersey Nets on October 1, 2007, but he was waived later that month.

=== International ===
He signed a one-year contract with Basket Napoli on October 24, 2007. With Napoli, Jones averaged 17.9 points and 8.4 rebounds per game. On July 21, 2008, Jones signed a contract with PBC Ural Great Perm of the Russian Basketball Super League. With Ural, Jones averaged 7.4 points, 5.2 rebounds, and 1.4 assists.

In July 2009, he signed a contract with Juvecaserta Basket. In July 2011, he signed with Victoria Libertas Pesaro. In 2012, he joined Bnei Herzliya of Israel. In 2013, he signed with the Mets de Guaynabo in Puerto Rico.

He also had a small stint with Lebanese Basketball League powerhouse Sagesse Club Beirut.

In September 2013, he signed a one-year deal with Levski Sofia.

On December 3, 2014, he signed with Mexican team Titánicos de León.

== Career statistics ==
=== Domestic leagues ===
Season	Team	League	GP	MPG	FG%	3P%	FT%	RPG	APG	SPG	BPG	PPG
2007–08	Eldo Basket Napoli	Lega A	26	35.9	.486	.435	.744	8.5	1.1	2.0	.7	17.9
2008–09	Sagesse Beirut	FLB League	no stats available									
2008–09	PBC Ural Great Perm	SuperLeague A	15	27.9	.456	.316	.667	5.3	1.5	1.2	.1	7.6
2009	Mets de Guaynabo	BSN	8	32.1	.492	.265	.808	9.3	3.0	1.1	.1	14.0
2009–10	Pepsi Caserta	Lega A	38	33.1	.488	.417	.736	8.4	1.2	2.1	.7	13.4
2010–11	Pepsi Caserta	Lega A	30	34.4	.549	.312	.796	8.6	1.5	2.2	.7	13.6
2011–12	Scavolini Pesaro	Lega A	41	32.2	.476	.361	.820	7.0	1.6	1.3	.4	11.6
2012–13	Bnei Herzliya	Ligat HaAl	27	34.6	.444	.312	.787	10.0	3.3	1.9	.4	12.9
2013	Mets de Guaynabo	BSN	7	13.4	.636	.286	1.000	4.4	.6	.1	.3	3.4
2013–14	BC Levski Sofia	Bulgaria NBL	35	28.7	.660	.391	.771	9.6	2.1	.7	.4	12.9
2013–14	BC Levski Sofia	Balkan League	19	31.7	.566	.397	.778	9.6	2.7	.9	.6	12.0
2014–15	Titánicos de León	Mexico LNPB	22	33.4	.604	.224	.783	12.8	3.1	.5	.3	12.9
