= Jayson Granger =

Uruguayan basketball player (born 1989)

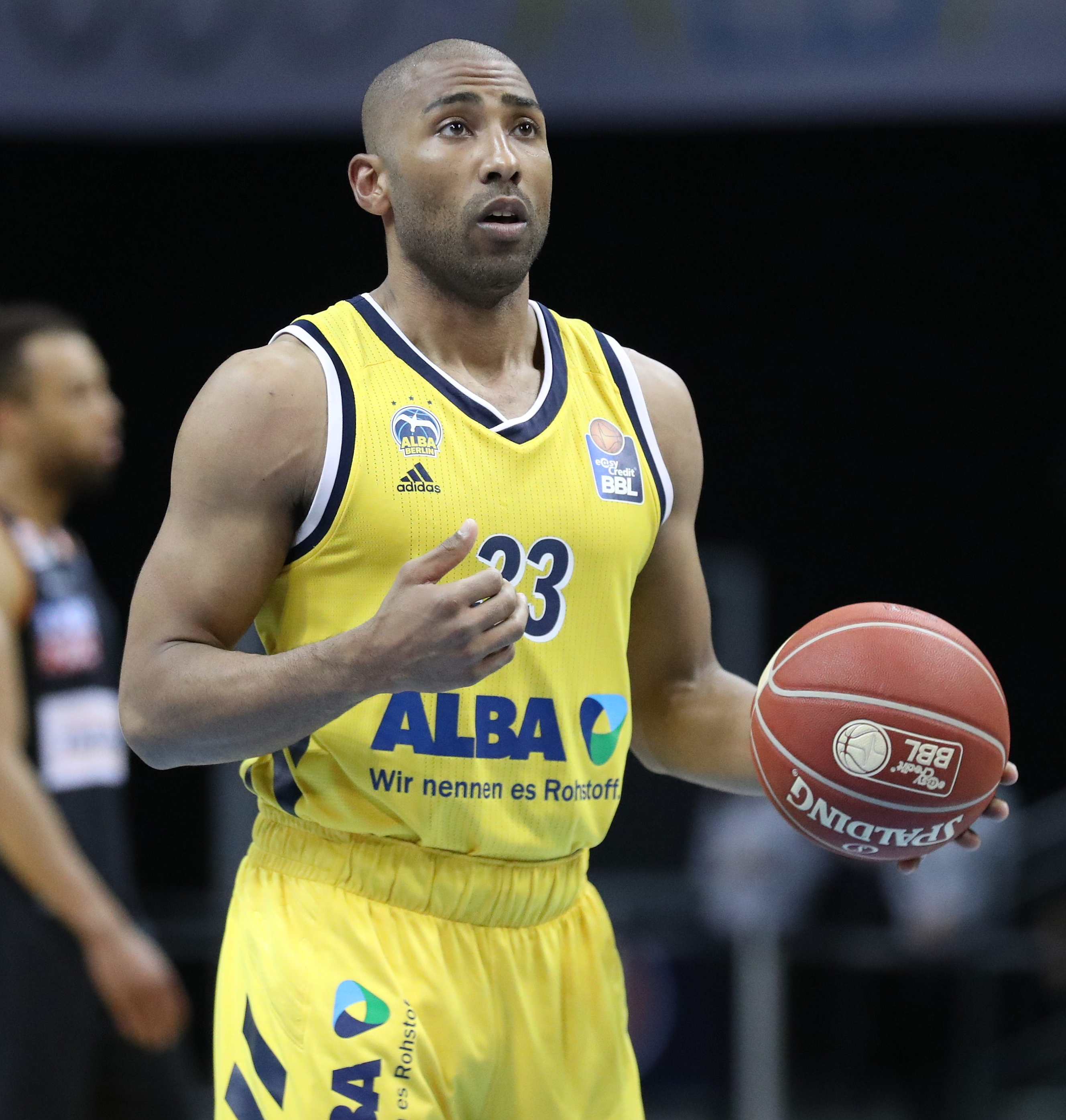
- Granger with Alba Berlin in 2021

Personal information
- Born: September 15, 1989 (age 37) Montevideo, Uruguay
- Listed height: 6 ft 2.5 in (1.89 m)
- Listed weight: 200 lb (91 kg)

Career information
- NBA draft: 2011: undrafted
- Playing career: 2007–2026
- Position: Point guard / shooting guard
- Number: 11, 15, 33

Career history
- 2007–2013: Estudiantes
- 2013–2015: Málaga
- 2015–2017: Anadolu Efes
- 2017–2020: Baskonia
- 2020–2021: Alba Berlin
- 2021–2022: Baskonia
- 2022–2023: Reyer Venezia
- 2023–2024: Peñarol
- 2024–2026: Estudiantes

Career highlights
- Spain Cup champion (2026); Bundesliga Finals MVP (2021); All-Bundesliga Second Team (2021); Bundesliga champion (2021); Liga ACB champion (2020); All-ACB First Team (2015); Turkish Presidential Cup winner (2015)
- Stats at Basketball Reference
Medals
Men's basketball
Representing Uruguay
FIBA South American Championship
Bronze medal – third place	2012 Argentina
FIBA South American Under-17 Championship
Silver medal – second place	2005 Venezuela	Under-17
FIBA South American Under-16 Championship
Silver medal – second place	2005 Uruguay

Jayson Antonie Granger Amodio (born September 15, 1989) is a Uruguayan former professional basketball player. Listed at a height of 6'2 1/2" (1.89 m) tall without shoes, and 200 lbs. (91 kg) in weight, he played at both the point guard and shooting guard positions.

== Professional career ==
=== Youth levels ===
Granger, a native of Montevideo, Uruguay, played in the youth ranks of the Uruguayan club Club Atlético Cordón (in Spanish).

=== Estudiantes ===
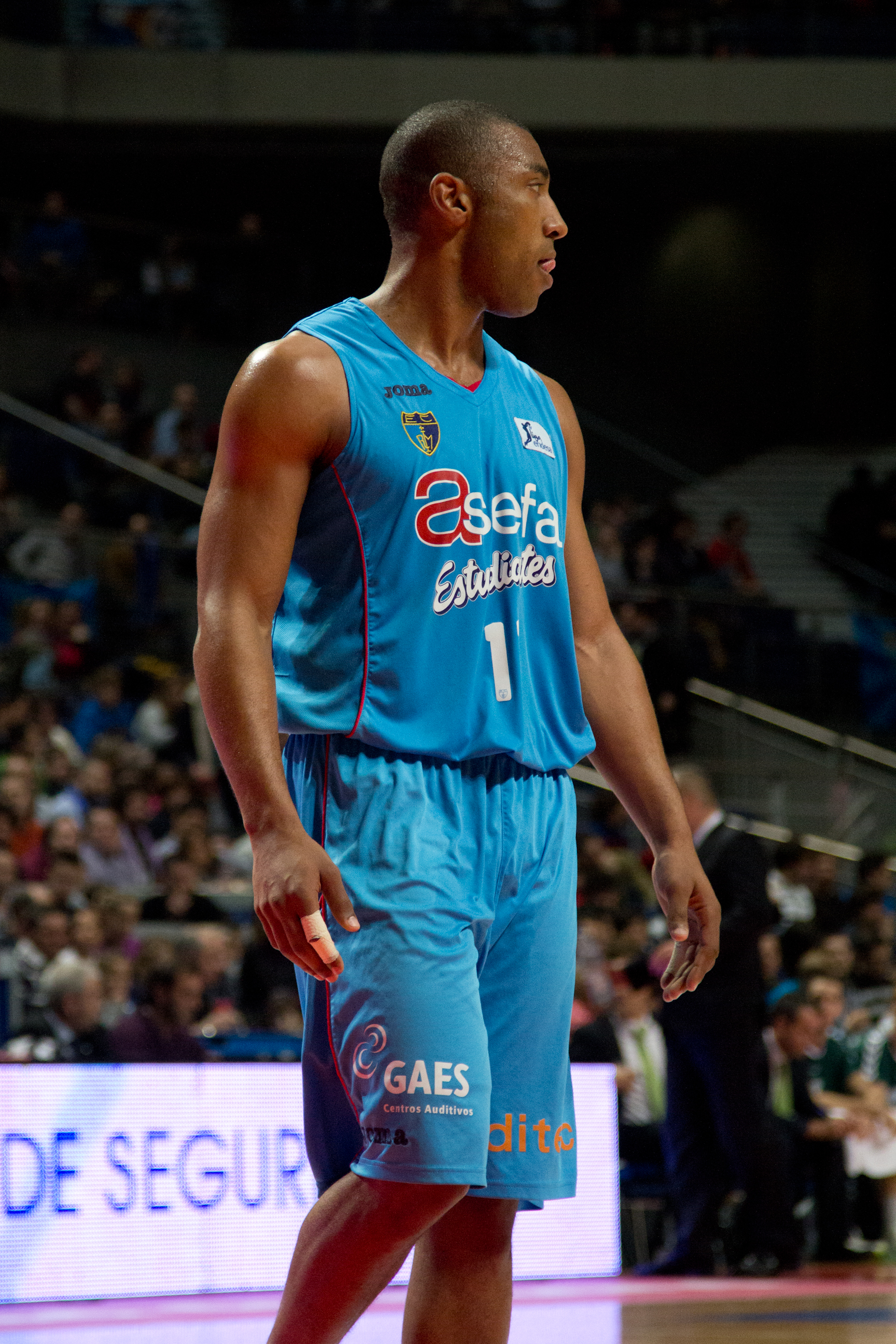
Granger playing with Estudiantes, in 2013.

In December 2005, Granger had a trial with the Spanish team Estudiantes, and he signed with them in 2006, at only 16.

However, Granger's Uruguayan club, Cordón, requested a formation indemnity, meaning that Granger could only play in the amateur Spanish 4th-tier level Liga EBA, for one-and-a-half years, whilst a FIBA tribunal was deciding the case. The tribunal finally awarded the Uruguayan side €25,000 as compensation in 2007, with Granger being very critical of his former team's actions.

During the summer of 2007, he participated in the Americas Basketball Without Borders camp, and he was selected as the camp MVP. Granger made his Spanish 1st-tier level Liga ACB professional debut during the 2007–08 season. During the 2012–13 Spanish ACB season, he averaged 11 points and 3.4 assists per game in the Spanish Liga ACB.

=== Unicaja ===
Granger played in the 2013 NBA Summer League, in July 2013, with the Boston Celtics' summer league squad, posting 6 points and 3.6 assists per game, in around 18 minutes per game, in 5 games played. After his contract with Estudiantes expired, he signed with the Spanish club Unicaja, later that same month, for an offer his former team couldn't match.

Granger played in the 2014 NBA Summer League, in July 2014, with the Cleveland Cavaliers' summer league squad, where he had averages of 2.3 points and 1 assist per game, in about 9 minutes per game, in 4 games played.

Granger was selected to the All-Spanish ACB League Team of the 2014–15 season, after being selected as one of the league's two best guards, along with Sergio Llull. He averaged 9.7 points, 3.3 rebounds, 5.2 assists, and 1.2 steals per game in the Spanish ACB League's regular season. He also played a key role in his team's run to the Spanish ACB League playoff semifinals.

=== Anadolu Efes ===
On 26 June 2015, Granger signed a two-year contract with the Turkish team Anadolu Efes.

=== Baskonia ===
On August 16, 2017, Granger signed a three-year deal with Baskonia of Liga ACB and the EuroLeague.

=== Alba Berlin ===
On August 1, 2020, signed a one-year contract with Alba Berlin of the Basketball Bundesliga and the EuroLeague. On June 11, 2021, Alba won their 10th BBL title after beating Bayern Munich 3–1 in the finals. Granger scored 29 points in the fourth game of the series and was named Finals MVP.

=== Return to Baskonia ===
On July 13, 2021, Granger officially returned to Baskonia, signing a two-year deal.

=== Reyer Venezia ===
On July 4, 2022, he signed with Reyer Venezia of the Lega Basket Serie A (LBA).

=== Peñarol ===
He signed one year contract with his native country club in July, 2023.

=== Return to Estudiantes ===
On July 4, 2024, Granger made his return to Estudiantes after 11 years, signing a one-year contract. On August 1, 2025, he re-signed with the club for the 2025–26 season and was named team captain.

On July 24, 2026, Granger announced his retirement from professional basketball.

== National team career ==
Granger first played for the Uruguayan Under-16 junior national basketball team at the 2004 South American Championship for Cadets. In the 2005 FIBA South America Under-17 Championship, he led his team in scoring (26.6 points per game), rebounding (8.2 per game), and assists (4 per game), while also leading the whole tournament in scoring, as Uruguay reached the tournament's final. In the 2006 FIBA Americas Under-18 Championship, he posted team-leading 16.5 points per game (also 5th best for the tournament) and 6.8 assists per game (2nd best in the tournament).

However, Granger did not play with the senior Uruguayan national basketball team in the 2008 South American Championship, as the Uruguayan Basketball Federation refused his request to pay for his girlfriend's plane ticket to the tournament. He also turned down a selection to senior national team to play at the 2009 FIBA Americas Championship, citing an injury that the Uruguayan team doctors argued did not prevent him from playing. Granger also publicly expressed his resentment at the Uruguayan Basketball Federation, for their role in the dispute regarding his transfer, from Uruguay to Spain, in 2005 (see Professional career).

Granger would finally play with the senior Uruguayan national basketball team at the 2012 South American Championship, where he averaged 12.8 points per game (3rd on the team), 5.4 rebounds per game (2nd on the team), and 3.2 assists per game (1st on the team). The Uruguayan side finished the tournament in 3rd place, after losing in the semifinals to Argentina, despite Granger's 26 points, 9 rebounds, and 3 assists in the game.

He did not play at the 2013 FIBA Americas Championship, citing the need to take the time off, in order to properly integrate himself into his new club team, Unicaja.

== Personal life ==
Jayson Granger is the son of Jeff Granger, a New Jersey born American professional basketball player, who played in the Uruguayan League in the early 1980s. He became a Uruguayan citizen, and played for the senior Uruguayan national basketball team. He settled in at Montevideo, Uruguay, where Jayson was born.

== Career statistics ==
Legend
GP	Games played	GS	Games started	MPG	Minutes per game
FG%	Field-goal percentage	3P%	3-point field-goal percentage	FT%	Free-throw percentage
RPG	Rebounds per game	APG	Assists per game	SPG	Steals per game
BPG	Blocks per game	PPG	Points per game	PIR	Performance index rating
**Bold**	Career high

=== EuroLeague ===
Year	Team	GP	GS	MPG	FG%	3P%	FT%	RPG	APG	SPG	BPG	PPG	PIR
2013–14	Unicaja	24	7	21.3	.408	.293	**.861**	2.1	3.4	.6	—	7.5	8.5
2014–15	Unicaja	23	8	25.6	.404	.316	.760	2.7	4.2	.9	**.3**	**10.2**	**12.1**
2015–16	Anadolu Efes	23	14	**26.2**	.448	.315	.689	**3.1**	3.9	.7	.0	**10.2**	10.8
2016–17	Anadolu Efes	**35**	**32**	25.3	.463	.327	.753	2.7	3.9	.9	.1	9.7	10.3
2017–18	Baskonia	31	23	21.4	**.472**	**.405**	.737	1.9	**5.1**	.5	.0	9.3	11.3
2018–19	Baskonia	12	5	19.3	.370	**.405**	.643	1.6	2.4	.3	—	7.2	5.7
2020–21	Alba Berlin	28	21	23.2	.409	.336	.778	2.7	4.9	**1.0**	.0	8.1	11.4
2021–22	Baskonia	30	22	22.9	.339	.308	.795	2.0	3.9	.6	—	7.3	8.0
Career		206	132	23.4	.400	.338	.757	2.4	4.1	.7	.1	8.8	10.0
