= Nik Caner-Medley =

Azerbaijani-American basketball player

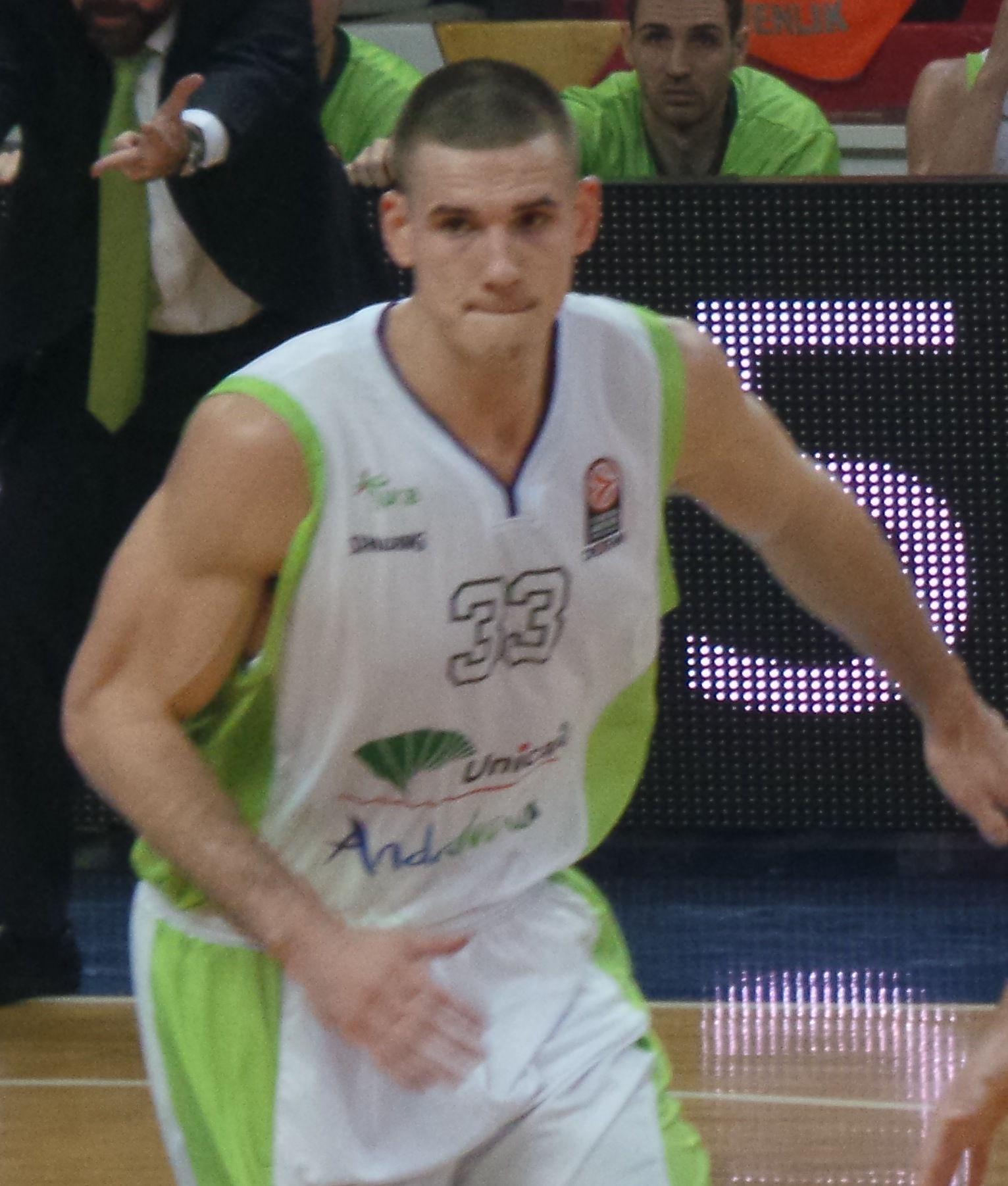
- Caner-Medley with Unicaja in 2013

Personal information
- Born: October 20, 1983 (age 43) Beverly, Massachusetts, U.S.
- Listed height: 6 ft 8 in (2.03 m)
- Listed weight: 230 lb (104 kg)

Career information
- High school: Deering (Portland, Maine)
- College: Maryland (2002–2006)
- NBA draft: 2006: undrafted
- Playing career: 2006–2022
- Position: Small forward
- Number: 33, 22

Career history
- 2007: Artland Dragons
- 2007: Sioux Falls Skyforce
- 2007–2008: Gran Canaria
- 2008–2009: Cajasol Sevilla
- 2009–2011: Estudiantes
- 2011–2012: Valencia
- 2012–2013: Maccabi Tel Aviv
- 2013–2014: Unicaja Málaga
- 2014–2016: Astana
- 2016–2017: AS Monaco
- 2017–2019: Estudiantes
- 2019–2020: Ibaraki Robots
- 2020–2022: Fos Provence Basket

Career highlights
- LNB Pro B champion (2021); All-EuroCup First Team (2012); All-EuroCup Second Team (2011); All-Spanish League First Team (2011); French League Cup winner (2017); 2× Third-team All-ACC (2005, 2006); Mr. Maine Basketball (2002)

Nik Caner-Medley (born October 20, 1983) is an Azerbaijani-American former professional basketball player. Caner-Medley played college basketball for the Maryland Terrapins.

== High school career ==
Caner-Medley graduated from Deering High School in Portland, Maine, in 2002. Among his achievements were NHSCA Boys Basketball Athlete of the Year, Maine's Mr. Basketball and the Maine Gatorade Player of the Year. A remarkable scorer as a senior, he tallied a school-record 51 points against South Portland, scored 47 points in consecutive games, had one game with 46 and another with 44 during his final high school campaign.

Caner-Medley led the Rams to back-to-back Western Maine titles and led the state in scoring in back-to-back seasons with a 36.5-point average in 2002 and a 26.8-point clip in 2001. He still holds the title of Deering's career scoring leader with 1,641 points and also led the Southwestern Maine Activities Association (SMAA) as a senior with 15.7 rebounds, along with 4.2 steals per game and 4.6 assists.

He was named "Maine Gatorade Player of the Year", and "Mr. Basketball" as a senior at Deering High School. He averaged 35.6 PPG as a senior and 26.8 PPG as a junior, both good for first in the state.

== Collegiate career ==
Caner-Medley became the first true freshman to start regularly at Maryland since Steve Blake in the 1999–2000 school year, totaling 18 starts in 31 games. As a small forward, he averaged 5.9 ppg and 3.5 rpg in his first collegiate season and averaged 6.0 ppg and 2.0 rpg in the Terps' three NCAA Tournament games despite missing most of the Michigan State match on March 28, 2003, after injuring his ankle. Among his post-season contributions were the 12 points and two rebounds in the NCAA Tournament opening win over UNC Wilmington.

As a sophomore, he was a Terp starter in all 32 contests, finishing third on the team in scoring with 12.2 points per game and was the Terps' high-scorer in eight games. His standout performance sparked the Terps in a win at No. 1 Florida on December 10, 2003, where he registered 22 points with six points in overtime and set or tied then-career bests in field goals attempted (16), 3-point field goals (3), 3-point field goals attempted (7), rebounds (13, previous career high was eight) and minutes played (43). He later earned the Maryland Basketball "Clutch Performance of the Year" Award for his effort against Florida.

During his junior year, Caner-Medley led the Terrapins in scoring (16.0 ppg), minutes (1,008), starts (31) and 3-point field goals made (43). He posted a double-digit scoring total in 27 of 32 games, recorded 10 games of 20 points or more and was Maryland's top scorer in 13 games. On January 15, 2005, he contributed a career-high 35 points to Maryland's win over Temple, in which he made 14-for-21 FG to eclipse his previous career-high by 12 points. He averaged a team-high 16.9 ppg in ACC contests, finished third on the team in rebounding (6.2 rpg) and second in steals (43), and notched four double-doubles on the season. He earned BB&T Classic all-tournament honors in December and was named ESPN.com National Player of the Week for his performance against Duke on January 31, 2005. Following the season, he was named to the All-ACC 3rd team.

Before his senior year, Caner-Medley scored in double-figures in each of the Terps' games during their tour of Italy. He again led the Terps in scoring at 15.3 ppg (16.3 during ACC competition), and tallied 6 rpg, and 2 apg. He shot 83% FT and 36% from the 3 point line. At the conclusion of the season, he was named team MVP and 3rd team All ACC. He finished his senior year #11 all-time in games played for Maryland, #8 in minutes, #13 in points scored (he was in the top ten of players with games of 30+ points), #18 in rebounds, #6 in assists by a forward or center (#27 overall), #11 in steals, #13 in blocks, #10 in 3s and #13 in steals. Caner-Medley was one of only five Maryland players (Walt Williams, Johnny Rhodes, Laron Profit and Terence Morris) to score over 1500 points, grab 500+ rebounds, record more than 200 assists, 100 steals, 100 3s and 50 blocks during his career at Maryland.

== Professional career ==
Caner-Medley was signed as a free agent by the Detroit Pistons after the 2006 NBA draft. He played with them in the 2006 Las Vegas Summer League until a stress fracture in his foot forced him to the sidelines for five months. After extensive rehabilitation, Caner-Medley fully recovered and signed with the Artland Dragons of the BBL1 in Germany in February 2007.

The Artland Dragons reached the league championship for the first time in club history during his stint with the team. Back in America, he played for the Sacramento Kings in the 2007 NBA Summer League in Las Vegas. He did not make an NBA roster, but on November 1, 2007, was selected sixth in the NBA Development League draft by the Sioux Falls Skyforce. In December 2007, despite averaging 22 points and 11.5 boards a game, Caner-Medley left the NBADL to pursue an opportunity overseas with Kalise Gran Canaria of the ACB, the top Spanish league.

In 2008, Caner-Medley again tried his luck in the NBA Summer League, this time with the Los Angeles Lakers. Unable to make the roster, he played the 2008–2009 season for the ACB's Cajasol Sevilla. He finished the year third in the league rebounding, posting an average of eight a game.

In the summer of 2009 Caner-Medley earned a spot on the Los Angeles Clippers' Summer League team in Las Vegas. He had two double-doubles in five games. He then signed for Estudiantes Madrid.

In the 2010/11 season, his second with Estudiantes, Caner-Medley averaged 14.4 points and 7.6 rebounds a game, the latter stat placing him first in the league. He also topped the Spanish league's player efficiency rankings—posting a 17.6 clip—and finished second in MVP voting, as well as earning a spot on the All-ACB first team. He was named ACB MVP of the month four times during his stay in Madrid, including three times in a row in 2011.

In July 2011, Caner-Medley signed with Power Electronics Valencia for one season with an option for a second year. After posting averages of 13.2 ppg and 6.8 rpg in the ACB and 13.5 ppg and 6.4 rpg in the EuroCup (including 23 points, 11 rebounds, 3 blocks and 2 steals for a 38 evaluation rating in the championship game), he opted out of his contract to explore free agency.

In July 2012, he signed a two-year deal with Maccabi Tel Aviv of the Israeli Super League.

On August 22, 2013, Caner-Medley signed a contract with Unicaja Málaga.

On June 26, 2014, he signed with BC Astana of the VTB United League.

On July 25, 2016, he signed with AS Monaco of the French LNB Pro A.

On June 8, 2017, Caner-Medley signed a two-year contract with CB Estudiantes of the Spanish Liga ACB.

On June 26, 2019, he signed a two-year deal with Cyberdyne Ibaraki Robots of the Japanese B.League.

== National team career ==
In April 2012, Caner-Medley received an Azerbaijani passport, and he played with their senior men's national team before the EuroBasket 2013's qualifying round.

== EuroLeague career statistics ==
Legend
GP	Games played	GS	Games started	MPG	Minutes per game
FG%	Field-goal percentage	3P%	3-point field-goal percentage	FT%	Free-throw percentage
RPG	Rebounds per game	APG	Assists per game	SPG	Steals per game
BPG	Blocks per game	PPG	Points per game	PIR	Performance index rating
**Bold**	Career high

Year	Team	GP	GS	MPG	FG%	3P%	FT%	RPG	APG	SPG	BPG	PPG	PIR
2012–13	Maccabi	**24**	17	13.8	.363	**.455**	.762	2.9	.5	.5	.3	4.0	4.9
2013–14	Unicaja	20	**20**	**26.3**	**.495**	.381	**.765**	**5.0**	**.9**	**.7**	**.6**	**12.4**	**13.8**
Career		44	37	19.5	.452	.406	.764	3.8	.7	.6	.4	7.9	9.0
