= EuroBasket 2009 =

International basketball event

Mistrzostwa Europy w Koszykówce Mężczyzn 2009

Tournament details
- Host country: Poland
- Dates: 7–20 September 2009
- Teams: 16
- Venues: 7 (in 7 host cities)

Final positions
- Champions: Spain (1st title)
- Runners-up: Serbia
- Third place: Greece
- Fourth place: Slovenia

Tournament statistics
- Games played: 54
- Attendance: 233,246 (4,319 per game)
- MVP: (Spain) Pau Gasol
- Top scorer: (Spain) Pau Gasol (18.7 ppg)
- Top rebounds: (Poland) Marcin Gortat (10.8 rpg)
- Top assists: (Serbia) Miloš Teodosić (5.2 apg)
- PPG (Team): Spain (79.8 ppg)
- RPG (Team): Bulgaria (38.3 rpg)
- APG (Team): Spain (17.3 apg)

Official website
- www.fiba.basketball

The 2009 FIBA European Championship, commonly called FIBA EuroBasket 2009, was the 36th FIBA EuroBasket regional basketball championship held by FIBA Europe. The tournament, which was hosted by Poland, began on 7 September and concluded with the final on 20 September 2009. The competition served as a qualification tournament for the 2010 FIBA World Championship in Turkey.

Spain claimed their first EuroBasket title by routing Serbia 85–63 in the final. Greece captured the bronze medal with a 57–56 victory over Slovenia. The four teams to make the semi-finals, plus France and Croatia claimed the six European qualifying places for the 2010 FIBA World Championship. Spain's Pau Gasol was named the tournament MVP.

== Venues ==
Host cities of the EuroBasket 2009.

The tournament was played at seven venues in seven cities throughout Poland. Each one of the total six groups in the preliminary and the qualifying round was hosted by a single arena, while the entire knockout stage was played at Spodek Arena, Katowice.

Gdańsk	Poznań	Warsaw	Wrocław
Hala Olivia; Capacity: 5,500	Hala Arena; Capacity: 5,000	Hala Torwar; Capacity: 5,000	Hala Stulecia; Capacity: 7,000

Bydgoszcz	Łódź	Katowice
Łuczniczka; Capacity: 8,000	Atlas Arena; Capacity: 13,400	Spodek; Capacity: 11,500

== Qualification ==
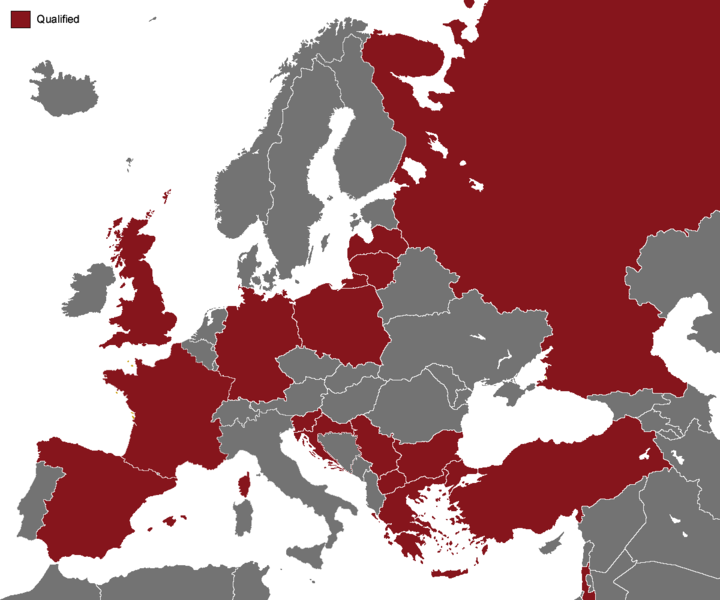
Countries that qualified for EuroBasket 2009 finals

The draw for the qualifying round took place on 16 February 2008 in Venice, Italy. Poland, as host nation, and the seven top-placed nations in EuroBasket 2007 automatically qualified for the tournament finals. From the qualifying round, the winners of the four groups and the three best second-place teams also advanced to the final round of the event. The ten teams who participated in the qualifying round and did not succeed in going through to the final round had been ranked according to their win–loss records, their win–loss percentages and their goal average coefficients. The first six teams took part in an additional qualifying round, held from 5 to 30 August 2009, the winner of which secured the last ticket for the final tournament.

=== Qualified teams ===
Country	Qualified as	Date qualification was secured
Poland	Host nation	28 November 2004
Russia	1st in EuroBasket 2007	13 September 2007
Spain	2nd in EuroBasket 2007	13 September 2007
Lithuania	3rd in EuroBasket 2007	14 September 2007
Greece	4th in EuroBasket 2007	14 September 2007
Germany	5th in EuroBasket 2007	15 September 2007
Croatia	6th in EuroBasket 2007	15 September 2007
Slovenia	7th in EuroBasket 2007	16 September 2007
Serbia	Group A winner in qualifying round	17 September 2008
North Macedonia	Group B winner in qualifying round	20 September 2008
Turkey	Group C winner in qualifying round	17 September 2008
Great Britain	Group D winner in qualifying round	17 September 2008
Latvia	Best group runner-up in qualifying round	20 September 2008
Israel	second-best group runner-up in qualifying round	20 September 2008
Bulgaria	third-best group runner-up in qualifying round	20 September 2008
France	Additional qualifying round winner	30 August 2009

== Seeding ==
The draw for the groups of the final tournament took place on 8 November 2008 in Warsaw, Poland. The finalists were divided into four seeding pots, based on the results of the teams in the most recent FIBA Europe official competitions, with the last competition being the most important. Teams from the same group of seeds cannot be drawn against each other.

Pot A
Team	Last FIBA result
Russia	1st EuroBasket 2007
Spain	2nd EuroBasket 2007
Lithuania	3rd EuroBasket 2007
Greece	4th EuroBasket 2007

Pot B
Team	Last FIBA result
Germany	5th EuroBasket 2007
Croatia	6th EuroBasket 2007
Slovenia	7th EuroBasket 2007
Turkey	qualifying, record 6–0

Pot C
Team	Last FIBA result
Serbia	qualifying, record 7–1
Poland	h., 13–16th EuroBasket 2007
North Macedonia	qualifying, r. 4–2, a. 1.1173
Latvia	qualifying, r. 4–2, a. 1.1031

Pot D
Team	Last FIBA result
Great Britain	qualifying, r. 4–2, a. 1.0456
Israel	qualifying, record 3–3
Bulgaria	qualifying, record 4–4
France	additional qualifying

h Host

r Record, win–loss

a Goal average coefficient, points for/points against

== Squads ==
Each nation fielded a roster of twelve players for the tournament. FIBA rules allow one naturalized player per team. Nineteen players currently on NBA rosters participated in the tournament. France (Tony Parker, Ronny Turiaf, Boris Diaw, Ian Mahinmi, and Nicolas Batum) led the way with five NBA players participating on the team.

== Mascot ==
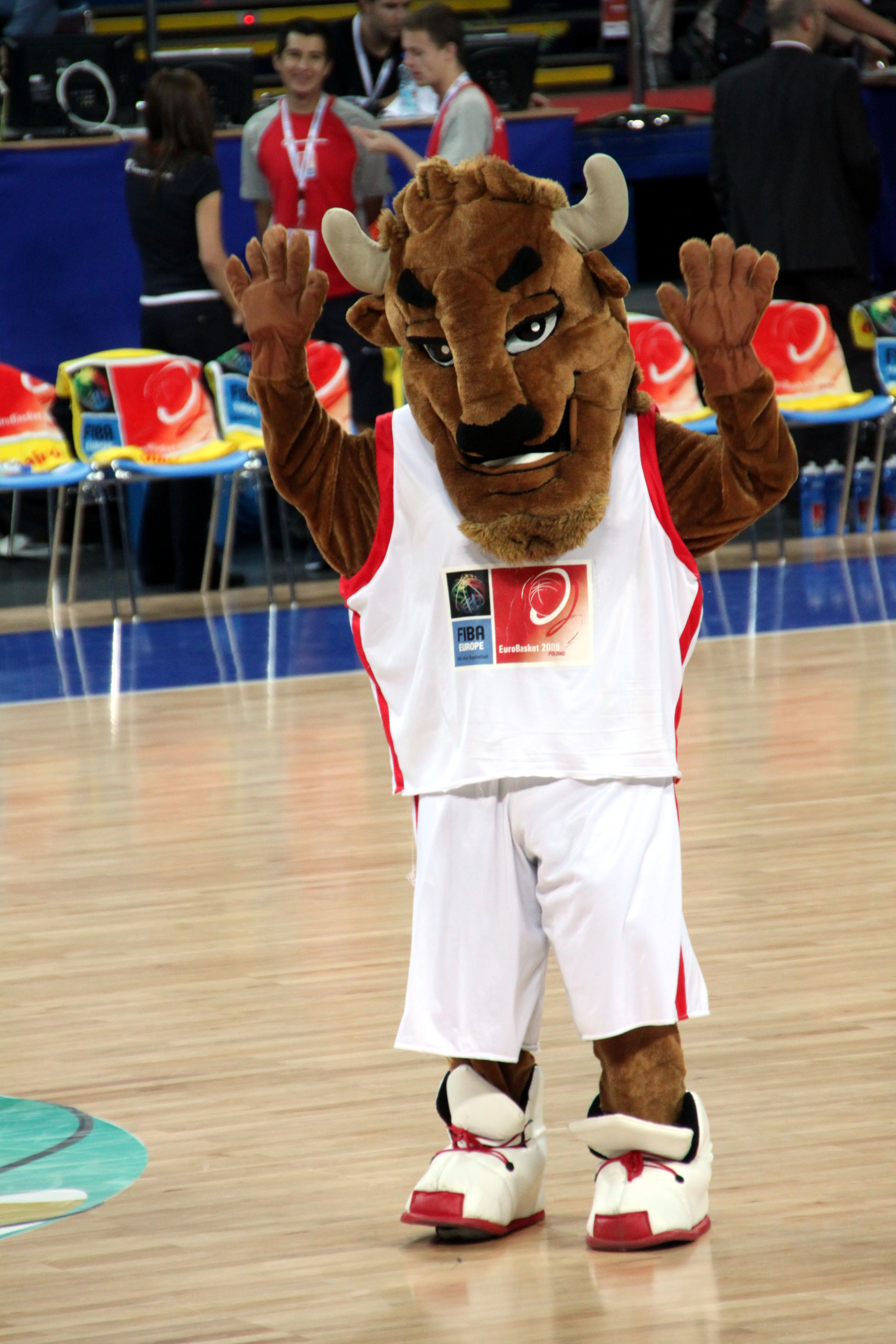
Mieszko

The Polish Basketball Federation and the Local Organising Committee of EuroBasket 2009 announced at a press conference in Warsaw that they have chosen the European Bison as the official mascot of EuroBasket 2009. The European bison (Polish: Żubr) is the largest wild animal to be found in Poland's forests. It is estimated that almost one fifth of the world's population of bisons is actually living in Poland. The animal is known for its calm attitude, while its posture and horns are associated with strength and dignity. The name chosen for the event's official mascot is Mieszko. The name has historical significance as it is the name of the first documented Polish ruler who united Poland in the 10th century. Mieszko is wearing a white jersey that shows the logo of the tournament and white shorts with a number 9. There is red on the sides of the jersey and shorts. His footwear is white with red laces. He is also holding a basketball that says "EuroBasket 2009".

== Results ==
=== First round ===
==== Group A ====
Venue: Hala Arena, Poznań

Team	Pld	W	L	PF	PA	PD	Pts
Greece	3	3	0	268	202	+66	6
Croatia	3	2	1	235	226	+9	5
North Macedonia	3	1	2	207	246	−39	4
Israel	3	0	3	238	274	−36	3

7 September
16:30

Report

North Macedonia	54–86	Greece
Scoring by quarter: 13–28, 15–24, 9–17, 17–17
Pts: Massey 12; Rebs: Gečevski 6 Asts: Stefanov 4		Pts: Spanoulis 17; Rebs: Bourousis 8 Asts: Calathes 5

Attendance: 1,900
Referees: Ivo Dolinek (CZE), Ilija Belošević (SRB), Jakub Zamojski (POL)

7 September
19:15

Report

Croatia	86–79	Israel
Scoring by quarter: 25–17, 17–20, 17–22, 27–20
Pts: Vujčić 21; Rebs: Kasun, Planinić 7 Asts: Planinić 3		Pts: Eliyahu 31; Rebs: Eliyahu 6 Asts: Halperin 4

Attendance: 1,600
Referees: Daniel Hierrezuelo (ESP), Zoran Šutulović (MNE), Dimitar Gologanov (BUL)

8 September
16:30

Report

Israel	79–82	North Macedonia
Scoring by quarter: 19–17, 20–23, 16–20, 24–22
Pts: Burstein 25; Rebs: Mekel 7 Asts: Burstein, Eliyahu 4		Pts: Antić 19; Rebs: Stefanov 8 Asts: Stefanov 4

Attendance: 1,600
Referees: Ilija Belošević (SRB), Daniel Hierrezuelo (ESP), Matej Boltauzer (SLO)

8 September
19:15

Report

Greece	76–68	Croatia
Scoring by quarter: 20–15, 32–16, 13–16, 11–21
Pts: Bourousis 19; Rebs: Bourousis 8 Asts: Spanoulis 3		Pts: Ukić 15; Rebs: Banić 7 Asts: Planinić 5

Attendance: 2,500
Referees: Zoran Šutulović (MNE), Ivo Dolinek (CZE), Dimitar Gologanov (BUL)

9 September
16:30

Report

North Macedonia	71–81	Croatia
Scoring by quarter: 26–20, 22–14, 13–22, 10–25
Pts: Stefanov, Sokolov, Massey 12; Rebs: Antić, Massey 10; Asts: Stefanov 5		Pts: Vujčić 12; Rebs: Rozić 6 Asts: Planinić 7

Attendance: 2,500
Referees: Ivo Dolinek (CZE), Daniel Hierrezuelo (ESP), Matej Boltauzer (SLO)

9 September
19:15

Report

Israel	80–106	Greece
Scoring by quarter: 25–31, 17–25, 23–23, 15–27
Pts: Eliyahu 21; Rebs: Green, Eliyahu 8 Asts: Eliyahu 4		Pts: Spanoulis 18; Rebs: Koufos 8 Asts: Spanoulis 5

Attendance: 1,200
Referees: Ilija Belošević (SRB), Zoran Šutulović (MNE), Jakub Zamojski (POL)

==== Group B ====
Venue: Hala Olivia, Gdańsk

Team	Pld	W	L	PF	PA	PD	Pts	Tie
France	3	3	0	199	180	+19	6	
Russia	3	1	2	218	213	+5	4	1–1, 1.069
Germany	3	1	2	203	211	−8	4	1–1, 0.979
Latvia	3	1	2	187	203	−16	4	1–1, 0.951

7 September
16:30

Report

Russia	81–68	Latvia
Scoring by quarter: 28–21, 11–15, 19–16, 23–16
Pts: McCarty 24; Rebs: McCarty 9 Asts: Monia 5		Pts: Kambala 22; Rebs: Biedriņš 6 Asts: Valters 5

Attendance: 4,000
Referees: Juan Arteaga (ESP), Roger Harrison (ENG), Damir Javor (SLO)

7 September
19:15

Report

France	70–65	Germany
Scoring by quarter: 14–17, 19–20, 17–11, 20–17
Pts: Parker 19; Rebs: Turiaf 14; Asts: Parker 4		Pts: Schultze 13; Rebs: Femerling 8 Asts: Hamann 5

Attendance: 3,000
Referees: Milivoje Jovčić (SRB), Marek Ćmikiewicz (POL), Engin Kennerman (TUR)

8 September
16:30

Report

Germany	76–73	Russia
Scoring by quarter: 26–12, 19–19, 15–19, 16–23
Pts: Jagla 19; Rebs: Jagla 11; Asts: Hamann, Schaffartzik 4		Pts: McCarty, Ponkrashov 12; Rebs: McCarty 6 Asts: Bykov 3

Attendance: 3,000
Referees: Milivoje Jovčić (SRB), Damir Javor (SLO), Engin Kennerman (TUR)

8 September
19:15

Report

Latvia	51–60	France
Scoring by quarter: 8–13, 13–3, 16–25, 14–19
Pts: Kambala 18; Rebs: Biedriņš 20; Asts: Valters 3		Pts: Parker 22; Rebs: Batum 8 Asts: Diaw 5

Attendance: 4,700
Referees: Juan Arteaga (ESP), Marek Ćmikiewicz (POL), Tomas Jasevičius (LTU)

9 September
16:30

Report

Russia	64–69	France
Scoring by quarter: 17–15, 18–19, 16–18, 13–17
Pts: McCarty 13; Rebs: Mozgov 5 Asts: Ponkrashov 8		Pts: Diaw 19; Rebs: Turiaf 14; Asts: Diaw 7

Attendance: 3,000
Referees: Juan Arteaga (ESP), Milivoje Jovčić (SRB), Roger Harrison (ENG)

9 September
19:15

Report

Germany	62–68	Latvia
Scoring by quarter: 13–14, 16–23, 13–14, 20–17
Pts: Greene 16; Rebs: Jagla 7 Asts: Schaffartzik 5		Pts: Janičenoks 14; Rebs: Biedriņš 9 Asts: Helmanis 5

Attendance: 4,000
Referees: Marek Ćmikiewicz (POL), Tomas Jasevičius (LTU), Damir Javor (SLO)

==== Group C ====
Venue: Hala Torwar, Warsaw

Team	Pld	W	L	PF	PA	PD	Pts	Tie
Slovenia	3	2	1	236	218	+18	5	1–1, 1.031
Serbia	3	2	1	212	196	+16	5	1–1, 0.985
Spain	3	2	1	231	226	+5	5	1–1, 0.980
Great Britain	3	0	3	194	233	−39	3	

7 September
18:15

Report

Great Britain	59–72	Slovenia
Scoring by quarter: 15–27, 20–10, 12–14, 12–21
Pts: Mensah-Bonsu 18; Rebs: Mensah-Bonsu 6 Asts: Archibald 5		Pts: E. Lorbek 19; Rebs: Nachbar, Lakovič 6 Asts: Lakovič 6

Attendance: 3,054
Referees: Lazaros Voreadis (GRE), David Chambon (FRA), Borys Ryzhyk (UKR)

7 September
21:00

Report

Serbia	66–57	Spain
Scoring by quarter: 15–12, 23–11, 18–14, 10–20
Pts: Krstić 17; Rebs: Veličković 8 Asts: Teodosić 3		Pts: Navarro 14; Rebs: M. Gasol 9 Asts: López, Rubio 3

Attendance: 3,600
Referees: Romualdas Brazauskas (LTU), Robert Lottermoser (GER), Oļegs Latiševs (LAT)

8 September
18:15

Report

Slovenia	80–69	Serbia
Scoring by quarter: 22–15, 17–14, 21–15, 20–25
Pts: Nachbar 17; Rebs: Nachbar 9 Asts: E. Lorbek 4		Pts: Teodosić 14; Rebs: Tepić, Bjelica 5 Asts: Teodosić 6

Attendance: 4,208
Referees: Romualdas Brazauskas (LTU), Lazaros Voreadis (GRE), Sergey Mikhaylov (RUS)

8 September
21:00

Report

Spain	84–76	Great Britain
Scoring by quarter: 25–15, 19–20, 22–21, 18–20
Pts: P. Gasol 27; Rebs: P. Gasol 11; Asts: Rubio 6		Pts: Hart 15; Rebs: Hart 8 Asts: Hart 3

Attendance: 2,300
Referees: Robert Lottermoser (GER), David Chambon (FRA), Borys Ryzhyk (UKR)

9 September
18:15

Report

Spain	90–84 (OT)	Slovenia
Scoring by quarter: 18–20, 25–15, 19–14, 16–29, Overtime: 12–6
Pts: Navarro 21; Rebs: P. Gasol 9 Asts: Navarro, P. Gasol, Cabezas 3		Pts: Dragić 19; Rebs: E. Lorbek 10; Asts: Lakovič 3

Attendance: 3,471
Referees: Romualdas Brazauskas (LTU), David Chambon (FRA), Oļegs Latiševs (LAT)

9 September
21:15

Report

Great Britain	59–77	Serbia
Scoring by quarter: 12–21, 17–18, 15–19, 15–19
Pts: Reinking 21; Rebs: Archibald 7 Asts: Sullivan 3		Pts: Krstić, Tepić 17; Rebs: Bjelica 8 Asts: Teodosić 4

Attendance: 1,863
Referees: Lazaros Voreadis (GRE), Robert Lottermoser, (GER), Sergey Mikhaylov (RUS)

==== Group D ====
Venue: Hala Stulecia, Wrocław

Team	Pld	W	L	PF	PA	PD	Pts
Turkey	3	3	0	265	211	+54	6
Poland	3	2	1	245	240	+5	5
Lithuania	3	1	2	235	239	−4	4
Bulgaria	3	0	3	213	268	−55	3

7 September
18:15

Report

Poland	90–78	Bulgaria
Scoring by quarter: 32–21, 20–16, 23–21, 15–20
Pts: Logan 23; Rebs: Gortat 10; Asts: Logan 9		Pts: Rowland 20; Rebs: Evtimov 10; Asts: Stoykov, Videnov 3

Attendance: 7,000
Referees: Shmuel Bachar (ISR), Christos Christodoulou (GRE), Ademir Zurapović (BIH)

7 September
21:15

Report

Turkey	84–76	Lithuania
Scoring by quarter: 19–22, 20–17, 24–19, 21–18
Pts: Türkoğlu 19; Rebs: İlyasova 6 Asts: Türkoğlu, Arslan 3		Pts: Petravičius 21; Rebs: D. Lavrinovič, Kleiza 4 Asts: Delininkaitis 3

Attendance: 7,000
Referees: Sreten Radović (CRO), Guerrino Cerebuch (ITA), Fernando Rocha (POR)

8 September
18:15

Report

Lithuania	75–86	Poland
Scoring by quarter: 23–25, 9–17, 18–18, 25–26
Pts: Jasaitis 21; Rebs: Kleiza 7 Asts: Jomantas 5		Pts: Lampe 22; Rebs: Gortat 17; Asts: Szubarga 8

Attendance: 7,000
Referees: Christos Christodoulou (GRE), Sreten Radović (CRO), Aleksandar Milojevik (MKD)

8 September
21:15

Report

Bulgaria	66–94	Turkey
Scoring by quarter: 15–24, 13–29, 24–19, 14–22
Pts: Rowland 15; Rebs: Stoykov 6 Asts: Rowland 4		Pts: Arslan 17; Rebs: Savaş, İlyasova, Aşık 7 Asts: Tunçeri 7

Attendance: 2,600
Referees: Guerrino Cerebuch (ITA), Shmuel Bachar (ISR), Fernando Rocha (POR)

9 September
18:15

Report

Poland	69–87	Turkey
Scoring by quarter: 17–24, 17–21, 21–21, 14–21
Pts: Gortat 21; Rebs: Lampe, Gortat 7 Asts: Logan 4		Pts: Aşık 22; Rebs: Türkoğlu, İlyasova, Aşık 8 Asts: Tunçeri 4

Attendance: 7,000
Referees: Shmuel Bachar (ISR), Sreten Radović (CRO), Aleksandar Milojevik (MKD)

9 September
21:15

Report

Lithuania	84–69	Bulgaria
Scoring by quarter: 25–22, 16–19, 16–15, 27–13
Pts: K. Lavrinovič 16; Rebs: Petravičius 8 Asts: K. Lavrinovič, Jomantas 4		Pts: Rowland 18; Rebs: Evtimov 13; Asts: Rowland 3

Attendance: 3,700
Referees: Christos Christodoulou (GRE), Guerrino Cerebuch (ITA), Ademir Zurapović (BIH)

=== Second round ===
==== Group E ====
Venue: Łuczniczka, Bydgoszcz

Team	Pld	W	L	PF	PA	PD	Pts	Tie
France	5	5	0	380	334	+46	10	
Russia	5	3	2	338	338	0	8	1–0
Greece	5	3	2	380	337	+43	8	0–1
Croatia	5	2	3	357	364	−7	7	
North Macedonia	5	1	4	337	396	−59	6	1–0
Germany	5	1	4	360	383	−23	6	0–1

11 September
15:45

Report

Russia	62–59	Croatia
Scoring by quarter: 16–16, 12–10, 14–16, 20–17
Pts: Mozgov 18; Rebs: Mozgov 8 Asts: Bykov 7		Pts: Kasun 13; Rebs: Banić 7 Asts: Vujčić, Ukić, Planinić 3

Attendance: 1,500
Referees: Ilija Belošević (SRB), Marek Ćmikiewicz (POL), Matej Boltauzer (SLO)

11 September
18:15

Report

Germany	76–84	Greece
Scoring by quarter: 19–25, 14–16, 17–20, 26–23
Pts: Schaffartzik 23; Rebs: Jagla 7 Asts: Hamann, Schaffartzik 3		Pts: Spanoulis 20; Rebs: Perperoglou 5 Asts: Spanoulis 7

Attendance: 2,000
Referees: Juan Arteaga (ESP), Milivoje Jovčić (SRB), Dimitar Gologanov (BUL)

11 September
21:00

Report

France	83–57	North Macedonia
Scoring by quarter: 24–9, 25–9, 18–17, 16–22
Pts: Piétrus, de Colo 14; Rebs: Traore 6 Asts: Diaw 4		Pts: Gečevski, Sokolov, Massey 9 Rebs: Samardžiski 8 Asts: 7 tied with 1

Attendance: 2,000
Referees: Romualdas Brazauskas (LTU), Damir Javor (SLO), Engin Kennerman (TUR)

13 September
15:45

Report

North Macedonia	86–75	Germany
Scoring by quarter: 18–14, 18–22, 26–14, 24–25
Pts: V. Stefanov 25; Rebs: Gečevski, Antić 6 Asts: Mirakovski 3		Pts: Staiger 14; Rebs: Schultze 7 Asts: Schaffartzik 5

Attendance: 2,500
Referees: Daniel Hierrezuelo (ESP), Tomas Jasevičius (LTU), Matej Boltauzer (SLO)

13 September
18:15

Report

Greece	65–68	Russia
Scoring by quarter: 12–21, 20–18, 15–9, 18–20
Pts: Schortsanitis 13; Rebs: Fotsis 9 Asts: Spanoulis 7		Pts: McCarty 17; Rebs: McCarty 9 Asts: Ponkrashov 7

Attendance: 3,500
Referees: Ivo Dolinek (CZE), Damir Javor (SLO), Jakub Zamojski (POL)

13 September
21:00

Report

Croatia	79–87	France
Scoring by quarter: 21–19, 25–22, 10–22, 23–24
Pts: Popović 30; Rebs: Stojić 5 Asts: Kus, Planinić 3		Pts: Parker 24; Rebs: Parker 6 Asts: Parker, Diaw 6

Attendance: 3,000
Referees: Milivoje Jovčić (SRB), Marek Ćmikiewicz (POL), Roger Harrison (ENG)

15 September
15:45

Report

Russia	71–69	North Macedonia
Scoring by quarter: 14–10, 19–19, 16–20, 22–20
Pts: Mozgov 25; Rebs: Mozgov 11; Asts: Ponkrashov 7		Pts: Antić 19; Rebs: Antić 10; Asts: Stefanov 4

Attendance: 2,000
Referees: Juan Arteaga (ESP), Milivoje Jovčić (SRB), Engin Kennerman (TUR)

15 September
18:15

Report

France	71–69	Greece
Scoring by quarter: 18–21, 23–13, 15–19, 15–16
Pts: Koffi 14; Rebs: Koffi 6 Asts: Jeanneau, Parker, Traore 2		Pts: Spanoulis 16; Rebs: Bourousis 10; Asts: Perperoglou 4

Attendance: 2,500
Referees: Ilija Belošević (SRB), Daniel Hierrezuelo (ESP), Tomas Jasevičius (LTU)

15 September
21:00

Report

Germany	68–70	Croatia
Scoring by quarter: 19–20, 13–17, 18–12, 18–21
Pts: Schaffartzik 18; Rebs: Jagla 5 Asts: Hamann 7		Pts: Ukić 18; Rebs: Banić 7 Asts: Planinić 4

Attendance: 2,000
Referees: Romualdas Brazauskas (LTU), Ivo Dolinek (CZE), Matej Boltauzer (SLO)

==== Group F ====
Venue: Atlas Arena, Łódź

Team	Pld	W	L	PF	PA	PD	Pts	Tie
Slovenia	5	4	1	390	344	+46	9	1–0
Turkey	5	4	1	370	338	+32	9	0–1
Serbia	5	3	2	365	357	+8	8	1–0
Spain	5	3	2	381	351	+30	8	0–1
Poland	5	1	4	355	405	−50	6	
Lithuania	5	0	5	358	424	−66	5	

12 September
15:45

Report

Turkey	63–60	Spain
Scoring by quarter: 20–22, 16–12, 13–14, 14–12
Pts: İlyasova 15; Rebs: Erden 6 Asts: Türkoğlu 3		Pts: P. Gasol, Fernández 16; Rebs: P. Gasol 9 Asts: Navarro, Rubio 3

Attendance: 8,200
Referees: Shmuel Bachar (ISR), Sreten Radović (CRO), Robert Lottermoser (GER)

12 September
18:15

Report

Poland	72–77	Serbia
Scoring by quarter: 22–23, 14–20, 17–19, 19–15
Pts: Koszarek, Gortat 16; Rebs: Gortat 9 Asts: Logan 6		Pts: Krstić 18; Rebs: Krstić 8 Asts: Teodosić 4

Attendance: 10,100
Referees: Christos Christodoulou (GRE), Guerrino Cerebuch (ITA), Fernando Rocha (POR)

12 September
21:00

Report

Lithuania	58–81	Slovenia
Scoring by quarter: 18–28, 8–15, 13–19, 19–19
Pts: Kalnietis 15; Rebs: K. Lavrinovič 7 Asts: Kleiza 3		Pts: Lakovič 24; Rebs: E. Lorbek 8 Asts: Golemac 5

Attendance: 7,700
Referees: Zoran Šutulović (MNE), Lazaros Voreadis (GRE), Oļegs Latiševs (LAT)

14 September
15:45

Report

Spain	84–70	Lithuania
Scoring by quarter: 15–24, 25–8, 24–11, 20–27
Pts: P. Gasol 19; Rebs: P. Gasol 8 Asts: Rubio 9		Pts: Petravičius 13; Rebs: Petravičius 8 Asts: Delininkaitis 5

Attendance: 7,050
Referees: Sreten Radović (CRO), Zoran Šutulović (MNE), Ademir Zurapović (BIH)

14 September
18:15

Report

Slovenia	76–60	Poland
Scoring by quarter: 11–17, 20–12, 22–11, 23–20
Pts: E. Lorbek 20; Rebs: E. Lorbek 9 Asts: Lakovič 6		Pts: Szewczyk, Logan 15; Rebs: Gortat 10; Asts: Koszarek 4

Attendance: 8,100
Referees: Shmuel Bachar (ISR), David Chambon (FRA), Aleksandar Milojevik (MKD)

14 September
21:00

Report

Serbia	64–69 (OT)	Turkey
Scoring by quarter: 18–20, 15–16, 19–19, 12–9, Overtime: 0–5
Pts: Teodosić 16; Rebs: Bjelica 8 Asts: Teodosić 8		Pts: İlyasova 22; Rebs: İlyasova 11; Asts: Tunçeri 7

Attendance: 5,900
Referees: Guerrino Cerebuch (ITA), Lazaros Voreadis (GRE), Sergey Mikhaylov (RUS)

16 September
15:45

Report

Lithuania	79–89	Serbia
Scoring by quarter: 19–23, 18–18, 24–22, 18–26
Pts: Mačiulis 20; Rebs: D. Lavrinovič 8 Asts: Delininkaitis 4		Pts: Teodosić 20; Rebs: Bjelica 8 Asts: Teodosić 12

Attendance: 4,200
Referees: Christos Christodoulou (GRE), Fernando Rocha (POR), David Chambon (FRA)

16 September
18:15

Report

Poland	68–90	Spain
Scoring by quarter: 14–23, 12–19, 20–29, 22–19
Pts: Logan 20; Rebs: Gortat 12; Asts: Koszarek 7		Pts: Navarro 23; Rebs: Reyes, M. Gasol 7 Asts: Rubio 4

Attendance: 8,300
Referees: Lazaros Voreadis (GRE), Shmuel Bachar (ISR), Oļegs Latiševs (LAT)

16 September
21:00

Report

Turkey	67–69	Slovenia
Scoring by quarter: 15–24, 17–15, 20–18, 15–12
Pts: İlyasova 16; Rebs: İlyasova 7 Asts: İlyasova 4		Pts: Nachbar 16; Rebs: E. Lorbek 6 Asts: E. Lorbek 5

Attendance: 3,900
Referees: Zoran Šutulović (MNE), Borys Ryzhyk (UKR), Robert Lottermoser (GER)

=== Knockout stage ===
Quarter-finals
17 September
France	66
Spain	86
18 September
Turkey	74
Greece (OT)	76
17 September
Russia	68
Serbia	79
18 September
Slovenia	67
Croatia	65

Semi-finals
19 September
Spain	82
Greece	64
19 September
Serbia (OT)	96
Slovenia	92

Final
20 September
Spain	85
Serbia	63
Third place
20 September
Greece	57
Slovenia	56

5th place bracket

Semi-finals
19 September
France	80
Turkey	68
19 September
Russia	69
Croatia	76

Fifth place
20 September
France	69
Croatia	62
Seventh place
20 September
Turkey	66
Russia	89

==== Quarterfinals ====
17 September
18:15

Report

Russia	68–79	Serbia
Scoring by quarter: 24–21, 4–20, 15–13, 25–25
Pts: Fridzon 15; Rebs: Mozgov 6 Asts: Ponkrashov 4		Pts: Tripković 18; Rebs: Veličković, Paunić, Bjelica 5 Asts: Teodosić

Spodek, Katowice
Attendance: 4,000
Referees: Juan Arteaga (ESP), Christos Christodoulou (GRE), Ivo Dolinek (CZE)

17 September
21:00

Report

France	66–86	Spain
Scoring by quarter: 15–25, 17–22, 20–26, 14–13
Pts: Turiaf 12; Rebs: Diaw 6 Asts: Parker 3		Pts: P. Gasol 28; Rebs: P. Gasol 9 Asts: Navarro, Rubio 4

Spodek, Katowice
Attendance: 6,000
Referees: Ilija Belošević (SRB), Zoran Šutulović (MNE), Sreten Radović (CRO)

18 September
18:15

Report

Turkey	74–76 (OT)	Greece
Scoring by quarter: 14–17, 12–12, 20–18, 19–18, Overtime: 9–11
Pts: Türkoğlu, Onan 13; Rebs: İlyasova 7 Asts: Tunçeri 5		Pts: Spanoulis 23; Rebs: Fotsis 13; Asts: Spanoulis 7

Spodek, Katowice
Attendance: 6,000
Referees: Shmuel Bachar (ISR), Guerrino Cerebuch (ITA), Milivoje Jovcic (SRB)

18 September
21:00

Report

Slovenia	67–65	Croatia
Scoring by quarter: 18–25, 21–22, 14–3, 14–15
Pts: E. Lorbek 27; Rebs: E. Lorbek 8 Asts: Lakovič 5		Pts: Ukić 21; Rebs: 7 tied with 3 Asts: Ukić 5

Spodek, Katowice
Attendance: 5,500
Referees: Romualdas Brazauskas (LTU), Lazaros Voreadis (GRE), Daniel Hierrezuelo (ESP)

==== Classification 5–8 ====
19 September
12:00

Report

France	80–68	Turkey
Scoring by quarter: 12–26, 20–17, 29–16, 19–9
Pts: Parker 28; Rebs: Piétrus 6 Asts: Parker 10		Pts: Türkoğlu 13; Rebs: Aşık 9 Asts: Tunçeri, Türkoğlu 3

Spodek, Katowice
Attendance: 1,500
Referees: Daniel Hierrezuelo (ESP), Milivoje Jovcic (SRB), Olegs Latisevs (LAT)

19 September
14:15

Report

Russia	69–76	Croatia
Scoring by quarter: 14–18, 27–15, 15–25, 13–18
Pts: Monya 18; Rebs: McCarty 7 Asts: Bykov, Ponkrashov 5		Pts: Ukić 18; Rebs: Kus 5 Asts: Ukić 8

Spodek, Katowice
Attendance: 1,500
Referees: Christos Christodoulou (GRE), Zoran Sutulovic (MNE), Fernando Rocha (POR)

==== Semifinals ====
19 September
18:30

Report

Spain	82–64	Greece
Scoring by quarter: 26–21, 23–19, 15–11, 18–13
Pts: P. Gasol 18; Rebs: Reyes 7 Asts: Cabezas 4		Pts: Bourousis 11; Rebs: Fotsis 10; Asts: Spanoulis, Bourousis, Calathes 2

Spodek, Katowice
Attendance: 8,000
Referees: Guerrino Cerebuch (ITA), Ilija Belošević (SRB), Robert Lottermoser (GER)

19 September
21:00

Report

Serbia	96–92 (OT)	Slovenia
Scoring by quarter: 11–19, 24–26, 21–12, 23–22, Overtime: 17–13
Pts: Teodosić 32; Rebs: Marković 8 Asts: Teodosić, Veličković, Marković 4		Pts: E. Lorbek 25; Rebs: E. Lorbek 10; Asts: Lakovič 5

Spodek, Katowice
Attendance: 8,500
Referees: Juan Arteaga (ESP), Sreten Radovic (CRO), Tomas Jasevicius (LTU)

==== Seventh place game ====
20 September
14:15

Report

Turkey	66–89	Russia
Scoring by quarter: 18–26, 22–25, 19–17, 7–21
Pts: Aşık 24; Rebs: Aşık 11; Asts: Atsür 5		Pts: Fridzon 26; Rebs: Kurbanov 7 Asts: Ponkrashov, Kurbanov 7

Spodek, Katowice
Attendance: 1,000

==== Fifth place game ====
20 September
12:00

Report

France	69–62	Croatia
Scoring by quarter: 21–12, 13–12, 12–17, 23–21
Pts: Diot 18; Rebs: Koffi 8 Asts: Batum 8		Pts: Kus 18; Rebs: Nicević 8 Asts: Popović 8

Spodek, Katowice
Attendance: 2,000

==== Third place game ====
20 September
18:30

Report

Greece	57–56	Slovenia
Scoring by quarter: 16–13, 15–11, 11–13, 15–19
Pts: Schortsanitis 23; Rebs: Bourousis 7 Asts: Calathes 4		Pts: Lakovič 16; Rebs: E. Lorbek 9 Asts: Slokar 4

Spodek, Katowice
Attendance: 9,000

==== Final ====
20 September
21:15

Report

Spain	85–63	Serbia
Scoring by quarter: 24–14, 28–15, 15–15, 18–19
Pts: P. Gasol 18; Rebs: P. Gasol 11; Asts: Garbajosa 4		Pts: Tripković & Veličković 15; Rebs: Veličković 5 Asts: Krstić 3

Spodek, Katowice
Attendance: 10,000
Referees: Romualdas Brazauskas (LTU), Shmuel Bachar (ISR), Lazaros Voreadis (GRE)

The final was a rematch of each team's opening game, with the Spaniards attempting to avenge their 66–57 upset loss to the Serbs. Spain raced to a double-digit lead early in the first quarter, en route to an unassailable 52–29 lead at halftime. Serbia didn't catch up to hand Spain their first European Championship. Pau Gasol had a double-double with 18 points and 11 rebounds. Teammate Rudy Fernandez added 13 points and five rebounds. Uroš Tripković and Novica Veličković had 15 points each in a losing effort for the Serbs.

EuroBasket 2009 champions

Spain
First title

== Final standings ==
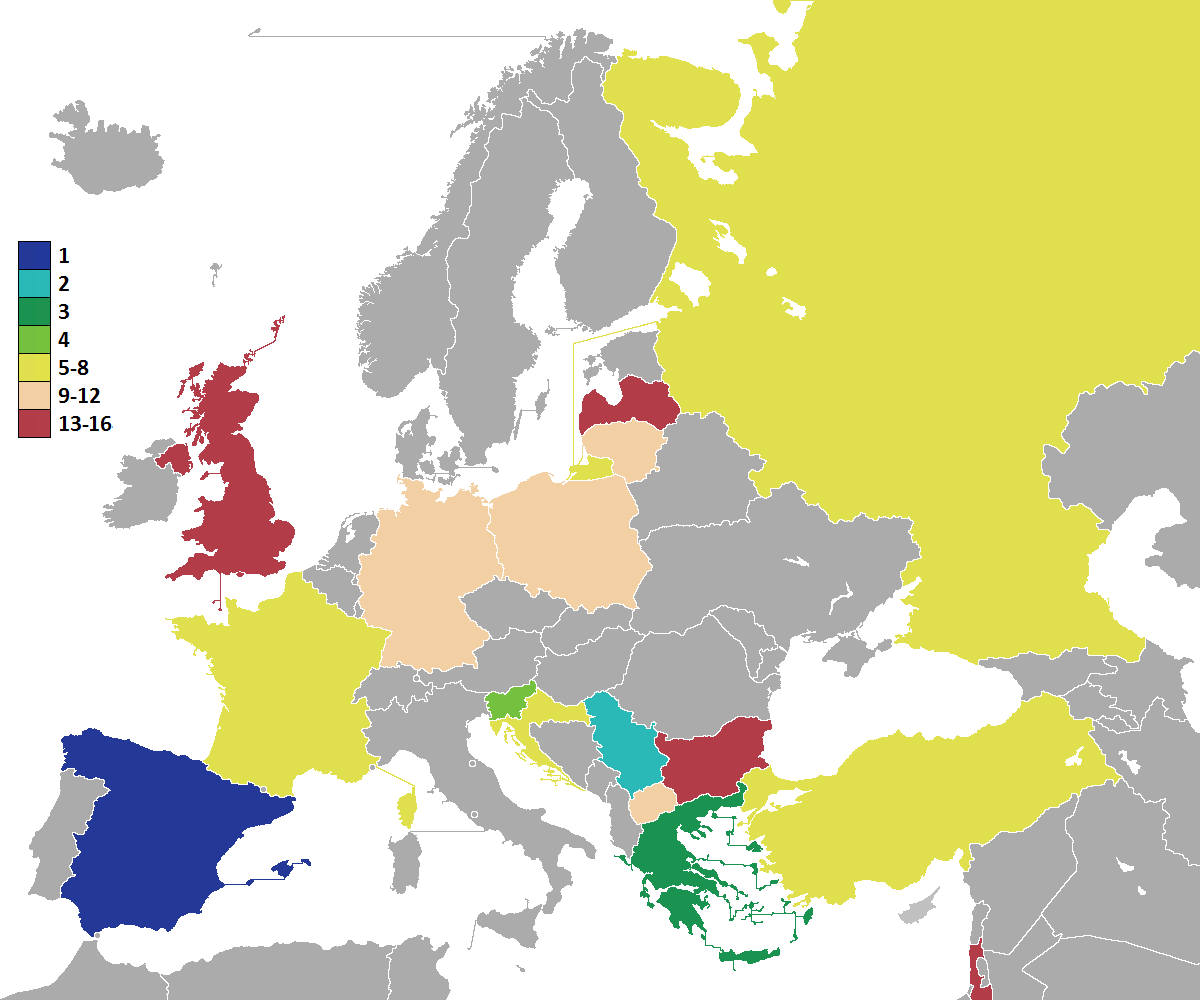
Results

Automatic Qualifier for the 2010 FIBA World Championship.
Wild card for the 2010 FIBA World Championship.

Rank	Team	Record
1st place, gold medalist(s)	Spain	7–2
2nd place, silver medalist(s)	Serbia	6–3
3rd place, bronze medalist(s)	Greece	6–3
4	Slovenia	6–3
5	France	8–1
6	Croatia	4–5
7	Russia	5–4
8	Turkey	5–4
9–10	North Macedonia	2–4
9–10	Poland	2–4
11–12	Germany	1–5
11–12	Lithuania	1–5
13–16	Latvia	1–2
13–16	Israel	0–3
13–16	Great Britain	0–3
13–16	Bulgaria	0–3

Spain, Serbia, Greece, Slovenia, France, and Croatia qualified for the 2010 FIBA World Championship. Turkey previously qualified as hosts of the competition. Russia, Germany, and Lithuania were later awarded wild card berths to the tournament.

== All-Tournament Team ==
The following players were named to the All-Tournament Team:

(Greece) Vassilis Spanoulis
(Serbia) Miloš Teodosić
(Spain) Rudy Fernandez
(Slovenia) Erazem Lorbek
(Spain) Pau Gasol (MVP)

== Statistics ==
Note: Only players who participated in at least five games are eligible for statistic charts.

=== Individual tournament highs ===
Points

Pos.	Name	G	Pts	PPG
1	(Spain) Pau Gasol	9	168	18.7
2	(France) Tony Parker	8	142	17.8
3	(Slovenia) Erazem Lorbek	9	148	16.4
4	(Turkey) Ersan İlyasova	7	113	16.1
5	(Poland) David Logan	6	93	15.5
6	(Poland) Marcin Gortat	6	86	14.3
7	(Greece) Vassilis Spanoulis	9	127	14.1
7	(Serbia) Miloš Teodosić	9	127	14.1
9	(Slovenia) Jaka Lakovič	9	126	14.0
10	(Croatia) Roko Ukić	8	109	13.6
10	(Spain) Rudy Fernández	8	109	13.6

Rebounds

Pos.	Name	G	Reb.	RPG
1	(Poland) Marcin Gortat	6	65	10.8
2	(Spain) Pau Gasol	9	75	8.3
3	(Slovenia) Erazem Lorbek	9	67	7.4
4	(Turkey) Ersan İlyasova	7	51	7.3
5	(Greece) Ioannis Bourousis	8	58	7.3
6	(North Macedonia) Pero Antić	6	40	6.7
7	(Turkey) Ömer Aşık	9	57	6.3
8	(Germany) Jan-Hendrik Jagla	6	38	6.3
9	(Greece) Antonis Fotsis	9	55	6.1
10	(Poland) Maciej Lampe	6	36	6.0

Assists

Pos.	Name	G	Ass.	APG
1	(Serbia) Miloš Teodosić	9	47	5.2
2	(Russia) Anton Ponkrashov	9	44	4.9
3	(Poland) David Logan	6	27	4.5
4	(France) Tony Parker	8	35	4.4
5	(Poland) Łukasz Koszarek	6	26	4.3
6	(Greece) Vassilis Spanoulis	9	38	4.2
7	(Spain) Ricky Rubio	9	35	3.9
8	(Germany) Steffen Hamann	6	23	3.8
8	(Germany) Heiko Schaffartzik	6	23	3.8
10	(Slovenia) Jaka Lakovič	9	34	3.8

Steals

Pos.	Name	G	Stls	SPG
1	(Spain) Rudy Fernandez	8	17	2.1
2	(France) Tony Parker	8	14	1.8
3	(Lithuania) Kšyštof Lavrinovič	6	10	1.7
4	(Greece) Nick Calathes	8	13	1.6
4	(Russia) Kelly McCarty	8	13	1.6
6	(Russia) Sergey Monya	9	14	1.6
7	(Croatia) Roko Ukić	8	12	1.5
8	(North Macedonia) Vrbica Stefanov	6	9	1.5
9	(Slovenia) Erazem Lorbek	9	13	1.4
9	(Greece) Vassilis Spanoulis	9	13	1.4
9	(Serbia) Novica Veličković	9	13	1.4
9	(Spain) Ricky Rubio	9	13	1.4

Blocks

Pos.	Name	G	Blocks	BPG
1	(Spain) Pau Gasol	9	20	2.2
2	(Poland) Marcin Gortat	6	12	2.0
3	(Russia) Timofey Mozgov	9	12	1.3
3	(Spain) Marc Gasol	9	12	1.3
5	(Turkey) Ersan İlyasova	7	9	1.3
6	(Poland) Maciej Lampe	6	7	1.2
7	(France) Ronny Turiaf	9	10	1.1
8	(France) Nicolas Batum	9	9	1.0
8	(Russia) Sergey Monya	9	9	1.0
8	(Germany) Patrick Femerling	6	6	1.0

Minutes

Pos.	Name	G	Min.	MPG
1	(Slovenia) Jaka Lakovič	9	335	37.2
2	(Poland) Marcin Gortat	6	207	34.5
2	(Poland) David Logan	6	207	34.5
4	(Russia) Kelly McCarty	8	268	33.5
5	(Greece) Vassilis Spanoulis	9	282	33.1
6	(Slovenia) Erazem Lorbek	9	279	31.0
7	(France) Tony Parker	8	247	30.9
8	(North Macedonia) Vrbica Stefanov	6	183	30.5
9	(Turkey) Ersan İlyasova	7	209	29.9
10	(France) Boris Diaw	8	236	29.5

=== Individual game highs ===
Department	Name	Total	Opponent
Points	(Serbia) Miloš Teodosić	32	Slovenia (9/19)
Rebounds	(Latvia) Andris Biedriņš	20	France (9/8)
Assists	(Serbia) Miloš Teodosić	12	Lithuania (9/16)
Steals	(Slovenia) Goran Dragić (Spain) Rudy Fernández	6	Spain (9/9); France (9/17)
Blocks	(Russia) Timofey Mozgov (Poland) Marcin Gortat	6	France (9/9); Bulgaria (9/7)
Field goal percentage	(Germany) Heiko Schaffartzik (Slovenia) Erazem Lorbek	100% (8/8)	Greece (9/11); Great Britain (9/7)
3-point field goal percentage	(Germany) Heiko Schaffartzik	100% (5/5)	Greece (9/11); Croatia (9/15)
Free throw percentage	(Slovenia) Erazem Lorbek	100% (10/10)	Serbia (9/19)
Turnovers	(Poland) David Logan	8	Lithuania (9/8)

=== Team tournament highs ===
Offensive PPG

Pos.	Name	PPG
1	Spain	79.8
2	Greece	75.9
3	Serbia	75.6
4	Slovenia	75.2
5	Turkey	74.7

Defensive PPG

Pos.	Name	PPG
1	France	66.8
2	Russia	68.4
3	Spain	68.9
4	Slovenia	69.0
5	Greece	69.9

Rebounds

Pos.	Name	RPG
1	Greece	37.2
2	Poland	37.0
3	Spain	36.4
4	Lithuania	34.8
5	France	34.3

Assists

Pos.	Name	APG
1	Spain	17.3
2	Poland	17.2
3	Serbia	16.1
4	France	15.8
5	Lithuania	15.3

Steals

Pos.	Name	SPG
1	Spain	8.1
2	Greece	7.7
3	Serbia	7.6
4	France	7.4
5	Turkey	7.3

Blocks

Pos.	Name	BPG
1	Spain	4.4
2	Poland	3.8
3	France	3.4
4	Russia	3.3
5	Turkey	2.7

=== Team game highs ===
Department	Team	Total	Opponent
Points	Greece	106	Israel (9/9)
Rebounds	Greece	47	Spain (9/19); Turkey (9/18)
Assists	Poland; Spain; Spain	25	Bulgaria (9/7); Poland (9/16); Lithuania (9/14)
Steals	North Macedonia	14	Germany (9/13)
Blocks	Poland	10	Bulgaria (9/7)
Field goal percentage	Greece	61.7% (37/60)	Israel (9/9)
3-point field goal percentage	Russia	66.7% (16/24)	Turkey (9/20)
Free throw percentage	Lithuania	91.7% (22/24)	Bulgaria
Turnovers	4 tied with 20		

== Team rosters (Final Four) ==
- 1. Spain: Pau Gasol, Juan Carlos Navarro, Víctor Claver, Rudy Fernández, Jorge Garbajosa, Sergio Llull, Carlos Cabezas, Ricky Rubio, Felipe Reyes, Marc Gasol, Raúl López, Álex Mumbrú (Coach: (Italy) Sergio Scariolo)
- 2. Serbia: Miloš Teodosić, Stefan Marković, Bojan Popović, Uroš Tripković, Ivan Paunić, Milenko Tepić, Nemanja Bjelica, Novica Veličković, Milan Mačvan, Nenad Krstić, Kosta Perović, Miroslav Raduljica (Coach: Dušan Ivković)
- 3. Greece: Nick Calathes, Giannis Kalampokis, Vassilis Spanoulis, Stratos Perperoglou, Nikos Zisis, Georgios Printezis, Kostas Kaimakoglou, Antonis Fotsis, Kosta Koufos, Ioannis Bourousis, Sofoklis Schortsanitis, Andreas Glyniadakis (Coach: (Lithuania) Jonas Kazlauskas)
- 4. Slovenia: Jaka Lakovič, Goran Dragić, Domen Lorbek, Samo Udrih, Jaka Klobučar, Boštjan Nachbar, Goran Jagodnik, Uroš Slokar, Jurica Golemac, Matjaž Smodiš, Erazem Lorbek, Primož Brezec (Coach: Jure Zdovc)

== FIBA broadcasting rights ==
Country	Broadcaster
ALB	Top Channel
BEL	Be TV
BIH	BHRT
BRA	TV Esporte Interativo
BUL	BNT
CRO	HRT
CZE	Czech Television
CZE	Sport 1
CYP	Lumiere TV
DEN	Viasat Sport
ESP	La Sexta
ESP	Gol Televisión
EST	ETV
FIN	Viasat Sport
FRA	Canal+
FRA	Sport+
GER	DSF

Country	Broadcaster
GBR	ESPN
GBR	BBC
GRE	ERT
HUN	Sport 1
IND	TEN Sports
ITA	Rai Sport Più
ISR	Channel 1
ISR	Sport 5
JPN	J Sports
LAT	TV3
LAT	TV6
LIT	TV3
LIT	TV6
MKD	Sitel
MNE	RTCG
NOR	Viasat Sport

Country	Broadcaster
PHI	C/S9
PHI	Basketball TV
POL	TVP
QAT	Al Jazeera Sports
ROC	Videoland
ROU	Sport 1
RUS	NTV Plus
SRB	RTS
SVK	STV
SVK	Sport 1
SLO	RTVSLO
SLO	Šport TV
SWE	Viasat Sport
TUR	NTV
TUR	NTV Spor
USA	ESPN360

== See also ==
- Eurobasket 2009 Division B
- EuroBasket Women 2009
