= Basketball at the 2008 Summer Olympics – Men's tournament =

Tournament details
- Host country: China
- City: Beijing
- Dates: 10 – 24 August 2008
- Teams: 12 (from 5 confederations)
- Venue: Beijing Olympic Basketball Gymnasium

Final positions
- Champions: United States (13th title)
- Runners-up: Spain
- Third place: Argentina
- Fourth place: Lithuania

Tournament statistics
- Games played: 38
- Top scorer: (Spain) Pau Gasol (19.6 points per game)

The men's basketball tournament at the 2008 Summer Olympics in Beijing, began on 10 August and ended on 24 August, when the United States defeated Spain 118–107 for the gold medal. All games were held at the Beijing Olympic Basketball Gymnasium.The United States, nicknamed the "Redeem Team", defeated Spain in the gold medal game, finishing the tournament undefeated and winning the gold medal for the first time since 2000, while Argentina, the defending Olympic champions who lost to the U.S. in the semifinals, won the bronze medal.

== Qualification ==
Country	Qualified as	Date of qualification	Previous appearances	FIBA World Ranking
China	Olympics host	July 13, 2001	6 (1984, 1988, 1992, 1996, 2000, 2004)	11
Spain	World champion	September 3, 2006	10 (1960, 1964, 1968, 1972, 1980, 1984, 1988, 1992, 2000, 2004)	3
Iran	Asian champion	August 5, 2007	1 (1948)	45
Australia	Oceanian champion	August 22, 2007	11 (1956, 1964, 1972, 1976, 1980, 1984, 1988, 1992, 1996, 2000, 2004)	9
Angola	African champion	August 25, 2007	4 (1992, 1996, 2000, 2004)	14
Argentina	Americas runner-up	September 1, 2007	4 (1948, 1952, 1996, 2004)	1
United States	Americas champion	September 1, 2007	15 (1936, 1948, 1952, 1956, 1960, 1964, 1968, 1972, 1976, 1984, 1988, 1992, 1996, 2000, 2004)	2
Russia	European champion	September 15, 2007	13 (1952, 1956, 1960, 1964, 1968, 1972, 1976, 1980, 1988, 1992, 1996, 2000)	14
Lithuania	European third place	September 16, 2007	4 (1992, 1996, 2000, 2004)	5
Croatia	Wildcard qualifier	July 19, 2008	2 (1992, 1996)	20
Greece	Wildcard qualifier	July 19, 2008	3 (1952, 1996, 2004)	6
Germany	Wildcard qualifier	July 20, 2008	4 (1936, 1972, 1984, 1992)	9

== Format ==
- Twelve teams are split into 2 preliminary round groups of 6 teams each. The top 4 teams from each group qualify for the knockout stage.
- Fifth-placed teams from each group are ranked 9th–10th by basis of their records.
- Sixth-placed teams from each group are ranked 11th–12th by basis of their records.
- In the quarterfinals, the matchups are as follows: A1 vs. B4, A2 vs. B3, A3 vs. B2 and A4 vs. B1.
  - The eliminated teams at the quarterfinals are ranked 5th–8th by basis of their preliminary round records
- The winning teams from the quarterfinals meet in the semifinals as follows: A1/B4 vs. A3/B2 and A2/B3 vs. A4/B1.
- The winning teams from the semifinals play for the gold medal. The losing teams play for the bronze.

Ties are broken via the following the criteria, with the first option used first, all the way down to the last option:

1. Head to head results
2. Goal average (not the goal difference) between the tied teams
3. Goal average of the tied teams for all teams in its group

All times are local Beijing Time (UTC+8).

== Preliminary round ==
All times are China Standard Time (UTC+8)

=== Group A ===
Pos	Team	Pld	W	L	PF	PA	PD	Pts	Qualification
1	Lithuania	5	4	1	425	400	+25	9 (Note: Head-to-head record: Lithuania 1–0 Argentina)	Quarterfinals
2	Argentina	5	4	1	425	361	+64	9	Quarterfinals
3	Croatia	5	3	2	399	380	+19	8 (Note: Head-to-head record: Croatia 1–0 Australia)	Quarterfinals
4	Australia	5	3	2	457	405	+52	8	Quarterfinals
5	Russia	5	1	4	387	406	−19	6	
6	Iran	5	0	5	323	464	−141	5	

Source: FIBA archive
Rules for classification: 1) points; 2) head-to-head points; 3) head-to-head goal average; 4) head-to-head number of points scored.
Notes:

10 August 2008
09:00

Report

Russia	71–49	Iran
Scoring by quarter: 24–5, 14–17, 8–16, 25–11
Pts: Holden 19; Rebs: Monia 6 Asts: Savrasenko 4		Pts: Nikkhah 16; Rebs: Haddadi 8 Asts: Kamrani 3

Wukesong Indoor Stadium, Beijing
Attendance: 11,083
Referees: Nikolaos Pitsilkas (GRE)

10 August 2008
16:45

Report

Lithuania	79–75	Argentina
Scoring by quarter: 14–11, 20–19, 17–15, 28–30
Pts: Kleiza 13; Rebs: K. Lavrinovič 7 Asts: Jasikevičius 8		Pts: Ginobili 19; Rebs: Oberto 11; Asts: Oberto, Prigioni 3

Wukesong Indoor Stadium, Beijing
Attendance: 11,083
Referees: Nikolaos Zavlanos (GRE)

10 August 2008
20:00

Report

Australia	82–97	Croatia
Scoring by quarter: 14–21, 17–26, 22–26, 29–24
Pts: Nielsen 13; Rebs: Anstey 7 Asts: Barlow 3		Pts: Prkačin, Banić 16; Rebs: Lončar 10; Asts: Popović 5

Wukesong Indoor Stadium, Beijing
Attendance: 11,083
Referees: Eddie Rush (USA)

12 August 2008
09:00

Report

Iran	67–99	Lithuania
Scoring by quarter: 20–15, 14–31, 19–28, 14–25
Pts: Haddadi 21; Rebs: Sahakian 12; Asts: Amini 4		Pts: Kleiza 22; Rebs: Kleiza 8 Asts: Jasikevičius, Lukauskis, Mačiulis 3

Wukesong Indoor Stadium, Beijing
Attendance: 11,083
Referees: Eddie Rush (USA)

12 August 2008
11:15

Report

Croatia	85–78	Russia
Scoring by quarter: 16–17, 26–19, 18–15, 25–27
Pts: Popović 22; Rebs: Barać 7 Asts: Popović, Lončar 3		Pts: Kirilenko 18; Rebs: Kirilenko 6 Asts: Kirilenko, Bikov 3

Wukesong Indoor Stadium, Beijing
Attendance: 11,083
Referees: Nikolaos Zavlanos (GRE)

12 August 2008
22:15

Report

Argentina	85–68	Australia
Scoring by quarter: 23–11, 16–18, 24–17, 22–22
Pts: Ginobili 21; Rebs: Nocioni 8 Asts: Ginobili 7		Pts: Mills 22; Rebs: Andersen 6 Asts: Bogut, Bruton 2

Wukesong Indoor Stadium, Beijing
Attendance: 11,083
Referees: Nikolaos Pitsilkas (GRE)

14 August 2008
11:15

Report

Australia	106–68	Iran
Scoring by quarter: 28–15, 25–14, 22–19, 31–20
Pts: Newley 24; Rebs: Bogut 7 Asts: Mills, Worthington, Bruton 5		Pts: Nikkhah 23; Rebs: Haddadi 8 Asts: Davari 4

Wukesong Indoor Stadium, Beijing
Attendance: 11,083
Referees: Nikolaos Zavlanos (GRE)

14 August 2008
16:45

Report

Lithuania	86–79	Russia
Scoring by quarter: 23–24, 21–17, 25–21, 17–17
Pts: Kaukėnas 20; Rebs: Kleiza 11; Asts: Jasikevičius 5		Pts: Holden 25; Rebs: Khriapa 9 Asts: Kirilenko 6

Wukesong Indoor Stadium, Beijing
Attendance: 11,083
Referees: Nikolaos Pitsilkas (GRE)

14 August 2008
22:15

Report

Argentina	77–53	Croatia
Scoring by quarter: 21–13, 19–9, 19–16, 18–15
Pts: Nocioni 18; Rebs: Nocioni 8 Asts: Ginobili 8		Pts: Tomas, Banić 9 Rebs: Banić 6 Asts: Ukić 2

Wukesong Indoor Stadium, Beijing
Attendance: 11,083
Referees: Juan Carlos Arteaga (ESP)

16 August 2008
11:15

Report

Russia	80–95	Australia
Scoring by quarter: 16–27, 17–22, 22–20, 25–26
Pts: Khriapa 21; Rebs: Khriapa 9 Asts: Holden 6		Pts: Bogut, Bruton 22; Rebs: Bogut 8 Asts: Bruton 6

Wukesong Indoor Stadium, Beijing
Attendance: 11,083
Referees: Carl Jungebrand (FIN)

16 August 2008
14:30

Report

Croatia	73–86	Lithuania
Scoring by quarter: 15–13, 30–29, 17–16, 11–28
Pts: Ukić 13; Rebs: Banić 7 Asts: Kus 3		Pts: Lukauskis 20; Rebs: K. Lavrinovič 7 Asts: Jasikevičius 6

Wukesong Indoor Stadium, Beijing
Attendance: 11,083
Referees: Nikolaos Zavlanos (GRE)

16 August 2008
16:45

Report

Iran	82–97	Argentina
Scoring by quarter: 14–19, 19–23, 24–30, 25–25
Pts: Haddadi 21; Rebs: Haddadi 16; Asts: Kamrani 4		Pts: Ginobili 32; Rebs: Scola 7 Asts: Prigioni 6

Wukesong Indoor Stadium, Beijing
Attendance: 11,083
Referees: Nikolaos Pitsilkas (GRE)

18 August 2008
09:00

Report

Iran	57–91	Croatia
Scoring by quarter: 8–19, 8–35, 23–16, 18–21
Pts: Nikkhah 25; Rebs: Haddadi 15; Asts: Haddadi 2		Pts: Rozić, Tomas 16; Rebs: Lončar, Barać 7 Asts: Ukić 8

Wukesong Indoor Stadium, Beijing
Attendance: 11,083
Referees: Carl Jungebrand (FIN)

18 August 2008
11:15

Report

Australia	106–75	Lithuania
Scoring by quarter: 28–14, 27–15, 20–22, 31–24
Pts: Bogut 23; Rebs: Mills 4 Asts: Anstey 4		Pts: K. Lavrinovič 14; Rebs: K. Lavrinovič 8 Asts: Jasikevičius 5

Wukesong Indoor Stadium, Beijing
Attendance: 11,083
Referees: Nikolaos Pitsilkas (GRE)

18 August 2008
22:15

Report

Argentina	91–79	Russia
Scoring by quarter: 27–16, 18–23, 27–25, 19–15
Pts: Scola 37; Rebs: Nocioni 9 Asts: Prigioni 10		Pts: Kirilenko 23; Rebs: Kirilenko 9 Asts: Holden 5

Wukesong Indoor Stadium, Beijing
Attendance: 11,083
Referees: Nikolaos Zavlanos (GRE)

=== Group B ===
Pos	Team	Pld	W	L	PF	PA	PD	Pts	Qualification
1	United States	5	5	0	515	354	+161	10	Quarterfinals
2	Spain	5	4	1	418	369	+49	9	Quarterfinals
3	Greece	5	3	2	415	375	+40	8	Quarterfinals
4	China (H)	5	2	3	366	400	−34	7	Quarterfinals
5	Germany	5	1	4	330	390	−60	6	
6	Angola	5	0	5	321	477	−156	5	

Source: FIBA archive
Rules for classification: 1) points; 2) head-to-head points; 3) head-to-head goal average; 4) head-to-head number of points scored.
(H) Hosts

10 August 2008
11:15

Report

Germany	95–66	Angola
Scoring by quarter: 25–21, 29–13, 24–18, 17–14
Pts: Kaman 24; Rebs: Jagla 11; Asts: Hamann 4		Pts: Mingas 24; Rebs: Gomes 8 Asts: Cipriano 2

Wukesong Indoor Stadium, Beijing
Attendance: 11,083
Referees: Romualdas Brazauskas (LTU)

10 August 2008
14:30

Report

Spain	81–66	Greece
Scoring by quarter: 20–16, 15–13, 27–17, 19–20
Pts: Fernández 16; Rebs: P. Gasol 7 Asts: Navarro, Rodríguez 2		Pts: Spanoulis 15; Rebs: Tsartsaris 8 Asts: Diamantidis 3

Wukesong Indoor Stadium, Beijing
Attendance: 11,083
Referees: Reynaldo Mercedes (DOM)

10 August 2008
22:15

Report

United States	101–70	China
Scoring by quarter: 20–16, 29–21, 25–11, 27–22
Pts: Wade 19; Rebs: Bosh 8 Asts: Paul 6		Pts: Yao 13; Rebs: Yao 10; Asts: Chen, Liu, Zhu, Sun 2

Wukesong Indoor Stadium, Beijing
Attendance: 11,083
Referees: Carl Jungebrand (FIN)

12 August 2008
14:30

Report

Greece	87–64	Germany
Scoring by quarter: 21–23, 23–10, 25–15, 18–16
Pts: Spanoulis 23; Rebs: Bourousis 8 Asts: Spanoulis 5		Pts: Nowitzki 13; Rebs: Nowitzki 6 Asts: Greene 2

Wukesong Indoor Stadium, Beijing
Attendance: 11,083
Referees: Carl Jungebrand (FIN)

12 August 2008
16:45

Report

China	75–85 (OT)	Spain
Scoring by quarter: 18–20, 28–17, 15–10, 11–25, Overtime: 3–13
Pts: Liu 19; Rebs: Yao, Yi 9 Asts: Yao, Sun 3		Pts: P. Gasol 29; Rebs: P. Gasol, Fernández 8 Asts: Fernández 6

Wukesong Indoor Stadium, Beijing
Attendance: 11,083
Referees: José Carrión (PUR)

12 August 2008
20:00

Report

Angola	76–97	United States
Scoring by quarter: 18–29, 19–26, 16–26, 23–16
Pts: Morais 24; Rebs: Gomes 8 Asts: Costa, Ambrosio 2		Pts: Wade 19; Rebs: Anthony 6 Asts: James 5

Wukesong Indoor Stadium, Beijing
Attendance: 11,083
Referees: Pablo Estévez (ARG)

14 August 2008
09:00

Report

Germany	59–72	Spain
Scoring by quarter: 15–12, 21–27, 12–20, 11–13
Pts: Hamann 15; Rebs: Kaman 10; Asts: Hamann 3		Pts: Calderón 15; Rebs: M. Gasol 8 Asts: P. Gasol, Rubio 3

Wukesong Indoor Stadium, Beijing
Attendance: 11,083
Referees: Fabio Facchini (ITA)

14 August 2008
14:30

Report

Angola	68–85	China
Scoring by quarter: 15–28, 27–16, 9–21, 17–20
Pts: Gomes 17; Rebs: Mingas 5 Asts: Gomes 3		Pts: Yao 30; Rebs: Yi 11; Asts: Zhu, Li 3

Wukesong Indoor Stadium, Beijing
Attendance: 11,083
Referees: Carl Jungebrand (FIN)

14 August 2008
20:00

Report

United States	92–69	Greece
Scoring by quarter: 20–16, 31–16, 23–22, 18–15
Pts: Bryant, Bosh 18; Rebs: James, Howard, Anthony 6 Asts: James 6		Pts: Papaloukas 15; Rebs: Fotsis, Papaloukas 8 Asts: Diamantidis 3

Wukesong Indoor Stadium, Beijing
Attendance: 11,083
Referees: Romualdas Brazauskas (LTU)

16 August 2008
09:00

Report

Greece	102–61	Angola
Scoring by quarter: 12–11, 31–17, 38–14, 21–19
Pts: Bourousis 22; Rebs: Glyniadakis, Fotsis 7 Asts: Fotsis 5		Pts: Mingas 25; Rebs: Geronimo 7 Asts: Costa 4

Wukesong Indoor Stadium, Beijing
Attendance: 11,083
Referees: José Carrión (PUR)

16 August 2008
20:00

Report

China	59–55	Germany
Scoring by quarter: 19–9, 8–22, 20–8, 12–16
Pts: Yao 25; Rebs: Yao, Yi 11; Asts: Liu 3		Pts: Nowitzki 24; Rebs: Nowitzki 17; Asts: Hamann, Garrett 2

Wukesong Indoor Stadium, Beijing
Attendance: 11,083
Referees: Eddie Rush (USA)

16 August 2008
22:15

Report

Spain	82–119	United States
Scoring by quarter: 22–31, 23–30, 18–25, 19–33
Pts: Reyes 19; Rebs: Reyes 8 Asts: Fernández, Rubio 3		Pts: James 18; Rebs: Bosh 7 Asts: James, Paul 8

Wukesong Indoor Stadium, Beijing
Attendance: 11,083
Referees: Romualdas Brazauskas (LTU)

18 August 2008
14:30

Report

Greece	91–77	China
Scoring by quarter: 27–15, 19–9, 23–30, 22–23
Pts: Bourousis, Spanoulis 19; Rebs: Bourousis 19; Asts: Papaloukas, Spanoulis 5		Pts: Yao 16; Rebs: Wang 8 Asts: Sun 6

Wukesong Indoor Stadium, Beijing
Attendance: 11,083
Referees: Cristiano Maranho (BRA)

18 August 2008
16:45

Report

Angola	50–98	Spain
Scoring by quarter: 23–15, 7–25, 11–31, 9–27
Pts: Mingas 10; Rebs: Mingas, Ambrosio 5 Asts: Costa 5		Pts: P. Gasol 31; Rebs: P. Gasol 9 Asts: Rodríguez, Rubio 5

Wukesong Indoor Stadium, Beijing
Attendance: 11,083
Referees: Eddie Rush (USA)

18 August 2008
20:00

Report

United States	106–57	Germany
Scoring by quarter: 31–12, 22–17, 30–17, 23–11
Pts: Howard 22; Rebs: Howard 10; Asts: Williams 5		Pts: Nowitzki 14; Rebs: Nowitzki 8 Asts: Hamann, Jagla 2

Wukesong Indoor Stadium, Beijing
Attendance: 11,083
Referees: Juan Carlos Arteaga (ESP)

== Knockout round ==
Quarterfinals
A1	Lithuania	94
B4	China	68
B2	Spain	72
A3	Croatia	59
B1	United States	116
A4	Australia	85
A2	Argentina	80
B3	Greece	78

Semifinals
A1	Lithuania	86
B2	Spain	91
B1	United States	101
A2	Argentina	81

Final
B2	Spain	107
B1	United States	118
Bronze medal game
A1	Lithuania	75
A2	Argentina	87

=== Quarterfinals ===
20 August 2008
14:30

Report

Spain	72–59	Croatia
Scoring by quarter: 22–11, 15–15, 14–12, 21–21
Scoring by half: 37–26, 35–33
Pts: P. Gasol 20; Rebs: P. Gasol 10; Asts: Calderón, P. Gasol 2		Pts: Banić 15; Rebs: Banić, Planinić 5 Asts: Kus, Nicević 2

Wukesong Indoor Stadium, Beijing
Attendance: 11,083
Referees: Nikolaos Zavlanos (GRE)

20 August 2008
16:45

Report

Lithuania	94–68	China
Scoring by quarter: 19–17, 22–13, 29–23, 24–15
Scoring by half: 41–30, 53–38
Pts: Jasikevičius 23; Rebs: Kleiza 7 Asts: Jasikevičius 6		Pts: Yao 19; Rebs: Yi 9 Asts: Yao 3

Wukesong Indoor Stadium, Beijing
Attendance: 11,083
Referees: Nikolaos Pitsilkas (GRE)

20 August 2008
20:00

Report

United States	116–85	Australia
Scoring by quarter: 25–24, 30–19, 34–18, 27–24
Scoring by half: 55–43, 61–42
Pts: Bryant 25; Rebs: James 9 Asts: James, Paul, Wade, Williams 3		Pts: Mills 20; Rebs: Worthington 6 Asts: Newley 3

Wukesong Indoor Stadium, Beijing
Attendance: 11,083
Referees: Juan Carlos Arteaga (ESP)

20 August 2008
22:15

Report

Argentina	80–78	Greece
Scoring by quarter: 22–23, 17–17, 17–15, 24–23
Scoring by half: 39–40, 41–38
Pts: Ginobili 24; Rebs: Scola 8 Asts: Prigioni 3		Pts: Fotsis 17; Rebs: Fotsis 10; Asts: Papaloukas 4

Wukesong Indoor Stadium, Beijing
Attendance: 11,083
Referees: Romualdas Brazauskas (LTU)

=== Semifinals ===
22 August 2008
20:00

Report

Spain	91–86	Lithuania
Scoring by quarter: 21–19, 19–23, 22–24, 29–20
Scoring by half: 40–42, 51–44
Pts: P Gasol 19; Rebs: Jiménez 7 Asts: Rubio 4		Pts: Jasaitis, Jasikevičius 19; Rebs: Jasaitis 8 Asts: Jasikevičius 6

Wukesong Indoor Stadium, Beijing
Attendance: 11,083
Referees: Nikolaos Pitsilkas (GRE)

22 August 2008
22:00

Report

Argentina	81–101	United States
Scoring by quarter: 11–30, 29–19, 24–29, 17–23
Scoring by half: 40–49, 41–52
Pts: Scola 28; Rebs: Scola 11; Asts: Prigioni 3		Pts: Anthony 21; Rebs: Bosh 10; Asts: Kidd 7

Wukesong Indoor Stadium, Beijing
Attendance: 11,083
Referees: Luigi Lamonica (ITA)

=== Bronze medal match ===
24 August 2008
12:00

Report

Lithuania	75–87	Argentina (bronze)
Scoring by quarter: 21–24, 13–22, 15–22, 26–19
Scoring by half: 34–46, 41–41
Pts: Šiškauskas 15; Rebs: Šiškauskas, K. Lavrinovič 6 Asts: Jasikevičius 3		Pts: Delfino 20; Rebs: Delfino 10; Asts: Prigioni 7

Wukesong Indoor Stadium, Beijing
Attendance: 11,083
Referees: Eddie Rush (USA)

=== Gold medal match ===
24 August 2008
14:00

Report

(silver) Spain	107–118	United States (gold)
Scoring by quarter: 31–38, 30–31, 21–22, 25–27
Scoring by half: 61–69, 46–49
Pts: Fernández 22; Rebs: Reyes 7 Asts: Navarro 4		Pts: Wade 27; Rebs: Bosh 7 Asts: Bryant 6

Wukesong Indoor Stadium, Beijing
Attendance: 11,083
Referees: Romualdas Brazauskas (LTU), Pablo Estévez (ARG), Carl Jungebrand (FIN)

Team details

Spain	United States

F	4	Pau Gasol
PG	6	Ricky Rubio
G	7	Juan C. Navarro
F	9	Felipe Reyes
SF	10	Carlos Jiménez (c)
G	5	Rudy Fernández
PG	11	Raül López
SG	12	Berni Rodríguez
C	13	Marc Gasol
SF	14	Álex Mumbrú
PF	15	Jorge Garbajosa
Head Coach:
(Spain) Aíto García Reneses

G	5	Jason Kidd
F	6	LeBron James
G	10	Kobe Bryant (c)
C	11	Dwight Howard
F	15	Carmelo Anthony
F	4	Carlos Boozer
G	7	Deron Williams
G	8	Michael Redd
G	9	Dwyane Wade
F	12	Chris Bosh
G	13	Chris Paul
F	14	Tayshaun Prince
Head Coach:
(United States) Mike Krzyzewski

The Americans got off to a slow start with the Spaniards hitting seven of their first nine shots; if not for a 10–0 run by LeBron James and Dwyane Wade, the Americans would have trailed in the first quarter. With the USA leading by 14, Spain chipped away at the lead during the second quarter to cut the deficit to eight points.

The teams traded baskets in the third quarter, with Spain cutting the deficit further to seven. A three-point field goal by Rudy Fernández cut the lead into two, the smallest deficit with 8:13 left in the fourth. Kobe Bryant and Wade extended the lead with three-pointers to 103–92 but Spain had a final push, capped with another three-pointer from Carlos Jiménez to reduce the lead to 108–104. In the final two minutes a three-pointer by Dwyane Wade and a Kobe Bryant field goal extended the lead back to 9. It is widely regarded as one of the greatest basketball games ever played.

== Awards ==
2008 Olympic Basketball Champions

United States
Thirteenth title

== Statistical leaders ==
Top ten in points, rebounds and assists, and top 5 in steals and blocks.

=== Points ===
Name	PPG
(Spain) Pau Gasol	20.0
(China) Yao Ming	19.0
(Argentina) Luis Scola	18.9
(Argentina) Manu Ginóbili	17.7
(Russia) JR Holden	17.6
(Iran) Samad Nikkhah Bahrami	17.2
(Germany) Dirk Nowitzki	17.0
(Iran) Hamed Haddadi	16.6
(United States) Dwyane Wade	16.1
(Russia) Andrei Kirilenko	15.8

=== Rebounds ===
Name	RPG
(Iran) Hamed Haddadi	11.2
(Germany) Dirk Nowitzki	8.4
(China) Yao Ming	8.2
(China) Yi Jianlian	7.5
(Spain) Pau Gasol	7.0
(Greece) Antonis Fotsis	6.7
(Argentina) Luis Scola	6.6
(Russia) Viktor Khriapa	6.5
(Russia) Andrei Kirilenko	6.4
(Argentina) Andrés Nocioni	6.3

=== Assists ===
Name	APG
(Lithuania) Šarūnas Jasikevičius	5.3
(Russia) Jon Robert Holden	4.8
(Argentina) Pablo Prigioni	4.6
(United States) Chris Paul	4.1
(Argentina) Manu Ginóbili	3.9
(United States) LeBron James	3.8
(Russia) Andrei Kirilenko	3.4
(Spain) Ricky Rubio	3.2
(Australia) C.J. Bruton	3.0
(Greece) Vasileios Spanoulis	3.0

=== Steals ===
Name	SPG
(Argentina) Pablo Prigioni	2.6
(Russia) Andrei Kirilenko	2.6
(United States) LeBron James	2.4
(United States) Chris Paul	2.3
(United States) Dwyane Wade	2.3

=== Blocks ===
Name	BPG
(Iran) Hamed Haddadi	2.6
(Russia) Andrei Kirilenko	2.2
(Lithuania) Kšyštof Lavrinovič	1.5
(China) Yao Ming	1.5
(Spain) Pau Gasol	1.1

=== Game highs ===
Department	Name	Total	Opponent
Points	(Argentina) Luis Scola	37	Russia
Rebounds	(Germany) Dirk Nowitzki	17	China
Assists	(Argentina) Pablo Prigioni	10	Russia
Steals	(Russia) Andrei Kirilenko (United States) Dwyane Wade	6	Lithuania; Greece
Blocks	(Iran) Hamed Haddadi (Lithuania) Kšyštof Lavrinovič (China) Yao Ming	4	Lithuania; Argentina; Angola
Field goal percentage	(Greece) Ioannis Bouroussis	100% (9/9)	Angola
3-point field goal percentage	(Russia) Viktor Khriapa (Germany) Dirk Nowitzki	100% (6/6)	Australia; Angola
Free throw percentage	(United States) Carmelo Anthony	100% (13/13)	Argentina
Turnovers	(Angola) Carlos Morais	10	United States

== Final standings ==
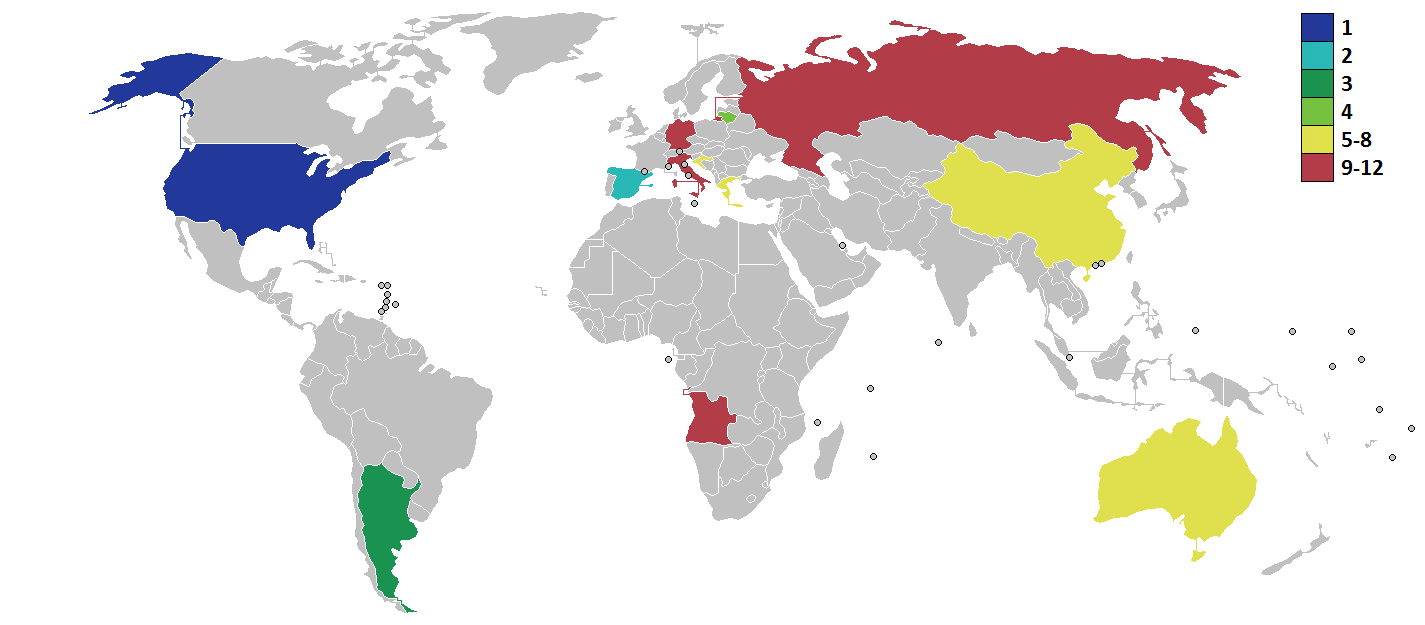
Competing teams.

Rankings are determined by:

- 1st–4th
  - Results of gold and bronze medal games.
- 5th–8th:
  - Win–loss record in the preliminary round group
  - Standings in the preliminary round group (i.e. Group A's #3 is ranked higher than Group B's #4.)
  - Goal average in the preliminary round group
- 9th–10th and 11th–12th:
  - 5th placers in the preliminary round groups are classified 9th–10th; 6th placers classified *11th–12th
  - Win–loss record in the preliminary round group
  - Goal average in the preliminary round group

Rank	Team	Pld	W	L	PF	PA	PD	Standing	GAvg	New rank
1st place, gold medalist(s)	United States	8	8	0	850	627	+223			2
2nd place, silver medalist(s)	Spain	8	6	2	688	632	+56			3
3rd place, bronze medalist(s)	Argentina	8	6	2	673	615	+58			1
4th	Lithuania	8	5	3	680	646	+34			6
Eliminated at the quarterfinals
5th	Greece	6	3	3	493	455	+38	B-3rd	1.117	4
6th	Croatia	6	3	3	458	452	+6	A-3rd	1.050	18
7th	Australia	6	3	3	542	521	+21	A-4th		9
8th	China	6	2	4	434	494	−60			10
Preliminary round 5th placers
9th	Russia	5	1	4	387	406	−19	–	0.953	15
10th	Germany	5	1	4	330	390	−60	–	0.846	7
Preliminary round 6th placers
11th	Iran	5	0	5	323	464	−141	–	0.696	23
12th	Angola	5	0	5	321	477	−156	–	0.673	12

== See also ==
- Women's Tournament
