= EuroBasket 2009 final =

EuroBasket 2009 Final
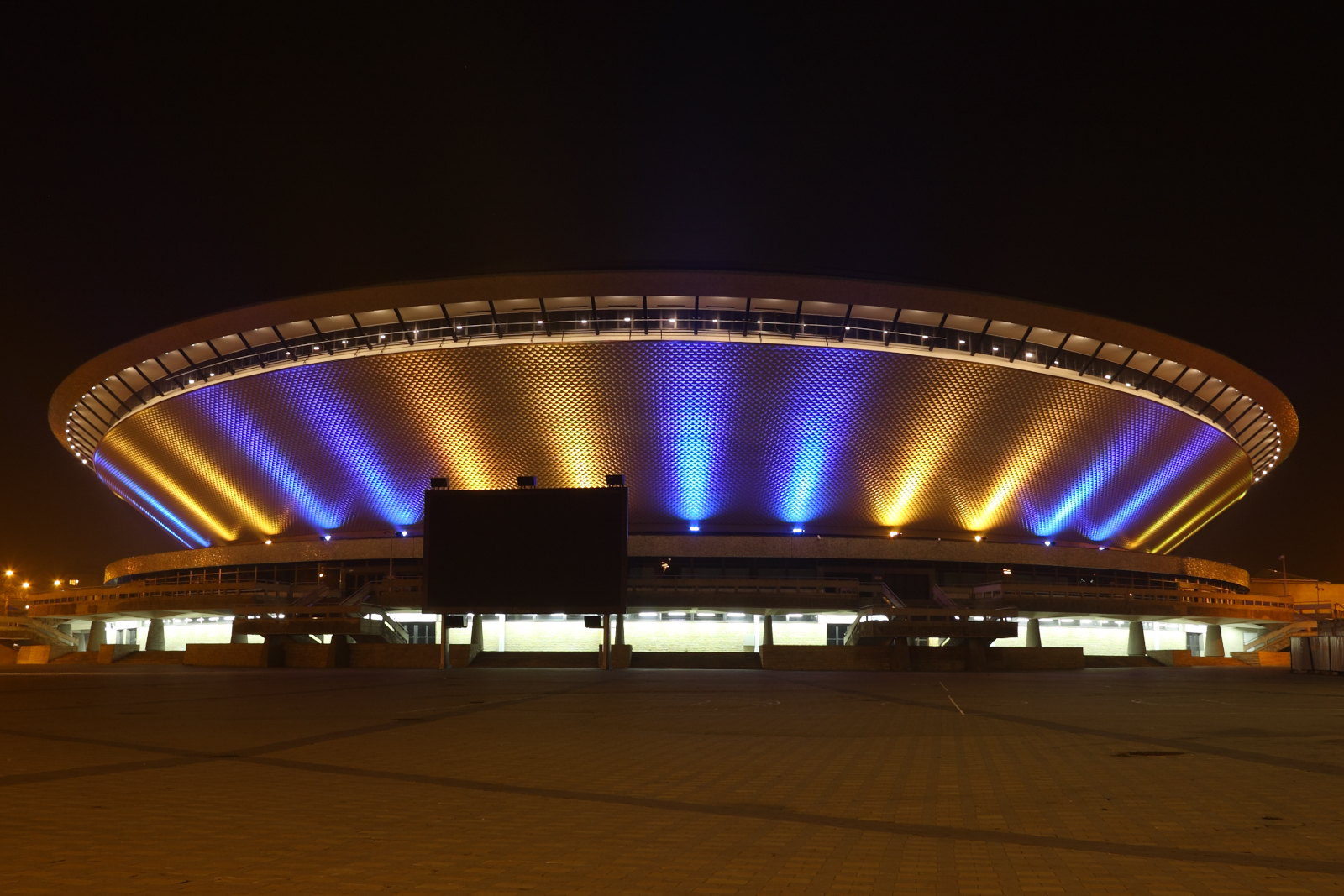
- The Spodek was the venue of the final
- Event: EuroBasket 2009
Spain	Serbia
(Spain)	(Serbia)
85	63
	1	2	3	4	Total
Spain	24	28	15	18	85
Serbia	14	15	15	19	63
- Date: 20 September 2009
- Venue: Spodek, Katowice
- Referees: Romualdas Brazauskas; Shmuel Bachar; Lazaros Voreadis
- Attendance: 10,000

The EuroBasket 2009 Final was the championship game of the EuroBasket 2009 tournament. The game was played on 20 September 2009 at the Spodek in Katowice, Poland.

Spain won their first European title by defeating Serbia 85–63.

== Final ==
20 September
21:15

Report

Spain	85–63	Serbia
Scoring by quarter: 24–14, 28–15, 15–15, 18–19
Pts: P. Gasol 18; Rebs: P. Gasol 11; Asts: Garbajosa 4		Pts: Tripković & Veličković 15; Rebs: Veličković 5 Asts: Krstić 3

Spodek, Katowice
Attendance: 10,000
Referees: Romualdas Brazauskas (LTU), Shmuel Bachar (ISR), Lazaros Voreadis (GRE)

The final was a rematch of each team's opening game, with the Spaniards attempting to avenge their 66–57 upset loss to the Serbians. Spain raced to a double-digit lead early in the first quarter, en route to an unassailable 52–29 lead at halftime. Serbia didn't catch up to hand Spain their first European Championship. Pau Gasol had a double-double with 18 points and 11 rebounds. Teammate Rudy Fernandez added 13 points and five rebounds. Uroš Tripković and Novica Veličković had 15 points each in a losing effort for the Serbs.

EuroBasket 2009 champions

Spain
First title
