= Steffen Hamann =

German basketball player (born 1981)

Personal information
- Born: 14 June 1981 (age 45) Rattelsdorf, West Germany
- Listed height: 6 ft 4.5 in (1.94 m)
- Listed weight: 200 lb (91 kg)

Career information
- NBA draft: 2003: undrafted
- Playing career: 1998–2015
- Position: Point guard

Career history
- 1998–2006: Brose Bamberg
- 2006–2007: Climamio Bologna
- 2007–2008: Brose Bamberg
- 2008–2010: Alba Berlin
- 2010–2014: Bayern Munich
- 2014–2015: Baunach Young Pikes

Career highlights
- 3× German League champion (2005, 2007, 2014); German Cup winner (2009); 5× German League All-Star (2003–2006, 2008); All-German League Second Team (2005); German League Newcomer of the Year (2003); No. 6 retired by Bayern Munich

Steffen Ewald Hamann (born 14 June 1981) is a former German professional basketball player. He played at the point guard position. Hamann was also a member of the German national basketball team.

== Professional career ==
Hamann started his professional career in 1998 at Brose Baskets's development team TSV Tröster Breitengüßbach. One year later he was a member of the first team Brose Baskets where he played until 2006.

From 2006 to 2007 he played on season for Climamio Bologna in Italian Serie A. After his short stint in Italy he returned to Bamberg in January where he played the rest of the 2006–07 and 2007–08 seasons. In 2008 he joined Alba Berlin where he played until 2010.

In 2010 he signed with Bayern Munich and became the captain of the team. He played there until 2014. In his last season he led Bayern together with star player Malcolm Delaney to its first championship since 1955 and to the EuroLeague Top 16 stage. For those achievements the club retired his No. 6 after the season.

In his last professional season he played for Baunach Young Pikes in German second division ProA.

== National team career ==
Hamann, the former captain of the senior German national team, made his national team debut on 22 January 2003, in a game against Macedonia. He played at the 2003, 2007, 2009, and 2011 EuroBaskets; and at the 2006 and 2010 FIBA World Cups.

In 2008, he led the German team, together with 13-time NBA All-Star Dirk Nowitzki, to their first Summer Olympic Games since the 1992 Summer Olympics. In all competitions, he averaged 5.3 points, 1.8 rebounds, and 2 assists per game.

== Career statistics ==
Legend
GP	Games played	GS	Games started	MPG	Minutes per game
FG%	Field-goal percentage	3P%	3-point field-goal percentage	FT%	Free-throw percentage
RPG	Rebounds per game	APG	Assists per game	SPG	Steals per game
BPG	Blocks per game	PPG	Points per game	PIR	Performance index rating
**Bold**	Career high

=== EuroLeague ===
Year	Team	GP	GS	MPG	FG%	3P%	FT%	RPG	APG	SPG	BPG	PPG	PIR
2005–06	Bamberg	10	6	18.0	.516	.250	.714	**2.5**	1.3	.6	.0	5.8	5.6
2006–07	Bologna	7	3	15.5	.500	**.333**	**.889**	1.6	**2.6**	.6	.1	4.7	5.3
2007–08	Bamberg	14	14	**26.9**	.471	.324	.758	1.9	**2.6**	**1.1**	**.2**	**8.7**	**6.9**
2008–09	Alba Berlin	**15**	**15**	17.5	**.567**	.320	.800	1.4	1.3	**1.1**	.0	4.9	4.2
2013–14	Bayern	12	0	6.7	.250	.000	.500	.5	1.3	.0	.0	.3	.2
Career		58	38	17.4	.497	.304	.755	1.6	1.8	.7	.1	5.0	4.5

Sporting positions
Preceded by ?	Bayern Munich captain 2010–2014	Succeeded by Bryce Taylor
