= Andreas Glyniadakis =

Greek basketball player (born 1981)

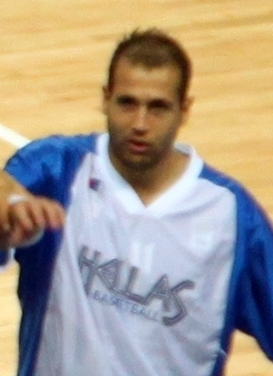
- Glyniadakis with Greece at the 2009 EuroBasket

Personal information
- Born: 26 August 1981 (age 45) Chania, Greece
- Listed height: 7 ft 1 in (2.16 m)
- Listed weight: 280 lb (127 kg)

Career information
- NBA draft: 2003: 2nd round, 58th overall pick
- Drafted by: Detroit Pistons
- Playing career: 1997–2020
- Position: Center
- Number: 9, 11, 12, 14, 35, 55

Career history
- 1997–2001: Panathinaikos
- 2001–2002: Panellinios
- 2002–2003: Peristeri Athens
- 2003–2005: AEK Athens
- 2005–2006: Roanoke Dazzle
- 2006: Albuquerque Thunderbirds
- 2006–2007: Seattle SuperSonics
- 2007: Albuquerque Thunderbirds
- 2007: Virtus Bologna
- 2007: AEK Athens
- 2007–2009: Maroussi
- 2009–2012: Olympiacos
- 2012–2013: Astana
- 2013–2014: Lietuvos rytas
- 2014: APOEL
- 2014–2015: Royal Halı Gaziantep
- 2015: Energia Rovinari
- 2015: Les Lions de Geneve
- 2015–2016: Nea Kifissia
- 2016–2017: PAOK
- 2017–2018: Kymis
- 2018–2019: Rethymno Cretan Kings
- 2019–2020: Ilysiakos

Career highlights
- 2× EuroLeague champion (2000, 2012); 5× Greek Basket League champion (1998–2001, 2012); 2× Greek Cup winner (2010, 2011); 2× Greek League All-Star (2004, 2009); Cypriot League champion (2014); Kazakh League champion (2013); Kazakh Cup winner (2013); NBA G League champion (2006)
- Stats at NBA.com
- Stats at Basketball Reference
Medals
Event	1st	2nd	3rd
FIBA EuroBasket	0	0	1
FIBA U-18 European Championship	0	0	1
Total	0	0	2
Men's basketball
FIBA EuroBasket
Bronze medal – third place	2009 Poland	
FIBA Europe Under-18 Championship
Bronze medal – third place	1998 Bulgaria	Under-18

Andreas Glyniadakis OLY (alternate spelling: Gliniadakis, Greek: Ανδρέας Γλυνιαδάκης; born 26 August 1981) is a former Greek professional basketball player, at a height of 7 ft 1 in (2.16 m) tall. During his professional club career that started in 1997 and ended in 2020, Glyniadakis played at a center position.

During his professional club career, Glyniadakis won two EuroLeague championships. He first won the EuroLeague championship in 2000, with the Greek club Panathinaikos Athens. He later won the EuroLeague championship in 2012, with the Greek club Olympiacos Piraeus. While he was part of Greece's national team, he won the bronze medal at the 2009 EuroBasket.

== Professional career ==
=== Europe ===
At the start of his career, Glyniadakis played with the youth teams of Kydonas of Chania, Crete. He then started his professional club career with the Greek Basket League team Panathinaikos Athens. After playing at Panathinaikos, he moved on to the Greek club Peristeri Athens, and then to the Greek club AEK Athens.

In May 2007, Glyniadakis signed with the Italian A League's Virtus Bologna. In September 2007, he returned to AEK Athens. However, he was waived by the club on 1 October 2007. Glyniadakis then joined the Greek team Maroussi Athens. He was chosen as the MVP of the Last 16's Week 1 in the EuroCup 2008–09 season.

In July 2009, Glyniadakis moved to the Greek EuroLeague team Olympiacos Piraeus. With Olympiacos, he won the EuroLeague and Greek League championships in 2012. After a season of playing for the Kazakhstan Championship club Astana, Glyniadakis signed with Lietuvos rytas of the Lithuanian LKL League.

On 31 January 2014, Glyniadakis signed a contract with Cypriot Division A side APOEL, and he helped the team to win the Cypriot League's championship at the end of the season. On 30 October 2014, Glyniadakis was signed by the Turkish Super League team Royal Halı Gaziantep. On 23 December 2014, he signed with Energia Rovinari of the Romanian National League, for the rest of the season.

On 14 August 2015, Glyniadakis signed with Les Lions de Geneve of the Swiss Championnat LNA. In November 2015, he left the Lions, and signed with the Greek club Nea Kifissia, for the rest of the 2015–16 season. On 21 July 2016, Glyniadakis signed with the Greek club PAOK Thessaloniki.

On 4 August 2017, Glyniadakis signed with the Greek club Kymis. On 22 August 2018, Glyniadakis returned to his home land of Crete, after nearly two decades, after he signed a one-year deal with the Rethymno Cretan Kings. Glyniadakis joined the Greek club Ilysiakos Athens, in 2019, and he retired from playing pro club basketball iun 2020.

=== NBA ===
Glyniadakis was selected by the Detroit Pistons, with the 58th overall pick of the 2003 NBA draft. In the 2005–06 season, he played with the Roanoke Dazzle of the NBA D-League. He played with the Atlanta Hawks during the 2006 NBA preseason, but he was cut before the regular season began. He also played with the Albuquerque Thunderbirds of the NBA D-League, and with them, he won the D-League championship, in the year 2006.

Glyniadakis was signed by the NBA's Seattle SuperSonics, on 5 November 2006. With the Sonics, he appeared in 13 regular season games, in which he averaged 1.3 points per game. He was waived by the Sonics on 4 January 2007.

Glyniadakis' final NBA game was played on 2 January 2007 in an 88–112 loss to the Dallas Mavericks. In his last NBA game, he recorded no stats, and only played for a total of 52 seconds, as he was substituted in at the very end of the 4th quarter, for Damien Wilkins. Glyniadakis also played with the Boston Celtics's Summer League squad in the 2007 NBA Summer League, in Las Vegas, Nevada.

== National team career ==
Glyniadakis was a member of the Greek junior national teams. With Greece's junior national teams, he played at the 1997 FIBA Europe Under-16 Championship. He won the bronze medal at the 1998 FIBA Europe Under-18 Championship. He also played at the 1999 FIBA Under-19 World Cup, and at the 2000 FIBA Europe Under-20 Championship.

Glyniadakis was also selected to the senior men's Greek national team for the 2008 Summer Olympic Games. With Greece, he won the bronze medal at the 2009 EuroBasket. He also played with Greece at the 2014 FIBA World Cup.

== Career statistics ==
Legend
GP	Games played	GS	Games started	MPG	Minutes per game
FG%	Field-goal percentage	3P%	3-point field-goal percentage	FT%	Free-throw percentage
RPG	Rebounds per game	APG	Assists per game	SPG	Steals per game
BPG	Blocks per game	PPG	Points per game	PIR	Performance index rating
**Bold**	Career high

=== Regular season ===
Year	Team	GP	GS	MPG	FG%	3P%	FT%	RPG	APG	SPG	BPG	PPG
2006–07	Seattle	13	4	6.2	.471	.000	.500	.6	.1	.0	.0	1.3
Career		13	4	6.2	.471	.000	.500	.6	.1	.0	.0	1.3

=== EuroLeague ===
†	Denotes seasons in which Glyniadakis won the EuroLeague

Year	Team	GP	GS	MPG	FG%	3P%	FT%	RPG	APG	SPG	BPG	PPG	PIR
2003–04	AEK Athens	14	11	**13.5**	.581	—	**.962**	**2.9**	.1	**.4**	**.5**	**4.4**	**4.4**
2004–05	AEK Athens	**19**	**13**	9.1	**.612**	—	.783	1.2	**.3**	.2	.3	4.1	2.5
2009–10	Olympiacos	4	2	5.0	.500	—	—	.5	—	.3	.3	1.0	1.8
2010–11	Olympiacos	3	1	6.2	.250	—	.667	.7	—	—	—	2.7	.3
2011–12†	Olympiacos	9	2	7.4	.423	—	.933	1.3	.1	.3	—	4.0	2.9
2013–14	Rytas	9	0	10.1	.412	—	.700	1.7	.1	.2	.4	2.3	.8
Career		58	29	9.8	.519	—	.850	1.6	.2	.2	.3	3.6	2.3

== Awards and achievements ==
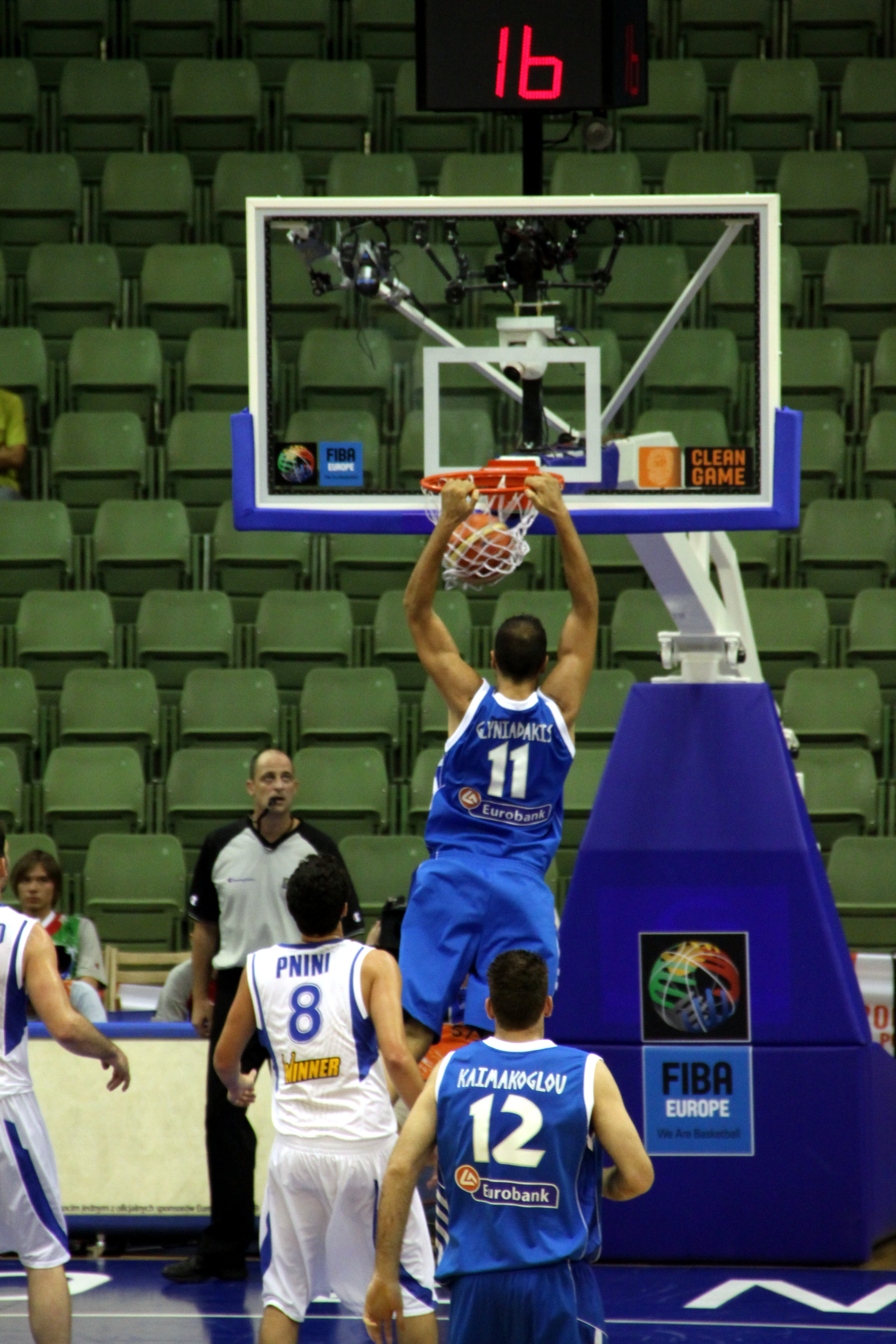
Glyniadakis dunking the ball.

=== Pro career ===
- 5× Greek League Champion: 1998, 1999, 2000, 2001, 2012
- 2× EuroLeague Champion: 2000, 2012
- 2× Greek League All-Star: 2004, 2009
- NBA G League Champion: 2006
- 2× Greek Cup Winner: 2010, 2011
- Kazakh League Champion: 2013
- Kazakh Cup Winner: 2013
- Cypriot League Champion: 2014

=== Greek junior national team ===
- 1998 FIBA Europe Under-18 Championship: Bronze

=== Greek senior national team ===
- 3× Acropolis International Tournament Champion: 2002, 2007, 2009
- 2009 EuroBasket: Bronze
