= Jarrett Hart =

British professional basketball player (born 1980)

Jarrett Albert Hart (born 4 November 1980 in London) is a British professional basketball player. He is a 1.95 m (6 ft 4¾ in) tall point guard-shooting guard. He is currently playing with Keravnos Strovolos in Cyprus. Although born in England he was raised in Little Rock, Arkansas where he was a teammate of current Atlanta Hawks guard Joe Johnson at Little Rock Central High School.

== College career ==
Hart graduated from Kansas State University in 2004 after using his last two years of collegiate eligibility at the school. He played in 53 games over two seasons with the team, and averaged 10.9 points, 3.6 rebounds, and 3.1 assists as an integral part of the Wildcat rotation as a senior.

== Professional career ==
Hart began his career in 2004. He briefly played in Croatia before signing with Maccabi Givat Shmuel of the Israeli Basketball Super League. After that, he spent time in Switzerland, Italy, Hungary, and Greece before spending the 2007–08 and 2008-09 seasons with Keravnos Strovolos of Cyprus Basketball Division 1. He helped the team to the 2007-08 Cypriot Championship and a berth in the 2008-09 EuroChallenge. In the 2008-09 season, he was named to the All-League first team and led the team back to the championship series of the Cypriot League, although they came up short, losing 3-1 to APOEL.

== British national team ==
Hart is also a member of the Great Britain national basketball team. He first played with the team at Eurobasket 2009 and was the team leader in points, rebounds, and assists in a first-round near upset of Spain.
