= Ioannis Bourousis =

Greek basketball player (born 1983)

Giannis Bourousis
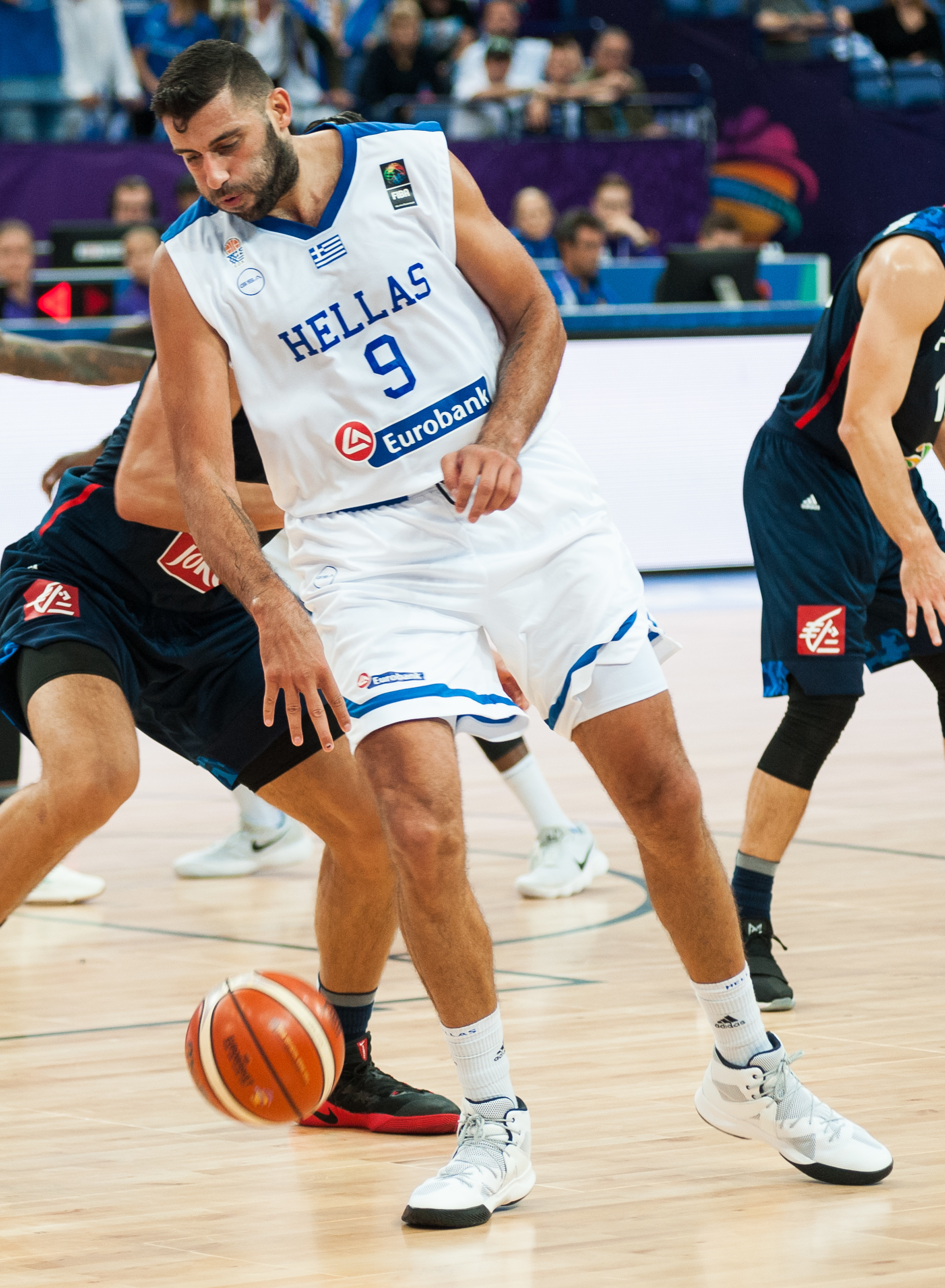
- Bourousis, playing with Greece, in 2017.

ASK Karditsa
- Title: General manager
- League: Greek Basket League

Personal information
- Born: November 17, 1983 (age 42) Karditsa, Greece
- Listed height: 7 ft 0.75 in (2.15 m)
- Listed weight: 270 lb (122 kg)

Career information
- NBA draft: 2005: undrafted
- Playing career: 2001–2022
- Position: Center
- Number: 9, 30, 29

Career history
- 2001–2006: AEK Athens
- 2006: FC Barcelona
- 2006–2011: Olympiacos
- 2011–2013: Olimpia Milano
- 2013–2015: Real Madrid
- 2015–2016: Saski Baskonia
- 2016–2017: Panathinaikos
- 2017–2019: Zhejiang Lions
- 2019–2020: Gran Canaria
- 2020–2021: Peristeri
- 2021–2022: ASK Karditsa

Career highlights
- As a player: EuroLeague champion (2015); 2× All-EuroLeague First Team (2009, 2016); Triple Crown winner (2015); EuroLeague rebounding leader (2016); FIBA EuroStar (2007); Liga ACB champion (2015); 2× Spanish Cup winner (2014, 2015); 2× Spanish Supercup winner (2013, 2014); Liga ACB MVP (2016); All-Liga ACB First Team (2016); 2× Greek League champion (2002, 2017); 3× Greek Cup winner (2010, 2011, 2017); Greek League Hall of Fame (2023); 3× All-Greek League Team (2008, 2009, 2011); 6× Greek All-Star (2006–2011); Greek All-Star Game MVP (2009); Greek 2nd Division champion (2022)
Medals
Event	1st	2nd	3rd
FIBA EuroBasket	1	0	1
FIBA U-20 European Championship	1	0	0
Total	2	0	1
Men's basketball
Representing Greece
FIBA EuroBasket
Gold medal – first place	2005 Serbia & Montenegro	
Bronze medal – third place	2009 Poland	
European U-20 Championship
Gold medal – first place	2002 Lithuania	Under-20

Ioannis Bourousis, commonly known as Giannis Bourousis (alternate spelling: Yannis, Greek: Ιωάννης "Γιάννης" Μπουρούσης; born November 17, 1983) is a Greek former professional basketball player and basketball executive. He is the general manager of the Greek basketball club ASK Karditsa. During his playing career, at a height of 7 ft 3/4 in (2.15 m) tall and a weight of 270 lb. (122 kg), Bourousis played at the center position. Bourousis, who was a two-time All-EuroLeague First Team selection, was compared to FIBA Hall of Fame / Basketball Hall of Fame center Vlade Divac, by San Antonio Spurs' head coach Gregg Popovich.

Bourousis was on the senior Greek national team that won the gold medal at 2005 FIBA EuroBasket in Serbia, and he also played an instrumental role as Greece won the bronze medal at the 2009 FIBA EuroBasket. He was also a member of the Greek national teams that finished in fourth place at the 2007 FIBA EuroBasket, and in fifth place at the 2008 Summer Olympics. The indoor basketball arena Giannis Bourousis Karditsa New Indoor Arena, which is located in Karditsa, Greece, is named after him, in his honor.

== Early years and youth career ==
Bourousis originally began his athletic career training to be a professional swimmer, but he grew too tall for the sport, and so he took up playing basketball, at the age of 18. He began playing basketball as a member of the youth clubs of the Greek club G.S. Karditsas.

== Professional career ==
Bourousis began his professional career in the year 2001, with AEK Athens of the Greek Basketball League. In 2006, he transferred to FC Barcelona of the Spanish ACB League. Later that same year, he joined the Greek EuroLeague club Olympiacos Piraeus.

In 2009, he was offered a 3-year $12 million contract by the NBA club the San Antonio Spurs. However, he turned down San Antonio's offer, and instead signed a 3-year contract extension with Olympiacos worth €5.1 million euros net income. The contract contained a €1 million buyout amount, which could only be used to sign with an NBA team. After 5 years with Olympiacos, the club decided to terminate his contract.

In the summer of 2011, just weeks before signing with Olimpia Milano, Bourousis was involved in a doping-related media controversy in Greece, after an unrelated football match-fixing probe of his (then future) father-in-law, Chrarilaos Psomiadis. However, Bourousis was quickly cleared of any suspected wrongdoing, after he submitted to drug testing for FIBA protocols, which are overseen by the World Anti-Doping Agency, in order to be cleared to play with the Greek national team at the 2011 FIBA EuroBasket.

On July 6, 2011, Bourousis agreed to a two-year contract with the Italian A League club Olimpia Milano. In July 2013, Bourousis signed a contract with the Spanish League club Real Madrid. With Real Madrid, Bourousis won the Spanish Supercup title in 2013, and the Spanish King's Cup title in 2014. In the summer of 2014, Real Madrid picked up their team option to keep him in the club for one more season.

In the 2014–15 season, Bourousis won the EuroLeague 2014–15 season championship, after his team, Real Madrid, defeated his former team, Olympiacos, by a score of 78–59 at the 2015 EuroLeague Final Four. Real Madrid also eventually finished the season winning the 2014–15 Spanish League championship, after a 3–0 series score in the ACB Finals against Barcelona. With that trophy, Bourousis' club won the Triple Crown.

In September 2015, Bourousis signed a contract with the Spanish ACB team Saski Baskonia. On December 30, 2015, he was named Spanish League Player of the Month, after being MVP of the week three times in the first half of the 2015–16 ACB season. He repeated his win again as the Spanish League's Player of the Month in January 2016, after averaging 18.5 points and 7 rebounds per game, including 24 points scored in his team's win against Real Madrid. On May 23, 2016, he was named the Spanish League's MVP of the 2015–16 season, after averaging 12.9 points, 7.1 rebounds, 2.2 assists, and 0.9 steals per game.

On July 12, 2016, Bourousis signed a two-year contract with the Greek club Panathinaikos Athens. On July 4, 2017, Panathinaikos announced the termination of Bourousis' contract. On July 10, 2017, Bourousis signed with the Zhejiang Lions of the Chinese Basketball Association (CBA).

Bourousis spent the 2020–21 season with the Greek Basketball League club Peristeri Athens. He averaged 6.6 points, 5.2 rebounds, and 1.9 assists per game. On September 28, 2021, Bourousis signed with ASK Karditsa of the Greek 2nd Division, where he played during the 2021–22 season. After that season, he retired from playing pro club basketball. After he retired, the Giannis Bourousis Karditsa New Indoor Arena, which is located in Karditsa, Greece, was named after him, in his honor.

== National team career ==
=== Greek junior national team ===
Bourousis was a member of the Greek Under-20 junior national team that won the gold medal at the 2002 FIBA Europe Under-20 Championship, in Lithuania.

=== Greek senior national team ===
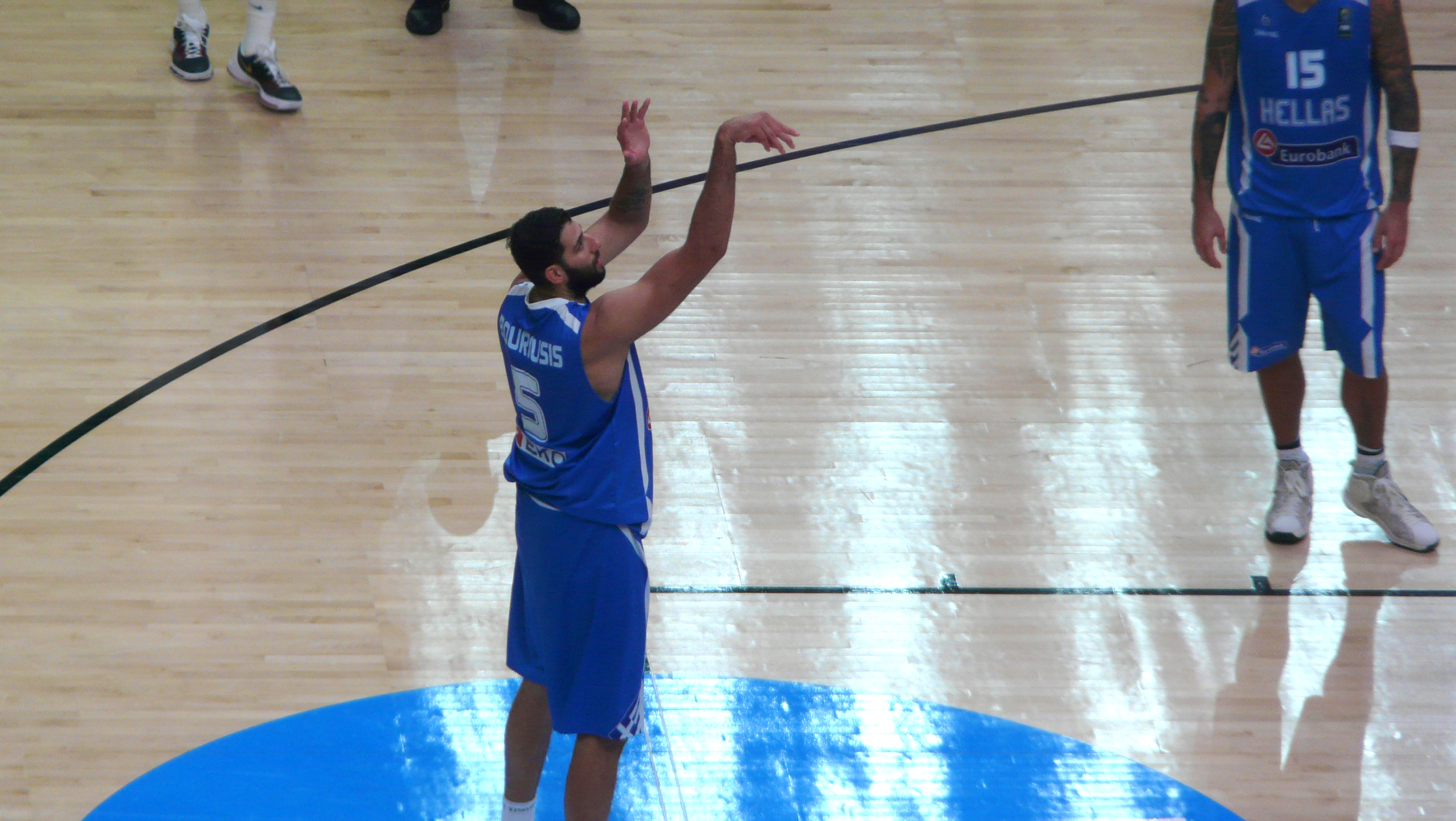
Bourousis shooting a free throw, during the 2015 FIBA EuroBasket.

Bourousis was on the senior Greek national team that won the gold medal at the 2005 FIBA EuroBasket in Serbia, and he also played an instrumental role as Greece won the bronze medal at the 2009 FIBA EuroBasket. He was also a member of the Greek national teams that finished in fourth place at the 2007 FIBA EuroBasket, and in fifth place at the 2008 Summer Olympics.

During an international friendly game between the national teams of Greece and Serbia, during the 2010 Acropolis Tournament, Serbian player Nenad Krstić, decided to hit Bourousis on the head with a chair. "I thought he was a fan attacking me", Krstić declared the next day. Bourousis first pressed charges against Krstić and decided to sue, but he quickly changed his mind and dropped the charges and the lawsuit.

Bourousis was also a member of the Greek men's national teams that competed at the: 2010 FIBA World Championship, the 2011 FIBA EuroBasket, the 2012 FIBA World Olympic Qualifying Tournament, the 2013 FIBA EuroBasket, the 2014 FIBA World Cup, the 2015 FIBA EuroBasket, the 2016 Turin FIBA World Olympic Qualifying Tournament, the 2017 FIBA EuroBasket, and the 2019 FIBA World Cup qualifiers.

== Executive career ==
After he retired from playing professional club basketball, Bourousis began working as a basketball executive. In 2021, he became the Chairman of the Board of Directors of the Greek basketball club ASK Karditsa.

== Career statistics ==
Legend
GP	Games played	GS	Games started	MPG	Minutes per game
FG%	Field-goal percentage	3P%	3-point field-goal percentage	FT%	Free-throw percentage
RPG	Rebounds per game	APG	Assists per game	SPG	Steals per game
BPG	Blocks per game	PPG	Points per game	PIR	Performance index rating
**Bold**	Career high

=== EuroLeague ===
†	Denotes seasons in which Bourousis won the EuroLeague
*	Led the league

Year	Team	GP	GS	MPG	FG%	3P%	FT%	RPG	APG	SPG	BPG	PPG	PIR
2002–03	AEK Athens	3	0	6.0	.429	.000	**1.000**	2.0	.0	.0	.0	2.7	.0
2003–04	AEK Athens	12	0	7.9	.500	.000	.429	2.2	.3	.3	.3	1.8	2.2
2004–05	AEK Athens	18	0	11.0	.510	.167	.500	3.7	.3	.4	.4	3.4	4.6
2005–06	AEK Athens	11	8	23.3	.438	.333	.833	7.2	.3	.5	.5	8.5	9.5
2006–07	Olympiacos	19	13	16.0	**.678**	.409	.727	5.7	.8	**1.1**	.7	8.6	12.7
2007–08	Olympiacos	21	10	19.4	.500	.432	.769	5.2	.5	.5	1.2	5.8	9.0
2008–09	Olympiacos	22	7	21.3	.591	.259	.625	7.4	.7	.7	.5	12.5	16.1
2009–10	Olympiacos	17	2	16.4	.531	**.471**	.765	4.8	.7	.9	.6	8.8	10.9
2010–11	Olympiacos	18	11	17.5	.530	.367	.678	6.6	.7	.6	**1.3**	10.7	14.2
2011–12	Milano	15	14	22.4	.466	.176	.688	6.4	.5	.7	.7	9.0	10.6
2012–13	Milano	9	8	24.1	.573	.385	.745	8.3	1.1	.7	.7	14.0	18.9
2013–14	Real Madrid	29	**29**	21.0	.524	.353	.817	5.9	.9	.4	.8	8.3	12.1
2014–15†	Real Madrid	28	10	11.8	.505	.200	.727	3.3	.9	.5	.4	5.0	6.8
2015–16	Baskonia	29	0	**25.1**	.502	.383	.811	**8.7***	**2.2**	.8	.8	**14.5**	**21.1**
2016–17	Panathinaikos	**33**	7	18.2	.399	.291	.788	4.8	1.0	.5	.5	7.8	10.1
Career		284	119	18.2	.513	.345	.744	5.6	.9	.6	.7	8.5	11.5

=== Domestic leagues ===
Season	Team	League	GP	MPG	2P%	3P%	FT%	RPG	APG	SPG	BPG	PPG
2001–02	AEK Athens	GBL	3	1.7	.667	--	.667	1.3	.0	.0	.0	2.0
2002–03	AEK Athens	GBL	8	4.3	.429	--	--	1.1	.1	.0	.0	.8
2003–04	AEK Athens	GBL	20	12.1	.714	--	.682	4.2	.2	.5	.1	5.3
2004–05	AEK Athens	GBL	24	11.3	.580	.333	.649	3.9	.4	.2	.3	4.7
2005–06	AEK Athens	GBL	25	25.5	.558	.321	.765	8.4	.6	1.3	1.0	10.5
2005–06	FC Barcelona	ACB	3	3.7	.333	--	--	1.0	.3	.3	.0	.7
2006–07	Olympiacos	GBL	24	18.3	.610	.357	.775	7.2	.8	.7	1.1	9.8
2007–08	Olympiacos	GBL	25	19.9	.660	.405	.745	7.5	1.2	.6	1.2	9.0
2008–09	Olympiacos	GBL	32	20.9	.617	.439	.742	7.5	.9	.7	.9	11.9
2009–10	Olympiacos	GBL	26	17.9	.560	.200	.743	5.3	1.1	.8	.7	9.7
2010–11	Olympiacos	GBL	30	20.6	.636	.333	.817	6.6	1.2	1.0	1.1	11.7
2011–12	Milano	LBA	43	19.0	.622	.347	.755	5.8	1.0	.5	.7	11.6
2012–13	Milano	LBA	34	20.5	.631	.322	.769	6.8	1.1	.7	.6	11.5
2013–14	Real Madrid	ACB	40	18.7	.591	.236	.831	4.6	.7	.7	.5	6.9
2014–15	Real Madrid	ACB	31	14.6	.544	.313	.733	3.7	.9	.4	.4	5.2
2015–16	Baskonia	ACB	32	22.8	.572	.370	.881	7.1	2.2	.9	.2	12.9
2016–17	Panathinaikos	GBL	35	19.3	.592	.173	.741	5.6	1.6	.6	.6	10.7

== Awards and accomplishments ==
=== Greece men's national team ===
==== Under-20 ====
- 2002 FIBA Europe Under-20 Championship: Gold

==== Senior ====
- 2005 FIBA EuroBasket: Gold
- 2009 FIBA EuroBasket: Bronze

=== Club career ===
AEK Athens

- Greek League Champion: (2002)

Olympiacos

- 2× Greek Cup Winner: (2010, 2011)

Real Madrid

- EuroLeague Champion (2015)
- Spanish League Champion: (2015)
- 2× Spanish Cup Winner: (2014, 2015)
- 2× Spanish Supercup Winner: (2013, 2014)
- Triple Crown: Champion (2015)

Panathinaikos

- Greek League Champion: (2017)
- Greek Cup Winner: (2017)

ASK Karditsas

- Greek 2nd Division Champion: (2022)

=== Individual ===
- 2× All-EuroLeague First Team: (2009, 2016)
- EuroLeague MVP of the Month: (March 2016)
- 8× EuroLeague MVP of the Round
- EuroLeague rebounding leader (2016)
- Eurobasket.com's All-Euroleague Defensive Team: (2011)
- FIBA EuroStar: (2007)
- Spanish League MVP: (2016)
- All-Spanish League Team: (2016)
- 2× Spanish League Player of the Month: (December 2015, January 2016)
- 6× Greek League All-Star: (2006, 2007, 2008, 2009, 2010, 2011)
- Greek All-Star Game MVP: (2009)
- 3× Greek League Best Five: (2008, 2009, 2011)
- 2× All-Greek League Defensive Team: (2010 2011)
- Greek League rebounding leader: (2007)
- 4× Eurobasket.com's All-Greek League Defensive Team: (2007, 2008, 2010, 2011)
- Greek League Hall of Fame: 2023
