= Uroš Tripković =

Serbian basketball player

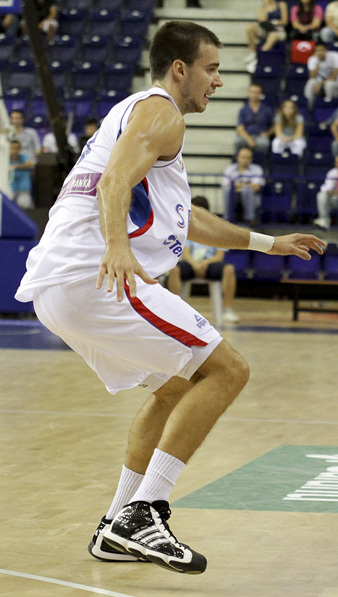
- Tripković with Serbia in August 2011

Personal information
- Born: September 11, 1986 (age 40) Čačak, SR Serbia, SFR Yugoslavia
- Listed height: 6 ft 5 in (1.96 m)
- Listed weight: 195 lb (88 kg)

Career information
- NBA draft: 2008: undrafted
- Playing career: 2002–2014
- Position: Shooting guard
- Number: 11, 10, 4

Career history
- 2002–2009: Partizan
- 2009–2010: Joventut Badalona
- 2010–2012: Unicaja Málaga
- 2012: Valladolid
- 2012–2013: Fenerbahçe
- 2013–2014: Vanoli Cremona

Career highlights
- 3× Adriatic League champion (2007–2009); 3× Serbian League champion (2007–2009); 4× Serbia and Montenegro League champion (2003–2006); 2× Radivoj Korać Cup winner (2008–2009); Turkish Cup winner (2013)
Medals
Men's basketball
Representing Serbia
FIBA EuroBasket
Silver medal – second place	2009 Poland	Team
Representing Serbia and Montenegro
U20 European Championship
Bronze medal – third place	2005 Russia	Team

Uroš Tripković (Serbian Cyrillic: Урош Трипковић; born September 11, 1986) is a Serbian former professional basketball player. He represented the Serbian national basketball team internationally. Standing at 6 ft 5 in (1.96 m), he played as a shooting guard and was known as a good 3-point shooter.

== Player profile ==
Tripković was a skilled guard and a prolific 3-point shooter. He was considered by many to be one of the best young guards in Europe. He was a natural scorer with a great release on his jump shots and very good shooting mechanics. He was also an excellent free throw shooter. He played the point guard position when he was younger, but later shooting guard was his main position.

== Professional career ==
Tripković grew up with the Borac Čačak youth system. He started his professional career in 2002 with KK Partizan. In 2009, he moved to the Liga ACB side DKV Joventut. In August 2010, he moved to Unicaja Málaga. On January 5, 2012, he parted ways with the club and became free agent.

In September 2012, after more than half year of not playing for anyone, Tripković started talks with the Italian club Virtus Bologna, but few days after negotiations have been broken down. Finally, he signed a contract with the Spanish club CB Valladolid. In December 2012, he moved to Turkey and signed a 1.5 year contract with Fenerbahçe Ülker. However he left Fenerbahçe at the end of the season.

On October 30, 2013, he signed a one-year deal with the Italian team Vanoli Cremona. After he suffered a season-ending injury, Cremona decided to part ways with him in January 2014.

On October 8, 2014, Tripković announced his retirement from the professional basketball, due to the injuries he suffered over the previous few seasons.

== National team career ==
Tripković was a member of the senior men's Serbia and Montenegro national basketball team at the 2006 FIBA World Championship. After missing the EuroBasket 2007 due to injuries, he won the silver medal at the EuroBasket 2009 with the Serbian national basketball team. He skipped the 2010 FIBA World Championship, due to a foot injury.

== Post-playing career ==
Tripković owns and operates blueberry orchards, the first orchard is in Preljina, near his hometown Čačak, and the second-one is near Topola.

== EuroLeague career statistics ==
Legend
GP	Games played	GS	Games started	MPG	Minutes per game
FG%	Field-goal percentage	3P%	3-point field-goal percentage	FT%	Free-throw percentage
RPG	Rebounds per game	APG	Assists per game	SPG	Steals per game
BPG	Blocks per game	PPG	Points per game	PIR	Performance index rating
**Bold**	Career high

Led the league

Year	Team	GP	GS	MPG	FG%	3P%	FT%	RPG	APG	SPG	BPG	PPG	PIR
2002–03	Partizan	3	0	1.7	.000	.000	.000	.3	.0	.0	.0	.0	.7
2003–04	Partizan	1	0	2.0	.000	.000	.000	2.0	.0	.0	.0	.0	.0
2004–05	Partizan	14	7	26.2	.362	.355	.969	1.3	1.4	1.0	.0	**10.7**	4.7
2005–06	Partizan	12	11	**28.3**	.336	.286	.650	1.3	**1.9**	**1.3**	**.1**	10.3	3.3
2006–07	Partizan	19	**14**	25.1	.385	.347	.794	**2.1**	1.2	1.0	.0	10.0	4.6
2007–08	Partizan	**23**	9	18.8	.363	.314	.783	1.8	1.0	.2	.0	7.1	1.7
2008–09	Partizan	19	2	23.3	.359	.387	.811	1.7	.7	.4	.0	10.1	4.1
2010–11	Unicaja	15	4	17.9	**.413**	.397	.917	1.5	1.1	.7	.0	8.1	**5.4**
2012–13	Fenerbahçe	7	1	10.8	.346	**.429**	**1.000**	.7	.7	.4	.0	4.3	1.3
Career		113	48	21.3	.367	.349	.829	1.6	1.1	.7	.0	8.6	3.5

== See also ==
- List of Serbia men's national basketball team players
- List of youngest EuroLeague players
