= Lazaros Voreadis =

Greek basketball referee (born 1960)

Lazaros Voreadis (born July 18, 1960 in Thessaloniki) is a retired Greek basketball referee, who has officiated in many international basketball tournaments of FIFA.

== Biography ==
Voreadis was born in Thessaloniki, Greece, and he speaks both Greek and English.

== Refereeing career ==
Residing in Athens, Greece, Lazaros Voreadis began his career as a basketball referee in 1978 and became an international referee in 1992, officiating at various prominent international events, including the Olympics. He officiated at the 7th World Championship for Junior Men at Thessaloniki in the year 2003. He officiated the finals of the Saporta Cup and the Korać Cup in 2002, within 15 days of each other. Voreadis officiated at the 2004 Olympic Basketball Tournament and he took the Judge's Oath at the opening ceremony to the Games. He was also a referee at the 2003 European Championship for Men. He stepped down from refereeing in 2010, marking the end of his career in active officiating.

During a derby game between Olympiakos and Panathinaikos in the Greek Basketball League game in 2002, he was struck by a projectile thrown by an Olympiakos fan and was comforted by colleague Nikos Papadimitriou.

Voreadis has, from time to time, given interviews and made public statements criticizing both the shortcomings of Greek basketball and the actions of the Hellenic Basketball Federation.
