= Jan Jagla =

German basketball player (born 1981)

Jan-Hendrik Jagla
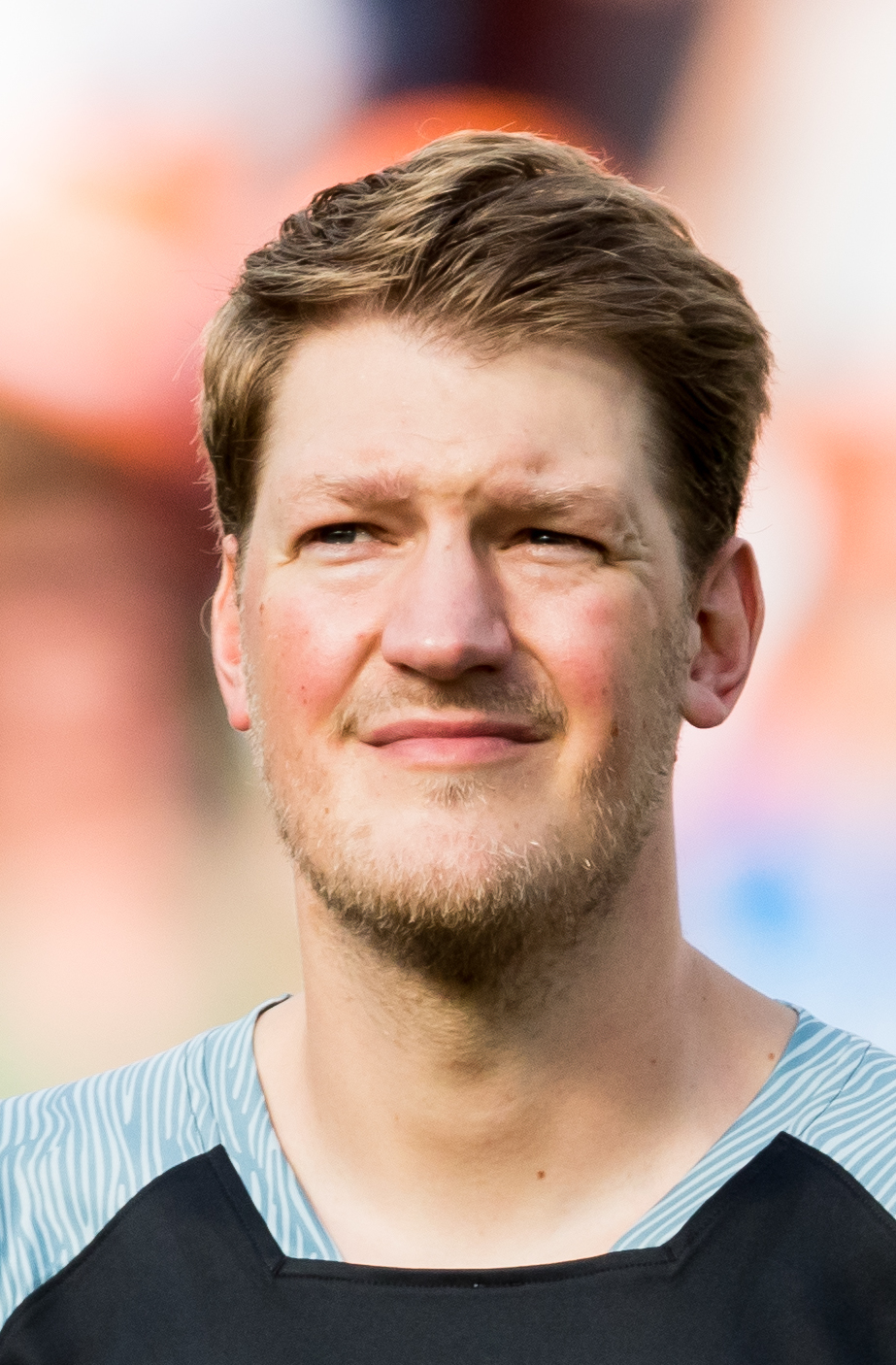
- Jagla in 2019

Personal information
- Born: 25 June 1981 (age 45) Berlin, West Germany
- Listed height: 7 ft 0 in (2.13 m)
- Listed weight: 231 lb (105 kg)

Career information
- High school: Highland (Medina, Ohio)
- College: Penn State (2001–2004)
- NBA draft: 2004: undrafted
- Playing career: 1999–2015
- Position: Power forward

Career history
- 1999–2001: TuS Lichterfelde
- 2001: Alba Berlin
- 2004: Panellinios
- 2004–2005: Artland Dragons
- 2005–2006: Drac Inca Mallorca
- 2006–2007: Türk Telekom
- 2007–2009: Joventut Badalona
- 2009–2010: Asseco Prokom Gdynia
- 2010–2011: Türk Telekom
- 2011–2013: Bayern Munich
- 2013–2014: Alba Berlin
- 2014–2015: Bayern Munich

Career highlights
- ULEB Cup champion (2008); Polish League champion (2010); Spanish Cup champion (2008); German Cup champion (2014); Bundesliga All-Star (2013); TBL All-Star (2007)

Jan-Hendrik Jagla (born 25 June 1981) is a former German professional basketball player. Though he stands 7 feet tall, Jagla has the game of a 2-guard, and his game somewhat resembles that of Dirk Nowitzki. Jagla was also known to be a point forward in his college days. He is married to Ivana, a daughter of Svetislav Pešić.

== Amateur career ==
He spent three seasons (2001–2004) at the Pennsylvania State University in University Park, Pennsylvania, before turning pro. He finished his Penn State career with 813 points, 504 rebounds and ranks third in school history with 110 blocked shots. Jagla holds the Penn State record for consecutive missed three point shots, 33. He played one year of high school basketball as an exchange student at Highland High School in Granger Township of Medina, Ohio, where he led the Hornets to their first Suburban League Championship in 1998.

== Professional career ==
He played for Türk Telekom B.K. of the Turkish Basketball League during the 2006–07 season. He played for Joventut Badalona in Spain. Polish champion Asseco Prokom Gdynia signed him on 22 September 2009. In December, 2010 he returned to Türk Telekom B.K. until the end of the 2010–11 season. In July 2011 he returned to Germany by signing with Bayern Munich a two-year contract. In August 2013, he returned after 12 years to his former club Alba Berlin. In August 2014, he signed a one-year deal with Bayern Munich.

On 16 July 2015, he retired from professional basketball.

== German national team ==
Jagla participated in the 2008 Olympics with the German national team.

== See also ==
- List of Pennsylvania State University Olympians
