= Davor Kus =

Croatian basketball player

Personal information
- Born: July 21, 1978 (age 48) Rijeka, SR Croatia, SFR Yugoslavia
- Listed height: 6 ft 3.75 in (1.92 m)
- Listed weight: 201 lb (91 kg)

Career information
- NBA draft: 2000: undrafted
- Playing career: 1996–2016
- Position: Point guard / shooting guard

Career history
- 1996–2000: Kvarner
- 2000–2004: Cibona
- 2004–2005: AEK Athens
- 2005–2007: Cibona
- 2007–2008: Unicaja Málaga
- 2008–2009: Cibona
- 2009–2010: Benetton Treviso
- 2010–2011: Fuenlabrada
- 2011–2015: Cibona
- 2015–2016: Škrljevo

Career highlights
- Adriatic League winner (2014); 8× Croatian League champion (2001–2007, 2009, 2012, 2013); 4× Croatian Cup winner (2001, 2002, 2009, 2013)

Davor Kus (born July 21, 1978) is a Croatian former professional basketball player. His natural position was point guard, although he can also feature as a shooting guard.

== Player profile ==
Kus is known for his technical proficiency, precise passing and accurate jump shot. He was one of Cibona's top scorers and essential offensive players, although his road game statistics often go against his overall stats, as he is known for his inability to score as much in away games. Kus also has a very high percentage of scored free throws.

== Professional career ==
Kus started his career in his hometown, playing for Kvarner from the start of 1996 until the end of the 1999–2000 season. He led the 1998–99 season of the Croatian League in assists at 4.4 per game. Besides that, Kus made no larger impact with Kvarner in the Croatian League.

At the start of the 2000–01 season, Kus moved to the Croatian champions Cibona Zagreb, winning with them the Croatian League and the Croatian Cup in his very first season. In the next three years, Kus was a part of three consecutive Croatian League titles and one Croatian Cup title. Moving abroad to the Greek League club AEK Athens, Kus started with his international career which has not led him to much success. After just one season he moved back to Croatia, signing with Cibona again. He led Cibona to another two consecutive Croatian League titles before his contract was mutually terminated and he was to move abroad again.

In the 2007–08 season, Kus moved his residence to Málaga, Spain, as he was signed by the successful Spanish League club, Unicaja Málaga. Spending just one season in Spain, Kus moved back to Cibona for the third time, this time on a one-year loan spell. Kus was very unhappy with his status at the Spanish club and even tried to ask for the termination of his contract, but Málaga did not want to give him easily, so his being loaned to Cibona was a temporary solution to his frustrations.

In 2009, he signed with the Italian League club Benetton Treviso.

In October 2010 he signed a one-year contract with Baloncesto Fuenlabrada in Spain.

After two seasons spent abroad, Kus returned to Croatia signing with Cibona Zagreb. In June 2015, he announced his retirement, but then in September 2015 signed for Škrljevo.

== Croatian national team ==
Kus debuted for the senior Croatian national basketball team in 2007. He was a part of the Croatian 2007 FIBA European Championship squad which finished in 6th place. He was also a part of the Croatian Summer Olympics 2008 team, which finished in 6th place as well.

== Miscellaneous ==
- Davor Kus was Unicaja's best scorer in a surprising victory over the NBA side Memphis Grizzlies on October 9, 2007. He scored 20 points and collected one rebound and one assist.
- On November 26, 2008, Kus played a very important role in his club's victory after an extra period against Air Avellino in the Euroleague group stage. The game finished with a final score of 82–79 for Cibona, and Kus ended up scoring 23 points, with which he reached his milestone 1000th point in the Euroleague competition.
