= Romualdas Brazauskas =

Lithuanian basketball referee

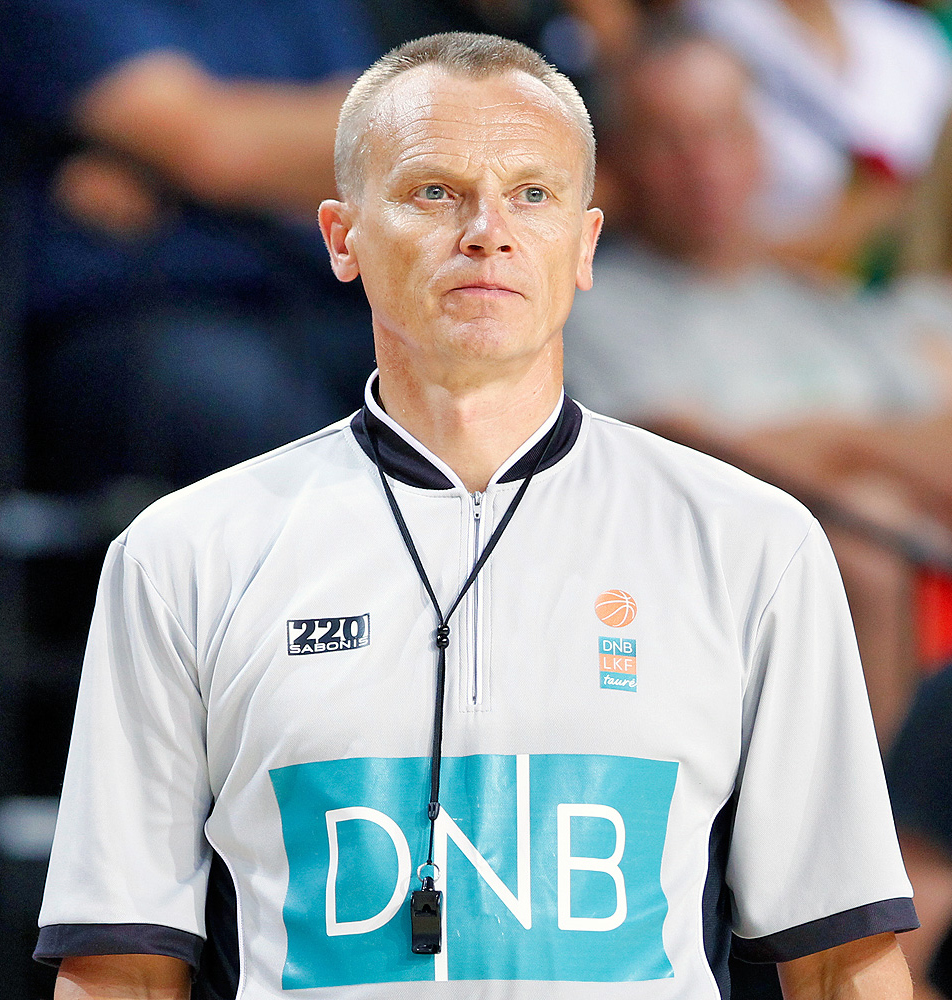
Brazauskas officiating a game.

Romualdas Brazauskas (born July 31, 1960 in Biržai) is a Lithuanian basketball referee. After graduation from Vilnius Pedagogical Institute in 1983, Brazauskas became a FIBA judge in 1987 and since then he has judged basketball games in the Olympics, FIBA European and World Championships, Euroleague (including ten final games). In 2010, Brazauskas was awarded a Golden Whistle by FIBA at the World Championship in Turkey becoming a second person in history to receive this honorary award.

He is the chief judge at the Lithuanian Women's Basketball League, member of the Executive Committee of the Lithuanian Basketball Judge Association Executive Committee, and director of the Lithuanian Basketball League.

== Major championships ==
Major championships, which he refereed:

- 1995 Eurobasket, Athens
- 1997 EuroBasket, Barcelona
- 1999 Eurobasket, Paris
- 2001 EuroBasket, Istanbul
- 2009 EuroBasket, Poland (including the finals)
- 1998 Goodwill Games, New York
- 1998 FIBA World Championship, Athens,
- 2002 FIBA World Championship, Indianapolis
- 2006 FIBA World Championship, Saitama
- 2010 FIBA World Championship, Istanbul
- 1992 Summer Olympics, Barcelona
- 1996 Summer Olympics, Atlanta (including women tournament's final)
- 2000 Summer Olympics, Sydney (including men tournament's final)
- 2008 Summer Olympics, Beijing (including men tournament's final)
