= 2017 FIFA Confederations Cup statistics =

Football tournament statistics

These are the statistics for the 2017 FIFA Confederations Cup, an eight-team tournament that ran from 17 June 2017 through 2 July 2017. The tournament took place in Russia.

== Goalscorers ==
There were 43 goals scored in 16 matches, for an average of 2.69 goals per match.

3 goals

- (Germany) Leon Goretzka
- (Germany) Lars Stindl
- (Germany) Timo Werner

2 goals

- (Portugal) Cristiano Ronaldo

1 goal

- (Australia) Tomi Juric
- (Australia) Mark Milligan
- (Australia) Tom Rogic
- (Australia) James Troisi
- (Cameroon) Vincent Aboubakar
- (Cameroon) André-Frank Zambo Anguissa
- (Chile) Martín Rodríguez
- (Chile) Alexis Sánchez
- (Chile) Eduardo Vargas
- (Chile) Arturo Vidal
- (Germany) Kerem Demirbay
- (Germany) Julian Draxler
- (Germany) Amin Younes
- (Mexico) Néstor Araujo
- (Mexico) Marco Fabián
- (Mexico) Javier Hernández
- (Mexico) Raúl Jiménez
- (Mexico) Hirving Lozano
- (Mexico) Héctor Moreno
- (Mexico) Oribe Peralta
- (New Zealand) Chris Wood
- (Portugal) Adrien Silva
- (Portugal) Cédric
- (Portugal) Nani
- (Portugal) Pepe
- (Portugal) Ricardo Quaresma
- (Portugal) André Silva
- (Portugal) Bernardo Silva
- (Russia) Aleksandr Samedov
- (Russia) Fyodor Smolov

1 own goal

- (New Zealand) Michael Boxall (against Russia)
- (Portugal) Luís Neto (against Mexico)

Source: FIFA

== Assists ==
3 assists

- (Mexico) Héctor Herrera

2 assists

- (Germany) Jonas Hector
- (Germany) Benjamin Henrichs
- (Germany) Joshua Kimmich
- (Germany) Timo Werner

1 assist

- (Australia) Robbie Kruse
- (Cameroon) Michael Ngadeu-Ngadjui
- (Cameroon) Moumi Ngamaleu
- (Chile) Alexis Sánchez
- (Chile) Eduardo Vargas
- (Chile) Arturo Vidal
- (Germany) Julian Brandt
- (Germany) Emre Can
- (Germany) Julian Draxler
- (Mexico) Javier Aquino
- (Mexico) Jonathan dos Santos
- (Mexico) Marco Fabián
- (Mexico) Carlos Vela
- (New Zealand) Clayton Lewis
- (Portugal) Eliseu
- (Portugal) Raphaël Guerreiro
- (Portugal) Ricardo Quaresma
- (Portugal) Cristiano Ronaldo
- (Portugal) André Silva
- (Russia) Aleksandr Samedov
- (Russia) Aleksandr Yerokhin

Source: FIFA

== Scoring ==
- Total number of goals scored: 43
- Average goals per match: 2.69
- Total number of hat-tricks: 0
- Most goals scored by a team: 12 – Germany
- Most goals scored by an individual: 3 – Leon Goretzka, Lars Stindl, Timo Werner
- Most assists provided by an individual: 3 – Héctor Herrera
- Most goals and assists produced by an individual: 3 goals and 2 assists – Timo Werner
- Fewest goals scored by a team: 1 – New Zealand
- Most goals conceded by a team: 10 – Mexico
- Fewest goals conceded by a team: 3 – Chile, Portugal
- Best goal difference: +7 – Germany
- Worst goal difference: −7 – New Zealand
- Most goals scored in a match by both teams: 5 – Germany (3) and Australia (2), Germany (4) and Mexico (1)
- Most goals scored in a match by one team: 4 – Portugal against New Zealand, Germany against Mexico
- Most goals scored in a match by the losing team: 2 – Australia against Germany (3)
- Biggest margin of victory: 4 goals – Portugal against New Zealand
- Most clean sheets achieved by a team: 3 – Portugal
- Fewest clean sheets achieved by a team: 0 – Australia, Cameroon, Mexico, New Zealand
- Most clean sheets given by an opposing team: 2 – New Zealand
- Fewest clean sheets given by an opposing team: 0 – Australia, Germany, Mexico
- Most consecutive clean sheets achieved by a team: 3 – Portugal
- Most consecutive clean sheets given by an opposing team: 2 – Chile
- First goal of the tournament: Michael Boxall (own goal) for Russia against New Zealand
- Fastest goal in a match from kickoff: 5th minute – Lars Stindl for Germany against Australia
- Latest goal in a match without extra time: 90+1st minute – Héctor Moreno for Mexico against Portugal, Eduardo Vargas for Chile against Cameroon, Nani for Portugal against New Zealand, Amin Younes for Germany against Mexico, Pepe for Portugal against Mexico
- Latest winning goal in a match without extra time: 81st minute – Arturo Vidal for Chile against Cameroon
- Most goals scored by one player in a match: 2 – Timo Werner for Germany against Cameroon, Leon Goretzka for Germany against Mexico
- Oldest goal scorer: 34 years, 4 months and 6 days old – Pepe for Portugal against Mexico
- Youngest goal scorer: 21 years, 3 months and 19 days old – Timo Werner for Germany against Cameroon

== Man of the Match ==
Rank	Name	Team	Awards	Against
1	(Portugal) Cristiano Ronaldo	Portugal	3	Mexico (GS), Russia (GS), New Zealand (GS)
2	(Australia) James Troisi	Australia	1	Chile (GS)
2	(Cameroon) André-Frank Zambo Anguissa	Cameroon	1	Australia (GS)
2	(Chile) Claudio Bravo	Chile	1	Portugal (SF)
2	(Chile) Alexis Sánchez	Chile	1	Germany (GS)
2	(Chile) Arturo Vidal	Chile	1	Cameroon (GS)
2	(Germany) Julian Draxler	Germany	1	Australia (GS)
2	(Germany) Leon Goretzka	Germany	1	Mexico (SF)
2	(Germany) Marc-André ter Stegen	Germany	1	Chile (F)
2	(Germany) Timo Werner	Germany	1	Cameroon (GS)
2	(Mexico) Javier Aquino	Mexico	1	New Zealand (GS)
2	(Mexico) Hirving Lozano	Mexico	1	Russia (GS)
2	(Mexico) Guillermo Ochoa	Mexico	1	Portugal (TP)
2	(Russia) Fyodor Smolov	Russia	1	New Zealand (GS)

== Overall statistics ==
Team	Pld	W	D	L	Pts	APts	GF	AGF	GA	AGA	GD	AGD	CS	ACS	YC	AYC	RC	ARC
Russia	3	1	0	2	3	1.00	3	1.00	3	1.00	0	0.00	1	0.33	6	2.00	1	0.33
New Zealand	3	0	0	3	0	0.00	1	0.33	8	2.67	−7	−2.33	0	0.00	4	1.33	0	0.00
Portugal	5	3	2	0	11	2.20	9	1.80	3	0.60	+6	1.20	3	0.60	13	2.60	1	0.20
Mexico	5	2	1	2	7	1.40	8	1.60	10	2.00	−2	−0.40	0	0.00	10	2.00	1	0.20
Cameroon	3	0	1	2	1	0.33	2	0.67	6	2.00	−4	−1.33	0	0.00	2	0.67	1	0.33
Chile	5	1	3	1	6	1.20	4	0.80	3	0.60	+1	0.20	2	0.40	10	2.00	0	0.00
Australia	3	0	2	1	2	0.67	4	1.33	5	1.67	−1	−0.33	0	0.00	6	2.00	0	0.00
**Germany**	5	4	1	0	13	2.60	12	2.40	5	1.00	+7	1.40	1	0.20	8	1.60	0	0.00
Total	16^{(1)}	11	5^{(2)}	11	43	1.34	43	1.34	43	1.34	0	0.00	7	0.22	60	1.88	4	0.13

Team(s) rendered in italics represent(s) the host nation(s). The competition's winning team is rendered in bold.
^{(1)} – Total games lost not counted in total games played (total games lost = total games won)
^{(2)} – Total number of games drawn (tied) for all teams = Total number of games drawn (tied) ÷ 2 (both teams involved)

== Stadiums ==
Stadium	City	Capacity	Matches played	Overall attendance	Average attendance per match	Average attendance as % of Capacity	Overall goals scored	Average goals scored per match
Krestovsky Stadium	Saint Petersburg	68,134	4	198830	49,718	69.3	9	2.25
Otkrytiye Arena	Moscow	45,360	4	152549	38,137	80.8	8	2
Kazan Arena	Kazan	45,379	4	155034	38,759	85.4	9	2.25
Fisht Olympic Stadium	Sochi	47,659	4	121891	30,473	64.0	17	4.25
Total		206532	16	628304	39,269	74.1	43	2.69
