= 2017 FIFA Confederations Cup knockout stage =

Football tournament knockout stage

The knockout stage of the 2017 FIFA Confederations Cup began on 28 June with the semi-final round, and concluded on 2 July 2017 with the final at the Krestovsky Stadium in Saint Petersburg. The top two teams from each group advanced to the knockout stage to compete in a single-elimination style tournament. A third-third-place play-off also took place and was played between the two losing teams in the semi-finals.

In the knockout stage, if a match was level at the end of normal playing time, extra time was played (two periods of 15 minutes each), where each team was allowed to make a fourth substitution. If still tied after extra time, the match was decided by a penalty shoot-out to determine the winners.

All times Moscow Time (UTC+3).

== Qualified teams ==
| Group | Winners | Runners-up |
|---|---|---|
| A | Portugal | Mexico |
| B | Germany | Chile |

== Bracket ==
Semi-finals
28 June — Kazan
Portugal | 0 (0)
Chile (p) | 0 (3)
29 June — Sochi
Germany | 4
Mexico | 1

Final
2 July — Saint Petersburg
Chile | 0
Germany | 1
Third place play-off
2 July — Moscow
Portugal (a.e.t.) | 2
Mexico | 1

== Semi-finals ==
=== Portugal vs Chile ===
28 June 2017
21:00

| Portugal | 0–0 (a.e.t.) | Chile |
|---|---|---|
| | Report |
Penalties
| Quaresma (penalty missed); Moutinho (penalty missed); Nani (penalty missed) | 0–3 | (penalty scored) Vidal; (penalty scored) Aránguiz; (penalty scored) Sánchez |

Kazan Arena, Kazan
Attendance: 40,855
Referee: Alireza Faghani (Iran)

| Portugal | Chile |

| GK | 1 | Rui Patrício |
| RB | 21 | Cédric | (yellow card) 115' |
| CB | 2 | Bruno Alves | (yellow card) 111' |
| CB | 6 | José Fonte | (yellow card) 96' |
| LB | 19 | Eliseu |
| RM | 10 | Bernardo Silva | | (substituted off) 83' |
| CM | 23 | Adrien Silva | | (substituted off) 102' |
| CM | 14 | William Carvalho | (yellow card) 31' |
| LM | 15 | André Gomes | | (substituted off) 116' |
| CF | 9 | André Silva | (yellow card) 43' | (substituted off) 76' |
| CF | 7 | Cristiano Ronaldo (c) |
Substitutions:
| FW | 17 | Nani | | (substituted on) 76' |
| FW | 20 | Ricardo Quaresma | | (substituted on) 83' |
| MF | 8 | João Moutinho | | (substituted on) 102' |
| FW | 18 | Gelson Martins | | (substituted on) 116' |
Manager:
Fernando Santos

| GK | 1 | Claudio Bravo (c) |
| RB | 4 | Mauricio Isla | | (substituted off) 120' |
| CB | 17 | Gary Medel |
| CB | 18 | Gonzalo Jara | (yellow card) 23' |
| LB | 15 | Jean Beausejour |
| DM | 21 | Marcelo Díaz |
| CM | 20 | Charles Aránguiz |
| CM | 10 | Pablo Hernández | (yellow card) 51' | (substituted off) 112' |
| AM | 8 | Arturo Vidal |
| CF | 11 | Eduardo Vargas | | (substituted off) 86' |
| CF | 7 | Alexis Sánchez |
Substitutions:
| FW | 16 | Martín Rodríguez | | (substituted on) 86' |
| MF | 5 | Francisco Silva | | (substituted on) 112' |
| MF | 6 | José Pedro Fuenzalida | | (substituted on) 120' |
Manager:
(Spain) Juan Antonio Pizzi

Man of the Match:
Claudio Bravo (Chile)

Assistant referees:
Reza Sokhandan (Iran)
Mohammadreza Mansouri (Iran)
Fourth official:
Fahad Al-Mirdasi (Saudi Arabia)
Video assistant referees:
Ravshan Irmatov (Uzbekistan)
Abdullah Al-Shalawi (Saudi Arabia)
Assistant video assistant referee:
Jair Marrufo (United States)

=== Germany vs Mexico ===
29 June 2017
21:00

| Germany | 4–1 | Mexico |
|---|---|---|
| Goretzka 6', 8'; Werner 59'; Younes 90+1' | Report | Fabián 89' |

Fisht Olympic Stadium, Sochi
Attendance: 37,923
Referee: Néstor Pitana (Argentina)

| Germany | Mexico |

| GK | 22 | Marc-André ter Stegen |
| CB | 18 | Joshua Kimmich |
| CB | 4 | Matthias Ginter |
| CB | 16 | Antonio Rüdiger |
| RM | 6 | Benjamin Henrichs |
| CM | 8 | Leon Goretzka | | (substituted off) 67' |
| CM | 21 | Sebastian Rudy |
| LM | 3 | Jonas Hector |
| RW | 13 | Lars Stindl | | (substituted off) 78' |
| LW | 7 | Julian Draxler (c) | | (substituted off) 81' |
| CF | 11 | Timo Werner |
Substitutions:
| MF | 14 | Emre Can | (yellow card) 72' | (substituted on) 67' |
| MF | 20 | Julian Brandt | | (substituted on) 78' |
| MF | 15 | Amin Younes | | (substituted on) 81' |
Manager:
Joachim Löw

| GK | 13 | Guillermo Ochoa |
| RB | 7 | Miguel Layún |
| CB | 2 | Néstor Araujo |
| CB | 15 | Héctor Moreno (c) |
| LB | 23 | Oswaldo Alanís |
| CM | 6 | Jonathan dos Santos | | (substituted off) 66' |
| CM | 16 | Héctor Herrera |
| CM | 10 | Giovani dos Santos | | (substituted off) 62' |
| RF | 9 | Raúl Jiménez | (yellow card) 55' |
| CF | 14 | Javier Hernández |
| LF | 20 | Javier Aquino | | (substituted off) 46' |
Substitutions:
| FW | 22 | Hirving Lozano | | (substituted on) 46' |
| FW | 8 | Marco Fabián | | (substituted on) 62' |
| DF | 4 | Rafael Márquez | | (substituted on) 66' |
Manager:
(Colombia) Juan Carlos Osorio

Man of the Match:
Leon Goretzka (Germany)

Assistant referees:
Hernán Maidana (Argentina)
Juan Pablo Belatti (Argentina)
Fourth official:
Gianluca Rocchi (Italy)
Video assistant referees:
Sandro Ricci (Brazil)
Elenito Di Liberatore (Italy)
Assistant video assistant referee:
Artur Soares Dias (Portugal)

== Third place play-off ==
2 July 2017
15:00

| Portugal | 2–1 (a.e.t.) | Mexico |
|---|---|---|
| Pepe 90+1'; Adrien 104' (pen.) | Report | Neto 54' (o.g.) |

Otkritie Arena, Moscow
Attendance: 42,659
Referee: Fahad Al-Mirdasi (Saudi Arabia)

| Portugal | Mexico |

| GK | 1 | Rui Patrício |
| RB | 11 | Nélson Semedo | (yellow card) 26' (yellow-red card) 106' |
| CB | 3 | Pepe |
| CB | 4 | Luís Neto |
| LB | 19 | Eliseu |
| RM | 18 | Gelson Martins |
| CM | 8 | João Moutinho | | (substituted off) 82' |
| CM | 13 | Danilo Pereira | | (substituted off) 82' |
| LM | 16 | Pizzi | | (substituted off) 91' |
| CF | 9 | André Silva |
| CF | 17 | Nani (c) | | (substituted off) 70' |
Substitutions:
| FW | 20 | Ricardo Quaresma | | (substituted on) 70' |
| MF | 23 | Adrien Silva | | (substituted on) 82' |
| MF | 15 | André Gomes | | (substituted on) 82' |
| MF | 14 | William Carvalho | | (substituted on) 91' |
Manager:
Fernando Santos

| GK | 13 | Guillermo Ochoa |
| RB | 7 | Miguel Layún |
| CB | 2 | Néstor Araujo |
| CB | 15 | Héctor Moreno | (yellow card) 98' |
| LB | 21 | Luis Reyes |
| CM | 16 | Héctor Herrera |
| CM | 4 | Rafael Márquez (c) | (yellow card) 15' | (substituted off) 106' |
| CM | 18 | Andrés Guardado | | (substituted off) 80' |
| RF | 11 | Carlos Vela |
| CF | 19 | Oribe Peralta | | (substituted off) 61' |
| LF | 14 | Javier Hernández | | (substituted off) 85' |
Substitutions:
| FW | 22 | Hirving Lozano | | (substituted on) 61' |
| MF | 6 | Jonathan dos Santos | | (substituted on) 80' |
| FW | 9 | Raúl Jiménez | (yellow card) 94' (yellow-red card) 112' | (substituted on) 85' |
| FW | 8 | Marco Fabián | | (substituted on) 106' |
Manager:
(Colombia) Juan Carlos Osorio (Note: Osorio was expelled by the referee in the 120th minute.)

Man of the Match:
Guillermo Ochoa (Mexico)

Assistant referees:
Abdullah Al-Shalawi (Saudi Arabia)
Mohammed Al-Abakry (Saudi Arabia)
Fourth official:
Bakary Gassama (Gambia)
Video assistant referees:
Sandro Ricci (Brazil)
Jean-Claude Birumushahu (Burundi)
Assistant video assistant referee:
Enrique Cáceres (Paraguay)

== Final ==
2 July 2017
21:00

| Chile | 0–1 | Germany |
|---|---|---|
| | Report | Stindl 20' |

Krestovsky Stadium, Saint Petersburg
Attendance: 57,268
Referee: Milorad Mažić (Serbia)

| Chile | Germany |

| GK | 1 | Claudio Bravo (c) | (yellow card) 90' |
| RB | 4 | Mauricio Isla |
| CB | 17 | Gary Medel |
| CB | 18 | Gonzalo Jara | (yellow card) 65' |
| LB | 15 | Jean Beausejour |
| DM | 21 | Marcelo Díaz | | (substituted off) 53' |
| CM | 20 | Charles Aránguiz | | (substituted off) 81' |
| CM | 10 | Pablo Hernández |
| AM | 8 | Arturo Vidal | (yellow card) 59' |
| CF | 11 | Eduardo Vargas | (yellow card) 75' | (substituted off) 81' |
| CF | 7 | Alexis Sánchez |
Substitutions:
| FW | 19 | Leonardo Valencia | | (substituted on) 53' |
| FW | 9 | Ángelo Sagal | | (substituted on) 81' |
| FW | 22 | Edson Puch | | (substituted on) 81' |
Manager:
(Spain) Juan Antonio Pizzi

| GK | 22 | Marc-André ter Stegen |
| CB | 4 | Matthias Ginter |
| CB | 16 | Antonio Rüdiger |
| CB | 2 | Shkodran Mustafi |
| RM | 18 | Joshua Kimmich | (yellow card) 59' |
| CM | 8 | Leon Goretzka | | (substituted off) 90+2' |
| CM | 21 | Sebastian Rudy | (yellow card) 90+2' |
| LM | 3 | Jonas Hector |
| RW | 13 | Lars Stindl |
| LW | 7 | Julian Draxler (c) |
| CF | 11 | Timo Werner | | (substituted off) 79' |
Substitutions:
| MF | 14 | Emre Can | (yellow card) 90' | (substituted on) 79' |
| DF | 17 | Niklas Süle | | (substituted on) 90+2' |
Manager:
Joachim Löw

Man of the Match:
Marc-André ter Stegen (Germany)

Assistant referees:
Milovan Ristić (Serbia)
Dalibor Đurđević (Serbia)
Fourth official:
Damir Skomina (Slovenia)
Video assistant referees:
Clément Turpin (France)
Jure Praprotnik (Slovenia)
Assistant video assistant referee:
Artur Soares Dias (Portugal)
