= 2017 FIFA Confederations Cup Group B =

Football tournament group stage

Group B of the 2017 FIFA Confederations Cup took place from 18 to 25 June 2017. It consisted of Cameroon, Chile, Australia, and Germany. The top two teams, Germany and Chile, advanced to the semi-finals. Australia and Cameroon were eliminated.

== Teams ==
Draw position	Team	Confederation	Method of qualification	Date of qualification	Finals appearance	Last appearance	Previous best performance	FIFA Rankings	
Draw position	Team	Confederation	Method of qualification	Date of qualification	Finals appearance	Last appearance	Previous best performance	November 2016 (Note: The rankings of November 2016 were used for seeding for the final draw.)	June 2017
B1	Cameroon	CAF	2017 Africa Cup of Nations winners	5 February 2017	3rd	2003	Runners-up (2003)	65	32
B2	Chile	CONMEBOL	2015 Copa América winners	4 July 2015	1st	—	Debut	4	4
B3	Australia	AFC	2015 AFC Asian Cup winners	31 January 2015	4th	2005	Runners-up (1997)	48	48
B4	Germany	UEFA	2014 FIFA World Cup winners	13 July 2014	3rd	2005	Third place (2005)	3	3

== Standings ==
Pos	Team	Pld	W	D	L	GF	GA	GD	Pts	Qualification
1	Germany	3	2	1	0	7	4	+3	7	Advance to knockout stage
2	Chile	3	1	2	0	4	2	+2	5	Advance to knockout stage
3	Australia	3	0	2	1	4	5	−1	2	
4	Cameroon	3	0	1	2	2	6	−4	1	

Source: FIFA
Rules for classification: Group stage tiebreakers

In the semi-finals:

- The winners of Group B, Germany, advances to play the runners-up of Group A, Mexico.
- The runners-up of Group B, Chile, advances to play the winners of Group A, Portugal.

== Matches ==
All times Moscow Time (UTC+3).

=== Cameroon vs Chile ===
18 June 2017
21:00

Cameroon	0–2	Chile
	Report	Vidal 81'; Vargas 90+1'

Otkritie Arena, Moscow
Attendance: 33,492
Referee: Damir Skomina (Slovenia)

Cameroon	Chile

GK	1	Fabrice Ondoa
RB	2	Ernest Mabouka
CB	5	Michael Ngadeu-Ngadjui
CB	4	Adolphe Teikeu
LB	19	Collins Fai
CM	15	Sébastien Siani	(substituted off) 86'
CM	3	André-Frank Zambo Anguissa	(substituted off) 89'
CM	17	Arnaud Djoum
RF	13	Christian Bassogog
CF	10	Vincent Aboubakar
LF	8	Benjamin Moukandjo (c)
Substitutions:
FW	7	Moumi Ngamaleu	(substituted on) 73'
MF	14	Georges Mandjeck	(substituted on) 89'
Manager:
(Belgium) Hugo Broos

GK	23	Johnny Herrera
RB	4	Mauricio Isla
CB	17	Gary Medel (c)
CB	18	Gonzalo Jara	(yellow card) 66'
LB	15	Jean Beausejour
CM	8	Arturo Vidal
CM	21	Marcelo Díaz
CM	20	Charles Aránguiz		(substituted off) 71'
RF	6	José Pedro Fuenzalida		(substituted off) 64'
CF	11	Eduardo Vargas
LF	22	Edson Puch		(substituted off) 58'
Substitutions:
FW	7	Alexis Sánchez		(substituted on) 58'
FW	19	Leonardo Valencia		(substituted on) 64'
MF	5	Francisco Silva		(substituted on) 71'
Manager:
(Spain) Juan Antonio Pizzi

Man of the Match:
Arturo Vidal (Chile)

Assistant referees:
Jure Praprotnik (Slovenia)
Robert Vukan (Slovenia)
Fourth official:
Milorad Mažić (Serbia)
Video assistant referees:
Clément Turpin (France)
Milovan Ristić (Serbia)
Assistant video assistant referee:
Malang Diedhiou (Senegal)

=== Australia vs Germany ===
19 June 2017
18:00

Australia	2–3	Germany
Rogic 41'; Juric 56'	Report	Stindl 5'; Draxler 44' (pen.); Goretzka 48'

Fisht Olympic Stadium, Sochi
Attendance: 28,605
Referee: Mark Geiger (United States)

Australia	Germany

GK	1	Mathew Ryan
CB	8	Bailey Wright
CB	20	Trent Sainsbury	(yellow card) 64'
CB	2	Miloš Degenek
DM	5	Mark Milligan (c)
DM	13	Aaron Mooy
RM	7	Mathew Leckie
LM	16	Aziz Behich
RF	21	Massimo Luongo		(substituted off) 46'
CF	9	Tomi Juric		(substituted off) 86'
LF	23	Tom Rogic		(substituted off) 71'
Substitutions:
FW	10	Robbie Kruse		(substituted on) 46'
FW	14	James Troisi		(substituted on) 71'
FW	4	Tim Cahill		(substituted on) 86'
Manager:
Ange Postecoglou

GK	12	Bernd Leno
RB	18	Joshua Kimmich
CB	16	Antonio Rüdiger
CB	2	Shkodran Mustafi
LB	3	Jonas Hector
DM	21	Sebastian Rudy
RM	20	Julian Brandt		(substituted off) 63'
CM	13	Lars Stindl		(substituted off) 78'
CM	8	Leon Goretzka	(yellow card) 55'
LM	7	Julian Draxler (c)
CF	9	Sandro Wagner		(substituted off) 57'
Substitutions:
FW	11	Timo Werner		(substituted on) 57'
DF	17	Niklas Süle		(substituted on) 63'
MF	14	Emre Can		(substituted on) 78'
Manager:
Joachim Löw

Man of the Match:
Julian Draxler (Germany)

Assistant referees:
Joe Fletcher (Canada)
Charles Justin Morgante (United States)
Fourth official:
Wilmar Roldán (Colombia)
Video assistant referees:
Ravshan Irmatov (Uzbekistan)
Alexander Guzman (Colombia)
Assistant video assistant referee:
Artur Soares Dias (Portugal)

=== Cameroon vs Australia ===
22 June 2017
18:00

Cameroon	1–1	Australia
Zambo Anguissa 45+1'	Report	Milligan 60' (pen.)

Krestovsky Stadium, Saint Petersburg
Attendance: 35,021
Referee: Milorad Mažić (Serbia)

Cameroon	Australia

GK	1	Fabrice Ondoa
RB	2	Ernest Mabouka	(yellow card) 90+1'
CB	5	Michael Ngadeu-Ngadjui
CB	4	Adolphe Teikeu
LB	19	Collins Fai
CM	15	Sébastien Siani	(yellow card) 87'
CM	3	André-Frank Zambo Anguissa
CM	17	Arnaud Djoum
RF	13	Christian Bassogog
CF	10	Vincent Aboubakar
LF	8	Benjamin Moukandjo (c)		(substituted off) 77'
Substitutions:
FW	20	Karl Toko Ekambi		(substituted on) 77'
Manager:
(Belgium) Hugo Broos

GK	1	Mathew Ryan
CB	8	Bailey Wright	(yellow card) 81'
CB	20	Trent Sainsbury
CB	2	Miloš Degenek
RM	7	Mathew Leckie
CM	13	Aaron Mooy
CM	5	Mark Milligan (c)
LM	3	Alex Gersbach
RW	23	Tom Rogic		(substituted off) 79'
LW	10	Robbie Kruse		(substituted off) 65'
CF	9	Tomi Juric		(substituted off) 70'
Substitutions:
FW	14	James Troisi		(substituted on) 65'
FW	4	Tim Cahill		(substituted on) 70'
MF	22	Jackson Irvine		(substituted on) 79'
Manager:
Ange Postecoglou

Man of the Match:
André-Frank Zambo Anguissa (Cameroon)

Assistant referees:
Milovan Ristić (Serbia)
Dalibor Đurđević (Serbia)
Fourth official:
Néstor Pitana (Argentina)
Video assistant referees:
Jair Marrufo (United States)
Hernán Maidana (Argentina)
Assistant video assistant referee:
Enrique Cáceres (Paraguay)

=== Germany vs Chile ===
22 June 2017
21:00

Germany	1–1	Chile
Stindl 41'	Report	Sánchez 6'

Kazan Arena, Kazan
Attendance: 38,222
Referee: Alireza Faghani (Iran)

Germany	Chile

GK	22	Marc-André ter Stegen
CB	4	Matthias Ginter
CB	2	Shkodran Mustafi
CB	17	Niklas Süle
RM	18	Joshua Kimmich
CM	14	Emre Can
CM	21	Sebastian Rudy	(yellow card) 60'
LM	3	Jonas Hector
RW	8	Leon Goretzka
LW	7	Julian Draxler (c)
CF	13	Lars Stindl	(yellow card) 20'
Manager:
Joachim Löw

GK	23	Johnny Herrera
RB	4	Mauricio Isla
CB	17	Gary Medel (c)		(substituted off) 71'
CB	18	Gonzalo Jara
LB	15	Jean Beausejour	(yellow card) 80'
DM	21	Marcelo Díaz
CM	20	Charles Aránguiz		(substituted off) 90'
CM	10	Pablo Hernández
AM	8	Arturo Vidal
CF	11	Eduardo Vargas		(substituted off) 82'
CF	7	Alexis Sánchez	(yellow card) 64'
Substitutions:
DF	13	Paulo Díaz		(substituted on) 71'
FW	16	Martín Rodríguez		(substituted on) 82'
MF	5	Francisco Silva		(substituted on) 90'
Manager:
(Spain) Juan Antonio Pizzi

Man of the Match:
Alexis Sánchez (Chile)

Assistant referees:
Reza Sokhandan (Iran)
Mohammadreza Mansouri (Iran)
Fourth official:
Mark Geiger (United States)
Video assistant referees:
Artur Soares Dias (Portugal)
Joe Fletcher (Canada)
Assistant video assistant referee:
Ravshan Irmatov (Uzbekistan)

=== Germany vs Cameroon ===
25 June 2017
18:00

Germany	3–1	Cameroon
Demirbay 48'; Werner 66', 81'	Report	Aboubakar 78'

Fisht Olympic Stadium, Sochi
Attendance: 30,230
Referee: Wilmar Roldán (Colombia)

Germany	Cameroon

GK	22	Marc-André ter Stegen
CB	4	Matthias Ginter
CB	16	Antonio Rüdiger
CB	17	Niklas Süle
RM	18	Joshua Kimmich
CM	14	Emre Can
CM	21	Sebastian Rudy		(substituted off) 74'
LM	5	Marvin Plattenhardt	(yellow card) 90+2'
RW	10	Kerem Demirbay		(substituted off) 77'
LW	7	Julian Draxler (c)		(substituted off) 80'
CF	11	Timo Werner
Substitutions:
DF	6	Benjamin Henrichs		(substituted on) 74'
MF	20	Julian Brandt		(substituted on) 77'
MF	15	Amin Younes		(substituted on) 80'
Manager:
Joachim Löw

GK	1	Fabrice Ondoa
RB	2	Ernest Mabouka	(red card) 64'
CB	5	Michael Ngadeu-Ngadjui
CB	4	Adolphe Teikeu
LB	19	Collins Fai
CM	15	Sébastien Siani
CM	3	André-Frank Zambo Anguissa
CM	17	Arnaud Djoum		(substituted off) 58'
RF	13	Christian Bassogog		(substituted off) 82'
CF	10	Vincent Aboubakar
LF	8	Benjamin Moukandjo (c)		(substituted off) 70'
Substitutions:
FW	7	Moumi Ngamaleu		(substituted on) 58'
DF	12	Jérôme Guihoata		(substituted on) 70'
FW	20	Karl Toko Ekambi		(substituted on) 82'
Manager:
(Belgium) Hugo Broos

Man of the Match:
Timo Werner (Germany)

Assistant referees:
Alexander Guzman (Colombia)
Cristian De La Cruz (Colombia)
Fourth official:
Néstor Pitana (Argentina)
Video assistant referees:
Artur Soares Dias (Portugal)
Hernán Maidana (Argentina)
Assistant video assistant referee:
Enrique Cáceres (Paraguay)

=== Chile vs Australia ===
25 June 2017
18:00

Chile	1–1	Australia
Rodríguez 67'	Report	Troisi 42'

Otkritie Arena, Moscow
Attendance: 33,639
Referee: Gianluca Rocchi (Italy)

Chile	Australia

GK	1	Claudio Bravo (c)
RB	4	Mauricio Isla
CB	13	Paulo Díaz
CB	18	Gonzalo Jara
LB	2	Eugenio Mena
CM	8	Arturo Vidal	(yellow card) 57'
CM	5	Francisco Silva
CM	20	Charles Aránguiz		(substituted off) 46'
RF	6	José Pedro Fuenzalida		(substituted off) 46'
CF	11	Eduardo Vargas		(substituted off) 82'
LF	7	Alexis Sánchez
Substitutions:
FW	16	Martín Rodríguez		(substituted on) 46'
MF	10	Pablo Hernández	(yellow card) 75'	(substituted on) 46'
MF	21	Marcelo Díaz		(substituted on) 82'
Manager:
(Spain) Juan Antonio Pizzi

GK	1	Mathew Ryan
CB	19	Ryan McGowan
CB	20	Trent Sainsbury		(substituted off) 72'
CB	5	Mark Milligan
RM	10	Robbie Kruse
CM	22	Jackson Irvine
CM	21	Massimo Luongo	(yellow card) 21'
LM	16	Aziz Behich	(yellow card) 45+1'
RF	4	Tim Cahill (c)	(yellow card) 33'	(substituted off) 57'
CF	9	Tomi Juric		(substituted off) 62'
LF	14	James Troisi	(yellow card) 31'
Substitutions:
FW	7	Mathew Leckie		(substituted on) 57'
FW	11	Jamie Maclaren		(substituted on) 62'
DF	8	Bailey Wright		(substituted on) 72'
Manager:
Ange Postecoglou

Man of the Match:
James Troisi (Australia)

Assistant referees:
Elenito Di Liberatore (Italy)
Mauro Tonolini (Italy)
Fourth official:
Milorad Mažić (Serbia)
Video assistant referees:
Ovidiu Hațegan (Romania)
Milovan Ristić (Serbia)
Assistant video assistant referee:
Clément Turpin (France)
