= 2017 FIFA Confederations Cup final =

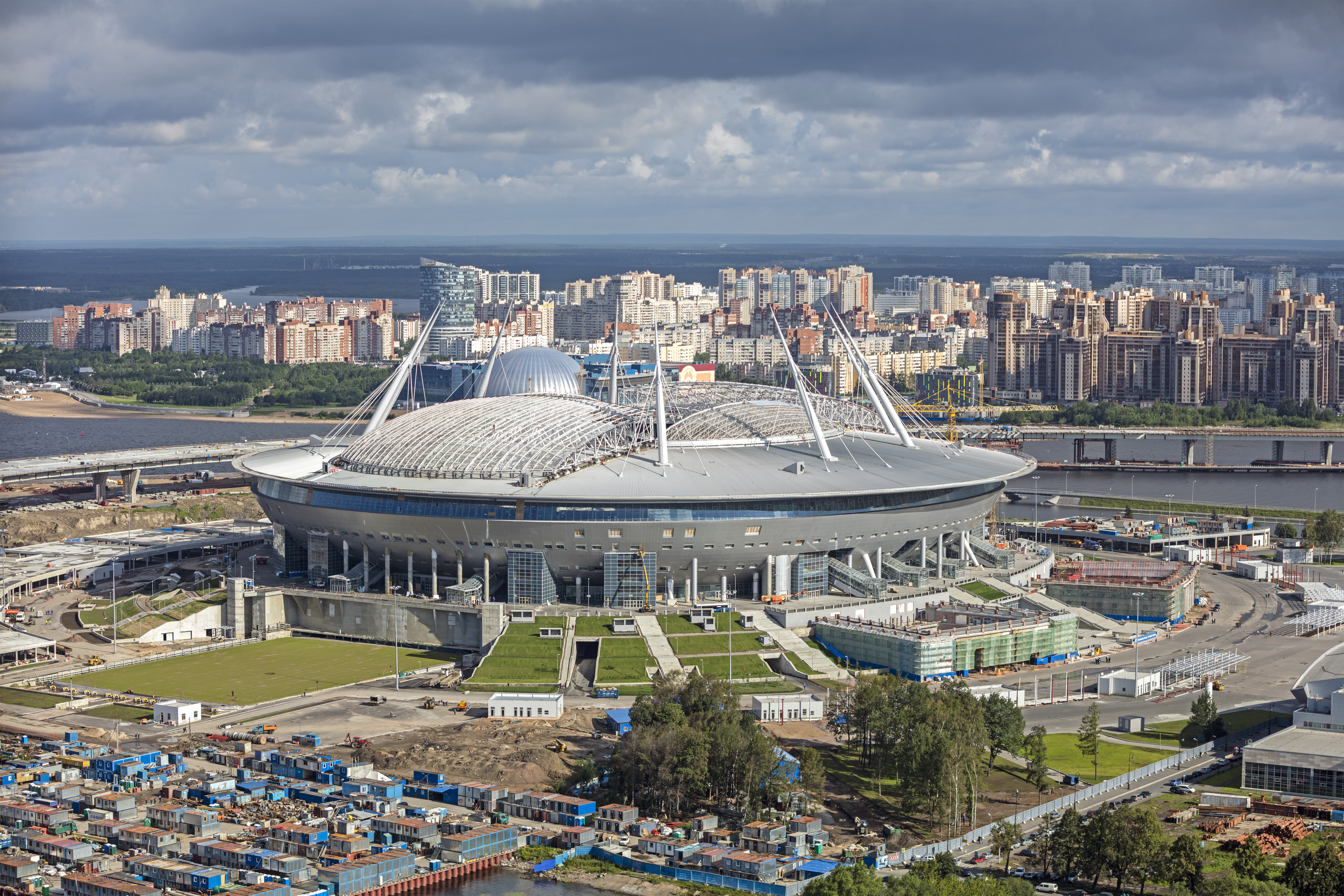
- The Krestovsky Stadium hosted the final.
- Event: 2017 FIFA Confederations Cup
Chile	Germany
(Chile)	(Germany)
0	1
- Date: 2 July 2017
- Venue: Krestovsky Stadium, Saint Petersburg
- Man of the Match: Marc-André ter Stegen (Germany)
- Referee: Milorad Mažić (Serbia)
- Attendance: 57,268
- Weather: Partly cloudy 19 °C (66 °F); 55% humidity

The 2017 FIFA Confederations Cup final was a football match to determine the winners of the 2017 FIFA Confederations Cup, the 10th and last edition of the FIFA Confederations Cup, a quadrennial international men's football tournament organised by FIFA. The match was held at the Krestovsky Stadium in Saint Petersburg, Russia, on 2 July 2017, and was contested by the winners of the semi-finals, Chile and Germany.

Germany won the final 1–0 via a 20th-minute goal from Lars Stindl to claim their first and only FIFA Confederations Cup title. It was the last FIFA Confederations Cup match.

== Background ==
The match was Chile's first Confederations Cup final in their inaugural participation in the tournament, having qualified by winning the Copa América in 2015 for the very first time. For Chile, this was also their first ever final in a FIFA-sanctioned competition. This achievement meant Chile is the fifth South American country, after Argentina, Brazil, Uruguay and Venezuela, to have reached the final of any FIFA competitions.

The match was also Germany's first Confederations Cup final, having qualified for the tournament by winning the FIFA World Cup in 2014 for their fourth title. The tournament was their third appearance in the Confederations Cup. In 1999, Germany qualified by winning UEFA Euro 1996, and finished third in their group. In 2005, Germany qualified as hosts, and finished third in the tournament. Germany were also invited to the tournament in 1992 as 1990 FIFA World Cup winners, in 1997 as UEFA Euro 1996 winners, and in 2003 as 2002 FIFA World Cup runners-up, but declined to participate on all occasions.

Chile and Germany had faced each other on eight occasions prior, four of which were friendlies and four of which were competitive matches. Germany had won a total of five matches, with Chile winning two, and one match finishing as a draw. Of the competitive matches between them, Germany remained undefeated with a record of three wins and one draw. West Germany won the first meeting 2–1 in a 1960 friendly. A year later in 1961, Chile won 3–1 in another friendly. The sides faced each other competitively for the first time another year later at the 1962 FIFA World Cup, which Chile hosted, with West Germany winning 2–0 in the group stage. The sides met again in a friendly in 1968, with Chile winning 2–1. At the 1974 FIFA World Cup, hosts West Germany beat Chile 1–0 in the first round. They met again at the 1982 FIFA World Cup, with West Germany winning the first round match 4–1. After 32 years, the two faced each other again in a friendly, with Germany winning 1–0. Their latest meeting took place in the group stage of the tournament, finishing 1–1, the first draw between the two sides.

For the third time, teams from the same group faced again in the final, previously occurring in 1997 (Brazil and Australia) and 2009 (United States and Brazil). The final was a record-equalling fourth consecutive with a South American country, and a record-equalling second consecutive with a European country. This was the eighth time a South American country had made the final, including an all-South American final in 2005 between rivals Argentina and Brazil. On the other six occasions, the South American team won four times (Argentina in 1992, Brazil in 1997, 2009, and 2013), and lost twice (Argentina in 1995, Brazil in 1999). This was the fifth time a European country had made the final, with three wins (Denmark in 1995, France in 2001 and 2003), and one loss (Spain in 2013). This was the third final between a South American and European country, with both continents having one win each. The South American country, Brazil, defeated Spain in 2013, and the European country, Denmark, defeated Argentina in 1995.

For the first time since 2003, a different champion was to be declared, as Brazil, the defending champions who won the last three editions, failed to qualify (for the first time since 1995) following their loss on penalties to Paraguay in the quarter-finals of the 2015 Copa América. For the first time since France in 2001, a new country would win the competition, which would be the sixth overall winner. A total of two South American teams (Argentina and Brazil) and two European countries (Denmark and France) had previously won the Confederations Cup. If Chile were to have won, they would extend South America's record number of consecutive finals won to four, and overall finals won to six. If Germany were to have won, they would extend Europe's number of finals won to four, ranking second only behind South America's five wins.

== Route to the final ==
Chile
Round
Germany
Opponents
Result
Group stage
Opponents
Result
Cameroon
2–0
Match 1
Australia
3–2
Germany
1–1
Match 2
Chile
1–1
Australia
1–1
Match 3
Cameroon
3–1
Group B runners-up

Pos	Team	Pld	Pts
1	Germany	3	7
2	Chile	3	5
3	Australia	3	2
4	Cameroon	3	1

Source: FIFA
Final standings
Group B winners

Pos	Team	Pld	Pts
1	Germany	3	7
2	Chile	3	5
3	Australia	3	2
4	Cameroon	3	1

Source: FIFA
Opponents
Result
Knockout stage
Opponents
Result
Portugal
0–0 (a.e.t.) (3–0 p)
Semi-finals
Mexico
4–1

== Match ==
=== Summary ===
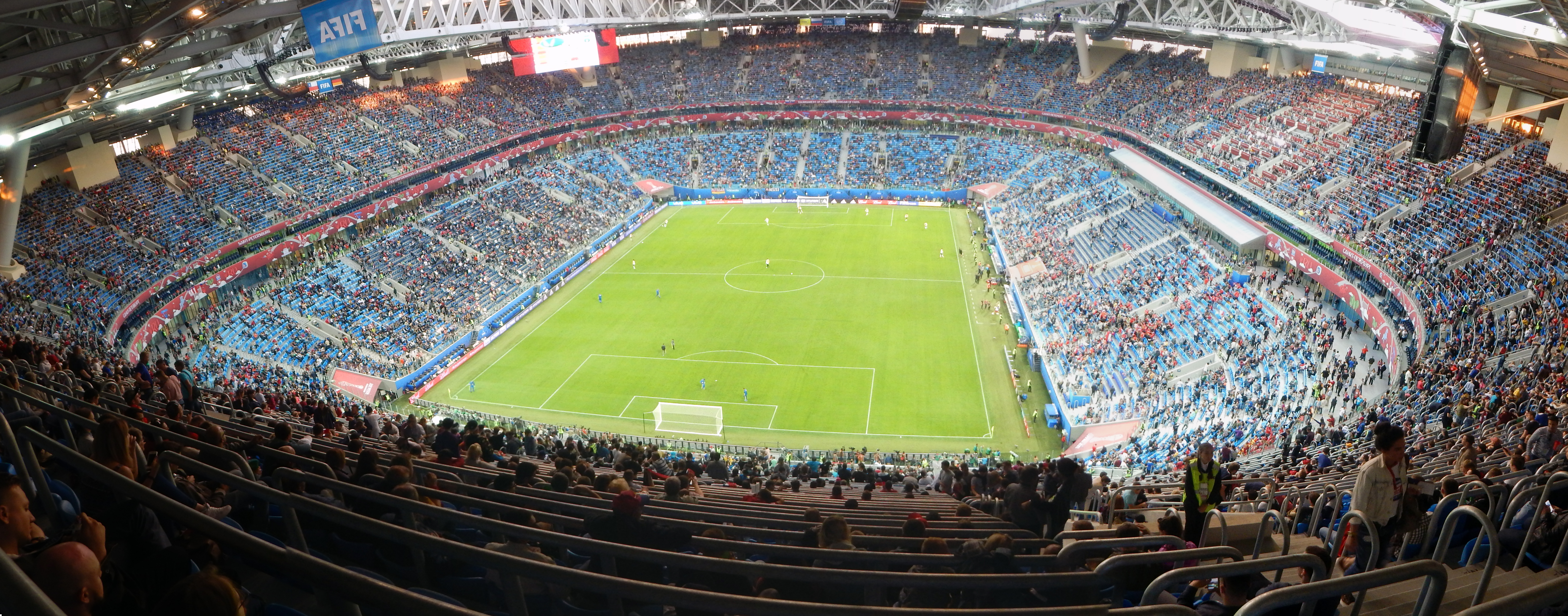
Panoramic view of the match from the stands

Chile started the final the better of the two sides, and had a clear goal scoring opportunity inside four minutes which was well saved by Marc-André ter Stegen from Arturo Vidal. Chile continued to pressure Germany with several goal attempts, including a wayward shot from Eduardo Vargas and a long range effort from Vidal which was also well saved by Ter Stegen. Germany would take the lead, against the run of play in the 20th minute when Timo Werner capitalized on a mistake by Marcelo Díaz, easily passing the ball to Lars Stindl for him to tap the ball into an empty net. The goal proved to be important as Germany gained confidence in attack, leading to efforts from Leon Goretzka and Julian Draxler going just wide of the goal. Just before half time, Germany had their best chance to double their lead as Draxler intercepted the ball from Gonzalo Jara, but after giving the ball to Goretzka his shot was well saved by Claudio Bravo.

The second half started with Germany continuing to attempt to double their lead, but towards the later parts of the second half Chile began to exert pressure on the German goal, leading to several missed chances. There was also a moment of controversy as Jara was judged to have elbowed Werner in the face, and VAR system had to be called into play. After review, the referee awarded Jara a yellow card for this action. Germany managed to hang on to their one-goal advantage to win the FIFA Confederations Cup for the first time in their history.

=== Details ===
2 July 2017
21:00 MSK

Chile	0–1	Germany
	Report	Stindl 20'

Krestovsky Stadium, Saint Petersburg
Attendance: 57,268
Referee: Milorad Mažić (Serbia)

Chile	Germany

GK	1	Claudio Bravo (c)	(yellow card) 90'
RB	4	Mauricio Isla
CB	17	Gary Medel
CB	18	Gonzalo Jara	(yellow card) 65'
LB	15	Jean Beausejour
DM	21	Marcelo Díaz		(substituted off) 53'
CM	20	Charles Aránguiz		(substituted off) 81'
CM	10	Pablo Hernández
AM	8	Arturo Vidal	(yellow card) 59'
CF	11	Eduardo Vargas	(yellow card) 75'	(substituted off) 81'
CF	7	Alexis Sánchez
Substitutions:
FW	19	Leonardo Valencia		(substituted on) 53'
FW	9	Ángelo Sagal		(substituted on) 81'
FW	22	Edson Puch		(substituted on) 81'
Manager:
(Spain) Juan Antonio Pizzi

GK	22	Marc-André ter Stegen
CB	4	Matthias Ginter
CB	16	Antonio Rüdiger
CB	2	Shkodran Mustafi
RM	18	Joshua Kimmich	(yellow card) 59'
CM	8	Leon Goretzka		(substituted off) 90+2'
CM	21	Sebastian Rudy	(yellow card) 90+2'
LM	3	Jonas Hector
RW	13	Lars Stindl
LW	7	Julian Draxler (c)
CF	11	Timo Werner		(substituted off) 79'
Substitutions:
MF	14	Emre Can	(yellow card) 90'	(substituted on) 79'
DF	17	Niklas Süle		(substituted on) 90+2'
Manager:
Joachim Löw

Man of the Match:
Marc-André ter Stegen (Germany)

Assistant referees:
Milovan Ristić (Serbia)
Dalibor Đurđević (Serbia)
Fourth official:
Damir Skomina (Slovenia)
Video assistant referees:
Clément Turpin (France)
Jure Praprotnik (Slovenia)
Assistant video assistant referee:
Artur Soares Dias (Portugal)

Match rules

- 90 minutes.
- 30 minutes of extra time if necessary.
- Penalty shoot-out if scores still level.
- Maximum of three substitutions, with a fourth allowed in extra time.

=== Statistics ===
First half
Statistic	Chile	Germany
Goals scored	0	1
Total shots	12	5
Shots on target	3	2
Saves	1	3
Ball possession	63%	37%
Corner kicks	3	3
Fouls committed	5	8
Offsides	3	2
Yellow cards	0	0
Red cards	0	0

Second half
Statistic	Chile	Germany
Goals scored	0	0
Total shots	9	3
Shots on target	5	1
Saves	1	5
Ball possession	59%	41%
Corner kicks	6	1
Fouls committed	8	12
Offsides	0	1
Yellow cards	4	3
Red cards	0	0

Overall
Statistic	Chile	Germany
Goals scored	0	1
Total shots	21	8
Shots on target	8	3
Saves	2	8
Ball possession	61%	39%
Corner kicks	9	4
Fouls committed	13	20
Offsides	3	3
Yellow cards	4	3
Red cards	0	0

== See also ==
- 2017 FIFA Confederations Cup knockout stage
- 2018 FIFA World Cup
