= 2017 FIFA Confederations Cup Group A =

Football tournament group stage

Group A of the 2017 FIFA Confederations Cup took place from 17 to 24 June 2017. It consisted of Russia, New Zealand, Portugal, and Mexico. The top two teams, Portugal and Mexico, advanced to the semi-finals. Hosts Russia and New Zealand were eliminated.

== Teams ==
Draw position	Team	Confederation	Method of qualification	Date of qualification	Finals appearance	Last appearance	Previous best performance	FIFA Rankings	
Draw position	Team	Confederation	Method of qualification	Date of qualification	Finals appearance	Last appearance	Previous best performance	November 2016 (Note: The rankings of November 2016 were used for seeding for the final draw.)	June 2017
A1	Russia	UEFA	Hosts	2 December 2010	1st	—	Debut	55	63
A2	New Zealand	OFC	2016 OFC Nations Cup winners	11 June 2016	4th	2009	Group stage (1999, 2003, 2009)	110	95
A3	Portugal	UEFA	UEFA Euro 2016 winners	10 July 2016	1st	—	Debut	8	8
A4	Mexico	CONCACAF	2015 CONCACAF Cup winners	10 October 2015	7th	2013	Winners (1999)	18	17

== Standings ==
Pos	Team	Pld	W	D	L	GF	GA	GD	Pts	Qualification
1	Portugal	3	2	1	0	7	2	+5	7	Advance to knockout stage
2	Mexico	3	2	1	0	6	4	+2	7	Advance to knockout stage
3	Russia (H)	3	1	0	2	3	3	0	3	
4	New Zealand	3	0	0	3	1	8	−7	0	

Source: FIFA
Rules for classification: Group stage tiebreakers
(H) Hosts

In the semi-finals:

- The winners of Group A, Portugal, advanced to play the runners-up of Group B, Chile.
- The runners-up of Group A, Mexico, advanced to play the winners of Group B, Germany.

== Matches ==
All times Moscow Time (UTC+3).

=== Russia vs New Zealand ===
17 June 2017
18:00

Russia	2–0	New Zealand
Boxall 31' (o.g.); Smolov 69'	Report

Krestovsky Stadium, Saint Petersburg
Attendance: 50,251
Referee: Wilmar Roldán (Colombia)

Russia	New Zealand

GK	1	Igor Akinfeev (c)
CB	6	Georgi Dzhikiya
CB	5	Viktor Vasin
CB	13	Fyodor Kudryashov
RWB	19	Aleksandr Samedov
LWB	18	Yuri Zhirkov
CM	21	Aleksandr Yerokhin	(substituted off) 77'
CM	8	Denis Glushakov
CM	17	Aleksandr Golovin
CF	9	Fyodor Smolov	(substituted off) 90'
CF	7	Dmitry Poloz	(substituted off) 64'
Substitutions:
FW	11	Aleksandr Bukharov	(substituted on) 64'
MF	22	Dmitri Tarasov	(substituted on) 77'
MF	15	Aleksei Miranchuk	(substituted on) 90'
Manager:
Stanislav Cherchesov

GK	1	Stefan Marinovic
CB	20	Tommy Smith
CB	22	Andrew Durante
CB	5	Michael Boxall
RWB	18	Kip Colvey	(substituted off) 83'
LWB	3	Deklan Wynne
CM	7	Kosta Barbarouses	(substituted off) 61'
CM	8	Michael McGlinchey
CM	14	Ryan Thomas
CF	11	Marco Rojas	(substituted off) 71'
CF	9	Chris Wood (c)
Substitutions:
MF	6	Bill Tuiloma	(substituted on) 61'
FW	10	Shane Smeltz	(substituted on) 71'
FW	13	Monty Patterson	(substituted on) 83'
Manager:
(England) Anthony Hudson

Man of the Match:
Fyodor Smolov (Russia)

Assistant referees:
Alexander Guzman (Colombia)
Cristian De La Cruz (Colombia)
Fourth official:
Mark Geiger (United States)
Video assistant referees:
Sandro Ricci (Brazil)
Joe Fletcher (Canada)
Assistant video assistant referee:
Enrique Cáceres (Paraguay)

=== Portugal vs Mexico ===
18 June 2017
18:00

Portugal	2–2	Mexico
Quaresma 34'; Cédric 86'	Report	Hernández 42'; Moreno 90+1'

Kazan Arena, Kazan
Attendance: 34,372
Referee: Néstor Pitana (Argentina)

Portugal	Mexico

GK	1	Rui Patrício
RB	21	Cédric
CB	3	Pepe
CB	6	José Fonte
LB	5	Raphaël Guerreiro
RM	20	Ricardo Quaresma		(substituted off) 82'
CM	14	William Carvalho
CM	8	João Moutinho		(substituted off) 58'
LM	15	André Gomes	(yellow card) 90+3'
CF	17	Nani		(substituted off) 58'
CF	7	Cristiano Ronaldo (c)
Substitutions:
FW	18	Gelson Martins		(substituted on) 58'
MF	23	Adrien Silva	(yellow card) 68'	(substituted on) 58'
FW	9	André Silva		(substituted on) 82'
Manager:
Fernando Santos

GK	13	Guillermo Ochoa
RB	3	Carlos Salcedo		(substituted off) 67'
CB	5	Diego Reyes
CB	15	Héctor Moreno
LB	7	Miguel Layún
CM	6	Jonathan dos Santos
CM	16	Héctor Herrera
CM	18	Andrés Guardado (c)	(yellow card) 73'
RF	11	Carlos Vela		(substituted off) 57'
CF	14	Javier Hernández
LF	9	Raúl Jiménez		(substituted off) 79'
Substitutions:
MF	10	Giovani dos Santos		(substituted on) 57'
DF	2	Néstor Araujo		(substituted on) 67'
FW	19	Oribe Peralta		(substituted on) 79'
Manager:
(Colombia) Juan Carlos Osorio

Man of the Match:
Cristiano Ronaldo (Portugal)

Assistant referees:
Hernán Maidana (Argentina)
Juan Pablo Belatti (Argentina)
Fourth official:
Abdelkader Zitouni (Tahiti)
Video assistant referees:
Jair Marrufo (United States)
Dalibor Đurđević (Serbia)
Assistant video assistant referee:
Ovidiu Hațegan (Romania)

=== Russia vs Portugal ===
21 June 2017
18:00

Russia	0–1	Portugal
	Report	Ronaldo 8'

Otkritie Arena, Moscow
Attendance: 42,759
Referee: Gianluca Rocchi (Italy)

Russia	Portugal

GK	1	Igor Akinfeev (c)
CB	6	Georgi Dzhikiya	(yellow card) 72'
CB	5	Viktor Vasin
CB	13	Fyodor Kudryashov		(substituted off) 83'
RWB	3	Roman Shishkin		(substituted off) 46'
LWB	23	Dmitri Kombarov		(substituted off) 68'
RM	19	Aleksandr Samedov	(yellow card) 76'
CM	8	Denis Glushakov	(yellow card) 26'
CM	17	Aleksandr Golovin
LM	18	Yuri Zhirkov
CF	9	Fyodor Smolov
Substitutions:
MF	21	Aleksandr Yerokhin		(substituted on) 46'
FW	7	Dmitry Poloz		(substituted on) 68'
FW	11	Aleksandr Bukharov		(substituted on) 83'
Manager:
Stanislav Cherchesov

GK	1	Rui Patrício
RB	5	Raphaël Guerreiro		(substituted off) 65'
CB	3	Pepe	(yellow card) 57'
CB	2	Bruno Alves
LB	21	Cédric
RM	10	Bernardo Silva	(yellow card) 71'
CM	14	William Carvalho
CM	23	Adrien Silva		(substituted off) 83'
LM	15	André Gomes
CF	9	André Silva		(substituted off) 78'
CF	7	Cristiano Ronaldo (c)
Substitutions:
DF	19	Eliseu		(substituted on) 65'
FW	18	Gelson Martins		(substituted on) 78'
MF	13	Danilo Pereira		(substituted on) 83'
Manager:
Fernando Santos

Man of the Match:
Cristiano Ronaldo (Portugal)

Assistant referees:
Elenito Di Liberatore (Italy)
Mauro Tonolini (Italy)
Fourth official:
Damir Skomina (Slovenia)
Video assistant referees:
Sandro Ricci (Brazil)
Jure Praprotnik (Slovenia)
Assistant video assistant referee:
Ovidiu Hațegan (Romania)

=== Mexico vs New Zealand ===
21 June 2017
21:00

Mexico	2–1	New Zealand
Jiménez 54'; Peralta 72'	Report	Wood 42'

Fisht Olympic Stadium, Sochi
Attendance: 25,133
Referee: Bakary Gassama (Gambia)

Mexico	New Zealand

GK	12	Alfredo Talavera
CB	3	Carlos Salcedo		(substituted off) 33'
CB	2	Néstor Araujo
CB	23	Oswaldo Alanís		(substituted off) 46'
RM	10	Giovani dos Santos
CM	5	Diego Reyes (c)	(yellow card) 90+6'
CM	8	Marco Fabián
LM	20	Javier Aquino
RF	17	Jürgen Damm
CF	9	Raúl Jiménez
LF	19	Oribe Peralta
Substitutions:
DF	15	Héctor Moreno		(substituted on) 33'	(substituted off) 68'
MF	16	Héctor Herrera	(yellow card) 90+5'	(substituted on) 46'
DF	4	Rafael Márquez			(substituted on) 68'
Manager:
(Colombia) Juan Carlos Osorio

GK	1	Stefan Marinovic
CB	5	Michael Boxall	(yellow card) 90+6'
CB	22	Andrew Durante
CB	20	Tommy Smith
RWB	16	Dane Ingham		(substituted off) 82'
LWB	3	Deklan Wynne
CM	15	Clayton Lewis		(substituted off) 58'
CM	8	Michael McGlinchey
CM	14	Ryan Thomas	(yellow card) 26'
CF	11	Marco Rojas		(substituted off) 73'
CF	9	Chris Wood (c)
Substitutions:
MF	6	Bill Tuiloma		(substituted on) 58'
FW	7	Kosta Barbarouses		(substituted on) 73'
FW	13	Monty Patterson		(substituted on) 82'
Manager:
(England) Anthony Hudson

Man of the Match:
Javier Aquino (Mexico)

Assistant referees:
Jean-Claude Birumushahu (Burundi)
Marwa Range (Kenya)
Fourth official:
Abdelkader Zitouni (Tahiti)
Video assistant referees:
Clément Turpin (France)
Robert Vukan (Slovenia)
Assistant video assistant referee:
Malang Diedhiou (Senegal)

=== Mexico vs Russia ===
24 June 2017
18:00

Mexico	2–1	Russia
Araujo 30'; Lozano 52'	Report	Samedov 25'

Kazan Arena, Kazan
Attendance: 41,585
Referee: Fahad Al-Mirdasi (Saudi Arabia)

Mexico	Russia

GK	13	Guillermo Ochoa
RB	5	Diego Reyes		(substituted off) 39'
CB	2	Néstor Araujo
CB	15	Héctor Moreno
LB	7	Miguel Layún
CM	6	Jonathan dos Santos
CM	16	Héctor Herrera
CM	18	Andrés Guardado (c)	(yellow card) 16'	(substituted off) 70'
RF	22	Hirving Lozano
CF	14	Javier Hernández
LF	11	Carlos Vela		(substituted off) 46'
Substitutions:
DF	21	Luis Reyes		(substituted on) 39'
MF	20	Javier Aquino		(substituted on) 46'
MF	23	Oswaldo Alanís	(yellow card) 90+2'	(substituted on) 70'
Manager:
(Colombia) Juan Carlos Osorio

GK	1	Igor Akinfeev (c)
CB	6	Georgi Dzhikiya
CB	5	Viktor Vasin	(yellow card) 71'
CB	13	Fyodor Kudryashov	(yellow card) 63'
RWB	19	Aleksandr Samedov
LWB	18	Yuri Zhirkov	(yellow card) 9' (yellow-red card) 68'
CM	21	Aleksandr Yerokhin		(substituted off) 70'
CM	8	Denis Glushakov
CM	17	Aleksandr Golovin	(yellow card) 88'
CF	9	Fyodor Smolov		(substituted off) 78'
CF	11	Aleksandr Bukharov		(substituted off) 64'
Substitutions:
FW	7	Dmitry Poloz		(substituted on) 64'
DF	2	Igor Smolnikov		(substituted on) 70'
FW	20	Maksim Kanunnikov		(substituted on) 78'
Manager:
Stanislav Cherchesov

Man of the Match:
Hirving Lozano (Mexico)

Assistant referees:
Abdullah Al-Shalawi (Saudi Arabia)
Mohammed Al-Abakry (Saudi Arabia)
Fourth official:
Alireza Faghani (Iran)
Video assistant referees:
Ravshan Irmatov (Uzbekistan)
Reza Sokhandan (Iran)
Assistant video assistant referee:
Jair Marrufo (United States)

=== New Zealand vs Portugal ===
24 June 2017
18:00

New Zealand	0–4	Portugal
	Report	Ronaldo 33' (pen.); B. Silva 37'; A. Silva 80'; Nani 90+1'

Krestovsky Stadium, Saint Petersburg
Attendance: 56,290
Referee: Mark Geiger (United States)

New Zealand	Portugal

GK	1	Stefan Marinovic
CB	5	Michael Boxall
CB	22	Andrew Durante		(substituted off) 74'
CB	20	Tommy Smith
RWB	16	Dane Ingham	(yellow card) 82'
LWB	17	Tom Doyle
CM	15	Clayton Lewis	(yellow card) 19'	(substituted off) 65'
CM	8	Michael McGlinchey		(substituted off) 37'
CM	14	Ryan Thomas
CF	11	Marco Rojas
CF	9	Chris Wood (c)
Substitutions:
MF	6	Bill Tuiloma		(substituted on) 37'
FW	7	Kosta Barbarouses		(substituted on) 65'
FW	10	Shane Smeltz		(substituted on) 74'
Manager:
(England) Anthony Hudson

GK	1	Rui Patrício
RB	11	Nélson Semedo	(yellow card) 21'
CB	3	Pepe	(yellow card) 56'
CB	2	Bruno Alves
LB	19	Eliseu
RM	20	Ricardo Quaresma		(substituted off) 83'
CM	13	Danilo Pereira
CM	8	João Moutinho
LM	10	Bernardo Silva		(substituted off) 46'
CF	9	André Silva
CF	7	Cristiano Ronaldo (c)		(substituted off) 67'
Substitutions:
MF	16	Pizzi		(substituted on) 46'
FW	17	Nani		(substituted on) 67'
FW	18	Gelson Martins		(substituted on) 83'
Manager:
Fernando Santos

Man of the Match:
Cristiano Ronaldo (Portugal)

Assistant referees:
Joe Fletcher (Canada)
Charles Justin Morgante (United States)
Fourth official:
Damir Skomina (Slovenia)
Video assistant referees:
Sandro Ricci (Brazil)
Jure Praprotnik (Slovenia)
Assistant video assistant referee:
Ovidiu Hațegan (Romania)
