= 2017 FIFA Confederations Cup =

10th and last FIFA Confederations Cup, held in Russia in 2017

Кубок конфедераций FIFA 2017 Kubok konfederatsiy FIFA 2017

Tournament details
- Host country: Russia
- Dates: 17 June – 2 July
- Teams: 8 (from 6 confederations)
- Venues: 4 (in 4 host cities)

Final positions
- Champions: Germany (1st title)
- Runners-up: Chile
- Third place: Portugal
- Fourth place: Mexico

Tournament statistics
- Matches played: 16
- Goals scored: 43 (2.69 per match)
- Attendance: 628,304 (39,269 per match)
- Top scorer(s): (Germany) Leon Goretzka (Germany) Lars Stindl (Germany) Timo Werner (3 goals each)
- Best player: (Germany) Julian Draxler
- Best goalkeeper: (Chile) Claudio Bravo
- Fair play award: Germany

The 2017 FIFA Confederations Cup was the tenth and final edition of the FIFA Confederations Cup, a quadrennial international men's football tournament organised by FIFA. It was held in Russia, from 17 June to 2 July 2017, as a prelude to the 2018 FIFA World Cup.

Russia was announced as the host on 2 December 2010 after the country was awarded the hosting rights of the 2018 FIFA World Cup. The matches were played in four stadiums in four cities: Saint Petersburg, Moscow, Kazan, and Sochi. It was the only time Russia hosted the tournament and the third time the Confederations Cup was held in the European continent. As hosts, Russia qualified automatically for the tournament; they were joined by the six winners of the FIFA confederation championships and the 2014 FIFA World Cup champions, Germany.

The final tournament was played in two stages: a group stage and a latter knockout stage. In the group stage, each team played three games in a group of four, with the winners and runners-up from each group advancing to the knockout stage. In the knockout stage, the four teams competed in single-elimination matches, beginning with the semi-finals and ending with the final match of the tournament. A third-place match was played between the two losing semi-finalist teams. The final match was also attended by young participants of the international children's social programme Football for Friendship from 64 countries.

The defending champions, Brazil, who won the previous three Confederations Cups (2005, 2009, 2013), failed to qualify for the first time since 1995 following their loss on penalties to Paraguay in the quarter-finals of the 2015 Copa América. 2015 AFC Asian Cup winners Australia became the first team to qualify from multiple confederations, having previously represented the OFC in 1997, 2001 and 2005. This was the only Confederations Cup to feature the video assistant referee (VAR).

World champions Germany won their only Confederations Cup title following a 1–0 win over Chile in the final.

This was the last Confederations Cup held before being folded by FIFA in order to make way for the FIFA Club World Cup expansion, along with the 2021 FIFA Arab Cup.

== Qualification ==
2017 FIFA Confederations Cup participating teams

The eight competing teams were the host nation, the reigning FIFA World Cup champions, and the six holders of the FIFA confederation championships. If any team qualified for multiple berths (such as, if the World Cup champions also won their continental championship), the next best-placed team from their continental championship would have qualified.

After Russia secured a spot in the tournament as the hosts, Germany were the first team to qualify via competition, after winning the 2014 FIFA World Cup in Brazil. The final match saw the Germans clinch the country's fourth world title through a 1–0 extra-time win against Argentina. Australia were the next team to qualify after beating South Korea 2–1 after extra time, in the 2015 AFC Asian Cup final. This victory marked Australia's first Asian Cup win since their move from the Oceania Football Confederation (OFC) in 2006. It was also the first time a team had become champions of two confederations, following Australia's four OFC Nations Cup titles. Chile were the fourth team to secure a spot at the 2017 FIFA Confederations Cup after defeating Argentina 4–1 on a penalty shoot-out following a 0–0 draw after extra time, in the 2015 Copa América final.

As 2015 CONCACAF Gold Cup champions, Mexico's qualifying path saw them face 2013 CONCACAF Gold Cup champions United States in the 2015 CONCACAF Cup play-off match. The new format, in which the two most recent CONCACAF Gold Cup winners compete to decide the representative team of CONCACAF, was won by Mexico 3–2 after extra time. New Zealand were the sixth team to qualify for the tournament after defeating Papua New Guinea 4–2 on a penalty shoot-out following a 0–0 draw after extra time, in the 2016 OFC Nations Cup final.

Portugal were the seventh team to qualify, after defeating host nation France 1–0 after extra time, in the UEFA Euro 2016 final. The 2017 Africa Cup of Nations winning team, Cameroon, took the eighth and final spot with their 2–1 win against Egypt in the 2017 Africa Cup of Nations final. This was the first time in FIFA Confederations Cup history that three national teams from any single confederation (Russia, Germany and Portugal from UEFA) participated in the tournament.

=== Qualified teams ===
The following teams qualified for the tournament.

Country	Confederation	Qualified as	Qualified on	Previous appearances in tournament
Russia	UEFA	Hosts	2 December 2010	0 (debut)
Germany	UEFA	2014 FIFA World Cup winners	13 July 2014	2 (1999, 2005)
Australia	AFC	2015 AFC Asian Cup winners	31 January 2015	3 (1997, 2001, 2005)
Chile	CONMEBOL	2015 Copa América winners	4 July 2015	0 (debut)
Mexico	CONCACAF	CONCACAF Cup winners	10 October 2015	6 (1995, 1997, 1999, 2001, 2005, 2013)
New Zealand	OFC	2016 OFC Nations Cup winners	11 June 2016	3 (1999, 2003, 2009)
Portugal	UEFA	UEFA Euro 2016 winners	10 July 2016	0 (debut)
Cameroon	CAF	2017 Africa Cup of Nations winners	5 February 2017	2 (2001, 2003)

== Venues ==
Four cities served as the venues for the 2017 FIFA Confederations Cup. All four venues were also among the 12 used for the 2018 FIFA World Cup.

On 8 October 2015, FIFA and the Local Organising Committee agreed on the official names of the stadiums used during the tournament.

Saint Petersburg	Location of the host cities of the 2017 FIFA Confederations Cup.	Moscow
Krestovsky Stadium (Saint Petersburg Stadium)	Location of the host cities of the 2017 FIFA Confederations Cup.	Otkritie Arena (Spartak Stadium)
Capacity: 68,134	Location of the host cities of the 2017 FIFA Confederations Cup.	Capacity: 45,360
Kazan	Location of the host cities of the 2017 FIFA Confederations Cup.	Sochi
Kazan Arena	Location of the host cities of the 2017 FIFA Confederations Cup.	Fisht Olympic Stadium (Fisht Stadium)
Capacity: 45,379	Location of the host cities of the 2017 FIFA Confederations Cup.	Capacity: 47,659

== Schedule ==
The full schedule was announced by FIFA on 24 July 2015 (without kick-off times, which were confirmed later). Russia was placed in position A1 in the group stage and played in the opening match against New Zealand at the Zenit Arena in Saint Petersburg on 17 June. The distribution of the knockout stage matches was as follows:

- The Krestovsky Stadium in Saint Petersburg hosted the final on 2 July.
- The Kazan Arena in Kazan hosted the first semi-final on 28 June.
- The Fisht Olympic Stadium in Sochi hosted the second semi-final on 29 June.
- The Otkritie Arena in Moscow hosted the third place match on 2 July.

== Draw ==
The draw took place on 26 November 2016, 18:00 MSK (UTC+3), at the Tennis Academy in Kazan.

For the draw, the eight teams were allocated to two pots. Pot 1 contained hosts Russia and the three highest-ranked teams in the November 2016 edition of the FIFA World Rankings (shown in parentheses below): Germany, Chile, and Portugal. Pot 2 contained the remaining four teams: Mexico, Australia, New Zealand and the winners of the 2017 Africa Cup of Nations (whose identity was not known at the time of the draw and regardless of their identity could not be among the three highest-ranked participating teams), which was won by Cameroon on 5 February 2017 to complete the line-up.

The eight teams were drawn into two groups of four with each group containing two teams from Pot 1 and two teams from Pot 2. During the draw procedure, teams were drawn into alternating groups (Group A, then Group B, repeating) and assigned a position within the group by drawing another ball. As hosts, Russia were automatically assigned to Position A1 in the draw. Since there were three teams from Europe, one of the two groups was certain to contain two teams from the same confederation (Russia and Portugal), the first time this happened in a FIFA Confederations Cup.

Pot 1	Pot 2
Russia (55; hosts) (Note: Assigned to A1); Germany (3); Chile (4); Portugal (8)	Mexico (18); Australia (48); Cameroon (65); New Zealand (110)

== Match officials ==
A total of 9 refereeing trios (a referee and two assistant referees), 1 support referee, and 8 video assistant referees were appointed for the tournament.

Confederation	Referee	Assistant referees	Support referee	Video assistant referee
AFC	(Saudi Arabia) Fahad Al-Mirdasi	(Saudi Arabia) Abdullah Al-Shalawi (Saudi Arabia) Mohammed Al-Abakry	–	(Uzbekistan) Ravshan Irmatov
AFC	(Iran) Alireza Faghani	(Iran) Reza Sokhandan (Iran) Mohammadreza Mansouri	–	(Uzbekistan) Ravshan Irmatov
CAF	(The Gambia) Bakary Gassama	(Burundi) Jean-Claude Birumushahu (Kenya) Marwa Range	–	(Senegal) Malang Diedhiou
CONCACAF	(United States) Mark Geiger	(Canada) Joe Fletcher (United States) Charles Justin Morgante	–	(United States) Jair Marrufo
CONMEBOL	(Argentina) Néstor Pitana	(Argentina) Hernán Maidana (Argentina) Juan Pablo Belatti	–	(Paraguay) Enrique Cáceres (Brazil) Sandro Ricci
CONMEBOL	(Colombia) Wilmar Roldán	(Colombia) Alexander Guzman (Colombia) Cristian De La Cruz	–	(Paraguay) Enrique Cáceres (Brazil) Sandro Ricci
OFC	–	–	(French Polynesia) Abdelkader Zitouni	–
UEFA	(Serbia) Milorad Mažić	(Serbia) Milovan Ristić (Serbia) Dalibor Đurđević	–	(Portugal) Artur Soares Dias (Romania) Ovidiu Hațegan (France) Clément Turpin
UEFA	(Italy) Gianluca Rocchi	(Italy) Elenito Di Liberatore (Italy) Mauro Tonolini	–	(Portugal) Artur Soares Dias (Romania) Ovidiu Hațegan (France) Clément Turpin
UEFA	(Slovenia) Damir Skomina	(Slovenia) Jure Praprotnik (Slovenia) Robert Vukan	–	(Portugal) Artur Soares Dias (Romania) Ovidiu Hațegan (France) Clément Turpin

== Match ball ==
The official match ball for the Cup was produced by Adidas and was named "Krasava", which is a Russian slang word for "beautiful" or "awesome".

== Squads ==
Each team had to name a preliminary squad of 30 players. From the preliminary squad, the team had to name a final squad of 23 players (three of whom must be goalkeepers) by the FIFA deadline. Players in the final squad could be replaced due to serious injury up to 24 hours prior to kickoff of the team's first match, where the replacement players did not need to be in the preliminary squad. The official squads were announced by FIFA on 8 June 2017.

== Group stage ==
All times are local, MSK (UTC+3).

=== Tiebreakers ===
The top two teams of each group advanced to the semi-finals. The rankings of teams in each group were determined as follows (regulations Article 19.6):

1. points obtained in all group matches;
2. goal difference in all group matches;
3. number of goals scored in all group matches;

If two or more teams were equal on the basis of the above three criteria, their rankings were determined as follows:

4. points obtained in the group matches between the teams concerned;
5. goal difference in the group matches between the teams concerned;
6. number of goals scored in the group matches between the teams concerned;
7. fair play points
  - first yellow card: minus 1 point;
  - indirect red card (second yellow card): minus 3 points;
  - direct red card: minus 4 points;
  - yellow card and direct red card: minus 5 points;
8. drawing of lots by the FIFA Organising Committee.

=== Group A ===
Pos	Team	Pld	W	D	L	GF	GA	GD	Pts	Qualification
1	Portugal	3	2	1	0	7	2	+5	7	Advance to knockout stage
2	Mexico	3	2	1	0	6	4	+2	7	Advance to knockout stage
3	Russia (H)	3	1	0	2	3	3	0	3	
4	New Zealand	3	0	0	3	1	8	−7	0	

Source: FIFA
(H) Hosts
17 June 2017
18:00

Russia	2–0	New Zealand
Boxall 31' (o.g.); Smolov 69'	Report

Krestovsky Stadium, Saint Petersburg
Attendance: 50,251
Referee: Wilmar Roldán (Colombia)
18 June 2017
18:00

Portugal	2–2	Mexico
Quaresma 34'; Cédric 86'	Report	Hernández 42'; Moreno 90+1'

Kazan Arena, Kazan
Attendance: 34,372
Referee: Néstor Pitana (Argentina)

21 June 2017
18:00

Russia	0–1	Portugal
	Report	Ronaldo 8'

Otkritie Arena, Moscow
Attendance: 42,759
Referee: Gianluca Rocchi (Italy)
21 June 2017
21:00

Mexico	2–1	New Zealand
Jiménez 54'; Peralta 72'	Report	Wood 42'

Fisht Olympic Stadium, Sochi
Attendance: 25,133
Referee: Bakary Gassama (Gambia)

24 June 2017
18:00

Mexico	2–1	Russia
Araujo 30'; Lozano 52'	Report	Samedov 25'

Kazan Arena, Kazan
Attendance: 41,585
Referee: Fahad Al-Mirdasi (Saudi Arabia)
24 June 2017
18:00

New Zealand	0–4	Portugal
	Report	Ronaldo 33' (pen.); B. Silva 37'; A. Silva 80'; Nani 90+1'

Krestovsky Stadium, Saint Petersburg
Attendance: 56,290
Referee: Mark Geiger (United States)

=== Group B ===
Pos	Team	Pld	W	D	L	GF	GA	GD	Pts	Qualification
1	Germany	3	2	1	0	7	4	+3	7	Advance to knockout stage
2	Chile	3	1	2	0	4	2	+2	5	Advance to knockout stage
3	Australia	3	0	2	1	4	5	−1	2	
4	Cameroon	3	0	1	2	2	6	−4	1	

Source: FIFA
18 June 2017
21:00

Cameroon	0–2	Chile
	Report	Vidal 81'; Vargas 90+1'

Otkritie Arena, Moscow
Attendance: 33,492
Referee: Damir Skomina (Slovenia)
19 June 2017
18:00

Australia	2–3	Germany
Rogic 41'; Juric 56'	Report	Stindl 5'; Draxler 44' (pen.); Goretzka 48'

Fisht Olympic Stadium, Sochi
Attendance: 28,605
Referee: Mark Geiger (United States)

22 June 2017
18:00

Cameroon	1–1	Australia
Zambo Anguissa 45+1'	Report	Milligan 60' (pen.)

Krestovsky Stadium, Saint Petersburg
Attendance: 35,021
Referee: Milorad Mažić (Serbia)
22 June 2017
21:00

Germany	1–1	Chile
Stindl 41'	Report	Sánchez 6'

Kazan Arena, Kazan
Attendance: 38,222
Referee: Alireza Faghani (Iran)

25 June 2017
18:00

Germany	3–1	Cameroon
Demirbay 48'; Werner 66', 81'	Report	Aboubakar 78'

Fisht Olympic Stadium, Sochi
Attendance: 30,230
Referee: Wilmar Roldán (Colombia)
25 June 2017
18:00

Chile	1–1	Australia
Rodríguez 67'	Report	Troisi 42'

Otkritie Arena, Moscow
Attendance: 33,639
Referee: Gianluca Rocchi (Italy)

== Knockout stage ==
In the knockout stage, if a match was level at the end of normal playing time, extra time was played (two periods of 15 minutes each), where each team was allowed to make a fourth substitution. If still tied after extra time, the match was decided by a penalty shoot-out to determine the winners.

=== Bracket ===
Semi-finals
28 June — Kazan
Portugal	0 (0)
Chile (p)	0 (3)
29 June — Sochi
Germany	4
Mexico	1

Final
2 July — Saint Petersburg
Chile	0
Germany	1
Third place play-off
2 July — Moscow
Portugal (a.e.t.)	2
Mexico	1

=== Semi-finals ===
28 June 2017
21:00

Portugal	0–0 (a.e.t.)	Chile
	Report
Penalties
Quaresma (penalty missed); Moutinho (penalty missed); Nani (penalty missed)	0–3	(penalty scored) Vidal; (penalty scored) Aránguiz; (penalty scored) Sánchez

Kazan Arena, Kazan
Attendance: 40,855
Referee: Alireza Faghani (Iran)

29 June 2017
21:00

Germany	4–1	Mexico
Goretzka 6', 8'; Werner 59'; Younes 90+1'	Report	Fabián 89'

Fisht Olympic Stadium, Sochi
Attendance: 37,923
Referee: Néstor Pitana (Argentina)

=== Third place play-off ===
2 July 2017
15:00

Portugal	2–1 (a.e.t.)	Mexico
Pepe 90+1'; Adrien 104' (pen.)	Report	Neto 54' (o.g.)

Otkritie Arena, Moscow
Attendance: 42,659
Referee: Fahad Al-Mirdasi (Saudi Arabia)

=== Final ===
2 July 2017
21:00

Chile	0–1	Germany
	Report	Stindl 20'

Krestovsky Stadium, Saint Petersburg
Attendance: 57,268
Referee: Milorad Mažić (Serbia)

== Awards ==
The following awards were given at the conclusion of the tournament. The player awards were all sponsored by Adidas.

Golden Ball	Silver Ball	Bronze Ball
(Germany) Julian Draxler	(Chile) Alexis Sánchez	(Germany) Leon Goretzka
Golden Boot	Silver Boot	
(Germany) Timo Werner	(Germany) Leon Goretzka	(Germany) Lars Stindl
3 goals, 2 assists	3 goals, 0 assists	
Golden Glove
(Chile) Claudio Bravo
FIFA Fair Play Trophy
Germany

Additionally, FIFA.com shortlisted six goals so that football fans could vote on the tournaments' best. The poll closed on 10 July.

Hyundai Goal of the Tournament
Goalscorer	Opponent	Score	Round
(Mexico) Marco Fabián	Germany	3–1	Semi-finals

== Statistics ==
=== Goalscorers ===
There were 43 goals scored in 16 matches, for an average of 2.69 goals per match.

3 goals

- (Germany) Leon Goretzka
- (Germany) Lars Stindl
- (Germany) Timo Werner

2 goals

- (Portugal) Cristiano Ronaldo

1 goal

- (Australia) Tomi Juric
- (Australia) Mark Milligan
- (Australia) Tom Rogic
- (Australia) James Troisi
- (Cameroon) Vincent Aboubakar
- (Cameroon) André-Frank Zambo Anguissa
- (Chile) Martín Rodríguez
- (Chile) Alexis Sánchez
- (Chile) Eduardo Vargas
- (Chile) Arturo Vidal
- (Germany) Kerem Demirbay
- (Germany) Julian Draxler
- (Germany) Amin Younes
- (Mexico) Néstor Araujo
- (Mexico) Marco Fabián
- (Mexico) Javier Hernández
- (Mexico) Raúl Jiménez
- (Mexico) Hirving Lozano
- (Mexico) Héctor Moreno
- (Mexico) Oribe Peralta
- (New Zealand) Chris Wood
- (Portugal) Adrien Silva
- (Portugal) Cédric
- (Portugal) Nani
- (Portugal) Pepe
- (Portugal) Ricardo Quaresma
- (Portugal) André Silva
- (Portugal) Bernardo Silva
- (Russia) Aleksandr Samedov
- (Russia) Fyodor Smolov

1 own goal

- (New Zealand) Michael Boxall (against Russia)
- (Portugal) Luís Neto (against Mexico)

Source: FIFA

=== Tournament ranking ===
Per statistical convention in football, matches decided in extra time are counted as wins and losses, while matches decided by penalty shoot-outs are counted as draws.

Pos	Grp	Team	Pld	W	D	L	GF	GA	GD	Pts	Final result
1	B	Germany	5	4	1	0	12	5	+7	13	Champions
2	B	Chile	5	1	3	1	4	3	+1	6	Runners-up
3	A	Portugal	5	3	2	0	9	3	+6	11	Third place
4	A	Mexico	5	2	1	2	8	10	−2	7	Fourth place
5	A	Russia (H)	3	1	0	2	3	3	0	3	Eliminated in group stage
6	B	Australia	3	0	2	1	4	5	−1	2	Eliminated in group stage
7	B	Cameroon	3	0	1	2	2	6	−4	1	Eliminated in group stage
8	A	New Zealand	3	0	0	3	1	8	−7	0	Eliminated in group stage

Source: FIFA
(H) Hosts

== Prize money ==
Based on final position, teams received prize money from FIFA.

Competition stage	Final position	Prize money (US dollars)
Final	Winners	$5,000,000
Final	Runners-up	$4,500,000
Match for third place	Third place	$3,500,000
Match for third place	Fourth place	$3,000,000
Group stage	Fifth to eighth place	$2,000,000

== Ticketing ==
Tickets were distributed in four stages: pre-sale for holders of Visa cards, random draw, first-come first-served, and last-minute sales.

== Sponsorship ==
FIFA partners	FIFA World Cup sponsors	European supporters
Adidas; Coca-Cola; Gazprom; Hyundai–Kia; Qatar Airways; Visa; Wanda Group	Anheuser-Busch InBev; Hisense; McDonald's; Vivo	Alfa-Bank

== Broadcasting rights ==
Territory	Broadcaster	Ref.
Albania	RTSH	
Argentina	TyC, DirecTV	
Armenia	ARMTV	
Australia	SBS, Optus Sport	
Austria	ORF	
Azerbaijan	Idman Azerbaijan, İTV	
Belarus	BTRC	
Belgium	VRT, RTBF	
Bolivia	Unitel, Red Uno, DirecTV	
Bosnia and Herzegovina	BHRT	
Brazil	Globo, SporTV, Band	
Brunei	Astro	
Bulgaria	BNT	
Canada	RDS, TSN	
Chile	Canal 13, TVN, Mega, DirecTV	
China	Tencent Sports	
Colombia	Caracol TV, RCN TV, DirecTV	
Costa Rica	Teletica, Sky	
Croatia	HRT	
Cyprus	CyBC	
Czech Republic	ČT	
Denmark	DR, TV 2	
Ecuador	RTS	
El Salvador	TCS, Sky	
Estonia	ERR	
Faroe Islands	DR	
Finland	Yle	
France	TF1, SFR Sport	
Germany	ARD, ZDF	
Georgia	GPB	
Greece	ERT	
Greenland	DR, TV 2	
Guatemala	TVA, Sky	
Honduras	Televicentro, Sky	
Hong Kong	LeSports	
Hungary	MTVA	
Iceland	RÚV	
India	Sony Pictures Networks	
Indonesia	RTV, OrangeTV	
Ireland	RTÉ	
Israel	KAN	
Italy	Sky	
Japan	Fuji TV, NHK	
Kosovo	RTK	
Latvia	LTV	
Liechtenstein	SRG SSR	
Lithuania	LRT	
Macau	TDM	
Malaysia	Astro	
Malta	PBS	
MENA (Note: excludes Israel)	beIN Sports	
Mexico	Televisa, TV Azteca	
Moldova	TRM	
Montenegro	RTCG	
Nepal	Sony Pictures Networks	
Netherlands	NOS	
New Zealand	Prime, Sky Sport	
Nicaragua	Ratensa	
Norway	NRK, TV 2	
Pakistan	Sony Pictures Networks	
Panama	Corporación Medcom, Televisora Nacional, Sky	
Paraguay	TyC	
Peru	Latina Televisión, DirecTV	
Philippines	ABS-CBN	
Poland	TVP	
Portugal	RTP	
Puerto Rico	Telemundo Puerto Rico, Punto 2	
Romania	TVR	
Russia	Channel One, Match TV	
Serbia	RTS	
Slovenia	RTVSLO	
South Africa	SABC, SuperSport	
South Korea	KBS, MBC, SBS	
Spain	GOL	
Sub-Saharan Africa (Note: excludes South Africa)	SuperSport, Star Times	
Sweden	SVT	
Switzerland	SRG SSR	
Taiwan	ELTA TV	
Tajikistan	TV Varzish	
Thailand	Channel 3	
Turkey	TRT	
United Kingdom	ITV (Note: ITV did not broadcast the third-place match)	
United States	Fox, Telemundo	
Uruguay	Monte Carlo TV, Canal 10, Teledoce, TyC	
Venezuela	Meridiano Televisión, Venevisión	

== Logistics ==
Free travel via additional trains travelling between host cities during the sporting events were provided to spectators holding match tickets or documents granting access to the match, along with FAN ID.

FAN IDs were issued to all spectators of the FIFA Confederations Cup 2017 for access to a stadium. FAN ID gave the opportunity to use free transport services on the match days in the cities hosting the sports events. The foreign citizens, who come to the Russian Federation as spectators of the FIFA Confederations Cup 2017 matches, could use their FAN IDs for multiple visa-free entry into and exit from the Russian Federation upon presentation of valid identity documents that are recognized as such by the Russian Federation, during the period that started ten days before the date of the first match and ended ten days after the date of the last match of the FIFA Confederations Cup 2017.

In 2015, the Russian Ministry of Sport and Local Organising Committee launched a website aimed at providing coverage of the preparation process ahead of the 2017 FIFA Confederations Cup and 2018 FIFA World Cup.
