= Amin Younes =

German footballer (born 1993)

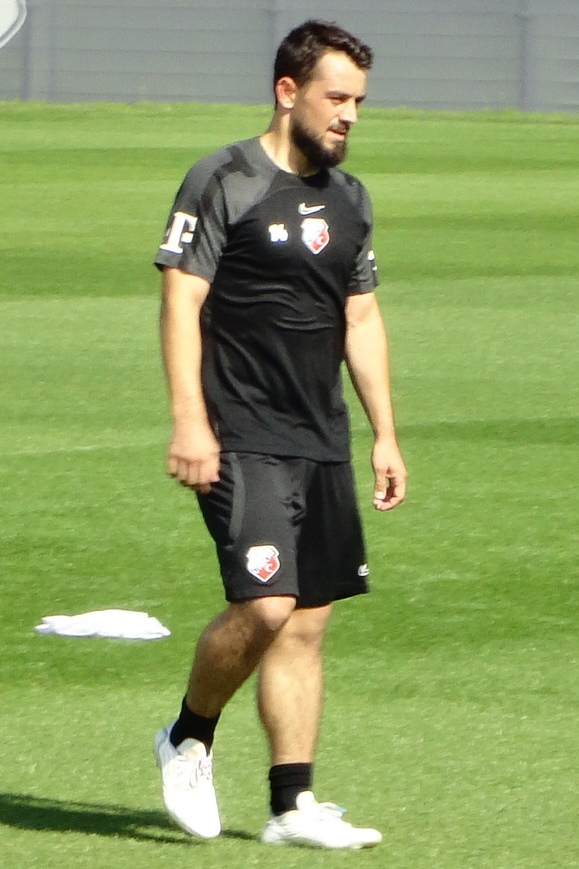
- Younes with Utrecht in 2022

Personal information
- Full name: Amin Younes
- Date of birth: 6 August 1993 (age 33)
- Place of birth: Düsseldorf, Germany
- Height: 1.68 m (5 ft 6 in)
- Positions: Left winger; attacking midfielder

Youth career
- 1997–2000: SG Unterrath
- 2000–2011: Borussia Mönchengladbach

Senior career*
Years	Team	Apps	(Gls)
2011–2013	Borussia Mönchengladbach II	37	(4)
2012–2015	Borussia Mönchengladbach	26	(1)
2014–2015	→ 1. FC Kaiserslautern (loan)	14	(2)
2015–2018	Jong Ajax	5	(2)
2015–2018	Ajax	69	(12)
2018–2022	Napoli	21	(4)
2020–2022	→ Eintracht Frankfurt (loan)	26	(3)
2022–2023	Al-Ettifaq	9	(2)
2022–2023	→ Utrecht (loan)	10	(0)
2024–2026	Schalke 04	30	(2)

International career
2008–2009	Germany U16	1	(1)
2009–2010	Germany U17	10	(4)
2010–2011	Germany U18	6	(1)
2011–2012	Germany U19	8	(2)
2012–2013	Germany U20	2	(0)
2013–2015	Germany U21	18	(3)
2017–2021	Germany	8	(2)
Medal record
Representing Germany
FIFA Confederations Cup
Winner	2017
- * Club domestic league appearances and goals as of 18 February 2026

Amin Younes (born 6 August 1993) is a German professional footballer who plays as a winger or attacking midfielder.

Coming through the youth system, Younes made his senior debut for Borussia Mönchengladbach in 2012. After a one-season loan spell at 1. FC Kaiserslautern, Younes moved to Dutch club Ajax in 2015, with whom he was runner-up in the 2016–17 UEFA Europa League. In 2018 Younes moved to Italian side Napoli on a free transfer, winning the 2019–20 Coppa Italia. After two seasons, he moved back to Germany playing for Eintracht Frankfurt between 2020 and 2022. He then spent half a season in Saudi Arabia at Al-Ettifaq in 2022, and one season on loan at Utrecht in 2022–23, before becoming a free agent in 2023. He signed for Schalke 04 in the 2. Bundesliga in 2024.

Younes represented Germany at youth level between 2008 and 2015, and the senior team between 2017 and 2021. He was part of the squad that won the 2017 FIFA Confederations Cup.

== Club career ==
=== Borussia Mönchengladbach ===
Born in Düsseldorf to a Lebanese father, a former footballer, and a German mother; Younes played as a youth for SG Unterrath. In 2000, at the age of 8, he joined the youth setup of Bundesliga side Borussia Mönchengladbach. In 2011, he made his debut for Borussia Mönchengladbach II, the reserve team, playing in the Regionalliga West.

Younes made his senior team debut at the end of the 2011–12 Bundesliga, coming on as a substitute against Hannover 96 on 1 April 2012.

==== 1. FC Kaiserslautern (loan) ====
In August 2014, Younes joined 2. Bundesliga club 1. FC Kaiserslautern on a season-long loan.

=== Ajax ===
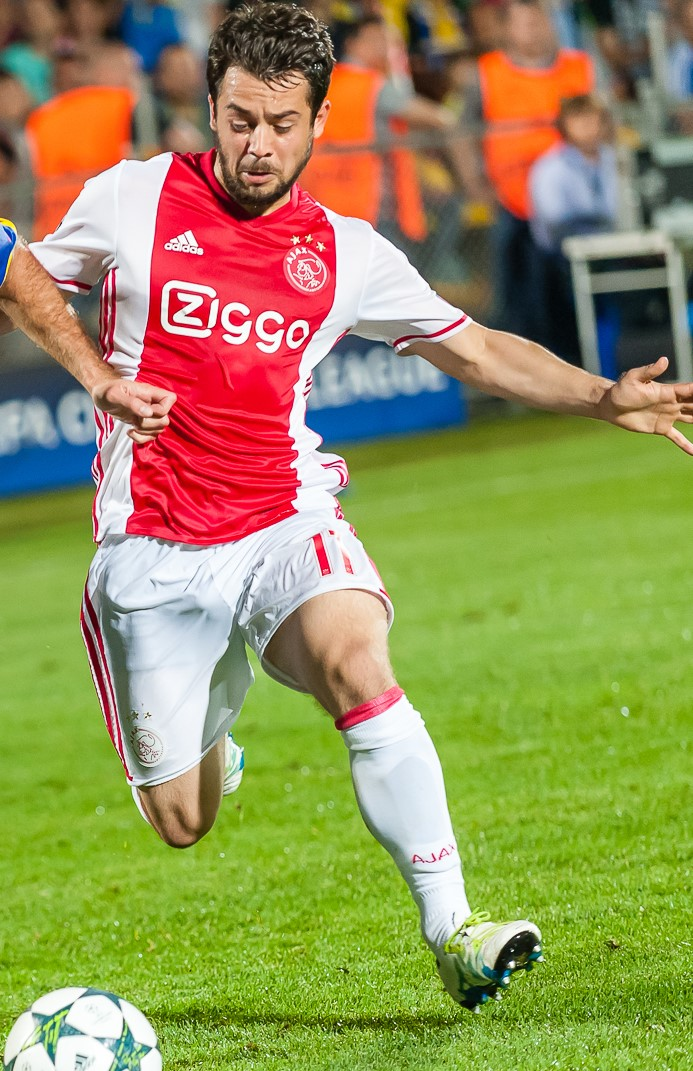
Younes playing for Ajax in 2016

On 16 July 2015, Younes signed a three-year contract for Dutch club Ajax, until 30 June 2018, with an option for an additional year for €2,5 million. After an injury, which kept him out for the start of the championship, he made his debut as a starter against Groningen (2–0) on 26 September. The following week he scored his first goal for Ajax, against PSV in a 1–2 defeat. Over the weeks, the player found continuity and concluded his first season with eight goals and nine assists in 35 total games. On 20 October 2016, he scored his first goal in a UEFA competition by scoring against Celta Vigo (2–2) in the UEFA Europa League. At the end of the season he played in the 2017 UEFA Europa League final lost to Manchester United. Younes was the player with the most dribbles in the competition.

=== Napoli ===
In July 2018 Younes moved to Serie A side Napoli on a free transfer. When Younes moved to Napoli, he requested number 34 shirt in tribute to former Ajax teammate Abdelhak Nouri, who collapsed and suffered brain damage, ending his career. His league debut came on 8 December 2018, against Frosinone in a 4–0 win. Younes' first goal for Napoli, and in the Serie A, came on 17 March 2019, in a 4–2 home victory over Udinese.

==== Eintracht Frankfurt (loan) ====
On 3 October 2020, Eintracht Frankfurt announced the signing of Younes on a two-year loan from Napoli with an option to buy. On 18 January 2022, the loan was terminated early by consent from Younes, Eintracht and Napoli.

=== Al-Ettifaq ===
On 23 January 2022, Younes signed a contract with Al-Ettifaq in Saudi Arabia until 2024.

==== Utrecht (loan) ====
On 31 August 2022, Younes joined Utrecht in the Netherlands on loan for the 2022–23 season.

==== Release by Al-Ettifaq ====
On 27 July 2023 Younes announced on Instagram that his contract at Al-Ettifaq had been terminated by mutual consent.

=== Schalke 04 ===
After almost a year without a club, Younes signed a two-year contract with 2. Bundesliga club Schalke 04 on 5 June 2024. On 18 February 2026, he and Schalke agreed to terminate his contract.

== International career ==
Eligible to also represent Lebanon through his father, Joachim Löw called Younes up to the Germany national team for the first time on 17 May 2017, as part of the squad for the 2017 FIFA Confederations Cup.

His senior debut came on 6 June 2017, coming on as a substitute in a 1–1 draw with Denmark. Younes scored his first goal for the national team in a 2018 FIFA World Cup qualifier against San Marino on 10 June 2017. On 29 June 2017, he scored his second goal in the 2017 FIFA Confederations Cup semi-final game against Mexico, which Germany won 4–1. Germany were crowned champions after beating Chile 1–0 in the final.

== Personal life ==
Younes was born in Germany to a Lebanese father from Tripoli, Zoulfikar – who also played football, and a German mother, Astrid. Younes has an older brother named Phillip, who plays amateur football, and a younger brother named Carim. During the summer, Younes usually visits his family from his father's side in Lebanon. He is a practicing Muslim.

== Style of play ==
A technical forward, Younes' main characteristics are his dribbling, pace, and vision of play.

== Career statistics ==
=== Club ===
As of match played 31 January 2026

Appearances and goals by club, season and competition
Club	Season	League			National cup (Note: Includes DFB-Pokal, KNVB Cup, Coppa Italia)		Continental		Total	
Club	Season	Division	Apps	Goals	Apps	Goals	Apps	Goals	Apps	Goals
Borussia Mönchengladbach II	2010–11	Regionalliga West	6	0	—		—		6	0
Borussia Mönchengladbach II	2011–12	Regionalliga West	20	3	—		—		20	3
Borussia Mönchengladbach II	2012–13	Regionalliga West	11	0	—		—		11	0
Borussia Mönchengladbach II	Total		37	3	0	0	0	0	37	3
Borussia Mönchengladbach	2011–12	Bundesliga	1	0	0	0	—		1	0
Borussia Mönchengladbach	2012–13	Bundesliga	11	1	0	0	2 (Note: Appearances in UEFA Europa League)	0	13	1
Borussia Mönchengladbach	2013–14	Bundesliga	14	0	0	0	—		14	0
Borussia Mönchengladbach	Total		26	1	0	0	2	0	28	1
1. FC Kaiserslautern (loan)	2014–15	2. Bundesliga	14	2	1	0	—		15	2
1. FC Kaiserslautern II (loan)	2014–15	Regionalliga Südwest	3	0	—		—		3	0
Jong Ajax	2015–16	Eerste Divisie	4	1	—		—		4	1
Jong Ajax	2017–18	Eerste Divisie	1	1	—		—		1	1
Jong Ajax	Total		5	2	0	0	0	0	5	2
Ajax	2015–16	Eredivisie	27	8	2	0	6	0	35	8
Ajax	2016–17	Eredivisie	29	3	1	0	18 (Note: Three appearances in UEFA Champions League, fifteen appearances and four goals in UEFA Europa League)	4	48	7
Ajax	2017–18	Eredivisie	13	1	0	0	4 (Note: Two appearances in UEFA Champions League, two appearances and one goal in UEFA Europa League)	1	17	2
Ajax	Total		69	12	3	0	28	5	100	17
Napoli	2018–19	Serie A	12	3	1	0	3	0	16	3
Napoli	2019–20	Serie A	9	1	1	0	1 (Note: Appearance in UEFA Champions League)	0	11	1
Napoli	Total		21	4	2	0	4	0	27	4
Eintracht Frankfurt (loan)	2020–21	Bundesliga	26	3	1	1	—		27	4
Eintracht Frankfurt (loan)	2021–22	Bundesliga	0	0	1	0	0	0	1	0
Eintracht Frankfurt (loan)	Total		26	3	2	1	0	0	28	4
Al-Ettifaq	2021–22	Saudi Pro League	9	2	—		—		9	2
Utrecht (loan)	2022–23	Eredivisie	10	0	1	0	—		11	0
Schalke 04	2024–25	2. Bundesliga	25	2	0	0	—		25	2
Schalke 04	2025–26	2. Bundesliga	5	0	1	0	—		6	0
Schalke 04	Total		30	2	1	0	0	0	31	2
Career total			250	31	10	1	34	5	294	37

=== International ===
Appearances and goals by national team and year
National team	Year	Apps	Goals
Germany
Germany	2017	5	2
Germany	2021	3	0
Total		8	2

Scores and results list Germany's goal tally first, score column indicates score after each Younes goal.

List of international goals scored by Amin Younes
No.	Date	Venue	Opponent	Score	Result	Competition
1	10 June 2017	Stadion Nürnberg, Nuremberg, Germany	San Marino	4–0	7–0	2018 FIFA World Cup qualification
2	29 June 2017	Fisht Olympic Stadium, Sochi, Russia	Mexico	4–1	4–1	2017 FIFA Confederations Cup

== Honours ==
Ajax

- UEFA Europa League runner-up: 2016–17

Jong Ajax

- Eerste Divisie: 2017–18

Napoli

- Coppa Italia: 2019–20

Germany

- FIFA Confederations Cup: 2017

Individual

- UEFA Europa League Squad of the Season: 2016–17
