= Gonzalo Jara (footballer, born 1985) =

Chilean footballer

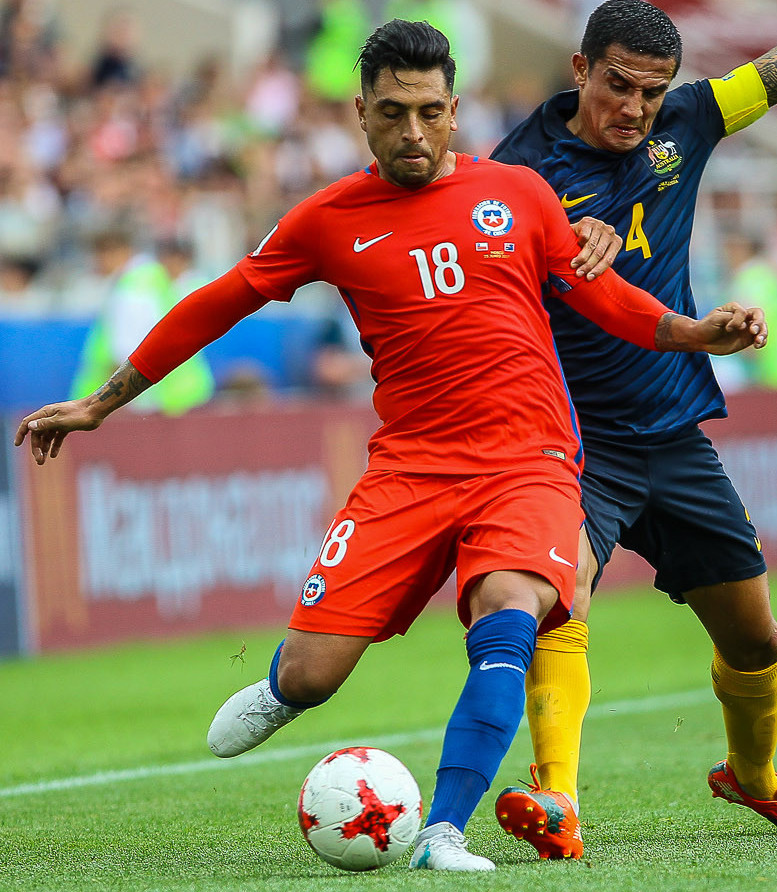
- Jara playing for Chile at the 2017 FIFA Confederations Cup

Personal information
- Full name: Gonzalo Alejandro Jara Reyes
- Date of birth: 29 August 1985 (age 41)
- Place of birth: Hualpén, Chile
- Height: 1.78 m (5 ft 10 in)
- Position: Centre back

Youth career
- Huachipato

Senior career*
Years	Team	Apps	(Gls)
2003–2006	Huachipato	69	(1)
2007–2009	Colo-Colo	64	(1)
2009–2013	West Bromwich Albion	56	(2)
2011	→ Brighton & Hove Albion (loan)	4	(0)
2012	→ Brighton & Hove Albion (loan)	10	(0)
2013	→ Nottingham Forest (loan)	16	(0)
2013–2014	Nottingham Forest	32	(0)
2014–2016	Mainz 05	23	(0)
2016–2018	Universidad de Chile	58	(0)
2019	Estudiantes	15	(0)
2020	Morelia	6	(0)
2020	Mazatlán	9	(0)
2021	Tijuana	13	(0)
2021	Unión La Calera	7	(0)
2022–2023	Coquimbo Unido	15	(0)
Total		397	(4)

International career
2005	Chile U20	3	(1)
2006–2019	Chile	115	(3)
Medal record
Representing Chile
Winner	Copa América	2015
Winner	Copa América Centenario	2016
Runner-up	FIFA Confederations Cup	2017
- * Club domestic league appearances and goals

Gonzalo Alejandro Jara Reyes (Spanish pronunciation: [ɡonˈsalo ˈxaɾa]; born 29 August 1985) is a Chilean former professional footballer who played as a defender. He was a versatile defender and could play in either a full-back role or as a centre-back.

Formed at Huachipato, he later won three league titles at Colo-Colo. In 2009, he moved to England, where he represented West Bromwich Albion, Brighton & Hove Albion and Nottingham Forest, joining Mainz in 2014.

Jara has played for the Chile national team since 2006, earning over 100 caps. He played in two FIFA World Cups (2010 and 2014), and four Copa América, being part of the team that won the title in 2015 and in 2016, in the Copa América Centenario.

== Club career ==
Born in Hualpén, Jara made his professional debut in 2003 for Huachipato, where he played until his 2007 transfer to Colo-Colo.

Colo-Colo agreed to transfer him to English Championship team West Bromwich Albion for a fee of $3 million in August 2009, but the buying club chose not to proceed with the deal. However, they later resurrected the deal and Jara signed for Albion for a fee of £1.4 million on a three-year contract on 25 August 2009. He scored his first goal for West Brom in a 2–1 away win against Leicester City on 7 November 2009. His second came against Arsenal on 25 September 2010, scoring in a 3–2 victory for West Brom at the Emirates Stadium.

On 21 October 2011, Jara joined Championship side Brighton & Hove Albion on a loan deal initially lasting until January 2012. However, on 20 December 2011, West Brom recalled him and two other players also on loan at other clubs due to an injury crisis. Jara returned to Brighton & Hove Albion on a loan deal lasting until the end of the season on 31 January 2012.

He joined another Championship side, Nottingham Forest, on loan until the end of the season on 10 January 2013. On 19 June, after his release from West Bromwich, he joined Forest on a permanent one-year deal. He was one of seven players released from the club on 27 May 2014.

On 16 July 2014, he was given a two-year contract with an option for a third year by Mainz 05. On 16 January 2016, he agreed to terminate his contract with them.

Back in Chile, Jara joined Unión La Calera in September 2021. The next year, he switched to Coquimbo Unido, his last club until December 2023.

== International career ==
=== Youth teams ===
In 2005, Jara represented Chile at the 2005 FIFA World Youth Championship in the Netherlands, scoring a goal in Chile's 7–0 victory over Honduras. Jara was Chile's captain in the prestigious 2008 Under-23 Toulon Tournament, where he has played in the 5–3 victory against France, as well as the 2–0 victories against the Netherlands and Japan. He missed the semi-final match versus Ivory Coast due to yellow cards.

=== Senior team ===
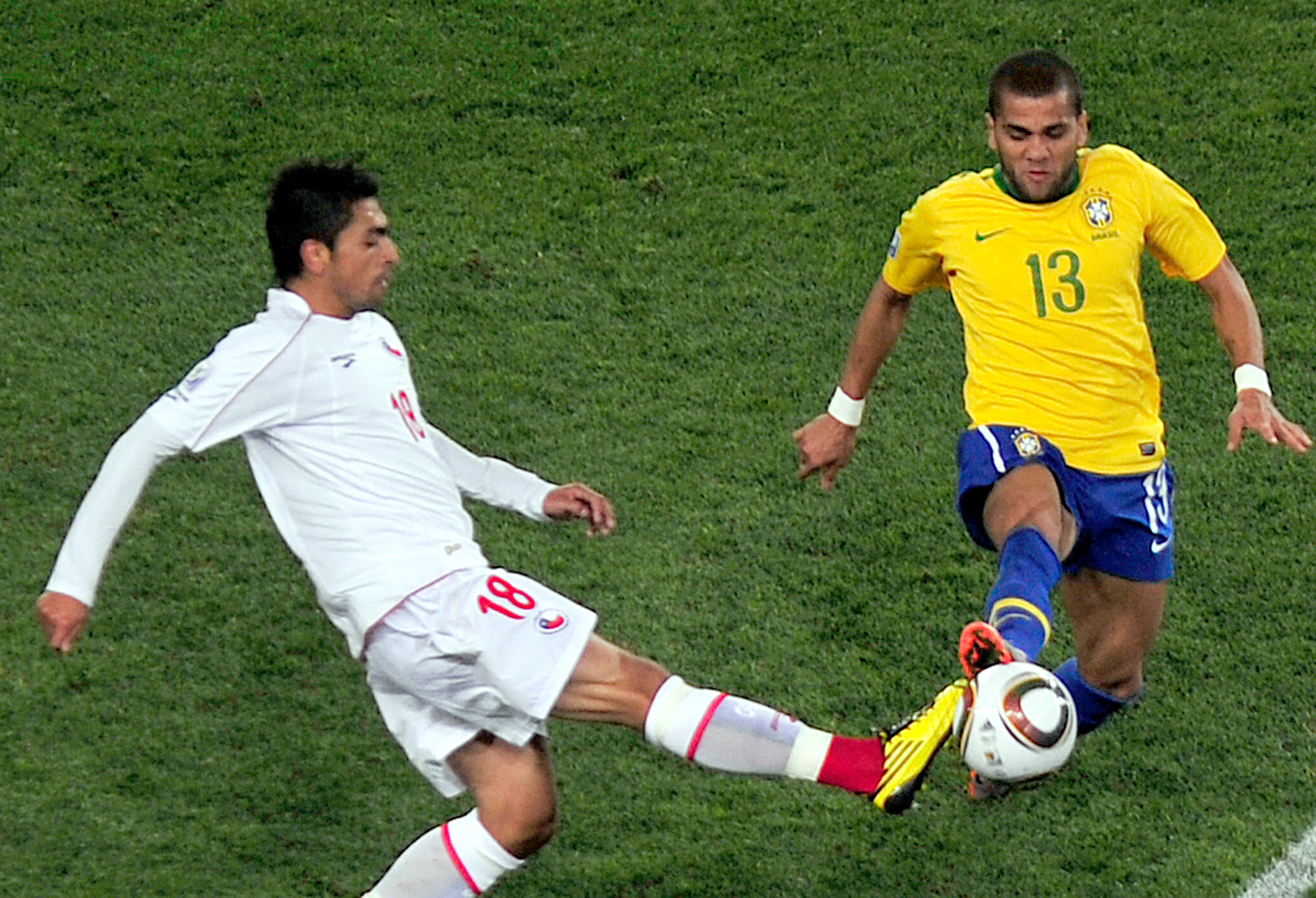
Jara competing for the ball against Brazil's Dani Alves at the 2010 FIFA World Cup

He was chosen by coach Nelson Acosta to play for Chile during their 2006 tour through Europe where they played the Republic of Ireland in Dublin, Ivory Coast in Toulon and Sweden in Stockholm.

He also played for Chile in the 2007 Copa América against Ecuador, Brazil, and Mexico. He scored his first international goal for Chile against Venezuela during the CONMEBOL 2010 World Cup qualifiers, and also played at the final tournament.

In 2013, during a 2014 FIFA World Cup qualifier he provoked Uruguayan Luis Suárez by holding and pinching him around the waist with one hand and grabbing his crotch with the other. Suárez subsequently punched Jara, but both parties went unpunished. At the final tournament, he was the fifth and final Chilean player used in a penalty shoot-out against Brazil in the Round of 16 in Belo Horizonte. His shot missed, rebounding off the right-hand goal post, which eliminated his team from the competition.

In the 2015 Copa América quarter-finals match against Uruguay he provoked Uruguayan Edinson Cavani into a second yellow card and expulsion by slapping Cavani and, according to replays, appeared to insert his finger into Cavani's anus. Jara then faked a fall to the ground. The incident received almost immediate and prominent international coverage from newspapers and the internet, mostly condemning Jara. Massive coverage included articles, columns, blogs, memes, and cartoons accusing Jara of inappropriately touching Cavani and then diving theatrically. Press in Australia likened the incident to the infamous on-field, anus-poking tactics of rugby league player John Hopoate in 2001. Although unpunished during the match, Jara was suspended for two games, the remainder of the tournament, which Chile eventually won. Mainz criticised Jara for the incident and stated that he would be sold.

== Post-retirement ==
Still a player of Coquimbo Unido, in November 2022, Jara joined TNT Sports Chile as a football commentator for the program Todos somos técnicos (We are all coaches) in the context of the 2022 FIFA World Cup, alongside Gustavo Quinteros, Gissella Gallardo and Roberto Tobar. On 4 March 2024, he rejoined TNT Sports Chile.

In October 2024, Jara joined ADN Radio as a panelist of the program Los Tenores de ADN (The Tenors from ADN).

In December 2024, Jara graduated as a football manager at INAF (National Institute of Football, Sports and Physical Activity of Chile). He joined the technical staff of Nicolás Córdova as a guest for the friendly matches of the Chile national team in September and October 2026.

== Career statistics ==
Appearances and goals by national team and year
National team	Year	Apps	Goals
Chile	2006	7	0
Chile	2007	3	0
Chile	2008	9	2
Chile	2009	12	1
Chile	2010	8	0
Chile	2011	12	0
Chile	2012	4	0
Chile	2013	8	0
Chile	2014	10	0
Chile	2015	12	0
Chile	2016	14	0
Chile	2017	11	0
Chile	2018	0	0
Chile	2019	5	0
Total		115	3

Scores and results list Chile's goal tally first, score column indicates score after each Jara goal.

List of international goals scored by Gonzalo Jara
No.	Date	Venue	Opponent	Score	Result	Competition
1	19 June 2008	Estadio Olímpico Luis Ramos, Puerto la Cruz, Venezuela	Venezuela	2–1	3–2	2010 FIFA World Cup qualification
2	10 September 2008	Estadio Nacional de Chile, Santiago, Chile	Colombia	1–0	4–0	2010 FIFA World Cup qualification
3	17 November 2009	Stadium Pod Dubňom, Žilina, Slovakia	Slovakia	1–0	2–1	Friendly

== Honours ==
Colo-Colo

- Chilean Primera División: 2007 Apertura, 2007 Clausura, 2008 Clausura

Universidad de Chile

- Chilean Primera División: 2017 Clausura

Chile

- Copa América: 2015, 2016

== See also ==
- List of footballers with 100 or more caps
