= Lars Stindl =

German association football player

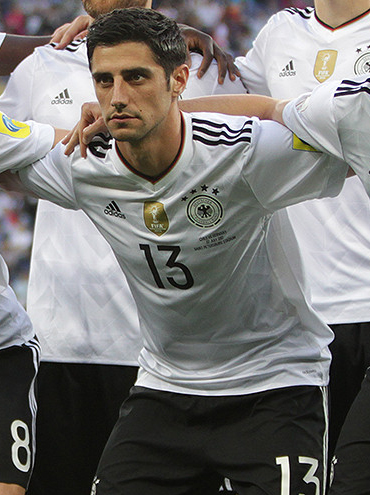
- Stindl lining up for Germany in 2017

Personal information
- Full name: Lars Edi Stindl
- Date of birth: 26 August 1988 (age 38)
- Place of birth: Speyer, West Germany
- Height: 1.81 m (5 ft 11 in)
- Positions: Attacking midfielder; forward

Youth career
- 1991–2000: TSV Wiesental
- 2000–2007: Karlsruher SC

Senior career*
Years	Team	Apps	(Gls)
2007–2010	Karlsruher SC II	49	(11)
2007–2010	Karlsruher SC	56	(13)
2010–2015	Hannover 96	131	(19)
2015–2023	Borussia Mönchengladbach	222	(62)
2023–2024	Karlsruher SC	24	(4)
Total		482	(109)

International career
2007	Germany U20	3	(0)
2009	Germany U21	1	(0)
2017–2018	Germany	11	(4)
Medal record
Men's football
Representing Germany
FIFA Confederations Cup
Winner	2017 Russia
- * Club domestic league appearances and goals

Lars Edi Stindl (born 26 August 1988) is a German former professional footballer who played as an attacking midfielder or forward.

During the span of his career, Stindl had previously played for Karlsruher SC, Hannover 96, and most recognizably Borussia Mönchengladbach. He had also represented the Germany national team. He scored the only goal in the final of the 2017 FIFA Confederations Cup against Chile to ensure Germany's first ever title in the tournament.

== Club career ==
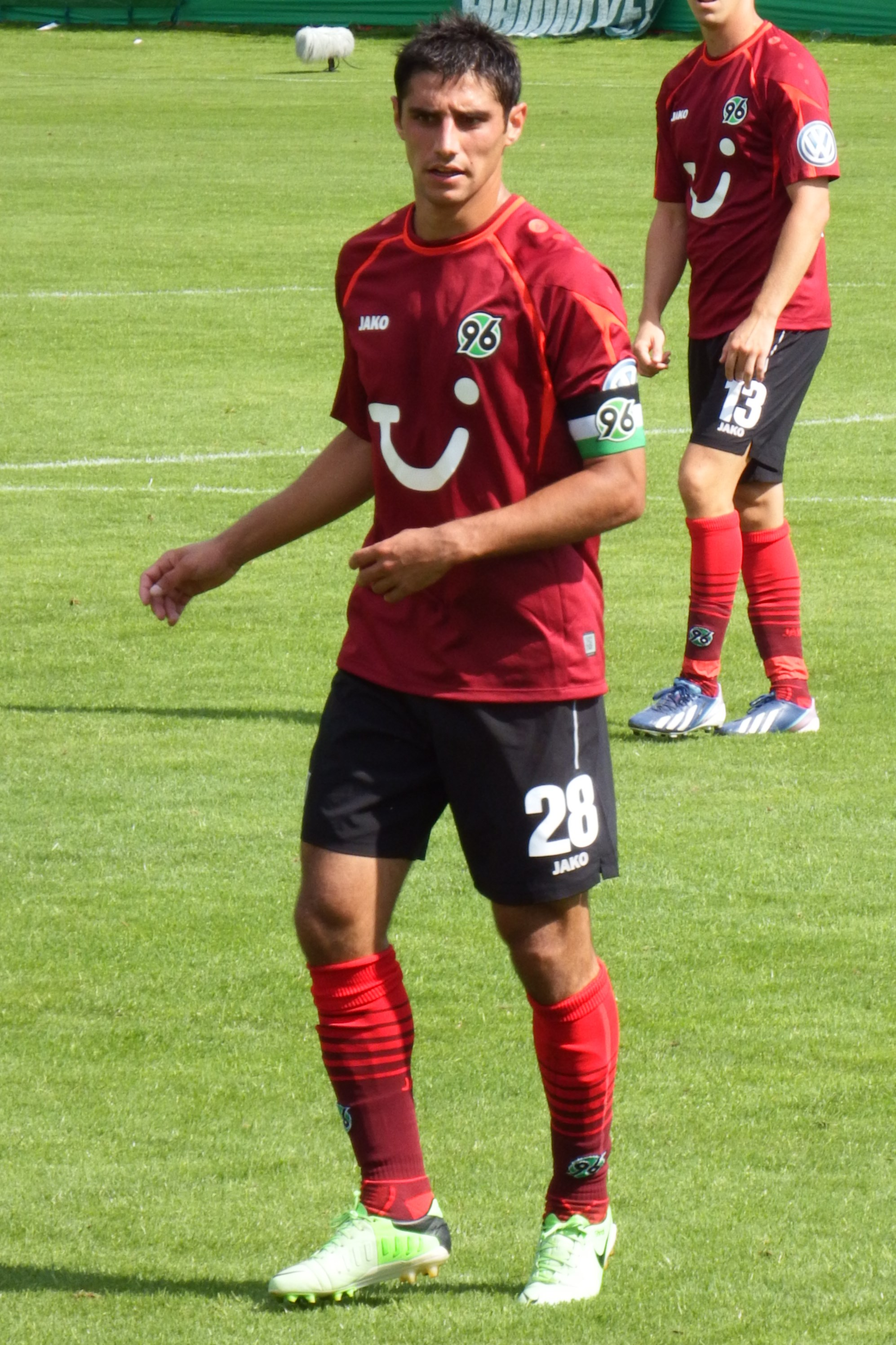
Stindl training with Hannover in 2013

Born in Speyer, Stindl began his career in the youth teams for TSV Wiesental and joined a similar setup at Karlsruher SC in summer 2000. He started his professional career with Karlsruher SC, making his first appearance on 15 March 2008 in the Bundesliga. He was substituted on in the 81st minute in a 1–0 defeat to Eintracht Frankfurt. On 29 November 2008, Stindl scored his first Bundesliga goal against Hannover 96. In February 2010, he announced his intention to leave Karlsruher SC. On 16 March 2010, his transfer to Hannover 96 was confirmed.

On 25 March 2015, it was confirmed that Stindl had signed for Borussia Mönchengladbach on a one-year contract, running for the duration of the 2015–16 season.

On 8 August 2015, he marked his competitive debut by scoring a brace in a 4–1 win at FC St. Pauli in the first round of the 2015–16 DFB-Pokal.

On 1 August 2016, Stindl was confirmed as Gladbach's new captain after the retirement of previous captain Martin Stranzl and the transfer of vice-captain Granit Xhaka to Arsenal.

On 23 February 2017, Stindl scored a hat-trick at ACF Fiorentina's Stadio Artemio Franchi, as Borussia overturned a 3–0 aggregate deficit to qualify for the UEFA Europa League Round of 16.

On 15 December 2020, Stindl scored another hat-trick against Eintracht Frankfurt in the Bundesliga. Two of the goals came after the 90th minute.

In April 2023, Gladbach announced that Stindl would depart the club at the end of the 2022–23 season when his contract would expire, having played eight years for the club and spent seven of those years as the club's captain.

On 28 April 2023, Stindl's former club Karlsruher SC announced that he would rejoin when he left Gladbach, having been absent from the club for 16 years. On 11 August 2023, he scored his first goal for the club since returning in the first round of the DFB-Pokal against 1. FC Saarbrücken. Despite this, his side got knocked out of the competition.

On 28 March 2024, Stindl announced that he would retire from football at the end of the season. He played in more than 430 league matches across both of the first and second division of the German league pyramids.

== International career ==
=== Youth ===
Stindl is a former Germany U20 international and has won one cap for the Germany U21.

=== Senior ===
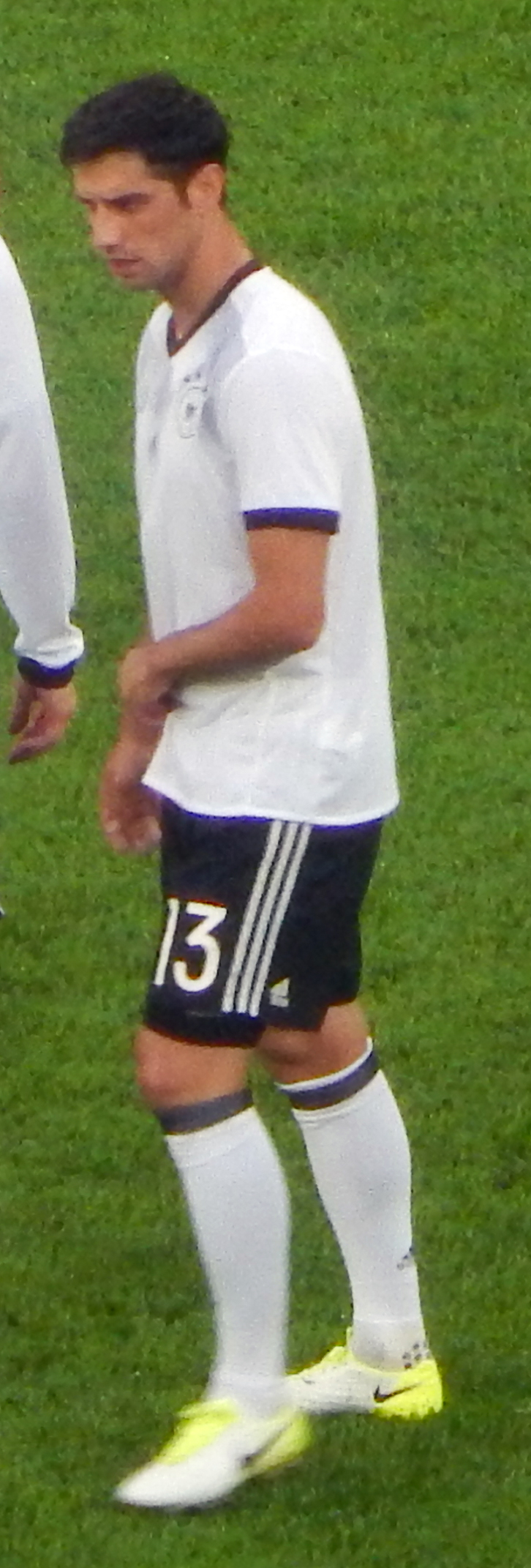
Stindl with Germany during the 2017 Confederations Cup final

Stindl was first called up to the senior national team in May 2017, for the friendly against Denmark on 6 June 2017, for the 2018 World Cup qualification match against San Marino on 10 June 2017 and for the 2017 Confederations Cup to be held from 17 June to 2 July 2017.

Stindl made his international debut on the 6 June match against Denmark, where he started the game and played the full 90 minutes.

In the opening game of the 2017 FIFA Confederations Cup against Australia, Stindl scored his first goal for Germany in the fifth minute of the match. He followed this up with his second international goal in Germany's 1–1 draw with Chile three days later. He repeated the feat against the same opposition in the final of the tournament, scoring the only goal of the match to help Germany claim the title, finishing as joint top goalscorer with three goals.

On 14 November 2017, he scored a vital equaliser in the 90th minute of a friendly against France (which was the last friendly match of Germany in that year and Germans were lagging behind by 1–2), which ensured Germany's unbeaten streak remaining alive in 2017. His eleventh and final appearance for the national team was a 0–1 loss against Brazil in March 2018.

== Career statistics ==
=== Club ===
As of match played 27 May 2023

Appearances and goals by club, season and competition
Club	Season	League			DFB-Pokal		Europe		Total	
Club	Season	Division	Apps	Goals	Apps	Goals	Apps	Goals	Apps	Goals
Karlsruher SC II	2006–07	Regionalliga Süd	12	2	—		—		12	2
Karlsruher SC II	2007–08	Regionalliga Süd	26	4	—		—		26	4
Karlsruher SC II	2008–09	Regionalliga Süd	10	5	—		—		10	5
Karlsruher SC II	2009–10	Regionalliga Süd	1	0	—		—		1	0
Karlsruher SC II	Total		49	11	0	0	0	0	49	11
Karlsruher SC	2007–08	Bundesliga	2	0	0	0	—		2	0
Karlsruher SC	2008–09	Bundesliga	21	4	1	0	—		22	4
Karlsruher SC	2009–10	2. Bundesliga	33	9	2	0	—		35	9
Karlsruher SC	Total		56	13	3	0	0	0	59	13
Hannover 96	2010–11	Bundesliga	33	2	1	0	—		34	2
Hannover 96	2011–12	Bundesliga	28	2	2	2	13 (Note: Appearances in UEFA Europa League)	2	43	6
Hannover 96	2012–13	Bundesliga	18	2	2	0	9	2	29	4
Hannover 96	2013–14	Bundesliga	31	3	2	0	—		33	3
Hannover 96	2014–15	Bundesliga	21	10	1	1	—		22	11
Hannover 96	Total		131	19	8	3	22	4	161	26
Borussia Mönchengladbach	2015–16	Bundesliga	30	7	3	4	6 (Note: Appearances in UEFA Champions League)	3	39	14
Borussia Mönchengladbach	2016–17	Bundesliga	30	11	4	2	10 (Note: Seven appearances and two goals in UEFA Champions League, three appearances and three goals in UEFA Europa League)	5	44	18
Borussia Mönchengladbach	2017–18	Bundesliga	31	6	3	0	—		34	6
Borussia Mönchengladbach	2018–19	Bundesliga	21	3	1	0	—		22	3
Borussia Mönchengladbach	2019–20	Bundesliga	25	9	1	0	4	2	30	11
Borussia Mönchengladbach	2020–21	Bundesliga	30	14	4	1	8	2	42	17
Borussia Mönchengladbach	2021–22	Bundesliga	26	4	3	1	—		29	5
Borussia Mönchengladbach	2022–23	Bundesliga	29	8	2	1	—		31	9
Borussia Mönchengladbach	Total		222	62	21	9	28	12	271	83
Career total			458	105	32	12	50	16	540	133

=== International ===
Appearances and goals by national team and year
National team	Year	Apps	Goals
Germany	2017	10	4
Germany	2018	1	0
Total		11	4

Scores and results list Germany's goal tally first, score column indicates score after each Stindl goal.

List of international goals scored by Lars Stindl
No.	Date	Venue	Opponent	Score	Result	Competition
1	19 June 2017	Fisht Olympic Stadium, Sochi, Russia	Australia	1–0	3–2	2017 FIFA Confederations Cup
2	22 June 2017	Kazan Arena, Kazan, Russia	Chile	1–1	1–1	2017 FIFA Confederations Cup
3	2 July 2017	Krestovsky Stadium, Saint Petersburg, Russia	Chile	1–0	1–0	2017 FIFA Confederations Cup
4	14 November 2017	RheinEnergieStadion, Cologne, Germany	France	2–2	2–2	Friendly

== Honours ==
Germany

- FIFA Confederations Cup: 2017

Individual

- FIFA Confederations Cup Silver Boot: 2017
- Bundesliga Player of the Month: December 2020
