= Néstor Araujo =

Mexican footballer (born 1991)

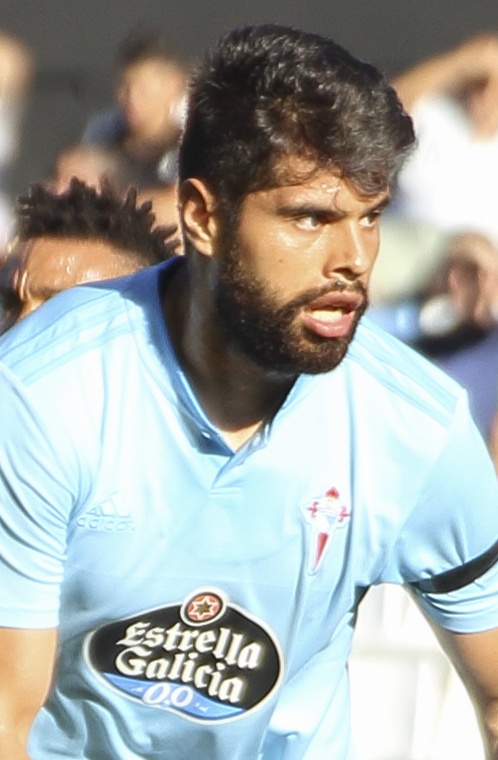
- Araujo with Celta in 2018

Personal information
- Full name: Néstor Alejandro Araujo Razo
- Date of birth: 29 August 1991 (age 35)
- Place of birth: Guadalajara, Jalisco, Mexico
- Height: 1.88 m (6 ft 2 in)
- Position: Centre-back

Team information
- Current team: Chaves
- Number: 14

Youth career
- 2007–2013: Cruz Azul

Senior career*
Years	Team	Apps	(Gls)
2009	Cruz Azul Hidalgo	0	(0)
2010–2014	Cruz Azul	49	(0)
2013–2014	→ Santos Laguna (loan)	29	(0)
2014–2018	Santos Laguna	106	(3)
2018–2022	Celta	133	(4)
2022–2026	América	54	(0)
2026–	Chaves	0	(0)

International career^{‡}
2011	Mexico U20	13	(0)
2011–2012	Mexico U23	18	(0)
2011–2023	Mexico	67	(3)
Medal record
Men's football
Representing Mexico
CONCACAF Gold Cup
Winner	2019 United States	Team
Runner-up	2021 United States	Team
Olympic Games
Gold medal – first place	2012 London	Team
Olympic Qualifying Championship
Winner	2012 United States
Toulon Tournament
Winner	2012 France	Team
Pan American Games
Gold medal – first place	2011 Guadalajara	Team
FIFA U-20 World Cup
Third place	2011 Colombia	Team
CONCACAF U-20 Championship
Winner	2011 Guatemala	Team
- * Club domestic league appearances and goals as of 9 March 2025 ‡ National team caps and goals as of 10 June 2023

Néstor Alejandro Araujo Razo (born 29 August 1991) is a Mexican professional footballer who plays as a centre-back for Liga Portugal 2 club Chaves. He is an Olympic gold medalist.

Araujo began his career with Cruz Azul in 2010, and played with the club for three years before joining Santos Laguna. At Santos, he played in over 100 matches, winning the Liga MX twice. He moved overseas to play for Celta de Vigo, spending four years there before returning to Mexico to join Club América.

He competed internationally since 2011: Araujo played at the 2011 Copa America, 2012 Toulon Tournament, Copa America Centenario, and the 2017 FIFA Confederations Cup. He was on the Mexico team at the 2012 Summer Olympics that won the gold medal.

== Club career ==
=== Cruz Azul ===
Araujo joined Cruz Azul's youth academy in 2007, making his way through the Cruz Azul Premier team and the under-20s. For the Clausura 2009 season, Araujo was registered to Cruz Azul Hidalgo squad, but did not played a single match.

In 2010, Enrique Meza promoted Araujo to the first team. On 19 September, he made his Primera División debut for Cruz Azul, playing 90 minutes in the 3–0 home victory against Querétaro.

=== Santos Laguna ===
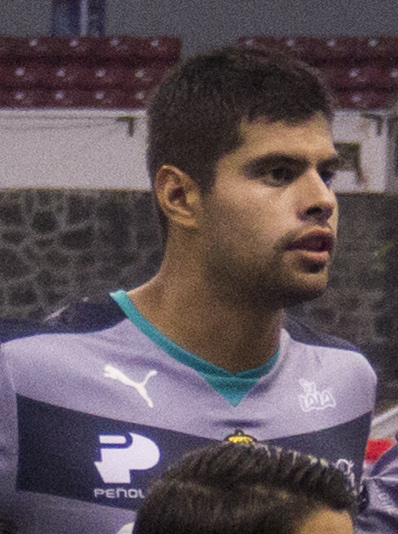
Araujo lining up for Santos Laguna in 2016.

On 5 June 2013, Araujo joined Santos Laguna on a year-long loan deal with an option to buy. He made his league debut on 26 July against his former club Cruz Azul, playing the entire match as Santos earned a 3–2 victory. On 19 August 2014, Araujo scored his first goal for Santos in a 3–0 win over UAT in the Copa MX. He won his first cup with Santos Laguna following their victory over Puebla in the final of the Apertura Copa MX. The following year, Araujo won his first league title as Santos defeated Querétaro in the finals of the Clausura tournament. On 20 July, Santos defeated Club América to win the 2015 Campeón de Campeones cup; Araujo started the match and played all 90 minutes.

In May 2018, Santos Laguna defeated Toluca to win the Clausura tournament following a 3–2 aggregate score in the finals. Araujo missed the finals due to an injury he suffered while on international duty with the Mexico national team.

=== Celta de Vigo ===
On 14 June 2018, Araujo joined Spanish club Celta de Vigo on a five-year contract. On 21 July, he made his debut in a friendly match against Espanyol.

=== América ===
On June 24, 2022, Araujo made his return to Mexico and signed with Club América. In September 2023, he suffered a knee injury and was ruled out for the rest of the season.

== International career ==
Araujo received his first international call up in 2011 during the 2011 Copa America. In his international debut, he scored in a 2–1 loss against Chile during their first group stage match. He would go on to appear in the rest of the group stage matches and Mexico would end up last in the group.

Araujo would be an international regular under Juan Carlos Osorio, participating in various friendlies, the CONCACAF 2018 FIFA World Cup qualifiers, the Copa America Centenario, and the 2017 FIFA Confederations Cup.

On 27 March 2018, during a friendly match against Croatia, Araujo was forced off the pitch after 15 minutes when suffering an knee injury. He was sidelined since then, however in May he was named in Mexico's preliminary 28-man squad for the World Cup in Russia but had to withdraw due to experiencing tendonitis during his recovery.

Araujo was part of the squad that won the 2019 CONCACAF Gold Cup.

In October 2022, Araujo was named in Mexico's preliminary 31-man squad for the 2022 FIFA World Cup, and in November, he was ultimately included in the final 26-man roster.

== Personal life ==
Néstor has an older brother, Félix, who is also a professional footballer.

== Career statistics ==
=== Club ===
As of match played on 9 March 2024

Appearances and goals by club, season and competition
Club	Season	League			Cup (Note: Includes Copa MX, Copa del Rey)		Continental		Other		Total	
Club	Season	Division	Apps	Goals	Apps	Goals	Apps	Goals	Apps	Goals	Apps	Goals
Cruz Azul	2010–11	Liga MX	17	0	—		2 (Note: Appearances in CONCACAF Champions League)	0	—		19	0
Cruz Azul	2011–12	Liga MX	24	0	—		5 (Note: Appearances in Copa Libertadores)	0	—		29	0
Cruz Azul	2012–13	Liga MX	8	0	10	0	—		—		18	0
Cruz Azul	Total		49	0	10	0	7	0	—		66	0
Santos Laguna (loan)	2013–14	Liga MX	29	0	2	0	4	0	—		35	0
Santos Laguna	2014–15	Liga MX	16	0	10	2	—		1 (Note: Appearance in Campeón de Campeones)	0	27	2
Santos Laguna	2015–16	Liga MX	36	1	—		8	0	—		44	1
Santos Laguna	2016–17	Liga MX	28	2	5	1	—		—		33	3
Santos Laguna	2017–18	Liga MX	26	0	5	1	—		—		31	1
Santos Laguna	Total		106	3	20	4	8	0	1	0	135	7
Celta	2018–19	La Liga	32	3	1	0	—		—		33	3
Celta	2019–20	La Liga	34	1	2	0	—		—		36	1
Celta	2020–21	La Liga	33	0	—		—		—		33	0
Celta	2021–22	La Liga	34	0	—		—		—		34	0
Celta	Total		133	4	3	0	—		—		136	4
América	2022–23	Liga MX	29	0	—		—		—		29	0
América	2023–24	Liga MX	6	0	—		—		4 (Note: Appearances in Leagues Cup)	0	10	0
América	2024–25	Liga MX	0	0	—		0	0	—		0	0
América	Total		35	0	—		0	0	4	0	39	0
Career total			352	7	35	4	19	0	5	0	411	11

=== International ===
As of match played on 10 June 2023

Appearances and goals by national team and year
National team	Year	Apps	Goals
Mexico	2011	3	1
Mexico	2016	8	0
Mexico	2017	13	2
Mexico	2018	5	0
Mexico	2019	8	0
Mexico	2020	4	0
Mexico	2021	14	0
Mexico	2022	9	0
Mexico	2023	3	0
Total		67	3

Scores and results list Mexico's goal tally first, score column indicates score after each Araujo goal.

List of international goals scored by Néstor Araujo
No.	Date	Venue	Opponent	Score	Result	Competition
1	4 July 2011	Estadio del Bicentenario, San Juan, Argentina	Chile	1–0	1–2	2011 Copa América
2	24 March 2017	Estadio Azteca, Mexico City, Mexico	Costa Rica	2–0	2–0	2018 FIFA World Cup qualification
3	24 June 2017	Kazan Arena, Kazan, Russia	Russia	1–1	2–1	2017 FIFA Confederations Cup

== Honours ==
Cruz Azul

- Copa MX: Clausura 2013

Santos Laguna

- Liga MX: Clausura 2015, Clausura 2018
- Copa MX: Apertura 2014
- Campeón de Campeones: 2015

América

- Liga MX: Apertura 2023, Clausura 2024, Apertura 2024
- Campeón de Campeones: 2024
- Supercopa de la Liga MX: 2024
- Campeones Cup: 2024

Mexico U20

- CONCACAF U-20 Championship: 2011

Mexico U23

- Pan American Games: 2011
- Toulon Tournament: 2012
- CONCACAF Olympic Qualifying Championship: 2012
- Olympic Gold Medal: 2012

Mexico

- CONCACAF Gold Cup: 2019

Individual

- Liga MX Best XI: Clausura 2017
- Liga MX Best Defender: 2016–17
- CONCACAF Nations League Finals Best XI: 2021
