= Martín Rodríguez (footballer, born 1994) =

Chilean footballer (born 1994)

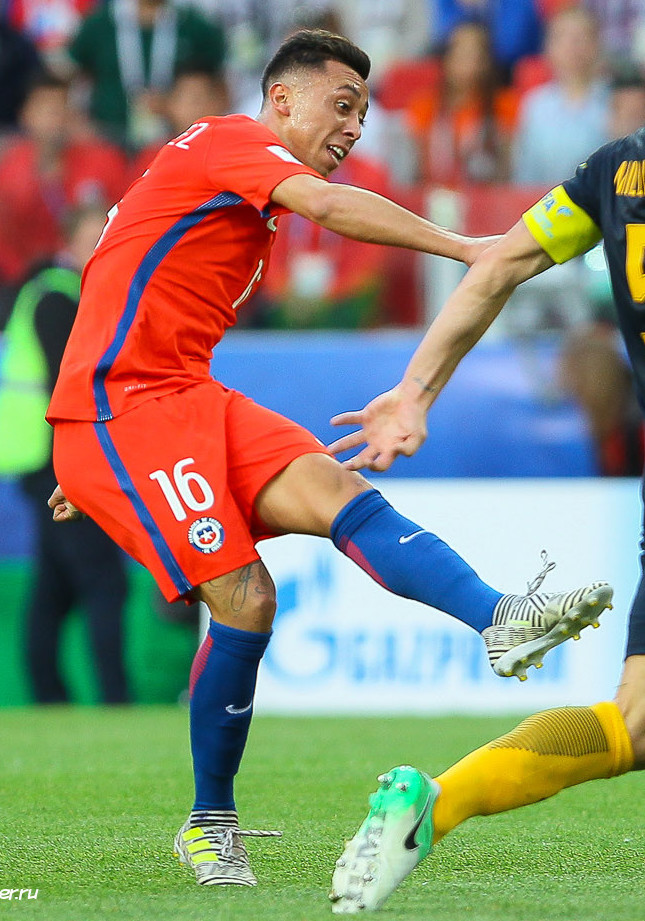
- Rodríguez with Chile at the 2017 FIFA Confederations Cup

Personal information
- Full name: Martín Vladimir Rodríguez Torrejón
- Date of birth: 5 August 1994 (age 32)
- Place of birth: Diego de Almagro, Chile
- Height: 1.71 m (5 ft 7 in)
- Position: Midfielder

Team information
- Current team: Erzurumspor
- Number: 65

Youth career
- 2008–2013: Huachipato

Senior career*
Years	Team	Apps	(Gls)
2011–2015	Huachipato	48	(4)
2015–2016	Colo-Colo	35	(9)
2017–2019	Cruz Azul	40	(4)
2018–2019	→ UNAM (loan)	36	(3)
2019–2021	UNAM	3	(0)
2020	→ Morelia (loan)	10	(3)
2020	→ Mazatlán (loan)	17	(0)
2021	Colo-Colo	8	(0)
2021–2022	Altay	29	(3)
2022–2024	D.C. United	39	(2)
2025	Ñublense	10	(0)
2025–	Erzurumspor	31	(6)

International career^{‡}
2013	Chile U20	12	(3)
2014–2018	Chile	12	(1)
Medal record
Representing Chile
Runner-up	FIFA Confederations Cup	2017
- * Club domestic league appearances and goals as of 5 May 2026 ‡ National team caps and goals as of 11 September 2018

Martín Vladimir Rodríguez Torrejón (born 5 August 1994) is a Chilean professional footballer who plays as a midfielder for Turkish Süper Lig club Erzurumspor.

== Club career ==
In June 2022, Rodríguez signed with American club D.C. United.

Moving back to Chile, Rodríguez joined Ñublense in February 2025. He left them in August of the same year.

Back to Turkey after his stint with Altay in 2021-22, Rodríguez joined Erzurumspor in the TFF 1. Lig on 17 August 2025 on a deal for a season.

=== Seven-a-side football ===
Still a player of D.C. United, Rodríguez joined the Chilean seven-a-side football club Red Lions in November 2023 for the championship Legends Cup, with the also footballer Brayan Véjar as coach.

== Career statistics ==
=== Club ===
As of 28 October 2024

Appearances and goals by club, season and competition
Club	Season	League			National Cup		Continental		Other		Total	
Club	Season	Division	Apps	Goals	Apps	Goals	Apps	Goals	Apps	Goals	Apps	Goals
Huachipato	2011	Chilean Primera División	2	0	1	1	—		—		3	1
Huachipato	2012	Chilean Primera División	6	0	2	0	—		—		8	0
Huachipato	2013	Chilean Primera División	1	0	3	0	1 (Note: Appearance(s) in Copa Libertadores)	0	—		5	0
Huachipato	2013–14	Chilean Primera División	13	2	—		—		—		13	2
Huachipato	2014–15	Chilean Primera División	26	2	—		6 (Note: Appearance(s) in Copa Sudamericana)	0	—		32	2
Huachipato	Total		48	4	6	1	7	0	—		71	5
Colo-Colo	2015–16	Chilean Primera División	22	4	9	2	5	0	—		36	6
Colo-Colo	2016–17	Chilean Primera División	13	5	8	2	—		—		21	7
Colo-Colo	Total		35	9	17	4	5	0	—		57	13
Cruz Azul	2016–17	Liga MX	14	1	7	1	—		—		21	2
Cruz Azul	2017–18	Liga MX	26	3	4	1	—		—		30	4
Cruz Azul	Total		40	4	11	2	—		—		51	6
UNAM (loan)	2018–19	Liga MX	36	3	8	2	—		—		44	5
UNAM	2019–20	Liga MX	3	0	4	0	—		—		7	0
Morelia (loan)	2019–20	Liga MX	10	3	3	1	—		—		13	4
Mazatlán (loan)	2020–21	Liga MX	17	0	—		—		—		17	0
Colo-Colo	2021	Chilean Primera División	8	0	4	2	—		1 (Note: Appearance(s) in Supercopa de Chile)	0	13	2
Altay	2021–22	Süper Lig	29	3	2	0	—		—		31	3
D.C. United	2022	MLS	14	0	—		—		—		14	0
D.C. United	2023	MLS	0	0	0	0	—		—		0	0
D.C. United	2024	MLS	25	2	—		2 (Note: Appearance(s) in Leagues Cup)	0	—		27	2
D.C. United	Total		39	2	0	0	2	0	—		41	2
Career Total			265	28	54	12	14	0	1	0	334	40

=== International ===
As of match played 25 August 2024

Appearances and goals by national team and year
National team	Year	Apps	Goals
Chile	2014	1	0
Chile	2017	7	1
Chile	2018	4	0
Total		12	1

Scores and results list Chile's goal tally first, score column indicates score after each Rodríguez goal.

List of international goals scored by Martin Rodríguez
No.	Date	Venue	Opponent	Score	Result	Competition	Ref.
1	25 June 2017	Spartak Stadium, Moscow, Russia	Australia	1–1	1–1	2017 FIFA Confederations Cup	

== Personal life ==
He is nicknamed Tin Rodríguez.

== Honours ==
Huachipato

- Primera División (1): 2012–C

Colo-Colo

- Primera División (1): 2015–A
- Copa Chile (1): 2016
