= Croatia–Serbia basketball rivalry =

International basketball rivalry

- Croatia Serbia
- Sport: Basketball
- Location: Europe (FIBA Europe)
- First meeting: 30 June 1997; EuroBasket; Croatia 62, FR Yugoslavia 64
- Latest meeting: 17 August 2016; Summer Olympics; Croatia 83, Serbia 86

Statistics
- Total meetings: 13 meetings
- Most wins: Serbia (.846)
- All-time record: Serbia, 11–2
- Largest victory: 3 August 2012; Ex-Yu Cup; Croatia 74, Serbia 90
- Smallest victory: 4 September 2010; FIBA World Championship; Serbia 73, Croatia 72
- Largest goal scoring: 17 August 2016; Summer Olympics; Croatia 83, Serbia 86
- Current win streak: Serbia, 5

Croatia	Serbia

The Croatia–Serbia basketball rivalry is a competitive sports rivalry that exists between the national basketball teams of the two countries and their respective sets of fans.

== History ==
The big rivalry in basketball started at the FIBA European Championship in 1995, in Athens. At the time, Croatia was a newly independent state, while Serbia was a federal unit of FR Yugoslavia. Both countries did well in the tournament, with Yugoslavia ranking first. The third-place Croatian team caused an international scandal when they walked off the medal stand and out of the arena just before Serbs and Montenegrins were about to receive their gold medals. Curiously, there hasn't been a single direct game involving the two countries over the course of the championship.

Croatia and Yugoslavia did face each other in a game at EuroBasket 1997. Four seconds before the end of the tense game, Croatian team was leading by two points when Serbian guard Aleksandar Đorđević took the ball and made a three-pointer, winning the game for Yugoslavia. Yugoslavia went on to win the championship, while Croatia ended up ranking 11th overall.

Afterward, at EuroBasket 2001, Croats were heavily beaten by 80–66.

Serbia defeated Croatia, 86–83, in the last quarterfinal of the Olympic Basketball Tournament on 17 August 2016 to set up a semifinal clash with Australia. On 19 August, Serbia cruised to a resounding 87–61 win over Australia. Serbia won the silver medal following a 96–66 lost to the United States in the final, while Croatia finished at 5th place.

== Head-to-head ==
=== EuroBasket 1997 ===
30 June 1997
22:30

Boxscore

Croatia	62–64	FR Yugoslavia
Scoring by half: 31–22, 31–42
Pts: Slaven Rimac 22; Rebs: Davor Pejčinović 7 Asts: Slaven Rimac 4		Pts: Aleksandar Đorđević 19; Rebs: Željko Rebrača 8 Asts: Đorđević, Obradović 3

Palau Municipal d'Esports de Badalona, Badalona
Attendance: 4,500
Referees: Nikolaos Pitsilkas (GRE), Romualdas Brazauskas (LTU)

Boxscore

Starters:			Pts	Reb	Ast
PG	8	Vladan Alanović	4	3	1
G	9	Slaven Rimac	22	3	4
F	15	Davor Marcelić	3	2	0
PF	13	Nikola Prkačin	8	5	1
F/C	12	Siniša Kelečević	8	4	1
Reserves:					
G	4	Josip Sesar	5	0	1
PG	5	Damir Mulaomerović	9	0	1
G	6	Gordan Giriček	DNP		
PG	7	Damir Milačić	DNP		
C	10	Emilio Kovačić	0	2	0
C	11	Davor Pejčinović	3	7	2
C	14	Ivan Grgat	DNP		
Head coach:
Petar Skansi

CRO	YUG

CRO	Statistics	YUG
13/39 (33%)	2-pt field goals	16/36 (44%)
4/10 (40%)	3-pt field goals	4/11 (36%)
24/27 (89%)	Free throws	20/33 (61%)
6	Offensive rebounds	8
20	Defensive rebounds	19
26	Total rebounds	27
11	Assists	9
10	Turnovers	10
9	Steals	9
0	Blocks	0
30	Fouls	25

Starters:			Pts	Reb	Ast
PG	10	Aleksandar Đorđević	19	2	3
SG	9	Miroslav Berić	0	0	0
SF	4	Dejan Bodiroga	10	5	2
PF	13	Zoran Savić	2	4	1
C	11	Željko Rebrača	5	8	0
Reserves:					
SG	5	Predrag Danilović	DNP		
PG	6	Saša Obradović	7	1	3
SF	7	Nikola Lončar	5	0	0
SG	8	Miroslav Radošević	DNP		
C	12	Nikola Bulatović	10	5	0
PF	14	Dejan Tomašević	0	1	0
PF	15	Milenko Topić	6	1	0
Head coach:
Željko Obradović

=== 2000 Trofeo Lido delle Rose in Roseto, Italy ===
19 August 2000
19:00

Croatia	69–80	FR Yugoslavia
Scoring by half: 37–39, 32–41
Pts: Damir Mulaomerović 26; Rebs: not available Asts: not available		Pts: Dejan Bodiroga 20; Rebs: not available Asts: not available

PalaMaggetti, Roseto degli Abruzzi
Attendance: 2,000
Referees: Luigi Lamonica (ITA), Marco Giansanti (ITA)

Boxscore

Croatia

- Roster: Damir Mulaomerović (26), Vladimir Krstić (0), Josip Sesar (15), Davor Kus (dnp), Slaven Rimac (11), Matej Mamić (5), Jurica Ružić (2), Sandro Nicević (2), Mate Skelin (dnp), Nikola Vujčić (6), Žan Tabak (2)
- Starters: Mulaomerović, Sesar, Mamić, Nicević, Tabak
- Head coach: Aleksandar Petrović

(Serbia and Montenegro) Yugoslavia

- Roster: Dejan Bodiroga (20), Predrag Danilović (13), Saša Obradović (2), Nikola Lončar (0), Marko Jarić (0), Igor Rakočević (7), Dragan Lukovski (7), Željko Rebrača (10), Dragan Tarlać (6), Dejan Milojević (0), Dejan Tomašević (13), Milan Gurović (2)
- Starters: Danilović, Obradović, Lončar, Tomašević, Rebrača
- Head coach: Željko Obradović

Number in parentheses indicates points scored in the game.

=== EuroBasket 2001 ===
31 August 2001
19:00 TT

Boxscore

Croatia	66–80	FR Yugoslavia
Scoring by quarter: 20–26, 15–17, 20–18, 11–19
Pts: Emilio Kovačić 19; Rebs: Emilio Kovačić 8 Asts: Damir Mulaomerović 5		Pts: Predrag Stojaković 21; Rebs: Dragan Tarlać 9 Asts: Marko Jarić 4

Antalya Expo Center, Antalya
Attendance: 2,500
Referees: Romualdas Brazauskas (LTU), Petr Sudek (SVK)

Boxscore

Starters:			Pts	Reb	Ast
PG	4	Damir Mulaomerović	12	1	5
G	10	Gordan Giriček	17	3	1
G/F	7	Veljko Mršić	0	0	1
C	11	Emilio Kovačić	19	8	0
C	15	Žan Tabak	4	4	1
Reserves:					
SG	5	Josip Vranković	DNP		
G	6	Josip Sesar	2	4	0
PF	8	Nikola Prkačin	6	2	1
PG	9	Vladimir Krstić	0	0	0
C	12	Mate Skelin	4	5	0
SF	13	Matej Mamić	0	2	1
F/C	14	Nikola Vujčić	2	1	0
Head coach:
Aleksandar Petrović

CRO	YUG

CRO	Statistics	YUG
22/41 (54%)	2-pt field goals	26/55 (47%)
4/17 (24%)	3-pt field goals	5/20 (25%)
10/13 (77%)	Free throws	12/21 (62%)
6	Offensive rebounds	12
24	Defensive rebounds	24
30	Total rebounds	26
10	Assists	9
7	Turnovers	3
1	Steals	9
3	Blocks	2
12	Fouls	18

Starters:			Pts	Reb	Ast
PG	10	Marko Jarić	9	1	4
G/F	15	Milan Gurović	9	1	2
SF	8	Predrag Stojaković	21	2	0
PF	14	Dejan Tomašević	13	8	1
C	11	Predrag Drobnjak	2	7	0
Reserves:					
G/F	4	Dejan Bodiroga	9	0	0
G/F	5	Veselin Petrović	DNP		
PG	6	Saša Obradović	6	4	0
PG	7	Igor Rakočević	DNP		
SG	9	Vlado Šćepanović	8	4	1
C	12	Dragan Tarlać	3	9	1
PF	13	Dejan Milojević	DNP		
Head coach:
Svetislav Pešić

=== 2005 ProMonte Supercup in Podgorica ===
25 August 2005
21:00

Report

Serbia and Montenegro	74–71	Croatia
Scoring by quarter: 19–19, 23–23, 12–16, 20–13
Pts: Nenad Krstić 16; Rebs: not available Asts: not available		Pts: Gordan Giriček 20; Rebs: not available Asts: not available

Morača Sports Center, Podgorica
Attendance: 4,120
Referees: Milivoje Jovčić (SCG), Milija Vojinović (SCG), Tomas Jasevičius (LTU)

Boxscore

Serbia and Montenegro

- Roster: Dejan Bodiroga (11), Aleksandar Pavlović (4), Vule Avdalović (0), Vladimir Radmanović (2), Igor Rakočević (12), Vlado Šćepanović (2), Marko Jarić (9), Bojan Popović (dnp), Nenad Krstić (16), Dejan Milojević (11), Darko Miličić (3), Milan Gurović (4)
- Starters: Avdalović, Pavlović, Gurović, Milojević, Krstić
- Head coach: Željko Obradović

Croatia

- Roster: Roko Ukić (9), Marino Baždarić (0), Marko Popović (0), Nikola Vujčić (1), Nikola Prkačin (0), Andrija Žižić (5), Gordan Giriček (20), Zoran Planinić (8), Marko Tomas (8), Matej Mamić (0), Dalibor Bagarić (0), Mario Kasun (9)
- Starters: Planinić, Giriček, Mamić, Vujčić, Bagarić
- Head coach: Neven Spahija

Number in parentheses indicates points scored in the game.

=== 2007 Trofeo Diego Gianatti in Bormio, Italy ===
3 August 2007
16:00

Croatia	84–76	Serbia
Scoring by quarter: 19–22, 14–20, 27–21, 24–13
Pts: Mario Kasun 16; Rebs: Mario Kasun 10; Asts: Zoran Planinić 5		Pts: Milan Gurović 21; Rebs: not available Asts: not available

Pentagono Hall, Bormio
Attendance: 300
Referees: Roberto Begnis (ITA), Marcello Reatto (ITA), Sergio Borroni (ITA)

Boxscore

Croatia

- Roster: Roko Ukić (0), Davor Kus (11), Marko Popović (13), Marino Baždarić (0), Nikola Prkačin (7), Marko Tomas (6), Zoran Planinić (7), Mario Stojić (dnp), Damir Markota (0), Marko Banić (9), Mario Kasun (16), Stanko Barać (10), Marin Rozić (5), Jure Lalić (0)
- Starters: N/A
- Head coach: Jasmin Repeša

Serbia

- Roster: Miloš Teodosić (2), Branko Cvetković (4), Vuk Radivojević (0), Zoran Erceg (16), Dragan Labović (11), Mile Ilić (0), Marko Jarić (9), Darko Miličić (11), Nemanja Aleksandrov (0), Aleksandar Rašić (0), Milenko Tepić (2), Milan Gurović (21), Stefan Marković (0), Nenad Mišanović (0), Novica Veličković (0)
- Starters: Jarić, Radivojević, Cvetković, Erceg, Miličić
- Head coach: Zoran Slavnić

Number in parentheses indicates points scored in the game.

=== 2010 FIBA World Championship ===
External videos
- Srbija - Hrvatska 73:72 HRT komentator 2010 on YouTube (4:19)

The first eighth-final round match-up pitted two former Yugoslav republics against each other as Group A winner Serbia met Group B fourth-place finisher Croatia, the first meeting for the teams in a major international tournament. Serbia prevailed 73–72 in a back-and-forth battle that neither team led by more than eight points at any point during the game. Milan Mačvan, Serbia's youngest player at age 20, drained a three-pointer to extend Serbia's lead to 64–57 with 4:24 remaining before Croatia began a late comeback to pull within one at 68–67 with 24 seconds left in the game. Aleksandar Rašić hit two free throws to extend the lead to three with 21 seconds left before Croatia's Marko Popović answered with two free throws of his own with 15 seconds left. Marko Tomas then stole the ensuing inbounds pass and dished to Popović, who was fouled with 11 seconds left. Popović made only one of two free throws to tie the game at 70 and set up a dramatic finish.

Serbia freed Rašić with a screen on the ensuing inbounds pass and he made an uncontested layup with nine seconds left. Popović was then fouled with 5.9 seconds left, and hit both free throws to tie the game at 72. Serbia inbounded the ball to Rašić, who drove downcourt and was fouled by Croatia's Davor Kus while attempting an off-balance shot with one second left. Rašić made the first and missed the second free throw to give Serbia a one-point victory. Rašić ended up with 15 points, including eight in the fourth quarter and five in the final 21 seconds. Croatia's Popović led all scorers with 21 points to go along with five rebounds and five assists. The Oklahoma City Thunder's Nenad Krstić scored a team-high 16 points for Serbia.

4 September 2010
18:00

Boxscore

Serbia	73–72	Croatia
Scoring by quarter: 19–27, 15–9, 20–14, 19–22
Pts: Nenad Krstić 16; Rebs: Milenko Tepić 7 Asts: Milenko Tepić 4		Pts: Marko Popović 21; Rebs: Ante Tomić 8 Asts: Marko Popović 5

Sinan Erdem Dome, Istanbul
Attendance: 15,000
Referees: Cristiano Jesus Maranho (BRA), Anthony Dewayne Jordan (USA), Scott Jason Butler (AUS)

Boxscore

Starters:			Pts	Reb	Ast
G	6	Aleksandar Rašić	15	1	3
G	4	Miloš Teodosić	3	2	2
F	8	Nemanja Bjelica	3	1	0
PF	14	Novica Veličković	7	2	0
C	12	Nenad Krstić	16	3	1
Reserves:					
G/F	5	Milenko Tepić	2	7	4
SG	7	Ivan Paunić	2	0	0
G	9	Stefan Marković	2	3	2
PF	10	Duško Savanović	0	1	2
SF	11	Marko Kešelj	5	3	0
C	13	Kosta Perović	10	3	0
PF	15	Milan Mačvan	8	1	0
Head coach:
Dušan Ivković

SRB	CRO

SER	Statistics	CRO
20/38 (53%)	2-pt field goals	21/38 (55%)
5/15 (33%)	3-pt field goals	5/24 (21%)
18/25 (72%)	Free throws	15/17 (88%)
7	Offensive rebounds	13
22	Defensive rebounds	23
29	Total rebounds	36
14	Assists	12
12	Turnovers	13
9	Steals	7
0	Blocks	3
14	Fouls	22

Starters:			Pts	Reb	Ast
PG	4	Roko Ukić	11	4	4
G/F	9	Marko Tomas	6	6	1
G/F	7	Bojan Bogdanović	9	3	1
F/C	13	Marko Banić	10	7	1
C	11	Ante Tomić	6	8	0
Reserves:					
G	5	Davor Kus	0	0	0
G	6	Marko Popović	21	5	5
PG	8	Rok Stipčević	DNP		
G	10	Zoran Planinić	DNP		
F/C	12	Krešimir Lončar	9	2	0
C	14	Luka Žorić	DNP		
C	15	Lukša Andrić	DNP		
Head coach:
Josip Vranković

=== 2011 Adecco Ex-Yu Cup in Ljubljana, Slovenia ===
External videos
- Srbija - Hrvatska 80:71 Adeko Ex Yu kup finale 09.08.2011. poslednja cetvrtina on YouTube (30:03)

The 2011 game was a part of exhibition tournament for the EuroBasket 2011. Serbia had an 80–71 win over Croatia in the tournament final on 9 August. Croatia led for most of the game, seven minutes before the end of the game it reached the 10 points margin, 67–57, but then played very poorly in the game closure. With a 13–0 run, Serbia took the lead, 67–70, two minutes before the end, and then increased its advantage to the final nine point lead, 71–80, by the end of the game. Croatia was led by forward Bojan Bogdanović with 17 points, while center Nenad Krstić was the most efficient in Serbia with 18 points scored.

9 August 2011
21:00 CEST

Croatia	71–80	Serbia
Scoring by quarter: 21–18, 18–20, 21–15, 11–27
Pts: Bojan Bogdanović 17; Rebs: Ante Tomić 14; Asts: Dontaye Draper 5		Pts: Duško Savanović 17; Rebs: Nenad Krstić 8 Asts: Miloš Teodosić 6

Arena Stožice, Ljubljana
Attendance: 7,000
Referees: Fernando Rocha (POR), Antonio Conde (SPA), Carmelo Paternico (ITA)

Boxscore

Starters:			Pts	Reb	Ast
G	6	Marko Popović	5	2	2
G/F	12	Krunoslav Simon	10	2	3
G/F	9	Marko Tomas	7	3	0
PF	13	Damir Markota	4	4	2
C	21	Stanko Barać	11	2	0
Reserves:					
C	4	Ante Tomić	13	14	2
G/F	7	Bojan Bogdanović	17	2	0
PG	8	Rok Stipčević	0	0	1
PG	10	Dontaye Draper	4	1	5
C	14	Luka Žorić	0	5	1
C	15	Lukša Andrić	DNP		
F	20	Damjan Rudež	0	0	0
Head coach:
Josip Vranković

CRO	SRB

CRO	Statistics	SER
24/47 (51%)	2-pt field goals	22/38 (58%)
3/13 (23%)	3-pt field goals	5/22 (23%)
14/18 (78%)	Free throws	21/26 (81%)
9	Offensive rebounds	7
26	Defensive rebounds	19
35	Total rebounds	26
16	Assists	17
16	Turnovers	10
8	Steals	8
2	Blocks	1
27	Fouls	22

Starters:			Pts	Reb	Ast
G	4	Miloš Teodosić	4	1	6
SG	10	Uroš Tripković	6	3	1
G/F	5	Milenko Tepić	12	5	1
PF	15	Milan Mačvan	6	4	0
C	12	Nenad Krstić	16	8	0
Reserves:					
G	6	Aleksandar Rašić	5	1	4
G	9	Stefan Marković	10	1	2
SF	11	Marko Kešelj	0	0	0
C	13	Kosta Perović	4	0	1
PF	20	Duško Savanović	17	3	2
C	22	Boban Marjanović	DNP		
SG	23	Dragan Milosavljević	DNP		
Head coach:
Dušan Ivković

=== 2011 London Invitational ===
Croatia national team was able to successfully open its London Tournament campaign with the initial 83–71 win over rival Serbia. Croatia took the lead just before the end of the first quarter (17–16), led at the half by 44–36 and reached 16-point surplus midway the last quarter before managing to stay on the top. Croatian guard Krunoslav Simon again displayed his excellent shooting stroke while leading the Croatia with 17 points (6–8 from the floor). Croatian center Ante Tomić added 13 points and 9 rebounds.

16 August 2011
18:00

Boxscore

Serbia	71–83	Croatia
Scoring by quarter: 19–20, 17–24, 16–18, 19–21
Pts: Miloš Teodosić 18; Rebs: Krstić, Teodosić 5 Asts: Miloš Teodosić 4		Pts: Krunoslav Simon 17; Rebs: Ante Tomić 9 Asts: Rok Stipčević 3

Basketball Arena, London
Attendance: 2,037
Referees: Vicente Bulto (SPA), Mastre (FRA), Robert Lottermoser (GER)

Boxscore

Starters:			Pts	Reb	Ast
G	4	Miloš Teodosić	18	5	4
G	6	Aleksandar Rašić	8	1	2
G/F	5	Milenko Tepić	6	1	2
PF	15	Milan Mačvan	10	3	0
C	12	Nenad Krstić	10	5	0
Reserves:					
SG	7	Ivan Paunić	0	1	0
G	9	Stefan Marković	5	3	2
SG	10	Uroš Tripković	5	0	1
SF	11	Marko Kešelj	3	0	0
C	13	Kosta Perović	2	4	0
PF	20	Duško Savanović	4	4	0
C	22	Boban Marjanović	0	1	0
Head coach:
Dušan Ivković

SRB	CRO

SER	Statistics	CRO
19/38 (50%)	2-pt field goals	21/38 (55%)
7/21 (33%)	3-pt field goals	5/24 (21%)
12/24 (50%)	Free throws	15/17 (88%)
12	Offensive rebounds	13
19	Defensive rebounds	23
31	Total rebounds	36
11	Assists	12
16	Turnovers	13
3	Steals	7
1	Blocks	3
27	Fouls	22

Starters:			Pts	Reb	Ast
Reserves:					
C	4	Ante Tomić	11	9	2
PG	5	Marko Car	DNP		
G	6	Marko Popović	3	1	1
G/F	7	Bojan Bogdanović	7	2	1
PG	8	Rok Stipčević	6	1	3
G/F	9	Marko Tomas	10	2	0
PG	10	Dontaye Draper	12	1	2
PF	11	Damir Markota	2	1	1
G/F	12	Krunoslav Simon	17	1	2
C	14	Luka Žorić	1	2	0
C	15	Lukša Andrić	9	6	0
C	21	Stanko Barać	5	2	0
Head coach:
Josip Vranković

=== 2012 Adecco Ex-Yu Cup in Ljubljana, Slovenia ===
The 2012 game was a part of exhibition tournament for the FIBA EuroBasket 2013 qualification in Slovenia. Croatia and Serbia had a very interesting game on the first day of the Adecco Cup on 3 August 2012. Serbia topped Croatia with final score of 90–74 and proved that they getting better form. Guard Miloš Teodosić led Serbia with great performances as he recorded 14 points, 9 assists and 4 rebounds. Forward Zoran Erceg added 14 points and Duško Savanović scored 13 points. It was obvious at the game that Serbia is much better team. Serbian coach Dušan Ivković even used last quarter to practice offense and defense combinations.

3 August 2012
18:00 CEST

Croatia	74–90	Serbia
Scoring by quarter: 16–23, 23–22, 14–21, 21–24
Pts: Roko Ukić 14; Rebs: Damir Markota 6 Asts: Roko Ukić 4		Pts: Erceg, Teodosić 14; Rebs: Štimac, Tepić 6 Asts: Miloš Teodosić 9

Arena Stožice, Ljubljana
Attendance: 1,000
Referees: Matej Boltauzer (SLO), Matej Špendl (SLO), Boris Krejić (SLO)

Boxscore

Starters:			Pts	Reb	Ast
G	4	Roko Ukić	14	4	4
G/F	11	Krunoslav Simon	8	2	1
SF	10	Luka Babić	5	1	0
PF	12	Damir Markota	7	6	3
C	5	Lukša Andrić	7	2	0
Reserves:					
SG	6	Goran Vrbanc	3	0	0
SF	7	Pavle Marčinković	0	0	0
PG	8	Rok Stipčević	10	2	2
F	9	Damjan Rudež	10	1	2
SG	13	Fran Pilepić	0	4	0
C	14	Luka Žorić	10	2	1
C	15	Darko Planinić	0	0	0
Head coach:
Jasmin Repeša

CRO	SRB

CRO	Statistics	SER
19/41 (46%)	2-pt field goals	23/35 (66%)
8/12 (67%)	3-pt field goals	9/28 (32%)
12/17 (71%)	Free throws	17/21 (81%)
4	Offensive rebounds	8
23	Defensive rebounds	23
27	Total rebounds	31
14	Assists	21
17	Turnovers	9
2	Steals	1
0	Blocks	0
24	Fouls	23

Starters:			Pts	Reb	Ast
G	4	Miloš Teodosić	14	4	9
G/F	13	Danilo Anđušić	3	0	1
SF	24	Vladimir Lučić	7	1	0
PF	14	Zoran Erceg	14	5	0
C	23	Vladimir Štimac	9	6	0
Reserves:					
G/F	5	Milenko Tepić	7	6	0
G	6	Aleksandar Rašić	6	1	4
G/F	7	Ivan Paunić	2	0	1
C	9	Mile Ilić	0	0	0
PF	10	Duško Savanović	13	3	4
SF	11	Marko Kešelj	6	1	0
PF	15	Milan Mačvan	9	1	2
Head coach:
Dušan Ivković

=== 2013 Spor Toto World Cup in Istanbul, Turkey ===
On 23 August 2013, Serbia won over Croatia with an 88–71 score, in the first round of the Spor Toto World Cup in Istanbul, Turkey. The Dušan Ivković's team was better for the most part of the match. They gained a six-point lead at halftime, the Croats then tried to return to the match, but the Serbian players routinely secured a victory in the last quarter. Success was encouraging for the Serbian team before participating in the EuroBasket 2013 in Slovenia, and the tournament in Istanbul is the last test before the continental competition. Key players were captain Nenad Krstić with 19, Raško Katić with 18 and Nemanja Bjelica with 14 points, while Marko Tomas in the Croatian team scored 16 points.

23 August 2013
16:15

Report

Croatia	71–88	Serbia
Scoring by quarter: 13–21, 22–20, 22–21, 14–26
Pts: Marko Tomas 16; Rebs: Tomić, Tomas 6 Asts: Bojan Bogdanović 5		Pts: Nenad Krstić 19; Rebs: Nenad Krstić 9 Asts: Nemanja Bjelica 4

Ülker Sports Arena, Istanbul
Attendance: not available
Referees: not available

Boxscore

Starters:			Pts	Reb	Ast
PG	10	Roko Ukić			
SF	7	Bojan Bogdanović	7	2	5
F	8	Damjan Rudež			
PF	12	Damir Markota	7	6	3
C	4	Ante Tomić	8	5	
Reserves:					
C	5	Lukša Andrić	4	2	
PG	6	Dontaye Draper	11		4
G/F	9	Marko Tomas	16	5	2
G/F	11	Krunoslav Simon	8	2	1
F/C	13	Mario Delaš			
C	14	Darko Planinić			
SG	15	Ante Delaš			
PF		Dario Šarić			
Head coach:
Jasmin Repeša

CRO	SRB

CRO	Statistics	SER
	2-pt field goals	
	3-pt field goals	
	Free throws	
	Offensive rebounds	
	Defensive rebounds	
	Total rebounds	
	Assists	
	Turnovers	
	Steals	
	Blocks	
	Fouls	

Starters:			Pts	Reb	Ast
G	9	Stefan Marković	3	2	2
G		Nemanja Nedović		2	1
F	25	Nikola Kalinić	5	7	
F	8	Nemanja Bjelica	14	5	4
C	12	Nenad Krstić	19	9	2
Reserves:					
SG	7	Bogdan Bogdanović	6	1	1
G/F	13	Danilo Anđušić	8		
C	14	Raško Katić	18	1	1
G		Vasilije Micić	4	2	3
C		Đorđe Gagić	2		
Head coach:
Dušan Ivković

=== 2014 Tournament in Pau, France ===
External videos
- Kosarkaski turnir u Pau, Francuska 2014. - Srbija - Hrvatska on YouTube (1:48:28)

Croatia suffered its second defeat at the exhibition tournament in Pau, France, after losing to Serbia 83–84 in overtime on 9 August 2014. In an equal match three minutes before the end, Croatia led 68–60, but the Serbs made 10–0 run in two minutes and took the lead 70–68. But then Croatian guard Oliver Lafayette scored a three-pointer and two free throws for the lead of the Croats 73–70. However, Serbian forward Marko Simonović scored 20 seconds before the game end and tied at 73–73 and the game went into overtime. In the additional five minutes, Croatia was in the lead, but six seconds before the end, Serbian guard Bogdan Bogdanović scored a three-pointer for Serbia's 84–83 lead. In the last run, Croatia tried through forward Bojan Bogdanović, but he missed a three-pointer and Serbia won 84–83 in the end. Serbia took what was offered, and Croatia suffered its defeat. Bojan Bogdanović was the best Croatian scorer with 19 points, and Luka Žorić 13, Damjan Rudež 11, Krunoslav Simon 11, and Oliver Lafayette scored 10 points. The Serbs were led by Marko Simonović with 24 points, Nemanja Bjelica scored 15 points and Miroslav Raduljica with 13 points joined them.

9 August 2014
N/A

Serbia	84–83 (OT)	Croatia
Scoring by quarter: 16–9, 18–20, 18–22, 21–22, Overtime: 11–10
Pts: Marko Simonović 24; Rebs: Miroslav Raduljica 5 Asts: not available		Pts: Bojan Bogdanović 19; Rebs: not available Asts: not available

Palais des Sports de Pau, Pau
Attendance: not available
Referees: not available

=== 2016 Super4 in Córdoba, Argentina ===
The Croats were better for most of the first half. The central player in the composition of the Croats was Krunoslav Simon. By entering the game of Nemanja Nedović Serbia accelerated the game, a series of points from the transition followed, so the nine points minus was reduced to only one. Since Serbian guard Miloš Teodosić was not in the team, the Croats closed all the approaches under the basket, and conditionally speaking, they fired from a distance. Serbia was not served by a shot, but the other guys were up to the task, especially in defense. In the end, in the first half, Croatia led with 40–36. Simon scored 15 points, on the other hand, the central figure in the Serbian team was center Miroslav Raduljica with 11 points. At the beginning of the third section, with a triple by Bogdan Bogdanović, Serbia took the lead with 50–48. The main problem was still the Krunoslav Simon-Dario Šarić duo. Even then, it was clear that a match awaited us in which the nuances would decide. Croatian forward Bojan Bogdanović set up the targets, Raduljica kept Serbia in the game. Five minutes before the end, after Rok Stipčević's triple, the score was tied at 70–70. The Croats have scored 10 three-pointers so far. An uncertain ending followed. Serbian guard Stefan Marković hit a three-pointer for 79–77. Serbian guard Stefan Jović hit a three-pointer in the last second of the attack for 82–77. Croatia was broken at the time. More precisely, a miracle should have happened so that they could return to the match with the Croats. The mistake of the Croats, Nikola Kalinić's dunk from the counter, Bogdanovic's points and practically everything was clear.

1 August 2016
18:00 (UTC−3)

Report

Serbia	86–77	Croatia
Scoring by quarter: 16–19, 20–21, 28–20, 22–17
Pts: Miroslav Raduljica 17; Rebs: four players 5 Asts: Bogdan Bogdanović 4		Pts: Bojan Bogdanović 18; Rebs: Dario Šarić 9 Asts: Krunoslav Simon 3

Orfeo Superdomo, Córdoba
Attendance: not available
Referees: Roberto Smith (USA), Gabriel Tarifeño (ARG), Aníbal Brites (ARG)

=== 2016 Summer Olympics ===
External videos
- Croatia vs Serbia - Rio 2016 Basketball Men's Quarter Final Full Game - 17 Aug 2016 on YouTube (1:56:41)

Serbia defeated Croatia, 86–83, in the last quarterfinal of the Olympic Basketball Tournament on 17 August 2016 to set up a semifinal clash with Australia.

In the closest game of the day, the Serbs saw a 14-point third quarter lead melt away in the final frame as Croatia got within one several times down the stretch. With time running out on them, Serbia had to foul to stop the clock and Serbians Miloš Teodosić and Nikola Jokić made good on their trips to the free-throw line in the final 18 seconds. There was little to separate the two teams in the first half, with Serbia up 20–19 at the end of the opening period and Croatia taking a 38–32 advantage at the break. Serbia took control thanks to a third quarter in which they outscored Croatia 34–14. They took their biggest lead of the night, 66–52, when guard Bogdan Bogdanović buried a three-pointer with 22 seconds left in the period. Croatia answered by going on a 22–7 run that got them within 74–73 on Darko Planinić's pair of free-throws with 3:26 remaining. Serbia stayed in front but Croatia were breathing down their neck. The Serbian side got a bit of breathing room when Miroslav Raduljica made the second of two foul shots to make it 79–75 with 27 seconds and that forced Croatia in having to foul intentionally to stop the clock but ultimately running out of time.

Had Serbia rolled to a comfortable win on the back of their impressive third quarter, a great turning point could have been in the shape of Raduljica's postering dunk over Croatian forward Dario Šarić in transition for a 41–40 lead with 6:50 left to play in the period. Instead, the real turning point really came down to Serbia knocking down 6-of-6 free-throws in the dying seconds of the game. Serbia got 39 points from their reserves, compared to 26 for Croatia. Bogdanović (game-high 18 points before fouling out), Stefan Jović (9 points and 4 rebounds) and Milan Mačvan (8 points and 3 rebounds) each played key roles in the outcome of this game. Teodosić and Jokić did not have huge games offensively, the former going only 2-of-11 for 9 points and the latter 3-of-8 for 12 points, but Teodosić handed out 10 assists and both players stepped up when it counted the most, knocking down shots from the charity stripe with the game on the line.

17 August 2016
22:15

Boxscore

Croatia	83–86	Serbia
Scoring by quarter: 19–20, 19–12, 14–34, 31–20
Pts: Bojan Bogdanović 28; Rebs: Darko Planinić 9 Asts: Krunoslav Simon 5		Pts: Bogdan Bogdanović 18; Rebs: three players 4 Asts: Miloš Teodosić 10

Carioca Arena 1, Rio de Janeiro
Attendance: 9,027
Referees: Juan García (ESP), Borys Ryzhyk (UKR), Roberto Vázquez (PUR)

Boxscore

Starters:			Pts	Reb	Ast
PG	10	Roko Ukić	4	1	4
SG	7	Krunoslav Simon	8	2	5
G/F	44	Bojan Bogdanović	28	3	2
F	9	Dario Šarić	7	4	1
C	15	Miro Bilan	10	4	0
Reserves:					
SF	4	Luka Babić	4	1	2
SG	5	Filip Krušlin	DNP		
PG	6	Rok Stipčević	DNP		
G/F	8	Mario Hezonja	16	8	2
C	12	Darko Planinić	6	9	0
SF	33	Željko Šakić	DNP		
C	35	Marko Arapović	DNP		
Head coach:
Aleksandar Petrović

CRO	SRB

CRO	Statistics	SER
16/32 (50%)	2-pt field goals	21/48 (44%)
7/19 (37%)	3-pt field goals	8/23 (35%)
30/38 (79%)	Free throws	20/25 (80%)
10	Offensive rebounds	14
29	Defensive rebounds	21
39	Total rebounds	35
16	Assists	22
18	Turnovers	10
3	Steals	10
0	Blocks	2
28	Fouls	31

Starters:			Pts	Reb	Ast
G	9	Stefan Marković	12	4	3
G	4	Miloš Teodosić	9	2	10
F	10	Nikola Kalinić	6	4	0
PF	25	Milan Mačvan	8	3	0
C	13	Miroslav Raduljica	12	3	0
Reserves:					
SF	5	Marko Simonović	0	1	0
SG	7	Bogdan Bogdanović	18	1	5
G	11	Nemanja Nedović	0	0	0
PF	12	Stefan Birčević	DNP		
F/C	14	Nikola Jokić	12	3	3
C	15	Vladimir Štimac	0	2	0
PG	24	Stefan Jović	9	4	1
Head coach:
Aleksandar Đorđević

== Statistics ==
Note: Last updated on 17 August 2016

Competitions	Games played	Croatia wins	Serbia wins
EuroBasket	2	0 (.000)	2 (1.000)
FIBA Basketball World Cup	1	0 (.000)	1 (1.000)
Summer Olympic Games	1	0 (.000)	1 (1.000)
Exhibitions	9	2 (.222)	7 (.778)
Total	13	2 (.154)	11 (.846)

== Comparison in major international tournaments ==
Tournament	Croatia	FR Yugoslavia	Notes
(Spain) 1992 Summer Olympics	Silver	suspended	Yugoslavia was banned from international sports tournaments as part of United Nations Security Council Resolution 757.
(Germany) 1993 EuroBasket	Bronze	suspended	Yugoslavia was banned from international sports tournaments as part of United Nations Security Council Resolution 757.
(Canada) 1994 FIBA World Championship	Bronze	suspended	Yugoslavia was banned from international sports tournaments as part of United Nations Security Council Resolution 757.
(Greece) 1995 EuroBasket	Bronze	Gold	
(United States) 1996 Summer Olympics	7th	Silver	
(Spain) 1997 EuroBasket	11th	Gold	Yugoslavia won 64–62 over Croatia, following the Aleksandar Đorđević's 3-point buzzer beater.
(Greece) 1998 FIBA World Championship	did not qualify	Gold	
(France) 1999 EuroBasket	9th	Bronze	
(Australia) 2000 Summer Olympics	did not qualify	6th	
(Turkey) 2001 EuroBasket	7th	Gold	Yugoslavia had an 80–66 win over Croatia.
(United States) 2002 FIBA World Championship	did not qualify	Gold	
(Sweden) 2003 EuroBasket	11th	Serbia and Montenegro	
(Sweden) 2003 EuroBasket	11th	6th	
(Greece) 2004 Summer Olympics	did not qualify	11th	
(Serbia and Montenegro) 2005 EuroBasket	7th	9th	
(Japan) 2006 FIBA World Championship	did not qualify	11th	
(Spain) 2007 EuroBasket	6th	Serbia	
(Spain) 2007 EuroBasket	6th	14th	
(China) 2008 Summer Olympics	6th	did not qualify	
(Poland) 2009 EuroBasket	6th	Silver	
(Turkey) 2010 FIBA World Championship	14th	4th	Serbia had a 73–72 win over Croatia in a Round of 16 game.
(Lithuania) 2011 EuroBasket	13th	8th	
(United Kingdom) 2012 Summer Olympics	did not qualify		
(Slovenia) 2013 EuroBasket	4th	7th	
(Spain) 2014 FIBA Basketball World Cup	10th	Silver	
(France) (Croatia) (Germany) (Latvia) 2015 EuroBasket	9th	4th	
(Brazil) 2016 Summer Olympics	5th	Silver	Serbia had an 86–83 win over Croatia in a quarterfinal game.
(Finland) (Israel) (Romania) (Turkey) 2017 EuroBasket	10th	Silver	
(China) 2019 FIBA Basketball World Cup	did not qualify	5th	
(Japan) 2020 Summer Olympics	did not qualify		
(Czech Republic) (Georgia (country)) (Italy) (Germany) 2022 EuroBasket	12th	9th	
(Indonesia) (Japan) (Philippines) 2023 FIBA Basketball World Cup	did not qualify	Silver	
(France) 2024 Summer Olympics	did not qualify	Bronze	
(Cyprus) (Finland) (Poland) (Latvia) 2025 EuroBasket	did not qualify	10th	

== See also ==
- Croatia–Serbia football rivalry
- Croatia–Serbia relations
- Yugoslavia men's national basketball team
