= List of Croatia men's national basketball team players =

This is a list of men's national basketball team players who represented Croatia at the EuroBasket, the FIBA Basketball World Cup, and the Summer Olympics.

Since 1992, the Croatia has participated at fourteen EuroBasket tournaments (1993, 1995, 1997, 1999, 2001, 2003, 2005, 2007, 2009, 2011, 2013, 2015, 2017, 2022), three Basketball World Cups (1994, 2010, 2014) and four Olympic tournaments (Barcelona 1992, Atlanta 1996, Beijing 2008, Rio de Janeiro 2016).

Point guard Roko Ukić holds the records of ten tournaments played in total.

This list does not include players who played only at the qualification tournaments for named competitions, the Mediterranean Games or other minor tournaments.

== Key ==
	EuroBasket
	FIBA Basketball World Cup
	Summer Olympics
	Gold medal
	Silver medal
	Bronze medal
4	Uniform number

== Players ==
Note: This list is correct through the end of the EuroBasket 2022.

Players	92	93	94	95	96	97	99	01	03	05	07	08	09	10	11	13	14	15	16	17	22	Total	Individual awards
Vladan Alanović	8	8	8	8	8	8	–	–	–	–	–	–	–	–	–	–	–	–	–	–	–	6	—
Lukša Andrić	–	–	–	–	–	–	–	–	–	–	–	–	–	15	5	5	5	–	–	–	–	4	—
Franjo Arapović	9	9	–	–	–	–	–	–	–	–	–	–	–	–	–	–	–	–	–	–	–	2	—
Marko Arapović	–	–	–	–	–	–	–	–	–	–	–	–	–	–	–	–	–	–	35	–	–	1	—
Luka Babić	–	–	–	–	–	–	–	–	–	–	–	–	–	–	–	–	15	–	4	–	–	2	—
Dalibor Bagarić	–	–	–	–	–	–	–	–	14	14	–	–	–	–	–	–	–	–	–	–	–	2	—
Marko Banić	–	–	–	–	–	–	–	–	–	–	13	13	13	13	–	–	–	–	–	–	–	4	—
Stanko Barać	–	–	–	–	–	–	–	–	–	–	15	15	–	–	15	–	–	–	–	–	–	3	—
Marino Baždarić	–	–	–	–	–	–	–	–	5	–	–	–	–	–	–	–	–	–	–	–	–	1	—
Dragan Bender	–	–	–	–	–	–	–	–	–	–	–	–	–	–	–	–	–	–	–	17	–	1	—
Miro Bilan	–	–	–	–	–	–	–	–	–	–	–	–	–	–	–	–	–	15	15	–	–	2	—
Bojan Bogdanović	–	–	–	–	–	–	–	–	–	–	–	–	–	7	7	7	7	7	44	44	44	8	1 honour: EuroBasket All-Tournament Team (2013)
Ivan Buva	–	–	–	–	–	–	–	–	–	–	–	–	–	–	–	–	–	–	–	25	–	1	—
Danko Cvjetičanin	6	12	12	–	–	–	–	–	–	–	–	–	–	–	–	–	–	–	–	–	–	3	—
Ante Delaš	–	–	–	–	–	–	–	–	–	–	–	–	–	–	–	15	–	–	–	–	–	1	—
Mario Delaš	–	–	–	–	–	–	–	–	–	–	–	–	–	–	–	13	–	–	–	–	–	1	—
Dontaye Draper	–	–	–	–	–	–	–	–	–	–	–	–	–	–	10	6	–	13	–	–	–	3	—
Gordan Giriček	–	–	–	–	–	6	10	10	10	10	–	–	–	–	–	–	–	–	–	–	–	5	—
Lovro Gnjidić	–	–	–	–	–	–	–	–	–	–	–	–	–	–	–	–	–	–	–	–	10	1	—
Alan Gregov	12	6	5	12	–	–	–	–	–	–	–	–	–	–	–	–	–	–	–	–	–	4	—
Ivan Grgat	–	–	–	–	–	14	–	–	–	–	–	–	–	–	–	–	–	–	–	–	–	1	—
Hrvoje Henjak	–	–	–	–	–	–	15	–	–	–	–	–	–	–	–	–	–	–	–	–	–	1	—
Mario Hezonja	–	–	–	–	–	–	–	–	–	–	–	–	–	–	–	–	13	23	8	–	8	4	—
Miro Jurić	–	–	13	–	–	–	–	–	–	–	–	–	–	–	–	–	–	–	–	–	–	1	—
Mario Kasun	–	–	–	–	–	–	–	–	–	4	14	–	15	–	–	–	–	–	–	–	–	3	—
Siniša Kelečević	–	–	–	–	–	12	–	–	–	–	–	–	–	–	–	–	–	–	–	–	–	1	—
Arijan Komazec	13	13	6	6	6	–	–	–	–	–	–	–	–	–	–	–	–	–	–	–	–	5	—
Emilio Kovačić	–	15	–	–	–	10	–	11	–	–	–	–	–	–	–	–	–	–	–	–	–	3	—
Vladimir Krstić	–	–	–	–	–	–	4	9	–	–	–	–	–	–	–	–	–	–	–	–	–	2	—
Filip Krušlin	–	–	–	–	–	–	–	–	–	–	–	–	–	–	–	–	–	–	5	5	–	2	—
Toni Kukoč	7	–	7	7	7	–	7	–	–	–	–	–	–	–	–	–	–	–	–	–	–	5	1 honour: EuroBasket All-Tournament Team (1995)
Davor Kus	–	–	–	–	–	–	–	–	–	–	5	5	5	5	–	–	–	–	–	–	–	4	—
Oliver Lafayette	–	–	–	–	–	–	–	–	–	–	–	–	–	–	–	–	6	–	–	–	–	1	—
Krešimir Lončar	–	–	–	–	–	–	–	–	–	–	–	14	12	12	–	–	–	–	–	–	–	3	—
Matej Mamić	–	–	–	–	–	–	–	13	13	13	–	–	–	–	–	–	–	–	–	–	–	3	—
Davor Marcelić	–	–	–	–	15	15	–	–	–	–	–	–	–	–	–	–	–	–	–	–	–	2	—
Ivica Marić	–	–	–	9	–	–	–	–	–	–	–	–	–	–	–	–	–	–	–	–	–	1	—
Damir Markota	–	–	–	–	–	–	–	–	–	–	12	–	–	–	12	12	12	–	–	–	–	4	—
Karlo Matković	–	–	–	–	–	–	–	–	–	–	–	–	–	–	–	–	–	–	–	–	17	1	—
Dominik Mavra	–	–	–	–	–	–	–	–	–	–	–	–	–	–	–	–	–	–	–	–	30	1	—
Damir Milačić	–	–	–	–	–	7	–	–	–	–	–	–	–	–	–	–	–	–	–	–	–	1	—
Veljko Mršić	–	16	15	13	13	–	6	7	–	–	–	–	–	–	–	–	–	–	–	–	–	6	—
Damir Mulaomerović	–	–	–	–	12	5	5	4	4	–	–	–	–	–	–	–	–	–	–	–	–	5	—
Aramis Naglić	15	–	–	–	–	–	–	–	–	–	–	–	–	–	–	–	–	–	–	–	–	1	—
Sandro Nicević	–	–	–	–	–	–	–	–	7	–	–	11	14	–	–	–	–	–	–	–	–	3	—
Davor Pejčinović	–	–	10	15	–	11	–	–	–	–	–	–	–	–	–	–	–	–	–	–	–	3	—
Velimir Perasović	5	5	–	5	5	–	–	–	–	–	–	–	–	–	–	–	–	–	–	–	–	4	—
Hrvoje Perinčić	–	–	–	–	–	–	–	–	11	–	–	–	–	–	–	–	–	–	–	–	–	1	—
Toni Perković	–	–	–	–	–	–	–	–	–	–	–	–	–	–	–	–	–	–	–	–	1	1	—
Dražen Petrović	4	–	–	–	–	–	–	–	–	–	–	–	–	–	–	–	–	–	–	–	–	1	—
Darko Planinić	–	–	–	–	–	–	–	–	–	–	–	–	–	–	–	–	–	–	12	12	–	2	—
Zoran Planinić	–	–	–	–	–	–	–	–	9	11	10	10	10	10	–	–	–	–	–	–	–	6	—
Joško Poljak	–	–	–	–	–	–	11	–	–	–	–	–	–	–	–	–	–	–	–	–	–	1	—
Marko Popović	–	–	–	–	–	–	–	–	6	6	6	6	6	6	6	–	–	–	–	6	–	8	—
Nikola Prkačin	–	–	–	–	–	13	8	8	8	8	8	8	8	–	–	–	–	–	–	–	–	8	—
Roko Prkačin	–	–	–	–	–	–	–	–	–	–	–	–	–	–	–	–	–	–	–	–	4	1	—
Dino Rađa	14	14	14	14	14	–	–	–	–	–	–	–	–	–	–	–	–	–	–	–	–	5	2 honours: EuroBasket All-Tournament Team (1993) World Cup All-Tournament Team (1994)
Ivan Ramljak	–	–	–	–	–	–	–	–	–	–	–	–	–	–	–	–	–	–	–	27	27	2	—
Damir Rančić	–	–	–	–	–	–	–	–	–	15	–	–	–	–	–	–	–	–	–	–	–	1	—
Slaven Rimac	–	–	–	–	9	9	–	–	–	–	–	–	–	–	–	–	–	–	–	–	–	2	—
Marin Rozić	–	–	–	–	–	–	–	–	–	–	7	7	9	–	–	–	–	–	–	–	–	3	—
Damjan Rudež	–	–	–	–	–	–	–	–	–	–	–	12	–	–	13	9	9	5	–	–	–	5	—
Jurica Ružić	–	–	–	–	–	–	12	–	–	–	–	–	–	–	–	–	–	–	–	–	–	1	—
Josip Sesar	–	–	–	–	–	4	–	6	–	–	–	–	–	–	–	–	–	–	–	–	–	2	—
Krunoslav Simon	–	–	–	–	–	–	–	–	–	–	–	–	–	–	11	11	11	11	7	7	7	7	—
Mate Skelin	–	–	–	–	–	–	–	12	15	–	–	–	–	–	–	–	–	–	–	–	–	2	—
Jaleen Smith	–	–	–	–	–	–	–	–	–	–	–	–	–	–	–	–	–	–	–	–	3	1	—
Rok Stipčević	–	–	–	–	–	–	–	–	–	–	–	–	–	8	8	–	–	6	6	–	–	4	—
Mario Stojić	–	–	–	–	–	–	–	–	–	–	11	–	11	–	–	–	–	–	–	–	–	2	—
Željko Šakić	–	–	–	–	–	–	–	–	–	–	–	–	–	–	–	–	–	–	33	–	–	1	—
Dario Šarić	–	–	–	–	–	–	–	–	–	–	–	–	–	–	–	8	8	8	9	9	9	6	—
Žan Tabak	10	10	–	–	10	–	–	15	–	–	–	–	–	–	–	–	–	–	–	–	–	4	—
Marko Tomas	–	–	–	–	–	–	–	–	–	12	9	9	–	9	9	–	–	9	–	33	–	7	—
Ivan Tomeljak	–	–	–	–	–	–	13	–	–	–	–	–	–	–	–	–	–	–	–	–	–	1	—
Ante Tomić	–	–	–	–	–	–	–	–	–	–	–	–	–	11	4	4	4	4	–	–	–	5	—
Roko Ukić	–	–	–	–	–	–	–	–	–	5	4	4	4	4	–	10	10	10	10	10	–	10	—
Josip Vranković	–	–	4	4	4	–	–	5	–	–	–	–	–	–	–	–	–	–	–	–	–	4	—
Stojko Vranković	11	11	11	11	11	–	–	–	–	–	–	–	–	–	–	–	–	–	–	–	–	5	—
Nikola Vujčić	–	–	–	–	–	–	14	14	–	7	–	–	7	–	–	–	–	–	–	–	–	4	—
Gordan Zadravec	–	–	–	–	–	–	9	–	–	–	–	–	–	–	–	–	–	–	–	–	–	1	—
Ivica Zubac	–	–	–	–	–	–	–	–	–	–	–	–	–	–	–	–	–	–	–	–	40	1	—
Andrija Žižić	–	–	–	–	–	–	–	–	12	9	–	–	–	–	–	–	–	–	–	–	–	2	—
Luka Žorić	–	–	–	–	–	–	–	–	–	–	–	–	–	14	14	14	14	21	–	11	–	6	—
Ivica Žurić	–	7	9	10	–	–	–	–	–	–	–	–	–	–	–	–	–	–	–	–	–	3	—
