= Basketball World Cup (Turkey) =

International basketball event

- Formerly: Efes Pilsen İstanbul World Cup (2002-2005); Efes Pilsen World Cup (2006-2010); Spor Toto World Cup (2011-present)
- Sport: Basketball
- Founded: 2002
- Founder: TBF
- First season: 2002
- No. of teams: 4
- Country: Turkey
- Continent: FIBA (International)
- Most recent champion: Serbia (1st title)
- Most titles: Turkey (3 titles)
- Broadcaster: CNN Türk
- Website: Basketball World Cup

The Basketball World Cup was an international basketball tournament held in Turkey. Established in 2002, it was sponsored by the Turkish brewing company Efes Pilsen, which also runs a basketball club in Istanbul.

== Winners ==
- 2002 - Yugoslavia
- 2003 - Italy
- 2004 - Slovenia
- 2005 - Turkey
- 2006 - Turkey
- 2007 - Croatia
- 2008 - Turkey
- 2009 - Croatia
- 2010 - Argentina
- 2011 - Germany
- 2013 - Serbia

== See also ==
- Acropolis International Basketball Tournament
- Adecco Cup
- Basketball at the Summer Olympics
- FIBA Asia Cup
- FIBA Basketball World Cup
- FIBA Diamond Ball
- FIBA Stanković Continental Champions' Cup
- Marchand Continental Championship Cup
- William Jones Cup
