= Milorad Mažić =

Serbian football referee (born 1973)

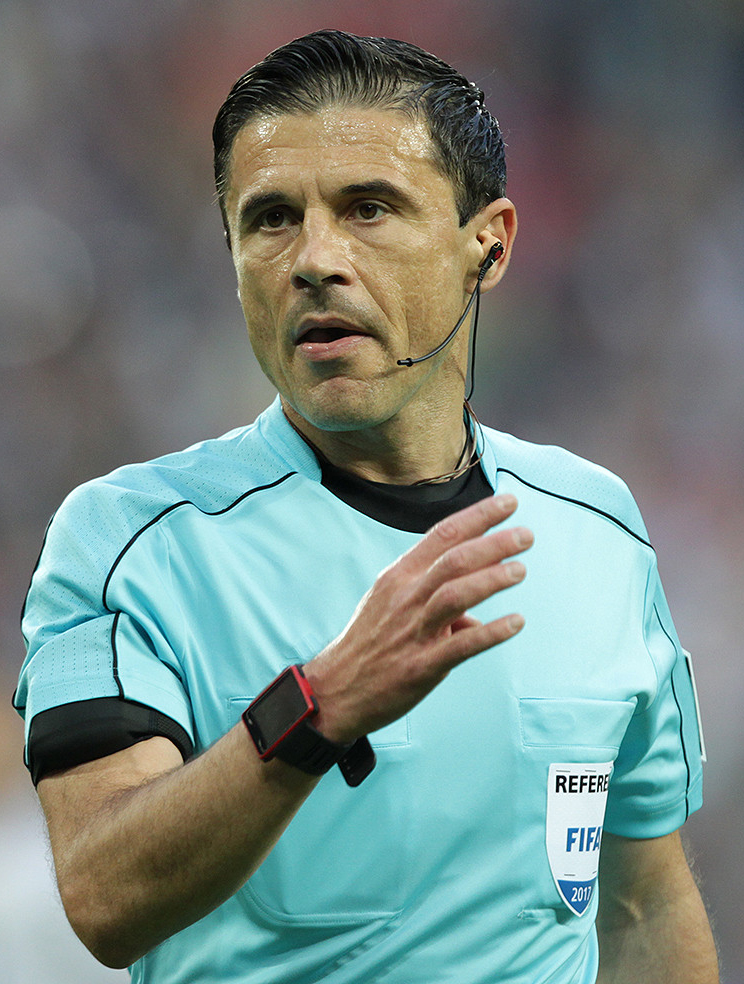
- Mažić officiating the 2017 Confederations Cup Final
- Full name: Milorad Mažić
- Born: 23 March 1973 (age 53); Vrbas, SR Serbia, SFR Yugoslavia

Domestic
Years	League	Role
2006–2020	SuperLiga	Referee
2009–2012	Liga I	Referee

International
Years	League	Role
2009–2019	FIFA listed	Referee
2013–2020	UEFA Elite	Referee

Milorad Mažić (Serbian Cyrillic: Милорад Мажић, pronounced [mǐlorad mǎʒitɕ]; born 23 March 1973) is a former Serbian international association football referee. He became a FIFA referee in 2009. Beside working in the Serbian football league system, Mažić officiated numerous matches in the UEFA Champions League (including the 2018 final) and the Europa League, as well as the 2016 UEFA Super Cup. He refereed matches at the 2014 FIFA World Cup, UEFA Euro 2016, 2017 FIFA Confederations Cup (including the final match). He was selected as a referee for the 2018 FIFA World Cup. He was awarded a Silver Medal for Merits of the Republic of Serbia. He was selected the best Serbian referee nine consecutive times.

== Refereeing career ==
During the summer of 2006 Mažić was selected to referee the Serbian SuperLiga matches for the upcoming 2006–07 season.

In 2008, Mažić refereed for the first time the Eternal derby between Belgrade football clubs Red Star Belgrade and FK Partizan; throughout the years, he achieved the absolute record (both in former Yugoslav and Serbian football history), refereeing 13 matches between Belgrade's "eternal rivals".

His first international appearance happened in March 2009 at the European Under-17 Championship qualifications, and also at the Championship itself, where he officiated the match between Germany and Italy. Soon thereafter, he refereed the friendly match between Montenegro and Wales on 12 August 2009. On 7 September 2009, Mažić acquired his first experience in the European club competition, refereeing the return leg of the Europa League first qualifying phase tie between Llanelli and Motherwell. In total, Mažić refereed 12 league matches that season in Serbia's top flight.

In October 2009 he refereed his first international senior match — a 2010 World Cup qualifier between Finland and Wales in Helsinki. The same season also saw him referee a Romanian Liga I match between FC Politehnica Timișoara and Dinamo București on 23 November 2009.

In the UEFA Champions League, Mažić first appeared at the Camp Nou Stadium on 19 September 2012, refereeing Barcelona's 3–2 win over Spartak Moscow match. During the same season, as referee of the UEFA Elite-development category, he officiated one of the semi-final matches of the UEFA Europa League – at the Şükrü Saracoğlu Stadium in Istanbul, on 25 April 2013, which was a precedent for a referee of the Elite-development category. He also refereed the semi-final first leg match between Fenerbahçe and Benfica. Soon thereafter, following his success in that match, he was awarded the UEFA Elite category in June 2013.

In early April 2014, Mažić was selected as the referee of the Champions League quarter-final first leg match between Paris Saint-Germain and Chelsea at Parc des Princes. A month later, he refereed a Europa League semi-final match, the return leg between Valencia and Sevilla at Mestalla.

=== 2014 World Cup ===
Mažić refereed the Germany vs. Portugal group stage match in Salvador da Bahia. In the 11th minute of the contest, he awarded a penalty shot to Germany, and later, in the 37th minute with Germany now up 2–0, Mažić showed red card to Portugal's Pepe. In the next game, Mažić refereed the Argentina vs. Iran group stage match in Belo Horizonte. After the game, Iranian manager Carlos Queiroz, unsatisfied with the referee, was quoted saying: "Will this man be able to sleep tonight? Or for the rest of his life?".

=== 2014–2016 ===
Having refereed the Champions League round-of-16 return leg in March 2015 between Borussia Dortmund and Juventus, Mažić was awarded the quarter-final first leg between Atlético Madrid and Real Madrid. The match ended 0–0 and he handed out five yellow cards. After the match Mario Suárez, who received one of the cards, said "The referee is very bad. They can't use a Serbian referee for these type of games". This was taken by some as an ethnic slur. Mario Suárez later apologized, tweeting that he just meant "that games of this magnitude should be given to a referee from one of the big leagues". However, after that match, Mažić was positively evaluated. Mažić later refereed the Europa League semi-final return leg in mid-May, his third time being involved in a match at this stage of competition, between Dnipro and Napoli that was played in Kyiv instead of Dnipropetrovsk due to the War in Donbas.

In July 2015 Mažić got hired by the Egyptian FA to referee the country's biggest league derby between Cairo cross-town rivals Al Ahly and Zamalek. The match of the Egyptian Premier League was played on 22 July 2015 in a neutral venue in Alexandria without a crowd. Mažić was appointed in February 2016 to referee the UEFA Europa League match between Manchester United and Liverpool at the Old Trafford Stadium, and was the only non-British referee alongside Carlos Velasco Carballo to referee the derby between these two giants.

=== Euro 2016 ===
UEFA Referees Committee appointed the Serbian referee team, led by Mažić, to run matches at the Euro 2016 in France. The Serbian referee team was firstly appointed to referee the Republic of Ireland vs Sweden group stage match at the Stade de France in Paris on 13 June, which ended 1–1. They refereed the match on 17 June in group D between Spain and Turkey at the Alianz Riviera in Nice which Spain won 3–0. In the next phase of the Cup, the Serbian team was appointed to run the Round of 16 match between Hungary and Belgium at the Stadium Municipal in Toulouse, which the Belgians won 4–0.

During the tournament, Mažić also worked as a fourth official twice, at the Poland vs Portugal and France vs Iceland quarter-final matches. The general impression was that Mažić refereed successfully in all three of his matches, keeping constant quality and even enhancing it. Thus, he was proposed, beside Mark Clattenburg from England and Viktor Kassai from Hungary, to be a candidate for the final match. Ultimately, Clattenburg was appointed to be the referee at the final match.

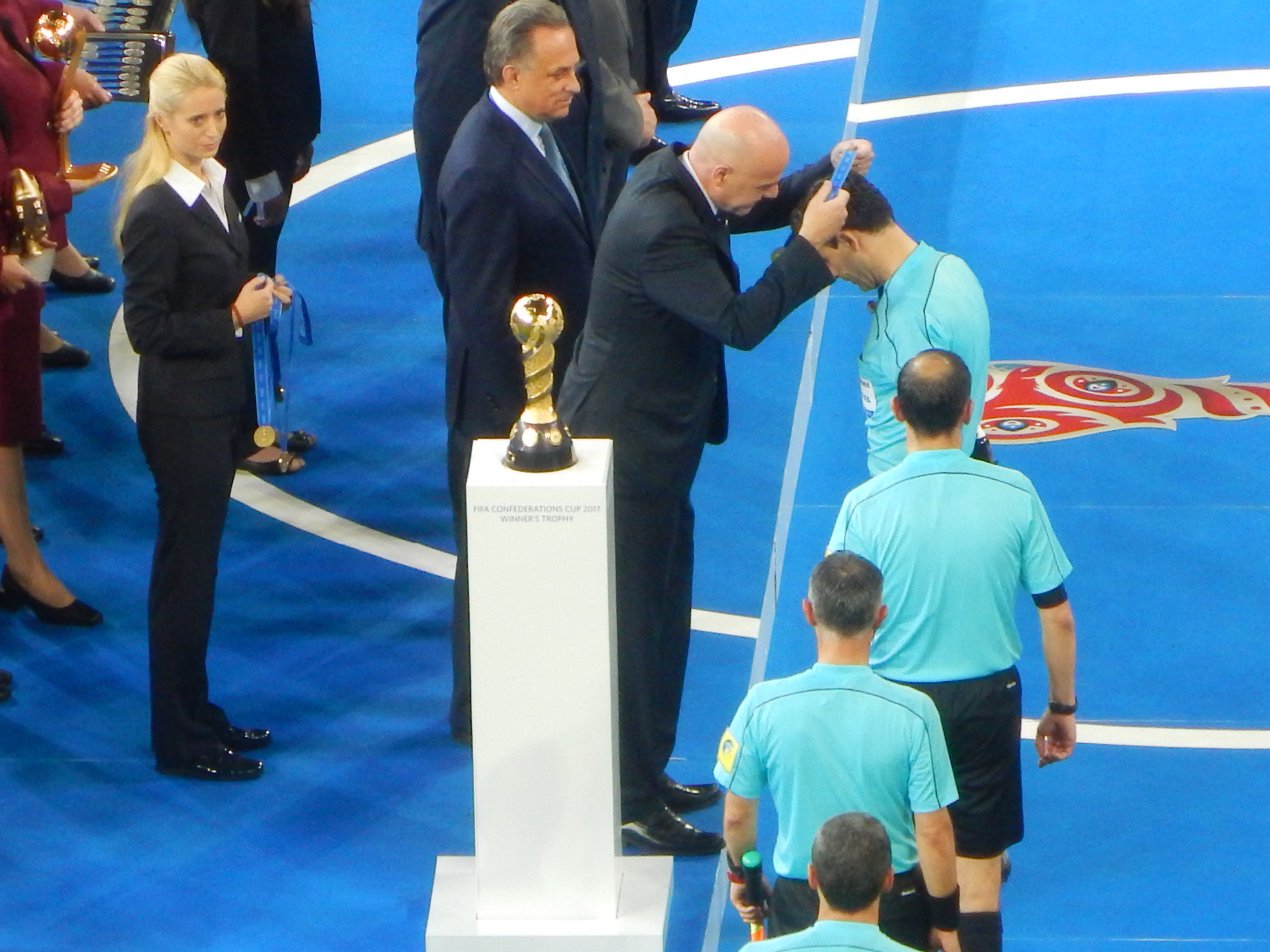
Mažić and his assistants Milovan Ristić and Dalibor Đurđević receiving their awards after the final match of 2017 Confederations Cup

=== 2016–2018 ===
At the beginning of the 2016–17 season, the UEFA Referees Committee appointed Mažić to officiate the 2016 UEFA Super Cup between Real Madrid and Sevilla at the Lerkendal Stadium in Trondheim, Norway. Real Madrid won hitting a goal at the end of the 120 minutes lasting match.

Mažić refereed the 2017 FIFA Confederations Cup Final match between Chile and Germany played in Saint Petersburg on 2 July 2017; Germany upset Chile in a hard-fought, physical match winning 1–0.

On 26 May 2018, Mažić and his assistants Milovan Ristić and Dalibor Đurđević refereed the 2018 UEFA Champions League Final between Liverpool and Real Madrid in Kyiv. He was the last official to referee a Champions League Final without VAR

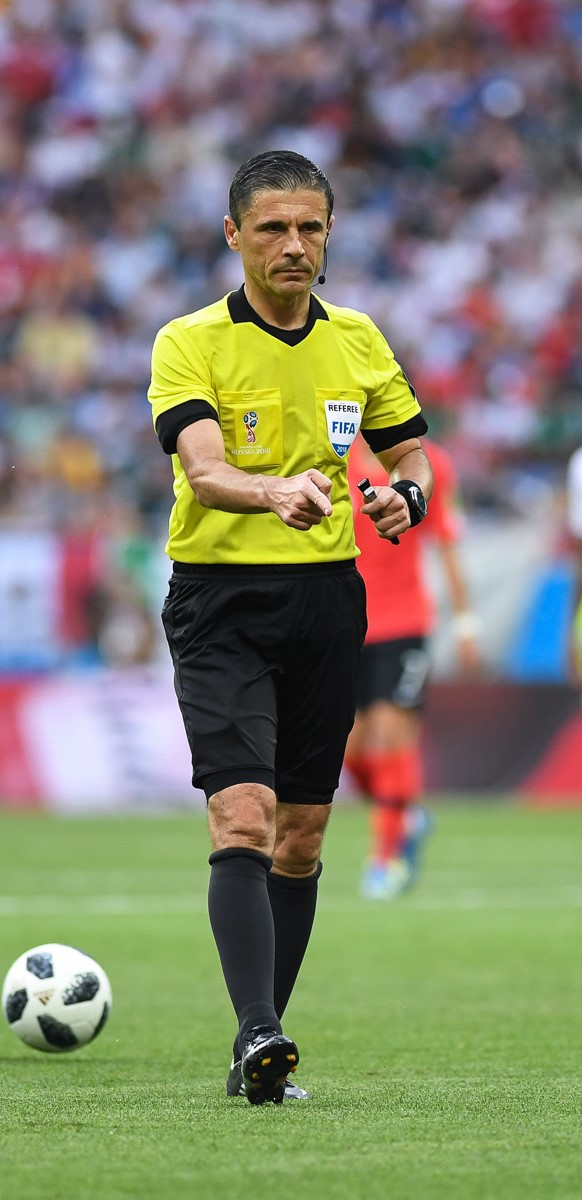
WC 2018: Mexico - Korea

=== 2018 FIFA World Cup ===
On 29 March 2018, FIFA announced that he will officiate some matches at 2018 FIFA World Cup along with Ristić and Đurđević as assistant referees.

The Serbian team officiated three matches. The first match was between South Korea and Mexico in Rostov-on-Don on 23 June. After that they were appointed to referee the match between Senegal and Colombia in Samara on 28 June. At the next phase, the Serbian team was appointed to officiate quarter-final match between Brazil and Belgium in Kazan on 6 July. Mažić was once the fourth official at the tournament.

Mažić was successful in all three of his matches. Serbian team stayed until the end of the World Cup with other candidates for the final match. Due to Croatia playing in the finals, the Serbian team was not eligible for the final match.

=== China ===
On 23 February 2019, it was announced that Mažić had been hired by CFA to become one of the professional referees in China. The same year he would be selected as the best referee of the Chinese Super League and thus become the first foreigner to win that recognition.

Sporting positions
Preceded by (Scotland) Willie Collum	UEFA Super Cup Final Referees; 2016	Succeeded by (Italy) Gianluca Rocchi
Preceded by (Netherlands) Björn Kuipers	FIFA Confederation Cup Final Referees; 2017	Succeeded by Tournament Abolished
Preceded by (Germany) Felix Brych	UEFA Champions League Final Referees; 2018	Succeeded by (Slovenia) Damir Skomina
