= Dalibor Đurđević =

Former Serbian football referee (born 1973)

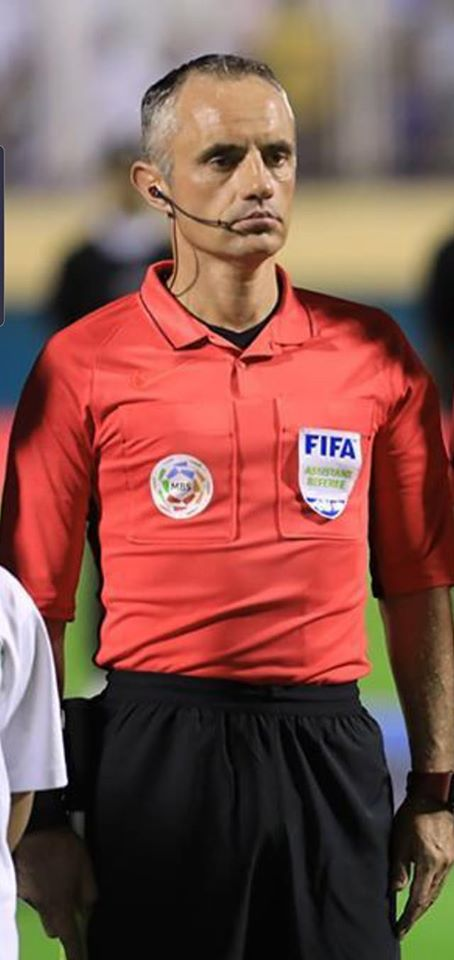
- Đurđević in the Saudi Professional League
- Full name: Dalibor Đurđević
- Born: 25 March 1973 (age 53); Kruševac, SR Serbia, SFR Yugoslavia

Domestic
| Years | League | Role |
| 1994-1999 | 3rd division | Referee |
| 1999-2006 | 2nd division | Referee |
| 2006-2009 | 1st division | Referee |
| 2009-2020 | Serbian SuperLiga | Assistant referee |
| 2020-2022 | Serbian SuperLiga | Video assistant referee (VAR) |

International
| Years | League | Role |
| 2011-2021 | FIFA | Assistant Referee |
| 2020-2022 | FIFA | Video match official (VMO) |

Dalibor Đurđević (Serbian Cyrillic: Далибор Ђурђевић, pronounced [dalibor dʑurdʑevitɕ]; born 25 March 1973) is a former Serbian football referee and FIFA Assistant Referee. As a part of the Milorad Mažić referee team, Đurđević officiated at the 2018 FIFA World Cup in Russia, numerous matches in the UEFA Champions League, including the 2018 UEFA Champions League Final, UEFA Europa League, 2017 FIFA Confederations Cup Final, 2016 UEFA Euro in France, 2016 UEFA Super Cup, 2014 FIFA World Cup in Brazil, 2013 FIFA U-20 World Cup in Turkey, as well as many appearances in the biggest matches organized by Football Association of Serbia, Chinese Football Association, Qatar Football Association, Saudi Arabian Football Federation, and Egyptian Football Association as Assistant Referee and Video assistant referee (VAR).

Đurđević was selected as The Best Assistant Referee 5 consecutive seasons by the Football Association of Serbia, and he is a holder of numerous prestigious awards for professional football refereeing, both home and abroad.

== Refereeing career ==
He started his referee career in 1994 and after only three years received the National Referee badge.

He spent 10 years (1999-2009) in the First Serbian Division. The little-known fact is that during that time he refereed 126 games with a whistle in his hands (i.e. as a center official) and even made his debut in the Serbian Super League in 2004.

In 2009 he switched to being an Assistant referee and made it to the international FIFA Assistant Referee list a short time after. He later mentioned in one of his interviews that it was the most important decision in his life. He joined the Milorad Mažić team in 2012 and together with FIFA Assistant Referee Milovan Ristić, became an indispensable team member. He praised Mažić and his vision for the team and knew that they would achieve great things together as a team, not without all the hard work that comes with it.

=== 2013 FIFA U20 World Cup Turkey ===
The whole team moved to the UEFA Elite category and were invited to the 2013 FIFA U20 World Cup in Turkey, where they were in charge of two games: Columbia –Australia 1-1 (Hüseyin Avni Aker Stadium, Trabzon, 22 June 2013) and Nigeria-Uruguay 1–2 at Türk Telekom Arena, Istanbul on 2 July 2013.

=== 2014 FIFA World Cup ===
As a part of the Mažić referee team, he refereed the Germany vs. Portugal group stage match in Salvador da Bahia, in which Pepe headbutted Thomas Muller and was sent off and Germany won 4–0.

The second game between Argentina vs. Iran (1-0) was their last at this championship. There was a lot of talk in the football and referee circles about Pablo Zabaleta’s tackle on Ashkan Dejagah in Argentina’s box after the 58’ minute.

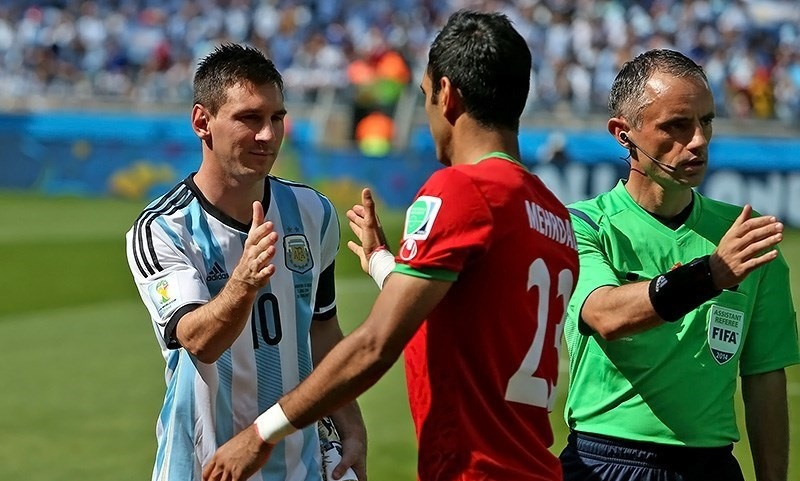
2014 World Cup, Estádio Mineirão, Belo Horizonte: Argentina vs Iran

=== 2014–2016 ===
Having been a part of the referee team in charge of the UEFA Champions League round-of-16 return leg in March 2015 between Borussia Dortmund and Juventus, and the quarter-final first leg between Atlético Madrid and Real Madrid, they later refereed the Europa League semi-final return leg FC Dnipro vs SSC Napoli.

In July 2015 the team was asked by the Egyptian FA to referee the country's biggest league Cairo derby between cross-town rivals Al Ahly and Zamalek.

They were appointed in February 2016 to referee the UEFA Europa League knockout match between Manchester United and Liverpool at the Old Trafford Stadium in front of 75 180 people.

=== UEFA Euro 2016 ===
UEFA Referees Committee appointed the Serbian referee team led by Mažić, to run matches at the Euro 2016 in France. The Serbian referee team was firstly appointed to referee the Republic of Ireland vs Sweden group stage match at the Stade de France in Paris on 13 June, which ended 1–1.

They refereed the match on June, 17 in group D between Spain and Turkey at the Alianz Riviera in Nice which Spain won 3–0.

In the next phase of the Cup, the Serbian team was appointed to run the Round of 16 match between Hungary and Belgium at the Stadium Municipal in Toulouse, which the Belgians won 4–0.

=== 2016 UEFA Super Cup ===
Fresh from officiating at UEFA EURO 2016, as a result of a great form, UEFA Referees Committee appointed Mažić, Ristić, and Đurđević to officiate the most prestigious assignment of their careers (as of that year). The 2016 UEFA Super Cup between Real Madrid CF and Sevilla FC at the Lerkendal Stadium in Trondheim, Norway, that Real won 3:2 after extra time.

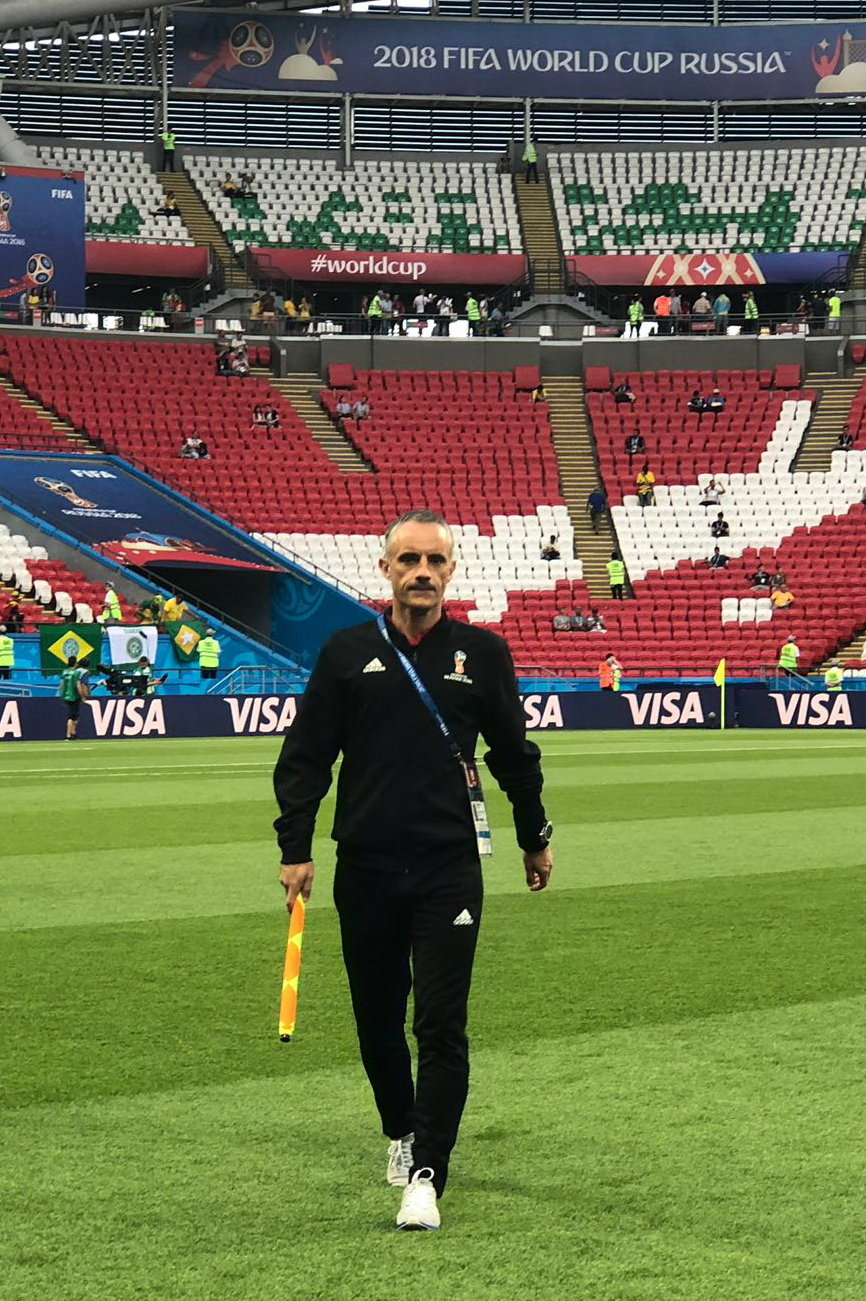
WC 2018 Brazil vs. Belgium, Kazan Arena

Đurđević referred to that match as one of the most demanding in his career, where the whole team had to make some big and hard decisions, like the 90th-minute goal from a “dead angle” that

Real brought to extra time. All of them had to be made without the Video Assistant Referee (it wasn't until next year when VAR was used in by UEFA).

=== 2017 FIFA Confederations Cup Final ===
FIFA also gave credits to this referee team with the privilege and the responsibility to officiate the 2017 FIFA Confederations Cup Final between Chile and Germany, played in Saint Petersburg on 2 July 2017. This was their first final with help of the VAR, which undoubtedly helped with a moment of controversy as Gonzalo Jara was judged to have elbowed Timo Werner in the face.

=== 2018 Champions League finals ===
On 26 May 2018, Mažić, Ristić and Đurđević refereed the 2018 UEFA Champions League Final between Liverpool and Real Madrid in Kyiv.

As an Assistant referee, Đurđević had an important call - a double offside in the 43rd minute. A retired UEFA elite match official referee Eduardo Iturralde González in one of his interviews on the Spanish radio commented that the call was entirely because Benzema was slightly offside and so was Cristiano Ronaldo.

This game symbolized the greatest success in the team's career, as Đurđević reflected on in one of his interviews. It was the result of 25 years of hard work. The referee team's performance was praised by Pierluigi Collina, the legend in the football referee circles and the head of UEFA referee committee at the time.

=== 2018 FIFA World Cup ===
As a crown of the team's career, The FIFA Referees Committee has selected Milorad Mažić, Milovan Ristić, and Dalibor Đurđević to be in the pool of 36 referees and 63 assistant referees for the 2018 FIFA World Cup Russia.

They were in charge of games between South Korea vs Mexico 1-2 (Rostov-on-Don, June 23), Senegal vs Colombia 0-1 (Samara, June 28), and quarterfinal between Brazil and Belgium 1-2 (Kazan, July 6).

They were the first candidate for the final match, but since Croatia played in the finals, FIFA tried to avoid any controversy with the Serbian referee team doing this game. Many Croatian fans and sports journalists posted on social media and in various sports news outlets that they wouldn't mind seeing Mažić, Ristić, and Đurđević in the Final and would choose them over Pitana’s team.

Despite the fact that the team didn’t get to referee the 2018 FIFA World Cup Final, they were unofficially proclaimed by football fans and professionals one of the best refereeing teams of the tournament.

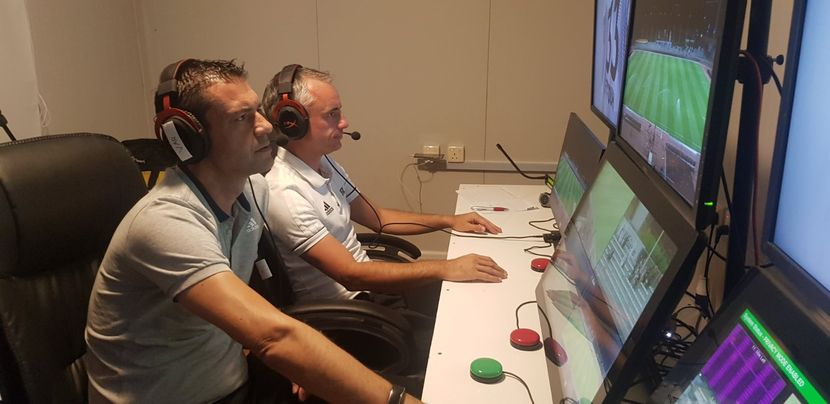
SAUDI PRO LEAGUE 2019 VAR: Viktor Kassai (HUN) and Dalibor Đurđević (SRB)

=== Last games as the team (2018-2019) ===
The next big game was on October 16, 2018, at Stade de France as France team came back from a goal down to beat Germany 2-1 in the UEFA Nations League.

Their appearance in Champions League play-offs was on where Benfica played with PAOK FC (1:1).

In the group stage they were in charge of PSV Eindhoven vs Inter Milan (1:2), Manchester United FC vs. Juventus FC (0:1) and FC Barcelona vs Tottenham Hotspur FC (1:1) on December 11, 2018, what was their last UEFA Champions League game.

On February 14, 2019, Mažić, Ristić, and Đurđević were in charge of the Round of 32 game UEFA Europa League FC Zürich vs SSC Napoli (1:3), which was their final international appearance as a team.

At the beginning of 2019 Mažić continued his professional career as the Chinese Football Association (CFA) referee, while Ristić and Đurđević became a part of the Saudi Professional League.

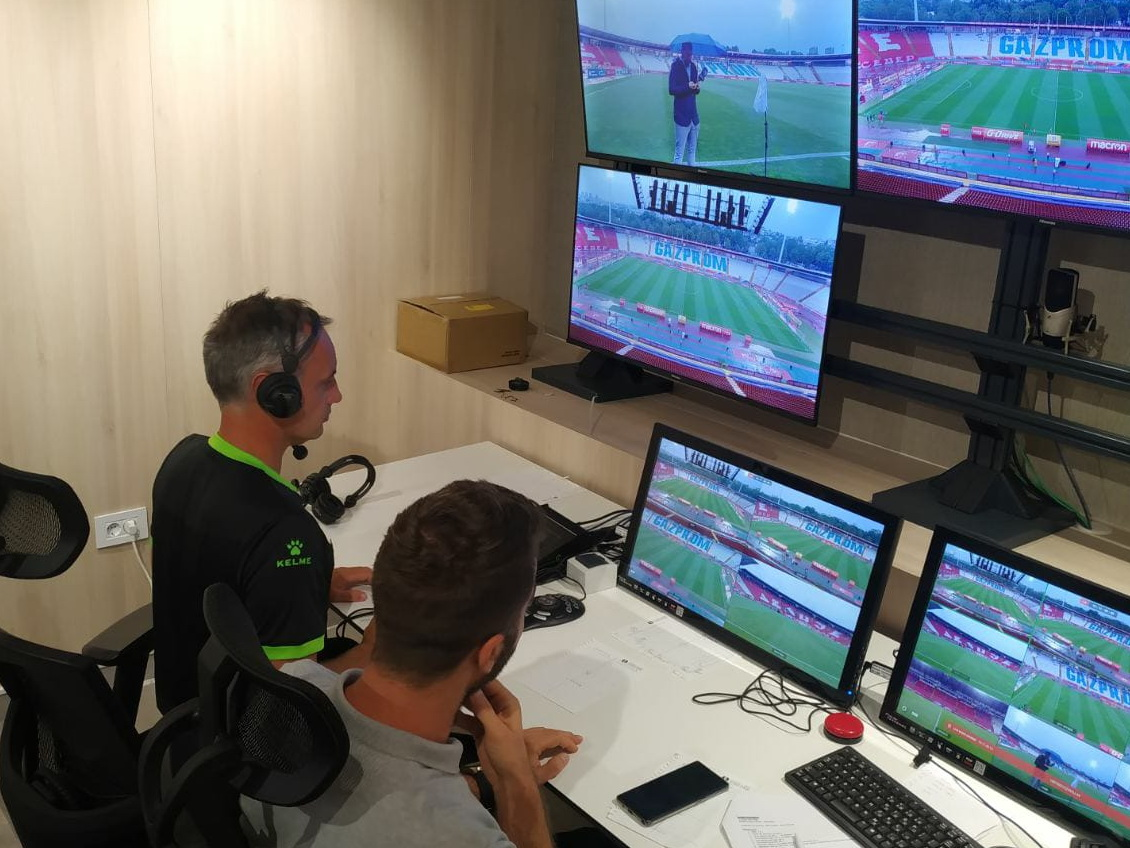
SERBIAN SUPERLIGA 2021 VAR: Video Assistant Referee: Dalibor Đurđević (SRB)

=== VAR - Video Assistant Referee ===
At the beginning of the implementation of video technology in football, Đurđević became FIFA-approved assistant video referee, and his first appearance was during the 2017 FIFA Confederations Cup in Russia.

After he ended his career as an assistant referee, in 2020, he became a FIFA VMO (Video Match Official).

As video technology became mainstream in the Serbian SuperLiga, he acted as VAR PRO referee until 2022, when he officially retired from his referee career there.

As VAR, Đurđević participated in UEFA Europa League, Serbian SuperLiga, Saudi Professional League, and Kuwait Premier League.

=== VAR Manager / Instructor ===
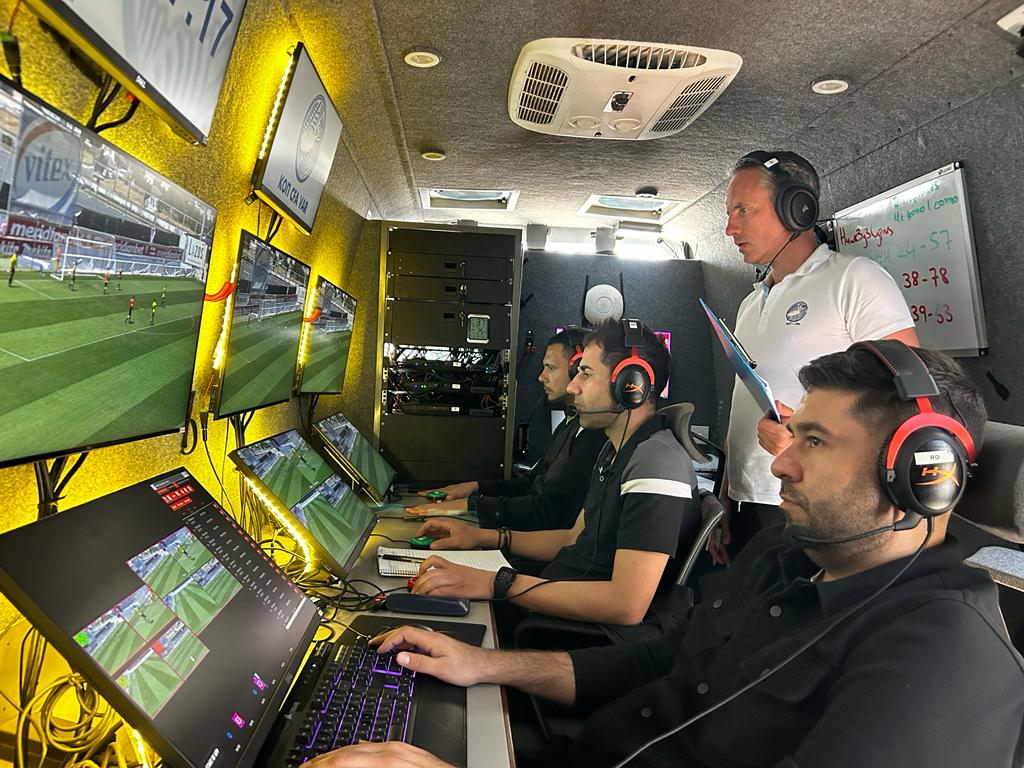
Cyprus Football Association: Referee VAR training (2022)

Cyprus Football Association: Referee VAR training (2021-2022)

He was hired by the Cyprus Football Association in 2021 as a FIFA VAR Instructor to assume the role of VAR Manager and Lead VMO (Video Match Official). After the achieved results, the President of the Cyprus Football Association, Giorgos Koumas, said that engaging Mažić, Ristić, and Đurđević was the best decision the federation had ever made.

Russian Football Union (2022-present)

In 2022, Đurđević was appointed as VAR Manager and Instructor at the Russian Football Union, where he became responsible for the development of the VAR system and the training of Russia's elite VMOs (Video Match Officials).

Shortly after assuming his new duties, he introduced several innovations to the Russian Premier League as part of FIFA's experimental program. Notably, he implemented the VAR announcement system and pioneered a world-first innovation in professional football: displaying the On-Field Review (OFR) on the stadium's big screen. This innovation received highly positive feedback from all stakeholders in Russian football.

International VAR development work

In addition to his work in Russia, Đurđević has served as a FIFA VMO instructor in several countries. Between 2023 and 2025, he was responsible for training and certifying VMOs in Belarus. In June 2025, he participated in the implementation of the VAR system in North Macedonia, where he served as Lead VMO Instructor, training the country's elite referees.

He continues to be actively involved in various referee mentorship and international VAR development programs.

=== Serbian Eternal Derby ===
Đurđević participated in 25 “Eternal Derbies” (a match between Red Star Belgrade and FK Partizan) during his 12-year career as a Serbian SuperLiga referee. The match is a long standing rivalry, known for crowd disruptions, fires, and overall unruliness that makes it difficult to officiate.

=== Referee education and humanitarian work ===
Đurđević is actively involved in various referee mentorship and talent development programs home and abroad.

He initiated and spearheaded a campaign backed by the Football Association of Serbia to raise funds and help Serbian health system in the current fight against COVID-19 pandemic.
