= Halkapınar Sport Hall =

Turkish indoor multi-purpose sports arena

Halkapınar Sports Hall
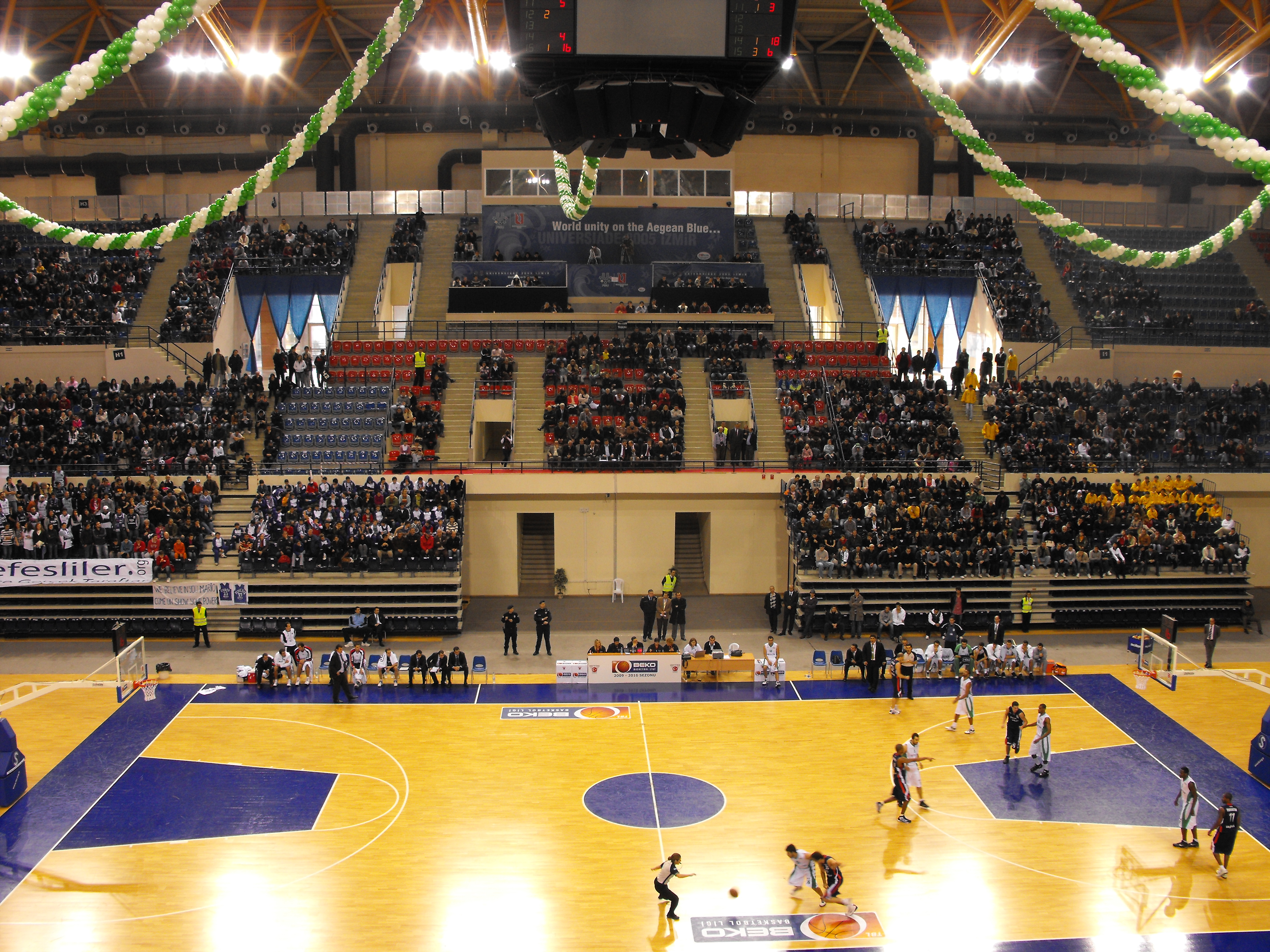
- Interactive map of Halkapınar Sports Hall
- Location: İzmir, Turkey
- Coordinates: 38°26′6″N 27°10′25″E
- Capacity: Basketball: 10,000

Construction
- Groundbreaking: 2004
- Opened: 2005
- Builder: Bozoğlu construction company

Halkapınar Sport Hall (Turkish: Halkapınar Spor Salonu) is an indoor multi-purpose sport venue that is located in the Halkapınar neighborhood of İzmir, Turkey. The hall has a seating capacity of 10,000 spectators.

== History ==
The project of the venue was prepared in 2002. Its construction began in December 2004, and the hall was put into service in June 2005 for the games of 2005 Summer Universiade. Bozoğlu construction company successfully finished the construction of Halkapınar Sport Hall in six months.

== International events hosted ==
Competitions in gymnastics, basketball, volleyball, and fencing are held in this modern hall. The site hosted the European Seniors Fencing Championship, which was held between July 4 and 9, 2006 in İzmir.

Volleyball at the 2008 Summer Olympics – Men's European qualification was contested from January 7 to 13, 2008.

The arena hosted Pool A, C and E matches of the 2009 Men's European Volleyball Championship.

The venue was used for hosting İzmir matches of 2010 FIBA World Championship for the matches of Group D.

Round-robin matches of 2011 Basketball World Cup were played between August 11–13, 2011.

== See also ==
- List of indoor arenas in Turkey
