= Spor Toto World Cup 10 =

The tenth edition of the World Cup tournament took place in İzmir, Turkey from August 11 to 13, 2011. The World Cup 9th edition was held in İzmir in 2011.

== Participating teams ==
- Germany
- Serbia
- Turkey
- Ukraine

=== Round-robin ===
Team	Pld	W	L	+	-	Pts
Germany	3	2	1	205	211	5
Serbia	3	2	1	224	174	5
Turkey	3	1	2	199	227	4
Ukraine	3	1	2	203	219	4

- All time UTC+2.

August 11
18:00

(Report)

Germany	59–58	Serbia
Scoring by quarter: 20-13, 10-16, 22-16, 7-13
Scoring by half: 30-29, 29-29
Pts: Robin Benzing (12); Rebs: Tibor Pleiß (7); Asts: Steffen Hamann (3)		Pts: Boban Marjanovic (11); Rebs: Stefan Markovic (7); Asts: Stefan Markovic (6)

Halkapınar Sport Hall, İzmir

August 11
20:30

(Report)

Turkey	69–65 (OT)	Ukraine
Scoring by quarter: 11-12, 27-11, 12-21, 8-14, Overtime: 11-7
Scoring by half: 38-23, 20-35 Overtime: 11-7
Pts: Cenk Akyol (13); Rebs: Ersan İlyasova - Furkan Aldemir (7); Asts: Kerem Tunçeri - Emir Preldžić (3)		Pts: Oleksiy Pecherov (18); Rebs: Oleksiy Pecherov (15); Asts: Steven Burtt (6)

Halkapınar Sport Hall, İzmir

August 12
18:00

(Report)

Serbia	83–57	Ukraine

Halkapınar Sport Hall, İzmir

August 12
20:30

(Report)

Germany	79–72	Turkey
Scoring by quarter: 21-20, 22-15, 20-21, 16-18
Scoring by half: 43-35, 36-39
Pts: Tibor Pleiß (20)		Pts: Ömer Onan (22)

Halkapınar Sport Hall, İzmir

August 13
18:00

(Report)

Ukraine	81–67	Germany
Scoring by quarter: 23-14, 23-20, 21-14, 14-19
Scoring by half: 46-34, 35-33

Halkapınar Sport Hall, İzmir

August 13
20:30

Turkey	58–83	Serbia
Scoring by quarter: 18-24, 14-19, 11-17, 15-23

Halkapınar Sport Hall, İzmir

== Final standings ==
Rank	Team	Record
Gold medal	Germany	2-1
Silver medal	Serbia	2-1
Bronze medal	Turkey	1-2
4th	Ukraine	1-2
