= 2011 Ex-Yu Cup =

Tournament details
- Arena: Arena Stožice; Ljubljana, Slovenia
- Dates: August 6–9

Final positions
- Champions: Serbia (2nd title)
- Runners-up: Croatia
- Third place: Slovenia
- Fourth place: Bosnia and Herzegovina

The 2011 Adecco Ex-Yu Cup was the first edition of this tournament, created with the aim to create a new Cup for the Ex-Yugoslavia countries.

Six teams played the inaugural edition in summer 2011. The inaugural edition was held in Arena Stožice from Ljubljana, Slovenia. The teams are divided in two groups of three teams. The top teams play the Final of the tournament.

== Venues ==
Ljubljana	Slovenia
Arena Stožice	2011 Ex-Yu Cup is located in Slovenia
Arena Stožice; Capacity: 12,480	2011 Ex-Yu Cup is located in Slovenia

== Participating teams ==
Group A	Group B
Bosnia and Herzegovina; North Macedonia; Serbia	Croatia; Montenegro; Slovenia

== Preliminary round ==
All times are local Central European Summer Time (UTC+2).

Qualified for the finals

=== Group A ===
Team	Pld	W	L	PF	PA	PD	Pts
Serbia	2	2	0	163	134	+29	4
Bosnia and Herzegovina	2	1	1	116	132	−16	3
North Macedonia	2	0	2	123	136	−13	2

August 6, 2011
18:00 CEST

Report

North Macedonia	50–55	Bosnia and Herzegovina
Scoring by quarter: 10–14, 13–15, 8–18, 19–8
Pts: Nikolovski, 13; Rebs: Samardžiski, 14; Asts: Four players, 3		Pts: Teletović, 19; Rebs: Đedović, 8 Asts: Nešović, 4

Arena Stožice, Ljubljana (Slovenia)
Attendance: 1,000

August 7, 2011
18:00 CEST

Report

Serbia	81–73	North Macedonia
Scoring by quarter: 29–18, 17–29, 17–15, 18–11
Pts: Savanović, 18; Rebs: Four players, 4 Asts: Teodosić, 7		Pts: Sokolov, 18; Rebs: Antić, 9 Asts: Ilievski, 7

Arena Stožice, Ljubljana (Slovenia)
Attendance: 1,000

August 8, 2011
18:00 CEST

Report

Bosnia and Herzegovina	61–82	Serbia
Scoring by quarter: 10–25, 19–24, 11–20, 21–13
Pts: Teletović, 18; Rebs: Teletović, 7 Asts: Bajramović, 3		Pts: Krstić, 16; Rebs: Mačvan, 9 Asts: Teodosić, 9

Arena Stožice, Ljubljana (Slovenia)
Attendance: 2,000

=== Group B ===
Qualified for the finals

Team	Pld	W	L	PF	PA	PD	Pts
Croatia	2	2	0	150	131	+19	4
Slovenia	2	1	1	146	144	+2	3
Montenegro	2	0	2	150	171	−21	2

August 6, 2011
21:00 CEST

Report

Croatia	85–71	Montenegro
Scoring by quarter: 18–20, 21–11, 25–29, 21–11
Pts: Bogdanović, 25; Rebs: Markota, Tomas, 7 Asts: Three players, 5		Pts: Dragičević, 19; Rebs: Peković, 8 Asts: Cook, 7

Arena Stožice, Ljubljana (Slovenia)
Attendance: 3,000

August 7, 2011
21:00 CEST

Report

Slovenia	86–79	Montenegro
Scoring by quarter: 19–22, 25–15, 16–24, 26–18
Pts: Lorbek, 14; Rebs: Z. Dragić, 6 Asts: G. Dragić, 8		Pts: Peković, 21; Rebs: Peković, 9 Asts: Jeretin, 4

Arena Stožice, Ljubljana (Slovenia)
Attendance: 5,500

August 8, 2011
21:00 CEST

Report

Slovenia	60–65	Croatia
Scoring by quarter: 16–15, 16–15, 16–21, 12–14
Pts: Lorbek, 14; Rebs: Lorbek, 7 Asts: Three players, 3		Pts: Simon, 15; Rebs: Tomić, 9 Asts: Draper, Simon, 3

Arena Stožice, Ljubljana (Slovenia)
Attendance: 7,000

== Final round ==
All times are local Central European Summer Time (UTC+2).

=== 5th place ===
August 9, 2011
15:00 CEST

Report

Montenegro	67–57	North Macedonia
Scoring by quarter: 19–20, 18–13, 21–12, 9–12
Pts: Dašić, 17; Rebs: Dašić, Peković, 5 Asts: Cook, 4		Pts: Antić, 17; Rebs: Antić, 6 Asts: McCalebb, 3

Arena Stožice, Ljubljana (Slovenia)
Attendance: 1,000

=== Third place ===
August 9, 2011
18:00 CEST

Report

Slovenia	59–52	Bosnia and Herzegovina
Scoring by quarter: 21–8, 12–22, 16–11, 10–11
Pts: Smodiš, 18; Rebs: Dragić, 13; Asts: Dragić, Udrih, 3		Pts: Teletović, 11; Rebs: Milošević, 6 Asts: Gordić, 3

Arena Stožice, Ljubljana (Slovenia)

=== Final ===
August 9, 2011
21:00 CEST

Report

Croatia	71–80	Serbia
Scoring by quarter: 21–18, 18–20, 21–15, 11–27
Pts: Bogdanović, 17; Rebs: Tomić, 14; Asts: Draper, 5		Pts: Savanović, 17; Rebs: Krstić, 8 Asts: Teodosić, 6

Arena Stožice, Ljubljana (Slovenia)
Attendance: 7,000

== Final standings ==
Pos	Team	Pld	W	L	PF	PA	PD	Pts
1st place, gold medalist(s)	Serbia	3	3	0	243	205	+38	6
2nd place, silver medalist(s)	Croatia	3	2	1	221	211	+10	5
3rd place, bronze medalist(s)	Slovenia	3	2	1	205	196	+9	5
4	Bosnia and Herzegovina	3	1	2	168	191	−23	4
5	Montenegro	3	1	2	217	228	−11	4
6	North Macedonia	3	0	3	180	203	−23	3

2011 Adecco Cup winners

Serbia
Second title
