= Croatia–Serbia football rivalry =

International football rivalry

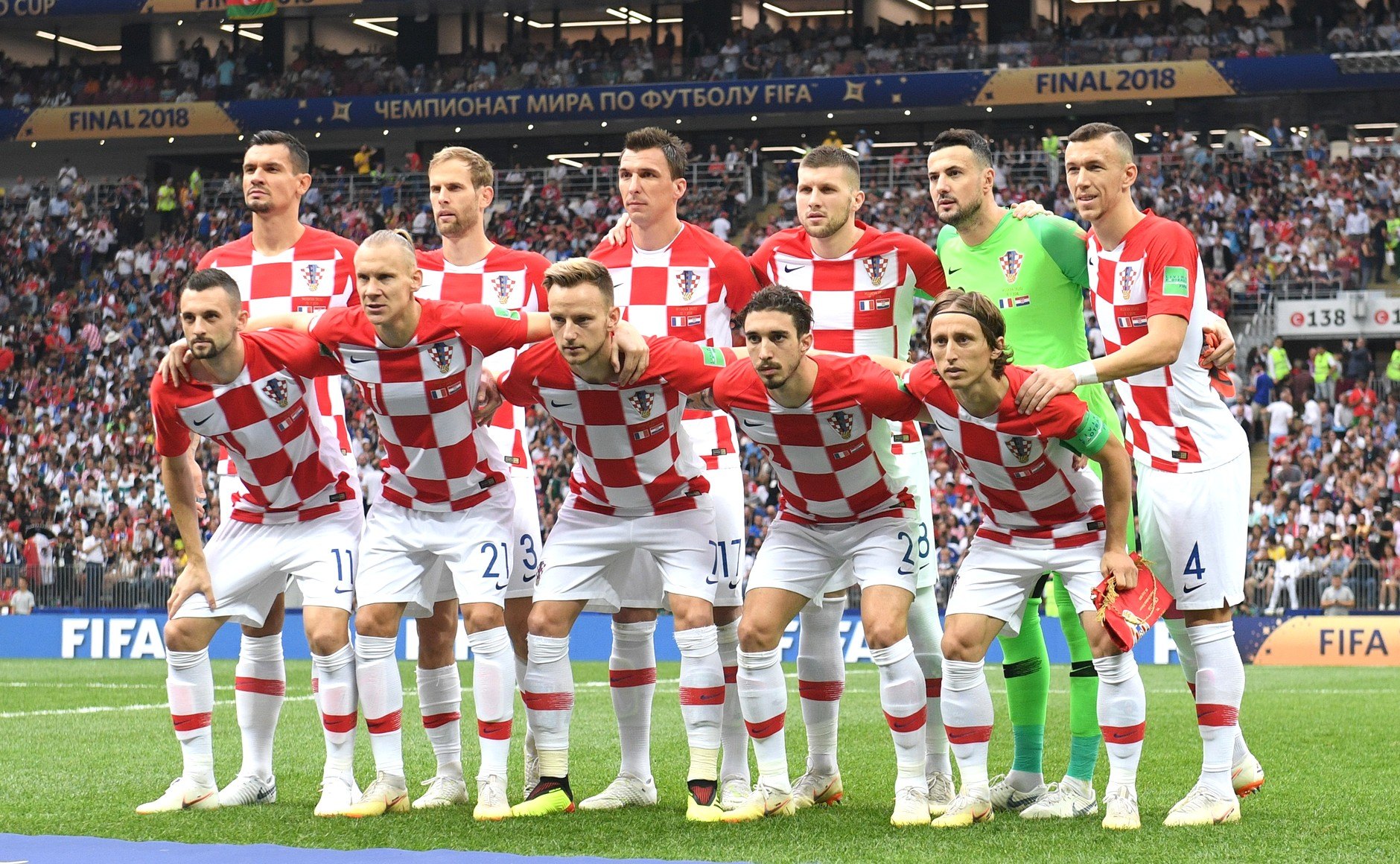
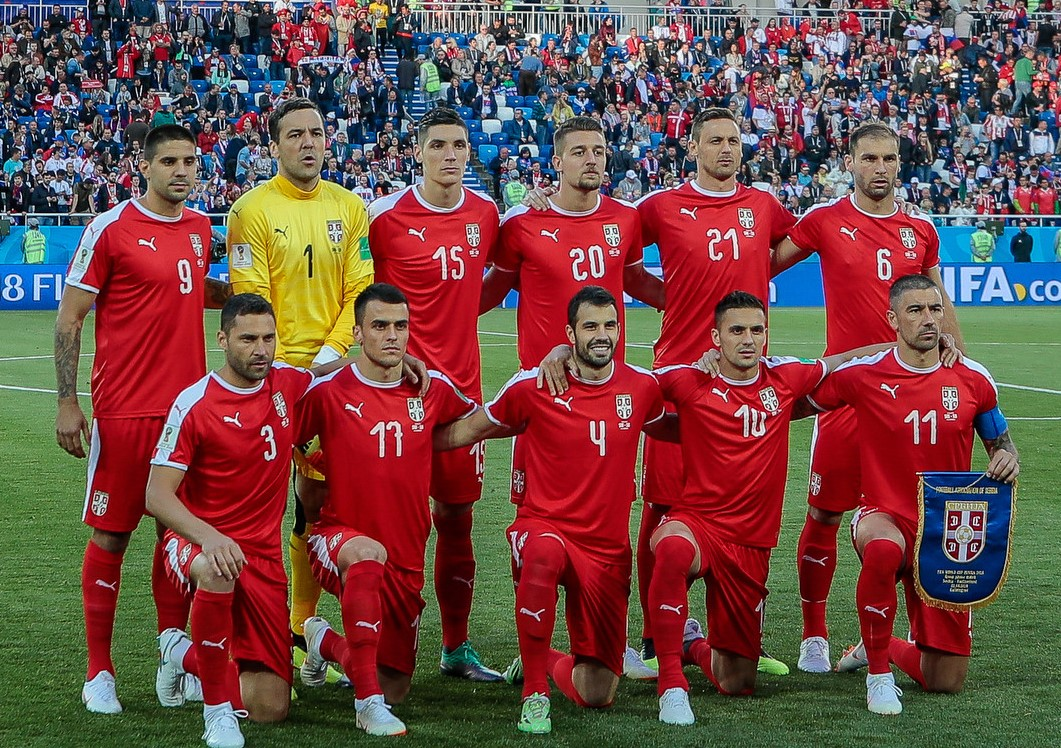
- Croatia (above) and Serbia (below), 2018 FIFA World Cup
- Location: Europe (UEFA)
- Teams: Croatia; Serbia
- First meeting: 18 August 1999; UEFA Euro 2000; FR Yugoslavia 0–0 Croatia
- Latest meeting: 6 September 2013; 2014 FIFA World Cup; Serbia 1–1 Croatia

Statistics
- Total meetings: 4
- Most wins: Croatia (1)
- Top scorer: (Croatia) Mario Mandžukić (2)
- All-time record: Croatia: 1 Draw: 3 Serbia: 0
- Largest victory: 22 March 2013; 2014 FIFA World Cup; Croatia 2–0 Serbia
- Largest goal scoring: 9 October 1999; UEFA Euro 2000; Croatia 2–2 FR Yugoslavia

The Croatia–Serbia football rivalry is a football rivalry between the national football teams of Croatia and Serbia. Both national sides are governed by UEFA in Europe, in addition to FIFA during their international matches.

Croatia and Serbia have met four times: twice in the UEFA Euro 2000 qualifying and twice during their 2014 FIFA World Cup qualification campaigns. It has received limited media attention for its perception of being one of the most hostile rivalries in world football due to their complex political history stemming from World War II and the breakup of Yugoslavia. The two rivals had previously both represented the Yugoslavia national football team, and contributed the bulk of the team's footballers during almost 70 years of its existence.

== History ==
=== Origins ===
The two countries first played in the semi-final of the one-off 1945 Yugoslav Football Tournament. The Home Championship/Victory International-style competition was played amongst six federal republics of Yugoslavia, one autonomous region and the Yugoslav People's Army team to mark the end of World War II. Serbia featured a team almost entirely composed of Red Star Belgrade players whilst Dinamo Zagreb was the primary contributor to the Croatian line-up. The match was played in Belgrade's 20th October Stadium with Serbia defeating Croatia 3–1, and progressing to the final where they beat the Army team 1–0. These matches are not formally recognized by FIFA or UEFA as this was a domestic tournament organised by the Football Association of Yugoslavia.

On 13 May 1990, Dinamo Zagreb hosted Red Star Belgrade at Stadion Maksimir in the Yugoslav First League. It was two weeks after Croatia's first election, in the middle of ethnic tensions in Yugoslavia. The game was interrupted after only ten minutes, as Dinamo's ultras Bad Blue Boys and Red Star's ultras Delije started an infamous riot. The incident is remembered for Dinamo's Zvonimir Boban kicking a Militia officer, after seeing him beating a Dinamo ultra. Boban was suspended for six months by the Football Association of Yugoslavia and expelled from the squad for the 1990 FIFA World Cup.

On 3 June 1990, a friendly match between Yugoslavia and the Netherlands took place at Stadion Maksimir and was the last friendly before the 1990 FIFA World Cup. The crowd of 20,000 booed the Yugoslav national anthem "Hey, Slavs". Fans cheered for the Netherlands, heckling the Yugoslav team and their manager Ivica Osim. Many Dutch flags were also seen in the crowd, owing to their similarity to the Croatian tricolour. The match was the last Yugoslavia match to be played at the stadium. On 17 October of that same year, Croatia played its first international match as a sovereign country, against the United States.

=== UEFA Euro 2000 qualifying ===
Croatia played against FR Yugoslavia (later renamed as Serbia and Montenegro) on 18 August 1999 at the Red Star Stadium in Belgrade, as part of UEFA Euro 2000 qualifying. The match ended as a goalless draw. The match remained memorable for a power outage at the stadium that allegedly intimidated the Croatian players. The return game at Stadion Maksimir in Zagreb was played on 9 October 1999 and it was a decisive match for Croatia, as they needed a victory to qualify for the tournament. Ten minutes into the game, Aljoša Asanović passed the ball to Davor Šuker who took a shot, but Ivica Kralj rebounded it. Even though the ball was over the goal line, Spanish referee José María García-Aranda ruled the goal out. In 20th minute, Alen Bokšić opened the scoreline. Yugoslavia came from behind with goals by Predrag Mijatović and Dejan Stanković in 26th and 31st respective minute. In a contest between Zoran Mirković and Robert Jarni, the former grabbed the latter and received a red card. The incident motivated Croatia even more resulting in Mario Stanić's equalizer in 47th minute, drawing the match.

=== 2014 FIFA World Cup qualification ===
Croatia and now-independent Serbia met for the first time after nearly 70 years since their first encounter in the 2014 FIFA World Cup qualification. The first match was played on 22 March 2013 at Stadion Maksimir and ended up as a 2–0 victory for Croatia following goals by Mario Mandžukić and Ivica Olić. The return game was played on 6 September 2013 at the Red Star Stadium and ended up as a 1–1 draw. Croatia took the lead after Mandžukić scored in 53rd minute but Serbia equalized in 66th minute through Aleksandar Mitrović. In 80th minute, Josip Šimunić tackled Miralem Sulejmani as the latter was running towards Croatia's goal. As a result, he received a red card. Croatia finished the qualification as the group runners-up and went on to beat Iceland 2–0 on aggregate in the play-offs. Serbia ended up third in the group with three points less than Croatia and subsequently did not qualify for the tournament.

== Matches ==
18 August 1999
20:30 UTC+2
UEFA Euro 2000 qualifying

FR Yugoslavia	0–0	Croatia
	Report

Red Star Stadium, Belgrade
Attendance: 48,282
Referee: Kim Milton Nielsen (Denmark)

9 October 1999
19:30 UTC+2
UEFA Euro 2000 qualifying

Croatia	2–2	FR Yugoslavia
Bokšić 20'; Stanić 47'	Report	Mijatović 26'; Stanković 31'

Stadion Maksimir, Zagreb
Attendance: 38,743
Referee: José María García-Aranda (Spain)

22 March 2013
18:00 UTC+1
2014 FIFA World Cup qualification

Croatia	2–0	Serbia
Mandžukić 23'; Olić 37'	Report

Stadion Maksimir, Zagreb
Attendance: 35,722
Referee: Cüneyt Çakır (Turkey)

6 September 2013
20:45 UTC+2
2014 FIFA World Cup qualification

Serbia	1–1	Croatia
Mitrović 66'	Report	Mandžukić 53'

Red Star Stadium, Belgrade
Attendance: 30,000
Referee: Felix Brych (Germany)

=== Statistics ===
Competition	Croatia Wins	Draws	Serbia Wins
Total	1	3	0

== Top scorers ==
- (Croatia) Mario Mandžukić (2 goals)
- (Croatia) Alen Bokšić (1 goal)
- (Federal Republic of Yugoslavia) Predrag Mijatović (1 goal)
- (Serbia) Aleksandar Mitrović (1 goal)
- (Croatia) Ivica Olić (1 goal)
- (Croatia) Mario Stanić (1 goal)
- (Federal Republic of Yugoslavia) Dejan Stanković (1 goal)

== Comparison in major international tournaments ==
Key

Denotes which team finished better in that particular competition.

Tournament	Croatia	FR Yugoslavia	Notes
(Sweden) UEFA Euro 1992	Not a FIFA member	Suspended	Yugoslavia qualified but was banned from international sports tournaments as part of United Nations Security Council Resolution 757.
(United States) 1994 FIFA World Cup	Not a FIFA member	Suspended	Yugoslavia qualified but was banned from international sports tournaments as part of United Nations Security Council Resolution 757.
(England) UEFA Euro 1996	7th	Suspended	Yugoslavia qualified but was banned from international sports tournaments as part of United Nations Security Council Resolution 757.
(France) 1998 FIFA World Cup	3rd	10th	In the quarter-finals, Croatia eliminated Germany, who had previously drawn with Yugoslavia in the group stage. In the third place play-off, Croatia defeated the Netherlands, who had previously eliminated Yugoslavia in the round of 16.
(Belgium) (Netherlands) UEFA Euro 2000	Did not qualify	8th	Yugoslavia denied Croatia's qualification to the tournament following a goalless draw in Belgrade and a 2–2 draw in Zagreb, as Croatia needed a win in Zagreb to qualify.
(South Korea) (Japan) 2002 FIFA World Cup	23rd	Did not qualify	
(Portugal) UEFA Euro 2004	13th	Serbia and Montenegro	
(Portugal) UEFA Euro 2004	13th	Did not qualify	
(Germany) 2006 FIFA World Cup	22nd	32nd	
(Austria) (Switzerland) UEFA Euro 2008	5th	Serbia	
(Austria) (Switzerland) UEFA Euro 2008	5th	Did not qualify	
(South Africa) 2010 FIFA World Cup	Did not qualify	23rd	
(Poland) (Ukraine) UEFA Euro 2012	10th	Did not qualify	
(Brazil) 2014 FIFA World Cup	19th	Did not qualify	Croatia and Serbia were drawn in the same qualifying group. Following a 2–0 win in Zagreb and a 1–1 draw in Belgrade, Croatia ended the qualification as the group runner-up with three points ahead of third-placed Serbia.
(France) UEFA Euro 2016	9th	Did not qualify	
(Russia) 2018 FIFA World Cup	2nd	23rd	
(Portugal) 2018–19 UEFA Nations League	9th	27th	
(Europe) UEFA Euro 2020	14th	Did not qualify	
(Italy) 2020–21 UEFA Nations League	12th	27th	
(Qatar) 2022 FIFA World Cup	3rd	29th	In the quarter-finals, Croatia eliminated Brazil, who had previously defeated Serbia in the group stage.
(Netherlands) 2022–23 UEFA Nations League	2nd	19th	
(Germany) UEFA Euro 2024	20th	19th	Serbia qualified to the European Championships for the first time in their history as an independent nation.
(Germany) 2024–25 UEFA Nations League	8th	9th	
(Canada) (Mexico) (United States) 2026 FIFA World Cup	20th	Did not qualify	
(Belgium) 2026–27 UEFA Nations League	TBD	TBD	

== See also ==
- Croatia–Serbia diplomatic relations
- Croatia–Serbia basketball rivalry
- Albania–Serbia football rivalry
