= 2012 Ex-Yu Cup =

Tournament details
- Arena: Arena Stožice; Ljubljana, Slovenia
- Dates: August 3–5

Final positions
- Champions: Serbia (3rd title)
- Runners-up: Bosnia and Herzegovina
- Third place: Slovenia
- Fourth place: Croatia

The 2012 Adecco Ex-Yu Cup was the second edition of this tournament, created with the aim to create a new Cup for the Ex-Yugoslavia countries. Only four teams played in second edition. Macedonia, who played the Olympic Qualifying Tournament, and Montenegro withdrew of the competition. The tournament was held at the Slovenian Arena Stožice once again.

== Venues ==
| Ljubljana | Slovenia |
|---|---|
| Arena Stožice | 2012 Ex-Yu Cup is located in Slovenia |
| Arena Stožice; Capacity: 12,480 | 2012 Ex-Yu Cup is located in Slovenia |

== Participating teams ==
- Slovenia
- Bosnia and Herzegovina
- Croatia
- Serbia

== Standings ==
| Team | Pld | W | L | PF | PA | PD | Pts |
|---|---|---|---|---|---|---|---|
| Serbia | 3 | 3 | 0 | 271 | 240 | +31 | 6 |
| Bosnia and Herzegovina | 3 | 2 | 1 | 249 | 248 | +1 | 5 |
| Slovenia | 3 | 1 | 2 | 237 | 236 | +1 | 4 |
| Croatia | 3 | 0 | 3 | 218 | 251 | −33 | 3 |

== Results ==
All times are local Central European Summer Time (UTC+2).

Sport Klub

August 3, 2012
18:00 CEST

Stats

| Croatia | 74–90 | Serbia |
Scoring by quarter: 16–23, 23–22, 14–21, 21–24
| Pts: Ukić 14; Rebs: Markota 6 Asts: Ukić 4 | | Pts: Erceg, Teodosić 14; Rebs: Štimac, Tepić 6 Asts: Teodosić 9 |

Arena Stožice, Ljubljana (Slovenia)
Referees: Boltauzer, Špendl, Krejić

Sport Klub

August 3, 2012
20:45 CEST

Stats

| Slovenia | 79–80 | Bosnia and Herzegovina |
Scoring by quarter: 19–31, 27–21, 17–17, 16–11
| Pts: Vidmar 15; Rebs: Vidmar 6 Asts: D. Lorbek 4 | | Pts: Teletović 22; Rebs: Teletović 8 Asts: Wright 9 |

Arena Stožice, Ljubljana (Slovenia)
Referees: Gajšek, Rener, Antolović

Sport Klub

August 4, 2012
18:00 CEST

Stats

| Serbia | 101–91 | Bosnia and Herzegovina |
Scoring by quarter: 24–18, 21–23, 26–27, 30–23
| Pts: Teodosić 29; Rebs: Tepić 6 Asts: Teodosić 11 | | Pts: Kikanović 21; Rebs: Wright 7 Asts: Wright 11 |

Arena Stožice, Ljubljana (Slovenia)
Referees: Lovšin, Antolović, Zovko

Sport Klub

August 4, 2012
20:45 CEST

Stats

| Slovenia | 83–76 | Croatia |
Scoring by quarter: 26–17, 21–21, 18–22, 18–16
| Pts: D. Lorbek 22; Rebs: Vidmar 7 Asts: Murič, Rojc 3 | | Pts: Žorić 17; Rebs: Markota 4 Asts: Ukić 5 |

Arena Stožice, Ljubljana (Slovenia)
Referees: Špendl, Krejić, Bolka

Sport Klub

August 5, 2012
18:00 CEST

Report

| Slovenia | 75–80 | Serbia |
Scoring by quarter: 17–19, 17–20, 16–26, 25–15
| Pts: Z. Dragić 18; Rebs: Krušič 11; Asts: Rojc 4 | | Pts: Nedović 15; Rebs: Ilić, Mačvan 5 Asts: Erceg, Rašić 4 |

Arena Stožice, Ljubljana (Slovenia)
Attendance: 3,000
Referees: Petek, Majkič, Gajšek

Sport Klub

August 5, 2012
20:45 CEST

Stats

| Bosnia and Herzegovina | 78–68 | Croatia |
Scoring by quarter: 11–18, 18–13, 27–21, 22–16
| Pts: Teletović 25; Rebs: Wright 9 Asts: Đedović 4 | | Pts: Markota 17; Rebs: Simon 13; Asts: Simon 6 |

Arena Stožice, Ljubljana (Slovenia)
Referees: Lovšin, Česen, Vuga

== Final standing ==
| Rank | Team |
|---|---|
| 1st place, gold medalist(s) | Serbia |
| 2nd place, silver medalist(s) | Bosnia and Herzegovina |
| 3rd place, bronze medalist(s) | Slovenia |
| 4 | Croatia |

2012 Adecco Ex-Yu Cup winners

Serbia
Third title
