= Davor Pejčinović =

Croatian basketball player

Personal information
- Born: 28 March 1971 (age 55) Altenkirchen, West Germany
- Listed height: 2.11 m (6 ft 11 in)

Career information
- Playing career: 1991–2008
- Position: Center

Career history
- 1991–1997: Cibona Zagreb
- 1997–1998: Karlovac
- 1998–1999: Kusadasi
- 1999–2000: Cibona Zagreb
- 2000: HKK Široki
- 2000–2001: Zadar
- 2001: Budućnost Podgorica
- 2002: Pallacanestro Varese
- 2002: Élan Béarnais Pau-Orthez
- 2002–2003: BC Kyiv
- 2003–2004: Bashkimi Prizren
- 2004–2005: Shanghai Sharks
- 2005: Olympia Larissa
- 2006: Helios Domžale
- 2006: Keravnos
- 2006: Dubrava
- 2007–2008: Zrinjevac

Career highlights
- 2× Croatian League champion (1992, 1993)

Davor Pejčinović (born 28 March 1971) is a retired Croatian basketball player. A 2.11 m center, he participated in the 2000-01 Euroleague with KK Zadar.

Pejčinović was a member of the Croatian national team that won the bronze medal in the 1995 Eurobasket.
