= Efes Pilsen World Cup 9 =

Basketball tournament in Turkey

The Efes Pilsen World Cup 9 was an international basketball tournament played in Turkey in August 2010. There were four teams: Argentina, Turkey, Lebanon and Canada, and the winning team was Argentina.

== Round-robin ==
| Team | Pld | W | L | PF | PA | PD | Pts |
|---|---|---|---|---|---|---|---|
| Argentina | 3 | 3 | 0 | 261 | 235 | +26 | 6 |
| Turkey | 3 | 2 | 1 | 266 | 218 | +48 | 5 |
| Lebanon | 3 | 1 | 2 | 242 | 258 | -16 | 4 |
| Canada | 3 | 0 | 3 | 193 | 251 | -58 | 3 |

- All time UTC+3.

August 21
17:30

| Argentina | 79–64 | Canada |
Scoring by quarter: 16–20, 13–15, 22–14, 28–15

Ankara Arena, Ankara

August 21
20:15

| Turkey | 93–72 | Lebanon |
Scoring by quarter: 24–11, 23–24, 23–17, 23–20
| Pts: Ömer Aşık 20; Rebs: Ömer Aşık 7 Asts: Ömer Onan, Kerem Tunçeri 6 | | Pts: Matt Freije 18; Rebs: Jackson Vroman 11; Asts: Rony Fahed 5 |

Ankara Arena, Ankara

August 22
17:30

| Argentina | 89–82 | Lebanon |
Scoring by quarter: 26–18, 23–22, 21–18, 19–24
| Pts: Luis Scola 19; Rebs: Luis Scola 8 Asts: Pablo Prigioni, Fabricio Oberto 6 | | Pts: Matt Freije 27; Rebs: Jackson Vroman 10; Asts: Fadi El Khatib 5 |

Ankara Arena, Ankara

August 22
20:15

| Turkey | 84–53 | Canada |
Scoring by quarter: 28–13, 17–15, 23–5, 16–20
| Pts: Ömer Onan 17; Rebs: Oğuz Savaş 8 Asts: Semih Erden, Kerem Tunçeri, Ender Arslan, Sinan Güler 3 | | Pts: Kelly Olynyk 9 Rebs: Aaron Doormekamp 10; Asts: Denham Brown 4 |

Ankara Arena, Ankara

August 23
19:00

| Lebanon | 88–76 | Canada |
Scoring by quarter: 18–16, 16–11, 27–30, 27–19
| Pts: Jackson Vroman 17; Rebs: Matt Freije 8 Asts: Rony Fahed 7 | | Pts: Oli Famutimi 20; Rebs: Denham Brown 9 Asts: Denham Brown 7 |

Ankara Arena, Ankara

August 23
21:30

| Turkey | 89–93 (OT) | Argentina |
Scoring by quarter: 19-20, 20-16, 22-16, 20-29, Overtime: 8-12
| Pts: Semih Erden 15; Rebs: Ömer Aşık 9 Asts: Ender Arslan 5 | | Pts: Carlos Delfino 30; Rebs: Carlos Delfino 8 Asts: Pablo Prigioni 13 |

Ankara Arena, Ankara

== Final standings ==
| Rank | Team | Record |
|---|---|---|
| Gold medal | Argentina | 3-0 |
| Silver medal | Turkey | 2-1 |
| Bronze medal | Lebanon | 1-2 |
| 4th | Canada | 0-3 |

== See also ==
- Basketball World Cup
