= Mate Skelin =

Croatian basketball player and coach

Cedevita Junior
- Title: Assistant coach
- League: Croatian League

Personal information
- Born: 13 December 1974 (age 51) Zagreb, SR Croatia, SFR Yugoslavia
- Listed height: 6 ft 11 in (2.11 m)

Career information
- NBA draft: 1996: undrafted
- Playing career: 1993–2009
- Position: Center
- Coaching career: 2021–present

Career history

Playing
- 1993–1995: Dona
- 1995–1999: Cibona
- 1999–2000: CSKA Moscow
- 2000–2001: Cibona
- 2001–2002: Krka Novo Mesto
- 2002–2003: Fortitudo Bologna
- 2003–2004: Pau-Orthez
- 2004–2005: Le Mans
- 2005–2006: Cibona
- 2006: Le Mans
- 2007: Akademik Sofia
- 2007–2008: Pallacanestro Varese
- 2009: Keravnos

Coaching
- 2021–present: Cedevita Junior (assistant)

Mate Skelin (born December 13, 1974) and is a Croatian basketball coach and former player who is an assistant coach for Cedevita Junior of the Croatian League.

== Post-playing career ==
In 2015, Cedevita head coach Veljko Mrsic named Skelin as the team manager in his staff. In 2017, new Cedevita coach Jure Zdovc confirmed Skelin to team manager until the end of his contract.

In August 2021, Skelin was named an assistant coach for Cedevita Junior.
