= Vladimir Krstić (basketball) =

Croatian basketball player and coach

KB Vëllaznimi
- Title: Head coach
- League: Kosovo Superleague

Personal information
- Born: 27 July 1972 (age 54) Osijek, SR Croatia, SFR Yugoslavia
- Listed height: 1.84 m (6 ft 0 in)

Career information
- Playing career: 1990–2011
- Position: Point guard
- Coaching career: 2014–present

Career history

Playing
- 1990–1991: Olimpija Osijek
- 1991–1992: Steiner Bayreuth
- 1992–1993: Olimpija Osijek
- 1993–1994: Split
- 1994–1998: Olimpija Osijek
- 1998–2000: Cibona
- 2000–2001: Anwil Włocławek
- 2001: Élan Béarnais Pau-Orthez
- 2001–2002: Pallacanestro Varese
- 2002–2003: Lietuvos rytas
- 2003: Zadar
- 2003–2004: Anwil Włocławek
- 2004–2005: Cibona
- 2005–2006: Menorca Bàsquet
- 2006–2007: Olympia Larissas
- 2007–2008: Kyiv
- 2008–2009: Aigaleo
- 2009–2010: Zagreb
- 2010–2011: Cedevita

Coaching
- 2014–2019: Vrijednosnice
- 2019–2022: Furnir
- 2022–23: Gorica
- 2024-present: Vëllaznimi

Career highlights
- As player: 2× Croatian League champion (1999, 2000); Croatian Cup winner (1998)

Vladimir Krstić (born 27 July 1972) is a Croatian professional basketball coach and former player who is the head coach for Vëllaznimi of the Kosovo Superleague.

== Professional career ==
Krstić, an Osijek native, started his career in his hometown club Olimpija Osijek. After leaving Osijek, Krstić played for series of clubs all around Europe - Steiner Bayreuth, Cibona Zagreb, Anwil Wloclawek, Pau Orthez, Metis Varese, Lietuvos rytas, KK Zadar, Lianera Menorca, Olimpia Larissa, BC Kyiv, Aigaleo, KK Zagreb and Cedevita Zagreb.

== Coaching career ==
In December 2014, Krstić took over as a head coach of Croatian first division club KK Vrijednosnice Osijek. On 9 January 2019, Krstić and Vrijednosnice parted ways.

In September 2017, he became an assistant coach of Croatia national team in staff of Ivica Skelin. He left the staff in 2019.

On 19 November 2019, Krstić was named the new head coach for Dubrava Furnir of the Croatian League.

In July 2022, Gorica hired Krstić as their new head coach.
