= Josip Vranković =

Croatian basketball player, coach, and executive

Personal information
- Born: 26 October 1968 (age 58) Split, SR Croatia, SFR Yugoslavia
- Listed height: 2.00 m (6 ft 6 1/2 in)
- Listed weight: 100 kg (220 lb)

Career information
- Playing career: 1989–2006
- Position: Shooting guard
- Coaching career: 2007–present

Career history

Playing
- 1989–1990: Dalvin
- 1990–1991: Alkar
- 1991–1997: Split
- 1997–1998: Zadar
- 1998–2000: Cibona
- 2000–2003: Prokom Trefl Sopot
- 2003: EnBW Ludwigsburg
- 2004–2005: Cibona
- 2005–2006: Široki

Coaching
- 2007: Široki
- 2009–2011: Croatia
- 2011: Cibona
- 2013: Türk Telekom
Medals
Men's basketball
Representing Croatia
FIBA World Cup
Bronze medal – third place	1994 Canada
EuroBasket
Bronze medal – third place	1995 Greece

Josip-Jerko "Joke" Vranković (pronounced [ˈjɔsip ˈjɛrko ˈjɔkɛ ˈʋraːŋkoʋitɕ]; born 26 October 1968) is a Croatian basketball executive, coach and former player. He has served as the secretary general of the Croatian Basketball Federation (HKS) since 2018.
