= Adecco Cup =

International basketball competition

- Sport: Basketball
- Founded: 2009; 17 years ago
- No. of teams: 3
- Continent: Europe
- Most recent champion: Slovenia (6th title)
- Most titles: Slovenia (6 titles)
- Broadcaster: RTV Slovenija

The Adecco Cup (Slovene: Pokal Adecco), also known as the Adecco Ex-Yu Cup in 2011 and 2012, is an international basketball friendly competition. The tournament is sponsored by Adecco and is played under FIBA rules.

== History ==
Year	Host country	Venue	Winner	Runner-up
2009	Slovenia	Tabor Hall	Slovenia	Greece
2010	Slovenia	Tabor Hall	Serbia	Slovenia
2011	Slovenia	Arena Stožice	Serbia	Croatia
2012	Slovenia	Arena Stožice	Serbia	Bosnia and Herzegovina
2013	Slovenia	Arena Bonifika	Slovenia	Italy
2014	Slovenia	Multiple venues	Slovenia	Canada
2015	Slovenia	Arena Bonifika	Slovenia	Ukraine
2016	Slovenia	Zlatorog Arena	Slovenia	Belgium
2017	Slovenia	Tabor Hall	Slovenia	Czech Republic

== Participation details ==
Team	2009 (Slovenia)	2010 (Slovenia)	2011 (Slovenia)	2012 (Slovenia)	2013 (Slovenia)	2014 (Slovenia)	2015 (Slovenia)	2016 (Slovenia)	2017 (Slovenia)
Bulgaria	3rd	—	—	—	—	—	—	—	—
Belgium	—	—	—	—	—	—	—	2nd	—
Bosnia and Herzegovina	—	—	4th	2nd	—	—	—	3rd	—
Canada	—	—	—	—	—	2nd	—	—	—
Croatia	—	—	2nd	4th	—	—	—	—	—
Czech Republic	—	—	—	—	—	—	—	—	2nd
Finland	—	—	—	—	—	—	4th	—	—
Georgia	—	—	—	—	—	3rd	—	—	—
Greece	2nd	—	—	—	—	—	—	—	—
Hungary	—	—	—	—	—	—	—	—	3rd
Italy	—	—	—	—	2nd	—	3rd	—	—
North Macedonia	—	—	6th	—	—	—	—	—	—
Montenegro	—	—	5th	—	3rd	—	—	—	—
New Zealand	—	4th	—	—	—	—	—	—	—
Portugal	—	—	—	—	—	—	—	4th	—
Russia	—	3rd	—	—	—	—	—	—	—
Serbia	—	1st	1st	1st	—	—	—	—	—
Slovenia	1st	2nd	3rd	3rd	1st	1st	1st	1st	1st
Ukraine	—	—	—	—	—	4th	2nd	—	—

== See also ==
- Acropolis Tournament
- Basketball at the Summer Olympics
- FIBA Basketball World Cup
- FIBA Asia Cup
- FIBA Diamond Ball
- Marchand Continental Championship Cup
- Belgrade Trophy
- Stanković Cup
- William Jones Cup
