= Matej Mamić =

Croatian basketball player

Personal information
- Born: January 13, 1975 (age 51) Tomislavgrad, SFR Yugoslavia (now Bosnia and Herzegovina)
- Listed height: 2.00 m (6 ft 7 in)

Career information
- Playing career: 1995–2005
- Position: Small forward

Career history
- 1995–1996: Split
- 1996–1998: Kvarner
- 1998–1999: Split
- 1999–2000: Galatasaray
- 2000–2004: Cibona
- 2004–2005: Alba Berlin

Career highlights
- German Bundesliga Best Defender (2005)

Matej Mamić (born 13 January 1975) is a retired Croatian professional basketball player.

He last worked as a sports director in Cedevita. As a player, Mamić played as small forward and played for clubs in his native country Croatia, as well as in Germany and Turkey.
