= Stanko Barać =

Croatian basketball player (born 1986)

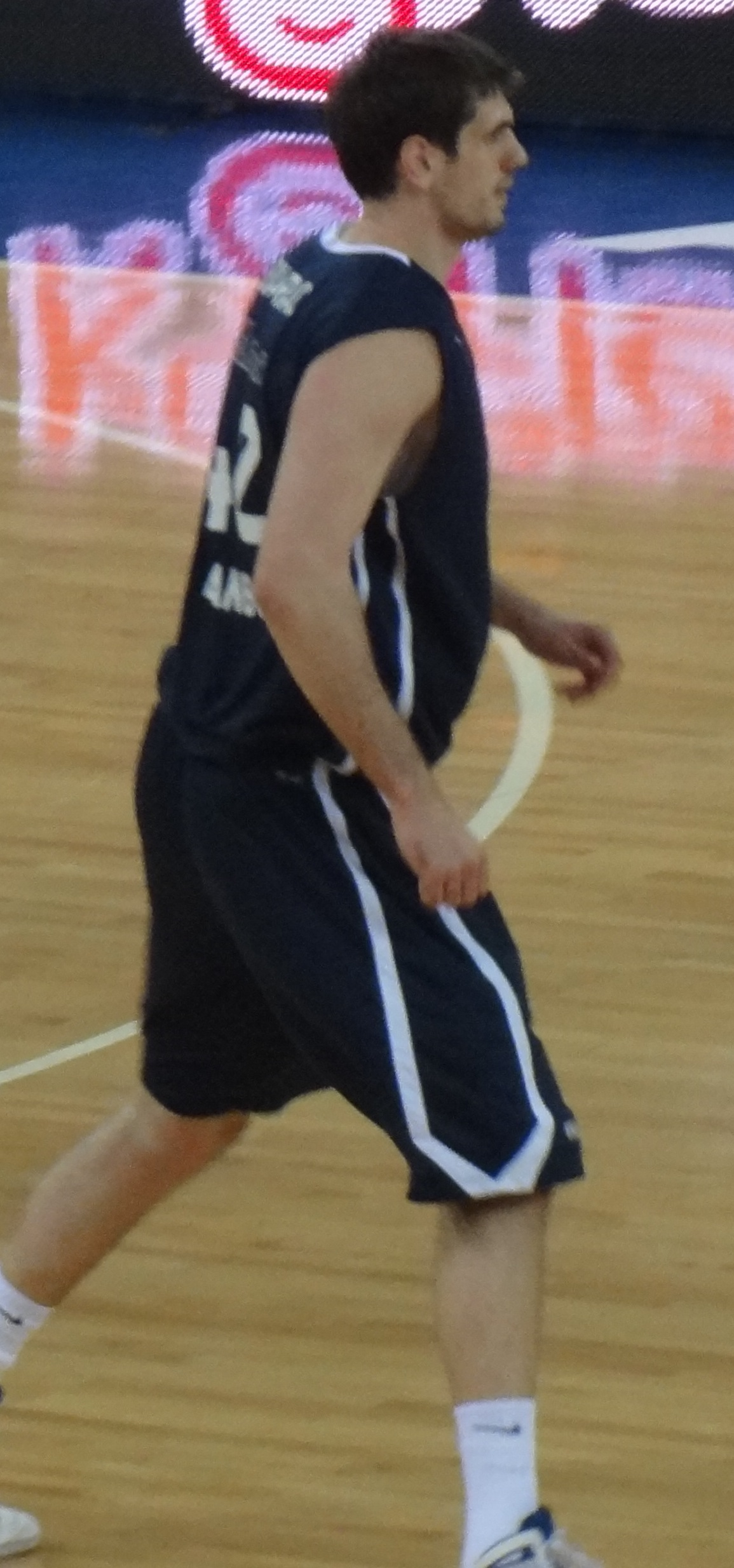
- Barać with Anadolu Efes

Personal information
- Born: 13 August 1986 (age 40) Mostar, SR Bosnia-Herzegovina, SFR Yugoslavia
- Listed height: 7 ft 1.25 in (2.17 m)
- Listed weight: 279 lb (127 kg)

Career information
- NBA draft: 2007: 2nd round, 39th overall pick
- Drafted by: Miami Heat
- Playing career: 2005–2016
- Position: Center

Career history
- 2005–2007: Široki Prima pivo
- 2007–2011: Saski Baskonia
- 2007–2008: →Pamesa Valencia
- 2011–2014: Anadolu Efes
- 2015: Cedevita
- 2015–2016: EA7 Emporio Armani Milano

Career highlights
- Bosnian League champion (2007); Spanish League champion (2010); Croatian League champion (2015); Italian League champion (2016); Bosnian Cup winner (2006); Spanish Cup winner (2009); Spanish Superup winner (2008); Croatian Cup winner (2015); Italian Cup winner (2016)
- Stats at Basketball Reference

Stanko Barać (born 13 August 1986) is a retired Croatian professional basketball player.

== Professional career ==
=== Early years ===
Barać was born in Mostar, Bosnia and Herzegovina and he started his basketball career with the team Široki Prima pivo, from Široki Brijeg, Bosnia and Herzegovina.

He was selected by the Miami Heat as the 39th overall pick in the 2007 NBA draft and was traded to the Indiana Pacers. In July 2016 they passed their rights to the Dallas Mavericks.

=== Spanish League ===
Barać remained in Europe, signing a five-year contract with Saski Baskonia, then known as TAU Cerámica, in August 2007. In the October of that year, just before the start of the European season, Saski Baskonia loaned him out to another ACB team, Pamesa Valencia for the 2007–08 season. He returned to Saski Baskonia the following season, and In November 2010, he signed a three-year contract extension that will keep him in Vitoria-Gasteiz through 2015.

=== Anadolu Efes ===
On 6 July 2011 he signed a three-year contract with Anadolu Efes of the Turkish Basketball League.

=== Cedevita Zagreb ===
On 5 January 2015 he signed a contract with the Croatian club Cedevita for the rest of the season. With Cedevita, he won the Croatian League and Cup.

=== EA7 Emporio Armani Milano ===
On 28 August 2015 he signed with EA7 Emporio Armani Milano of the Italian Lega Basket Serie A.

== Croatian national team ==
He also plays for the Croatian national team.
