= Croatian Basketball All-Star Game =

- Status: Inactive
- Inaugurated: 1993-94
- Most recent: 2014-15
- Organizer: Croatian Basketball Federation; HT Premijer liga

The Croatian Basketball All-Star Game is an annual basketball event in Croatia, organised by the Croatian Basketball Federation and it was established in 1993, nearly two years after Croatia gained its independence and organised its first championship. The only All-Star Game experience the Croatian fans had enjoyed prior to the first edition of the 1993–94 season was the 1991 Yugoslav All-Star Game which was the only ever to take place in former Yugoslavia.

== List of games ==
Bold: Team that won the game.

Season	Date / Location	Team	Score	Team	MVP
1993-94		**North**	**103**-100	South	(Croatia) Josip Vrankovic
1994-95		**North**	**139**-134	South	(Croatia) Zdravko Radulovic
1995-96		**North**	**107**-105	South	(Croatia) Ivica Žurić
1996-97	Slavonski Brod	North	88-**91**	**South**	(United States) Gerald Lewis
1997-98		Croatian All Stars	141-**149**	**Foreign All Stars**	(Croatia) Gordan Giricek
1998-99	Karlovac	**Croatian All Stars**	**154**-124	Foreign All Stars	(Croatia) Emilio Kovačić
1999-00	4 January 2000, Cakovec	**Croatian All Stars**	**129**-90	1.A League All Stars	(Croatia) Josip Sesar
2000-01	28 December 2000, Cakovec	**North**	**118**-108	South	(Croatia) Josip Sesar (2)
2001-02	23 December 2001, Osijek	North	107-**120**	**South**	(Croatia) Tomislav Ruzic
2002-03		North	n/a	South	
2003-04		**North**	(defeated)	South	
2004-05	19 December 2004, Crikvenica	**North**	(defeated)	South	
2005-06		**North**	(defeated)	South	
2006-07	(hosted in Belisce)	North	(defeated by)	**South**	(Croatia) Josip Sesar
2007-08	19 December 2004	**North**	**125**-117	South	(Croatia) Pankracije Barać
2009-10	19 February 2010	North	n/a	South	
2011-12	17 February 2012, Krizevci	Croatian All Stars	138-**150**	**Foreign All Stars**	(United States) Josh Heytvelt
2014-15	24 February 2015, Rijeka	**North**	**136**-122	South	(Croatia) Lovro Mazalin

== Three-Point Shoot Contest ==
Year	Player	Team
1993-94	(Croatia) Davor Marcelic	Cibona Zagreb
1994-95	(Croatia) Vladimir Jaksic	Cibona Zagreb
1995-96	(Croatia) Miro Jurić	KK Rijeka
1996-97	(Croatia) Ivica Marić	KK Zrinjevac Zagreb
1997-98	(Croatia) Gordan Giricek	Cibona Zagreb
1998-99	(Croatia) Vladimir Krstić	Cibona Zagreb
1999-00	(Croatia) Gordan Giricek	Cibona Zagreb
2000-01	(Croatia) Ivica Marić	KK Zadar
2001-02	(Croatia) Damir Voloder	Osijek
2006-07	(Bosnia and Herzegovina) (Croatia) Krunoslav Rimac	Svjetlost
2011-12	(Croatia) Marko Car	Cedevita Zagreb
2014-15	(Croatia) Fran Pilepić	Cedevita Zagreb

== Slam-Dunk winners ==
Year	Player	Team
1993-94	(Croatia) Davor Marcelic	Cibona
1994-95	(Croatia) Davor Marcelic	Cibona
1995-96	(Croatia) Jere Macura	
1996-97	(Croatia) Jere Macura	
1997-98	(United States) Darren Henrie	KK Split
1998-99	(Croatia) Davor Marcelic	Cibona
1999-00	(Croatia) Davor Marcelic	Cibona Zagreb
2000-01	(Croatia) Marijan Mance	KK Rijeka
2001-02	(United States) Vincent Thomas	Osijek
2006-07	(Croatia) Pankracije Barac	KK Zadar
2011-12	(United States) Antwain Barbour	Cibona
2014-15	(Croatia) Dino Chinac	KK Kvarner 2010

== Players with most appearances ==
Player	All-Star	Editions	Notes
(Croatia) Josip Sesar	4	2000, 2001, 2002, 2007	2x MVP
(Croatia) Davor Marcelić	4	1994, 1995, 1998 and 2000	
(Croatia) Lukša Andrić	4	2005, 2006, 2007 and 2008	
(Croatia) Marko Car	3	2007, 2010 and 2012	
(Croatia) Damjan Rudež	3	2007, 2008 and 2010	
(Croatia) Gordan Giricek	3	1998, 2000 and 2001	1x MVP
(Croatia) Jakov Vladović	3	2005, 2006 and 2008	
(Croatia) Marin Rozić	3	2007, 2008 and 2010	
(Croatia) Krunoslav Simon	3	2006, 2008 and 2010	
(Croatia) Andrija Zizic	3	2000, 2001, 2003	
(Croatia) Marino Bazdaric	3	2001, 2002, 2005	
(Croatia) Davor Kus	3	2000, 2002, 2007	
(Croatia) Sandro Nicevic	2	1996, 2000	
(Croatia) Marko Banic	2	2004, 2005	
(Croatia) Marko Tomas	2	2005, 2010	
(Croatia) Ivan Tomas	2	2002, 2005	
(Croatia) Luka Zoric	2	2007, 2010	
(Bosnia and Herzegovina) Miralem Halilović	2	2012 and 2014	
(Croatia) Vladimir Krstić	2	1999 and 2000	
(Croatia) Josip Vrankovic	2	1994, 2000	1x MVP
(Croatia) Nikola Prkačin	2	2000, 2001	
(Croatia) Nikola Vujčić	2	1999, 2000	
(Croatia) Tomislav Ružić	2	2000 and 2002	1x MVP
(United States) Juby Johnson	2	2006, 2008	
(Croatia) Roko Ukic	2	2002, 2005	
(Croatia) Franko Kaštropil	2	2005, 2006	
(Croatia) Goran Vrbanc	2	2005, 2006	
(Croatia) Rok Stipčević	2	2007, 2010	
(Croatia) Jure Lalic	2	2007, 2008	
(Croatia) Miro Bilan	2	2010, 2012	
(Croatia) Damir Miljkovic	2	2002, 2005	

== Distinctions ==
=== EuroLeague Hall of Fame ===
- (Croatia) Nikola Vujčić

== See also ==
- Adriatic Basketball Association All-Star Game
