= EuroLeague MVP of the Round =

European basketball award

The EuroLeague MVP (Most Valuable Player) of the Round, previously known as the EuroLeague MVP of the Week, is an award of Europe's premier level basketball league, the EuroLeague, that is given to the best player of each round of the season. Each game on the EuroLeague's season schedule is considered to be an individual round. In order to win the award, a player must have the highest PIR stat among all players of the round's winning teams. Only one game is taken into account in determining the award, as each individual game on the schedule is counted as one round.

The award began with the EuroLeague 2000–01 season.

== Criteria ==
The award is not voted on by anyone. It is determined by a statistical formula, called either the Performance Index Rating, or the Performance Index Ranking (PIR) by the EuroLeague, and also known as either Evaluation or Valuation, in some European national domestic basketball leagues.

The Performance Index Rating also includes the Blocked Shots Against stat (the number of field goal attempts that a player has blocked). The stat's formula is (Points + Rebounds + Assists + Steals + Blocks + Fouls Drawn) - (Missed Field Goals + Missed Free Throws + Turnovers + Shots Rejected + Fouls Committed). The Performance Index Rating stat is not commonly used by the NBA or FIBA. The Performance Index Rating (PIR), is not the same stat as the NBA Player Efficiency (EFF), or the John Hollinger Player Efficiency Rating (PER) or Game Score stats, although it is often mistaken to be.

Prior to the EuroLeague 2011–12 season, the award was given to the player that had the round's highest PIR score. However, starting with the EuroLeague 2011–12 season, the award's criteria were changed; with the award to go to the player from a winning team, who had the round's highest PIR score. So, a player could have the league's highest PIR score for that round, but not win the round's MVP award, if his team lost their game that.

== 2000–01 ==
Regular Season

Week	Player	Team	PIR
1	(Greece) Panagiotis Liadelis	(Greece) PAOK	42
2	(Serbia and Montenegro) Dejan Tomašević	(Serbia and Montenegro) Budućnost	34
2	(Italy) Gianluca Basile	(Italy) Paf Wennington Bologna	34
3	(Serbia and Montenegro) Milenko Topić	(Serbia and Montenegro) Budućnost	39
4	(Serbia and Montenegro) Dejan Tomašević (2)	(Serbia and Montenegro) Budućnost	42
5	(United States) Derrick Hamilton	(Russia) St. Petersburg Lions	38
6	(Croatia) Darko Krunić	(Croatia) Zadar	39
7	(Italy) Gregor Fučka	(Italy) Paf Wennington Bologna	42
8	(United States) Kebu Stewart	(Israel) Hapoel Jerusalem	47
9	(United States) Derrick Hamilton (2)	(Russia) St. Petersburg Lions	40
10	(Argentina) Marcelo Nicola	(Italy) Benetton Treviso	36

Playoffs

Game	Player	Team	PIR
8thF G1	(United States) Alphonso Ford	(Greece) Peristeri	45
8thF G2	(Serbia and Montenegro) Dejan Tomašević (3)	(Serbia and Montenegro) Budućnost	34
8thF G2	(Croatia) Dino Rađja	(Greece) Olympiacos	34
8thF G2	(Italy) Riccardo Pittis	(Italy) Benetton Treviso	34
8thF G3	(Greece) Angelos Koronios	(Greece) PAOK	20
8thF G3	(Croatia) Emilio Kovačić	(Slovenia) Union Olimpija	20
4F G1	(Italy) Gregor Fučka (2)	(Italy) Paf Wennington Bologna	43
4F G2	(United States) Rashard Griffith	(Italy) Kinder Bologna	32
4F G3	(Italy) Carlton Myers	(Italy) Paf Wennington Bologna	45
SF G1	(Lithuania) Saulius Štombergas	(Spain) TAU Cerámica	43
SF G2	(United States) Elmer Bennett	(Spain) TAU Cerámica	33
SF G3	(Argentina) Fabricio Oberto	(Spain) TAU Cerámica	25

== 2001–02 ==
Regular Season

Week	Player	Team	PIR
1	(Turkey) Asım Pars	(Turkey) Ülker	39
2	(Slovenia) Jaka Lakovič	(Slovenia) KK Krka	55
3	(Italy) Gregor Fučka	(Italy) Skipper Bologna	37
4	(Italy) Gregor Fučka (2)	(Italy) Skipper Bologna	45
5	(Serbia and Montenegro) Sasha Đjorđjević	(Spain) Real Madrid	36
5	(Turkey) Mirsad Türkcan	(Russia) CSKA Moscow	36
6	(Russia) Valeri Daineko	(Russia) Ural Great	40
7	(Greece) Dimos Dikoudis	(Greece) AEK	42
8	(Lithuania) Andrius Giedraitis	(Belgium) Telindus Oostende	43
9	(Russia) Ruslan Avleev	(Russia) Ural Great	47
10	(Turkey) Mirsad Türkcan (2)	(Russia) CSKA Moscow	43
11	(Croatia) Nikola Prkačin	(Croatia) Cibona	41
12	(Turkey) Mirsad Türkcan (3)	(Russia) CSKA Moscow	34
12	(Belgium) Ron Ellis	(Belgium) Spirou Charleroi	34
13	(Ukraine) Grigorij Khizhnyak	(Lithuania) Žalgiris	36
13	(Slovenia) Beno Udrih	(Slovenia) Union Olimpija	36
13	(France) Yann Bonato	(France) ASVEL	36
14	(Ukraine) Grigorij Khizhnyak (2)	(Lithuania) Žalgiris	36

Top 16

Week	Player	Team	PIR
1	(Russia) Ruslan Avleev (2)	(Russia) Ural Great	42
2	(United States) Alphonso Ford	(Greece) Olympiacos	29
3	(Turkey) Memo Okur	(Turkey) Efes Pilsen	36
4	(Slovenia) Matjaž Smodiš	(Italy) Kinder Bologna	38
5	(United States) Marcus Brown	(Turkey) Efes Pilsen	41
6	(Turkey) Mirsad Türkcan (4)	(Russia) CSKA Moscow	34

== 2002–03 ==
Regular Season

Week	Player	Team	PIR
1	(Finland) Hanno Möttölä	(Spain) TAU Cerámica	40
2	(Croatia) Mate Skelin	(Italy) Skipper Bologna	35
3	(Serbia and Montenegro) Miloš Vujanić	(Serbia and Montenegro) Partizan	35
4	(Turkey) Mirsad Türkcan	(Italy) Montepaschi Siena	43
5	(United States) DeMarco Johnson	(Greece) Olympiacos	35
6	(Spain) Jorge Garbajosa	(Italy) Benetton Treviso	39
7	(Germany) Ademola Okulaja	(Spain) Unicaja Málaga	36
8	(Turkey) Mirsad Türkcan (2)	(Italy) Montepaschi Siena	32
8	(United States) Alphonso Ford	(Italy) Montepaschi Siena	32
9	(Argentina) Andrés Nocioni	(Spain) TAU Cerámica	36
10	(Turkey) Mirsad Türkcan (3)	(Italy) Montepaschi Siena	38
11	(Argentina) Andrés Nocioni (2)	(Spain) TAU Cerámica	37
12	(United States) Tanoka Beard	(Lithuania) Žalgiris	39
13	(Latvia) Kaspars Kambala	(Turkey) Efes Pilsen	33
14	(Turkey) Mirsad Türkcan (4)	(Italy) Montepaschi Siena	40

Top 16

Week	Player	Team	PIR
1	(Turkey) Mirsad Türkcan (5)	(Italy) Montepaschi Siena	35
2	(Greece) Antonis Fotsis	(Greece) Panathinaikos	31
3	(United States) Marcus Brown	(Turkey) Efes Pilsen	36
4	(Croatia) Slaven Rimac	(Turkey) Ülker	38
5	(Georgia (country)) Zaza Pachulia	(Turkey) Ülker	36
6	(Turkey) Mirsad Türkcan (6)	(Italy) Montepaschi Siena	36

== 2003–04 ==
Regular Season

Week	Player	Team	PIR
1	(United States) Lynn Greer	(Poland) Śląsk Wrocław	44
2	(Argentina) Andrés Nocioni	(Spain) TAU Cerámica	48
3	(United States) Maceo Baston	(Israel) Maccabi Tel Aviv	35
4	(United States) Maceo Baston (2)	(Israel) Maccabi Tel Aviv	42
5	(United States) Scoonie Penn	(Croatia) Cibona	37
6	(United States) Marcus Brown	(Russia) CSKA Moscow	35
7	(Lithuania) Arvydas Macijauskas	(Spain) TAU Cerámica	50
8	(United States) Lynn Greer (2)	(Poland) Śląsk Wrocław	32
9	(United States) Lynn Greer (3)	(Poland) Śląsk Wrocław	38
9	(Italy) Gregor Fučka	(Spain) FC Barcelona	38
9	(Greece) Panagiotis Liadelis	(Greece) Olympiacos	38
10	(United States) Tanoka Beard	(Lithuania) Žalgiris	63
11	(Italy) Roberto Chiacig	(Italy) Montepaschi Siena	35
12	(United States) Tyus Edney	(Italy) Benetton Treviso	34
13	(United States) Horace Jenkins	(Greece) AEK	35
14	(Lithuania) Šarūnas Jasikevičius	(Israel) Maccabi Tel Aviv	32

Top 16

Week	Player	Team	PIR
1	(Lithuania) Arvydas Sabonis	(Lithuania) Žalgiris	47
2	(Turkey) İbrahim Kutluay	(Turkey) Ülker	33
2	(France) Florent Piétrus	(France) Pau-Orthez	33
3	(Croatia) Dženan Rahimić	(Slovenia) Union Olimpija	35
4	(Slovenia) Jaka Lakovič	(Greece) Panathinaikos	51
5	(Argentina) Andrés Nocioni (2)	(Spain) TAU Cerámica	37
6	(Lithuania) Šarūnas Jasikevičius (2)	(Israel) Maccabi Tel Aviv	37

== 2004–05 ==
Regular Season

Week	Player	Team	PIR
1	(Lithuania) Saulius Štombergas	(Turkey) Ülker	32
1	(Israel) Yaniv Green	(Israel) Maccabi Tel Aviv	32
2	(United States) Tanoka Beard	(Lithuania) Žalgiris	30
3	(United States) Anthony Parker	(Israel) Maccabi Tel Aviv	47
4	(Croatia) Marko Popović	(Croatia) Cibona	54
5	(Serbia and Montenegro) Dejan Milojević	(Serbia and Montenegro) Partizan	55
6	(United States) Charles Smith	(Italy) Scavolini Pesaro	41
7	(United States) Chris Williams	(Germany) Frankfurt Skyliners	39
8	(United States) Anthony Parker (2)	(Israel) Maccabi Tel Aviv	35
9	(Spain) Jorge Garbajosa	(Spain) Unicaja Málaga	42
10	(United States) Anthony Parker (3)	(Israel) Maccabi Tel Aviv	36
11	(United States) Charles Smith (2)	(Italy) Scavolini Pesaro	39
12	(United States) Anthony Parker (4)	(Israel) Maccabi Tel Aviv	37
13	(United States) Tanoka Beard (2)	(Lithuania) Žalgiris	32
14	(Australia) David Andersen	(Russia) CSKA Moscow	45

Top 16

Week	Player	Team	PIR
1	(Australia) David Andersen (2)	(Russia) CSKA Moscow	41
2	(United States) Anthony Parker (5)	(Israel) Maccabi Tel Aviv	40
3	(Australia) David Andersen (3)	(Russia) CSKA Moscow	37
4	(Finland) Hanno Möttölä	(Italy) Scavolini Pesaro	30
5	(Turkey) Serkan Erdoğan	(Turkey) Ülker	32
6	(Slovenia) Jaka Lakovič	(Greece) Panathinaikos	30

Playoffs

Game	Player	Team	PIR
4F G1	(Argentina) Luis Scola	(Spain) TAU Cerámica	43
4F G2	(United States) Will Solomon	(Turkey) Efes Pilsen	34
4F G3	(Bosnia and Herzegovina) Henry Domercant	(Turkey) Efes Pilsen	18

== 2005–06 ==
Regular Season

Week	Player	Team	PIR
1	(Croatia) Nikola Vujčić	(Israel) Maccabi Tel Aviv	33
1	(Serbia and Montenegro) Dejan Milojević	(Serbia and Montenegro) Partizan	33
2	(Greece) Vassilis Spanoulis	(Greece) Panathinaikos	32
3	(Croatia) Marko Popović	(Turkey) Efes Pilsen	31
4	(United States) Maceo Baston	(Israel) Maccabi Tel Aviv	35
5	(Serbia and Montenegro) Dejan Milojević (2)	(Serbia and Montenegro) Partizan	33
5	(Dominican Republic) Ricardo Greer	(France) Strasbourg	33
6	(United States) Anthony Parker	(Israel) Maccabi Tel Aviv	36
6	(Bosnia and Herzegovina) Haris Mujezinović	(Lithuania) Lietuvos Rytas	36
7	(United States) Scoonie Penn	(Croatia) Cibona	36
8	(Azerbaijan) Spencer Nelson	(Germany) Brose Bamberg	48
9	(Croatia) Andrija Žižić	(Greece) Olympiacos	41
10	(United States) Mike Batiste	(Greece) Panathinaikos	33
11	(United States) Louis Bullock	(Spain) Real Madrid	34
12	(Croatia) Marko Popović (2)	(Turkey) Efes Pilsen	40
13	(United States) Tyus Edney	(Greece) Olympiacos	38
13	(Spain) Felipe Reyes	(Spain) Real Madrid	38
14	(United States) Scoonie Penn (2)	(Croatia) Cibona	37

Top 16

Week	Player	Team	PIR
1	(United States) Anthony Parker (2)	(Israel) Maccabi Tel Aviv	39
2	(Greece) Sofoklis Schortsanitis	(Greece) Olympiacos	32
2	(Serbia and Montenegro) Igor Rakočević	(Spain) Real Madrid	32
3	(Spain) Jorge Garbajosa	(Spain) Unicaja Málaga	37
4	(United States) Maceo Baston (2)	(Israel) Maccabi Tel Aviv	28
4	(United States) Antonio Granger	(Turkey) Efes Pilsen	28
4	(Croatia) Nikola Prkačin	(Turkey) Efes Pilsen	28
5	(Serbia and Montenegro) Igor Rakočević (2)	(Spain) Real Madrid	28
6	(United States) Maceo Baston (3)	(Israel) Maccabi Tel Aviv	29
6	(Bosnia and Herzegovina) Henry Domercant	(Turkey) Efes Pilsen	29

Playoffs

Game	Player	Team	PIR
4F G1; 4F G2	(Greece) Vassilis Spanoulis (2)	(Greece) Panathinaikos	23
4F G3	(Greece) Michalis Kakiouzis	(Spain) FC Barcelona	23

== 2006–07 ==
Regular Season

Week	Player	Team	PIR
1	(Spain) Carlos Cabezas	(Spain) Unicaja	41
2	(United States) Eric Campbell	(France) Le Mans	32
3	(Spain) Juan Carlos Navarro	(Spain) Barcelona	35
4	(United States) Ronnie Burrell	(Germany) RheinEnergie	36
5	(Finland) Teemu Rannikko	(Slovenia) Union Olimpija	33
6	(Croatia) Nikola Vujčić	(Israel) Maccabi Tel Aviv	46
7	(United States) Brent Wright	(Croatia) Cibona	35
8	(Greece) Lazaros Papadopoulos	(Russia) Dynamo Moscow	38
9	(United States) Marcus Haislip	(Turkey) Efes Pilsen	41
10	(Croatia) Nikola Vujčić (2)	(Israel) Maccabi Tel Aviv	40
11	(United States) Tanoka Beard	(Lithuania) Žalgiris	31
12	(Croatia) Nikola Vujčić (3)	(Israel) Maccabi Tel Aviv	34
12	(United States) James Thomas	(Italy) Climamio Bologna	34
13	(United States) Terrell Lyday	(Italy) Benetton	40
14	(Bulgaria) Vasco Evtimov	(Italy) Climamio Bologna	38

Top 16

Week	Player	Team	PIR
1	(United States) Scoonie Penn	(Greece) Olympiacos	35
1	(United States) Marcus Goree	(Italy) Benetton	35
2	(United States) Jamie Arnold	(Israel) Maccabi Tel Aviv	29
3	(Greece) Savvas Iliadis	(Greece) Aris	30
4	(Greece) Antonis Fotsis	(Russia) Dynamo Moscow	38
5	(United States) Michael Wright	(France) Pau Orthez	31
6	(Greece) Antonis Fotsis (2)	(Russia) Dynamo Moscow	39

Playoffs

Game	Player	Team	PIR
4F G1; 4F G2	(Spain) Juan Carlos Navarro (2)	(Spain) Barcelona	23
4F G3	(Greece) Theo Papaloukas	(Russia) CSKA Moscow	27

== 2007–08 ==
Regular Season

Week	Player	Team	PIR
1	(Montenegro) Nikola Peković	(Serbia) Partizan	40
2	(Slovenia) Erazem Lorbek	(Italy) Lottomatica Roma	29
2	(Lithuania) Artūras Jomantas	(Lithuania) Lietuvos rytas	29
3	(North Macedonia) Jeremiah Massey	(Greece) Aris	40
4	(Belgium) Tomas Van Den Spiegel	(Poland) Prokom Trefl Sopot	50
5	(Lithuania) Arvydas Macijauskas	(Greece) Olympiacos	41
6	(United States) Dewarick Spencer	(Italy) Virtus Bologna	44
7	(Puerto Rico) Daniel Santiago	(Spain) Unicaja	34
8	(United States) Marc Salyers	(France) Chorale Roanne	34
9	(Brazil) Tiago Splitter	(Spain) TAU Ceramica	42
10	(United States) Scoonie Penn	(Turkey) Efes Pilsen	38
11	(United States) Loren Woods	(Turkey) Efes Pilsen	35
12	(United States) Will Solomon	(Turkey) Fenerbahçe	33
12	(Central African Republic) Romain Sato	(Italy) Montepaschi Siena	33
12	(Slovenia) Marko Milič	(Slovenia) Union Olimpija	33
13	(Serbia) Novica Veličković	(Serbia) Partizan	30
14	(Spain) Jordi Trias	(Spain) Barcelona	36

Top 16

Week	Player	Team	PIR
1	(United States) Lynn Greer	(Greece) Olympiacos	31
2	(Uruguay) Esteban Batista	(Israel) Maccabi Tel Aviv	27
3	(Greece) Dimitris Diamantidis	(Greece) Panathinaikos	29
3	(United States) Terence Morris	(Israel) Maccabi Tel Aviv	29
4	(United States) Lynn Greer (2)	(Greece) Olympiacos	37
5	(United States) Scoonie Penn (2)	(Turkey) Efes Pilsen	32
5	(Belgium) Axel Hervelle	(Spain) Real Madrid	32
6	(United States) Will Solomon (2)	(Turkey) Fenerbahçe	34
6	(North Macedonia) Jeremiah Massey (2)	(Greece) Aris	34

Playoffs

Game	Player	Team	PIR
4F G1; 4F G2	(Italy) Gianluca Basile	(Spain) Barcelona	22
4F G1; 4F G2	(Slovenia) Matjaž Smodiš	(Russia) CSKA Moscow	22
4F G3	(Brazil) Tiago Splitter (2)	(Spain) TAU Ceramica	27

== 2008–09 ==
Regular Season

Game	Player	Team	Rating
1	(United States) Will McDonald	(Spain) Tau Cerámica	32
2	(United Kingdom) Pops Mensah-Bonsu	(Spain) Joventut Badalona	37
3	(Serbia) Igor Rakočević	(Spain) Tau Cerámica	34
4	(United States) Mike Hall	(Italy) Armani Jeans Milano	28
5	(Spain) Edu Hernandez-Sonseca	(Spain) Joventut Badalona	38
6	(Israel) Lior Eliyahu	(Israel) Maccabi Tel Aviv	42
7	(Guyana) Rawle Marshall	(Croatia) Cibona	34
8	(Slovenia) Sani Bečirović	(Italy) Lottomatica Roma	38
9	(United States) Immanuel McElroy	(Germany) Alba Berlin	38
10	(Turkey) Oğuz Savaş	(Turkey) Fenerbahçe Ülker	41

Top 16

Game	Player	Team	PIR
1	(Montenegro) Nikola Peković	(Greece) Panathinaikos	28
1	(Israel) D'or Fischer	(Israel) Maccabi Tel Aviv	28
1	(Israel) Lior Eliyahu (2)	(Israel) Maccabi Tel Aviv	28
2	(Serbia) Novica Veličković	(Serbia) Partizan	29
3	(Turkey) Ersan İlyasova	(Spain) FC Barcelona	39
4	(Brazil) Tiago Splitter	(Spain) Tau Cerámica	28
5	(United States) Charles Gaines	(Israel) Maccabi Tel Aviv	33
5	(United States) Mike Hall (2)	(Italy) Armani Jeans Milano	33
6	(United States) Mike Batiste	(Greece) Panathinaikos	35

Playoffs

Game	Player	Team	PIR
1	(Central African Republic) Romain Sato	(Italy) Montepaschi Siena	36
2	(Slovenia) Erazem Lorbek	(Russia) CSKA Moscow	33
3	(Lithuania) Ramūnas Šiškauskas	(Russia) CSKA Moscow	30
3	(Slovenia) Matjaž Smodiš	(Russia) CSKA Moscow	30
4	(United States) Terrell McIntyre	(Italy) Montepaschi Siena	37
5	(Turkey) Ersan İlyasova (2)	(Spain) FC Barcelona	26

== 2009–10 ==
Regular Season

Game	Player	Team	Rating
1	(Lithuania) Darjuš Lavrinovič	(Spain) Real Madrid	49
2	(Brazil) Tiago Splitter	(Spain) Caja Laboral	36
2	(United States) Matt Walsh	(Slovenia) Union Olimpija	36
3	(Central African Republic) Romain Sato	(Italy) Montepaschi Siena	37
4	(Greece) Ioannis Bourousis	(Greece) Olympiacos	32
5	(United States) Keith Langford	(Russia) Khimki	38
5	(Australia) Aleks Marić	(Serbia) Partizan	38
6	(Lithuania) Dainius Šalenga	(Lithuania) Žalgiris	28
7	(Australia) Aleks Marić (2)	(Serbia) Partizan	49
8	(Australia) Aleks Marić (3)	(Serbia) Partizan	29
9	(Serbia) Miloš Teodosić	(Greece) Olympiacos	34
9	(United States) Chuck Eidson	(Israel) Maccabi Tel Aviv	34
10	(Spain) Ricky Rubio	(Spain) Regal FC Barcelona	33
10	(Lithuania) Ramūnas Šiškauskas	(Russia) CSKA Moscow	33

Top 16

Game	Player	Team	PIR
1	(Lithuania) Ramūnas Šiškauskas (2)	(Russia) CSKA Moscow	29
1	(Lithuania) Robertas Javtokas	(Russia) Khimki	29
1	(Spain) Fernando San Emeterio	(Spain) Caja Laboral	29
2	(United States) Alan Anderson	(Israel) Maccabi Tel Aviv	40
3	(United States) Terrell McIntyre	(Italy) Montepaschi Siena	43
4	(United States) Jamont Gordon	(Croatia) Cibona	40
5	(Croatia) Bojan Bogdanović	(Croatia) Cibona	28
6	(Central African Republic) Romain Sato (2)	(Italy) Montepaschi Siena	27

Playoffs

Game	Player	Team	PIR
1	(Serbia) Dušan Kecman	(Serbia) Partizan	30
2	(Lithuania) Linas Kleiza	(Greece) Olympiacos	35
3	(Spain) Juan Carlos Navarro	(Spain) Regal FC Barcelona	29
4	(Spain) Fernando San Emeterio (2)	(Spain) Caja Laboral	30

== 2010–11 ==
Regular Season

Game	Player	Team	Rating
1	(United States) Chuck Eidson	(Israel) Maccabi Tel Aviv	30
2	(United States) Bootsy Thornton	(Turkey) Efes Pilsen	29
3	(Greece) Dimitris Diamantidis	(Greece) Panathinaikos	31
4	(Spain) Berni Rodríguez	(Spain) Unicaja Málaga	36
5	(Dominican Republic) Sammy Mejia	(France) Cholet	35
6	(Lithuania) Kšyštof Lavrinovič	(Italy) Montepaschi Siena	36
7	(North Macedonia) Darius Washington	(Italy) Lottomatica Roma	31
8	(Bosnia and Herzegovina) Ratko Varda	(Poland) Asseco Prokom	31
9	(North Macedonia) Bo McCalebb	(Italy) Montepaschi Siena	34
10	(United States) Keith Langford	(Russia) Khimki	42

Top 16

Game	Player	Team	Rating
1	(United States) Kenny Gregory	(Slovenia) Union Olimpija	30
2	(Brazil) Marcelinho Huertas	(Spain) Caja Laboral	29
2	(United States) Khalid El-Amin	(Lithuania) Lietuvos Rytas	29
3	(Israel) D'or Fischer	(Spain) Real Madrid	30
3	(Israel) Lior Eliyahu	(Israel) Maccabi Tel Aviv	30
4	(Greece) Antonis Fotsis	(Greece) Panathinaikos	40
5	(Brazil) Marcelinho Huertas (2)	(Spain) Caja Laboral	30
6	(Spain) Fernando San Emeterio	(Spain) Caja Laboral	37

Playoffs

Game	Player	Team	Rating
1	(North Macedonia) Richard Hendrix	(Israel) Maccabi Tel Aviv	28
2	(United States) Malik Hairston	(Italy) Montepaschi Siena	32
3	(Serbia) Marko Jarić	(Italy) Montepaschi Siena	27
3	(Israel) D'or Fischer (2)	(Spain) Real Madrid	27
4	(United States) Malik Hairston (2)	(Italy) Montepaschi Siena	31
5	(Serbia) Duško Savanović	(Spain) Power Electronics Valencia	23

== 2011–12 ==
Regular Season

Game	Player	Team	PIR
1	(Russia) Andrei Kirilenko	(Russia) CSKA Moscow	37
2	(France) Nicolas Batum	(France) Nancy	36
3	(United States) Jordan Farmar	(Israel) Maccabi Tel Aviv	35
4	(France) Nicolas Batum (2)	(France) Nancy	35
5	(Russia) Andrei Kirilenko (2)	(Russia) CSKA Moscow	39
6	(Spain) Fernando San Emeterio	(Spain) Caja Laboral	36
7	(Slovenia) Erazem Lorbek	(Spain) FC Barcelona	25
7	(Serbia) Milan Mačvan	(Serbia) Partizan	25
8	(Spain) Nikola Mirotić	(Spain) Real Madrid	33
9	(Serbia) Nenad Krstić	(Russia) CSKA Moscow	31
10	(Italy) Pietro Aradori	(Italy) Montepaschi Siena	33

Top 16

Game	Player	Team	PIR
1	(Belarus) Vladimir Veremeenko	(Russia) UNICS	32
2	(North Macedonia) Bo McCalebb	(Italy) Montepaschi Siena	36
3	(Serbia) Nenad Krstić (2)	(Russia) CSKA Moscow	31
4	(United States) Aaron Jackson	(Spain) Gescrap Bizkaia	28
5	(Montenegro) Omar Cook	(Italy) EA7 Milano	22
6	(Georgia (country)) Manuchar Markoishvili	(Italy) Bennet Cantù	35

Playoffs

Game	Player	Team	PIR
1	(Greece) Dimitris Diamantidis	(Greece) Panathinaikos	31
2	(Russia) Andrei Kirilenko (3)	(Russia) CSKA Moscow	31
3	(Greece) Kostas Vasileiadis	(Spain) Gescrap Bizkaia	21
4	(Russia) Andrei Kirilenko (4)	(Russia) CSKA Moscow	29
5	(Greece) Dimitris Diamantidis (2)	(Greece) Panathinaikos	34

== 2012–13 ==
Regular Season

Game	Player	Team	PIR
1	(Turkey) Emir Preldžić	(Turkey) Fenerbahçe Ülker	31
2	(United States) Sonny Weems	(Russia) CSKA Moscow	38
3	(Spain) Rudy Fernández	(Spain) Real Madrid	30
3	(Spain) Fernando San Emeterio	(Spain) Caja Laboral	30
4	(United States) Bobby Brown	(Italy) Montepaschi Siena	43
5	(United States) Bobby Brown (2)	(Italy) Montepaschi Siena	31
6	(Slovenia) Sasha Vujačić	(Turkey) Anadolu Efes	31
7	(Spain) Rudy Fernández (2)	(Spain) Real Madrid	28
7	(Croatia) Ante Tomić	(Spain) FC Barcelona Regal	28
8	(Serbia) Miloš Teodosić	(Russia) CSKA Moscow	25
9	(United States) Blake Schilb	(France) Élan Chalon	38
10	(United States) Shawn James	(Israel) Maccabi Tel Aviv	27
10	(Serbia) Nemanja Bjelica	(Spain) Caja Laboral	27

Top 16

Game	Player	Team	PIR
1	(Croatia) Ante Tomić (2)	(Spain) FC Barcelona	27
2	(United States) Bobby Brown (3)	(Italy) Montepaschi Siena	50
3	(Georgia (country)) Ricky Hickman	(Israel) Maccabi Tel Aviv	34
4	(United States) Paul Davis	(Russia) Khimki	29
5	(Croatia) Bojan Bogdanović	(Turkey) Fenerbahçe Ülker	27
5	(United States) Marcus Williams	(Spain) Unicaja	27
6	(Spain) Rudy Fernández (3)	(Spain) Real Madrid	34
7	(Russia) Sasha Kaun	(Russia) CSKA Moscow	30
8	(United States) Devin Smith	(Israel) Maccabi Tel Aviv	28
8	(Croatia) Luka Žorić	(Spain) Unicaja	28
8	(Croatia) Roko Ukić	(Greece) Panathinaikos	28
9	(Serbia) Nenad Krstić	(Russia) CSKA Moscow	26
10	(Spain) Nikola Mirotić	(Spain) Real Madrid	37
11	(Croatia) Luka Žorić (2)	(Spain) Unicaja	33
12	(Finland) Petteri Koponen	(Russia) Khimki	35
13	(Australia) Nathan Jawai	(Spain) FC Barcelona	34
14	(Greece) Kostas Papanikolaou	(Greece) Olympiacos	37

Playoffs

Game	Player	Team	PIR
1	(Spain) Rudy Fernández (4)	(Spain) Real Madrid	22
2	(Russia) Victor Khryapa	(Russia) CSKA Moscow	25
3	(United States) Jamon Gordon	(Turkey) Anadolu Efes	24
4	(Russia) Victor Khryapa (2)	(Russia) CSKA Moscow	29
5	(Australia) Nathan Jawai (2)	(Spain) FC Barcelona	21

== 2013–14 ==
Regular Season

Game	Player	Team	PIR
1	(Spain) Nikola Mirotić	(Spain) Real Madrid	27
2	(Azerbaijan) Nik Caner-Medley	(Spain) Unicaja	29
3	(United States) Bryant Dunston	(Greece) Olympiacos	33
4	(United States) DeMarcus Nelson	(Serbia) Crvena Zvezda	31
5	(United States) Justin Dentmon	(Lithuania) Žalgiris	32
6	(Montenegro) Vladimir Dragičević	(Poland) Stelmet Zielona Góra	32
7	(Slovenia) Boštjan Nachbar	(Spain) FC Barcelona	31
8	(Greece) Vassilis Spanoulis	(Greece) Olympiacos	29
9	(Lithuania) Darjuš Lavrinovič	(Ukraine) Budivelnyk	44
10	(Serbia) Boban Marjanović	(Serbia) Crvena Zvezda	33

Top 16

Game	Player	Team	PIR
1	(Greece) Vassilis Spanoulis (2)	(Greece) Olympiacos	39
2	(Brazil) Marcelinho Huertas	(Spain) FC Barcelona	30
3	(Spain) Rudy Fernández	(Spain) Real Madrid	30
4	(Croatia) Krunoslav Simon	(Russia) Lokomotiv Kuban	35
5	(Serbia) Miloš Teodosić	(Russia) CSKA Moscow	31
6	(United States) Justin Dentmon (2)	(Lithuania) Žalgiris	33
7	(Croatia) Ante Tomić	(Spain) FC Barcelona	36
8	(Croatia) Ante Tomić (2)	(Spain) FC Barcelona	40
9	(Slovenia) Zoran Dragić	(Spain) Unicaja	30
10	(United States) Malcolm Delaney	(Germany) Bayern Munich	24
11	(Spain) Rudy Fernández (2)	(Spain) Real Madrid	33
12	(United States) Derrick Brown	(Russia) Lokomotiv Kuban	34
13	(Greece) Dimitris Diamantidis	(Greece) Panathinaikos	31
14	(United States) Justin Dentmon (3)	(Lithuania) Žalgiris	40

Playoffs

Game	Player	Team	PIR
1	(Georgia (country)) Ricky Hickman	(Israel) Maccabi Tel Aviv	36
2	(Greece) Ioannis Bourousis	(Spain) Real Madrid	24
2	(United States) Curtis Jerrells	(Italy) EA7 Milano	24
3	(United States) Bryant Dunston (2)	(Greece) Olympiacos	32
4	(United States) Bryant Dunston (3)	(Greece) Olympiacos	25
5	(Russia) Sasha Kaun	(Russia) CSKA Moscow	29

== 2014–15 ==
Regular Season

Game	Player	Team	PIR
1	(Serbia) Boban Marjanović	(Serbia) Crvena Zvezda	30
2	(United States) Andrew Goudelock	(Turkey) Fenerbahçe Ülker	30
3	(Azerbaijan) Jaycee Carroll	(Spain) Real Madrid	37
4	(United States) James Anderson	(Lithuania) Žalgiris	38
5	(United States) Andrew Goudelock (2)	(Turkey) Fenerbahçe Ülker	40
6	(Serbia) Zoran Erceg	(Turkey) Galatasaray	41
7	(Serbia) Boban Marjanović (2)	(Serbia) Crvena Zvezda	36
8	(Israel) D'or Fischer	(Russia) UNICS	43
9	(Serbia) Duško Savanović	(Germany) Bayern Munich	37
10	(Greece) Ioannis Bourousis	(Spain) Real Madrid	31

Top 16

Game	Player	Team	PIR
1	(Montenegro) Taylor Rochestie	(Russia) Nizhny Novgorod	32
2	(Spain) Felipe Reyes	(Spain) Real Madrid	29
2	(United States) Brian Randle	(Israel) Maccabi Tel Aviv	29
3	(France) Nando de Colo	(Russia) CSKA Moscow	34
4	(Belarus) Artsiom Parakhouski	(Russia) Nizhny Novgorod	37
5	(Croatia) Ante Tomić	(Spain) FC Barcelona	34
6	(Spain) Rudy Fernández	(Spain) Real Madrid	38
7	(France) Nando de Colo (2)	(Russia) CSKA Moscow	29
8	(Jamaica) Samardo Samuels	(Italy) EA7 Milano	47
9	(United States) Reggie Redding	(Germany) Alba Berlin	36
10	(Croatia) Ante Tomić (2)	(Spain) FC Barcelona	35
11	(Serbia) Bogdan Bogdanović	(Turkey) Fenerbahçe Ülker	32
12	(Italy) Alessandro Gentile	(Italy) EA7 Milano	30
13	(United States) Alex Renfroe	(Germany) Alba Berlin	28
14	(United States) Devin Smith	(Israel) Maccabi Tel Aviv	28
14	(Serbia) Boban Marjanović (3)	(Serbia) Crvena Zvezda	28

Playoffs

Game	Player	Team	PIR
1	(Mexico) Gustavo Ayón	(Spain) Real Madrid	29
2	(Greece) Georgios Printezis	(Greece) Olympiacos	34
3	(Greece) Nikos Pappas	(Greece) Panathinaikos	31
4	(Russia) Andrei Kirilenko	(Russia) CSKA Moscow	27

== 2015–16 ==
Regular Season

Game	Player	Team	PIR
1	(United States) Patric Young	(Greece) Olympiacos	26
2	(Greece) Ioannis Bourousis	(Spain) Laboral Kutxa	44
3	(United States) Darius Adams	(Spain) Laboral Kutxa	29
4	(Spain) Felipe Reyes	(Spain) Real Madrid	30
5	(Italy) Nicolò Melli	(Germany) Brose Baskets	37
6	(United States) Luke Harangody	(Turkey) Darüşşafaka Doğuş	35
7	(United States) Jamel McLean	(Italy) EA7 Milano	36
8	(France) Nando de Colo	(Russia) CSKA Moscow	33
8	(Germany) Maik Zirbes	(Serbia) Crvena zvezda	33
9	(Mexico) Gustavo Ayón	(Spain) Real Madrid	41
10	(France) Nobel Boungou Colo	(France) Limoges	34

Top 16

Game	Player	Team	PIR
1	(United States) Malcolm Delaney	(Russia) Lokomotiv Kuban	41
2	(United States) Malcolm Delaney (2)	(Russia) Lokomotiv Kuban	30
3	(Spain) Felipe Reyes (2)	(Spain) Real Madrid	32
4	(Greece) Ioannis Bourousis (2)	(Spain) Laboral Kutxa	30
4	(Czech Republic) Jan Veselý	(Turkey) Fenerbahçe	30
5	(Montenegro) Tyrese Rice	(Russia) Khimki	35
6	(Greece) Georgios Printezis	(Greece) Olympiacos	37
7	(Mexico) Gustavo Ayón (2)	(Spain) Real Madrid	41
8	(United States) Anthony Randolph	(Russia) Lokomotiv Kuban	43
9	(Italy) Luigi Datome	(Turkey) Fenerbahçe	29
10	(Greece) Ioannis Bourousis (3)	(Spain) Laboral Kutxa	29
11	(United States) Bradley Wanamaker	(Germany) Brose Baskets	34
12	(United States) Tyler Honeycutt	(Russia) Khimki	30
13	(Greece) Ioannis Bourousis (4)	(Spain) Laboral Kutxa	35
13	(France) Nando de Colo (2)	(Russia) CSKA Moscow	35
14	(France) Nando de Colo (3)	(Russia) CSKA Moscow	36

Playoffs

Game	Player	Team	PIR
1	(Serbia) Miloš Teodosić	(Russia) CSKA Moscow	28
2	(United States) Kyle Hines	(Russia) CSKA Moscow	25
2	(United States) Ekpe Udoh	(Turkey) Fenerbahçe	25
3	(United States) Ekpe Udoh (2)	(Turkey) Fenerbahçe	33
4	(United States) Anthony Randolph (2)	(Russia) Lokomotiv Kuban	28
5	(United States) Chris Singleton	(Russia) Lokomotiv Kuban	27

== 2016–17 ==
Regular Season

Round	Player	Team	PIR	Ref.
1	(Georgia (country)) Ricky Hickman	(Italy) EA7 Emporio Armani Milan	32	
2	(Greece) Vassilis Spanoulis	(Greece) Olympiacos	26	
3	(France) Nando de Colo	(Russia) CSKA Moscow	32	
4	(United States) Ekpe Udoh	(Turkey) Fenerbahçe	31	
5	(United States) Keith Langford	(Russia) UNICS	36	
6	(France) Nando de Colo (2)	(Russia) CSKA Moscow	35	
7	(Spain) Sergio Llull	(Spain) Real Madrid	27	
8	(Germany) Tibor Pleiß	(Turkey) Galatasaray Odeabank	28	
9	(Serbia) Miloš Teodosić	(Russia) CSKA Moscow	43	
10	(United States) Derrick Brown	(Turkey) Anadolu Efes	37	
11	(Italy) Nicolò Melli	(Germany) Brose Bamberg	40	
12	(France) Fabien Causeur	(Germany) Brose Bamberg	35	
13	(Slovenia) Luka Dončić	(Spain) Real Madrid	25	
13	(United States) Mike James	(Greece) Panathinaikos Superfoods	25	
14	(United States) Keith Langford (2)	(Russia) UNICS	36	
15	(United States) Keith Langford (3)	(Russia) UNICS	38	
16	(United States) Sonny Weems	(Israel) Maccabi Tel Aviv	33	
17	(Slovenia) Luka Dončić (2)	(Spain) Real Madrid	32	
18	(France) Nando de Colo (3)	(Russia) CSKA Moscow	35	
19	(Greece) Ioannis Bourousis	(Greece) Panathinaikos Superfoods	31	
20	(Czech Republic) Jan Veselý	(Turkey) Fenerbahçe	30	
21	(United States) Derrick Brown (2)	(Turkey) Anadolu Efes	33	
22	(Greece) Georgios Printezis	(Greece) Olympiacos	30	
23	(France) Nando de Colo (4)	(Russia) CSKA Moscow	35	
24	(France) Kim Tillie	(Spain) Baskonia	31	
25	(France) Nando de Colo (5)	(Russia) CSKA Moscow	26	
26	(Lithuania) Paulius Jankūnas	(Lithuania) Žalgiris	30	
27	(Spain) Sergio Llull (2)	(Spain) Real Madrid	32	
28	(United States) Anthony Randolph	(Spain) Real Madrid	30	
29	(United States) Brad Wanamaker	(Turkey) Darüşşafaka Doğuş	34	
30	(United States) Latavious Williams	(Russia) UNICS	34	

Playoffs

Game	Player	Team	PIR	Ref.
1	(Serbia) Bogdan Bogdanović	(Turkey) Fenerbahçe	35	
2	(Serbia) Bogdan Bogdanović (2)	(Turkey) Fenerbahçe	35	
3	(Mexico) Gustavo Ayón	(Spain) Real Madrid	23	
3	(Slovenia) Luka Dončić (3)	(Spain) Real Madrid	23	
3	(Armenia) Bryant Dunston	(Turkey) Anadolu Efes	23	
4	(Slovenia) Luka Dončić (4)	(Spain) Real Madrid	21	
5	(Greece) Vassilis Spanoulis (2)	(Greece) Olympiacos	22	

== 2017–18 ==
Regular season

Round	Player	Team	PIR	Ref.
1	(United States) Pierre Jackson	(Israel) Maccabi Tel Aviv	41	
2	(United States) Erick Green	(Spain) Valencia Basket	33	
3	(Slovenia) Luka Dončić	(Spain) Real Madrid	41	
4	(Slovenia) Luka Dončić (2)	(Spain) Real Madrid	35	
5	(France) Nando de Colo	(Russia) CSKA Moscow	37	
6	(Serbia) Vladimir Štimac	(Turkey) Anadolu Efes	29	
7	(United States) Errick McCollum	(Turkey) Anadolu Efes	33	
8	(Greece) Nick Calathes	(Greece) Panathinaikos Superfoods	42	
9	(Lithuania) Edgaras Ulanovas	(Lithuania) Žalgiris	32	
10	(France) Nando de Colo (2)	(Russia) CSKA Moscow	30	
10	(United States) James Gist	(Greece) Panathinaikos Superfoods	30	
11	(Russia) Alexey Shved	(Russia) Khimki	35	
12	(France) Vincent Poirier	(Spain) Kirolbet Baskonia	35	
13	(United States) Jamel McLean	(Greece) Olympiacos	30	
13	(Russia) Alexey Shved (2)	(Russia) Khimki	30	
14	(United States) Cory Higgins	(Russia) CSKA Moscow	31	
14	(Georgia (country)) Tornike Shengelia	(Spain) Kirolbet Baskonia	31	
15	(Slovenia) Luka Dončić (3)	(Spain) Real Madrid	37	
16	(United States) Malcolm Thomas	(Russia) Khimki	28	
17	(Slovenia) Zoran Dragić	(Turkey) Anadolu Efes	34	
18	(Russia) Alexey Shved (3)	(Russia) Khimki	33	
19	(United States) Brad Wanamaker	(Turkey) Fenerbahçe Doğuş	31	
20	(United States) Brad Wanamaker (2)	(Turkey) Fenerbahçe Doğuş	33	
21	(United States) Augustine Rubit	(Germany) Brose Bamberg	34	
22	(Czech Republic) Jan Veselý	(Turkey) Fenerbahçe Doğuş	36	
23	(Greece) Vassilis Spanoulis	(Greece) Olympiacos	29	
23	(United States) Dorell Wright	(Germany) Brose Bamberg	29	
24	(Georgia (country)) Tornike Shengelia (2)	(Spain) Kirolbet Baskonia	28	
25	(France) Fabien Causeur	(Spain) Real Madrid	29	
26	(Dominican Republic) James Feldeine	(Serbia) Crvena zvezda mts	32	
27	(Greece) Nick Calathes (2)	(Greece) Panathinaikos Superfoods	34	
28	(Georgia (country)) Ricky Hickman	(Germany) Brose Bamberg	29	
28	(Serbia) Nikola Milutinov	(Greece) Olympiacos	29	
29	(Slovenia) Luka Dončić (4)	(Spain) Real Madrid	35	
30	(Slovenia) Anthony Randolph	(Spain) Real Madrid	38	

Playoffs

Game	Player	Team	PIR	Ref.
1	(Greece) Nick Calathes (3)	(Greece) Panathinaikos Superfoods	29	
2	(Spain) Sergio Rodríguez	(Russia) CSKA Moscow	36	
3	(United States) Anthony Gill	(Russia) Khimki	29	
3	(Russia) Alexey Shved (4)	(Russia) Khimki	29	
4	(Lithuania) Edgaras Ulanovas (2)	(Lithuania) Žalgiris	27	

== 2018–19 ==
Regular season

Round	Player	Team	PIR	Ref.
1	(Czech Republic) Jan Veselý	(Turkey) Fenerbahçe Beko	34	
2	(Serbia) Nikola Milutinov	(Greece) Olympiacos	33	
2	(Slovenia) Anthony Randolph	(Spain) Real Madrid	33	
3	(Turkey) Scottie Wilbekin	(Israel) Maccabi Tel Aviv	30	
3	(France) Rodrigue Beaubois	(Turkey) Anadolu Efes	30	
4	(France) Nando de Colo	(Russia) CSKA Moscow	27	
5	(Mexico) Gustavo Ayón	(Spain) Real Madrid	30	
6	(United States) Cory Higgins	(Russia) CSKA Moscow	28	
7	(Dominican Republic) Eulis Báez	(Spain) Herbalife Gran Canaria	32	
8	(Russia) Alexey Shved	(Russia) Khimki	30	
9	(Russia) Alexey Shved (2)	(Russia) Khimki	32	
10	(United States) Zach LeDay	(Greece) Olympiacos	42	
11	(Mexico) Gustavo Ayón (2)	(Spain) Real Madrid	34	
12	(United States) Derrick Williams	(Germany) Bayern Munich	35	
13	(Serbia) Nikola Milutinov (2)	(Greece) Olympiacos	36	
14	(Greece) Vassilis Spanoulis	(Greece) Olympiacos	31	
15	(United States) Johnny O'Bryant III	(Israel) Maccabi Tel Aviv	44	
16	(Serbia) Nikola Milutinov (3)	(Greece) Olympiacos	41	
17	(Greece) Kostas Papanikolaou	(Greece) Olympiacos	31	
18	(Brazil) Marcelo Huertas	(Spain) Kirolbet Baskonia	29	
19	(United States) Will Clyburn	(Russia) CSKA Moscow	27	
20	(United States) Angelo Caloiaro	(Israel) Maccabi Tel Aviv	33	
21	(France) Nando de Colo	(Russia) CSKA Moscow	38	
22	(Croatia) Krunoslav Simon	(Turkey) Anadolu Efes	34	
23	(United States) Brandon Davies	(Lithuania) Žalgiris	34	
24	(Croatia) Ante Tomić	(Spain) FC Barcelona Lassa	28	
25	(Turkey) Shane Larkin	(Turkey) Anadolu Efes	43	
26	(United States) Mike James	(Italy) AX Armani Exchange Olimpia Milan	31	
27	(Nigeria) Micheal Eric	(Turkey) Darüşşafaka Tekfen	33	
28	(Greece) Nick Calathes	(Greece) Panathinaikos OPAP	39	
29	(United States) Toney Douglas	(Turkey) Darüşşafaka Tekfen	37	
30	(United States) Brandon Davies (2)	(Lithuania) Žalgiris	34	

Playoffs

Game	Player	Team	PIR	Ref.
1	(Serbia) Vasilije Micić	(Turkey) Anadolu Efes	30	
2	(France) Vincent Poirier	(Spain) Kirolbet Baskonia	32	
3	(Turkey) Shane Larkin (2)	(Turkey) Anadolu Efes	34	
4	(France) Nando de Colo (3)	(Russia) CSKA Moscow	35	
5	(Turkey) Shane Larkin (3)	(Turkey) Anadolu Efes	19	

== 2019–20 ==
Regular season

Round	Player	Team	PIR	Ref.
1	(United States) Mike James	(Russia) CSKA Moscow	28	
2	(Serbia) Vasilije Micić	(Turkey) Anadolu Efes	32	
3	(France) Nando de Colo	(Turkey) Fenerbahçe Beko	44	
4	(Georgia (country)) Tornike Shengelia	(Spain) Kirolbet Baskonia	25	
5	(Serbia) Vasilije Micić (2)	(Turkey) Anadolu Efes	29	
6	(Georgia (country)) Tornike Shengelia (2)	(Spain) Kirolbet Baskonia	28	
7	(United States) Cory Higgins	(Spain) Barcelona	33	
8	(United States) Mike James (2)	(Russia) CSKA Moscow	38	
9	(Greece) Nick Calathes	(Greece) Panathinaikos OPAP	32	
9	(United States) Luke Sikma	(Germany) ALBA Berlin	32	
10	(Spain) Nikola Mirotić	(Spain) Barcelona	35	
11	(Turkey) Shane Larkin	(Turkey) Anadolu Efes	53	
12	(Greece) Kostas Sloukas	(Turkey) Fenerbahçe Beko	39	
13	(United States) Devin Booker	(Russia) Khimki	36	
14	(United States) Mike James (3)	(Russia) CSKA Moscow	32	
15	(United States) Mike James (4)	(Russia) CSKA Moscow	36	
16	(Montenegro) Bojan Dubljević	(Spain) Valencia Basket	42	
17	(Greece) Nick Calathes (2)	(Greece) Panathinaikos OPAP	40	
18	(Turkey) Shane Larkin (2)	(Turkey) Anadolu Efes	35	
19	(Turkey) Shane Larkin (3)	(Turkey) Anadolu Efes	30	
20	(Turkey) Shane Larkin (4)	(Turkey) Anadolu Efes	45	
21	(Turkey) Shane Larkin (5)	(Turkey) Anadolu Efes	36	
22	(Montenegro) Bojan Dubljević (2)	(Spain) Valencia Basket	26	
23	(Spain) Nikola Mirotić (2)	(Spain) Barcelona	32	
24	(United States) Malcolm Delaney	(Spain) Barcelona	37	
25	(Iceland) Martin Hermannsson	(Germany) ALBA Berlin	27	
26	(Russia) Alexey Shved	(Russia) Khimki	37	
27	(Cape Verde) Edy Tavares	(Spain) Real Madrid	29	
28	(Turkey) Shane Larkin (6)	(Turkey) Anadolu Efes	44	

== 2020–21 ==
Regular season

Round	Player	Team	PIR	Ref.
1	(United States) Pierriá Henry	(Spain) TD Systems Baskonia	32	
2	(United States) Jordan Loyd	(Serbia) Crvena zvezda mts	34	
3–4	(Serbia) Vladimir Lučić	(Germany) Bayern Munich	53	
5	(Serbia) Nemanja Nedović	(Greece) Panathinaikos OPAP	28	
6	(Spain) Nikola Mirotić	(Spain) Barcelona	27	
6	(Lithuania) Marius Grigonis	(Lithuania) Žalgiris	27	
7	(France) Rodrigue Beaubois	(Turkey) Anadolu Efes	36	
8	(Serbia) Vladimir Lučić (2)	(Germany) Bayern Munich	35	
9–10	(United States) Mike James	(Russia) CSKA Moscow	32	
11	(United States) Luke Sikma	(Germany) ALBA Berlin	32	
12	(Cape Verde) Edy Tavares	(Spain) Real Madrid	29	
13	(United States) Mike James (2)	(Russia) CSKA Moscow	51	
14–15	(Cape Verde) Edy Tavares (2)	(Spain) Real Madrid	36	
16	(Turkey) Shane Larkin	(Turkey) Anadolu Efes	37	
17	(United States) Wade Baldwin	(Germany) Bayern Munich	41	
18	(France) Joffrey Lauvergne	(Lithuania) Žalgiris	38	
19–20	(Serbia) Nemanja Nedović (2)	(Greece) Panathinaikos OPAP	33	
21	(Greece) Dinos Mitoglou	(Greece) Panathinaikos OPAP	42	
22–23	(United States) Nick Weiler-Babb	(Germany) Bayern Munich	38	
24	(Serbia) Vasilije Micić	(Turkey) Anadolu Efes	30	
24	(United States) Jalen Reynolds	(Germany) Bayern Munich	30	
25	(Turkey) Shane Larkin (2)	(Turkey) Anadolu Efes	32	
26	(Serbia) Vasilije Micić (2)	(Turkey) Anadolu Efes	44	
27–28	(Sweden) Marcus Eriksson	(Germany) ALBA Berlin	41	
29	(United States) Kevin Punter	(Italy) A|X Armani Exchange Milan	28	
29	(United States) Peyton Siva	(Germany) ALBA Berlin	28	
30	(Bulgaria) Sasha Vezenkov	(Greece) Olympiacos	41	
31	(Serbia) Vasilije Micić (3)	(Turkey) Anadolu Efes	30	
32–33	(United States) Jordan Mickey	(Russia) Khimki	36	
32–33	(Italy) Achille Polonara	(Spain) TD Systems Baskonia	36	
34	(Bulgaria) Sasha Vezenkov (2)	(Greece) Olympiacos	31	

Playoffs

Round	Player	Team	PIR	Ref.
1–2	(Canada) Kevin Pangos	(Russia) Zenit	33	
1–2	(Uganda) Brandon Davies	(Spain) Barcelona	33	
3–4	(United States) Will Clyburn	(Russia) CSKA Moscow	38	
5	(Denmark) Shavon Shields	(Italy) A|X Armani Exchange Milan	41	

== 2021–22 ==
Regular season

Round	Player	Team	PIR	Ref.
1	(United States) Scottie Wilbekin	(Israel) Maccabi Playtika Tel Aviv	32	
2	(Georgia (country)) Tornike Shengelia	(Russia) CSKA Moscow	29	
3	(Georgia (country)) Tornike Shengelia (2)	(Russia) CSKA Moscow	37	
4	(Uganda) Brandon Davies	(Spain) Barcelona	38	
5	(United States) Will Clyburn	(Russia) CSKA Moscow	32	
6	(United States) Daryl Macon	(Greece) Panathinaikos OPAP	38	
7	(France) Élie Okobo	(France) LDLC ASVEL	37	
8	(United States) Chris Jones	(France) LDLC ASVEL	27	
9	(Spain) Nikola Mirotić	(Spain) Barcelona	37	
10	(United States) Scottie Wilbekin (2)	(Israel) Maccabi Playtika Tel Aviv	37	
11	(United States) Lorenzo Brown	(Russia) UNICS	31	
12	(France) William Howard	(France) LDLC ASVEL	33	
13	(Bulgaria) Sasha Vezenkov	(Greece) Olympiacos	26	
14	(Spain) Nikola Mirotić (2)	(Spain) Barcelona	39	
15	(United States) Mike James	(France) AS Monaco	31	
15	(Serbia) Vasilije Micić	(Turkey) Anadolu Efes	31	
16	(Turkey) Shane Larkin	(Turkey) Anadolu Efes	37	
17	(United States) Wade Baldwin	(Spain) Bitci Baskonia	33	
18	(United States) Billy Baron	(Russia) Zenit Saint Petersburg	30	
19	(Turkey) Shane Larkin (2)	(Turkey) Anadolu Efes	30	
20	(Italy) Daniel Hackett	(Russia) CSKA Moscow	26	
21	(Italy) Daniel Hackett (2)	(Russia) CSKA Moscow	38	
22	(Croatia) Ante Žižić	(Israel) Maccabi Playtika Tel Aviv	33	
23	(Serbia) Nikola Milutinov	(Russia) CSKA Moscow	28	
24	(United States) James Nunnally	(Israel) Maccabi Playtika Tel Aviv	38	
25	(Serbia) Nikola Milutinov (2)	(Russia) CSKA Moscow	36	
26	(Argentina) Nicolás Laprovíttola	(Spain) Barcelona	27	
27	(Serbia) Vasilije Micić (2)	(Turkey) Anadolu Efes	30	
28	(Australia) Dante Exum	(Spain) Barcelona	31	
29	(Germany) Maodo Lô	(Germany) ALBA Berlin	34	
30	(United States) Wade Baldwin (2)	(Spain) Bitci Baskonia	29	
31	(Serbia) Vasilije Micić (3)	(Turkey) Anadolu Efes	29	
31	(Cuba) Howard Sant-Roos	(Greece) Panathinaikos	29	
32	(Bulgaria) Sasha Vezenkov (2)	(Greece) Olympiacos	36	
33	(Turkey) Shane Larkin (3)	(Turkey) Anadolu Efes	36	
34	(Greece) Georgios Papagiannis	(Greece) Panathinaikos	31	

Playoffs

Round	Player	Team	PIR	Ref.
1	(Uganda) Brandon Davies (2)	(Spain) Barcelona	24	
2	(France) Vincent Poirier	(Spain) Real Madrid	31	
3	(Spain) Nikola Mirotić (3)	(Spain) Barcelona	31	
4	(Germany) Tibor Pleiß	(Turkey) Anadolu Efes	37	
5	(Argentina) Nicolás Laprovíttola	(Spain) Barcelona	30	

== 2022–23 ==
Regular season

Round	Player	Team	PIR	Ref.
1	(Estonian Basketball Association) Maik Kotsar	(Spanish Basketball Federation) Cazoo Baskonia	31	
2	(Bulgarian Basketball Federation) Sasha Vezenkov	(Hellenic Basketball Federation) Olympiacos	37	
3	(USA Basketball) Luke Sikma	(German Basketball Federation) ALBA Berlin	33	
4	(USA Basketball) Mike James	(France) AS Monaco	29	
4	(Bulgarian Basketball Federation) Sasha Vezenkov (2)	(Greece) Olympiacos	29	
4	(Italian Basketball Federation) Nicolò Melli	(Italy) EA7 Emporio Armani Milan	29	
5	(Spanish Basketball Federation) Lorenzo Brown	(Israeli Basketball Association) Maccabi Playtika Tel Aviv	33	
6	(Basketball Federation of Bosnia and Herzegovina) Džanan Musa	(Spanish Basketball Federation) Real Madrid	31	
7	(USA Basketball) Johnathan Motley	(Turkey) Fenerbahçe Beko	33	
7	(Basketball Federation of Armenia) Chris Jones	(Spain) Valencia Basket	33	
8	(Bulgarian Basketball Federation) Sasha Vezenkov (3)	(Greece) Olympiacos	43	
9	(Basketball Federation of Bosnia and Herzegovina) Džanan Musa (2)	(Spanish Basketball Federation) Real Madrid	32	
10	(Bulgarian Basketball Federation) Sasha Vezenkov (4)	(Greece) Olympiacos	34	
11	(Basketball Federation of Serbia) Vasilije Micić	(Turkey) Anadolu Efes	31	
12	(USA Basketball) Dwayne Bacon	(Greece) Panathinaikos	28	
12	(Fédération Sénégalaise de Basket-Ball) Pierriá Henry	(Spanish Basketball Federation) Cazoo Baskonia	28	
13	(Basketball Federation of Montenegro) Bojan Dubljević	(Spain) Valencia Basket	33	
14	(Uganda) Brandon Davies	(Italy) EA7 Emporio Armani Milan	30	
15	(USA Basketball) Keenan Evans	(Lithuania) Žalgiris	39	
16	(French Federation of Basketball) Élie Okobo	(France) AS Monaco	35	
17	(Basketball Federation of Serbia) Filip Petrušev	(Serbia) Crvena zvezda Meridianbet	36	
18	(Federaçao Caboverdiana de Basquetbol) Edy Tavares	(Spanish Basketball Federation) Real Madrid	35	
19	(USA Basketball) Johnathan Motley (2)	(Turkey) Fenerbahçe Beko	38	
20	(USA Basketball) Wade Baldwin	(Israeli Basketball Association) Maccabi Playtika Tel Aviv	35	
21	(USA Basketball) Darius Thompson	(Spanish Basketball Federation) Cazoo Baskonia	36	
22	(USA Basketball) Will Clyburn	(Turkish Basketball Federation) Anadolu Efes	27	
23	(United States) Nigel Hayes	(Turkey) Fenerbahçe Beko	37	
24	(Bulgarian Basketball Federation) Sasha Vezenkov (5)	(Greece) Olympiacos	40	
25	(Serbia) Marko Gudurić	(Turkey) Fenerbahçe Beko	35	
26	(United States) Will Clyburn (2)	(Turkey) Anadolu Efes	32	
27	(Australia) Dante Exum	(Serbia) Partizan Mozzart Bet	33	
28	(Argentina) Gabriel Deck	(Spain) Real Madrid	26	
28	(Nigeria) Chima Moneke	(France) AS Monaco	26	
29	(Bosnia and Herzegovina) Džanan Musa (3)	(Spain) Real Madrid	38	
30	(France) Guerschon Yabusele	(Spain) Real Madrid	30	
31	(Estonia) Maik Kotsar (2)	(Spain) Cazoo Baskonia	40	
31	(Greece) Georgios Papagiannis	(Greece) Panathinaikos	40	
32	(United States) Thomas Walkup	(Greece) Olympiacos	32	
33	(United States) Darius Thompson (2)	(Spain) Cazoo Baskonia	36	
34	(Italy) Daniel Hackett	(Italy) Virtus Segafredo Bologna	36	

Playoffs

Round	Player	Team	PIR	Ref.
1	(United States) Kevin Punter	(Serbia) Partizan Mozzart Bet	33	
2	(United States) Jordan Loyd	(France) AS Monaco	36	
3	(Cape Verde) Edy Tavares (2)	(Spain) Real Madrid	41	
4	(Cape Verde) Edy Tavares (3)	(Spain) Real Madrid	30	
5	(Greece) Kostas Sloukas	(Greece) Olympiacos	27	

== 2023–24 ==
Regular season

Round	Player	Team	PIR	Ref.
1	(Bosnia and Herzegovina) Alec Peters	(Greece) Olympiacos	31	
2	(France) Guerschon Yabusele	(Spain) Real Madrid	39	
3	(Georgia (country)) Tornike Shengelia	(Italy) Virtus Segafredo Bologna	32	
4	(Serbia) Nikola Milutinov	(Greece) Olympiacos	30	
5	(France) Mathias Lessort	(Greece) Panathinaikos	31	
6	(Georgia (country)) Tornike Shengelia (2)	(Italy) Virtus Segafredo Bologna	30	
7	(Argentina) Facundo Campazzo	(Spain) Real Madrid	39	
8	(Bulgaria) Codi Miller-McIntyre	(Spain) Baskonia	29	
9	(Nigeria) Chima Moneke	(Spain) Baskonia	35	
10	(United States) Shane Larkin	(Turkey) Anadolu Efes	38	
10	(Germany) Maodo Lô	(Italy) EA7 Emporio Armani Milan	38	
11	(Spain) Serge Ibaka	(Germany) Bayern Munich	34	
12	(United States) Tyrique Jones	(Turkey) Anadolu Efes	36	
13	(United States) Shane Larkin (2)	(Turkey) Anadolu Efes	41	
14	(Greece) Kostas Sloukas	(Greece) Panathinaikos	29	
15	(United States) Josh Nebo	(Israel) Maccabi Playtika Tel Aviv	25	
15	(United States) Kevin Punter	(Serbia) Partizan Mozzart Bet	25	
15	(Denmark) Shavon Shields	(Italy) EA7 Emporio Armani Milan	25	
16	(Serbia) Miloš Teodosić	(Serbia) Crvena zvezda Meridianbet	40	
17	(Germany) Johannes Voigtmann	(Italy) EA7 Emporio Armani Milan	29	
18	(Nigeria) Chima Moneke (2)	(Spain) Baskonia	34	
18	(United States) Bonzie Colson	(Israel) Maccabi Playtika Tel Aviv	34	
19	(Bosnia and Herzegovina) Džanan Musa	(Spain) Real Madrid	45	
20	(United States) Wade Baldwin	(Israel) Maccabi Playtika Tel Aviv	29	
21	(France) Mathias Lessort (2)	(Greece) Panathinaikos	42	
22	(Serbia) Nikola Milutinov (2)	(Greece) Olympiacos	40	
23	(United States) Wade Baldwin (2)	(Israel) Maccabi Playtika Tel Aviv (2)	33	
24	(United States) Mike James	(France) AS Monaco	31	
25	(United States) Keenan Evans	(Lithuania) Žalgiris	35	
26	(Bulgaria) Codi Miller-McIntyre (2)	(Spain) Baskonia	42	
27	(France) Mathias Lessort (3)	(Greece) Panathinaikos	33	
28	(United States) Shane Larkin (3)	(Turkey) Anadolu Efes	33	
29	(Nigeria) Josh Nebo (2)	(Israel) Maccabi Playtika Tel Aviv	33	
30	(United States) Wade Baldwin (2)	(Israel) Maccabi Playtika Tel Aviv	46	
31	(United States) Elijah Bryant	(Turkey) Anadolu Efes	33	
31	(Croatia) Mario Hezonja	(Spain) Real Madrid	33	
32	(United States) Nigel Hayes-Davis	(Turkey) Fenerbahçe	46	
33	(United States) Will Clyburn	(Turkey) Anadolu Efes	28	
34	(Puerto Rico) Markus Howard	(Spain) Baskonia	27	
34	(United States) James Nunnally	(Serbia) Partizan Mozzart Bet	27	
34	(Greece) Kostas Sloukas (2)	(Greece) Panathinaikos	27	

Play-in

Round	Player	Team	PIR	Ref.
Play-in	(Spain) Lorenzo Brown	(Israel) Maccabi Playtika Tel Aviv	35	

Playoffs

Round	Player	Team	PIR	Ref.
1	(United States) Nigel Hayes-Davis (2)	(Turkey) Fenerbahçe Beko	23	
2	(Argentina) Facundo Campazzo (2)	(Spain) Real Madrid	33	
3	(Nigeria) Josh Nebo (3)	(Israel) Maccabi Playtika Tel Aviv	31	
4	(Greece) Kostas Sloukas (3)	(Greece) Panathinaikos AKTOR	32	
5	(United States) Kendrick Nunn	(Greece) Panathinaikos AKTOR	27	

== 2024–25 ==
Regular season

Round	Player	Team	PIR	Ref.
1	(Israel) Tamir Blatt	(Israeli Basketball Association) Maccabi Playtika Tel Aviv	36	
2	(France) Neal Sako	(French Federation of Basketball) LDLC ASVEL	30	
2	(Bulgaria) Sasha Vezenkov	(Hellenic Basketball Federation) Olympiacos	30	
3	(Bulgaria) Sasha Vezenkov (2)	(Hellenic Basketball Federation) Olympiacos	31	
4	(France) Théo Maledon	(French Federation of Basketball) LDLC ASVEL	36	
5	(North Macedonia) T. J. Shorts	(French Federation of Basketball) Paris Basketball	38	
6	(Puerto Rico) Shabazz Napier	(German Basketball Federation) Bayern Munich	26	
7	(United States) Zach LeDay	(Italian Basketball Federation) EA7 Emporio Armani Milan	29	
8	(Czech Republic) Jan Veselý	(Spanish Basketball Federation) FC Barcelona	28	
9	(Serbia) Filip Petrušev	(Basketball Federation of Serbia) Crvena zvezda Meridianbet	38	
10	(France) Théo Maledon (2)	(French Federation of Basketball) LDLC ASVEL	36	
10	(North Macedonia) T. J. Shorts (2)	(French Federation of Basketball) Paris Basketball	36	
11	(France) Élie Okobo	(French Federation of Basketball) Monaco	36	
12	(Cape Verde) Edy Tavares	(Spanish Basketball Federation) Real Madrid	39	
13	(France) Théo Maledon (3)	(French Federation of Basketball) LDLC ASVEL	31	
14	(United States) Nigel Hayes-Davis	(Turkish Basketball Federation) Fenerbahçe Beko	30	
15	(United States) Zach LeDay (2)	(Italian Basketball Federation) EA7 Emporio Armani Milan	37	
16	(Bulgaria) Sasha Vezenkov (3)	(Hellenic Basketball Federation) Olympiacos	38	
17	(France) Isaïa Cordinier	(Italian Basketball Federation) Virtus Segafredo Bologna	38	
18	(France) Jaylen Hoard	(Israeli Basketball Association) Maccabi Playtika Tel Aviv	34	
19	(Turkey) Ömer Yurtseven	(Hellenic Basketball Federation) Panathinaikos AKTOR	34	
20	(Bulgaria) Sasha Vezenkov (4)	(Hellenic Basketball Federation) Olympiacos	52	
21	(Argentina) Facundo Campazzo	(Spanish Basketball Federation) Real Madrid	43	
22	(South Sudan) Carlik Jones	(Basketball Federation of Serbia) Partizan Mozzart Bet	37	
23	(United States) Carsen Edwards	(German Basketball Federation) Bayern Munich	34	
24	(United States) Zach LeDay (3)	(Italian Basketball Federation) EA7 Emporio Armani Milan	39	
25	(Bulgaria) Sasha Vezenkov (5)	(Hellenic Basketball Federation) Olympiacos	30	
26	(United States) Kendrick Nunn	(Hellenic Basketball Federation) Panathinaikos AKTOR	37	
27	(South Sudan) Carlik Jones (2)	(Basketball Federation of Serbia) Partizan Mozzart Bet	31	
27	(France) Sylvain Francisco	(Lithuanian Basketball Federation) Žalgiris	31	
28	(United States) Carsen Edwards (2)	(German Basketball Federation) Bayern Munich	29	
28	(France) Vincent Poirier	(Turkish Basketball Federation) Anadolu Efes	29	
29	(Turkey) Shane Larkin	(Turkish Basketball Federation) Anadolu Efes	33	
30	(North Macedonia) T. J. Shorts (3)	(French Federation of Basketball) Paris Basketball	37	
31	(United States) Kendrick Nunn (2)	(Hellenic Basketball Federation) Panathinaikos AKTOR	34	
32	(North Macedonia) T. J. Shorts (4)	(French Federation of Basketball) Paris Basketball	36	
33	(United States) Kendrick Nunn (3)	(Hellenic Basketball Federation) Panathinaikos AKTOR	43	
34	(Spain) Nikola Mirotić	(Italian Basketball Federation) EA7 Emporio Armani Milan	40	

Play-in

Round	Player	Team	PIR	Ref.
Play-in	(North Macedonia) T. J. Shorts (5)	(French Federation of Basketball) Paris Basketball	27	

Playoffs

Round	Player	Team	PIR	Ref.
1	(Spain) Juancho Hernangómez	(Hellenic Basketball Federation) Panathinaikos AKTOR	40	
2	(France) Mam Jaiteh	(French Federation of Basketball) Monaco	27	
2	(Turkey) Shane Larkin (2)	(Turkish Basketball Federation) Anadolu Efes	27	
3	(Spain) Willy Hernangómez	(Spanish Basketball Federation) Barcelona	31	
3	(United States) Kendrick Nunn (4)	(Hellenic Basketball Federation) Panathinaikos AKTOR	31	
4	(France) Evan Fournier	(Hellenic Basketball Federation) Olympiacos	18	
5	(Turkey) Cedi Osman	(Hellenic Basketball Federation) Panathinaikos AKTOR	32	

== 2025–26 ==
Regular season

Round	Player	Team	PIR	Ref.
1	(United States) Kendrick Nunn	(Hellenic Basketball Federation) Panathinaikos AKTOR	29	
2	(Spain) Nikola Mirotić	(French Federation of Basketball) Monaco	32	
3	(Bulgaria) Sasha Vezenkov	(Hellenic Basketball Federation) Olympiacos	34	
4	(Nigeria) Jordan Nwora	(Basketball Federation of Serbia) Crvena zvezda Meridianbet	34	
5	(Bulgaria) Sasha Vezenkov (2)	(Hellenic Basketball Federation) Olympiacos	31	
6	(Israel) Roman Sorkin	(Israeli Basketball Association) Maccabi Tel Aviv	30	
7	(France) Sylvain Francisco	(Lithuanian Basketball Federation) Žalgiris	35	
7	(Nigeria) Chima Moneke	(Basketball Federation of Serbia) Crvena zvezda Meridianbet	35	
8	(Georgia (country)) Tornike Shengelia	(Spanish Basketball Federation) FC Barcelona	42	
9	(United States) Mike James	(French Federation of Basketball) Monaco	37	
10	(United States) Elijah Bryant	(Israeli Basketball Association) Hapoel Tel Aviv	38	
11	(France) Isaïa Cordinier	(Turkish Basketball Federation) Anadolu Efes	29	
12	(France) Théo Maledon	(Spanish Basketball Federation) Real Madrid	34	
13	(United States) Kendrick Nunn (2)	(Hellenic Basketball Federation) Panathinaikos AKTOR	39	
13	(Denmark) Shavon Shields	(Italian Basketball Federation) EA7 Emporio Armani Milan	39	
14	(France) Élie Okobo	(French Federation of Basketball) Monaco	39	
15	(United States) Will Clyburn	(Spanish Basketball Federation) FC Barcelona	33	
15	(United States) Lonnie Walker IV	(Israeli Basketball Association) Maccabi Tel Aviv	33	
16	(United States) Elijah Bryant (2)	(Israeli Basketball Association) Hapoel Tel Aviv	37	
17	(United States) Kevin Punter	(Spanish Basketball Federation) FC Barcelona	40	
18	(France) Bastien Vautier	(French Federation of Basketball) LDLC ASVEL	31	
19	(United States) Wade Baldwin IV	(Turkish Basketball Federation) Fenerbahçe Beko	29	
20	(Germany) Andreas Obst	(German Basketball Federation) Bayern Munich	38	
21	(Bulgaria) Sasha Vezenkov (3)	(Hellenic Basketball Federation) Olympiacos	35	
22	(Italy) Saliou Niang	(Italian Basketball Federation) Virtus Bologna	36	
23	(Nigeria) Ebuka Izundu	(Basketball Federation of Serbia) Crvena zvezda Meridianbet	36	
24	(United States) Kevin Punter (2)	(Spanish Basketball Federation) FC Barcelona	34	
25	(Greece) Kostas Sloukas	(Hellenic Basketball Federation) Panathinaikos AKTOR	36	
26	(Canada) Mfiondu Kabengele	(United Arab Emirates Basketball Association) Dubai Basketball	30	
27	(Dominican Republic) Jean Montero	(Spanish Basketball Federation) Valencia Basket	38	
28	(United States) Moses Wright	(Lithuanian Basketball Federation) Žalgiris	34	
29	(France) Sylvain Francisco (2)	(Lithuanian Basketball Federation) Žalgiris	36	
30	(Colombia) Braian Angola	(French Federation of Basketball) LDLC ASVEL	28	
31	(Turkey) Cedi Osman	(Hellenic Basketball Federation) Panathinaikos AKTOR	36	
32	(United States) Dwayne Bacon	(United Arab Emirates Basketball Association) Dubai Basketball	27	
32	(Israel) Tamir Blatt	(Israeli Basketball Association) Maccabi Tel Aviv	27	
33	(Nigeria) Chima Moneke (2)	(Basketball Federation of Serbia) Crvena zvezda Meridianbet	32	
34	(United States) Sterling Brown	(Basketball Federation of Serbia) Partizan Mozzart Bet	32	
35	(Hungary) Nate Reuvers	(Spanish Basketball Federation) Valencia Basket	44	
36	(Greece) Tyler Dorsey	(Hellenic Basketball Federation) Olympiacos	43	
37	(United States) Justin Robinson	(French Federation of Basketball) Paris Basketball	35	
38	(United States) Moses Wright (2)	(Lithuanian Basketball Federation) Žalgiris	43	

Play-in

Round	Player	Team	PIR	Ref.
Play-in	(North Macedonia) T. J. Shorts	(Hellenic Basketball Federation) Panathinaikos AKTOR	24	

Playoffs

Round	Player	Team	PIR	Ref.
1	(Serbia) Nikola Milutinov	(Hellenic Basketball Federation) Olympiacos	25	
2	(Argentina) Facundo Campazzo	(Spanish Basketball Federation) Real Madrid	30	
3	(Lithuania) Ąžuolas Tubelis	(Lithuanian Basketball Federation) Žalgiris	31	
4	(Dominican Republic) Jean Montero (2)	(Spanish Basketball Federation) Valencia Basket	45	
5	(Senegal) Brancou Badio	(Spanish Basketball Federation) Valencia Basket	25	

== 2026–27 ==
Regular season

Round	Player	Team	PIR	Ref.
1	(South Sudan) Carlik Jones	(Basketball Federation of Serbia) Partizan Mozzart Bet	33	
2	(United States) Elijah Bryant	(Israeli Basketball Association) Hapoel IBI Tel Aviv	31	
3	(United States) Elijah Bryant (2)	(Israeli Basketball Association) Hapoel IBI Tel Aviv	40	
4	(France) Mathias Lessort	(Hellenic Basketball Federation) Panathinaikos AKTOR	30	
5	(Dominican Republic) Jean Montero	(Hellenic Basketball Federation) Olympiacos	35	
6	(Bulgaria) Sasha Vezenkov	(Hellenic Basketball Federation) Olympiacos	38	
7	(Azerbaijan) Zach LeDay	(Israeli Basketball Association) Hapoel IBI Tel Aviv	33	
7	(North Macedonia) T. J. Shorts	(Spanish Basketball Federation) Valencia Basket	33	
8	(United States) Antonio Blakeney	(Israeli Basketball Association) Hapoel IBI Tel Aviv	35	
8	(United States) Elijah Bryant (3)	(Israeli Basketball Association) Hapoel IBI Tel Aviv	35	
9	(United States) Lonnie Walker IV	(Turkish Basketball Federation) Beşiktaş	36	
10	(France) Nadir Hifi	(French Federation of Basketball) Paris Basketball	39	
11	(Lithuania) Jonas Valančiūnas	(Lithuanian Basketball Federation) Žalgiris	36	
12	(Bulgaria) Sasha Vezenkov (2)	(Hellenic Basketball Federation) Olympiacos	41	
13	(North Macedonia) Moses Wright	(Italian Basketball Federation) Armani Olimpia Milan	36	

== Statistics ==
=== Wins by player ===
^	Player is still active in the EuroLeague
†	Player is inducted as EuroLeague Legend

- Player nationalities by national team.

MVP of the Round	Number of awards
(United States) (Turkey) Shane Larkin^	19
(Bulgaria) Sasha Vezenkov^	19
(France) Nando de Colo	16
(United States) Mike James^	12
(Spain) Nikola Mirotić^	11
(Turkey) Mirsad Türkcan†	11
(Serbia) Vasilije Micić^	10
(Serbia) Nikola Milutinov^	9
(Georgia (country)) Tornike Shengelia^	9
(Greece) Ioannis Bourousis	8
(Slovenia) Luka Dončić	8
(Greece) Vassilis Spanoulis†	8
(United States) Wade Baldwin^	8
(United States) Will Clyburn^	7
(Spain) Rudy Fernández	7
(United States) Kendrick Nunn^	7
(United States) Anthony Parker	7
(North Macedonia) T. J. Shorts^	7
(Russia) Alexey Shved	7
(Croatia) Ante Tomić	7
(Cape Verde) Edy Tavares^	7
(Mexico) Gustavo Ayón	6
(United States) Elijah Bryant^	6
(Greece) Nick Calathes	6
(Uganda) Brandon Davies	6
(United States) Scoonie Penn	6
(Greece) Kostas Sloukas^	6
(Serbia) Miloš Teodosić	6
(United States) Maceo Baston	5
(United States) Tanoka Beard	5
(Greece) Dimitris Diamantidis†	5
(Italy) Gregor Fučka	5
(United States) Lynn Greer	5
(Russia) Andrei Kirilenko	5
(United States) Keith Langford	5
(Azerbaijan) Zach LeDay^	5
(Nigeria) Chima Moneke^	5
(United States) Kevin Punter^	5
(Slovenia) Anthony Randolph	5
(Czech Republic) Jan Veselý	5

=== Wins by country (player's nationality) ===
	Country	MVP Awards
1.	United States	253
2.	Greece	58
3.	France	57
4.	Serbia	53
5.	Spain	47
6.	Turkey	38
7.	Croatia	31
8.	Slovenia	26
9.	Lithuania	24
10.	Bulgaria	23
11.	Italy	21
12.	Russia	18
13.	Georgia	15
14.	Argentina	14
14.	North Macedonia	14
16.	Israel	11
16.	Serbia and Montenegro	11
18.	Australia	10
18.	Nigeria	10
20.	Bosnia and Herzegovina	9
21.	Montenegro	8
22.	Brazil	7
22.	Cape Verde	7
22.	Dominican Republic	7
22.	Germany	7
26.	Mexico	6
27.	Czech Republic	5
28.	Azerbaijan	4
28.	Central African Republic	4
28.	Finland	4
28.	Uganda	4
32.	Belgium	3
32.	Denmark	3
32.	Puerto Rico	3
32.	South Sudan	3
36.	Armenia	2
36.	Belarus	2
36.	Canada	2
36.	Estonia	2
36.	Senegal	2
36.	Ukraine	2
42.	Colombia	1
42.	Cuba	1
42.	Great Britain	1
42.	Guyana	1
42.	Hungary	1
42.	Iceland	1
42.	Jamaica	1
42.	Latvia	1
42.	Sweden	1

=== Wins by club ===
	Club	MVP Awards
1.	(Spain) Real Madrid	66
2.	(Russia) CSKA Moscow	65
3.	(Greece) Olympiacos	63
4.	(Turkey) Anadolu Efes	62
4.	(Israel) Maccabi Tel Aviv	62
6.	(Greece) Panathinaikos	53
7.	(Spain) Saski Baskonia	50
8.	(Spain) Barcelona	42
9.	(Turkey) Fenerbahçe	30
10.	(Lithuania) Žalgiris	29
11.	(Italy) Mens Sana	23
12.	(Italy) Olimpia Milano	22
13.	(Serbia and Montenegro) / (Serbia) Partizan	20
14.	(Serbia) Crvena zvezda	14
15.	(Germany) Bayern Munich	13
16.	(France) AS Monaco	11
16.	(Spain) Valencia Basket	11
18.	(France) ASVEL	9
18.	(Croatia) Cibona	9
18.	(Italy) Fortitudo Bologna	9
18.	(Spain) Málaga	9
22.	(Germany) Brose Bamberg	8
22.	(Italy) Virtus Bologna	8
24.	(Slovenia) Cedevita Olimpija	7
24.	(Israel) Hapoel Tel Aviv	7
24.	(France) Paris Basketball	7
27.	(Italy) Pallacanestro Treviso	6
27.	(Turkey) Ülker	6
29.	(Serbia and Montenegro) Budućnost	4
30.	(Russia) Dynamo Moscow	3
30.	(Lithuania) Rytas	3
30.	(Poland) Śląsk Wrocław	3
30.	(Russia) Ural Great Perm	3
30.	(Italy) Victoria Libertas	3
35.	(Greece) AEK	2
35.	(United Arab Emirates) Dubai Basketball	2
35.	(France) Élan Béarnais	2
35.	(Greece) PAOK	2
35.	(Russia) Saint Petersburg Lions	2
40.	(Turkey) Beşiktaş	1
40.	(Israel) Hapoel Jerusalem	1
40.	(Slovenia) Krka	1
40.	(France) Le Mans	1
40.	(Belgium) Oostende	1
40.	(Greece) Peristeri	1
40.	(France) SIG Strasbourg	1
40.	(Germany) Skyliners Frankfurt	1
40.	(Belgium) Spirou Charleroi	1
40.	(Germany) RheinStars Köln	1
40.	(Croatia) Zadar	1

== See also ==
- EuroLeague Awards
- 50 Greatest EuroLeague Contributors
- EuroLeague Basketball 2001–10 All-Decade Team
