= Croatian Basketball Federation =

Governing body of basketball in Croatia

- Sport: Basketball
- Jurisdiction: Croatia
- Abbreviation: HKS
- Founded: 17 November 1991; 34 years ago
- Affiliation: FIBA
- Affiliation date: 1992
- Regional affiliation: FIBA Europe
- Headquarters: Zagreb
- President: Nikola Rukavina
- Secretary: Josip Vranković
- Men's coach: Tomislav Mijatović
- Women's coach: Stipe Bralić
- Replaced: Basketball Federation of Yugoslavia (1948–1992)

Official website
- www.hks-cbf.hr
- (Croatia)

The Croatian Basketball Federation (Croatian: Hrvatski košarkaški savez) is a non-profit organization and the national sports governing body of basketball in Croatia.

It was founded on 19 December 1948 as a member of the larger Basketball Federation of Yugoslavia. On 19 January 1992, the HKS joined the International Basketball Federation (FIBA). Croatia competes in the European region of FIBA.

The Federation runs the men's national team and the women's national team.

== Major competitions ==
Competitions	Men	Women
Regional league	ABA League First Division; ABA League Second Division	WABA League
National league	Super Sport Premijer liga	Premijer ženska liga
National cup	Krešimir Ćosić Cup	Ružica Meglaj-Rimac Cup

=== Current champions ===
Competitions	Men	Women
Adriatic League	(Serbia) Crvena zvezda (2018–19 First Division) (Slovenia) Sixt Primorska (2018–19 Second Division)	(Bulgaria) Beroe (2018–19)
National League	Cibona (2018–19)	Medveščak (2018–19)
National Cup	Zadar (2019–20)	Medveščak (2018–19)

== List of presidents ==
- Anton Kovačev (1995–?)
- Boris Lalić (?–?)
- Marijan Hanžeković (1998–1999)
- Damir Skansi (1999–?)
- Ivan Šuker (2002–2004)
- Danko Radić (2004–2015)
- Ivan Šuker (2015–2016)
- Stojko Vranković (2016–present)

== See also ==
- Croatian Basketball All-Star Game
