= Marcelić =

Marcelić (Croatian pronunciation: [mâːrtselitɕ]) is a Croatian surname. Notable people with the surname include:

- Bruno Marcelić (1943–2016), Croatian basketball player
- Davor Marcelić, Croatian basketball player
- Ivan Marcelić, Croatian water polo player
