= Stojko Vranković =

Croatian basketball player (born 1964)

President of the Croatian Basketball Federation (HKS)
- In office 19 November 2016 – 12 September 2022
- Preceded by: Ivan Šuker
- Succeeded by: Nikola Rukavina

Personal details
- Born: Stojan Vranković; 22 January 1964 (age 62) Drniš, SR Croatia, SFR Yugoslavia
- Spouse: Lovorka Vranković
- Children: 3
- Occupation: Basketball player Basketball administrator
- Basketball career

Personal information
- Listed height: 7 ft 2 in (2.18 m)
- Listed weight: 260 lb (118 kg)

Career information
- NBA draft: 1986: undrafted
- Playing career: 1982–2001
- Position: Center
- Number: 52, 11

Career history
- 1982–1989: Zadar
- 1989–1990: Aris
- 1990–1992: Boston Celtics
- 1992–1996: Panathinaikos
- 1996–1997: Minnesota Timberwolves
- 1997–1999: Los Angeles Clippers
- 1999–2001: Fortitudo Bologna

Career highlights
- EuroLeague champion (1996); FIBA European Selection (1987); FIBA EuroStar (1999); Yugoslav League champion (1986); Greek League champion (1990); Italian League champion (2000); 3× Greek Cup winner (1990, 1993, 1996); 2× Greek League All-Star (1994 I, 1996 I); Greek All-Star Game MVP (1994 II); Greek League Hall of Fame (2022); EuroLeague records since the 2000–01 season: Most blocked shots in a game
- Stats at NBA.com
- Stats at Basketball Reference
Medals
Men's basketball
Representing Yugoslavia
Summer Olympic Games
Silver medal – second place	1988 Seoul
FIBA World Cup
Bronze medal – third place	1986 Spain
EuroBasket
Bronze medal – third place	1987 Greece
Gold medal – first place	1989 Yugoslavia
Summer Universiade
Gold medal – first place	1987 Zagreb
European Championship for Juniors
Silver medal – second place	1982 Bulgaria	Under-18
Representing Croatia
Summer Olympic Games
Silver medal – second place	1992 Barcelona
FIBA World Cup
Bronze medal – third place	1994 Canada
FIBA EuroBasket
Bronze medal – third place	1993 Germany
Bronze medal – third place	1995 Greece

Stojan "Stojko" Vranković (born 22 January 1964) is a Croatian basketball executive and former professional player. He served as the president of the Croatian Basketball Federation from 2016 to 2022.

A 7 ft 2 in (2.18 m) center, he played five seasons (1990–1992; 1996–1999) in the National Basketball Association (NBA), as a member of the Boston Celtics, Minnesota Timberwolves, and Los Angeles Clippers. He was popular in Europe while playing for the Athens-based club Panathinaikos, with whom he won the club's first EuroLeague championship.

== Club career ==
A renowned shot blocker, Vranković made little impact in the NBA, managing small minutes and a low scoring average even though he started 73 out of 170 games played. He did however have a major impact in Europe playing for the Greek League team Panathinaikos. For a short spell in the winter of 1994–95, Vrankovic thrilled fans of the Greek team by adding 3-point shots to his usual repertoire of slam dunks, hook shots, and blocked shots. One game, against Benfica in the EuroLeague in February 1995, exemplified this, as Vrankovic top-scored with 23 points and finished the game with a 3-point shot followed by a coast-to-coast dunk. Vrankovic had first taken a 3-point shot in the Greek League All-Star Game held at the Peace and Friendship Stadium in Piraeus in December 1994, and seemed as surprised as everyone in the stadium when it went in. In 1996, he combined with Dominique Wilkins to lead Panathinaikos to a EuroLeague championship - a first for the club. Vranković's defensive contribution was vital, namely his block of Željko Rebrača at the buzzer, in the third game of the quarter-finals against Benetton Treviso, sending Panathinaikos through. In the EuroLeague Finals, his block to deny Barcelona the lead in the last second gave the game a dramatic end, but he fell to the ground in the ensuing commotion and clutched his knee in pain at the buzzer. In an interview at the official EuroLeague Final Four website, Panathinaikos captain Panagiotis Giannakis described the incident as follows:

"All that happened at the end of the game is unbelievable, a few seconds that lasted one century! I remember Stojko [Vranković] running like...Carl Lewis from one side to the other, to stop (José Antonio) Montero. He blocked the layup, almost at the buzzer, and he sealed the victory."

== National team career ==
=== Yugoslavia ===
Vranković earned a silver medal at the 1988 Seoul Summer Olympic Games with the senior Yugoslav national team.

=== Croatia ===
At the following 1992 Barcelona Summer Olympic Games, he got the silver medal after Croatia lost to the USA in the men's final against "The Dream Team", while playing for the senior Croatian national team.

== Administrative career ==
=== Croatian Basketball Federation president (2016–2022) ===
On November 19, 2016, Vranković became the president of the Croatian Basketball Federation (HKS). On June 15, 2019, he was re-elected as the HKS president until 2023. On September 12, 2022, after a poor performance of the Croatia men's national basketball team at the EuroBasket 2022, Vranković resigned form his position.

== Personal life ==
Vranković was a close friend of the fellow Croatian basketball player Dražen Petrović. He was a coffin bearer at Petrović's funeral in 1993, and has been active in commemorating his memory. In an article at the FIBA website concerning the opening of a museum in Dražen's honour, Vranković was quoted as saying: "I would like to thank all those involved in creating this place, so children would be able to learn more about basketball's Amadeus". Vranković and his wife Lovorka have two daughters, Andrea and Matea, and one son, Antonio, who plays for Croatian club Split.
