= Ivan Šuker =

Croatian politician and economist (1957–2023)

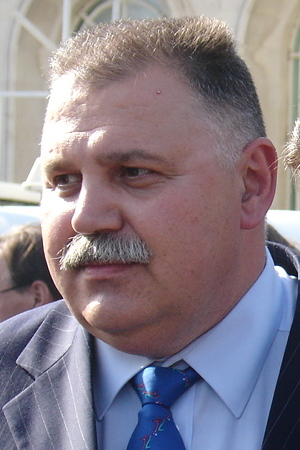

President of the Croatian Basketball Federation
- In office June 2015 – October 2016
- Preceded by: Danko Radić
- Succeeded by: Stojko Vranković
- In office 2002–2004
- Preceded by: Ivo Vidović
- Succeeded by: Danko Radić

Deputy Prime Minister of Croatia
- In office 19 November 2009 – 29 December 2010
- Prime Minister: Jadranka Kosor
- Preceded by: Damir Polančec
- Succeeded by: Petar Čobanković

Minister of Finance
- In office 23 December 2003 – 29 December 2010
- Prime Minister: Ivo Sanader; Jadranka Kosor
- Preceded by: Mato Crkvenac
- Succeeded by: Martina Dalić

Personal details
- Born: 12 November 1957 Gornji Rujani, PR Bosnia and Herzegovina, FPR Yugoslavia
- Died: 5 September 2023 (aged 65) Zagreb, Croatia
- Party: Croatian Democratic Union
- Education: University of Zagreb

Ivan Šuker (Croatian pronunciation: [ǐvan ʃǔker]; 12 November 1957 – 5 September 2023) was a Croatian politician and economist. He served as Minister of Finance from 2003 to 2010, as a member of the Croatian Democratic Union.

Šuker served as the president of the Croatian Basketball Federation for two terms, from 2002 to 2004 and from 2015 to 2016, when he was replaced by the famous Croatian basketball player Stojko Vranković.

== Early life and education ==
Šuker was born in Gornji Rujani near the village of Lištani, Livno municipality, Bosnia and Herzegovina. He graduated from the Faculty of Economics and Business of the University of Zagreb in 1983.

== Professional life ==
- 2010–20??, member of Croatian Parliament
- 2003–2010, Minister of Finance of Republic of Croatia
- 2000–2003, member of Croatian Parliament's Finances and Budget Board
- 2000–2003, Mayor of Velika Gorica
- 1997–2000, Zagreb County Deputy Ruler
- 1990–2000, Head of the Local Tax Office Velika Gorica
- 1986–1990, Finance Director in Velika Gorica
- 1984–1986, Chief Accountant of the Budget Department of Velika Gorica Municipality

== Political career ==
- 2009–2010, elected as Vice Prime Minister of the Government of the Republic of Croatia
- 2003–2010, Minister of Finance of Republic of Croatia
- 2002, at the 7th General Convention of the Croatian Democratic Union (HDZ), elected as a Deputy Chairman of the Party
- 2000–2003, Mayor of Velika Gorica
- 2000–2013, President of Velika Gorica Town Board of the Croatian Democratic Union (HDZ)
- 2000, at the 5th General Convention of the Croatian Democratic Union (HDZ), elected as a member of the Party Presidency
- 2000, in the January elections, elected as a member of the Croatian Parliament, member of the Finance and Central Budget Committee, member of the Local and Regional Self-government Committee
- 1997–2000, Zagreb County Deputy Ruler
- 1993–1997, External member of the Zagreb City Government
- 1991–1992, President of the Velika Gorica Crisis Headquarters during Croatian War of Independence
- 1990–1991, Member of the Executive Council of the Velika Gorica Municipality Assembly

== Sports career ==
2002–2004, 2015–2016, President of the Croatian Basketball Federation
20??–20??, President of KK Gorica

== Personal life and death ==
Šuker spoke English fluently. His favorite hobby was basketball, and for several years he served as chairman of Croatian Basketball Association. Šuker and famous football player Davor Šuker were paternal cousins.

Ivan Šuker died in Zagreb on 5 September 2023, at the age of 65.
