= Tomislav Ružić =

Croatian basketball player and coach

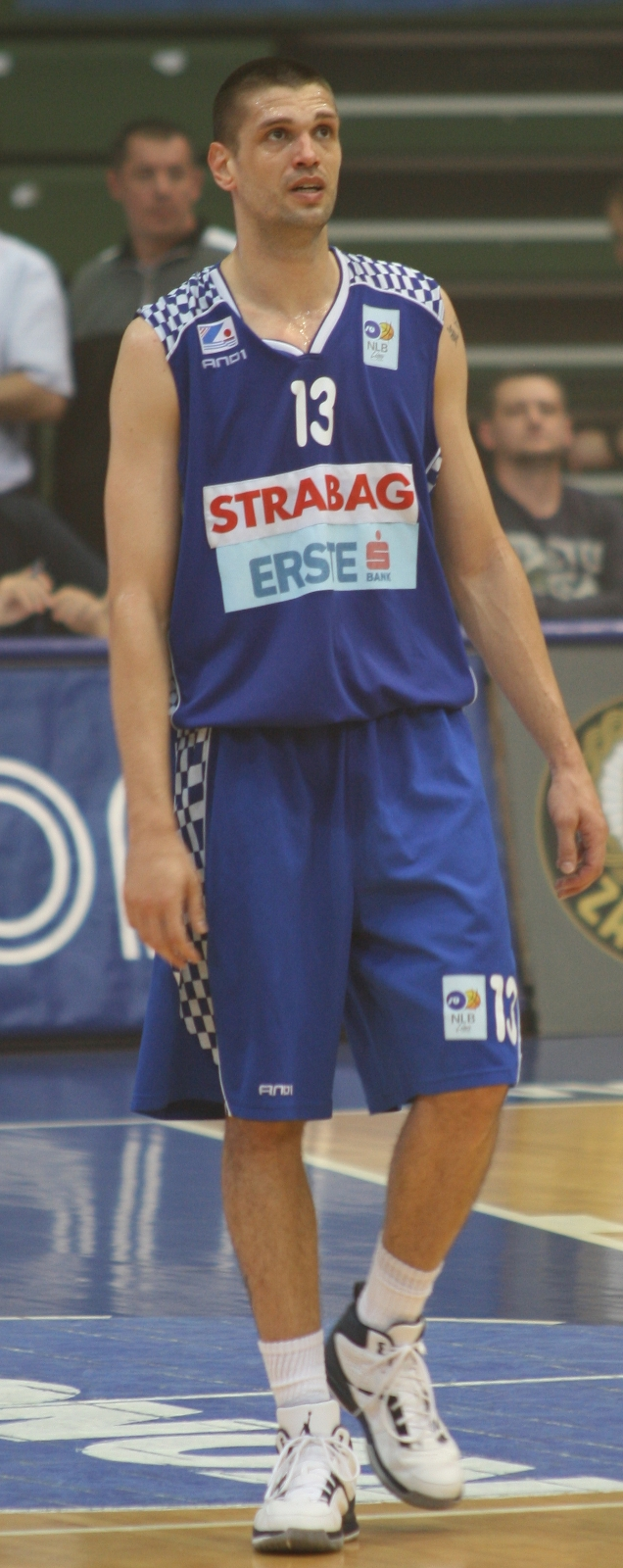
- Ružić playing for Zadar in 2010

Zadar
- Title: Assistant coach
- League: ABA League; Croatian League

Personal information
- Born: July 2, 1979 (age 47) Zadar, SR Croatia, SFR Yugoslavia
- Listed height: 6 ft 10 in (2.08 m)

Career information
- NBA draft: 2001: undrafted
- Playing career: 1996–2017
- Position: Center
- Coaching career: 2019–present

Career history

Playing
- 1996–2002: Zadar
- 2002–2003: Cibona
- 2003–2004: Beşiktaş
- 2004–2006: ASVEL
- 2006–2007: Besançon BCD
- 2007–2008: Kepez Belediyesi
- 2008–2010: Zadar
- 2010–2013: Tofaş
- 2013–2014: Beşiktaş
- 2014–2017: Gaziantep

Coaching
- 2019–2020: Zadar (assistant)
- 2022–present: Zadar (assistant)

Career highlights
- As player: 2× Croatian Cup (1998, 2000); As assistant coach: Croatian Cup (2020)

Tomislav Ružić (born July 2, 1979) is a Croatian professional basketball coach and former player.

== Personal life ==
Ružić is married to the former Croatian international volleyball player, Barbara Jelić-Ružić. When Tomislav joined Beşiktaş in 2003, his wife Barbara had also joined a Turkish team, Eczacıbaşı.

Ružić has also acquired Turkish citizenship and played as a domestic player in Turkish League.
