= Danko Radić =

Croatian basketball referee, executive and coach

President of the Croatian Basketball Federation
- In office 2004 – 21 June 2015
- Preceded by: Ivan Šuker
- Succeeded by: Ivan Šuker

Personal details
- Born: 30 October 1952 Podorljak, PR Croatia, FPR Yugoslavia
- Died: 12 February 2018 (aged 65) Zagreb, Croatia
- Resting place: Kvanj Cemetery, Šibenik, Croatia
- Spouse: Zlatka Radić
- Children: 2
- Occupation: Basketball executive; basketball referee; basketball coach

Danko Radić (30 October 1952 – 12 February 2018) was a Croatian professional basketball referee, executive and coach who served as the president of the Croatian Basketball Federation from 2004 to 2015.

== Biography ==
Radić was born in the village of Podorljak based in Šibenik-Knin County. As a founder of the famous Croatian female basketball club, ŽKK Šibenik, he has worked many years as a women's basketball coach and later became a basketball referee. At first, he worked as a referee in the Yugoslav Second Basketball League, and later in the Yugoslav First Basketball League, FIBA World Cup, FIBA Eurobasket, Olympic Games, and the Mediterranean Games.

In 2004 Radić was named the president of the Croatian Basketball Federation. On 21 June 2015, he was replaced by Croatian economist, politician and deputy prime minister in the second cabinet of prime minister Sanader, Ivan Šuker.

He died on 12 February 2018 in Zagreb, after a battle with long illness.
