= Sandro Nicević =

Croatian basketball player

- Nicević with Beşiktaş.

Personal information
- Born: 16 June 1976 (age 50) Pula, SR Croatia, SFR Yugoslavia
- Listed height: 6 ft 11 in (2.11 m)
- Listed weight: 235 lb (107 kg)

Career information
- Playing career: 1994–2017
- Position: Center

Career history
- 1994–1995: Gradine Pula
- 1995–1996: Franck Zagreb
- 1996–1997: Benston Zagreb
- 1997–2001: Cibona Zagreb
- 2001: Olimpija Ljubljana
- 2001–2004: Le Mans
- 2004–2005: AEK Athens
- 2005–2006: Unicaja Málaga
- 2006–2007: Le Mans
- 2007–2008: Beşiktaş
- 2008–2011: Benetton Basket
- 2011–2012: Sutor Montegranaro
- 2013: Treviso Basket
- 2013: Cibona Zagreb
- 2013–2017: Orlandina Basket

Career highlights
- All-EuroCup Team (2009); Spanish League champion (2006); Greek League All-Star (2005); French Cup winner (2004); 5× Croatian League champion (1998–2001, 2013); 3× Croatian Cup winner (1999, 2001, 2013); 2x Croatian All-Star (1996, 2000)
Medals
Men's basketball
Representing Croatia
European U-18 Championship
Silver medal – second place	1994 Israel	U-18 Team

Sandro Nicević (born 16 June 1976 in Pula, SR Croatia, SFR Yugoslavia) is a retired Croatian professional basketball player, who last played for Orlandina Basket in the Italian Serie A.

== Professional career ==
Nicević started playing basketball at his hometown club Gradine Pula. Soon he attracted interest of Croatian powerhouse Cibona Zagreb. After two seasons at Cibona's feeder teams Franck and Benston, Nicević joined Cibona's first squad and become crucial team member. In 2001 Nicević left Cibona starting his tour all around Europe, playing in Slovenia (Olimpija), France (Le Mans), Greece (AEK), Spain (Málaga), Turkey (Beşiktaş) and Italy (Treviso and Montegranaro).

After initially retiring in 2012, Nicević reactivated his career to help his former clubs. First in January 2013 he played one promotion game for Treviso, his former club that went to lower Italian league after main sponsor Benetton family withdrew from it. In February 2013 it was revealed that Nicević signed for Cibona, his former club facing financial troubles. In his first game with Cibona he scored a buzzer beater in Croatian Cup final against Cedevita.

In July 2013 Nicević accepted offer from Italian second division side Orlandina Basket.

== National team career ==
Nicević was a member of the Croatian national basketball team. He played at the 1997 EuroBasket, the 2003 EuroBasket, the 2008 Summer Olympics, and the 2009 EuroBasket.
