= Pankracije Barać =

Croatian basketball player

Personal information
- Born: November 4, 1981 (age 45) Pula, SR Croatia, SFR Yugoslavia
- Listed height: 1.96 m (6 ft 5 in)

Career information
- NBA draft: 2003: undrafted
- Playing career: 1999–2017
- Position: Point guard / shooting guard

Career history
- 1999–2000: Zrinjevac
- 2000–2003: Hiron
- 2003–2008: Zadar
- 2008–2009: Spirou Charleroi
- 2009–2010: Zagreb
- 2011: Cibona
- 2011: Jazine
- 2011–2012: BC Kyiv
- 2012: Svjetlost Slavonski Brod
- 2012–2014: CSU Asesoft Ploiești
- 2014–2016: Steaua București
- 2016–2017: Jazine
- 2017: BBC Monthey

Career highlights
- 2× Croatian League (2005, 2008); Belgian League (2009); Swiss League (2017); 4× Croatian Cup (2005–2007, 2010); Belgian Cup (2009); Croatian All-Star Game MVP (2008)

Pankracije Barać (born November 4, 1981) is a Croatian former professional basketball player. He played at the guard positions.
