= Julius Johnson =

American basketball player

Julius (Juby) Johnson
Personal information
- Born: November 8, 1981 (age 45) Cleveland, Ohio, U.S.
- Listed height: 6 ft 6 in (1.98 m)
- Listed weight: 205 lb (93 kg)

Career information
- High school: Garfield Heights (Cleveland Ohio)
- College: Miami (Ohio) (2000–2004)
- NBA draft: 2004: undrafted
- Playing career: 2004–2014
- Position: Shooting guard
- Number: 32

Career history
- 2004–2009: Zadar
- 2010–2014: BCM Gravelines

Career highlights
- 2× Croatian League champion (2005, 2008); 3× Croatian Cup winner (2005, 2006, 2007); 2× Leaders Cup winner (2011, 2013)

Julius James Johnson (born November 8, 1981) is an American former professional basketball player. He played for Zadar and BCM Gravelines. He now coaches with Gregory Sesny for the Collegiate Middle School Basketball program.
