= Nikola Prkačin =

Croatian basketball player (born 1975)

Nikša Prkačin
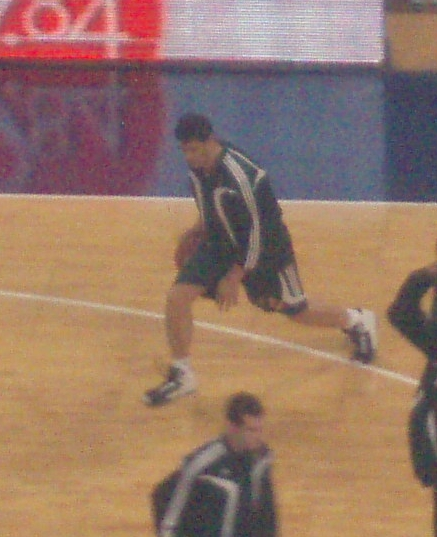

Personal information
- Born: 15 November 1975 (age 50) Dubrovnik, SR Croatia, SFR Yugoslavia
- Listed height: 6 ft 10 in (2.08 m)
- Listed weight: 245 lb (111 kg)

Career information
- NBA draft: 1997: undrafted
- Playing career: 1993–2010
- Position: Center / power forward
- Coaching career: 2012–present

Career history

Playing
- 1993–1998: Split
- 1998–2003: Cibona
- 2003–2007: Efes Pilsen
- 2007–2008: Dynamo Moscow
- 2008: Panathinaikos
- 2008–2009: Cibona
- 2009–2010: Zagreb

Coaching
- 2012–2014: Croatia (assistant)

Career highlights
- Croatian Premier League MVP (2002)

Nikola "Nikša" Prkačin (born 15 November 1975) is a Croatian retired professional basketball player and coach. At a height of 2.08 m (6 ft 10 in) tall, he played at the power forward and center positions. During his professional club playing career, Prkačin won seven European national domestic league championships, nine European national domestic cup titles, and one European national domestic super cup title, in 16 seasons.

== Early years and career ==
Prkačin started his basketball club career in his hometown of Dubrovnik, where he played with the local team of Pomorac.

== Professional career ==
=== Split Croatia ===
In 1993, at the age of 18, Prkačin moved to the Croatian Premier League club Split Croatia, where he played for the next five seasons. Prkačin established himself as the successor to Split's famous center Dino Rađja, and during his time with the club, he also gained significant experience and knowledge. After a few seasons, he became one of the team's key players. With Split, he won two Croatian Cup titles.

=== Cibona Zagreb ===
Prior to the 1998–99 season, Prkačin moved to the then Croatian Premier League champions Cibona Zagreb, where he resided for the next five seasons. With Cibona, he won five Croatian Premier League championships and four Croatian Cup titles. He also won the EuroLeague's Opening Tournament in 2001. He was named the Croatian Premier League's Most Valuable Player in 2002. While with Cibona Zagreb, some his teammates included: Slaven Rimac, Zoran Planinić, Josip Sesar, Dino Rađja, and Chucky Atkins

=== Efes Istanbul ===
After spending a decade building up his career in the Croatian Premier League, Prkačin finally signed a contract with a foreign club. In 2003, he signed with the Turkish Super League club Efes Istanbul. Prkačin established himself in the club, as he played on a regular basis, as the club's forward-center. He played four seasons with Efes.

With Efes, he won two Turkish Super League championships, and two Turkish Cup titles.

=== Dynamo Moscow ===
In 2007, Prkačin joined the Russian Super League club Dynamo Moscow. He played the club during the 2007–08 season. He left the club before the season ended, in January 2008.

=== Panathinaikos Athens ===
In January 2008, during the second half of the 2007–08 season, Prkačin joined the Greek League club Panathinaikos Athens. With Panathinaikos, he won the Greek League championship and the Greek Cup title.

=== Return to Cibona Zagreb ===
Prior to the 2008–09 season, Prkačin moved back to Croatia, as he signed a €400,000 net income annual contract with Cibona Zagreb.

=== Zagreb ===
In 2009, Prkačin joined the Croatian club Zagreb. He finished his basketball club playing career with Zagreb in 2010.

== National team career ==
Prkačin was a member of the Croatian Under-22 junior national team. His debut at a major tournament with the senior Croatian national team's selection came at the 1997 EuroBasket. After that, he played with Croatia at the following major FIBA tournaments: the 1999 EuroBasket, the 2001 EuroBasket, the 2003 EuroBasket, the 2005 EuroBasket, and the 2007 EuroBasket, He also represented Croatia at the 2008 Summer Olympics and the 2009 EuroBasket. Prkačin was Croatia's team captain twice.

== Coaching career ==
After he retired from playing professional club basketball, Prkačin began working as a basketball coach. From 2012 to 2014, he was an assistant coach with the senior men's Croatian national team.

== Player profile ==
Prkačin mainly played at the center position, although he also played as a power forward. Prkačin was known for his pick and roll play, precise hook shot, and mid-range jump shot. Although he was shorter in height compared to most other European centers of his era, Prkačin compensated for that with his immense strength and body balance. It was a rarity to see Prkačin attempt a three point field goal.

== Career trajectory ==
Season	Club	Domestic League	Domestic Cup	Continental Cup	(Croatia) Croatian NT
1993–94	Split Croatia		Croatian Cup Winner		Croatia Under-22
1994–95	Split Croatia				Croatia Under-22
1995–96	Split Croatia				Croatia Under-22
1996–97	Split Croatia		Croatian Cup winner		Croatia; 1997 EuroBasket: 11th place
1997–98	Split Croatia				
1998–99	(Croatia) Cibona Zagreb	Croatian Premier League Champion	Croatian Cup Winner		1999 EuroBasket: 11th place
1999–00	(Croatia) Cibona Zagreb	Croatian Premier League Champion			
2000–01	(Croatia) Cibona Zagreb	Croatian Premier League Champion	Croatian Cup Winner	EuroLeague Top 16 Stage	2001 EuroBasket: 7th place
2001–02	(Croatia) Cibona Zagreb	Croatian Premier League Champion; Croatian Premier League MVP	Croatian Cup Winner	EuroLeague Opening Tournament winner EuroLeague Group Stage	
2002–03	(Croatia) Cibona Zagreb			EuroLeague Top 16 Stage	2003 EuroBasket: 11th place
2003–04	(Turkey) Efes Istanbul	Turkish Super League Champion	Turkish Cup Finalist; Turkish Super Cup Finalist	EuroLeague Top 16 Stage	
2004–05	(Turkey) Efes Istanbul	Turkish Super League Champion	Turkish Super Cup Finalist	EuroLeague Quarterfinalist	2005 EuroBasket: 7th place
2005–06	(Turkey) Efes Istanbul	Turkish Super League Finalist	Turkish Cup Winner; Turkish Super Cup Finalist	EuroLeague Quarterfinalist	
2006–07	(Turkey) Efes Istanbul	Turkish Super League Finalist	Turkish Cup Winner; Turkish Super Cup Winner	EuroLeague Top 16 Stage	2007 EuroBasket: 6th place
2007–08	(Russia) Dynamo Moscow				
2007–08	(Greece) Panathinaikos Athens	Greek League Champion	Greek Cup Winner	EuroLeague Top 16 Stage	Summer Olympics: 6th place
2008–09	(Croatia) Cibona Zagreb		Croatian Cup Winner	EuroLeague Top 16 Stage; Adriatic League Final Four	Croatia; 2009 EuroBasket: 6th place
2009–10	(Croatia) Zagreb		Croatian Cup Winner	EuroChallenge Quarterfinalist	

== Personal life ==
Prkačin resides in Zagreb, Croatia, with his wife and five children, one of whom is Roko Prkačin, who is also a professional basketball player. In his free time, he enjoys fishing and playing water polo.
