= Krešimir Ćosić Cup =

National basketball cup of Croatia

Krešimir Ćosić Cup Kup Krešimira Ćosića
- Sport: Basketball
- Founded: 1991; 35 years ago
- Country: Croatia
- Continent: (European Union) FIBA Europe (Europe)
- Most recent champion: Split (7th title)
- Most titles: Cibona, Zadar (9 titles)
- Broadcasters: Arena Sport; Sportska TV
- Website: hks-cbf.hr

The Krešimir Ćosić Cup, or Croatian Basketball Cup, is the national basketball cup of Croatia. It is named after the Croatian basketball player Krešimir Ćosić. The cup has been contested since 1992.

== Title holders ==
- 1991–92: Split (Slobodna Dalmacija)
- 1992–93: Split (Slobodna Dalmacija)
- 1993–94: Split (Croatia Osiguranje)
- 1994–95: Cibona
- 1995–96: Cibona
- 1996–97: Split (Croatia Osiguranje)
- 1997–98: Zadar
- 1998–99: Cibona
- 1999–00: Zadar
- 2000–01: Cibona
- 2001–02: Cibona (Cibona VIP)
- 2002–03: Zadar
- 2003–04: Split (Split Croatia Osiguranje)
- 2004–05: Zadar
- 2005–06: Zadar
- 2006–07: Zadar
- 2007–08: Zagreb (Zagreb Croatia Osiguranje)
- 2008–09: Cibona (Cibona VIP)
- 2009–10: Zagreb (Zagreb Croatia Osiguranje)
- 2010–11: Zagreb (Zagreb Croatia Osiguranje)
- 2011–12: Cedevita
- 2012–13: Cibona
- 2013–14: Cedevita
- 2014–15: Cedevita
- 2015–16: Cedevita
- 2016–17: Cedevita
- 2017–18: Cedevita
- 2018–19: Cedevita
- 2019–20: Zadar
- 2020–21: Zadar
- 2021–22: Cibona
- 2022–23: Cibona
- 2023–24: Zadar
- 2024–25: Split
- 2025–26: Split

== The finals ==
Season	Champions	Score	Runners-up	Venue	Location	MVP
(Croatia) Krešimir Ćosić Cup
1991–92	Split (Slobodna Dalmacija) (1, 1-0)	88–85	Cibona (1, 0-1)	Dvorana Mladosti	Rijeka	(Croatia) Žan Tabak
1992–93	Split (Slobodna Dalmacija) (2, 2-0)	75–64	Zadar (1, 0-1)	Dom sportova Mate Parlov	Pula	(Croatia) Aramis Naglić
1993–94	Split (Croatia Osiguranje) (3, 3-0)	86–76	Cibona (2, 0-2)	Zrinjevac Sport Hall	Osijek	(United States) Steve Colter
1994–95	Cibona (3, 1-2)	91–75	Zrinjevac (1, 0-1)	Športska dvorana Gospino polje	Dubrovnik	(United States) Gerrod Abram
1995–96	Cibona (4, 2-2)	68–64	Split (Croatia Osiguranje) (4, 3-1)	Dvorana Mladosti (2)	Rijeka (2)	(Croatia) Ivica Žurić
1996–97	Split (Croatia Osiguranje) (5, 4-1)	72–67	Cibona (5, 2-3)	Dražen Petrović Basketball Hall	Zagreb	(Croatia) Ante Grgurević
1997–98	Zadar (2, 1-1)	82–70	Zagreb (1, 0-1)	Jazine Basketball Hall	Zadar	(Croatia) Emilio Kovačić
1998–99	Cibona (Cibona VIP) (6, 3-3)	70–69	Split (6, 4-2)	Arena Gripe	Split	(United States) Chucky Atkins
1999–00	Zadar (3, 2-1)	71–62	Cibona (Cibona VIP) (7, 3-4)	Dražen Petrović Basketball Hall (2)	Zagreb (2)	(Croatia) Dino Rađa
2000–01	Cibona (Cibona VIP) (8, 4-4)	73–59	Zadar (4, 2-2)	Dražen Petrović Basketball Hall (3)	Zagreb (3)	(Croatia) Gordan Giriček
2001–02	Cibona (Cibona VIP) (9, 5-4)	88–84	Zadar (5, 2-3)	Dražen Petrović Basketball Hall (4)	Zagreb (4)	(Croatia) Nikola Prkačin
2002–03	Zadar (6, 3-3)	72–59	Cibona (Cibona VIP) (10, 5-5)	Arena Gripe (2)	Split (2)	(Croatia) Marko Popović
2003–04	Split (Split Croatia Osiguranje) (7, 5-2)	74–72	Zadar (7, 3-4)	Jazine Basketball Hall (2)	Zadar (2)	(Croatia) Damir Rančić
2004–05	Zadar (8, 4-4)	94–89	Cibona (Cibona VIP) (11, 5-6)	Jazine Basketball Hall (3)	Zadar (3)	
2005–06	Zadar (9, 5-4)	84–69	Zagreb (2, 0-2)	Mladost Hall	Karlovac	
2006–07	Zadar (10, 6-4)	90–83	Zagreb (3, 0-3)	Jazine Basketball Hall (4)	Zadar (4)	
2007–08	Zagreb (Zagreb Croatia Osiguranje) (4, 1-3)	75–73	Cibona (Cibona VIP) (12, 5-7)	ŠD Trnsko	Zagreb (5)	
2008–09	Cibona (Cibona VIP) (13, 6-7)	73–63	Zagreb (Zagreb Croatia Osiguranje) (5, 1-4)	Krešimir Ćosić Hall	Zadar (5)	
2009–10	Zagreb (Zagreb Croatia Osiguranje) (6, 2-4)	81–74	Cibona (Cibona VIP) (14, 6-8)	ŠD Trnsko (2)	Zagreb (6)	(Croatia) Damir Mulaomerović
2010–11	Zagreb (Zagreb Croatia Osiguranje) (7, 3-4)	91–85	Zadar (11, 6-5)	Dražen Petrović Basketball Hall (5)	Zagreb (7)	(Croatia) Mario Kasun
2011–12	Cedevita (1, 1-0)	74–72	Zagreb (8, 3-5)	ŠD Trnsko (3)	Zagreb (8)	(Slovenia) Matjaž Smodiš
2012–13	Cibona (15, 7-8)	77–76	Cedevita (2, 1-1)	Dražen Petrović Basketball Hall (6)	Zagreb (9)	
2013–14	Cedevita (3, 2-1)	86–68	Zagreb (9, 3-6)	Dom Sportova	Zagreb (10)	
2014–15	Cedevita (4, 3-1)	86–82	Zadar (12, 6-6)	ŠD Borovo naselje	Vukovar	
2015–16	Cedevita (5, 4-1)	74–70	Zadar (13, 6-7)	Krešimir Ćosić Hall (2)	Zadar (6)	
2016–17	Cedevita (6, 5-1)	102–66	Jolly Jadranska Banka Šibenik (1, 0-1)	Sportska dvorana Baldekin	Šibenik	(Croatia) Miro Bilan
2017–18	Cedevita (7, 6-1)	86–74	Cibona (16, 7-9)	Krešimir Ćosić Hall (3)	Zadar (7)	(United States) Will Cherry
2018–19	Cedevita (8, 7-1)	89–74	Cibona (17, 7-10)	Arena Gripe (3)	Split (3)	(Croatia) Filip Krušlin
2019–20	Zadar (14, 7-7)	89–76	Cibona (18, 7-11)	Krešimir Ćosić Hall (4)	Zadar (8)	(Croatia) Dominik Mavra
2020–21	Zadar (15, 8-7)	79–70	Split (8, 5–3)	Ribnjak Sports Hall	Omiš	(United States) Chinanu Onuaku
2021–22	Cibona (19, 8–11)	67–65	Cedevita Junior (1, 0–1)	Centar Zamet	Rijeka (3)	(Croatia) Danko Branković
2022–23	Cibona (20, 9–11)	86–66	Cedevita Junior (2, 0–2)	Dražen Petrović Basketball Hall (7)	Zagreb (11)	(Croatia) Borna Kapusta
2023–24	Zadar (16, 9–7)	80–68	Cibona (21, 9–12)	Arena Gripe (4)	Split (4)	(Croatia) Luka Božić (Note: Božić scored 27 pts, 10 reb, 10 ass against Cibona making him the first player to achieve a triple-double in the final game.)
2024–25	Split (9, 6–3)	77–60	Alkar (1, 0–1)	Sportska dvorana Zabok	Zabok	(Croatia) David Škara
2025–26	Split (10, 7–3)	89–86	Zadar (17, 9–8)	Dražen Petrović Basketball Hall (8)	Zagreb (12)	(Croatia) Antonio Sikirić

== Performance by club ==
Rank	Club	Titles	Runners-up	Champions
1	Cibona	9	12	1995, 1996, 1999, 2001, 2002, 2009, 2013, 2022, 2023
2	Zadar	9	8	1998, 2000, 2003, 2005, 2006, 2007, 2020, 2021, 2024
3	Split	7	3	1992, 1993, 1994, 1997, 2004, 2025, 2026
4	Cedevita	7	1	2012, 2014, 2015, 2016, 2017, 2018, 2019
5	Zagreb	3	6	2008, 2010, 2011
6	Cedevita Junior	0	2	
7	Zrinjevac	0	1	
8	Jolly Šibenik	0	1	
9	Alkar	0	1	

== Croatian Basketball Cup Final Four top scorers ==
Season	Top Scorer	Club	Points Scored
1991–92	(Croatia) Velimir Perasović	Slobodna Dalmacija	51
1992–93	(Croatia) Zdravko Radulović	Cibona	46
1993–94	(United States) Steve Colter	Croatia Osiguranje	49
1994–95	(Croatia) Mario Gašparović	Cibona	44
1996–97	(Croatia) Petar Maleš	Zrinjevac	44
1997–98	(Croatia) Emilio Kovačić	Zadar	46
1998–99	(United States) Mark Miller	Split	44
1999–00	(Croatia) Dino Rađa	Zadar	58
2000–01	(Croatia) Matej Mamić	Cibona	36
2001–02	(Croatia) Josip Sesar	Cibona	41
2002–03	(Croatia) Marko Popović	Zadar	35
2003–04	(Croatia) Emilio Kovačić (Croatia) Damir Rančić	Zadar; Split	35
2004–05			
2005–06			
2006–07			
2007–08			
2008–09			
2009–10			
2010–11	(Croatia) Mario Kasun	Zagreb CO	
2011–12	(Slovenia) Matjaž Smodiš	Cedevita	
2012–13	(United States) Bracey Wright	Cedevita	36
2013–14	(Bosnia and Herzegovina) Miralem Halilović	Zagreb	32
2014–15	(United States) James Florence	Zadar	54
2015–16	(Croatia) Ante Delaš	Zadar	33
2016–17			
2017–18			
2018–19			
2019–20			
2020–21			
2021–22	(Croatia) Filip Bundović	Cedevita Junior	27
2022–22	(Croatia) Borna Kapusta	Cibona	44
2023–24	(Croatia) Luka Božić	Zadar	61
2024–25	(Croatia) David Škara	Split	32
2025–26	(Croatia) Antonio Jordano (United States) Teyvon Myers	Split	34

== Players with 3 or more trophies ==
Cups	Player
7	(Croatia) Nikola Prkačin
6	(Croatia) Lovro Mazalin
6	(Croatia) Josip Vranković
6	(Croatia) Karlo Žganec
5	(Croatia) Marko Arapović
5	(Croatia) Miro Bilan
5	(Croatia) Toni Katić
5	(Croatia) Jakov Vladović
4	(Croatia) Luka Babić
4	(Croatia) Pankracije Barać
4	(Croatia) Davor Kus
4	(Croatia) Branimir Longin
4	(Croatia) Damir Mulaomerović
4	(Croatia) Ivan Ramljak
4	(Croatia) Damir Tvrdić
4	(Croatia) Luka Žorić
3	(Croatia) Petar Babić
3	(Croatia) Marko Banić
3	(Croatia) Filip Bašljan
3	(Croatia) Toni Dijan
3	(North Macedonia) Todor Gečevski
3	(United States) Julius Johnson
3	(Croatia) Antonio Jordano
3	(Croatia) Goran Kalamiza
3	(Croatia) Filip Krušlin
3	(Croatia) Jure Lalić
3	(Croatia) Davor Marcelić
3	(Bosnia and Herzegovina) Džanan Musa
3	(Croatia) Aramis Naglić
3	(Croatia) Sandro Nicević
3	(Croatia) Hrvoje Oršulić
3	(Croatia) Hrvoje Perinčić
3	(Croatia) Jurica Ružić
3	(Croatia) Krunoslav Simon
3	(Croatia) Marko Tomas
3	(Croatia) Roko Ukić
3	(Croatia) Nenad Videka
3	(Croatia) Domagoj Vuković
3	(Croatia) Tomislav Zubčić
3	(Croatia) Ivica Žurić

Source: Crošarka

== See also ==
- Premijer liga
