= Davor Marcelić =

Croatian basketball player

Personal information
- Born: 20 May 1969 (age 57) Zadar, SR Croatia, SFR Yugoslavia
- Listed height: 6 ft 6.74 in (2.00 m)

Career information
- College: Southern Utah (1987–1991)
- NBA draft: 1991: undrafted
- Playing career: 1991–2010
- Position: Small forward

Career history
- 1991–1992: Cibona
- 1992–1993: Maricom Miklavž
- 1993–2000: Cibona
- 2000–2002: Anwil Włocławek
- 2002: Fortitudo Bologna
- 2002–2003: ASVEL
- 2003–2004: Zadar
- 2004–2005: Pau-Orthez
- 2005–2006: Cibona
- 2007: Geoplin Slovan
- 2007–2010: Krka

Career highlights
- 8× Croatian League (1994–2000, 2006); Slovenian League (2010); 3× Croatian Cup (1995, 1996, 1999)

Davor Marcelić (born 20 May 1969) is a Croatian retired professional basketball player who last played for KK Krka.
