= Josip Sesar =

Croatian basketball player and coach

Cibona
- Title: Head coach
- League: ABA League; Croatian League

Personal information
- Born: 17 January 1978 (age 48) Mostar, SR Bosnia and Herzegovina, SFR Yugoslavia
- Listed height: 6 ft 6 in (1.98 m)
- Listed weight: 202 lb (92 kg)

Career information
- NBA draft: 2000: 2nd round, 47th overall pick
- Drafted by: Seattle SuperSonics
- Playing career: 1993–2009
- Position: Shooting guard
- Coaching career: 2010–present

Career history

Playing
- 1993–1999: Zagreb
- 1999–2002: Cibona
- 2002–2003: Split CO
- 2003–2005: Cibona
- 2005: Široki Hercegtisak
- 2005–2006: Zadar
- 2006–2008: Zagreb
- 2008–2009: Zrinjski Mostar

Coaching
- 2010–2011: Zrinjevac
- 2015–2016, 2017–2021: Gorica
- 2018–2019, 2022–2023: Croatia (assistant)
- 2022–present: Cibona
- 2023—2025: Croatia

Career highlights
- As player: 5× Croatian League champion (2000–2004); 2× Croatian Cup champion (2001, 2002); European U-18 Championship MVP (1996); As head coach: Croatian Cup winner (2023)
- Stats at Basketball Reference
Medals
Men's basketball
Representing Croatia
European U-18 Championship
| Gold medal – first place | 1996 France | U-18 Team |

Josip Sesar (born 17 January 1978) is a Croatian professional basketball coach and former player who is the head coach for Dinamo Zagreb of the Croatian League and Alpe Adria Cup.

== Playing career ==
Sesar started training basketball when he was ten. He was 182 cm tall at the time. In 1992 he left Zrinjski Mostar for Split. Since the youth coach did not consider him a prospect, his father took him to Zagreb. In 1993, he started his professional career there. After six successful seasons with Zagreb, in 1999, Sesar signed his second professional contract, namely with Cibona. At the 2000 NBA draft he was drafted by the Seattle SuperSonics and then traded to the Boston Celtics. However, he never played a game for the Celtics or any other NBA team, making him 1 of 8 players from the 2000 NBA Draft to never play in the league.

== National team career ==
Sesar was the MVP of the 1996 European Championship for junior men, held in France. He also participated in the 1995 World Championship for junior men.

He was part of senior Croatia national team selections at the 1997 EuroBasket, 1999 EuroBasket qualification and the 2001 EuroBasket.

== Coaching career ==
In July 2011, Sesar became a coach for the youth selections of Cibona. In July 2022, Cibona hired Sesar as their new head coach.
