= Emilio Kovačić =

Croatian professional basketball scout and former player

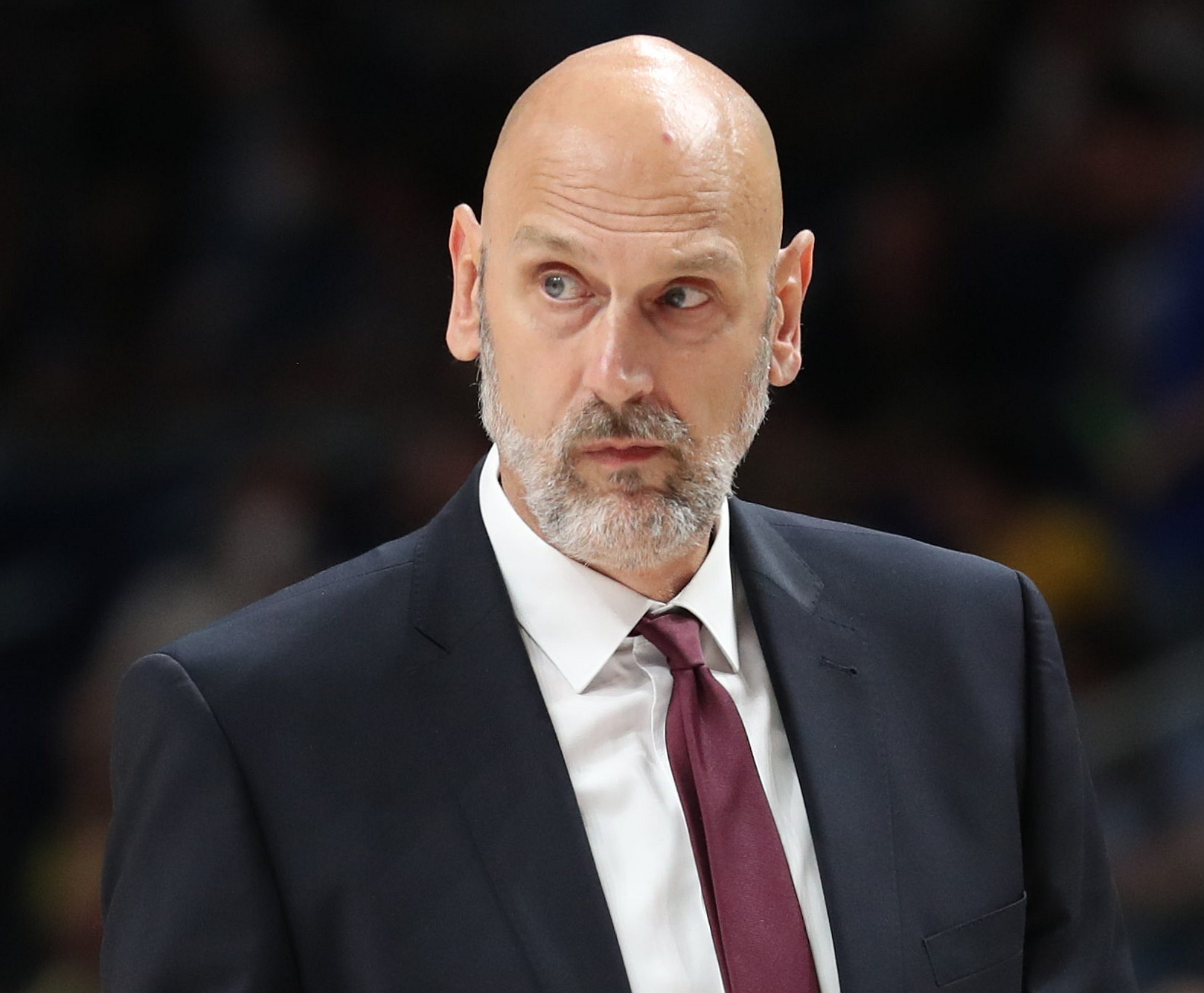

Personal information
- Born: 11 January 1968 (age 58) Zadar, SR Croatia, SFR Yugoslavia
- Listed height: 6 ft 10 in (2.08 m)

Career information
- College: Grand Canyon (1987–1988); Arizona State (1989–1990); Biola (1990–1992)
- NBA draft: 1992: undrafted
- Playing career: 1992–2004
- Position: Center

Career history
- 1992–1993: Zadar
- 1993–1994: Cibona
- 1994–1997: Zrinjevac
- 1997–1999: Zadar
- 1999–2001: Union Olimpija
- 2001–2003: Skipper Bologna
- 2003–2004: Zadar

Career highlights
- Croatian League champion (1994); Slovenian League champion (2001); Croatian Cup winner (1998); 2× Slovenian Cup winner (2000, 2001); Croatian Cup MVP (1998); Slovenian Cup MVP (2001); NAIA champion (1988)
Medals
Men's basketball
Representing Croatia
EuroBasket
Bronze medal – third place	1993 Germany	Croatia
Representing Yugoslavia
European Championship for Cadets
Gold medal – first place	1985 Bulgaria	Team

Emilio Kovačić (born 11 January 1968 in Zadar) is a Croatian professional basketball scout and former player. At a height of 2.08 m (6'10) tall, he was a center with great rebounding skills and decent defensive abilities. He played for many years in the EuroLeague.

== College career ==
Kovačić played American college basketball for the NAIA Grand Canyon Antelopes and Biola Eagles. He also played in the NCAA Division I team, the Arizona State Sun Devils.

== Professional career ==
In his pro career, Kovačić played with Zadar, Zrinjevac, Fortitudo Bologna, Union Olimpija, and Cibona. He was named the MVP of the Krešimir Ćosić Cup (Croatian Cup) of the 1997–98 season, while a member of Zadar. In 2001, Kovačić has named the MVP of the Slovenian Cup finals.

== National team career ==
Kovačić was a regular member of the senior men's Croatian national team. With Croatia, he won the bronze medal at the 1993 EuroBasket. He also played at the 1997 EuroBasket and at the 2001 EuroBasket.

== Post-playing career ==
Kovačić was hired in June 2013, as an international scouting consultant for the NBA's Phoenix Suns. After five seasons, Kovačić was relieved from his position with the Suns on 8 October 2018.
