= January 2008 in sports =

<<	January 2008					>>
Su	Mo	Tu	We	Th	Fr	Sa
		1	2	3	4	5
6	7	8	9	10	11	12
13	14	15	16	17	18	19
20	21	22	23	24	25	26
27	28	29	30	31
Sports

This list shows notable sports-related deaths, events, and notable outcomes that occurred in January 2008.

== Deaths ==
- 19: Don Wittman
- 18: Georgia Frontiere
- 14: Don Cardwell
- 13: Johnny Podres
- 11: Sir Edmund Hillary
- 10: Christopher Bowman
- 5: John Ashley

== Current sporting seasons ==
- American football
  - National Football League
- Auto racing 2008:
  - A1 Grand Prix
  - World Rally Championship
  - GP2 Asia Series
  - Rolex Sports Car
- Basketball 2008:
  - Australian National Basketball League
  - British Basketball League
  - EuroCup
  - Euroleague
  - National Basketball Association
  - Philippine Basketball Association
    - Philippine Cup
  - Russian Basketball Super League
  - Turkish Basketball League
  - ULEB Cup
- Cricket 2007:
  - England
- Cycling
  - UCI ProTour
- Football (soccer) 2007–08:
  - UEFA Champions League
  - UEFA Cup
  - England
  - Italy
  - Germany
  - Spain
  - France
  - Argentina
  - Denmark
- Golf 2008:
  - PGA Tour
  - European Tour
  - LPGA Tour
- Ice hockey 2007–08
  - National Hockey League
- Lacrosse 2008
  - National Lacrosse League
- Rugby union 2007–08:
  - IRB Sevens
  - Heineken Cup
  - English Premiership
  - Celtic League
  - Top 14

== 31 January 2008 (Thursday) ==
- Association football: 2008 Africa Cup of Nations:
  - Last day of the group stages.
  - Group D: Senegal 1 – 1 South Africa
  - Group D: Tunisia 0 – 0 Angola
    - Two drawn matches see Angola and Tunisia through to the quarter-finals.
- Basketball: Euroleague
  - The final berth in the Top 16 phase is secured by (Serbia) Partizan Belgrade when they defeat already-qualified (Turkey) Fenerbahçe 91–86 in Istanbul in Group C action. (Euroleague)

== 30 January 2008 (Wednesday) ==
- Association football: 2008 Africa Cup of Nations:
  - Group C: Cameroon 3 – 0 Sudan
  - Group C: Egypt 1 – 1 Zambia
    - Samuel Eto'o of Cameroon becomes the top-scoring player in Africa Cup of Nations history with his 15th goal, his penalty being the opening goal against Sudan. (BBC)
  - U.S. college:
    - In one of the biggest upsets of the year thus far, the Kansas State Wildcats defeated the previously undefeated #2 Kansas Jayhawks, 84–75 behind 20-point games from three different freshmen, including K-State star Michael Beasley who finished with 25 points (9-for-18 from the field). The win ends a 24-year streak of the Jayhawks winning at the Bramlage Coliseum, the Wildcats' home court. It also leaves Memphis as the lone unbeaten Division I team.

== 29 January 2008 (Tuesday) ==
- Association football: 2008 Africa Cup of Nations:
  - Group B: Nigeria 2 – 0 Benin
  - Group B: Ivory Coast 3 – 0 Mali
    - Nigeria finally manage to win a match, and leap-frog past Mali into the quarter-finals with Côte d'Ivoire, thereby saving coach Berti Vogts' job.

== 28 January 2008 (Monday) ==
- Association football: 2008 Africa Cup of Nations:
  - Group A: Ghana 2–0 Morocco
  - Group A: Guinea 1–1 Namibia
- Cricket:
  - Indian cricket team in Australia in 2007–08
    - 4th Test: India 526 (152.5 ov.) & 269/7 dec. (90 ov.) drew with Australia 563 (181 ov.)

== 27 January 2008 (Sunday) ==
- Association football: 2008 Africa Cup of Nations:
  - Group D: Senegal 1 – 3 Angola
  - Group D: Tunisia 3 – 1 South Africa
- Auto racing:
  - Rolex Sports Car season: 24 Hours of Daytona, at Daytona International Speedway, Florida, USA:
  (1) Juan Pablo Montoya (Colombia) , Dario Franchitti (United Kingdom) , Scott Pruett (United States) and Memo Rojas (Mexico) (2) Jon Fogarty (United States) , Alex Gurney (United States) , Jimmie Johnson (United States) and Jimmy Vasser (United States) (3) Ryan Briscoe (Australia) , Kurt Busch (United States) and Hélio Castroneves (Brazil)
  - 2008 World Rally Championship: Rallye Automobile de Monte-Carlo, at Monaco:
  (1) Sébastien Loeb (France) (2) Mikko Hirvonen (Finland) (3) Chris Atkinson (Australia)
- Cycling: UCI ProTour – Tour Down Under
  - 1: (Germany) André Greipel 2: (Australia) Allan Davis 3: (Spain) José Joaquín Rojas Gil
- Cyclo-cross: UCI Cyclo-cross World Championships:
  - Men: (gold) (Netherlands) Lars Boom, (silver) (Czech Republic) Zdeněk Štybar, (bronze) (Belgium) Sven Nys
  - Women: (gold) (Germany) Hanka Kupfernagel, (silver) (Netherlands) Marianne Vos, (bronze) (France) Laurence Leboucher
- Cricket:
  - Zimbabwean cricket team in Pakistan in 2007–08
    - 3rd ODI-Pakistan 272/9 (50 overs) beat Zimbabwe 235/7 (50 overs) by 37 runs
  - West Indian cricket team in South Africa in 2007–08
    - 3rd ODI-South Africa 256/3 (50 overs) beat West Indies 252/7 (48.4 overs) by 7 wickets
- Golf:
  - Tiger Woods wins the Buick Invitational in San Diego by eight strokes. The win is Woods' 62nd on the PGA Tour, matching Arnold Palmer for fourth on the list for most PGA Tour wins.
- Ice hockey:
  - NHL All-Star Game at Atlanta:
    - East 8–7 West, Eric Staal of the Carolina Hurricanes was named All-Star MVP.
- Tennis: 2008 Australian Open
  - Men's singles – Finals
    - (Serbia) Novak Djokovic [3] def. (France) Jo-Wilfried Tsonga, 4–6, 6–4, 6–3, 7–6^{2}

== 26 January 2008 (Saturday) ==
- Association football: 2008 Africa Cup of Nations:
  - Group C: Cameroon 5 – 1 Zambia
  - Group C: Egypt 3 – 0 Sudan
- Tennis: 2008 Australian Open
  - Women's singles – Finals
    - (Russia) Maria Sharapova [5] def. (Serbia) Ana Ivanovic [4], 7–5, 6–3

== 25 January 2008 (Friday) ==
- Association football: 2008 Africa Cup of Nations:
  - Group B: Ivory Coast 4 – 1 Benin
  - Group B: Nigeria 0 – 0 Mali
- Tennis: 2008 Australian Open
  - Men's singles – semi-finals
    - (Serbia) Novak Djokovic [3] def. (Switzerland) Roger Federer [1], 7–5, 6–3, 7–6^{5}

== 24 January 2008 (Thursday) ==
- Association football: 2008 Africa Cup of Nations:
  - Group A: Guinea 3 – 2 Morocco
  - Group A: Ghana 1 – 0 Namibia
- Tennis: 2008 Australian Open
  - Men's singles – semi-finals
    - (France) Jo-Wilfried Tsonga def. (Spain) Rafael Nadal [2], 6–2, 6–3, 6–2
  - Women's singles – semi-finals
    - (Serbia) Ana Ivanovic [4] def. (Slovakia) Daniela Hantuchová [9], 0–6, 6–3, 6–4
    - (Russia) Maria Sharpova [5] def. (Serbia) Jelena Janković [3], 6–3, 6–1

== 23 January 2008 (Wednesday) ==
- Association football: 2008 Africa Cup of Nations:
  - Group D: Tunisia 2 – 2 Senegal
  - Group D: South Africa 1 – 1 Angola
- Basketball:
  - Euroleague
    - Two clubs (in **bold**) secure spots in the Top 16 phase:
      - In Group C, (Italy) **Lottomatica Roma** defeat already-qualified (Spain) FC Barcelona 77–75 in Barcelona. This result, combined with the 100–87 home win of previously winless (France) Le Mans over (Croatia) Cibona in Group B, also sends idle (Turkey) **Fenerbahçe** through from Group C. (Euroleague)
  - U.S. college:
    - Sporting their first Top 25 ranking since 1969 (AP #25), Baylor defeats (#18) Texas A&M, 116–110 in the longest game in Big 12 history, going five overtimes. The Bears' Curtis Jerrells had 36 points in the win. Five Baylor players fouled out, while three Aggies played over 55 minutes, also a record.
- Tennis: 2008 Australian Open
  - Men's singles – quarter-finals
    - (Switzerland) Roger Federer [1] def. (United States) James Blake [12], 7–5, 7–6^{5}, 6–4
    - (Serbia) Novak Djokovic [3] def. (Spain) David Ferrer [5], 6–0, 6–3, 7–5
  - Women's singles – quarter-finals
    - (Serbia) Ana Ivanovic [4] def. (United States) Venus Williams [8], 7–6^{3}, 6–4
    - (Slovakia) Daniela Hantuchová [9] def. (Poland) Agnieszka Radwańska [29], 6–2, 6–2

== 22 January 2008 (Tuesday) ==
- Association football: 2008 Africa Cup of Nations:
  - Group C: Egypt 4 – 2 Cameroon
  - Group C: Sudan 0 – 3 Zambia
- Tennis: 2008 Australian Open
  - Men's singles – quarter-finals
    - (France) Jo-Wilfried Tsonga def. (Russia) Mikhail Youzhny [14], 7–5, 6–0, 7–6^{6}
    - (Spain) Rafael Nadal [2] def. (Finland) Jarkko Nieminen [24], 7–5, 6–3, 6–1
  - Women's singles – quarter-finals
    - (Russia) Maria Sharapova [5] def. (Belgium) Justine Henin [1], 6–4, 6–0
    - (Serbia) Jelena Janković [3] def. (United States) Serena Williams [7], 6–3, 6–4

== 21 January 2008 (Monday) ==
- Association football: 2008 Africa Cup of Nations:
  - Group A: Namibia 1 – 5 Morocco
  - Group B: Nigeria 0 – 1 Ivory Coast
  - Group B: Mali 1 – 0 Benin
- Cricket
  - Zimbabwean cricket team in Pakistan in 2007–08
    - 1st ODI-Pakistan 347/5 (50 overs) beat Zimbabwe 243/7 (50 overs) by 104 runs
- Tennis: 2008 Australian Open
  - Men's singles – fourth round
    - (Switzerland) Roger Federer [1] def. (Czech Republic) Tomáš Berdych [13], 6–4, 7–6^{7}, 6–3
    - (United States) James Blake [12] def. (Croatia) Marin Čilić, 6–3, 6–4, 6–4
    - (Serbia) Novak Djokovic [3] def. (Australia) Lleyton Hewitt [19], 7–5, 6–3, 6–3
    - (Spain) David Ferrer [5] def. (Spain) Juan Carlos Ferrero [22], 7–5, 3–6, 6–4, 6–1
  - Women's singles – fourth round
    - (United States) Venus Williams [8] def. (Poland) Marta Domachowska [Q], 6–4, 6–4
    - (Serbia) Ana Ivanovic [4] def. (Denmark) Caroline Wozniacki, 6–1, 7–6^{2}
    - (Slovakia) Daniela Hantuchová [9] def. (Russia) Maria Kirilenko [27], 1–6, 6–4, 6–4
    - (Poland) Agnieszka Radwańska [29] def. (Russia) Nadia Petrova [14], 1–6, 7–5, 6–0

== 20 January 2008 (Sunday) ==
- American football:
  - NFL Playoffs: Conference championship games
    - New England Patriots 21, San Diego Chargers 12
      - The Patriots become the first NFL team to start a season 18–0–0, including the playoffs. Tom Brady throws three interceptions, keeping the game close. But the ball-control running of Laurence Maroney (who tallies 122 yards and a touchdown) and a tough New England defense ensure the Patriots keep the ball for nearly 22 minutes of the second half. The Chargers get only nine points out of four red-zone possessions on offense.
    - New York Giants 23 Green Bay Packers 20 (OT)
      - Giants placekicker Lawrence Tynes misses two attempts at a game-winning field goal in the fourth quarter. Green Bay wins the toss in overtime, but Corey Webster intercepts Brett Favre, giving Tynes another shot. His 47-yard kick is good, sending the Giants to their first Super Bowl in seven years. Plaxico Burress records 11 catches for 154 yards. Favre throws two touchdown passes, one a 90-yarder to Donald Driver, but Ryan Grant is held to 29 yards. The Super Bowl will be a rematch of the Giants-Patriots battle from the last week of the regular season.
- Association football: 2008 Africa Cup of Nations:
  - Group A: Ghana 2 – 1 Guinea
    - Sulley Muntari gets the three-week Africa Cup of Nations off to a great start for hosts Ghana, scoring a 90th minute screamer.
- Cricket:
  - West Indian cricket team in South Africa in 2007–08
    - 1st ODI-South Africa 176/4 (34 overs) beat West Indies 175 (35.5 overs) by 6 wickets
- Rugby union: 2007–08 Heineken Cup pool stage, Round 6
  - In Pool 2, (England) Gloucester win the pool and earn a home quarterfinal with a 29–21 home win over (Ireland) Ulster. (European Rugby Cup)
  - Also in Pool 2, (Wales) Ospreys secure the other second-place quarterfinal berth with a 28–21 away win over (France) Bourgoin. (European Rugby Cup)
  - In Pool 3, the last quarterfinal berth is decided when the (Wales) Cardiff Blues shut out homestanding (England) Bristol 17–0. The Blues, however, fall one converted try short of securing a home quarterfinal, which instead goes to (France) Toulouse. (European Rugby Cup)
- Tennis: 2008 Australian Open
  - Men's singles – third round
    - (Spain) David Ferrer [5] def. (United States) Vincent Spadea, 6–3 6–3 6–2
    - (Spain) Juan Carlos Ferrero [22] def. (Argentina) David Nalbandian [10], 6–1, 6–2, 6–3
  - Men's singles – fourth round
    - (Spain) Rafael Nadal [2] def. (France) Paul-Henri Mathieu [23], 6–4, 3–0 ret.
    - (Russia) Mikhail Youzhny [14] def. (Russia) Nikolay Davydenko [4], 7–6^{2}, 6–3, 6–1
    - (France) Jo-Wilfried Tsonga def. (France) Richard Gasquet [8], 6–2, 6–7^{5}, 7–6^{6}, 6–3
    - (Finland) Jarkko Nieminen [24] def. (Germany) Philipp Kohlschreiber [29], 3–6 7–6^{7} 7–6^{9}, 6–3
  - Women's singles – third round
    - (Slovakia) Daniela Hantuchová [9] def. (Spain) Virginia Ruano Pascual, 6–2, 6–3
    - (Russia) Nadia Petrova [14] def. (Russia) Ekaterina Makarova, 6–1, 7–6^{8}
    - (Poland) Marta Domachowska [Q] def. (China) Li Na [24], 2–6, 6–2, 6–4
    - (Denmark) Caroline Wozniacki def. (Germany) Sabine Lisicki [Q], 4–6, 6–4, 6–3
  - Women's singles – fourth round
    - (Belgium) Justine Henin [1] def. (Chinese Taipei) Hsieh Su-wei [Q], 6–2, 6–2
    - (Serbia) Jelena Janković [3] def. (Australia) Casey Dellacqua, 7–6^{3}, 6–1
    - (Russia) Maria Sharapova [5] def. (Russia) Elena Dementieva [11], 6–0, 6–2
    - (United States) Serena Williams [7] def. (Czech Republic) Nicole Vaidišová [12], 6–3, 6–4

== 19 January 2008 (Saturday) ==
- Rugby union: 2007–08 Heineken Cup pool stage, Round 6
  - In Pool 1, (England) London Irish win the pool and earn a home quarterfinal with a 24–11 away win over (Italy) Benetton Treviso. (European Rugby Cup)
  - Also in Pool 1, (France) Perpignan secure a quarterfinal berth as one of the two top second-place finishers, shutting out (Wales) Newport Gwent Dragons 25–0 in Newport. (European Rugby Cup)
  - In Pool 5, (Ireland) Munster, in their "Fortress Thomond", ensure that there will be a new Cup holder in 2008, eliminating the current holders (England) London Wasps 19–3. (European Rugby Cup)
  - (France) Toulouse win Pool 6 in style, picking up a four-try bonus point in a 34–10 home win over (Scotland) Edinburgh. (European Rugby Cup)
- Cricket:
  - Indian cricket team in Australia in 2007–08
    - 3rd Test-India 330 & 294 beat Australia 212 & 340 by 72 runs
      - India ends Australia's winning streak to prevent them from getting a world-record 17th consecutive win.
- U.S. college basketball:
  - Top-ranked North Carolina, off to its best start in over 20 years and an 18-point home favorite, falls from the unbeaten ranks 82–80 to Maryland. (AP via ESPN)

== 18 January 2008 (Friday) ==
- Rugby union: 2007–08 Heineken Cup pool stage, Round 6
  - In Pool 4, (England) Saracens become the first team to advance to the quarterfinals, defeating (Scotland) Glasgow Warriors 21–17 in Glasgow. The win also assures Saracens a home quarterfinal. (European Rugby Cup)

== 17 January 2008 (Thursday) ==
- Basketball: Euroleague
  - One club (in **bold**) secures a spot in the Top 16 phase:
    - In Group B, the 81–76 win of already-qualified (Israel) Maccabi Tel Aviv over (Croatia) Cibona in Zagreb sends (Greece) **Aris Thessaloniki** through. (Euroleague)

== 16 January 2008 (Wednesday) ==
- Basketball: Euroleague
  - One club (in **bold**) secures a spot in the Top 16 phase:
    - In Group B, (Turkey) **Efes Pilsen** defeat already-qualified (Lithuania) Lietuvos Rytas Vilnius 90–84 at home. (Euroleague)

== 15 January 2008 (Tuesday) ==
- Association football:
  - The G-14 group of leading European football clubs announces that it will disband on 15 February, after both FIFA and UEFA agree to compensate clubs for releasing their players to join national squads for Euro 2008, the 2010 FIFA World Cup and Euro 2012. (ESPNsoccernet)
- College athletics:
  - The National Collegiate Athletic Association, the largest governing body of college sports in the United States, will allow Canadian universities to join as Division II schools as of June 1, 2008. Canadian Interuniversity Sport, the governing body of university sports in Canada, has yet to respond as to whether Canadian universities who join the NCAA will still maintain membership in the CIS, though some Canadian schools are currently members of both CIS and the National Association of Intercollegiate Athletics. It is expected that the UBC Thunderbirds and Simon Fraser Clan will be among the first university teams to join the NCAA. (CIS via TSN)

== 14 January 2008 (Monday) ==
- Cricket:
  - Bangladesh cricket team in New Zealand in 2007–08
    - 2nd Test: New Zealand 393 (103.2 ov.) beat Bangladesh 143 (45.3 ov.) & 113/9 (47 ov.) by an innings and 137 runs
- Tennis:
  - The 2008 Australian Open commences, with Serena Williams and Jelena Janković kicking off the event against Jarmila Gajdošová and Tamira Paszek respectively.

== 13 January 2008 (Sunday) ==
- American football:
  - NFL Playoffs Divisional Round Games
    - San Diego Chargers 28, Indianapolis Colts 24
      - With Philip Rivers and LaDainian Tomlinson injured, backups Billy Volek and Michael Turner lead San Diego on the game-winning touchdown drive. Peyton Manning throws for 402 yards and three touchdowns in the loss. The now-former-defending Super Bowl champion Colts' loss assures the NFL of a new recipient of the Super Bowl's Vince Lombardi Trophy in 2008 (the 2003–2004 New England Patriots remain the last team with back-to-back world championships).
    - New York Giants 21, Dallas Cowboys 17
      - After allowing 96 and 90-yard touchdown drives in the first half, the Giants defense solidifies in the second. R. W. McQuarters intercepts Tony Romo in the end zone to clinch the game. Amani Toomer catches two touchdown passes for New York.
- Association football:
  - International club friendly at the Citrus Bowl, Orlando, Florida, United States
    - C.D. Guadalajara 2 – 1 Deportivo Cali

== 12 January 2008 (Saturday) ==
- American football:
  - NFL Playoffs Divisional Round Games
    - Green Bay Packers 42, Seattle Seahawks 20
      - The Seahawks convert two early fumbles by Green Bay tailback Ryan Grant into touchdowns and take a 14–0 lead. But Grant comes back to rush for 201 yards and three touchdowns, while Brett Favre throws for three more scores. The Packers outgain Seattle on the ground, 235 yards to 22.
    - New England Patriots 31, Jacksonville Jaguars 20
      - Tom Brady sets an NFL passing-accuracy record by going 26-for-28 for 262 yards and three touchdowns.
- Cricket:
  - West Indian cricket team in South Africa in 2007–08
    - 3rd Test: South Africa 556/4 dec (120 ov.) beat West Indies 139 (34.3 ov.) & 317 (86.5 ov.) by an innings and 100 runs
- Association football: Premier League
  - Manchester United 6 – 0 Newcastle United
    - Cristiano Ronaldo scores a hat-trick, the first of his career, as the Red Devils go level in the league with Arsenal. He scores a free kick in the 49th minute, and also in the 70th and 88th minutes.
- U.S. college basketball:
  - Two of the five previously unbeaten teams in Division I men's basketball go down:
    - First, #13 Vanderbilt comes back from a 16-point deficit to force overtime against Kentucky in Lexington, but eventually goes down 79–73 in double overtime.
    - Then, in a showdown of top-5 teams in Los Angeles, #5 UCLA beats #4 Washington State 81–74.

== 10 January 2008 (Thursday) ==
- Basketball:
  - Euroleague: Five clubs (in **bold**) secure spots in the Top 16 phase, and one (in **bold italics**) is eliminated from Top 16 contention.
    - In Group A:
      - (Greece) **Olympiacos** defeat already-qualified group leaders (Russia) CSKA Moscow 71–67 at home. (Euroleague)
      - (Lithuania) **Žalgiris** defeat (Slovenia) Olimpija Ljubljana 83–74 in Ljubljana. This result also sends (Spain) **TAU Cerámica** through. (Euroleague)
    - In Group B:
      - (Israel) **Maccabi Tel Aviv** punch their ticket with an 87–68 home win over already-qualified (Spain) Unicaja Málaga. (Euroleague)
      - (Turkey) Efes Pilsen defeat (France) **Le Mans** 91–84 in overtime in Le Mans, making the hosts the first club to be eliminated from Top 16 contention. (Euroleague)
    - In Group C:
      - (Spain) **Real Madrid** go through with an 80–72 away win over (Serbia) Partizan Belgrade. (Euroleague)
  - NCAA Division I:
    - George Washington defeats Saint Louis 46–20. The 20 points registered by the Billikens are the lowest since the introduction of the shot clock to Men's basketball in the 1985–86 season.

== 9 January 2008 (Wednesday) ==
- Basketball: Euroleague
  - One club (in **bold**) secures a spot in the Top 16 phase:
    - In Group A, (Italy) **Montepaschi Siena** defeat (Spain) TAU Cerámica 83–71 at home. (Euroleague)

== 8 January 2008 (Tuesday) ==
- Baseball
  - Baseball Hall of Fame balloting, 2008: Former relief pitcher Rich "Goose" Gossage is elected to the Hall of Fame on his ninth try. The former New York Yankees star closer received 85.8 percent of the vote, and is the only player voted in for 2008.

== 7 January 2008 (Monday) ==
- American football:
  - NCAA Division I FBS bowl games:
    - **BCS** – National Championship Game in New Orleans: LSU 38, Ohio State 24
      - The Buckeyes scored 10 points to begin the game, but the Tigers responded with 31 unanswered points and never looked back.

== 6 January 2008 (Sunday) ==
- American football:
  - NCAA Division I FBS bowl games:
    - GMAC Bowl in Mobile: Tulsa 63, Bowling Green 7
      - The Golden Hurricane, behind an NCAA-record 14th consecutive 300-yard passing game from Paul Smith, blow out the Falcons and amass the biggest winning margin in bowl game history.
  - NFL Playoff Wild Card Games:
    - New York Giants 24, Tampa Bay Buccaneers 14
      - The Bucs commit three turnovers while the Giants don't turn the ball over at all, and Eli Manning throws for 185 yards and 2 touchdowns in his first career playoff win.
    - San Diego Chargers 17, Tennessee Titans 6
      - The Chargers score 17 unanswered points to win their first playoff game in 13 years.
- Cricket:
  - Indian cricket team in Australia in 2007–08:
    - 2nd Test: Australia 463 (112.3 ov.) & 401/7 dec. (107 ov.) beat India 532 (138.2 ov.) & 210 (70.5 ov.) by 122 runs
      - Australia equal their all-time record of 16 consecutive Test wins amid controversy over dubious umpiring decisions and alleged racist sledging by Indian off-spinner Harbhajan Singh.

== 5 January 2008 (Saturday) ==
- American football:
  - NCAA Division I FBS bowl games:
    - International Bowl in Toronto: Rutgers 52, Ball State 30
      - In what proved to be his last college game, Ray Rice runs for 280 yards and four touchdowns to lead the Scarlet Knights to their second straight bowl win.
  - NFL Playoff Wild Card Games:
    - Seattle Seahawks 35, Washington Redskins 14
      - Todd Collins throws two touchdown passes in 2:15 to give the Redskins a 14–13 lead. But Matt Hasselbeck responds with a 20-yard scoring strike to D.J. Hackett, then the Seahawks defense returns two Collins interceptions for touchdowns.
    - Jacksonville Jaguars 31, Pittsburgh Steelers 29
      - Ben Roethlisberger leads the Steelers back from a 28–10 deficit in the fourth quarter, but also throws three interceptions. A 32-yard run by David Garrard on fourth-and-1 leads to Josh Scobee's game-winning 25-yard field goal. A fumble by Roethlisberger in the closing minute delivers the victory for the Jaguars.
- Cricket:
  - Bangladesh cricket team in New Zealand in 2007–08
    - 1st Test: New Zealand 357 (91 ov.) & 39/1 (8.1 ov.) beat Bangladesh 137 (46.1 ov.) & 254 (83.1 ov.) by 9 wickets
  - West Indian cricket team in South Africa in 2007–08
    - 2nd Test: South Africa 321 (118.2 ov.) & 186/3 (35.2 ov.) beat West Indies 243 (92.0 ov.) & 262 (101.5 ov.) by 7 wickets

== 4 January 2008 (Friday) ==
- 2008 Dakar Rally: Rally cancelled due to recent terrorist attacks against French tourists in Mauritania.
- Tennis:
  - The International Tennis Federation imposes a two-year ban on Swiss star Martina Hingis after she tested positive for cocaine at Wimbledon in 2007. Hingis had previously announced her second retirement after reports of the positive test surfaced in November 2007. (AP via ESPN.com)

== 3 January 2008 (Thursday) ==
- American football:
  - NCAA Division I FBS bowl games
    - **BCS** – Orange Bowl in Miami Gardens, Florida: Kansas 24, Virginia Tech 21
- Basketball: Euroleague
  - Two more clubs (in **bold**) secure spots in the Top 16 phase, each by defeating one of the two French sides in the competition:
    - In Group B, (Lithuania) **Lietuvos Rytas** crush (France) Le Mans 85–50 at home. (Euroleague)
    - In Group C, (Spain) **AXA FC Barcelona** defeat (France) Roanne 89–79 in Clermont-Ferrand. (Euroleague)

== 2 January 2008 (Wednesday) ==
- American football:
  - NCAA Division I FBS bowl games:
    - **BCS** – Fiesta Bowl in Glendale, Arizona: (11) West Virginia 48, (3) Oklahoma 28
      - Behind interim head coach Bill Stewart, the Mountaineers rush for 350 yards and four touchdowns against one of the nation's best run defenses.
- Basketball: Euroleague
  - Three clubs (in **bold**) are the first to clinch spots in the Top 16 phase:
    - In Group A, (Russia) **CSKA Moscow** defeat (Slovenia) Olimpija Ljubljana 74–57 at home. (Euroleague)
    - In Group B, (Spain) **Unicaja Málaga** defeat (Italy) Armani Jeans Milano 89–70, also at home. (Euroleague)
    - In Group C, (Greece) **Panathinaikos** punch their ticket with a 67–66 home win over (Serbia) Partizan Belgrade. (Euroleague)

== 1 January 2008 (Tuesday) ==
- Ice hockey:
  - NHL Winter Classic held at Ralph Wilson Stadium in Orchard Park, New York
    - Pittsburgh Penguins 2, Buffalo Sabres 1 (SO)
    Sidney Crosby picks up and assist on a Colby Armstrong goal 21 seconds into the game and ends the game by scoring against Ryan Miller in the final attempt of the overtime shootout. Brian Campbell scores for the Sabres at 1:25 of the 2nd period. An NHL-record crowd of 71,217 turns out despite a steady snow.
- American football:
  - NCAA Division I FBS bowl games:
    - Outback Bowl in Tampa: (16) Tennessee 21, (18) Wisconsin 17
    - Cotton Bowl Classic in Dallas: (7) Missouri 38, (25) Arkansas 7
      - Missouri running back Tony Temple sets Cotton Bowl Classic records with 281 rushing yards and four touchdowns.
    - Gator Bowl in Jacksonville: Texas Tech 31, (21) Virginia 28
    - Capital One Bowl in Orlando: Michigan 41, (9) Florida 35
      - Michigan quarterback Chad Henne throws for 373 yards and three touchdowns in Lloyd Carr's last game as Wolverines head coach.
    - **BCS** – Rose Bowl in Pasadena: (6) USC 49, (13) Illinois 17
    - **BCS** – Sugar Bowl in New Orleans: (4) Georgia 41, (10) Hawaiʻi 10
      - The Bulldogs' defense records eight sacks and five takeaways against the formerly undefeated Warriors.
