= 2007–08 ABA NLB League =

2007-08 NLB League season
- League: NLB League
- Sport: Basketball
- Teams: Serbia (5 teams); Croatia (4 teams); Slovenia (3 teams); Bosnia and Herzegovina (1 team); Montenegro (1 team)

Regular season
- Season champions: (Serbia) Partizan Igokea
- Season MVP: (Serbia) Tadija Dragićević (Crvena zvezda)
- Top scorer: (Serbia) Tadija Dragićević (Crvena zvezda) (20.46 ppg)

Final four
- Champions: (Serbia) Partizan Igokea
- Runners-up: (Serbia) Hemofarm STADA

NLB League seasons
- ← 2006–07 2008–09 →

The ABA NLB League 2007–08, the seventh season of the regional Liga ABA, saw a further change in the competition structure. After trying a playoff system the previous year, the league returned to a combination of elimination and a Final Four tournament.

14 teams from Slovenia, Montenegro, Bosnia and Herzegovina, Croatia and Serbia participated in the NLB League in its seventh season: Union Olimpija, Helios, Geoplin Slovan, Cibona, Zadar, Zagreb, Split, Široki ERONET, Crvena zvezda, Partizan, Hemofarm, FMP Železnik, Vojvodina and Budućnost.

There were 26 rounds played in the regular part of the season. Eight best teams from the regular season qualified for the best-of-three quarter-final series. The Final Four Tournament was later held in Ljubljana.

Partizan became the 2008 League Champion.

== Team information ==
=== Venues and locations ===
Country	Teams	Team	City	Venue (Capacity)
Serbia	5			
Serbia	5	Partizan	Belgrade	Pionir Hall (8,150)
Serbia	5	Hemofarm STADA	Vršac	Millennium Center (5,000)
Serbia	5	Crvena zvezda	Belgrade	Pionir Hall (8,150)
Serbia	5	FMP Železnik	Belgrade	Železnik Hall (3,000)
Serbia	5	Vojvodina Srbijagas	Novi Sad	SPC Vojvodina (8000)
Croatia	4			
Croatia	4	Cibona	Zagreb	Dražen Petrović Basketball Hall (5,400)
Croatia	4	Zadar	Zadar	Jazine (3,000)
Croatia	4	Zagreb CO	Zagreb	Trnsko (2,000)
Croatia	4	Split CO	Split	Arena Gripe (6,000)
Slovenia	3			
Slovenia	3	Union Olimpija	Ljubljana	Hala Tivoli (6,000)
Slovenia	3	Helios	Domžale	Dvorana Komunalnega centra (2,180)
Slovenia	3	Geoplin Slovan	Ljubljana	Kodeljevo Hall (3,080)
Bosnia and Herzegovina	1			
Bosnia and Herzegovina	1	Široki Prima pivo	Široki Brijeg	"Pecara" (4,500)
Montenegro	1			
Montenegro	1	Budućnost	Podgorica	Morača Sports Center (4,570)

== Regular season ==
Pos	Team	Pld	W	L	PF	PA	PD	Pts	Qualification or relegation
1	Partizan Igokea	26	24	2	2119	1855	+264	50	Qualified for Playoffs
2	Zadar	26	18	8	2080	2001	+79	44	Qualified for Playoffs
3	Hemofarm STADA	26	16	10	2063	1986	+77	42	Qualified for Playoffs
4	Crvena zvezda	26	16	10	2275	2212	+63	42	Qualified for Playoffs
5	Union Olimpija	26	15	11	2071	1961	+110	41	Qualified for Playoffs
6	Budućnost	26	15	11	2099	2014	+85	41	Qualified for Playoffs
7	FMP Železnik	26	15	11	2147	2083	+64	41	Qualified for Playoffs
8	Cibona	26	15	11	2117	2103	+14	41	Qualified for Playoffs
9	Vojvodina Srbijagas	26	12	14	1971	1991	−20	38	
10	Split CO	26	11	15	2018	2069	−51	37	
11	Zagreb CO	26	7	19	2043	2167	−124	33	
12	Široki Prima pivo	26	7	19	1949	2080	−131	33	Relegated
13	Helios	26	6	20	1986	2127	−141	32	
14	Geoplin Slovan	26	5	21	1907	2196	−289	31	Relegated

== Stats Leaders ==
=== Points ===
Rank	Name	Team	Points	Games	PPG
1.	(Serbia) Tadija Dragićević	Crvena zvezda	573	28	20,46
2.	(United States) Marlon Garnett	Split	460	24	19,17
3.	(Croatia) Jakov Vladović	Zagreb	448	25	17,92
4.	(United States) Omar Cook	Crvena zvezda	479	29	16,52
5.	(Croatia) Robert Troha	Helios	388	25	15,52

=== Rebounds ===
Rank	Name	Team	Rebounds	Games	RPG
1.	(Montenegro) Vladimir Golubović	Vojvodina	227	26	8,73
2.	(Croatia) Ante Tomić	Zagreb	186	26	7,15
3.	(North Macedonia) Todor Gečevski	Zadar	211	30	7,03
4.	(Croatia) Andrija Stipanović	Split	179	26	6,88
5.	(Bulgaria) Dejan Ivanov	Split	161	25	6,44

=== Assists ===
Rank	Name	Team	Assists	Games	APG
1.	(United States) Omar Cook	Crvena zvezda	188	29	6,48
2.	(United States) Anthony Akins	Split	149	25	5,96
3.	(Croatia) Jakov Vladović	Zagreb	110	25	4,40
4.	(United States) Milton Palacio	Partizan	109	28	3,89
5.	(United States) Corey Brewer	Zadar	108	30	3,60

=== Ranking MVP ===
Rank	Name	Team	Efficiency	Games	Average
1.	(Serbia) Tadija Dragićević	Crvena zvezda	614	28	21,93
2.	(United States) Omar Cook	Crvena zvezda	600	29	20,69
3.	(Montenegro) Nikola Peković	Partizan	565	28	20,18
4.	(Croatia) Jakov Vladović	Zagreb	492	25	19,68
5.	(Montenegro) Vladimir Golubović	Vojvodina	474	26	18,23

== Playoffs ==
Team #1	Agg.	Team #2	1st leg	2nd leg	3rd leg^{*}
Partizan Igokea (Serbia)	2 - 0	(Croatia) Cibona	90 - 80	100 - 93	–
Zadar (Croatia)	2 - 1	(Serbia) FMP Železnik	95 - 91 (ot)	94 - 99 (ot)	74 - 73
Hemofarm STADA (Serbia)	2 - 1	(Montenegro) Budućnost	87 - 71	55 - 64	75 - 69
Crvena zvezda (Serbia)	1 - 2	(Slovenia) Union Olimpija	93 - 87	60 - 88	74 - 97

* if necessary

== Final four ==
Matches played at Hala Tivoli, Ljubljana

Semifinals; April 25.
1	Partizan Igokea	94
5	Union Olimpija	90
2	Zadar	72
3	Hemofarm STADA	81

Final; April 26.
1	Partizan Igokea	69
3	Hemofarm STADA	51

=== Semifinals ===
==== Partizan vs. Union Olimpija ====
April 25
20:45 CET

Report

Partizan (Serbia)	94–90	(Slovenia) Union Olimpija
Scoring by quarter: 25-22, 16-23, 27-16, 26-29
Pts: Peković 31; Rebs: Veličković 6 Asts: Palacio, Kecman 3		Pts: Bailey 24; Rebs: Zupan 7 Asts: Bailey 3

Hala Tivoli, Ljubljana
Attendance: 5,500
Referees: Muhvić (CRO), Dožai (CRO), Radović (CRO)

==== Zadar vs. Hemofarm STADA ====
April 25
18:15 CET

Report

Zadar (Croatia)	72–81	(Serbia) Hemofarm STADA
Scoring by quarter: 24-21, 16-21, 22-20, 10-19
Pts: Johnson 19; Rebs: Štimac 15; Asts: Brewer 4		Pts: Pavković, Joksimović 13; Rebs: Joksimović 8 Asts: Pavković 7

Hala Tivoli, Ljubljana
Attendance: 3,000
Referees: Šutulović (MNE), Obradović (BIH), Boltauzer (SLO)

=== Final ===
April 26
20:45 CET

Report

Partizan (Serbia)	69–51	(Serbia) Hemofarm STADA
Scoring by quarter: 18-15, 22-12, 19-11, 10-13
Pts: Peković, 22; Rebs: Peković 7 Asts: Palacio 3		Pts: Marković 11; Rebs: Marjanović 7 Asts: Pavković 3

Hala Tivoli, Ljubljana
Attendance: 2,000
Referees: Belošević (SRB), Pukl (SLO), Šutulović (MNE)

2007–08 ABA NLB League Champions
(Serbia)
Partizan
2nd title

== ABA clubs in European competitions ==
Competition	Team	Progress	Result
Euroleague	(Serbia) Partizan	Quarterfinals	Eliminated by (Spain) Tau Cerámica, 1–2
Euroleague	(Slovenia) Union Olimpija	Regular Season Group A	6th place
Euroleague	(Croatia) Cibona	Regular Season Group B	6th place
ULEB Cup	(Serbia) Hemofarm	Top 16	Eliminated by (Spain) Akasvayu Girona, 133–156
ULEB Cup	(Serbia) Crvena zvezda	Top 16	Eliminated by (Turkey) Beşiktaş, 149–161
ULEB Cup	(Croatia) Zadar	Top 16	Eliminated by (Spain) Valencia, 144–162
ULEB Cup	(Montenegro) Budućnost	Top 32	Eliminated by (Serbia) Hemofarm, 134–155
ULEB Cup	(Serbia) FMP	Regular Season Group B	5th place
FIBA EuroCup	(Croatia) Zagreb CO	Quarter-finals	Eliminated by (Latvia) Barons LMT, 1–2
