= 2007–08 Euroleague Regular Season Group C =

Standings and Results for Group C of the Regular Season phase of the 2007–08 Euroleague basketball tournament.

Main page: 2007–08 Euroleague

Key to colors
Top five places in each group, plus highest-ranked sixth-place team, advance to Top 16
Eliminated

== Standings ==
	Team	Pld	W	L	PF	PA	Diff
1.	(Greece) Panathinaikos	14	12	2	1156	1037	+119
2.	(Spain) Real Madrid	14	11	3	1137	1015	+122
3.	(Spain) AXA FC Barcelona	14	9	5	1082	991	+91
4.	(Turkey) Fenerbahçe	14	6	8	1087	1113	−26
5.	(Serbia) Partizan Belgrade	14	6	8	1100	1103	−3
6.	(Italy) Lottomatica Roma	14	6	8	1071	1093	−22
7.	(France) Roanne	14	4	10	1104	1224	−120
8.	(Germany) Brose Baskets	14	2	12	879	1040	−161

- Fenerbahçe are fourth based on a 3-1 record against Partizan and Lottomatica, with Partizan at 2-2 and Lottomatica at 1-3.

== Fixtures and results ==
All times given below are in Central European Time.

Unless otherwise indicated, all attendance totals are from the corresponding match report posted on the official Euroleague site and included with each game summary.

=== Game 1 ===
October 24–25, 2007

October 24
19:45

(Report)

Panathinaikos (Greece)	86–83	(Italy) Lottomatica Roma
Scoring by quarter: 20-26, 15-19, 27-13, 24-25

Olympic Indoor Hall, Athens
Attendance: 12,000

October 24
20:45

(Report)

Partizan Belgrade (Serbia)	81–78	(Spain) AXA FC Barcelona
Scoring by quarter: 15-20, 27-21, 20-13, 19-24

Pionir Hall, Belgrade
Attendance: 6,137

October 25
19:15

(Report)

Fenerbahçe (Turkey)	72–80	(Spain) Real Madrid
Scoring by quarter: 10-30, 21-18, 26-20, 15-12

Abdi İpekçi Arena, Istanbul
Attendance: 5,000

October 25
20:45

(Report)

Brose Baskets (Germany)	61–64	(France) Roanne
Scoring by quarter: 10-19, 15-10, 14-21, 22-14

Jako Arena, Bamberg
Attendance: 6,800

=== Game 2 ===
October 31 – November 1, 2007

October 31
19:45

(Report)

Panathinaikos (Greece)	66–61	(Germany) Brose Baskets
Scoring by quarter: 20-17, 13-12, 21-16, 12-16

Olympic Indoor Hall, Athens
Attendance: 7,000

October 31
20:30

(Report)

Roanne (France)	87–88	(Serbia) Partizan Belgrade
Scoring by quarter: 23-23, 12-21, 28-26, 24-18

Maison des Sports, Clermont-Ferrand
Attendance: 5,000

November 1
20:00

(Report)

Real Madrid (Spain)	89–83	(Italy) Lottomatica Roma
Scoring by quarter: 29-17, 16-24, 21-22, 23-19

Palacio Vistalegre, Madrid
Attendance: 10,800

November 1
20:45

(Report)

AXA FC Barcelona (Spain)	82–67	(Turkey) Fenerbahçe
Scoring by quarter: 26-13, 18-23, 15-16, 23-15

Palau Blaugrana, Barcelona
Attendance: 4,302

=== Game 3 ===
November 6–8, 2007

November 6
19:15

(Report)

Fenerbahçe (Turkey)	85–66	(Italy) Lottomatica Roma
Scoring by quarter: 20-10, 22-24, 23-13, 20-19

Abdi İpekçi Arena, Istanbul
Attendance: 1,200

November 7
20:45

(Report)

Brose Baskets (Germany)	49–59	(Spain) Real Madrid
Scoring by quarter: 17-16, 14-14, 8-14, 10-15

Jako Arena, Bamberg
Attendance: 8,000

November 7
20:45

(Report)

Partizan Belgrade (Serbia)	90–94	(Greece) Panathinaikos
Scoring by quarter: 16-24, 25-22, 29-23, 20-25

Pionir Hall, Belgrade
Attendance: 6,825

November 8
20:45

(Report)

AXA FC Barcelona (Spain)	82–76	(France) Roanne
Scoring by quarter: 20-14, 22-20, 17-17, 23-25

Palau Blaugrana, Barcelona
Attendance: 2,907

=== Game 4 ===
November 14–15, 2007

November 14
20:30

(Report)

Roanne (France)	90–97	(Turkey) Fenerbahçe
Scoring by quarter: 33-24, 21-25, 12-20, 24-28

Maison des Sports, Clermont-Ferrand
Attendance: 2,000

November 14
20:45

(Report)

Real Madrid (Spain)	75–64	(Serbia) Partizan Belgrade
Scoring by quarter: 20-11, 13-10, 26-21, 16-22

Palacio Vistalegre, Madrid
Attendance: 8,000

November 15
20:30

(Report)

Lottomatica Roma (Italy)	81–57	(Germany) Brose Baskets
Scoring by quarter: 19-10, 22-15, 23-24, 17-8

PalaLottomatica, Rome
Attendance: 2,951

November 15
20:30

(Report)

Panathinaikos (Greece)	76–66	(Spain) AXA FC Barcelona
Scoring by quarter: 19-15, 17-22, 20-10, 20-19

Olympic Indoor Hall, Athens
Attendance: 15,000

=== Game 5 ===
November 21–22, 2007

November 21
20:30

(Report)

Roanne (France)	83–123	(Greece) Panathinaikos
Scoring by quarter: 22-29, 17-35, 22-30, 22-29

Maison des Sports, Clermont-Ferrand
Attendance: 3,000

November 21
20:45

(Report)

Partizan Belgrade (Serbia)	91–86	(Italy) Lottomatica Roma
Scoring by quarter: 25-26, 29-25, 18-19, 19-16

Pionir Hall, Belgrade
Attendance: 5,245

November 22
19:15

(Report)

Fenerbahçe (Turkey)	79–77	(Germany) Brose Baskets
Scoring by quarter: 23-20, 9-16, 18-18, 29-23

Abdi İpekçi Arena, Istanbul
Attendance: 3,000

November 22
20:45

(Report)

AXA FC Barcelona (Spain)	73–62	(Spain) Real Madrid
Scoring by quarter: 24-13, 24-23, 6-15, 19-11

Palau Blaugrana, Barcelona
Attendance: 7,311

=== Game 6 ===
November 28–29, 2007

November 28
20:30

(Report)

Lottomatica Roma (Italy)	65–74	(Spain) AXA FC Barcelona
Scoring by quarter: 9-22, 22-15, 19-23, 15-14

PalaLottomatica, Rome
Attendance: 4,803

November 28
20:45

(Report)

Brose Baskets (Germany)	78–62	(Serbia) Partizan Belgrade
Scoring by quarter: 22-12, 19-15, 16-21, 21-14

Jako Arena, Bamberg
Attendance: 6,800

November 29
19:15

(Report)

Fenerbahçe (Turkey)	64–83	(Greece) Panathinaikos
Scoring by quarter: 20-19, 19-24, 5-22, 20-18

Abdi İpekçi Arena, Istanbul
Attendance: 4,500

November 29
20:45

(Report)

Real Madrid (Spain)	104–73	(France) Roanne
Scoring by quarter: 24-15, 26-25, 24-16, 30-17

Palacio Vistalegre, Madrid
Attendance: 11,000

=== Game 7 ===
December 5–6, 2007

December 5
20:30

(Report)

Roanne (France)	104–85	(Italy) Lottomatica Roma
Scoring by quarter: 26-15, 23-26, 26-16, 29-28

Maison des Sports, Clermont-Ferrand
Attendance: 1,200

December 5
20:45

(Report)

Partizan Belgrade (Serbia)	72–76	(Turkey) Fenerbahçe
Scoring by quarter: 16-20, 18-15, 18-20, 20-21

Pionir Hall, Belgrade
Attendance: 6,528

December 5
20:45

(Report)

AXA FC Barcelona (Spain)	80–58	(Germany) Brose Baskets
Scoring by quarter: 16-11, 21-22, 18-9, 25-16

Palau Blaugrana, Barcelona
Attendance: 3,524

December 6
20:30

(Report)

Panathinaikos (Greece)	92–85	(Spain) Real Madrid
Scoring by quarter: 26-20, 20-27, 19-21, 27-17

Olympic Indoor Hall, Athens
Attendance: 13,000

=== Game 8 ===
December 12–13, 2007

December 12
20:30

(Report)

Roanne (France)	84–81	(Germany) Brose Baskets
Scoring by quarter: 21-20, 12-16, 24-21, 27-24

Maison des Sports, Clermont-Ferrand
Attendance: 1,500

December 13
20:30

(Report)

Lottomatica Roma (Italy)	85–67	(Greece) Panathinaikos
Scoring by quarter: 20-23, 28-25, 20-9, 17-10

PalaLottomatica, Rome
Attendance: 3,720

December 13
20:45

(Report)

AXA FC Barcelona (Spain)	95–69	(Serbia) Partizan Belgrade
Scoring by quarter: 28-14, 19-22, 18-15, 30-18

Palau Blaugrana, Barcelona
Attendance: 3,427

December 13
20:45

(Report)

Real Madrid (Spain)	87–77	(Turkey) Fenerbahçe
Scoring by quarter: 26-18, 21-15, 15-17, 25-27

Palacio Vistalegre, Madrid
Attendance: 6,000

=== Game 9 ===
December 19–20, 2007

December 19
20:45

(Report)

Brose Baskets (Germany)	58–72	(Greece) Panathinaikos
Scoring by quarter: 8-17, 20-23, 15-13, 15-19

Jako Arena, Bamberg
Attendance: 6,800

December 19
20:45

(Report)

Partizan Belgrade (Serbia)	82–76	(France) Roanne
Scoring by quarter: 14-30, 26-21, 20-13, 22-12

Pionir Hall, Belgrade
Attendance: 0

December 20
19:15

(Report)

Fenerbahçe (Turkey)	78–85	(Spain) AXA FC Barcelona
Scoring by quarter: 15-21, 26-22, 15-20, 22-22

Abdi İpekçi Arena, Istanbul
Attendance: 5,000

December 20
20:30

(Report)

Lottomatica Roma (Italy)	69–64	(Spain) Real Madrid
Scoring by quarter: 19-19, 15-13, 15-21, 20-11

PalaLottomatica, Rome
Attendance: 4,000

=== Game 10 ===
January 2–3, 2008

January 2
19:45

(Report)

Panathinaikos (Greece)	67–66	(Serbia) Partizan Belgrade
Scoring by quarter: 16-15, 17-14, 22-14, 12-23

Olympic Indoor Hall, Athens
Attendance: 9,500

January 2
20:30

(Report)

Roanne (France)	79–89	(Spain) AXA FC Barcelona
Scoring by quarter: 20-21, 21-16, 15-25, 23-27

Maison des Sports, Clermont-Ferrand
Attendance: 4,400

January 3
20:30

(Report)

Lottomatica Roma (Italy)	63–84	(Turkey) Fenerbahçe
Scoring by quarter: 18-19, 14-23, 12-17, 19-25

PalaLottomatica, Rome
Attendance: 4,834

January 3
20:45

(Report)

Real Madrid (Spain)	93–57	(Germany) Brose Baskets
Scoring by quarter: 29-12, 25-17, 21-15, 18-13

Palacio Vistalegre, Madrid
Attendance: 13,000

Notes:

- In the Lottomatica-Fenerbahçe game, Fener's Mirsad Türkcan became the first player since the creation of the Euroleague in 2000 to amass 1,000 rebounds in Euroleague play.

=== Game 11 ===
January 9–10, 2008

January 9
19:45

(Report)

Fenerbahçe (Turkey)	81–68	(France) Roanne
Scoring by quarter: 28-13, 16-23, 21-19, 16-13

Abdi İpekçi Arena, Istanbul
Attendance: 2,800

January 9
20:45

(Report)

Brose Baskets (Germany)	59–73	(Italy) Lottomatica Roma
Scoring by quarter: 11-16, 15-16, 13-18, 20-23

Jako Arena, Bamberg
Attendance: 6,800

January 10
20:45

(Report)

Partizan Belgrade (Serbia)	72–80	(Spain) Real Madrid
Scoring by quarter: 17-21, 21-20, 15-20, 19-19

Pionir Hall, Belgrade
Attendance: 6,700

January 10
20:45

(Report)

AXA FC Barcelona (Spain)	55–56	(Greece) Panathinaikos
Scoring by quarter: 15-16, 16-7, 13-21, 11-12

Palau Blaugrana, Barcelona
Attendance: 6,821

=== Game 12 ===
January 16–17, 2008

January 16
20:30

(Report)

Lottomatica Roma (Italy)	88–87 (OT)	(Serbia) Partizan Belgrade
Scoring by quarter: 22-25, 18-11, 25-22, 15-22, Overtime: 8-7

PalaLottomatica, Rome
Attendance: 5,113

January 17
19:45

(Report)

Panathinaikos (Greece)	102–78	(France) Roanne
Scoring by quarter: 29-15, 23-22, 23-14, 27-27

Olympic Indoor Hall, Athens
Attendance: 6,000

January 17
20:45

(Report)

Brose Baskets (Germany)	81–73	(Turkey) Fenerbahçe
Scoring by quarter: 23-12, 15-17, 14-16, 29-28

Jako Arena, Bamberg
Attendance: 6,800

January 17
20:00

(Report)

Real Madrid (Spain)	82–79	(Spain) AXA FC Barcelona
Scoring by quarter: 26-11, 14-24, 16-20, 26-24

Palacio Vistalegre, Madrid
Attendance: 13,000

=== Game 13 ===
January 23–24, 2008

January 23
20:45

(Report)

AXA FC Barcelona (Spain)	75–77	(Italy) Lottomatica Roma
Scoring by quarter: 22-25, 17-10, 17-25, 19-17

Palau Blaugrana, Barcelona
Attendance: 4,223

January 24
19:45

(Report)

Panathinaikos (Greece)	88–68	(Turkey) Fenerbahçe
Scoring by quarter: 16-15, 26-14, 28-18, 18-21

Olympic Indoor Hall, Athens
Attendance: 10,000

January 24
20:30

(Report)

Roanne (France)	68–82	(Spain) Real Madrid
Scoring by quarter: 19-24, 16-15, 17-20, 16-23

Maison des Sports, Clermont-Ferrand
Attendance: 5,000

January 24
20:45

(Report)

Partizan Belgrade (Serbia)	85–37	(Germany) Brose Baskets
Scoring by quarter: 14-10, 28-8, 21-10, 22-9

Pionir Hall, Belgrade
Attendance: 6,573

=== Game 14 ===
January 31, 2008

January 31
20:00

(Report)

Brose Baskets (Germany)	65–69	(Spain) AXA FC Barcelona
Scoring by quarter: 16-21, 15-13, 20-12, 14-23

Jako Arena, Bamberg
Attendance: 6,800

January 31
20:00

(Report)

Real Madrid (Spain)	95–87 (OT)	(Greece) Panathinaikos
Scoring by quarter: 22-24, 31-19, 18-21, 12-19, Overtime: 12-4

Palacio Vistalegre, Madrid
Attendance: 15,000

January 31
20:00

(Report)

Fenerbahçe (Turkey)	86–91	(Serbia) Partizan Belgrade
Scoring by quarter: 27-18, 12-27, 26-22, 21-24

Abdi İpekçi Arena, Istanbul
Attendance: 5,000

January 31
20:00

(Report)

Lottomatica Roma (Italy)	67–74	(France) Roanne
Scoring by quarter: 15-15, 15-20, 16-19, 21-20

PalaLottomatica, Rome
Attendance: 3,884
