= February 2008 in sports =

<<	February 2008					>>
Su	Mo	Tu	We	Th	Fr	Sa
					1	2
3	4	5	6	7	8	9
10	11	12	13	14	15	16
17	18	19	20	21	22	23
24	25	26	27	28	29
Sports

This list shows notable sports-related deaths, events, and notable outcomes that occurred in February of 2008.

== Deaths ==
- 27: Myron Cope
- 25: Ashley Cooper
- 19: Bob Howsam
- 17: Winning Colors

== Current sporting seasons ==
- Auto racing 2008:
  - A1 Grand Prix
  - Sprint Cup
  - Nationwide
  - Craftsman Truck
  - World Rally Championship
  - GP2 Asia Series
  - Rolex Sports Car
- Basketball 2008:
  - Australian National Basketball League
  - British Basketball League
  - EuroCup
  - Euroleague
  - Iranian Super League
  - National Basketball Association
  - Philippine Basketball Association
    - Philippine Cup Finals
  - Russian Basketball Super League
  - Turkish Basketball League
  - ULEB Cup
- Cricket 2007:
  - England
- Cycling
  - UCI ProTour
- Football (soccer) 2007–08:
  - UEFA Champions League
  - UEFA Cup
  - England
  - Italy
  - Germany
  - Spain
  - France
  - Argentina
  - Ecuador
  - Denmark
- Golf 2008:
  - PGA Tour
  - European Tour
  - LPGA Tour
- Ice hockey 2007–08
  - National Hockey League
- Lacrosse 2008
  - National Lacrosse League
- Motorcycle racing 2008:
  - Superbike
- Rugby league
  - Super League
- Rugby union 2007–08:
  - Super 14
  - IRB Sevens
  - Heineken Cup
  - English Premiership
  - Celtic League
  - Top 14

== 29 February 2008 (Friday) ==
- Baseball:
  - A U.S. federal judge in San Francisco orders the unsealing of Barry Bonds' grand jury testimony in a December 2003 hearing on steroids in baseball. Bonds currently faces four counts of perjury and one count of obstruction of justice for allegedly lying 19 times during this testimony. (AP via Yahoo!)
- Cricket:
  - 2007–08 Commonwealth Bank Series
    - 12th match-Sri Lanka 221 (50 ov.) beat Australia 208 (48.1 ov.) by 13 runs.

== 26 February 2008 (Tuesday) ==
- Cricket
  - 2007–08 Commonwealth Bank Series
    - 11th Match-India 180/3 (32.2 ov.) beat Sri Lanka 179 (47.1 ov.) by 7 wickets
- Ice hockey
  - National Hockey League
    - The trade deadline for the 2007–08 season occurs at 3 pm EST, with 25 trades involving 45 players.
- U.S. college basketball:
  - In their first game after reaching No. 1 in both major polls for the first time in school history, Tennessee loses 72–69 to Vanderbilt (#18 AP, No. 14 Coaches) in Nashville. This is the second straight season in which the Commodores have knocked off a top-ranked SEC opponent at home; last year's team knocked off eventual national champion Florida.

== 25 February 2008 (Monday) ==
- Auto racing:
  - NASCAR Sprint Cup Auto Club 500 in Fontana, California

(1) Carl Edwards (Missouri) (2) Jimmie Johnson (California) (3) Jeff Gordon (California)

== 24 February 2008 (Sunday) ==
- Auto racing:
  - 2008 V8 Supercar season: Clipsal 500, at Adelaide Street Circuit, South Australia:
  (1) Jamie Whincup (Australia) (2) Lee Holdsworth (Australia) (3) Cameron McConville (Australia)
  - NASCAR Sprint Cup: The Auto Club 500 in Fontana, California is red-flagged twice due to hazardous conditions from a combination of rain and water seepage at the track, and finally halted after 87 of 250 laps. The race will resume on Monday.
- Football (Soccer):
  - 2008 Football League Cup Final
    - Chelsea 1–2 Tottenham Hotspur (aet)
  - A-League Grand Final 2008
    - Central Coast Mariners 0–1 Newcastle United Jets
  - 2008 Pan-Pacific Championship Finals at Aloha Stadium, Honolulu, Hawaii
    - Final: Houston Dynamo 1 – 6 Gamba Osaka Baré showed dominance over North America's premier league, scoring four goals and carrying the J. League side to the PPC title.
    - Third-Place Game: Los Angeles Galaxy 2 – 1 Sydney FC The Galaxy got revenge on Sydney for their earlier friendly loss, with David Beckham assisting on both L.A. goals.
- Golf:
  - Tiger Woods easily defeats Stewart Cink 8 and 7 in the 36-hole final to win the WGC-Accenture Match Play Championship in Marana, Arizona. The win, his 15th World Golf Championships individual title, makes him the first player ever to hold all three individual WGC titles simultaneously, and also gives him sole possession of fourth place on the PGA Tour's career titles list.

== 23 February 2008 (Saturday) ==
- Motorcycle racing 2008:
  - Superbike: Losail Superbike World Championship round, at Losail International Circuit, Qatar:
  Race 1(1) Troy Bayliss (Australia) (2) Max Biaggi (Italy) (3) Troy Corser (Australia)
  Race 2(1) Fonsi Nieto (Spain) (2) Rubén Xaus (Spain) (3) Max Biaggi (Italy)
- Rugby union: Six Nations
  - Wales 47 – 8 Italy at Millennium Stadium, Cardiff
    - Wales continue their march towards the Grand Slam.
  - Ireland 34 – 13 Scotland at Croke Park, Dublin
    - Ireland score five tries in a fine match.
  - France 13 – 24 England at Stade de France, Saint-Denis
    - England put themselves back into contention for the title, and smash France's 100% record.
- U.S. college basketball:
  - In a showdown between the two top-ranked teams in the country in Memphis, second-ranked Tennessee beats top-ranked Memphis 66–62. The result ends the Tigers' regular-season winning streak at 45 games and their home winning streak at 47, and will almost certainly elevate the Volunteers to No. 1 for the first time in school history.
  - The only other game today to feature two ranked teams, the showpiece of ESPN's annual BracketBusters event, sees Drake (#16 AP, No. 18 Coaches) travel to Indianapolis and surprise Butler (#8 in both polls) 71–64. This is Drake's first win over a top-10 team since 1982.
  - At the other end of the men's Division I spectrum, NJIT loses 76–50 to Utah Valley, completing an 0–29 season. This sets a new Division I record for losses in a winless season.

== 22 February 2008 (Friday) ==
- Auto racing:
  - The two rival top-level American open-wheel racing organizations, the Indy Racing League and Champ Car, agree to merge for the upcoming 2008 season under the IRL banner, with Champ Car agreeing to fold. This ends a bitter feud that started in 1994 when Tony George, the owner of the Indianapolis Motor Speedway, broke from what was then known as CART to eventually form the IRL. (AP via ESPN)
- Basketball
  - U.S. college basketball:
    - Indiana announces that it has reached an agreement with its head coach, Kelvin Sampson, that effectively terminates him after a series of scandals became public during the week. Under terms of the deal, IU will pay Sampson $750,000: in return, he resigns and agrees not to pursue any further legal action. His assistant, Dan Dakich, takes over as interim head coach.
  - Chinese Basketball Association:
    - Guangdong Southern Tigers 90, Liaoning Hunters 81, Guangdong wins series, 4–1.
      - The Southern Tigers clinch their 4th CBA title in 5 years.

== 20 February 2008 (Wednesday) ==
- Football (soccer): 2008 Pan-Pacific Championship Preliminaries at Aloha Stadium, Honolulu, Hawaii
  - Los Angeles Galaxy 0 – 1 Gamba Osaka Baré steals the show from David Beckham, scoring the lone goal and sending the J. League participants to the Final.
  - Houston Dynamo 3 – 0 Sydney FC North Shore native Brian Ching has two assists as the MLS Champions stifle the A-League participants.

== 18 February 2008 (Monday) ==
- Cricket
  - 2008 U/19 Cricket World Cup
    - Group A
      - New Zealand U-19 221/8 (50 ov.) beat Zimbabwe U-19 123 (42.4 ov.) by 98 runs
    - Group B
      - South Africa U-19 223/7 (43.5 ov.) beat West Indies U-19 222/8 (50 ov.) by 3 wickets
    - Group C
      - Sri Lanka U-19 236/9 (50 ov.) beat Nepal U-19 175 (48.5 ov.) by 61 runs
    - Group D
      - Bangladesh U-19 260/8 (50 ov.) beat Bermuda U-19 82 (26.2 ov.) by 178 runs

== 17 February 2008 (Sunday) ==
- Auto racing:
  - NASCAR Sprint Cup Daytona 500 in Daytona Beach, Florida

(1) Ryan Newman (Indiana) (2) Kurt Busch (Nevada) (3) Tony Stewart (Indiana)

- Basketball: NBA All-Star Game
  - East All-Stars 134, West All-Stars 128; LeBron James named game MVP, the second All-Star MVP honor of his career.
- Cricket
  - 2007–08 Commonwealth Bank Series
    - Australia 203/9 (50 ov.) beat India 153 (41.2 ov.) by 50 runs
  - 2008 U/19 Cricket World Cup
    - Group A
      - Pakistan U-19 76/2 (9.3 ov.) beat Malaysia U-19 75 (24.4 ov.) by 8 wickets
    - Group B
      - India U-19 280/5 (50 ov.) beat Papua New Guinea U-19 85 (28 ov.) by 195 runs
    - Group C
      - Australia U-19 312 (48 ov.) beat Namibia U-19 163 (31 ov.) by 149 runs
    - Group D
      - England U-19 110/0 (15.5 ov.) beat Ireland U-19 109 (31.2 ov.) by 10 wickets

== 16 February 2008 (Saturday) ==
- Basketball: NBA All-Star Saturday Night
  - Slam Dunk Contest: Orlando Magic's Dwight Howard defeated Gerald Green of the Minnesota Timberwolves in the final round to win the contest.
    - Other competitors:
      - Rudy Gay (Memphis Grizzlies)
      - Jamario Moon (Toronto Raptors)
  - Three-Point Shootout: Jason Kapono of the Raptors defended his three-point shootout championship as he scored 25 points to tie the record set by Craig Hodges in the 1986 contest.
    - Other competitors:
      - Daniel Gibson (Cleveland Cavaliers)
      - Richard Hamilton (Detroit Pistons)
      - Steve Nash (Phoenix Suns)
      - Dirk Nowitzki (Dallas Mavericks)
      - Peja Stojaković (New Orleans Hornets)
  - Skills Challenge: Deron Williams of the Utah Jazz set a new record with 25.5 seconds beating Chris Paul of the Hornets in the final round.
    - Other competitors
      - Dwyane Wade (Miami Heat)
      - Jason Kidd (New Jersey Nets).
  - Shooting Stars Competition: Team San Antonio (Tim Duncan (Spurs), Becky Hammon (Silver Stars) and David Robinson (Spurs 1989–2003)) topped the field with 35.8 seconds.
    - Other competitors:
      - Team Chicago (Chris Duhon (Bulls), Candice Dupree (Sky) and B. J. Armstrong (Bulls 1989–95, 1999–2000))
      - Team Detroit (Chauncey Billups (Pistons), Swin Cash (Shock) and Bill Laimbeer (Pistons 1981–1994))
      - Team Phoenix (Amar'e Stoudemire (Suns), Cappie Pondexter (Mercury) and Eddie Johnson (Suns 1987–90))
  - Commissioner David Stern says that he expects the Seattle SuperSonics to move to Oklahoma City, either after this season or when the team's lease at KeyArena expires in 2010. He also states that while he is interested in expanding the league to Europe, the league has no plans for such a move at this time, contrary to a report by Sports Illustrated. (AP via ESPN)

== 15 February 2008 (Friday) ==
- Basketball: NBA All-Star Weekend
  - Rookie Challenge: Sophomores 136, Rookies 109; Daniel Gibson was named game MVP.

== 14 February 2008 (Thursday) ==
- Auto racing
  - The 2008 NASCAR Gatorade Duels (qualifying races for the 2008 Daytona 500) are won by Dale Earnhardt Jr. and Denny Hamlin.

== 13 February 2008 (Wednesday) ==
- Basketball:
  - Sports Illustrated, citing an unnamed league source, reports that NBA commissioner David Stern will announce during the upcoming All-Star Weekend that the league plans in the next decade to create a European division with five teams. (SI.com)
- Cycling:
  - The organiser of the Tour de France announces that the Astana Team will be excluded from the 2008 Tour due to the team's past doping issues, including its links to the Operación Puerto case in 2006 and involvement in the Tour's 2007 doping scandals. Among the cyclists barred from the 2008 Tour will be two of the podium finishers from 2007, champion Alberto Contador and third-place Levi Leipheimer. (AP via ESPN)

== 10 February 2008 (Sunday) ==
- American football: Pro Bowl at Honolulu
  - In the final game of the NFL season, the NFC beats the AFC 42–30 behind two touchdowns apiece from Adrian Peterson and Terrell Owens. Peterson is named the game's MVP, becoming only the second rookie (after Marshall Faulk in 1995) so honored.
- Association football: 2008 Africa Cup of Nations:
  - Final: Cameroon 0 – 1 Egypt
    - Egypt win their second successive, and record sixth in total, Africa Cup of Nations title.
- Auto racing:
  - 2008 World Rally Championship: 57th Uddeholm Swedish Rally, in Sweden:
  (1) Jari-Matti Latvala (Finland) (2) Mikko Hirvonen (Finland) (3) Gigi Galli (Italy)
  - Jimmie Johnson won the pole position for the NASCAR Sprint Cup Series Daytona 500.
- Rugby union:
  - Six Nations
    - Italy 19 – 23 England at Stadio Flaminio, Rome
      - England labour to an unconvincing win over Italy.
  - USA Sevens at San Diego
    - Cup: New Zealand 27 – 12 South Africa
      - During their march to the crown, New Zealand set an all-time record with 35 consecutive match wins in the IRB Sevens World Series by defeating Kenya in the Cup semifinals. They took their record to 36 by winning the Cup. They are also the first team ever to win the first four tournaments of an IRB Sevens season.
    - Plate: Fiji 26 – 21 Argentina (extra time)
    - Bowl: United States 19 – 21 Wales
    - Shield: Chile 12 – 24 Australia

== 9 February 2008 (Saturday) ==
- American football: The Washington Redskins hire Jim Zorn as head coach, according to the Associated Press. Zorn is a former Seattle Seahawks quarterback and had served as Seattle's quarterbacks coach for seven years. (AP)
- Association football: 2008 Africa Cup of Nations:
  - Third-place match: Ghana 4 – 2 Ivory Coast
- Rugby union: Six Nations
  - Wales 30 – 15 Scotland at Millennium Stadium, Cardiff
    - As last week, Wales improved strongly as the game proceeded, and are looking for a Grand Slam.
  - France 26 – 21 Ireland at Stade de France, Saint-Denis
    - Ireland struggle to the last second to push to level the game against France, having gone 19 – 6 behind at half time.

== 7 February 2008 (Thursday) ==
- Association football: 2008 Africa Cup of Nations:
  - Semifinal 1: Ghana 0 – 1 Cameroon
    - The Indomitable Lions eject the Black Stars from their own competition, through Alain Nkong's 71st-minute goal, but Lions will be without André Bikey in Sunday's final following his red card.
  - Semifinal 2: Ivory Coast 1 – 4 Egypt
    - In a dramatic match the Pharaohs thrash the favoured Elephants and make their way to the final to defend their title.

== 6 February 2008 (Wednesday) ==
- Basketball: NBA
  - Shaquille O'Neal is traded from the Miami Heat to the Phoenix Suns in exchange for Shawn Marion and Marcus Banks.

== 4 February 2008 (Monday) ==
- Association football: 2008 Africa Cup of Nations:
  - Quarter final 3: Egypt 2 – 1 Angola
  - Quarter final 4: Tunisia 2 – 3 Cameroon (a.e.t., 2–2 after 90 minutes)
- Basketball:
  - Bob Knight, the winningest coach in NCAA men's Division I history with 902 career wins, unexpectedly resigns as head coach at Texas Tech, effective immediately. His son and designated successor, Pat, takes over. (ESPN)

== 3 February 2008 (Sunday) ==
- American football:
  - Super Bowl XLII at Glendale, Arizona: New York Giants 17, New England Patriots 14
    - With a fierce defense led by defensive linemen Michael Strahan and Justin Tuck and a productive final drive fueled by wide receiver David Tyree, the Giants shock the heavily favored and previously unbeaten Patriots and become World Champions. After three quarters dominated by defensive play, New England goes ahead, 14–10, on a Tom Brady touchdown pass to Randy Moss with 2:42 left. The Giants reach striking range on a circus catch by the little-used Tyree, setting up the game-winning touchdown pass from quarterback Eli Manning to a wide-open Plaxico Burress with 35 seconds left in the game. Manning finishes 19-for-34 for 255 yards, two touchdowns and an interception. Even though many observers consider Tuck to be more deserving, Manning is selected Most Valuable Player. With the upset, the 1972 Miami Dolphins remain the only NFL team to complete a season undefeated from opening regular season game to the Super Bowl.
      - With 97.5 million viewers, Super Bowl XLII is the most-watched Super Bowl in history, and the second-most watched television event in American television history.
- Association football: 2008 Africa Cup of Nations:
  - Quarter final 1: Ghana 2 – 1 Nigeria
  - Quarter final 2: Ivory Coast 5 – 0 Guinea
- Auto racing:
  - 2007–08 A1 Grand Prix season: A1 Grand Prix of Nations, Australia, at Eastern Creek Raceway, New South Wales, Australia:
  (1) Adrian Zaugg (South Africa) (2) Neel Jani (Switzerland) (3) Robbie Kerr (United Kingdom)
- Rugby union: Six Nations
  - Scotland 6 – 27 France at Murrayfield, Edinburgh
- Tennis
  - 2008 Movistar Open – Singles final
    - (Chile) Fernando González def. (Argentina) Juan Mónaco; González was handed title by default after Mónaco injured himself.
  - 2008 Movistar Open – Doubles final
    - (Argentina) José Acasuso / (Argentina) Sebastián Prieto def. (Argentina) Máximo González / (Argentina) Juan Mónaco, 6–1, 3–0, ret.

== 2 February 2008 (Saturday) ==
- Rugby union: Six Nations
  - Ireland 16–11 Italy at Croke Park, Dublin
    - Ireland start the competition with a lackluster home win.
  - England 19–26 Wales at Twickenham, London
    - Wales defeat England at Twickenham for the first time since 1988 after England blow a 19–6 lead in the final 25 minutes.
- American football:
  - NFL: 2008 Pro Football Hall of Fame Inductees announced.
  - College football bowl game
    - Texas vs. The Nation Game, El Paso, Texas – Texas 41, The Nation 14
      - In college football's final post-season game, Erick Jackson of the Texas Longhorns returned a 50-yard fumble for a touchdown that helped the Texas squad obtain victory over the Nation all-stars.
- Basketball
  - U.S. college:
    - Memphis 70, UTEP 64 – The No. 1 team in the country survives a scare from the Miners. Chris Douglas-Roberts had 24 points and 7 rebounds, while UTEP star Stefon Jackson had 27 in the loss.
    - Georgetown 73, Seton Hall 61 – The Pirates' five-game winning streak is ended by the No. 6 Hoyas. Jessie Sapp led the team with 17 points.

== 1 February 2008 (Friday) ==
- Basketball: NBA
  - Pau Gasol is traded from the Memphis Grizzlies to the Los Angeles Lakers. (AFP)
