= Miha Zupan =

Slovenian basketball player

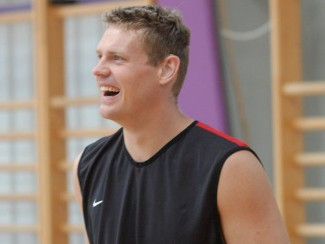

Personal information
- Born: September 13, 1982 (age 44) Kranj, SR Slovenia, SFR Yugoslavia
- Listed height: 6 ft 8.75 in (2.05 m)
- Listed weight: 250 lb (113 kg)

Career information
- NBA draft: 2004: undrafted
- Playing career: 2000–2020
- Position: Power forward / center

Career history
- 2000–2006: Slovan Ljubljana
- 2006–2009: Union Olimpija
- 2009–2010: Trikala 2000
- 2010–2012: Spartak St. Petersburg
- 2012–2013: Türk Telekom
- 2013–2015: Uşak Sportif
- 2016: CSM Oradea
- 2016–2017: Afyonkarahisar Belediyespor
- 2017: Helios Suns
- 2018: Naft Abadan
- 2019–2020: Slovan Ljubljana

Career highlights
- 2× Slovenian League champion (2008, 2009); 2× Slovenian Cup winner (2008, 2009); Russian Cup winner (2011)
Medals
Representing Slovenia
Men's basketball
Deaflympics
Silver medal – second place	Rome 2001	team
Silver medal – second place	Melbourne 2005	team

Miha Zupan (born September 13, 1982) is a Deaf Slovenian former professional basketball player. He played among hearing players at the highest level in Europe. He is a 2.05 m (6 ft 8 3/4 in) power forward who can also play center when needed. He is the only deaf person to play in a professional basketball league and in the EuroCup. Miha Zupan has competed at the Deaflympics on 5 occasions from 1997 to 2017.

== Early years ==
Zupan spent most of his childhood in a school for the deaf, eventually learning to speak. A type of hearing aid would later give him enough hearing to understand speech. He did not learn to play basketball until age 14, instead playing football and volleyball. After his first basketball coach spotted him in a schoolyard, he took to the game quickly, soon joining Slovenia's national basketball team for the Deaf, which twice made the finals of the European championships with Zupan as its star. He was selected to represent Slovenia at the Deaflympics in 1997 and competed in his maiden Deaflympic competition at the age of 15. He was part of the Slovenian Deaf basketball team which finished 5th in the 1997 Summer Deaflympics. At the age of 17, he signed his first contract with a regular professional team, KD Slovan of Ljubljana. During his teenage years, he grew 20 cm (8 inches) in an 18-month period, leading to knee problems that sidelined him for several months early in his pro career.

== Professional career ==
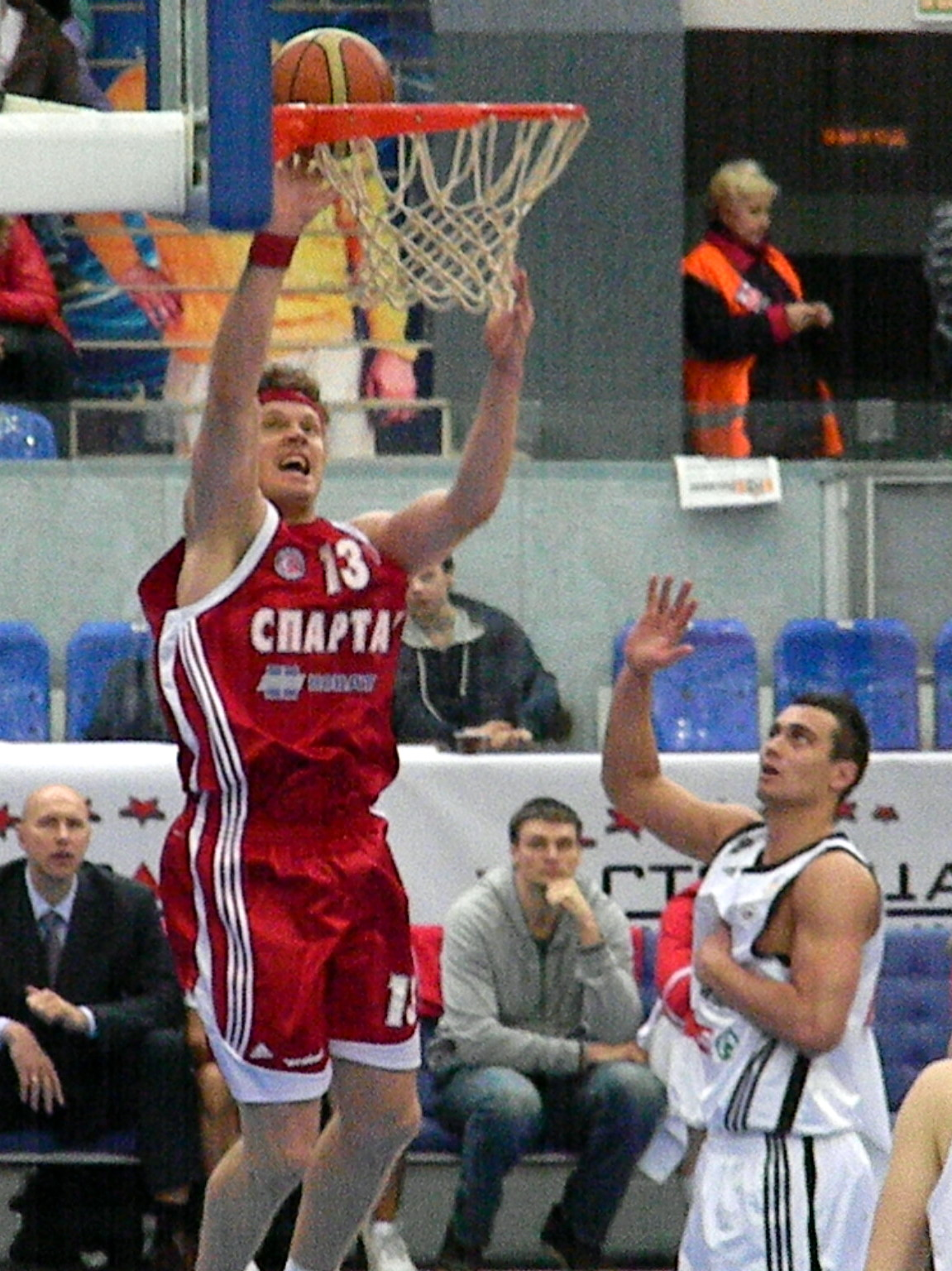
Miha Zupan with Spartak Saint Petersburg

At Slovan he developed into a promising big man, soon making the (regular) Slovenia junior and under-20 national teams. He played in the Slovenian League All-Star Game in 2004 and 2006, earning MVP honors in the 2004 game and also winning the slam dunk contest associated with the 2004 game. He continued to play for the Slovenia national deaf team, leading them to the 2004 European championship.

He was also the member of the national basketball team which claimed silver medals at the 2001 Summer Deaflympics and at the 2005 Summer Deaflympics.

In the 2005–06 season with Slovan, he averaged 11.5 points and 4.4 rebounds in Slovenian League play. His statistics in the Adriatic League were arguably more impressive, considering that he played only 23 minutes per game in that competition; he averaged 13.2 points and 3.9 rebounds and also shot 47.3% from three-point range.

Zupan signed with Union Olimpija, also of Ljubljana, in the 2006 offseason, fulfilling what he called one of his lifelong dreams. He also barely missed out on a trip to the 2006 FIBA World Championship, becoming the last player cut from the Slovenia squad. His chance to play for Olimpija in the Euroleague was on hold for several months because his transfer became the subject of litigation between them and Slovan. He had, apparently inadvertently, failed to revoke his contract with Slovan before signing with Olimpija. Olimpija had registered him at the start of the 2006–07 season, and he played six fixtures in the Adriatic League before Slovan contested the registration. Olimpija won the first round of the legal battle in August 2006, but on October 23, an appellate court set aside the decision and ordered a new trial. Olimpija announced that it would appeal the ruling. This ruling also, for the time being, prevented him from becoming the first deaf player ever to play in the Euroleague, as he had been scheduled to play in Olimpija's first game of Euroleague regular-season play against Croatian side Cibona on October 26, 2006.

The legal battle raged until late February 2007, when Olimpija and Slovan reached a settlement. After Olimpija paid an undisclosed fee to Slovan, they finally registered him officially on March 1. The settlement proved timely for Olimpija, as they had seen six players leave the team during the season, and had two other players out with injury. While Zupan was unable to play during the 2006-07 Euroleague, as Olimpija had been eliminated by the time of the settlement, he arrived in time for the late rounds of the Adriatic League and for the second stage of the Slovenian domestic league.

On October 24, 2007, Zupan finally became the first deaf player in the Euroleague, appearing for Olimpija in their 80–52 loss at Montepaschi Siena in the opening week of regular season play in the 2007-08 Euroleague. He had 5 points, 3 rebounds, and 2 assists in slightly over 13 minutes of action off the bench.

In August 2009, he joined the Greek League club Trikala 2000.

In July 2010 he signed a two-year deal with Spartak SPB in Russia. In the same year, he was awarded the ICSD Deaf Sportsman of the Year by the International Committee of Sports for the Deaf as he topped the list with 60 points.

In August 2012, he signed a one-year contract with Turk Telekom.

On January 1, 2016, he signed with Liga Nationala team CSM Oradea.

On July 31, 2017, Zupan signed with Helios Suns. After four games he parted ways with Helios Suns on October 28, 2017.

On January 13, 2018, he signed with Iranian Super League club Naft Abadan.

== See also ==
- Lance Allred, a deaf American basketball player who also plays professionally alongside hearing people
