= Zimbabwean cricket team in Pakistan in 2007–08 =

International cricket tour

	Pakistan	Zimbabwe
- Dates: 14 January – 2 February 2008
Captains	Shoaib Malik	Prosper Utseya

One Day International series
- Results: Pakistan won the 5-match series 5–0
Most runs	Mohammad Yousuf (223)	Sean Williams (192)
Most wickets	Shoaib Malik (11)	Ray Price (5)
- Player of the series: Shoaib Malik (Pak)

The Zimbabwean cricket team began touring Pakistan for five One Day Internationals and a four-day tour match on 14 January. Pakistan began the tour after suffering One Day series defeats at the hands of both India and South Africa while Zimbabwe had lost a home series to West Indies prior to their arrival.

Zimbabwe named the same squad that lost 3–1 to the West Indies while Pakistan named uncapped Nasir Jamshed, Samiullah Khan and Kamran Hussain in their squad. Over the course of the series, they called up a number of uncapped and inexperienced players, including Abdur Rauf, Wahab Riaz, and Khurram Manzoor.

== Squads ==
ODIs
Pakistan	Zimbabwe
Shoaib Malik (c); Shahid Afridi; Sarfaraz Ahmed (wk); Rizwan Ahmed; Kamran Akmal (wk); Fawad Alam; Iftikhar Anjum; Yasir Arafat; Salman Butt; Kamran Hussain; Nasir Jamshed; Khaild Latif; Khurram Manzoor; Misbah-ul-Haq; Naumanullah; Wahab Riaz; Abdur Rauf; Samiullah Khan; Sohail Khan; Sohail Tanvir; Younis Khan; Mohammad Yousuf; Junaid Zia	Prosper Utseya (c); Tatenda Taibu(wk); Brendan Taylor (wk); Gary Brent; Chamu Chibhabha; Elton Chigumbura; Graeme Cremer; Keith Dabengwa; Timycen Maruma; Hamilton Masakadza; Stuart Matsikenyeri; Christopher Mpofu; Tawanda Mupariwa; Ray Price; Vusi Sibanda; Sean Williams

Khalid Latif and Sohail Khan replaced Samiullah Khan and Sarfaraz Ahmed in Pakistan's squad before the 3rd ODI. For the 4th ODI, Khurram Manzoor and Wahab Riaz were included in Pakistan's squad, replacing Salman Butt and Yasir Arafat, while, Iftikhar Anjum and Kamran Akmal were given rest, and Sarfaraz Ahmed replaced Kamran Akmal as wicket-keeper for the remaining two ODIs.Shahid Afridi and Mohammad Yousuf both were rested for the 5th ODI and Rizwan Ahmed, Abdur Rauf, Naumanullah and Junaid Zia all were included in the squad.

== Tour match ==
=== First-class: Pakistan Cricket Board Patron's XI vs Zimbabweans ===
14–17 January
Scorecard

Zimbabweans	v	(Pakistan) PCB Patron's XI
209 (69.1 overs); Brendan Taylor 64 (128); Shahid Afridi 4/37 (16 overs)		479/6d (136 overs); Nasir Jamshed 182 (240); Ray Price 4/130 (35 overs)
236 (109 overs); Timycen Maruma 71 (101); Samiullah Khan 5/42 (24 overs)

PCB Patron's XI won by an innings and 34 runs
Defence Housing Authority Stadium, Karachi
Umpires: Ahmed Shahab (Pak) and Riazuddin (Pak)

- Zimbabwe won the toss and elected to bat.

== ODI series ==
=== 1st ODI ===
21 January
Scorecard

Pakistan; 347/5 (50 overs)	v	Zimbabwe; 243/7 (50 overs)
Younis Khan 79 (68); Ray Price 2/61 (10 overs)		Vusi Sibanda 59 (54); Shoaib Malik 3/34 (10 overs)

Pakistan won by 104 runs
National Stadium, Karachi
Umpires: EAR De Silva (SL) and Zameer Haider (Pak)
Player of the match: Nasir Jamshed (Pak)

- Zimbabwe won the toss and elected to field.
- Nasir Jamshed and Samiullah Khan (Pak) both made their ODI debuts.

Pakistan cruised to a facile victory on a batsman-friendly pitch in Karachi as five men, including debutant Nasir Jamshed scored half-centuries. Younus Khan, Mohammad Yousuf, Shoaib Malik and Misbah-ul-Haq were the other four with Younus top scoring with 79 as Pakistan posted a huge 347 for five from their overs. The Zimbabwe run chase got off to a bright start despite the early loss of Hamilton Masakadza as Vusi Sibanda and Chamu Chibhabha also passed fifty, adding 56 runs for the second wicket. Pakistan hit back with regular wickets, spinners Shoaib Malik and Shahid Afridi picking up five before them, slowing the Zimbabweans down and despite a late blast of 52 from Sean Williams, they were untroubled on their way to victory. Nasir was named man of the match for his 48-ball innings of 61 that included six fours and three sixes.

=== 2nd ODI ===
24 January
Scorecard

Zimbabwe; 238/8 (50 overs)	v	Pakistan; 239/5 (46.2 overs)
Hamilton Masakadza 87 (103); Sohail Tanvir 4/34 (10 overs)		Nasir Jamshed 74 (64); Ray Price 1/21 (10 overs)

Pakistan won by 5 wickets
Niaz Stadium, Hyderabad
Umpires: EAR De Silva (SL) and Nadeem Ghauri (Pak)
Player of the match: Sohail Tanvir (Pak)

- Zimbabwe won the toss and elected to bat.

Pakistan eased into a 2–0 series lead with Nasir Jamshed and Sohail Tanvir playing starring roles in Hyderabad. Batting first, Hamilton Masakadza and Tatenda Taibu, with 81, top scored for Zimbabwe but no other batsman could make a significant contribution, as Tanvir took career-best figures of four for 34, rendering their final score of 238 a modest one, at best. Jamshed, in only his second match, then smashed fifty from 43 balls, before he was eventually run out for 74 to put Zimbabwe on the back foot. They rallied, taking four more wickets, but a circumspect knock of 38 not out from Mohammad Yousuf and a belligerent 43 off 21 balls from Shahid Afridi ensured Pakistan made their target with 22 balls to spare.

=== 3rd ODI ===
27 January
Scorecard

Pakistan; 272/9 (50 overs)	v	Zimbabwe; 235/7 (50 overs)
Shahid Afridi 85 (52); Tawanda Mupariwa 4/46 (10 overs)		Sean Williams 71 (101); Sohail Tanvir 2/41 (10 overs)

Pakistan won by 37 runs
Multan Cricket Stadium, Multan
Umpires: EAR De Silva (SL) and Nadeem Ghauri (Pak)
Player of the match: Shahid Afridi (Pak)

- Pakistan won the toss and elected to bat.
- Kamran Hussain (Pak) made his ODI debut.

Pakistan were given a scare by Zimbabwe, for whom Tawanda Mupariwa took four top order wickets before Shahid Afridi with a characteristic innings of 85 from 52 balls helped Pakistan blast their way to 272 for nine from their 50 overs. It was by no means a commanding score, and when Sean Williams (71) and Brendan Taylor (55) were batting together, it looked like a shock was on the cards. However, once those two fell within 11 runs of each other, Pakistan regained control of the match and closed out a 37-run win that sealed the series.

=== 4th ODI ===
30 January
Scorecard

Zimbabwe; 244 (49.5 overs)	v	Pakistan; 245/3 (47 overs)
Tatenda Taibu 51 (76); Shoaib Malik 3/55 (9.5 overs)		Mohammad Yousuf 108* (111); Christopher Mpofu 1/36 (10 overs)

Pakistan won by 7 wickets
Iqbal Stadium, Faisalabad
Umpires: Aleem Dar (Pak) and EAR de Silva (SL)
Player of the match: Shoaib Malik (Pak)

- Zimbabwe won the toss and elected to bat.
- Khalid Latif and Sohail Khan (Pak) both made their ODI debuts.

A Mohammad Yousuf century helped Pakistan into a 4–0 series lead after Zimbabwe had rallied to post a score of 244 in Faisalabad. Tatenda Taibu hit 51 and Sean Williams 48 before Shoaib Malik had both caught and bowled after they had shared a half-century stand. The innings stuttered before a late blast of 45 from 33 balls from Keith Dabengwa saw them get to their score of 244, bowled out in the final over. Pakistan lost their openers relatively quickly before a stand of 141 between Yousuf and Malik, who was run out for 88, ended any hopes Zimbabwe had of winning the game. Yousuf ended unbeaten on 108 not out with Malik awarded the man of the match having already taken three for 55.

=== 5th ODI ===
2 February
Scorecard

Zimbabwe; 183 (45.4 overs)	v	Pakistan; 187/3 (31 overs)
Brendan Taylor 49 (78); Abdur Rauf 3/45 (8.4 overs)		Younis Khan 63 (51); Ray Price 2/38 (10 overs)

Pakistan won by 7 wickets
Sheikhupura Stadium, Sheikhupura
Umpires: Aleem Dar (Pak) and EAR de Silva (SL)
Player of the match: Younis Khan (Pak)

- Zimbabwe won the toss and elected to bat.
- Abdur Rauf, Khurram Manzoor, Rizwan Ahmed and Wahab Riaz (Pak) all made their ODI debuts.

Pakistan cruised to a 5–0 series clean sweep with debutants Abdur Rauf, Wahab Riaz and Khurram Manzoor playing starring roles. Brendan Taylor hit 50 for Zimbabwe, who won the toss and chose to bat, but they were undone by five wickets by Rauf and Riaz with captain Shoaib Malik chipping in with two, one of which Taylor immediately after he had reached a half-century. Zimbabwe were bowled out for a modest 183 in the 46th over. Nasir Jamshed fell early, but 50 runs on his debut from Manzoor and 63 from Younis Khan ensured Pakistan had no problem reaching their target, which they eventually did after 31 overs with Misbah-ul-Haq hitting a six to win the game.
