= 2007–08 Euroleague Regular Season Group A =

Standings and results for Group A of the regular season phase of the 2007–08 Euroleague basketball tournament.

Main page: 2007–08 Euroleague

Key to colors
| Top five places in each group, plus highest-ranked sixth-place team, advance to Top 16 |
| Eliminated |

== Standings ==
| | Team | Pld | W | L | PF | PA | Diff |
|---|---|---|---|---|---|---|---|
| 1. | (Russia) CSKA Moscow | 14 | 12 | 2 | 1123 | 942 | +181 |
| 2. | (Italy) Montepaschi Siena | 14 | 10 | 4 | 1098 | 974 | +124 |
| 3. | (Spain) TAU Cerámica | 14 | 9 | 5 | 1170 | 1051 | +119 |
| 4. | (Lithuania) Žalgiris Kaunas | 14 | 8 | 6 | 1110 | 1126 | −16 |
| 5. | (Greece) Olympiacos | 14 | 7 | 7 | 1185 | 1099 | +86 |
| 6. | (Slovenia) Olimpija Ljubljana | 14 | 4 | 10 | 1030 | 1147 | −117 |
| 7. | (Poland) Prokom Trefl Sopot | 14 | 4 | 10 | 973 | 1143 | −170 |
| 8. | (Italy) VidiVici Bologna | 14 | 2 | 12 | 1008 | 1215 | −207 |

== Fixtures and results ==
All times given below are in Central European Time.

=== Game 1 ===
October 22–25, 2007

October 22
20:15

(Report)

| Prokom Trefl Sopot (Poland) | 69–88 | (Russia) CSKA Moscow |
Scoring by quarter: 16-13, 16-32, 18-24, 19-19

Hala Olivia, Gdańsk
Attendance: 5,000

October 24
20:30

(Report)

| Montepaschi Siena (Italy) | 80–52 | (Slovenia) Olimpija Ljubljana |
Scoring by quarter: 20-18, 30-8, 9-15, 21-11

Palasport Mens Sana, Siena
Attendance: 4,000

October 24
20:30

(Report)

| VidiVici Bologna (Italy) | 81–75 | (Lithuania) Žalgiris Kaunas |
Scoring by quarter: 19-21, 18-18, 20-22, 24-14

PalaMalaguti, Bologna
Attendance: 5,000

October 25
20:30

(Report)

| Olympiacos (Greece) | 95–90 | (Spain) TAU Cerámica |
Scoring by quarter: 26-20, 29-17, 15-28, 25-25

Peace and Friendship Stadium, Athens
Attendance: 9,000

Notes:

- The Montepaschi-Olimpija match saw Olimpija's Miha Zupan become the first deaf player ever in the Euroleague.

=== Game 2 ===
October 31 – November 1, 2007

October 31
18:15

(Report)

| CSKA Moscow (Russia) | 74–70 | (Italy) Montepaschi Siena |
Scoring by quarter: 20-18, 16-15, 24-19, 14-18

CSKA Universal Sports Hall, Moscow
Attendance: 4,500

October 31
19:15

(Report)

| Žalgiris Kaunas (Lithuania) | 82–72 | (Poland) Prokom Trefl Sopot |
Scoring by quarter: 16-31, 19-11, 21-8, 26-22

Kaunas Sports Hall, Kaunas
Attendance: 5,000

November 1
20:30

(Report)

| TAU Cerámica (Spain) | 98–71 | (Italy) VidiVici Bologna |
Scoring by quarter: 26-19, 23-15, 29-13, 20-24

Fernando Buesa Arena, Vitoria-Gasteiz
Attendance: 8,400

November 1
20:45

(Report)

| Olimpija Ljubljana (Slovenia) | 87–78 | (Greece) Olympiacos |
Scoring by quarter: 14-21, 23-13, 19-19, 31-25

Dvorana Tivoli, Ljubljana
Attendance: 5,500

=== Game 3 ===
November 7–8, 2007

November 7
20:30

(Report)

| Montepaschi Siena (Italy) | 89–64 | (Lithuania) Žalgiris Kaunas |
Scoring by quarter: 21-10, 22-19, 23-26, 22-9

Palasport Mens Sana, Siena
Attendance: 4,600

November 7
20:45

(Report)

| Olimpija Ljubljana (Slovenia) | 74–72 | (Russia) CSKA Moscow |
Scoring by quarter: 23-22, 17-21, 14-12, 20-17

Dvorana Tivoli, Ljubljana
Attendance: 5,500

November 8
19:45

(Report)

| Prokom Trefl Sopot (Poland) | 66–82 | (Spain) TAU Cerámica |
Scoring by quarter: 19-21, 17-23, 6-25, 24-13

Hala Olivia, Gdańsk
Attendance: 5000

November 8
20:30

(Report)

| Olympiacos (Greece) | 104–76 | (Italy) VidiVici Bologna |
Scoring by quarter: 22-11, 24-25, 32-26, 26-14

Peace and Friendship Stadium, Athens
Attendance: 6,000

=== Game 4 ===
November 14–15, 2007

November 14
18:15

(Report)

| CSKA Moscow (Russia) | 88–79 | (Greece) Olympiacos |
Scoring by quarter: 22-23, 23-17, 16-22, 27-17

CSKA Universal Sports Hall, Moscow
Attendance: 5,000

November 14
20:30

(Report)

| VidiVici Bologna (Italy) | 75–87 | (Poland) Prokom Trefl Sopot |
Scoring by quarter: 10-17, 21-27, 16-19, 28-24

PalaMalaguti, Bologna
Attendance: 3000

November 15
19:15

(Report)

| Žalgiris Kaunas (Lithuania) | 91–72 | (Slovenia) Olimpija Ljubljana |
Scoring by quarter: 25-22, 29-20, 16-17, 21-13

Kaunas Sports Hall, Kaunas
Attendance: 4,671

November 15
20:30

(Report)

| TAU Cerámica (Spain) | 76–61 | (Italy) Montepaschi Siena |
Scoring by quarter: 21-13, 17-17, 15-16, 23-15

Fernando Buesa Arena, Vitoria-Gasteiz
Attendance: 8,400

=== Game 5 ===
November 21, 2007

November 21
18:15

(Report)

| CSKA Moscow (Russia) | 78–70 | (Lithuania) Žalgiris Kaunas |
Scoring by quarter: 25-20, 18-16, 19-21, 16-13

CSKA Universal Sports Hall, Moscow
Attendance: 5,000

November 21
19:45

(Report)

| Olympiacos (Greece) | 109–65 | (Poland) Prokom Trefl Sopot |
Scoring by quarter: 31-14, 21-16, 34-14, 23-21

Peace and Friendship Stadium, Athens
Attendance: 4,500

November 21
20:30

(Report)

| Montepaschi Siena (Italy) | 80–69 | (Italy) VidiVici Bologna |
Scoring by quarter: 16-12, 24-21, 13-24, 27-12

Palasport Mens Sana, Siena
Attendance: 5161

November 21
20:45

(Report)

| Olimpija Ljubljana (Slovenia) | 78–92 | (Spain) TAU Cerámica |
Scoring by quarter: 16-30, 15-21, 22-19, 25-22

Dvorana Tivoli, Ljubljana
Attendance: 5,500

=== Game 6 ===
November 28–29, 2007

November 28
19:45

(Report)

| Prokom Trefl Sopot (Poland) | 59–84 | (Italy) Montepaschi Siena |
Scoring by quarter: 12-22, 9-21, 20-23, 18-18

Hala Olivia, Gdańsk
Attendance: 3,000

November 29
19:45

(Report)

| Olympiacos (Greece) | 90–74 | (Lithuania) Žalgiris Kaunas |
Scoring by quarter: 26-20, 23-27, 21-14, 20-13

Peace and Friendship Stadium, Athens
Attendance: 5,500

November 29
20:00

(Report)

| TAU Cerámica (Spain) | 76–85 | (Russia) CSKA Moscow |
Scoring by quarter: 13-25, 22-19, 18-22, 23-19

Fernando Buesa Arena, Vitoria-Gasteiz
Attendance: 9,600

November 29
20:30

(Report)

| VidiVici Bologna (Italy) | 101–91 | (Slovenia) Olimpija Ljubljana |
Scoring by quarter: 21-20, 20-23, 31-10, 29-38

PalaMalaguti, Bologna
Attendance: 4,110

=== Game 7 ===
December 5–6, 2007

December 5
18:15

(Report)

| CSKA Moscow (Russia) | 79–53 | (Italy) VidiVici Bologna |
Scoring by quarter: 26-18, 13-15, 18-13, 22-7

CSKA Universal Sports Hall, Moscow
Attendance: 4,000

December 5
20:30

(Report)

| Montepaschi Siena (Italy) | 86–84 | (Greece) Olympiacos |
Scoring by quarter: 20-19, 21-20, 19-24, 26-21

Palasport Mens Sana, Siena
Attendance: 5,030

December 6
19:15

(Report)

| Žalgiris Kaunas (Lithuania) | 95–92 | (Spain) TAU Cerámica |
Scoring by quarter: 19-23, 27-25, 18-15, 31-29

Kaunas Sports Hall, Kaunas
Attendance: 5,000

December 6
20:45

(Report)

| Olimpija Ljubljana (Slovenia) | 68–49 | (Poland) Prokom Trefl Sopot |
Scoring by quarter: 13-15, 22-11, 14-15, 19-8

Dvorana Tivoli, Ljubljana
Attendance: 5,000

=== Game 8 ===
December 12–13, 2007

December 12
20:15

(Report)

| CSKA Moscow (Russia) | 99–67 | (Poland) Prokom Trefl Sopot |
Scoring by quarter: 21-13, 27-21, 25-17, 26-16

CSKA Universal Sports Hall, Moscow
Attendance: 3,500

December 12
20:30

(Report)

| TAU Cerámica (Spain) | 75–64 | (Greece) Olympiacos |
Scoring by quarter: 25-14, 11-24, 21-21, 18-5

Fernando Buesa Arena, Vitoria-Gasteiz
Attendance: 8,300

December 13
19:15

(Report)

| Žalgiris Kaunas (Lithuania) | 102–82 | (Italy) VidiVici Bologna |
Scoring by quarter: 30-17, 21-15, 32-18, 19-32

Kaunas Sports Hall, Kaunas
Attendance: 5,000

December 13
20:45

(Report)

| Olimpija Ljubljana (Slovenia) | 80–86 | (Italy) Montepaschi Siena |
Scoring by quarter: 22-21, 17-15, 21-19, 20-31

Dvorana Tivoli, Ljubljana
Attendance: 5,500

=== Game 9 ===
December 19–20, 2007

December 19
19:45

(Report)

| Olympiacos (Greece) | 113–80 | (Slovenia) Olimpija Ljubljana |
Scoring by quarter: 28-17, 25-26, 25-18, 35-19

Peace and Friendship Stadium, Athens
Attendance: 6,000

December 19
19:45

(Report)

| Prokom Trefl Sopot (Poland) | 80–85 | (Lithuania) Žalgiris Kaunas |
Scoring by quarter: 22-10, 18-25, 13-28, 27-22

Hala Stulecia Sopotu, Sopot
Attendance: 2,000

December 19
20:30

(Report)

| Montepaschi Siena (Italy) | 66–69 | (Russia) CSKA Moscow |
Scoring by quarter: 21-21, 22-12, 14-23, 9-13

Palasport Mens Sana, Siena
Attendance: 6,500

December 20
20:30

(Report)

| VidiVici Bologna (Italy) | 69–85 | (Spain) TAU Cerámica |
Scoring by quarter: 17-26, 17-17, 21-24, 14-18

PalaMalaguti, Bologna
Attendance: 3,610

=== Game 10 ===
January 2–3, 2008

January 2
18:15

(Report)

| CSKA Moscow (Russia) | 74–57 | (Slovenia) Olimpija Ljubljana |
Scoring by quarter: 13-13, 21-15, 20-13, 20-16

CSKA Universal Sports Hall, Moscow
Attendance: 4,500

January 3
19:45

(Report)

| Žalgiris Kaunas (Lithuania) | 75–69 | (Italy) Montepaschi Siena |
Scoring by quarter: 18-11, 21-22, 16-21, 20-15

Kaunas Sports Hall, Kaunas
Attendance: 5,000

January 3
20:30

(Report)

| TAU Cerámica (Spain) | 98–74 | (Poland) Prokom Trefl Sopot |
Scoring by quarter: 28-24, 33-16, 18-7, 19-27

Fernando Buesa Arena, Vitoria-Gasteiz
Attendance: 7,600

January 3
20:30

(Report)

| VidiVici Bologna (Italy) | 80–91 | (Greece) Olympiacos |
Scoring by quarter: 20-25, 20-25, 19-21, 21-20

PalaMalaguti, Bologna
Attendance: 3,765

=== Game 11 ===
January 9–10, 2008

January 9
20:30

| Montepaschi Siena (Italy) | 83–71 | (Spain) TAU Cerámica |
Scoring by quarter: 28-23, 11-10, 21-16, 23-22

Palasport Mens Sana, Siena
Attendance: 5,319

January 10
19:45

(Report)

| Prokom Trefl Sopot (Poland) | 79–59 | (Italy) VidiVici Bologna |
Scoring by quarter: 20-16, 19-20, 19-15, 21-8

Hala Stulecia Sopotu, Sopot
Attendance: 2,000

January 10
20:30

(Report)

| Olympiacos (Greece) | 71–67 | (Russia) CSKA Moscow |
Scoring by quarter: 15-15, 24-18, 19-18, 13-16

Peace and Friendship Stadium, Athens
Attendance: 10000

January 10
20:45

(Report)

| Olimpija Ljubljana (Slovenia) | 74–83 | (Lithuania) Žalgiris Kaunas |
Scoring by quarter: 9-18, 21-16, 12-15, 32-34

Dvorana Tivoli, Ljubljana
Attendance: 5,500

=== Game 12 ===
January 17, 2008

January 17
19:15

(Report)

| Žalgiris Kaunas (Lithuania) | 60–88 | (Russia) CSKA Moscow |
Scoring by quarter: 16-26, 14-20, 16-20, 14-22

Kaunas Sports Hall, Kaunas
Attendance: 5,000

January 17
19:45

(Report)

| Prokom Trefl Sopot (Poland) | 63–59 | (Greece) Olympiacos |
Scoring by quarter: 14-14, 15-15, 11-15, 23-15

Hala Stulecia Sopotu, Sopot
Attendance: 2,200

January 17
20:30

(Report)

| VidiVici Bologna (Italy) | 64–77 | (Italy) Montepaschi Siena |
Scoring by quarter: 12-30, 22-13, 19-14, 11-20

PalaMalaguti, Bologna
Attendance: 3,765

January 17
20:30

(Report)

| TAU Cerámica (Spain) | 89–74 | (Slovenia) Olimpija Ljubljana |
Scoring by quarter: 25-21, 27-12, 21-26, 16-15

Fernando Buesa Arena, Vitoria-Gasteiz
Attendance: 7,400

=== Game 13 ===
January 23–24, 2008

January 23
18:15

(Report)

| CSKA Moscow (Russia) | 70–62 | (Spain) TAU Cerámica |
Scoring by quarter: 19-16, 15-13, 22-13, 14-20

Khodynka Arena, Moscow
Attendance: 13,000

January 23
20:30

(Report)

| Montepaschi Siena (Italy) | 87–64 | (Poland) Prokom Trefl Sopot |
Scoring by quarter: 22-8, 21-15, 20-17, 24-24

Palasport Mens Sana, Siena
Attendance: 4254

January 24
19:15

(Report)

| Žalgiris Kaunas (Lithuania) | 88–75 | (Greece) Olympiacos |
Scoring by quarter: 21-14, 21-18, 25-22, 21-21

Kaunas Sports Hall, Kaunas
Attendance: 5,000

January 24
20:45

(Report)

| Olimpija Ljubljana (Slovenia) | 75–60 | (Italy) VidiVici Bologna |
Scoring by quarter: 19-13, 24-19, 15-15, 17-13

Dvorana Tivoli, Ljubljana
Attendance: 4,000

=== Game 14 ===
January 30, 2008

January 30
20:30

(Report)

| VidiVici Bologna (Italy) | 68–92 | (Russia) CSKA Moscow |
Scoring by quarter: 5-24, 19-27, 24-21, 20-20

PalaMalaguti, Bologna
Attendance: 4,256

January 30
20:30

(Report)

| Prokom Trefl Sopot (Poland) | 79–68 | (Slovenia) Olimpija Ljubljana |
Scoring by quarter: 15-17, 23-15, 21-18, 20-18

Hala Stulecia Sopotu, Sopot
Attendance: 2,200

January 30
20:30

(Report)

| Olympiacos (Greece) | 73–80 | (Italy) Montepaschi Siena |
Scoring by quarter: 15-18, 16-23, 20-11, 22-28

Peace and Friendship Stadium, Athens
Attendance: 3,000

January 30
20:30

(Report)

| TAU Cerámica (Spain) | 84–66 | (Lithuania) Žalgiris Kaunas |
Scoring by quarter: 16-24, 28-15, 21-18, 19-9

Fernando Buesa Arena, Vitoria-Gasteiz
Attendance: 8,400
