= 2007–08 Euroleague Regular Season Group B =

Standings and results for Group B of the regular season phase of the 2007–08 Euroleague basketball tournament.

Main page: 2007–08 Euroleague

Key to colors
Top five places in each group, plus highest-ranked sixth-place team, advance to Top 16
Eliminated

== Standings ==
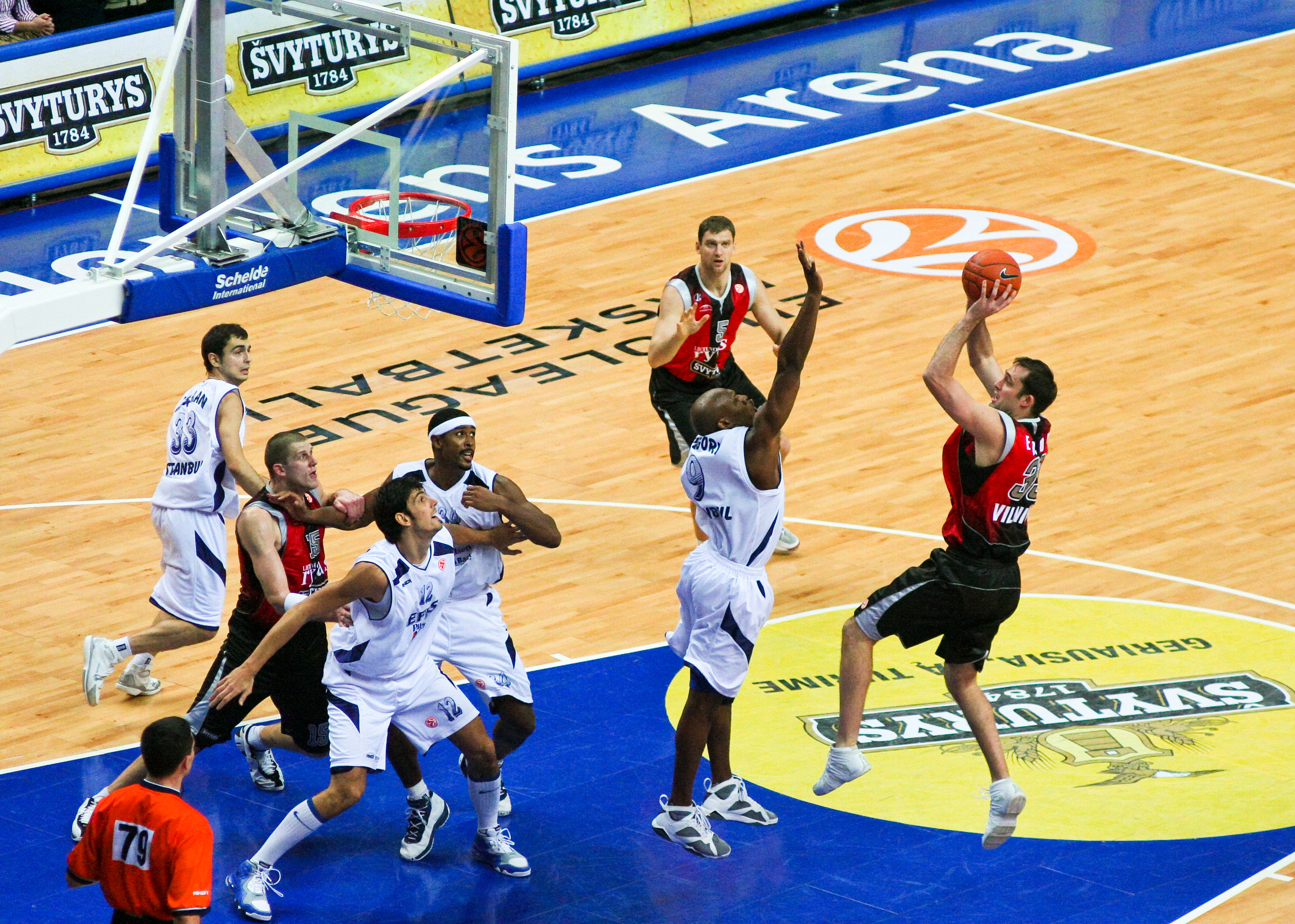
The Euroleague fixture between Efes Pilsen S.K. and BC Lietuvos Rytas

	Team	Pld	W	L	PF	PA	Diff
1.	(Lithuania) Lietuvos Rytas Vilnius	14	11	3	1127	999	+128
2.	(Israel) Maccabi Tel Aviv	14	11	3	1162	1108	+54
3.	(Spain) Unicaja Málaga	14	10	4	1124	1007	+117
4.	(Turkey) Efes Pilsen	14	8	6	1106	1080	+26
5.	(Greece) Aris Thessaloniki	14	7	7	1054	1072	−18
6.	(Croatia) Cibona Zagreb	14	4	10	1080	1188	−108
7.	(Italy) Armani Jeans Milano	14	3	11	1015	1107	−92
8.	(France) Le Mans	14	2	12	1035	1142	−107

- Lietuvos Rytas take first place over Maccabi by virtue of a head-to-head sweep.

== Fixtures and results ==
All times given below are in Central European Time.

=== Game 1 ===
October 24–25, 2007

October 24
18:15

(Report)

Cibona Zagreb (Croatia)	93–85	(Turkey) Efes Pilsen
Scoring by quarter: 21-28, 26-26, 28-16, 18-15

Dražen Petrović BH, Zagreb
Attendance: 3,900

October 24
19:45

(Report)

Aris Thessaloniki (Greece)	87–83	(Spain) Unicaja Málaga
Scoring by quarter: 24-23, 16-16, 19-26, 28-18

Alexandrio Melathron, Thessaloniki
Attendance: 5,000

October 25
20:30

(Report)

Olimpia Milano (Italy)	76–83	(Lithuania) Lietuvos Rytas
Scoring by quarter: 14-26, 15-18, 22-17, 25-22

Datch Forum di Assago, Milan
Attendance: Not available

October 25
20:45

(Report)

Maccabi Tel Aviv (Israel)	74–71	(France) Le Mans
Scoring by quarter: 25-23, 16-19, 15-20, 18-9

Nokia Arena, Tel Aviv
Attendance: 11,000

=== Game 2 ===
October 31 – November 1, 2007

October 31
19:15

(Report)

Efes Pilsen (Turkey)	80–70	(Italy) Olimpia Milano
Scoring by quarter: 20-18, 26-10, 23-24, 11-18

Abdi İpekçi Arena, Istanbul
Attendance: 5,000

October 31
20:45

(Report)

Unicaja Málaga (Spain)	102–64	(Croatia) Cibona Zagreb
Scoring by quarter: 21-18, 33-16, 24-14, 24-16

Jose Maria Martin Carpena Arena, Málaga
Attendance: 7,900

November 1
19:15

(Report)

Lietuvos Rytas (Lithuania)	92–74	(Israel) Maccabi Tel Aviv
Scoring by quarter: 22-14, 24-17, 26-22, 20-21

Siemens Arena, Vilnius
Attendance: 10,800

November 1
20:30

(Report)

Le Mans (France)	66–69	(Greece) Aris Thessaloniki
Scoring by quarter: 18-19, 21-8, 13-22, 17-17

Antarès, Le Mans
Attendance: 4,500

=== Game 3 ===
November 7–8, 2007

November 7
19:45

(Report)

Aris Thessaloniki (Greece)	77–73	(Croatia) Cibona Zagreb
Scoring by quarter: 21-21, 12-19, 21-21, 23-12

Alexandrio Melathron, Thessaloniki
Attendance: 5,000

November 7
20:30

(Report)

Le Mans (France)	77–83	(Lithuania) Lietuvos Rytas
Scoring by quarter: 16-23, 23-16, 21-19, 17-25

Antarès, Le Mans
Attendance: 3,800

November 8
19:45

(Report)

Maccabi Tel Aviv (Israel)	73–67	(Turkey) Efes Pilsen
Scoring by quarter: 18-18, 18-17, 14-20, 23-12

Nokia Arena, Tel Aviv
Attendance: 11,000

November 8
20:00

(Report)

Olimpia Milano (Italy)	65–74	(Spain) Unicaja Málaga
Scoring by quarter: 23-20, 16-17, 11-14, 15-23

Datch Forum di Assago, Milan
Attendance: 2,550

=== Game 4 ===
November 14–15, 2007

November 14
18:15

(Report)

Cibona Zagreb (Croatia)	100–91	(Italy) Olimpia Milano
Scoring by quarter: 26-25, 27-21, 27-21, 20-24

Dražen Petrović BH, Zagreb
Attendance: 3,000

November 14
19:15

(Report)

Lietuvos Rytas (Lithuania)	77–70	(Greece) Aris Thessaloniki
Scoring by quarter: 25-15, 17-16, 19-16, 16-23

Siemens Arena, Vilnius
Attendance: 10,350

November 15
19:15

(Report)

Efes Pilsen (Turkey)	66–63	(France) Le Mans
Scoring by quarter: 13-25, 20-11, 7-15, 26-12

Abdi İpekçi Arena, Istanbul
Attendance: 4,300

November 15
20:00

(Report)

Unicaja Málaga (Spain)	93–70	(Israel) Maccabi Tel Aviv
Scoring by quarter: 21-16, 24-20, 20-21, 28-13

Jose Maria Martin Carpena Arena, Málaga
Attendance: 9,800

=== Game 5 ===
November 21–22, 2007

November 21
19:45

(Report)

Lietuvos Rytas (Lithuania)	70–77	(Turkey) Efes Pilsen
Scoring by quarter: 10-13, 19-20, 18-16, 23-28

Siemens Arena, Vilnius
Attendance: 10,100

November 22
19:45

(Report)

Maccabi Tel Aviv (Israel)	80–74	(Croatia) Cibona Zagreb
Scoring by quarter: 21-22, 19-7, 28-22, 12-23

Nokia Arena, Tel Aviv
Attendance: 11,000

November 22
20:30

(Report)

Le Mans (France)	74–83	(Spain) Unicaja Málaga
Scoring by quarter: 20-27, 21-27, 18-6, 15-23

Antarès, Le Mans
Attendance: 3,800

November 22
20:30

(Report)

Aris Thessaloniki (Greece)	70–77	(Italy) Olimpia Milano
Scoring by quarter: 11-26, 24-15, 19-21, 16-15

Alexandrio Melathron, Thessaloniki
Attendance: 3,500

=== Game 6 ===
November 28–29, 2007

November 28
18:15

(Report)

Cibona Zagreb (Croatia)	91–71	(France) Le Mans
Scoring by quarter: 21-22, 20-18, 26-18, 24-13

Dražen Petrović BH, Zagreb
Attendance: 4,000

November 28
19:45

(Report)

Aris Thessaloniki (Greece)	67–64	(Turkey) Efes Pilsen
Scoring by quarter: 14-17, 18-8, 13-14, 22-25

Alexandrio Melathron, Thessaloniki
Attendance: 4,000

November 28
20:45

(Report)

Unicaja Málaga (Spain)	71–69	(Lithuania) Lietuvos Rytas
Scoring by quarter: 19-18, 21-19, 15-14, 16-18

Jose Maria Martin Carpena Arena, Málaga
Attendance: 9,150

November 29
20:30

(Report)

Olimpia Milano (Italy)	81–82	(Israel) Maccabi Tel Aviv
Scoring by quarter: 25-23, 20-24, 19-14, 17-21

Datch Forum di Assago, Milan
Attendance: Not available

=== Game 7 ===
December 5–6, 2007

December 5
19:15

{Report}

Lietuvos Rytas (Lithuania)	93–59	(Croatia) Cibona Zagreb
Scoring by quarter: 23-14, 24-11, 23-17, 23-17

Siemens Arena, Vilnius
Attendance: 9,845

December 5
19:15

(Report)

Efes Pilsen (Turkey)	91–75	(Spain) Unicaja Málaga
Scoring by quarter: 28-21, 23-15, 20-19, 20-20

Abdi İpekçi Arena, Istanbul
Attendance: 5,500

December 6
19:45

(Report)

Maccabi Tel Aviv (Israel)	85–70	(Greece) Aris Thessaloniki
Scoring by quarter: 23-14, 27-16, 15-23, 20-17

Nokia Arena, Tel Aviv
Attendance: 11,000

December 6
20:30

(Report)

Le Mans (France)	63–71	(Italy) Olimpia Milano
Scoring by quarter: 17-13, 14-20, 22-16, 10-22

Antarès, Le Mans
Attendance: 3,700

=== Game 8 ===
December 12–13, 2007

December 12
19:15

(Report)

Efes Pilsen (Turkey)	100–74	(Croatia) Cibona Zagreb
Scoring by quarter: 25-18, 27-24, 27-17, 21-15

Abdi İpekçi Arena, Istanbul
Attendance: 3,000

December 12
19:15

(Report)

Lietuvos Rytas (Lithuania)	75–62	(Italy) Olimpia Milano
Scoring by quarter: 22-19, 20-15, 20-16, 13-12

Siemens Arena, Vilnius
Attendance: 10,780

December 12
20:45

(Report)

Unicaja Málaga (Spain)	73–52	(Greece) Aris Thessaloniki
Scoring by quarter: 18-9, 13-17, 24-17, 18-9

Jose Maria Martin Carpena Arena, Málaga
Attendance: 9,150

December 13
20:30

(Report)

Le Mans (France)	91–99	(Israel) Maccabi Tel Aviv
Scoring by quarter: 25-24, 19-26, 16-29, 31-20

Antarès, Le Mans
Attendance: 4,200

=== Game 9 ===
December 19–20, 2007

December 19
20:30

(Report)

Olimpia Milano (Italy)	73–76	(Turkey) Efes Pilsen
Scoring by quarter: 14-16, 20-20, 20-25, 19-15

Datch Forum di Assago, Milan
Attendance: Not available

December 20
18:15

(Report)

Cibona Zagreb (Croatia)	62–76	(Spain) Unicaja Málaga
Scoring by quarter: 17-26, 15-6, 11-18, 19-26

Dražen Petrović BH, Zagreb
Attendance: 3,000

December 20
19:50

(Report)

Maccabi Tel Aviv (Israel)	82–87	(Lithuania) Lietuvos Rytas
Scoring by quarter: 25-22, 16-20, 23-19, 18-26

Nokia Arena, Tel Aviv
Attendance: 11,000

December 20
20:30

(Report)

Aris Thessaloniki (Greece)	93–74	(France) Le Mans
Scoring by quarter: 27-23, 27-12, 14-15, 25-24

Alexandrio Melathron, Thessaloniki
Attendance: 2,000

=== Game 10 ===
January 2–3, 2008

January 2
20:45

{Report}

Unicaja Málaga (Spain)	89–70	(Italy) Olimpia Milano
Scoring by quarter: 24-20, 20-17, 24-17, 21-16

Jose Maria Martin Carpena Arena, Málaga
Attendance: 8,400

January 3
17:45

(Report)

Lietuvos Rytas (Lithuania)	85–50	(France) Le Mans
Scoring by quarter: 23-10, 25-16, 24-9, 13-15

Siemens Arena, Vilnius
Attendance: 9,200

January 3
18:15

(Report)

Cibona Zagreb (Croatia)	76–83	(Greece) Aris Thessaloniki
Scoring by quarter: 20-24, 21-24, 21-20, 14-15

Dražen Petrović BH, Zagreb
Attendance: 3,000

January 3
20:15

(Report)

Efes Pilsen (Turkey)	68–83	(Israel) Maccabi Tel Aviv
Scoring by quarter: 23-22, 11-23, 20-17, 14-21

Abdi İpekçi Arena, Istanbul
Attendance: 5,000

=== Game 11 ===
January 9–10, 2008

January 9
19:45

(Report)

Aris Thessaloniki (Greece)	69–72	(Lithuania) Lietuvos Rytas
Scoring by quarter: 15-12, 21-20, 15-17, 18-23

Alexandrio Melathron, Thessaloniki
Attendance: 5,500

January 9
20:30

(Report)

Olimpia Milano (Italy)	63–72	(Croatia) Cibona Zagreb
Scoring by quarter: 16-16, 19-17, 13-18, 15-21

Datch Forum di Assago, Milan
Attendance: Not available

January 10
19:45

(Report)

Maccabi Tel Aviv (Israel)	87–68	(Spain) Unicaja Málaga
Scoring by quarter: 29-27, 15-12, 17-14, 26-15

Nokia Arena, Tel Aviv
Attendance: 11,000

January 10
20:30

(Report)

Le Mans (France)	84–91 (OT)	(Turkey) Efes Pilsen
Scoring by quarter: 26-16, 25-24, 23-21, 6-19, Overtime: 4-11

Antarès, Le Mans
Attendance: 3,600

=== Game 12 ===
January 16–17, 2008

January 16
19:15

{Report}

Efes Pilsen (Turkey)	90–84	(Lithuania) Lietuvos Rytas
Scoring by quarter: 20-24, 26-22, 16-21, 28-17

Abdi İpekçi Arena, Istanbul
Attendance: 4,500

January 16
20:30

{Report}

Olimpia Milano (Italy)	77–69	(Greece) Aris Thessaloniki
Scoring by quarter: 20-15, 15-18, 19-22, 23-14

Datch Forum di Assago, Milan
Attendance: 2,000

January 16
20:45

{Report}

Unicaja Málaga (Spain)	87–68	(France) Le Mans
Scoring by quarter: 23-14, 23-22, 20-10, 21-22

Jose Maria Martin Carpena Arena, Málaga
Attendance: 7,400

January 17
18:15

{Report}

Cibona Zagreb (Croatia)	76–81	(Israel) Maccabi Tel Aviv
Scoring by quarter: 20-17, 4-27, 29-18, 23-19

Dražen Petrović BH, Zagreb
Attendance: 4,500

=== Game 13 ===
January 23–24, 2008

January 23
19:15

{Report}

Efes Pilsen (Turkey)	74–84	(Greece) Aris Thessaloniki
Scoring by quarter: 17-10, 17-21, 17-23, 23-30

Abdi İpekçi Arena, Istanbul
Attendance: 7,700

January 23
19:15

{Report}

Lietuvos Rytas (Lithuania)	71–63	(Spain) Unicaja Málaga
Scoring by quarter: 22-15, 19-13, 13-19, 17-16

Siemens Arena, Vilnius
Attendance: 11,000

January 23
20:30

{Report}

Le Mans (France)	100–87	(Croatia) Cibona Zagreb
Scoring by quarter: 28-17, 30-24, 18-23, 24-23

Antarès, Le Mans
Attendance: 4,500

January 24
19:45

{Report}

Maccabi Tel Aviv (Israel)	91–76	(Italy) Olimpia Milano
Scoring by quarter: 23-27, 21-19, 27-19, 20-11

Nokia Arena, Tel Aviv
Attendance: 11,000

=== Game 14 ===
January 31, 2008

January 31
20:30

{Report}

Unicaja Málaga (Spain)	87–77	(Turkey) Efes Pilsen
Scoring by quarter: 22-24, 32-14, 13-15, 20-24

Jose Maria Martin Carpena Arena, Málaga
Attendance: 9,050

January 31
20:30

{Report}

Olimpia Milano (Italy)	63–83	(France) Le Mans
Scoring by quarter: 18-16, 10-27, 20-22, 15-18

Datch Forum di Assago, Milan
Attendance: 1,500

January 31
20:30

{Report}

Cibona Zagreb (Croatia)	79–86	(Lithuania) Lietuvos Rytas
Scoring by quarter: 23-17, 23-20, 15-27, 18-22

Dražen Petrović BH, Zagreb
Attendance: 2,000

January 31
20:30

{Report}

Aris Thessaloniki (Greece)	94–101 (OT)	(Israel) Maccabi Tel Aviv
Scoring by quarter: 27-24, 16-21, 17-20, 26-21, Overtime: 8-15

Alexandrio Melathron, Thessaloniki
Attendance: 6,000
