= ULEB Cup 2007–08 Regular Season Group B =

These are the Group B Standings and Results:

Key to colors
Top three places in each group, plus five highest-ranked four-places teams, advance to Top 32
Eliminated

== Standings ==
	Team	Pld	W	L	PF	PA	Diff
1.	(Turkey) Beşiktaş Cola Turka	10	10	0	823	704	119
2.	(Latvia) BK Ventspils	10	6	4	829	765	64
3.	(Germany) Köln 99ers	10	6	4	792	808	-16
4.	(France) Elan Chalon	10	5	5	807	795	12
5.	(Serbia) FMP	10	3	7	752	779	-27
6.	(Portugal) Ovarense Aerosoles	10	0	10	760	912	-152

== Results/Fixtures ==
All times given below are in Central European Time.

=== Game 1 ===
November 6, 2007

November 6
18:00

FMP (Serbia)	89–79	(Portugal) Ovarense Aerosoles
Scoring by quarter: 20-23, 26-22, 27-20, 16-14

Belgrade

November 6
19:00

BK Ventspils (Latvia)	79–87	(Turkey) Beşiktaş Cola Turka
Scoring by quarter: 20-19, 16-25, 18-24, 25-19

Ventspils

November 6
19:30

Köln 99ers (Germany)	94–84	(France) Elan Chalon
Scoring by quarter: 28-20, 22-26, 16-25, 28-13

Köln

=== Game 2 ===
November 13, 2007

November 13
19:00

Beşiktaş Cola Turka (Turkey)	79–60	(Germany) Köln 99ers
Scoring by quarter: 23-18, 21-13, 16-13, 19-16

Istanbul

November 13
20:30

Elan Chalon (France)	96–79	(Serbia) FMP
Scoring by quarter: 18-15, 27-19, 32-23, 19-22

Chalon-sur-Saône

November 13
22:00

Ovarense Aerosoles (Portugal)	68–92	(Latvia) BK Ventspils
Scoring by quarter: 11-20, 13-24, 15-17, 29-31

Ovar

=== Game 3 ===
November 20, 2007

November 20
18:00

FMP (Serbia)	77–78	(Turkey) Beşiktaş Cola Turka
Scoring by quarter: 22-24, 21-20, 20-21, 14-13

Belgrade

November 20
18:40

BK Ventspils (Latvia)	88–73	(Germany) Köln 99ers
Scoring by quarter: 25-17, 21-22, 20-16, 22-18

Ventspils

November 20
22:00

Ovarense Aerosoles (Portugal)	86–99	(France) Elan Chalon
Scoring by quarter: 25-21, 16-31, 24-30, 21-17

Ovar

=== Game 4 ===
November 27, 2007

November 27
18:40

BK Ventspils (Latvia)	81–71	(France) Elan Chalon
Scoring by quarter: 30-19, 16-10, 16-17, 19-25

Ventspils

November 27
19:00

Beşiktaş Cola Turka (Turkey)	100–74	(Portugal) Ovarense Aerosoles
Scoring by quarter: 31-10, 20-24, 28-18, 21-22

Istanbul

November 27
19:30

Köln 99ers (Germany)	89–82	(Serbia) FMP
Scoring by quarter: 26-24, 16-28, 24-14, 23-16

Köln

=== Game 5 ===
December 4, 2007

December 4
18:00

FMP (Serbia)	70–76	(Latvia) BK Ventspils
Scoring by quarter: 19-15, 25-24, 13-19, 13-18

Belgrade

December 4
20:30

Elan Chalon (France)	64–73	(Turkey) Beşiktaş Cola Turka
Scoring by quarter: 13-21, 16-20, 16-18, 19-14

Chalon-sur-Saône

December 4
22:00

Ovarense Aerosoles (Portugal)	78–81	(Germany) Köln 99ers
Scoring by quarter: 20-18, 19-19, 14-25, 25-19

Ovar

=== Game 6 ===
December 11, 2007

December 11
19:00

Beşiktaş Cola Turka (Turkey)	84–77 (OT)	(Latvia) BK Ventspils
Scoring by quarter: 24-21, 17-8, 12-22, 12-14, 19-12

Istanbul

December 11
20:30

Elan Chalon (France)	81–87	(Germany) Köln 99ers
Scoring by quarter: 28-21, 19-23, 20-29, 14-14

Chalon-sur-Saône

December 11
22:00

Ovarense Aerosoles (Portugal)	70–80	(Serbia) FMP
Scoring by quarter: 17-17, 13-20, 17-20, 23-23

Ovar

=== Game 7 ===
December 18, 2007

December 18
18:00

FMP (Serbia)	60–72	(France) Elan Chalon
Scoring by quarter: 16-19, 10-19, 23-19, 11-15

Belgrade

December 18
18:40

BK Ventspils (Latvia)	92–67	(Portugal) Ovarense Aerosoles
Scoring by quarter: 24-22, 25-18, 22-12, 21-15

Ventspils

December 18
19:30

Köln 99ers (Germany)	62–73	(Turkey) Beşiktaş Cola Turka
Scoring by quarter: 17-20, 14-14, 14-23, 17-16

Köln

=== Game 8 ===
January 8, 2008

January 8
19:00

Beşiktaş Cola Turka (Turkey)	77–76	(Serbia) FMP
Scoring by quarter: 24-13, 20-27, 15-17, 18-19

Istanbul

January 8
19:30

Köln 99ers (Germany)	84–78	(Latvia) BK Ventspils
Scoring by quarter: 25-16, 18-20, 19-17, 22-25

Köln

January 8
20:30

Elan Chalon (France)	88–68	(Portugal) Ovarense Aerosoles
Scoring by quarter: 12-15, 26-20, 24-21, 26-12

Chalon-sur-Saône

=== Game 9 ===
January 15, 2008

January 15
18:00

FMP (Serbia)	75–65	(Germany) Köln 99ers
Scoring by quarter: 25-15, 21-15, 14-19, 15-16

Belgrade

January 15
20:30

Elan Chalon (France)	97–89	(Latvia) BK Ventspils
Scoring by quarter: 10-18, 25-18, 18-21, 28-24, 16-8

Chalon-sur-Saône

January 15
22:30

Ovarense Aerosoles (Portugal)	80–94	(Turkey) Beşiktaş Cola Turka
Scoring by quarter: 21-25, 23-24, 21-23, 15-22

Köln

=== Game 10 ===
January 22, 2008

January 22
19:00

Beşiktaş Cola Turka (Turkey)	78–55	(France) Elan Chalon
Scoring by quarter: 22-9, 16-19, 18-11, 22-16

Istanbul

January 22
19:00

Köln 99ers (Germany)	97–90	(Portugal) Ovarense Aerosoles
Scoring by quarter: 19-26, 21-24, 34-19, 23-21

Köln

January 22
19:00

BK Ventspils (Latvia)	77–64	(Serbia) FMP
Scoring by quarter: 19-15, 19-10, 23-16, 16-23

Ventspils
