= Clermont-Ferrand Sports Hall =

Sports venue in Clermont-Ferrand, France

Coordinates: 45°47′08.48″N 3°05′13.31″E

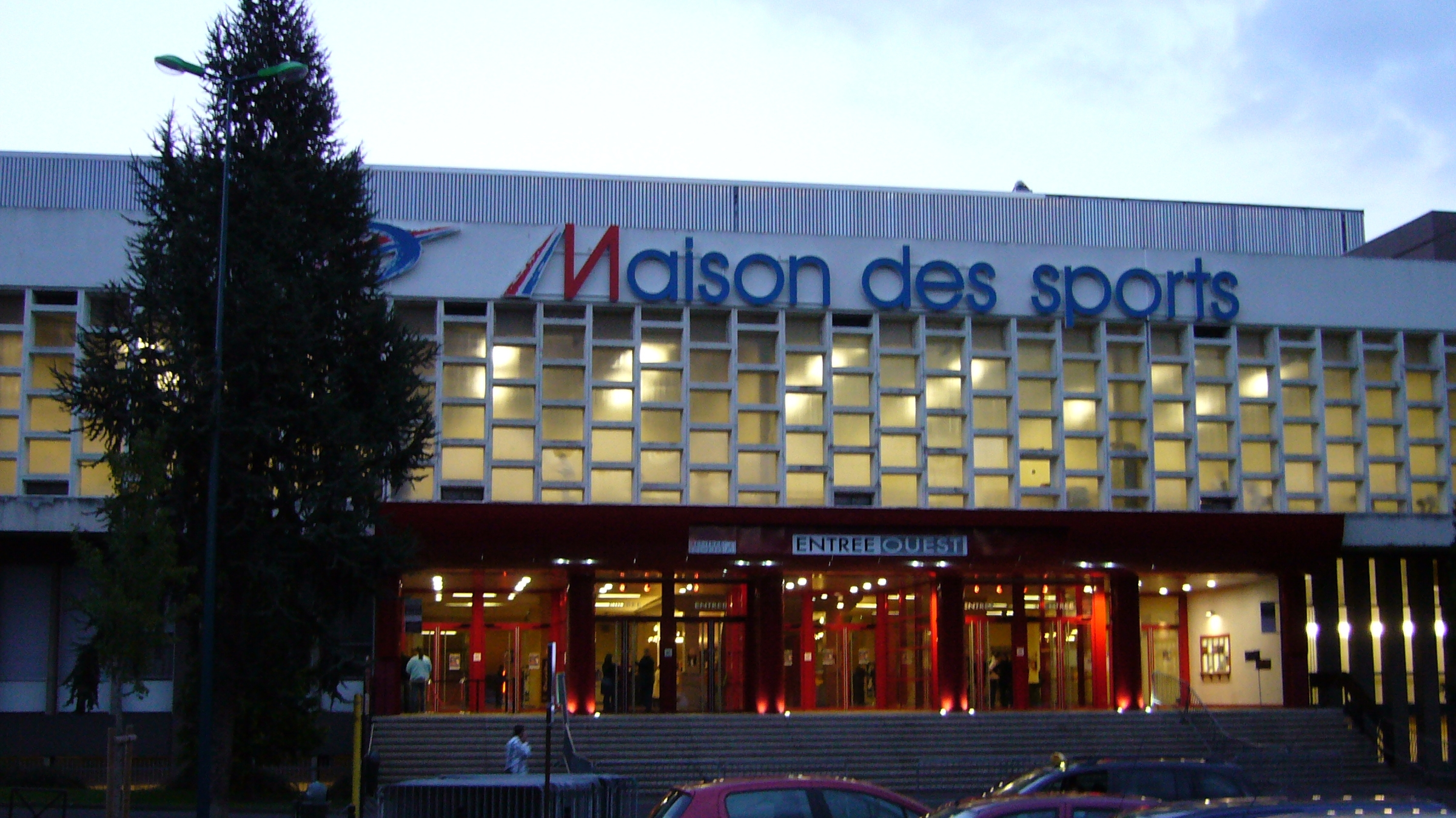
The Sports Hall around October 2007

Clermont-Ferrand Sports Hall is an indoor arena located in Clermont-Ferrand, France. It has a seating capacity of 5,000 spectators.

It is used primarily for basketball, and is the home venue of Stade Clermontois BA from the Pro A. Besides that, its also used for concerts. Iron Maiden performed here in 1982.

It served as one of the playgrounds for the FIBA EuroBasket 1999.

The facility was also used by another Pro A side, Chorale Roanne, for its Euroleague fixtures.
