= Antarès =

Sporting arena in Le Mans, France

Coordinates: 47°57′22″N 0°13′34″E

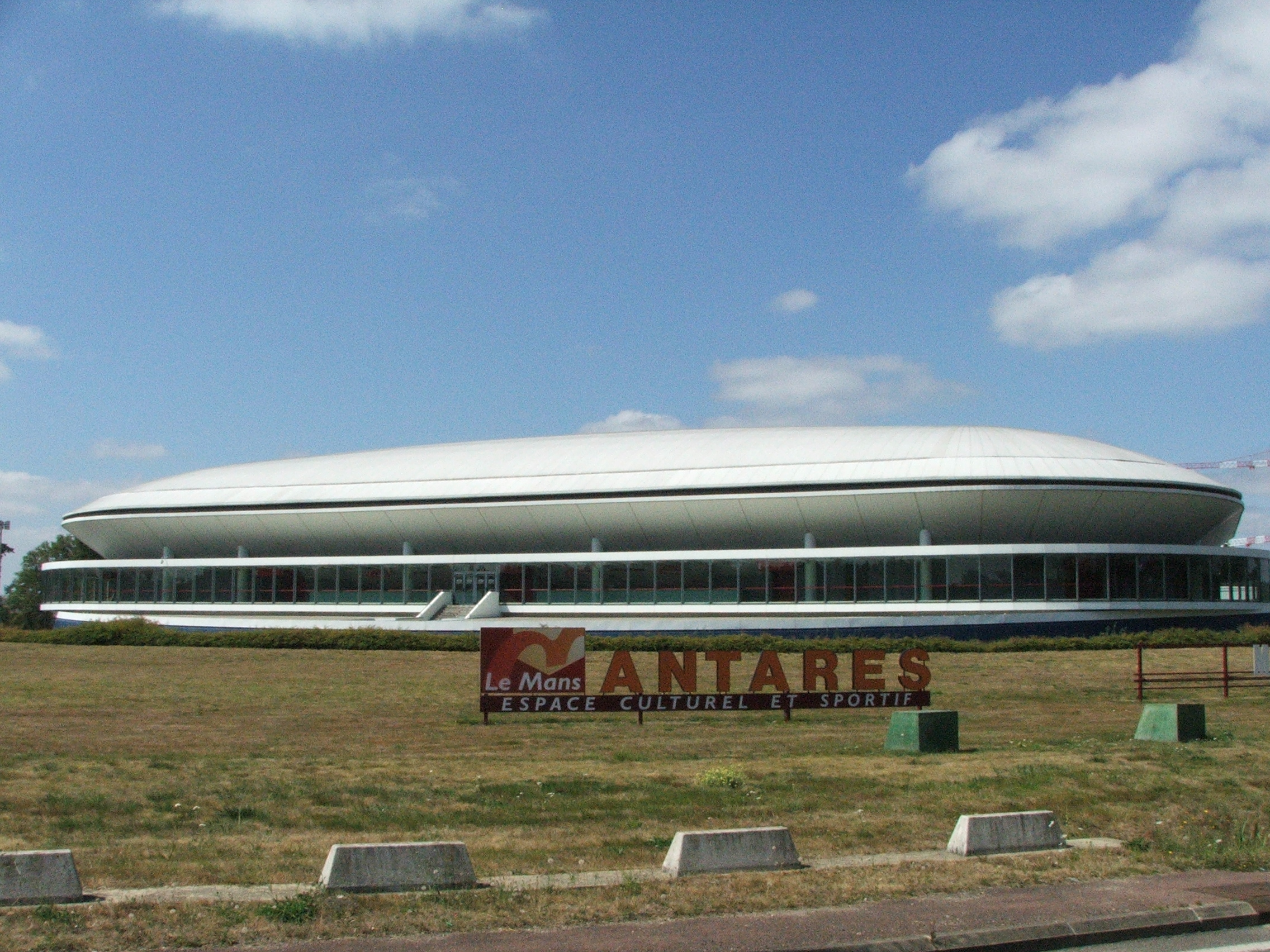
- Interactive map of Antarès
- Location: Le Mans, France
- Capacity: Basketball: 6,023

Construction
- Opened: 1995
- Architect: DMT Architectes

Antarès is an indoor sporting arena that is located in Le Mans, France. The arena is located inside the Circuit de la Sarthe, home of the famous 24 Hours of Le Mans, and adjacent to the first right kink on the Mulsanne Straight. The seating capacity of the arena, which was inaugurated in 1995, is 6,023 people when configured for basketball games.

== History ==
Antarès has been used as the home arena of the Le Mans Sarthe Basket professional basketball team of the French LNB Pro A league. It served as one of the host arenas for the FIBA EuroBasket 1999.

== See also ==
- List of indoor arenas in France
