= Palasport Mens Sana =

Sport venue in Siena, Italy

- PalaMensSana
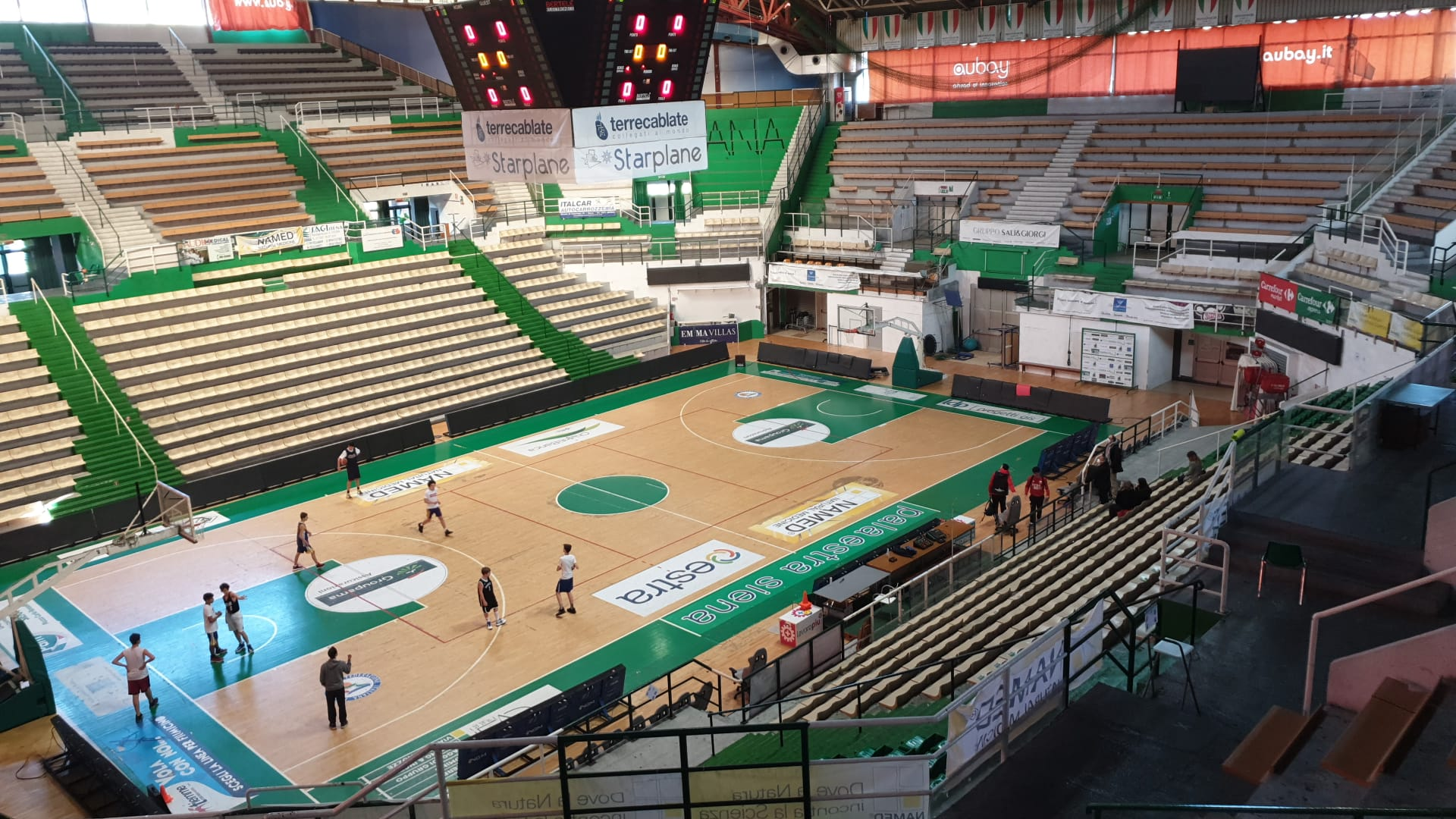
- Interactive map of Palasport Mens Sana
- Full name: Palasport Mens Sana
- Former names: Palasclavo
- Location: Via Sclavo, 53100 Siena, Italy
- Coordinates: 43°20′2.40″N 11°18′49.28″E
- Capacity: Basketball: 6,000 (seating); 7,050 (standing)
- Surface: Parquet

Construction
- Built: 1975-1976
- Opened: October 24, 1976

Tenant
- Montepaschi Siena (1976–present)

Palasport Mens Sana is an indoor sporting arena located in Via Sclavo, Siena, Italy. The seating capacity of the arena is for 6,000 people. Opened in 1976, it is currently home to the Mens Sana Basket professional basketball team.

It was one of the host arenas of the EuroBasket 1979.

In 2020, LED lightings are being installed to be modern, adequate and energy savings. Also, the central scoreboard is being dismantled as well.

== See also ==
- List of indoor arenas in Italy
