= 2007–08 Euroleague Individual Statistics =

Euroleague 2007–08 Individual Statistics is the statistics about players, playing in Euroleague 2007-08. Top 5 for each category.

== Regular season ==
=== Points ===
Rank	Name	Team	Games	Points	PPG
1.	(United States) Marc Salyers	(France) Roanne	14	305	21.8
2.	(United States) Dewarick Spencer	(Italy) Virtus Bologna	10	181	18.1
3.	(Montenegro) Nikola Peković	(Serbia) Partizan Belgrade	14	251	17.9
4.	(United States) Will Solomon	(Turkey) Fenerbahçe	13	231	17.8
5.	(United States) Hollis Price	(Lithuania) Lietuvos Rytas	14	236	16.9

=== Rebounds ===
Rank	Name	Team	Games	Rebounds	RPG
1.	(United States) Travis Watson	(Italy) Armani Jeans Milano	14	136	9.7
2.	(Turkey) Mirsad Türkcan	(Turkey) Fenerbahçe	11	102	9.3
3.	(United States) Jeremiah Massey	(Greece) Aris Thessaloniki	14	113	8.1
4.	(Montenegro) Nikola Peković	(Serbia) Partizan Belgrade	14	112	8.0
5.	(Spain) Felipe Reyes	(Spain) Real Madrid	13	100	7.7

=== Assists ===
Rank	Name	Team	Games	Assists	APG
1.	(United States) DeJuan Collins	(Lithuania) Žalgiris Kaunas	14	69	4.9
2.	(France) Marc-Antoine Pellin	(France) Roanne	14	63	4.5
3.	(United States) Will Solomon	(Turkey) Fenerbahçe	13	57	4.4
4.	(Israel) Raviv Limonad	(France) Le Mans	14	58	4.1
5.	(United States) Hollis Price	(Lithuania) Lietuvos Rytas	14	57	4.07

== Top 16 ==
=== Points ===
Rank	Name	Team	Games	Points	PPG
1.	(United States) Will Solomon	(Turkey) Fenerbahçe	6	123	20.5
2.	(United States) Jeremiah Massey	(Greece) Aris Thessaloniki	6	120	20
3.	(United States) Lynn Greer	(Greece) Olympiacos	6	113	18.9
4.	(United States) Hollis Price	(Lithuania) Lietuvos Rytas Vilnius	6	101	16.8
4.	(Bosnia and Herzegovina) Kenan Bajramović	(Lithuania) Lietuvos Rytas Vilnius	6	101	16.8

=== Rebounds ===
Rank	Name	Team	Games	Rebounds	RPG
1.	(United States) Terence Morris	(Israel) Maccabi Tel Aviv	6	61	10.2
2.	(United States) Jeremiah Massey	(Greece) Aris Thessaloniki	6	56	9.3
3.	(Turkey) Kerem Gönlüm	(Turkey) Efes Pilsen	6	45	7.5
4.	(Bosnia and Herzegovina) Kenan Bajramović	(Lithuania) Lietuvos Rytas Vilnius	6	43	7.2
5.	(Senegal) Mamadou N'Diaye	(Lithuania) Žalgiris Kaunas	6	42	7

=== Assists ===
Rank	Name	Team	Games	Assists	APG
1.	(Greece) Theodoros Papaloukas	(Russia) CSKA Moscow	6	42	7
2.	(United States) DeJuan Collins	(Lithuania) Zalgiris Kaunas	6	38	6.3
3.	(United States) Terrell McIntyre	(Italy) Montepaschi Siena	6	35	5.8
4.	(Argentina) Pablo Prigioni	(Spain) TAU Ceramica	6	27	4.5
5.	(Croatia) Zoran Planinić	(Spain) TAU Ceramica	6	26	4.3

== Playoffs ==
=== Points ===
Rank	Name	Team	Games	Points	PPG
1.	(Italy) Gianluca Basile	(Spain) AXA FC Barcelona	3	58	19.3
2.	(Lithuania) Ramūnas Šiškauskas	(Russia) CSKA Moscow	3	56	18.7
3.	(Slovenia) Matjaž Smodiš	(Russia) CSKA Moscow	3	51	17
4.	(Lithuania) Kšyštof Lavrinovič	(Italy) Montepaschi Siena	2	34	17
5.	(United States) Bootsy Thornton	(Italy) Montepaschi Siena	2	32	16

=== Rebounds ===
Rank	Name	Team	Games	Rebounds	RPG
1.	(United States) Terence Morris	(Israel) Maccabi Tel Aviv	3	29	9.7
2.	(Spain) Fran Vázquez	(Spain) AXA FC Barcelona	3	25	8.3
3.	(Serbia) Novica Veličković	(Serbia) Partizan Belgrade	3	24	8
4.	(Turkey) Mirsad Türkcan	(Turkey) Fenerbahçe	1	8	8
5.	(Greece) Giorgos Printezis	(Greece) Olympiacos	3	17	5.7

=== Assists ===
Rank	Name	Team	Games	Assists	APG
1.	(Israel) Yotam Halperin	(Israel) Maccabi Tel Aviv	3	16	5.3
2.	(Greece) Theodoros Papaloukas	(Russia) CSKA Moscow	3	15	5
2.	(United States) Lynn Greer	(Greece) Olympiacos	3	15	5
4.	(United States) Terrell McIntyre	(Italy) Montepaschi Siena	2	10	5
5.	(United States) Bootsy Thornton	(Italy) Montepaschi Siena	2	8	4

== Final four ==
=== Points ===
Rank	Name	Team	Games	Points	PPG
1.	(United States) Terrell McIntyre	(Italy) Montepaschi Siena	2	42	21
2.	(Lithuania) Kšyštof Lavrinovič	(Italy) Montepaschi Siena	2	36	18
2.	(United States) Will Bynum	(Israel) Maccabi Tel Aviv	2	36	18
4.	(Brazil) Tiago Splitter	(Spain) TAU Cerámica	2	32	16
4.	(Central African Republic) Romain Sato	(Italy) Montepaschi Siena	2	32	16

=== Rebounds ===
Rank	Name	Team	Games	Rebounds	RPG
1.	(Central African Republic) Romain Sato	(Italy) Montepaschi Siena	2	20	10
2.	(United States) Shaun Stonerook	(Italy) Montepaschi Siena	2	15	7.5
2.	(United States) Pete Mickeal	(Spain) TAU Cerámica	2	15	7.5
4.	(Slovenia) Matjaž Smodiš	(Russia) CSKA Moscow	2	14	7
4.	(United States) Terence Morris	(Israel) Maccabi Tel Aviv	2	14	7

=== Assists ===
Rank	Name	Team	Games	Assists	APG
1.	(United States) Terrell McIntyre	(Italy) Montepaschi Siena	2	17	8.5
2.	(Argentina) Pablo Prigioni	(Spain) TAU Cerámica	2	14	7
3.	(United States) Will Bynum	(Israel) Maccabi Tel Aviv	2	11	5.5
4.	(Croatia) Zoran Planinić	(Spain) TAU Cerámica	2	6	3
4.	(United States) Jon Robert Holden	(Russia) CSKA Moscow	2	6	3

== Full season ==
=== Points ===
Rank	Name	Team	Games	Points	PPG
1.	(United States) Will Solomon	(Turkey) Fenerbahçe	21	376	17.9
2.	(United States) Jeremiah Massey	(Greece) Aris Thessaloniki	20	340	17
3.	(United States) Hollis Price	(Lithuania) Lietuvos Rytas Vilnius	20	337	16.8
4.	(Montenegro) Nikola Peković	(Serbia) Partizan Belgrade	23	378	16.4
5.	(United States) Lynn Greer	(Greece) Olympiacos	19	309	16.3

=== Rebounds ===
Rank	Name	Team	Games	Rebounds	RPG
1.	(United States) Jeremiah Massey	(Greece) Aris Thessaloniki	20	169	8.4
2.	(United States) Terence Morris	(Israel) Maccabi Tel Aviv	25	208	8.3
3.	(Spain) Felipe Reyes	(Spain) Real Madrid	19	135	7.1
4.	(Montenegro) Nikola Peković	(Serbia) Partizan Belgrade	23	158	6.9
5.	(Serbia) Novica Veličković	(Serbia) Partizan Belgrade	22	151	6.9

=== Assists ===
Rank	Name	Team	Games	Assists	APG
1.	(United States) DeJuan Collins	(Lithuania) Žalgiris Kaunas	20	107	5.3
2.	(United States) Terrell McIntyre	(Italy) Montepaschi Siena	24	118	4.9
3.	(Greece) Theodoros Papaloukas	(Russia) CSKA Moscow	23	105	4.6
4.	(Argentina) Pablo Prigioni	(Spain) TAU Cerámica	25	103	4.1
5.	(Israel) Yotam Halperin	(Israel) Maccabi Tel Aviv	25	99	4
