= EuroLeague assists leader =

The EuroLeague assists leader is the season-by-season leader in assists of the EuroLeague, which is the top-tier level men's professional basketball club competition in Europe. The award is officially determined by the highest assists per game (APG) average throughout the entire EuroLeague season, including the regular season, playoffs, and the Final Four. Since the modern Euroleague Basketball (ECA) era began in the 2000–01 season, Nick Calathes holds the record for the most season assist titles, having led the league four times. He also holds the record for the highest single-season average, recording 9.1 assists per game during the 2019–20 season.

== Assists per game leaders ==
Season	Player	Club	APG	Games	Ref
2000–01	(Croatia) Ivica Marić	(Croatia) Zadar	5.9	10	
2001–02	(Panama) Elmer Bennett	(Spain) TAU Cerámica	5.3	15	
2002–03	(United States) Ed Cota	(Lithuania) Žalgiris	6.5	14	
2003–04	(United States) Ed Cota (2)	(Lithuania) Žalgiris	5.7	20	
2004–05	(United States) Mire Chatman	(France) Pau-Orthez	6.2	14	
2005–06	(Argentina) Pablo Prigioni	(Spain) TAU Cerámica	6.2	25	
2006–07	(Greece) Theo Papaloukas	(Russia) CSKA Moscow	5.4	25	
2007–08	(United States) DeJuan Collins	(Lithuania) Žalgiris	5.4	20	
2008–09	(Greece) Theo Papaloukas (2)	(Greece) Olympiacos	5.2	22	
2009–10	(Montenegro) Omar Cook	(Spain) Unicaja	5.9	16	
2010–11	(Greece) Dimitris Diamantidis	(Greece) Panathinaikos	6.2	22	
2011–12	(Montenegro) Omar Cook (2)	(Italy) EA7 Emporio Armani Milan	5.7	16	
2012–13	(Croatia) Zoran Planinić	(Russia) Khimki	6.3	22	
2013–14	(Greece) Dimitris Diamantidis (2)	(Greece) Panathinaikos	6.2	29	
2014–15	(Serbia) Miloš Teodosić	(Russia) CSKA Moscow	7.0	24	
2015–16	(France) Thomas Heurtel	(Turkey) Anadolu Efes	7.9	24	
2016–17	(Serbia) Miloš Teodosić (2)	(Russia) CSKA Moscow	6.8	29	
2017–18	(Greece) Nick Calathes	(Greece) Panathinaikos	8.0	31	
2018–19	(Greece) Nick Calathes (2)	(Greece) Panathinaikos	8.7	33	
2019–20	(Greece) Nick Calathes (3)	(Greece) Panathinaikos	9.1	28	
2020–21	(Russia) Alexey Shved	(Russia) Khimki	7.7	23	
2021–22	(Greece) Nick Calathes (4)	(Spain) FC Barcelona	6.4	29	
2022–23	(United States) Darius Thompson	(Spain) Cazoo Baskonia	6.7	34	
2023–24	(Bulgaria) Codi Miller-McIntyre	(Spain) Baskonia	7.3	39	
2024–25	(North Macedonia) T. J. Shorts	(France) Paris Basketball	7.3	37	
2025–26	(Bulgaria) Codi Miller-McIntyre (2)	(Serbia) Crvena zvezda	7.4	39	

== See also ==
- EuroLeague career statistical leaders
- Alphonso Ford EuroLeague Top Scorer Trophy
