= Eurocup Basketball 2012–13 Regular Season Group H =

Standings and Results for Group H of the Regular Season phase of the 2012–13 Eurocup basketball tournament.

== Standings ==
All times are CET (UTC+1).

Key to colors
Top two teams advance to Last 16

	Team	Pld	W	L	PF	PA	Diff	Tie-break
1.	(Serbia) Crvena Zvezda Telekom	6	5	1	556	515	+41	
2.	(Spain) Cajasol Sevilla	6	3	3	483	471	+12	
3.	(France) Orléans Loiret	6	2	4	465	478	–13	2–0
4.	(Italy) Dinamo Sassari	6	2	4	516	556	–40	0–2

=== Game 1 ===
7 November 2012
19:15

Report

Crvena Zvezda Telekom (Serbia)	93–73	(France) Orléans Loiret
Scoring by quarter: 21–13, 22–24, 29–23, 21–13
Pts: Scott 22; Rebs: Savović 9 Asts: Katić 6		Pts: Green 17; Rebs: Green 7 Asts: Young 5

Pionir Hall, Belgrade
Attendance: 7,500
Referees: Emin Moğulkoç (TUR), Miroslav Tomov (BUL), Omer Esteron (ISR)

7 November 2012
20:45

Report

Dinamo Sassari (Italy)	87–84	(Spain) Cajasol Sevilla
Scoring by quarter: 25–21, 20–21, 21–28, 21–14
Pts: Thornton 26; Rebs: Easley 5 Asts: T. Diener 8		Pts: Asbury 19; Rebs: Triguero 6 Asts: Satoranský 7

Palaserradimigni, Sassari
Attendance: 3,310
Referees: Matej Boltauzer (SLO), Anastasios Piloidis (GRE), Saso Petek (SLE)

=== Game 2 ===
14 November 2012
20:30

Report

Cajasol Sevilla (Spain)	93–95 (OT)	(Serbia) Crvena Zvezda Telekom
Scoring by quarter: 20–17, 10–16, 15–26, 38–24, Overtime: 10–12
Pts: Asbury 26; Rebs: Asbury, Dozier 6 Asts: Asbury, Holland 3		Pts: Rakočević 25; Rebs: Subotić 8 Asts: Nelson 5

Palacio Municipal de Deportes San Pablo, Seville
Attendance: 2,500
Referees: Joseph Bissang (FRA), Renaud Geller (BEL), Tomas Trawicki (POL)

14 November 2012
20:30

Report

Orléans Loiret (France)	88–75	(Italy) Dinamo Sassari
Scoring by quarter: 22–25, 24–16, 23–19, 19–15
Pts: Green 23; Rebs: Green 8 Asts: Greene 5		Pts: Easley 20; Rebs: Easley 13; Asts: T. Diener 7

Palais des Sports, Orléans
Attendance: 2,200
Referees: Fernando Rocha (POR), Tomas Jasevicius (LTU), Luis Lopes (POR)

=== Game 3 ===
21 November 2012
19:15

Report

Crvena Zvezda Telekom (Serbia)	116–104	(Italy) Dinamo Sassari
Scoring by quarter: 31–33, 26–21, 33–24, 26–26
Pts: Rakočević 28; Rebs: Brown 7 Asts: Rakočević 7, Subotić 7		Pts: Thornton 33; Rebs: Ignerski 6 Asts: T. Diener 15

Pionir Hall, Belgrade
Attendance: 7,000
Referees: Robert Lottermoser (GER), Regis Bardera (FRA), Sergio Silva (POR)

21 November 2012
20:30

Report

Orléans Loiret (France)	56–70	(Spain) Cajasol Sevilla
Scoring by quarter: 10–21, 20–20, 15–9, 11–20
Pts: Green 12; Rebs: Green 7 Asts: Pellin 4		Pts: Satoranský 20; Rebs: Triguero 7 Asts: Satoranský, Bogdanović 4

Palais des Sports, Orléans
Attendance: 2,388
Referees: Spiros Gkontas(GRE), Haris Bijedic(BIH), Jurgis Laurinavicius(LTU)

=== Game 4 ===
27 November 2012
20:30

Report

Cajasol Sevilla (Spain)	84–78	(France) Orléans Loiret
Scoring by quarter: 23–18, 10–17, 26–20, 25–23
Pts: Asbury 27; Rebs: Satoranský 6 Asts: Satoranský 5		Pts: Green 21; Rebs: Greene 8 Asts: Pellin 7

Palacio Municipal de Deportes San Pablo, Seville
Attendance: 2,100
Referees: Andrej Jersan (SLO), Apostolos Kalpakas (SWE), Sergio Silva (POR)

28 November 2012
20:45

Report

Dinamo Sassari (Italy)	94–97	(Serbia) Crvena Zvezda Telekom
Scoring by quarter: 20–31, 23–22, 26–25, 25–19
Pts: T. Diener 21; Rebs: Ignerski 7 Asts: T. Diener, D. Diener 7		Pts: Nelson 20; Rebs: Brown 8 Asts: Nelson 3

Palaserradimigni, Sassari
Attendance: 2,700
Referees: Marek Cmikiewicz (POL), Elias Koromilas (GRE), Petros Papapetrou (GRE)

=== Game 5 ===
5 December 2012
20:30

Report

Orléans Loiret (France)	75–85	(Serbia) Crvena Zvezda Telekom
Scoring by quarter: 19–22, 24–15, 15–31, 17–17
Pts: Young 25; Rebs: Kozan 5 Asts: Pellin 7		Pts: Subotić 24; Rebs: Scott 9 Asts: Nelson 5

Palais des Sports, Orléans
Attendance: 3,500
Referees: Roberto Chiari (ITA), Anna Cardus (ESP), Carlos Cortes (ESP)

5 December 2012
20:30

Report

Cajasol Sevilla (Spain)	76–85	(Italy) Dinamo Sassari
Scoring by quarter: 18–25, 13–22, 18–15, 27–23
Pts: Asbury, Williams 16; Rebs: Williams 12; Asts: Satoranský 7		Pts: D. Diener 31; Rebs: D. Diener 9 Asts: T. Diener 10

Palacio Municipal de Deportes San Pablo, Seville
Attendance: 2,300
Referees: Milivoje Jovcic (SRB), Oliver Krause (GER), Aare Halliko (EST)

=== Game 6 ===
12 December 2012
20:00

Report

Dinamo Sassari (Italy)	71–95	(France) Orléans Loiret
Scoring by quarter: 25–26, 9–16, 21–27, 16–26
Pts: D. Diener 27; Rebs: Thornton 6 Asts: T. Diener 4		Pts: Green 23; Rebs: Hill 8 Asts: Pellin 8

Palaserradimigni, Sassari
Attendance: 3,000
Referees: Milija Vojinovic (SRB), Rustu Nuran (TUR), Tomislav Vovk (CRO)

12 December 2012
20:00

Report

Crvena Zvezda Telekom (Serbia)	70–76	(Spain) Cajasol Sevilla
Scoring by quarter: 12–25, 24–21, 16–15, 18–15
Pts: Katić 12; Rebs: Savović 8 Asts: Katić 5		Pts: Bogdanović 16; Rebs: Triguero 7 Asts: Satoranský 8

Pionir Hall, Belgrade
Attendance: 5,500
Referees: Christos Christodoulou (GRE), Joseph Bissang (FRA), Oskars Lucis (LAT)
