= 2008 Euroleague Final Four =

Basketball tournament

- Season: 2007–08 Euroleague

Tournament details
- Arena: Palacio de Deportes; Madrid, Spain
- Dates: May 2, – May 4, 2008

Final positions
- Champions: (Russia) CSKA Moscow (6th title)
- Runners-up: (Israel) Maccabi Tel Aviv
- Third place: (Italy) Montepaschi Siena
- Fourth place: (Spain) Baskonia

Awards and statistics
- MVP: (United States) Trajan Langdon

The 2008 Euroleague Final Four was the final phase Euroleague Final Four tournament of the Euroleague 2007–08 season, featuring four teams that survived a 14-game Regular Season, 6 games in the Top 16 phase, and a best-of-three quarterfinal. It was played on May 2 and May 4 in Madrid at the Community of Madrid Sports Palace.

As in previous years, the EuroLeague Final Four involved four games. The first day featured the two semifinal matches. The final day started with the third-place game between the semifinal losers, followed by the EuroLeague Final.

The EuroLeague champions were Russian power CSKA Moscow. They established new records for the EuroLeague era, with their sixth consecutive Final Four appearance, and third consecutive final game appearance. The title, their sixth overall, put them second in all-time European titles to Real Madrid. CSKA's Trajan Langdon was named EuroLeague Final Four MVP.

== Arena ==
The host venue was the 15,000 capacity Palacio de Deportes de la Comunidad de Madrid. Opened in 2005, it stands on the site of a previous arena that was built in 1960, and destroyed by fire in 2001.

== Final four ==
=== Bracket ===
Semi-finals
May 2, Madrid
(Italy) Montepaschi Siena | 85
(Israel) Maccabi Tel Aviv | 92
May 2, Madrid
(Spain) Baskonia | 79
(Russia) CSKA Moscow | 83

Final
May 4, Madrid
(Israel) Maccabi Tel Aviv | 77
(Russia) CSKA Moscow | 91
Third place
May 4, Madrid
(Italy) Montepaschi Siena | 97
(Spain) Baskonia | 93

=== Semifinals ===
==== Montepaschi Siena - Maccabi Tel Aviv ====
May 2
18:00

(Report)

| Montepaschi Siena (Italy) | 85–92 | (Israel) Maccabi Tel Aviv |
Scoring by quarter: 20-8, 25-25, 19-28, 21-31
| Pts: McIntyre 26; Rebs: Sato 11; Asts: McIntyre 5 | | Pts: Garcia 19; Rebs: Morris 7 Asts: Bynum 7 |

Palacio de Deportes, Madrid
Attendance: 13,480
Referees: Jungebrand (FIN), Hierrezuelo (ESP), Dozai (CRO)

==== Baskonia – CSKA Moscow ====
| May 2 | Baskonia (Spain) | 79–83 | (Russia) CSKA Moscow | Palacio de Deportes, Madrid |
| 21:00 | Scoring by quarter: 20-20, 19-13, 17-24, 23-26 |
| | Pts: Rakočević 19; Rebs: McDonald, Prigioni 6 Asts: Prigioni 3 | Report | Pts: Šiškauskas, Andersen 16; Rebs: Smodiš 6 Asts: JR Holden 3 | Attendance: 13,480; Referees: Brazauskas (LTU), Koukoulekidis (GRE), Ankarali (TUR) |

=== Third Place game ===
May 4
19:00

(Report)

| Montepaschi Siena (Italy) | 97–93 (OT) | (Spain) Baskonia OT |
Scoring by quarter: 21-19, 17-22, 23-20, 18-18, Overtime: 18-14
| Pts: Lavrinovič 19; Rebs: Sato, Stonerook 9 Asts: McIntyre 12 | | Pts: Mickeal 16; Rebs: Mickeal 10; Asts: Prigioni 11 |

Palacio de Deportes, Madrid
Attendance: 13,480
Referees: Brazauskas (LTU), Ryzhyk (UKR), Gontas (GRE)

=== Championship game ===
| May 4, 2008 | Maccabi Tel Aviv (Israel) | 77–91 | (Russia) CSKA Moscow | Palacio de Deportes, Madrid |
| 21:00 CET | Scoring by quarter: 21-22, 20-20, 16-21, 20-28 |
| | Pts: Bynum 23; Rebs: Morris, Batista 7 Asts: Bynum 4 PIR: Bynum 22 | Boxscore | Pts: Langdon 21; Rebs: Smodiš 8 Asts: Papaloukas 4 PIR: Langdon 33 | Attendance: 13,480; Referees: Koukoulekidis, Hierrezuelo, Dozai |

| Starters: | | | Pts | Reb | Ast |
|---|---|---|---|---|---|
| PG | 4 | (United States) Will Bynum | 23 | 2 | 4 |
| SG | 21 | (Israel) Yotam Halperin | 9 | 1 | 1 |
| SF | 11 | (Israel) Omri Casspi | 9 | 1 | 0 |
| PF | 9 | (United States) Terence Morris | 13 | 7 | 0 |
| C | 7 | (Croatia) Nikola Vujčić | 2 | 5 | 1 |
| Reserves: | | | | | |
| PF | 5 | (United States) Marcus Fizer | DNP | | |
| PG | 6 | (Israel) Derrick Sharp | 0 | 0 | 0 |
| PF | 8 | (Israel) Lior Eliyahu | 0 | 0 | 0 |
| G/F | 10 | (Israel) Tal Burstein | DNP | | |
| G | 12 | (Brazil) Alex Garcia | 2 | 5 | 2 |
| F | 13 | (Israel) David Bluthenthal | 5 | 1 | 0 |
| G | 14 | (United States) Vonteego Cummings | 0 | 0 | 0 |
| PF | 15 | (Uruguay) Esteban Batista | 14 | 7 | 1 |
| G | 22 | (Israel) Gal Mekel | DNP | | |
| G | 33 | (Israel) Regev Fanan | DNP | | |
Head coach:
(Israeli Basketball Association) Zvi Sherf

| Maccabi | CSKA Moscow |

| Starters: | | | Pts | Reb | Ast |
|---|---|---|---|---|---|
| PG | 10 | (Russia) J.R. Holden | 14 | 1 | 3 |
| SG | 21 | (United States) Trajan Langdon | 21 | 7 | 1 |
| SF | 9 | (Lithuania) Ramūnas Šiškauskas | 13 | 4 | 2 |
| PF | 8 | (Slovenia) Matjaž Smodiš | 13 | 8 | 3 |
| C | 13 | (Australia) David Andersen | 13 | 5 | 1 |
| Reserves: | | | | | |
| F | 4 | (Greece) Theo Papaloukas | 12 | 2 | 4 |
| G | 6 | (Greece) Nikos Zisis | 0 | 0 | 0 |
| C | 7 | (Russia) Anatoly Kashirov | DNP | | |
| G | 11 | (Russia) Zakhar Pashutin | DNP | | |
| C | 15 | (Russia) Artem Zabelin | DNP | | |
| PF | 20 | (Russia) Andrey Vorontsevich | DNP | | |
| F/C | 22 | (United States) Marcus Goree | 2 | 2 | 0 |
| G | 23 | (Russia) Alexey Shved | DNP | | |
| C | 24 | (Belgium) Tomas Van Den Spiegel | 3 | 1 | 0 |
| F | 31 | (Russia) Victor Khryapa | 0 | 1 | 0 |
Head coach:
(Italian Basketball Federation) Ettore Messina

- Team captains (C): (Israel) Derrick Sharp (Maccabi Tel Aviv) and (Russia) Zakhar Pashutin (CSKA Moscow)

== Awards ==
=== Euroleague Final Four MVP ===
- (United States) Trajan Langdon ( (Russia) CSKA Moscow)

=== Euroleague Finals Top Scorer ===
- (United States) Will Bynum ( (Israel) Maccabi Tel Aviv)
