= Zoran Planinić =

Croatian basketball player (born 1982)

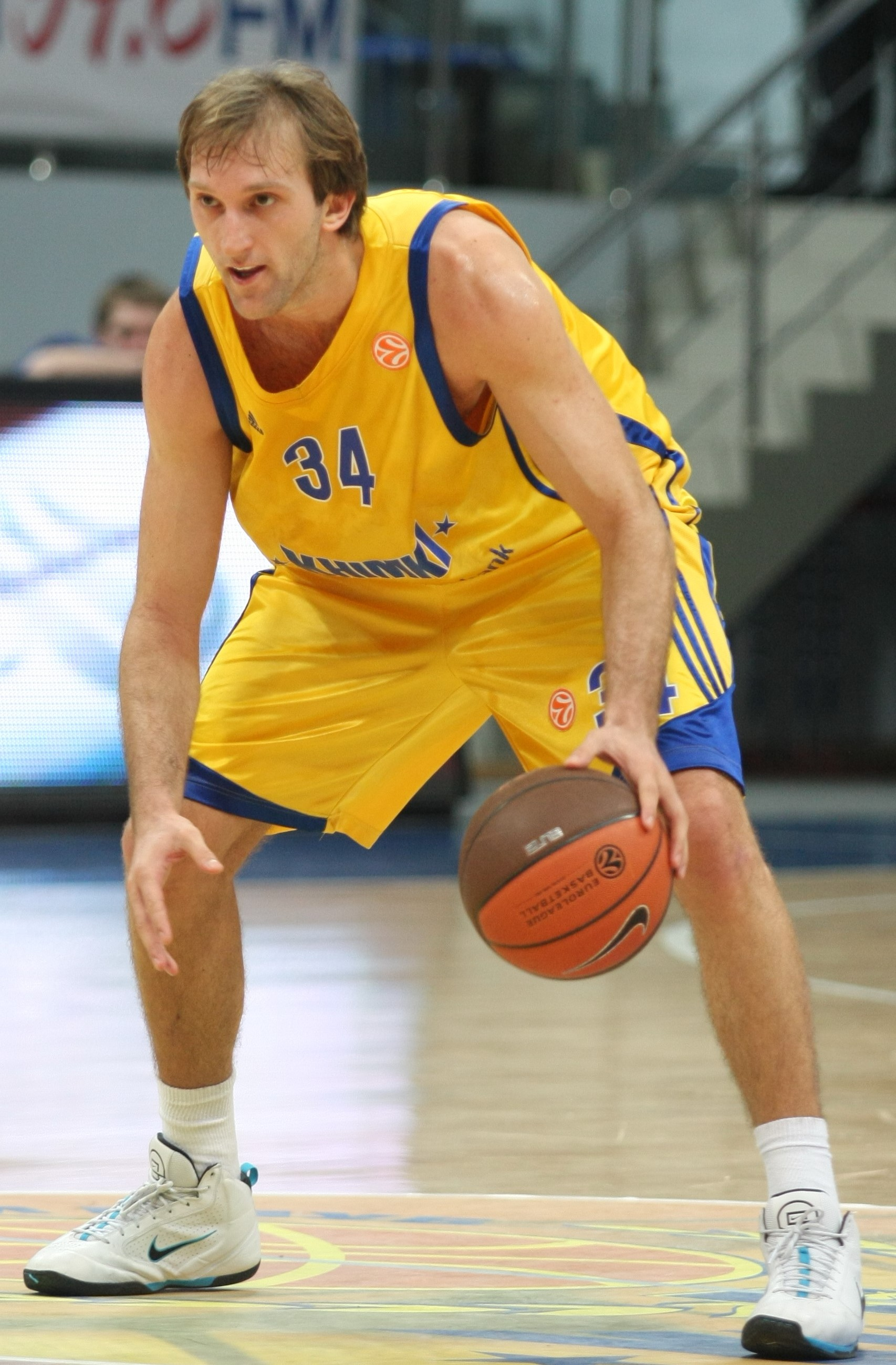
- Planinić with Khimki in 2010

Personal information
- Born: 12 September 1982 (age 44) Mostar, SR Bosnia and Herzegovina, SFR Yugoslavia
- Listed height: 6 ft 7 in (2.01 m)
- Listed weight: 195 lb (88 kg)

Career information
- NBA draft: 2003: 1st round, 22nd overall pick
- Drafted by: New Jersey Nets
- Playing career: 1999–2014
- Position: Point guard / shooting guard
- Number: 10, 34

Career history
- 1999–2000: Benston Zagreb
- 2000–2003: Cibona
- 2003–2006: New Jersey Nets
- 2006–2008: TAU Cerámica
- 2008–2010: CSKA Moscow
- 2010–2013: Khimki
- 2013–2014: Anadolu Efes

Career highlights
- EuroLeague assists leader (2013); EuroCup Finals MVP (2012); All-EuroCup First Team (2012); EuroCup champion (2012); Russian League All-Symbolic First Team (2012); Croatian League MVP (2001)
- Stats at NBA.com
- Stats at Basketball Reference
Medals
Men's basketball
Representing Croatia
FIBA U-21 World Cup
Silver medal – second place	2001 Japan	U-21 Team
FIBA U-19 World Cup
Bronze medal – third place	1999 Portugal	U-19 Team
European U-18 Championship
Silver medal – second place	2000 Croatia	U-18 Team

Zoran Planinić (born September 12, 1982) is a Croatian former professional basketball player.

== Early years ==
Planinić was born in Mostar, Bosnia and Herzegovina, in the former Yugoslavia. He started his basketball career at HKK Brotnjo Čitluk from Čitluk, Bosnia and Herzegovina and was noticed by KK Cibona where he continued his junior career.

== Professional career ==
In the 1999–2000 season, Planinić started his professional career on loan to Benston Zagreb.

He returned to Cibona Zagreb in 2000 and he was named the Croatian League MVP in 2001. He stayed with Cibona until 2003.

In the 2003 NBA draft, the 6-foot-7-inch-tall (201 cm) (in shoes), 210-pound (95 kg) point guard/shooting guard was drafted 22nd overall by the New Jersey Nets. In three NBA seasons he averaged 4 points, 1.4 rebounds and 1.1 assists per game. Planinić's three NBA seasons were not notable, with his only distinguishing moment coming in the 2005–06 season, when he hit a spectacular full-court, 77-foot, 3rd-quarter-ending buzzer beater at a home win, on 9 November 2005, against the Utah Jazz.

Planinić's final NBA game was Game 2 of the 2006 Eastern Conference Semi-finals on 10 May 2006 against the Miami Heat. New Jersey lost the game 89 - 111, with Planinić recording one assist and one steal.

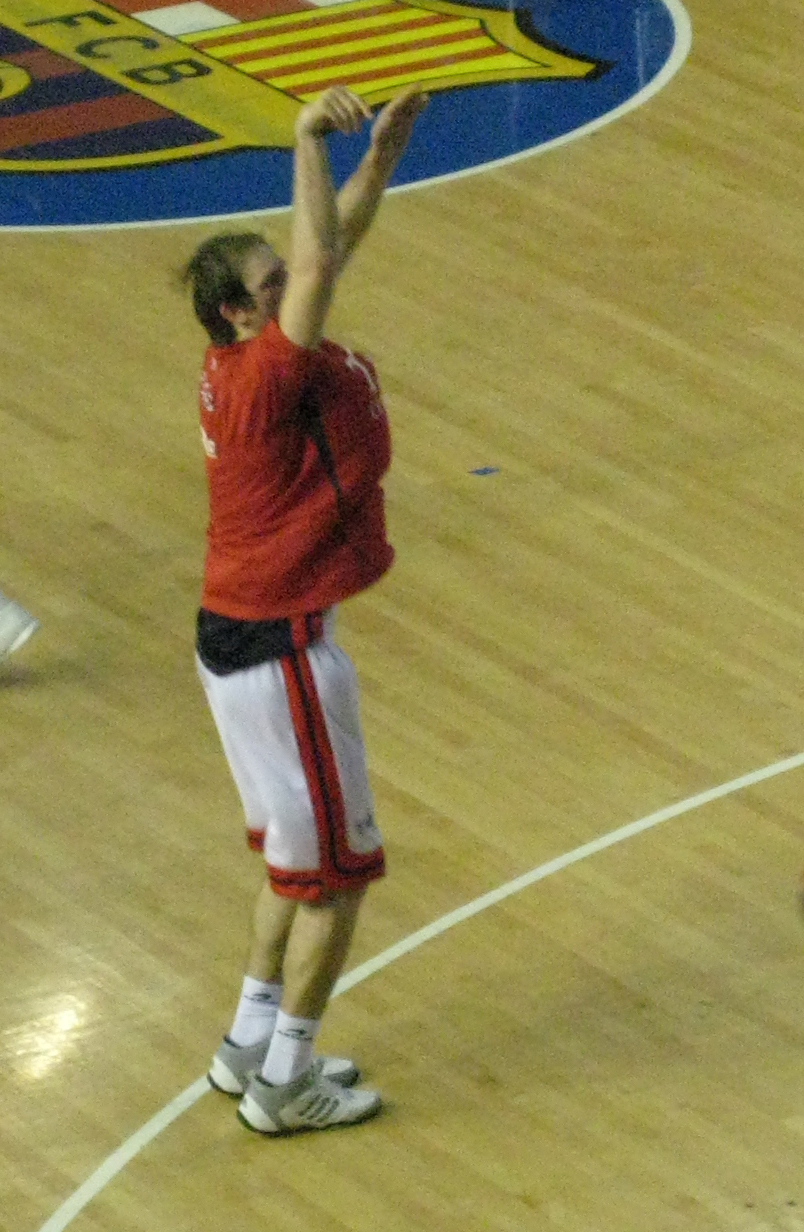
Zoran Planinić warming up in the second game of the 2008 Spanish ACB League Finals

In the summer of 2006, Planinić and the Nets agreed to a buyout, in which he was sent back to Europe to spend the season with TAU Cerámica of the Spanish ACB League, a team that also featured talented NBA prospect Tiago Splitter. With TAU Cerámica, Planinić won the Spanish Supercup championship in both 2006 and 2007, and the Spanish League championship in 2008.

On 25 June 2008 Planinić signed a two-year contract with the Russian Superleague A club CSKA Moscow. On 17 June 2010, he signed a 2+1 year contract with the Russian PBL club BC Khimki.

On 27 July 2013 he signed a two-year contract with Anadolu Efes. In January 2014, he hit a long-range buzzer beater in the last second of the game to defeat Olimpia Milano by a score of 61–60. In his first season with the team, he averaged 8.4 points and 3.7 assists, over 23 EuroLeague games. In the summer of 2014, Dušan Ivković was appointed as Efes' head coach, and Planinić lost his place in the team. Despite that, he was still under contract for the 2014–15 season.

== Career statistics ==
Legend
GP	Games played	GS	Games started	MPG	Minutes per game
FG%	Field-goal percentage	3P%	3-point field-goal percentage	FT%	Free-throw percentage
RPG	Rebounds per game	APG	Assists per game	SPG	Steals per game
BPG	Blocks per game	PPG	Points per game	PIR	Performance index rating
**Bold**	Career high

=== EuroLeague ===
*	Led the league

Year	Team	GP	GS	MPG	FG%	3P%	FT%	RPG	APG	SPG	BPG	PPG	PIR
2000–01	Cibona	5	1	16.8	.294	.000	.000	1.4	1.2	.2	.2	2.0	-1.4
2001–02	Cibona	8	7	24.8	.508	**.500**	.683	2.3	2.4	1.1	**.4**	12.1	11.0
2002–03	Cibona	18	9	22.2	.430	.235	.593	2.8	2.8	.8	.1	7.8	7.2
2006–07	Baskonia	18	11	24.2	.457	.281	.677	2.7	3.8	**1.3**	.3	9.3	11.6
2007–08	Baskonia	**25***	**23**	24.7	**.515**	.375	.662	2.8	3.1	.9	.2	10.6	12.1
2008–09	CSKA	19	4	18.7	.447	.341	.680	1.8	2.1	.5	.3	7.0	7.2
2009–10	CSKA	21	17	21.4	.455	.295	.649	2.9	2.1	1.1	.1	7.5	8.1
2010–11	Khimki	10	6	29.0	.488	.290	.710	**4.2**	3.1	.9	.2	11.1	13.2
2012–13	Khimki	22	22	**30.8**	.447	.164	.667	3.9	**6.3***	1.1	.1	**12.4**	**15.2**
2013–14	Anadolu Efes	23	9	23.5	.394	.298	**.737**	2.4	3.7	.9	.0	8.4	7.4
Career		169	109	24.0	.453	.289	.668	2.8	3.3	.9	.2	9.3	9.8

== Croatian national team ==
Planinić was part of the Croatian junior national teams that won the bronze medal at the 1999 FIBA Under-19 World Cup and the silver medal at the 2001 FIBA Under-21 World Cup.

Planinić was also a part of the senior men's Croatian national basketball teams at EuroBaskets 2003, 2005, 2007 and 2009.

== Personal life ==
Ivica Zubac, who plays for the Indiana Pacers as of 2026, is Planinić's cousin.
