= Carver Engineering and Science =

Secondary school in Philadelphia, Pennsylvania

Coordinates: 39.98346°N 75.16109°W

- 1600 West Norris Street; Philadelphia, Pennsylvania 19121; United States

Information
- Other name: George Washington Carver School of Engineering and Science
- Former names: George Washington Carver High School of Engineering and Science, Carver High School of Engineering and Science, High School of Engineering and Science
- Type: Public School
- Established: 1979
- Founder: Alvin Garblik
- School district: School District of Philadelphia
- Principal: Darryl Johnson
- Grades: 7-12
- Language: English
- Website: https://hses.philasd.org/

Carver Engineering and Science (formerly George Washington Carver High School of Engineering and Science) is a secondary school in Philadelphia, Pennsylvania.

== Description ==
Carver Engineering and Science, which is operated by the School District of Philadelphia, handles grades 7 through 12. Carver Engineering and Science is a magnet school with a curriculum that specializes in science and technology, including a middle school program with 60 spaces for 8th grade and 60 spaces for 7th grade. The goal of the curriculum is to produce graduates who will be successful in their pursuit of higher education in specific subjects.

The High School of Engineering and Science was a dream of its founder and principal Dr. Alvin Garblik. The first class began in 1979, and had a strict dress code and curriculum.

Those that were in the first class attended classes in Stauffer Hall, a ten-story building no longer in existence, then located at the Southeast corner of Broad Street and Columbia Avenue (now Cecil B. Moore Avenue) on the Temple University campus. The school moved between the 1982–83 and 1983-84 school years to its current 17th and Norris location, which had previously been the George Washington Carver Elementary School.

It was Dr. Garblik's belief that students should come to school dressed and act in a way that modeled real life in the business world. Five years later, a student made a call to the ACLU, who had the requirement that boys wear neckties withdrawn, explaining to the administration at the time that they were violating the Philadelphia Public Schools Charter.

The first year students enjoyed higher end classes learning advanced Chinese, physics and computer sciences.

"High School of Engineering and Science is a small, nurturing, special-admissions school, seeking to attract academically-talented students who have an interest in science, engineering and technology." --- The mission statement of High School of Engineering & Science

The School as of 2019, has also received 2 blue ribbon awards of excellence.

The principal is Darryl Johnson.

== Notable people ==
- Michael Anderson, professional basketball player
- John Cox, Venezuelan-American professional basketball player
- Gene Demby, NPR reporter and podcast host
- Lynn Greer, professional basketball player
- Keisha Hampton, WNBA basketball player
- Marc Lamont Hill (born 1978), academic, television personality
- Brittany Hrynko, WNBA basketball player

== See also ==
- George Washington Carver
