= Lynn Greer =

American basketball player (born 1979)

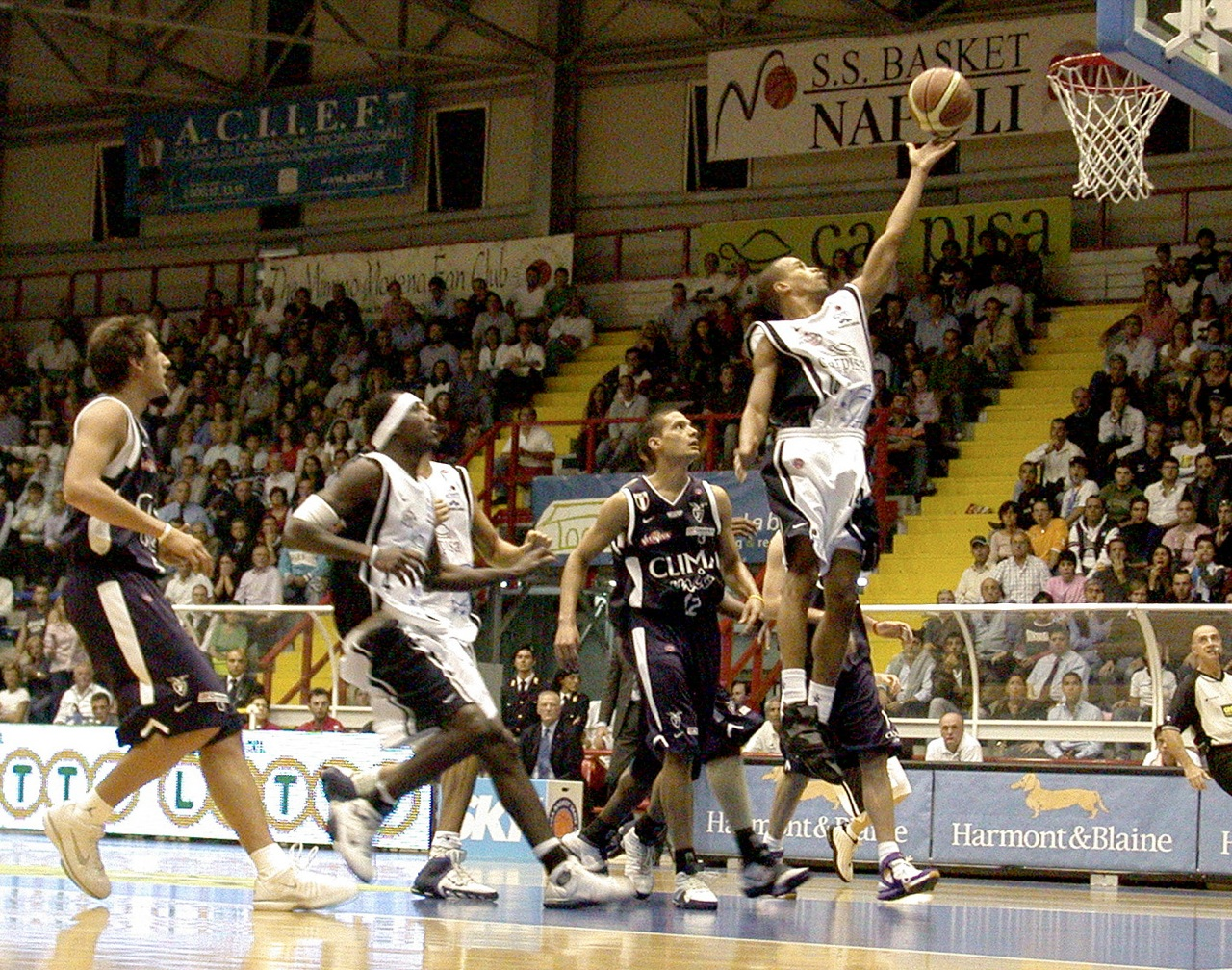
- Lynn Greer making a layup for Carpisa Napoli, in 2005

Personal information
- Born: October 23, 1979 (age 47) Philadelphia, Pennsylvania, U.S.
- Listed height: 6 ft 1 in (1.85 m)
- Listed weight: 180 lb (82 kg)

Career information
- High school: Carver (Philadelphia, Pennsylvania)
- College: Temple (1997–2002)
- NBA draft: 2002: undrafted
- Playing career: 2002–2015
- Position: Point guard / shooting guard

Career history
- 2002–2003: Near East
- 2003: Greenville Groove
- 2003–2004: Śląsk Wrocław
- 2004–2005: Dynamo Moscow
- 2005–2006: Carpisa Napoli
- 2006–2007: Milwaukee Bucks
- 2007–2009: Olympiacos Piraeus
- 2009–2011: Fenerbahçe Ülker
- 2011: Olimpia Milano
- 2011–2012: UNICS Kazan
- 2012–2013: Azovmash
- 2013–2015: Darüşşafaka Doğuş

Career highlights
- EuroLeague Top Scorer (2004); All-EuroLeague Second Team (2004); LBA MVP (2006); LBA Top Scorer (2006); Italian Cup winner (2006); Greek Cup Finals Top Scorer (2008); Ukrainian Super League assists leader (2013); All-Ukrainian Super League First Team (2013); 2× All-Greek League Second Team (2008, 2009); Turkish Super League champion (2010); Turkish Cup winner (2010); Polish Cup winner (2004); Polish Cup MVP (2004); Robert V. Geasey Trophy winner (2002); 2× First-team All-Atlantic 10 (2001, 2002)
- Stats at NBA.com
- Stats at Basketball Reference
Medals
Men's basketball
Representing the United States
Summer Universiade
Bronze medal – third place	2001 Beijing

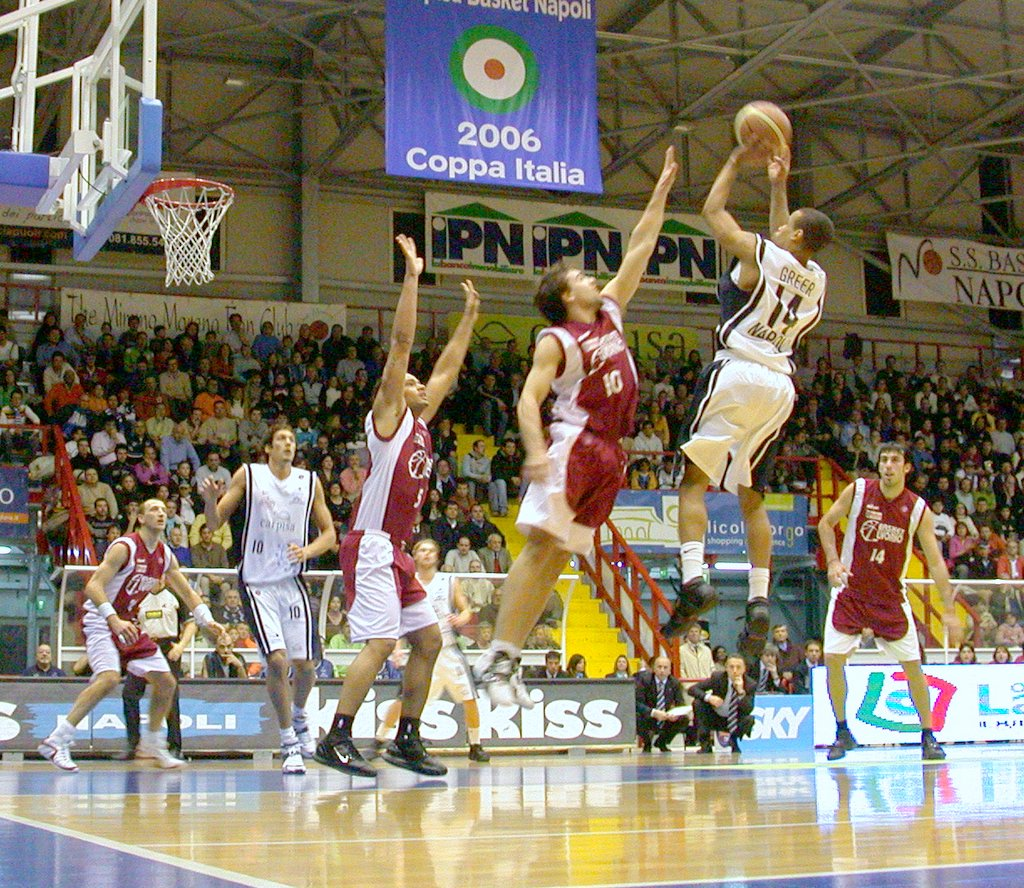
Lynn Greer shooting, during the 2006 Italian Cup

Lynn Terence Greer Jr. (born October 23, 1979) is an American former professional basketball player. He played at the point guard and shooting guard positions. He was an All-EuroLeague Second Team selection in 2004.

== High school ==
Lynn attended Carver High School, in Philadelphia, Pennsylvania, where he played basketball.

== College career ==
Greer attended Temple University, where he played college basketball for John Chaney's Owls. In his senior year, he averaged 39.7 minutes per game, and also led the Owls with 23.2 points per game, including a career high 47 points, in a 70–67 OT victory against Wisconsin. He led the Owls to the Elite Eight in 2001, where they lost a tightly contested game to #1 seed Michigan State. Greer is Temple's second-all-time-leading scorer.

== Professional career ==
Prior to his NBA career, Greer played professionally in the Italian League, the Russian Super League, the Polish League, and the Greek League, and also with the then-named NBA D-League's Greenville Groove. In July 2006, he was signed to a multi-year contract by the NBA's Milwaukee Bucks, a team he played with in the pre-season of 2003.

Greer's only time in the NBA was during the 2006 - 2007 season with the Bucks. He played a total of 41 games in his career, averaging 4.1 points and 1.3 assists. His final NBA game was played on April 18, 2007, in a 96 - 109 loss to the Cleveland Cavaliers where he recorded 5 points, 2 assists and 1 rebound.

On September 24, 2007, Greer signed a two-year deal with Olympiacos Piraeus. In the Greek League 2007–08 regular season, he averaged 12.4 points per game, in 24.1 minutes per game. In the 2007–08 Greek League post season, he played in 12 games, where he averaged 14.9 points per game, in 30.3 minutes per game, while also dishing out 2.7 assists per game. Finally, in 19 games in the Euroleague 2007–08 season, he averaged 16.3 points per game and 3.6 assists per game. In 2009, he transferred to Fenerbahçe Ülker. In January 2011, he joined Armani Jeans Milano. On October 4, 2011, he signed with UNICS Kazan. On August 16, 2012, he joined BC Azovmash in Ukraine. In August 2013, he signed with Darüşşafaka.

On June 25, 2015, Greer announced his retirement from professional basketball.

== Personal life ==
Greer is the son of Lynn Greer Sr., who was drafted by the Phoenix Suns in the 11th round (170th overall) of the 1973 NBA draft, and Alma Greer. Greer grew up in Southwest Philadelphia, and played against many NBA players, including Kobe Bryant, Jameer Nelson, Ronald "Flip" Murray, Rasheed Wallace, Richard "Rip" Hamilton, Malik Rose, Malik Allen, and Cuttino Mobley.

Greer's son, Lynn Greer III, was a four-star recruit at IMG Academy in Florida. He committed to play basketball for the Dayton Flyers on February 15, 2021. However he transferred to Saint Joseph's in January 2022.
