= Terrell McIntyre =

American basketball player

Personal information
- Born: October 18, 1977 (age 49) Fayetteville, North Carolina, U.S.
- Listed height: 5 ft 9.25 in (1.76 m)
- Listed weight: 185 lb (84 kg)

Career information
- High school: Hoke County (Raeford, North Carolina)
- College: Clemson (1995–1999)
- NBA draft: 1999: undrafted
- Playing career: 1999–2011
- Position: Point guard
- Coaching career: 1999–2011

Career history
- 1999–2000: BCM Gravelines
- 2000–2001: Braunschweig
- 2001–2003: Fayetteville Patriots
- 2003–2004: Ferrara
- 2004–2005: Orlandina
- 2005–2006: Reggiana
- 2006–2010: Mens Sana Siena
- 2010–2011: Unicaja Málaga
- 2011: Virtus Bologna

Career highlights
- 2× All-EuroLeague First Team (2008, 2009); 4× Lega Serie A champion (2007–2010); 2× Italian Cup winner (2009, 2010); 3× Italian SuperCup winner (2007–2009); 2× Lega Serie A MVP (2007, 2009); 3× Lega Serie A Finals MVP (2008–2010); Italian SuperCup MVP (2008); No. 5 retired by Montepaschi Siena; All-NBDL Second Team (2002); 2× Second-team All-ACC (1997, 1999); Third-team All-ACC (1998)

Lance Terrell McIntyre (born October 18, 1977) is a retired American professional basketball player. Standing at 5'9 1/4" (1.76 m), he played at the point guard position. A two-time All-EuroLeague First Team selection, he reached the EuroLeague Final Four in 2008, with Montepaschi Siena.

== College career ==
McIntyre played college basketball for Clemson University's basketball team, the Clemson Tigers. The diminutive point guard left his mark on the history books of the college, and is still considered one of its best players of all time. McIntyre is the second leading scorer in the history of Clemson basketball. As a freshman, he averaged 12.7 points and 3 assists per game. As a sophomore, McIntyre became the leading point guard for Clemson, averaging 13.4 points and 4.4 assists per game. The next year, as a junior, he averaged 14 points per game and improved his shooting percentage dramatically, jumping from 42% shooting from the field, to 50% shooting from the field. He also improved his defense by adding some weight, which helped him to get more steals (2 per game) and rebounds (3 per game). McIntyre had his best year at Clemson as a senior. He was able to lead Clemson to the final game of the 1999 National Invitation Tournament, and he also performed excellently on the stat sheets. McIntyre scored 18 points, dished 5.3 assists and made almost three 3 pointers per game (at a 40% rate) in his senior season.

== Professional career ==
=== Europe ===
After he went undrafted in the 1999 NBA draft, McIntyre decided to play overseas. His first stop was the French Pro A club Gravelines. He played only 14 games for the French club. His averages were 19 points (53% field goals, 2.2 made 3s), 5.6 assists and 3.2 rebounds per game. After that year, McIntyre moved to the German League, in order to play for the small club of Braunschweig. McIntyre played 15 games with Braunschweig, averaging 18.5 points and 7 assists per game.

=== US period ===
After playing in Germany, McIntyre decided to move back to the United States, and signed with the Fayetteville Patriots in the NBA D-League. His performance that year, 15.3 points and 4.9 assists per game, helped him get to the NBA Summer League, and sign a contract with the New Orleans Hornets. However, he was waived before the regular season started and came back to Fayetteville, where he averaged 12.3 points, 5.1 assists and 1.4 steals per game. Unable to again draw interest for another NBA contract, McIntyre decided to go back to Europe and play in Italy.

=== Return to Europe ===
McIntyre's career in Italy started in the Italian Second Division. He signed a contract with Carife Ferrera, for the 2003–04 season. He averaged 17.5 points (54.6% 2FG, 46% on 3.3 made 3 pointers per game) and 3.6 assists per game. He then signed with the Italian 2nd Division club Capo d'Orlando the next year, and averaged 18.7 points and 4.7 assists per game with them. He then moved to Reggio Emilia, and played with them in the Italian First Division, in the 2005–06 season. He had his first chance to compete in the second highest level of Europe, by playing with the team in the ULEB Cup (EuroCup) competition. McIntyre averaged 16.9 points (46% 2FG and 43% from 3, including 3 made 3 pointers per game) and 4.2 assists per game in the Italian League, and 15.1 points and 4.2 assists per game in the ULEB Cup. The next year, McIntyre joined the Italian club Montepaschi Siena.

In his first year with Siena, he began the year coming off the bench, and played in the club's 6th man role, backing up both Joseph Forte and Rimantas Kaukėnas. During the season, McIntyre became the club's starting point guard. His shooting touch and excellent defense played a major key, alongside his great leadership skills, in helping Siena win the Italian League championship. He averaged 11 points and 2.8 assists per game with Montepaschi in the ULEB Cup. The next season, he averaged 13.8 points (3 made 3 pointers per game), 4.9 assists and 2.5 steals per game in Europe's premier level EuroLeague, and he helped Siena make it to the EuroLeague Final Four, where they lost in the semifinals to Maccabi Tel Aviv. McIntyre was then sought after by several EuroLeague clubs, but a huge buy-out mark in his contract kept him in Siena for the 2008–09 season. In the EuroLeague 2008–09 season, McIntyre averaged 17.3 points (69% 2FG, 40% on 3 PT FG), 4.4 assists and 1.7 steals per game.

He signed a 2-year contract with the Spanish ACB League club Unicaja Málaga, in 2010. In July 2011, he returned to Italy, after signing a two-year contract with Virtus Bologna.

=== Retirement ===
In November 2011, McIntyre announced his retirement from playing professional basketball, due to a bad hip injury.

== Player profile ==
At only 5'9 1/4" (1.76 m) tall, McIntyre played with good energy and feel for the game, which he used to helped Montepaschi Siena win titles in Italy, like the Italian League championships in 2007, 2008, 2009, and 2010. McIntyre earned All-EuroLeague First Team selections for the EuroLeague 2007–08 and EuroLeague 2008–09 seasons, and in that era, he was considered to be one of the best point guards in Europe.

== Career statistics ==
Legend
GP	Games played	GS	Games started	MPG	Minutes per game
FG%	Field-goal percentage	3P%	3-point field-goal percentage	FT%	Free-throw percentage
RPG	Rebounds per game	APG	Assists per game	SPG	Steals per game
BPG	Blocks per game	PPG	Points per game	PIR	Performance index rating
**Bold**	Career high

=== EuroLeague ===
Year	Team	GP	GS	MPG	FG%	3P%	FT%	RPG	APG	SPG	BPG	PPG	PIR
2007–08	Montepaschi Siena	**24**	**23**	30.1	.419	.403	**.929**	2.0	4.9	**2.5**	.0	13.8	14.3
2008–09	Montepaschi Siena	19	19	**30.2**	**.512**	.395	.905	**2.5**	4.4	1.7	.0	**17.3**	**19.8**
2009–10	Montepaschi Siena	16	16	26.9	.438	**.412**	.865	1.9	**5.1**	1.9	.0	12.5	14.1
2010–11	Unicaja Málaga	10	6	21.8	.246	.234	.923	.9	2.8	.6	.0	5.7	1.7
Career		69	64	28.2	.434	.385	.904	2.0	4.5	1.9	.0	13.3	14.0

== Awards and accomplishments ==
- 4× Italian League Champion: (2007, 2008, 2009, 2010)
- 2× Italian League MVP: 2007, 2009
- 3× Italian SuperCup Winner: (2007, 2008, 2009)
- 2× All-EuroLeague First Team: (2008, 2009)
- 3× Italian League Finals MVP: (2008, 2009, 2010)
- Italian SuperCup MVP: (2008)
- 2× Italian Cup Winner: (2009, 2010)
- Number 5 jersey retired by Montepaschi Siena
