= Terence Morris =

American basketball player (born 1979)

- Morris with FC Barcelona in 2011

Personal information
- Born: January 11, 1979 (age 47) Frederick, Maryland, U.S.
- Listed height: 6 ft 9 in (2.06 m)
- Listed weight: 240 lb (109 kg)

Career information
- High school: Governor Thomas Johnson (Frederick, Maryland)
- College: Maryland (1997–2001)
- NBA draft: 2001: 2nd round, 34th overall pick
- Drafted by: Atlanta Hawks
- Playing career: 2001–2011
- Position: Power forward
- Number: 44, 40, 23

Career history
- 2001–2003: Houston Rockets
- 2003–2004: Columbus Riverdragons
- 2004–2005: Apollon Patras
- 2005–2006: Orlando Magic
- 2006–2007: Hapoel Jerusalem
- 2007–2008: Maccabi Tel Aviv
- 2008–2009: CSKA Moscow
- 2009–2011: FC Barcelona

Career highlights
- EuroLeague champion (2010); All-EuroLeague First Team (2008); 2× Israeli League Defensive Player of the Year (2007, 2008); All-Israeli League Team (2008); Israeli Cup winner (2007); Liga ACB champion (2011); 2× Catalan League champion (2010, 2011); Catalan League Finals MVP (2010); Russian League champion (2009); VTB United League champion (2008); First-team All-ACC (1999); Second-team All-ACC (2000); Third-team All-ACC (2001); Fourth-team Parade All-American (1997)
- Stats at NBA.com
- Stats at Basketball Reference

Terence Darea Morris (born January 11, 1979) is an American former professional basketball player. He was twice the Israeli Basketball Premier League Defensive Player of the Year, in 2007 and 2008. He was an All-EuroLeague First Team selection in 2008.

== High school career ==
Terence Morris played his high school basketball for Governor Thomas Johnson High School in Frederick, Maryland, leading the TJ Patriots to the Maryland Class 3A state title as a senior in 1997. He played under former TJ Patriots coach Tom Dickman, who until recently was the record holder for wins by a public school coach in Maryland with 592 wins in 29 seasons.

== College career ==
A 6 ft 9 1/2 in (2.07 m) forward from the University of Maryland, College Park, Morris was hailed as one of the best prospects in all of college basketball after his sophomore season in 1998–99. But while the consensus was that he would have been a Top-5 pick in the 1999 NBA draft had he left school after that year along with teammate Steve Francis, Morris instead opted to return to Maryland for his junior and senior seasons, and his draft stock dropped after two less individually successful campaigns. Morris helped play Maryland to the first Final Four in school history during the 2001 NCAA Men's Division I Basketball Tournament to cap his senior season.

== Professional career ==
=== NBA ===
Morris was eventually selected by the Atlanta Hawks with the 33rd pick of the 2001 NBA draft, and his draft rights were immediately traded to the Houston Rockets, with whom he played two seasons (2001–2003). He then spent the 2003–04 season in the NBDL with the Columbus Riverdragons (now known as the Austin Spurs), and signed with the Los Angeles Clippers in September, 2004, but was waived before the season started. He signed with the Orlando Magic in September 2005. He earned a roster spot for the remainder of the season, but was again waived in February 2006.

Morris' final NBA game was played on February 14, 2006, in a 93 - 107 loss to the Miami Heat where Morris only played for 37 seconds and recorded no stats.

=== Europe ===
After being waived by the Los Angeles Clippers in 2004, he decided to move to Europe and signed with Apollon Patras of the Greek League.

Morris began the 2006–07 season unaffiliated to a team, but in December 2006, he signed with the Israeli League club Hapoel Jerusalem until the end of the season. With Hapoel he won an Israeli State Cup.

On June 13, 2007, he signed with the EuroLeague club Maccabi Tel Aviv. He was twice the Israeli Basketball Premier League Defensive Player of the Year, in 2007 and 2008. On May 3, 2008, Morris won a place in the 2007–08 All-EuroLeague First team as a result of his play and the fact that his team reached the EuroLeague Final.

He then transferred to the Russian Super League club CSKA Moscow and he reached another EuroLeague competition final in the 2008–09 season. In 2009, he joined the Spanish ACB League club FC Barcelona, with whom he won his first EuroLeague competition in 2010. He left Barcelona after two seasons, and announced his retirement.

== Career statistics ==
Legend
GP	Games played	GS	Games started	MPG	Minutes per game
FG%	Field-goal percentage	3P%	3-point field-goal percentage	FT%	Free-throw percentage
RPG	Rebounds per game	APG	Assists per game	SPG	Steals per game
BPG	Blocks per game	PPG	Points per game	PIR	Performance index rating
**Bold**	Career high

=== NBA ===
==== Regular season ====
Year	Team	GP	GS	MPG	FG%	3P%	FT%	RPG	APG	SPG	BPG	PPG
2001–02	Houston	**68**	**12**	**16.3**	.384	.192	.643	**3.1**	**.9**	**.3**	**.4**	**3.8**
2002–03	Houston	49	0	12.9	**.466**	**.219**	.786	2.6	.5	.2	.3	3.7
2005–06	Orlando	22	0	8.7	.327	.000	**1.000**	1.7	.2	**.3**	.2	1.6
Career		139	12	13.9	.407	.196	.711	2.7	.7	.3	.4	3.4

=== EuroLeague ===
†	Denotes season in which Morris won the EuroLeague
*	Led the league

Year	Team	GP	GS	MPG	FG%	3P%	FT%	RPG	APG	SPG	BPG	PPG	PIR
2007–08	Maccabi	**25***	**19**	**30.2**	.575	.492	.730	**8.3**	**1.6**	.6	**1.8**	**12.4**	**17.8**
2008–09	CSKA Moscow	21	9	20.7	.524	**.500**	.529	4.9	1.1	.5	1.0	6.7	9.5
2009–10†	Barcelona	21	11	19.8	**.591**	.415	**.810**	3.8	.6	**.8**	1.0	7.1	10.2
2010–11	Barcelona	20	4	19.5	.442	.344	.692	4.1	.7	.7	.6	6.6	7.5
Career		87	43	22.9	.540	.432	.705	5.4	1.0	.7	1.1	8.4	11.6
