= DeJuan Collins =

American basketball player (born 1976)

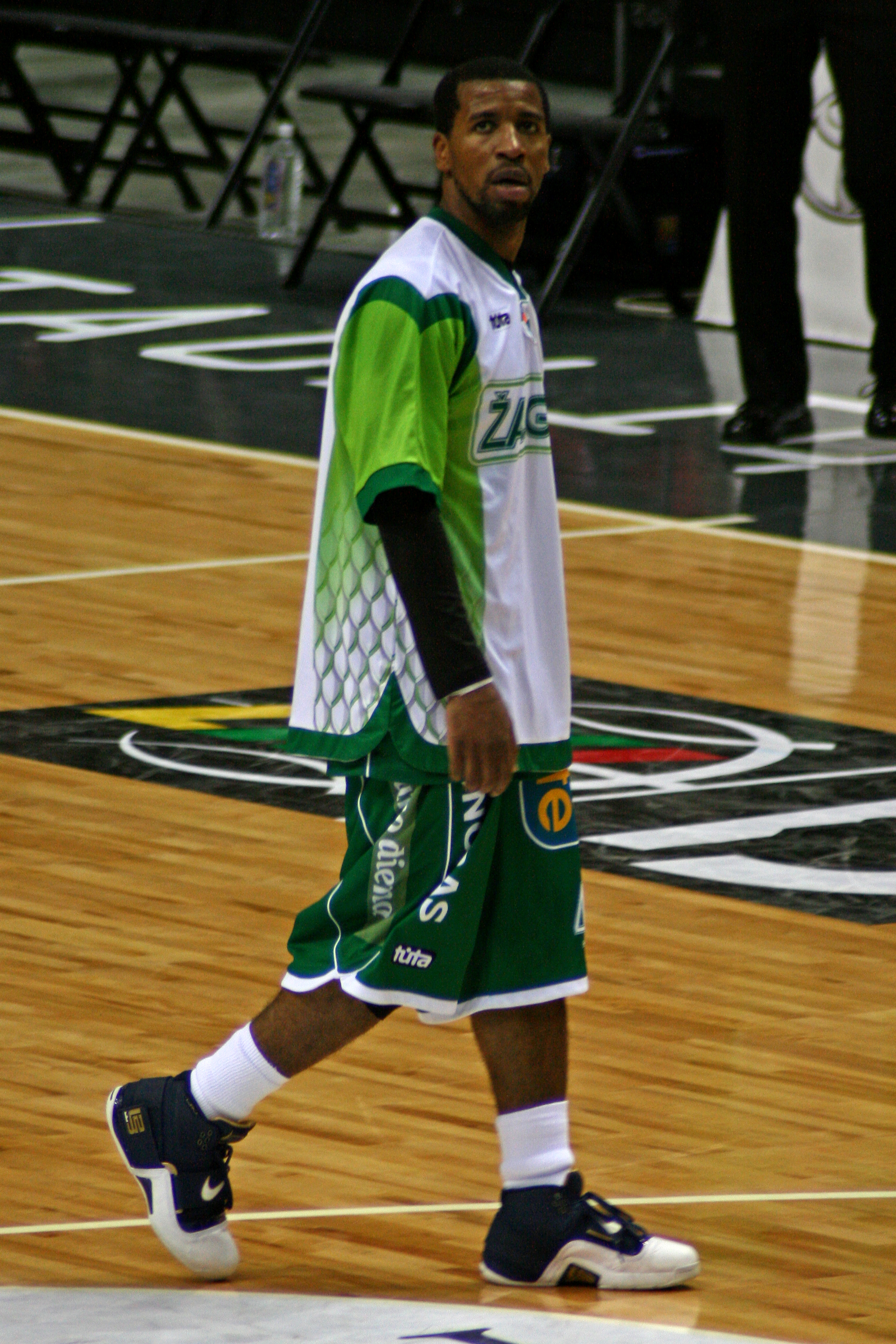
- Collins as a member of Žalgiris

Personal information
- Born: November 20, 1976 (age 49) Youngstown, Ohio, U.S.
- Listed height: 6 ft 2 in (1.88 m)
- Listed weight: 190 lb (86 kg)

Career information
- College: Tuskegee (1994–1997); LSU (1997–1998)
- NBA draft: 1998: undrafted
- Playing career: 2000–2013
- Position: Point guard / shooting guard

Career history
- 2000–2002: Tübingen
- 2002–2004: Alba Berlin
- 2004–2005: Aris Thessaloniki
- 2005–2006: Varese
- 2006–2007: Brose Bamberg
- 2007–2008: Žalgiris Kaunas
- 2008: Lokomotiv Rostov
- 2008–2009: Cajasol
- 2009–2010: Kavala
- 2010–2012: Žalgiris Kaunas
- 2012: Al Riyadi Beirut
- 2013: Krasnye Krylia

Career highlights
- FIBA EuroChallenge champion (2013); Greek Cup Finals Top Scorer (2005); Greek League All-Star (2005); Russian Cup winner (2013); German League champion (2003); German League Top Scorer (2002); 4× Lithuanian League champion (2007, 2008, 2011, 2012); 3× Lithuanian LKF Cup winner (2008, 2011, 2012); 3× Baltic BBL champion (2008, 2011, 2012); Baltic BBL Finals MVP (2008); EuroLeague assists leader (2008); EuroLeague records since the 2000–01 season: Most 2-point field goals made in a game without a miss

DeJuan Collins (born November 20, 1976) is an American former professional basketball player. He was listed at 6 ft 2 in (1.88 m) in height, and 190 pounds (86 kg) in weight. Collins was best known as a scorer, and also for organizing and leading his team's game on offense.

== College career ==
Collins, or "DC" as fans and friends simply call him, began his career at Louisiana State University (LSU) (NCAA Division I) and later played at the Tuskegee Institute (NCAA Division II).

== Professional career ==
A second-division club, WiredMinds Tübingen, part of the German Bundesliga, was Collins' first professional adventure. Led by his team-high 26 points per game, Tübingen was able to win promotion in the 2000–01 season. The biggest surprise of the entire season was their first-round German Cup upset of Alba Berlin. Even though Collins had to play against better teams in the first division, the following season he was able to continue his great performances. He was the top scorer with 23.6 points per game in his first year in the first Bundesliga and he was invited to the All-Star game, subsequently switching to Alba where, in 2002–03, he won the German Championship and the German Cup.

In the 2004–05 season, he played for Aris Salonica and in 2005–06 for Varese Whirlpool. Since halfway through 2006–07, he played for Žalgiris Kaunas, winning the Lithuanian Basketball League (LKL) in 2007 and 2008.

After the season ended he chose a better contract offered by Lokomotiv Rostov for the 2008–09 season. He was released in November 2008. His last club was in Russia, playing for Krasnye Krylia. With Krylia, Collins won the FIBA EuroChallenge.

== Career statistics ==
Legend
GP	Games played	GS	Games started	MPG	Minutes per game
FG%	Field-goal percentage	3P%	3-point field-goal percentage	FT%	Free-throw percentage
RPG	Rebounds per game	APG	Assists per game	SPG	Steals per game
BPG	Blocks per game	PPG	Points per game	PIR	Performance index rating
**Bold**	Career high

=== EuroLeague ===
*	Led the league

Year	Team	GP	GS	MPG	FG%	3P%	FT%	RPG	APG	SPG	BPG	PPG	PIR
2002–03	Berlin	8	8	27.4	.434	.310	.667	3.6	2.6	**1.5**	**.5**	16.1	12.4
2003–04	Berlin	14	14	33.6	**.467**	.298	.778	4.2	2.5	1.3	.2	**16.6**	**16.0**
2006–07	Žalgiris	2	2	**36.0**	.429	.000	.714	3.5	4.0	**1.5**	—	8.5	10.0
2007–08	Žalgiris	**20**	**20**	29.9	.384	.211	.830	**3.9**	**5.4***	1.3	—	10.9	14.9
2010–11	Žalgiris	16	8	20.4	.420	.333	.837	2.1	2.3	1.3	.1	6.7	8.4
2011–12	Žalgiris	12	1	15.1	.426	**.370**	**.952**	1.3	1.5	.1	—	6.3	5.7
Career		72	53	25.9	.426	.285	.799	3.1	3.1	1.1	.1	10.8	11.7
