= Jeremiah Massey =

American basketball player (born 1982)

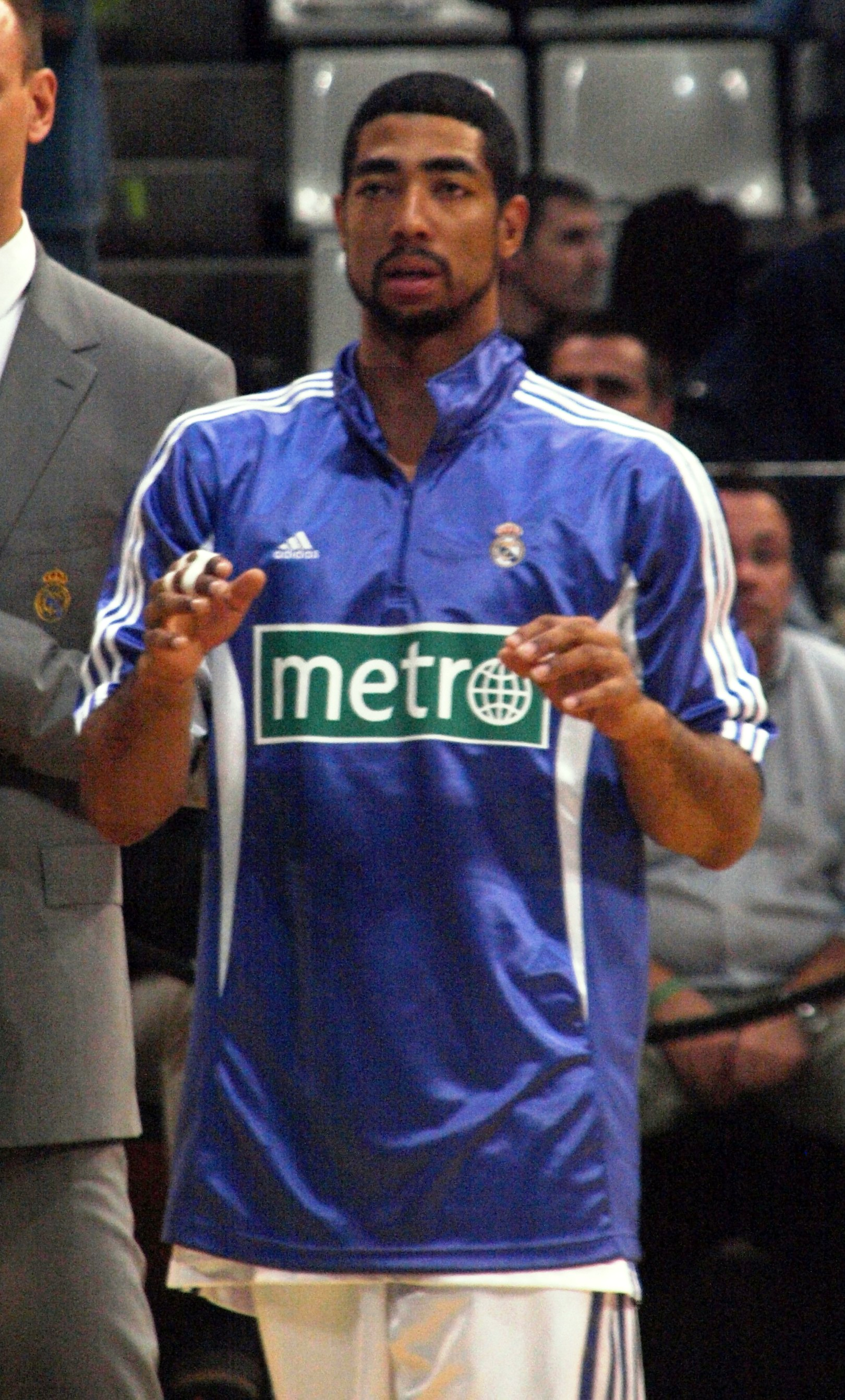
- Massey warming up with Real Madrid in 2008

Personal information
- Born: July 22, 1982 (age 44) Detroit, Michigan, U.S.
- Listed height: 6 ft 8 in (2.03 m)
- Listed weight: 235 lb (107 kg)

Career information
- High school: Mackenzie (Detroit, Michigan)
- College: Oxnard (2001–2003); Kansas State (2003–2005)
- NBA draft: 2005: undrafted
- Playing career: 2005–2020
- Position: Power forward / center

Career history
- 2005–2006: Gymnastikos S. Larissas
- 2006–2008: Aris
- 2008–2010: Real Madrid
- 2010: Obradoiro
- 2010–2012: Lokomotiv Kuban
- 2012: Krasnye Krylia
- 2012–2013: Brose Baskets
- 2013: Champville
- 2013–2014: Amchit Club
- 2014–2016: Sporting Al Riyadi Beirut
- 2016: Al-Gharafa
- 2016: Libertad de Sunchales
- 2016: MZT Skopje
- 2016–2017: Libertad de Sunchales
- 2017–2018: Quimsa
- 2018–2019: Ciclista Olímpico
- 2019: Bauru
- 2019–2020: Urunday
- 2020: Ciclista Olímpico

Career highlights
- All-EuroCup Second Team (2012); 2× All-Russian League Symbolic Team (2011, 2012); Russian League All-Star (2011); All-VTB United League Second Team (2012); 2× Greek All-Star (2007, 2008); Greek All-Star Game MVP (2008); All-Greek League Team (2008)

Jeremiah Massey (Macedonian: Џеремаја Мејси; born July 22, 1982) is an American-born naturalized Macedonian former professional basketball player. Standing at 6 ft 7 1/2 in (2.02 m), he played at the power forward and center positions during his professional career.

== College career ==
Massey started his collegiate career at Oxnard Community College where he earned California State Junior College Player of the Year Award. He then transferred to play college basketball at Kansas State University, where he earned the Big 12 Conference newcomer of the year honor in 2004. He was named to the 3rd and 2nd All Big 12 teams in 2004 and 2005 respectively.

== Professional career ==
Massey was selected 5th overall in the 2005 USBL draft. He started his professional basketball career in 2005 playing for Gymnastikos S. Larissas, a team in the Greek League. In the 2005–06 season he was the leading rebounder in the Greek League. This was the main reason why he was acquired by Aris, one of the top 3 teams in the Greek League, prior to the 2006–07 season.

Massey signed a two-year contract extension through the year 2009 with his club Aris in the summer of 2007, but Aris sold him to Real Madrid in 2008, where he signed a three-year contract.

In January 2010, his contract with Real Madrid was terminated by the club under mutual consent, and in February 2010, Massey signed for Obradoiro CAB, to replace Marc Jackson after his retirement. On May 14, 2010, he parted ways with Obradoiro.

In August 2010, he signed a one-year contract with the Russian team PBC Lokomotiv-Kuban. On July 28, 2011, he re-signed with Lokomotiv for one more season. He was named to the All-EuroCup Second Team in 2012. In the summer of 2012, after club decided not to extend his contract, he became a free agent.

In November 2012, Massey signed a six-week contract with Krasnye Krylia of the PBL. Later, in December 2012, he signed for Brose Baskets Bamberg of Germany. Massey was suspended for being undisciplined the last few weeks while he was still with Brose Baskets. In early May 2013, he signed with Champville of Lebanon for the rest of the season.

In December 2013, he signed with Amchit Club for the 2013–14 season. He helped them to make it to the semifinals. In 23 games he averaged 21 points, 8.6 rebounds, 5.5 assists and 2.9 steals per game. In November 2014, he signed with Sporting Al Riyadi Beirut.

After a short stint in Qatar with Al-Gharafa, on April 22, 2016, he signed in Argentina with Libertad de Sunchales of the Liga Nacional de Básquet.

On August 10, 2016, Massey signed with Macedonian club MZT Skopje for the 2016–17 season. On October 10, 2016, he parted ways with MZT after appearing in only three ABA league games. On October 25, 2016, he returned to Libertad de Sunchales for the rest of the season.

On October 27, 2017, Massey signed with Quimsa for the 2017–18 season.

== National team career ==
Massey played internationally for the senior Macedonia national basketball team, after acquiring Macedonian citizenship in 2008. He has played for Macedonia in the EuroBasket 2009 qualification in September 2008, helping the team to reach the final tournament for the first time since 1999.

== EuroLeague statistics ==
Legend
| GP | Games played | GS | Games started | MPG | Minutes per game |
| FG% | Field-goal percentage | 3P% | 3-point field-goal percentage | FT% | Free-throw percentage |
| RPG | Rebounds per game | APG | Assists per game | SPG | Steals per game |
| BPG | Blocks per game | PPG | Points per game | PIR | Performance index rating |
| **Bold** | Career high |

| Year | Team | GP | GS | MPG | FG% | 3P% | FT% | RPG | APG | SPG | BPG | PPG | PIR |
|---|---|---|---|---|---|---|---|---|---|---|---|---|---|
| 2006–07 | Aris | **20** | 15 | 30.1 | .470 | .214 | **.795** | 7.4 | **1.4** | **1.9** | .8 | 12.3 | 18.3 |
| 2007–08 | Aris | **20** | **20** | **32.7** | .530 | .200 | .642 | **8.4** | .9 | 1.5 | **1.2** | **17.0** | **21.0** |
| 2008–09 | Real Madrid | **20** | 9 | 21.1 | **.541** | **.316** | .565 | 4.1 | .6 | .7 | .2 | 8.2 | 8.9 |
| 2012–13 | Brose Baskets | 5 | 4 | 18.2 | .314 | .200 | .750 | 2.8 | .6 | 1.2 | 1.0 | 6.2 | 5.8 |
| Career | | 65 | 48 | 27.2 | .501 | .231 | .685 | 6.4 | .9 | 1.3 | .8 | 12.0 | 15.3 |
