= Igor Rakočević =

Serbian basketball player and executive

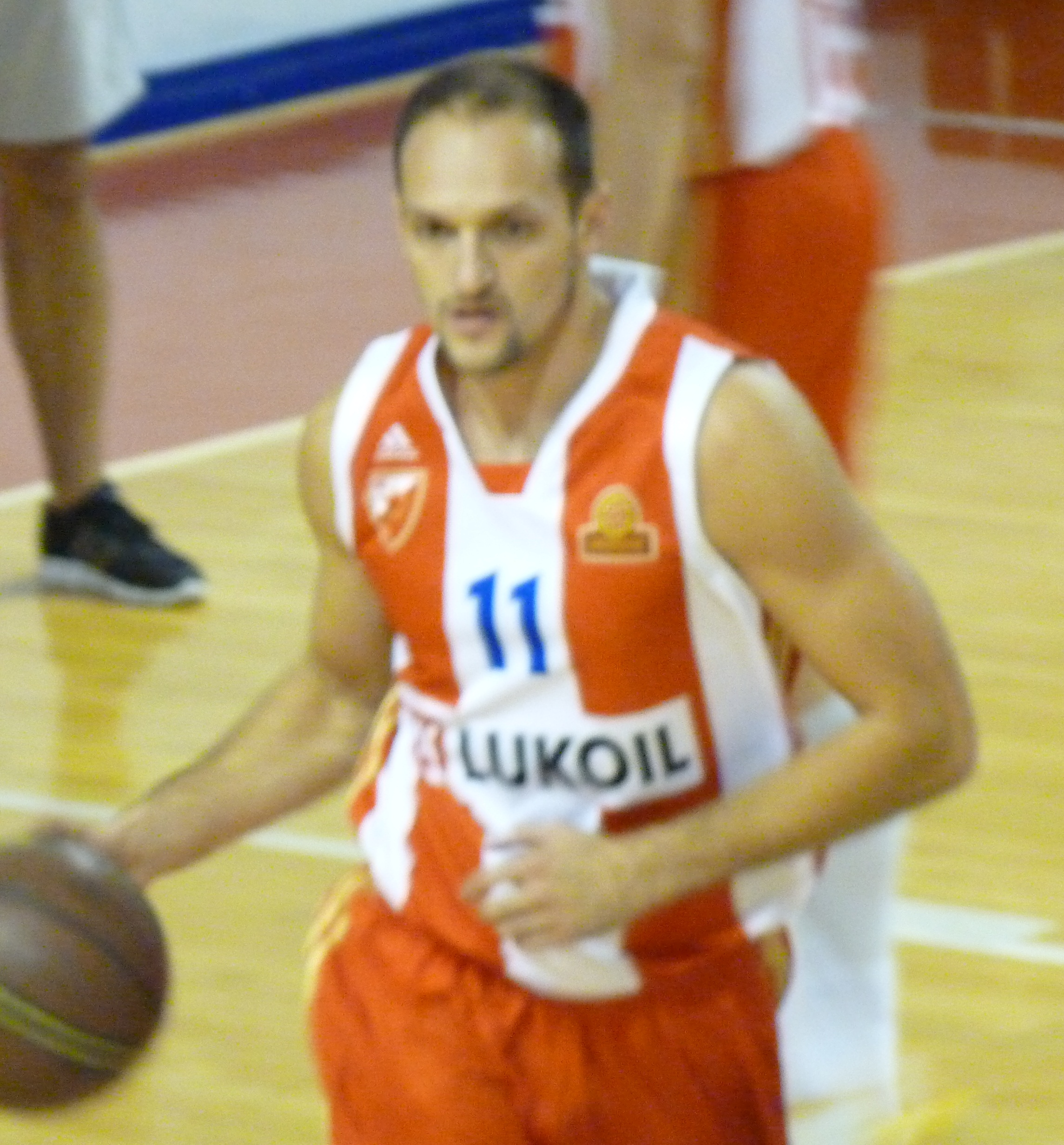
- Rakočević playing with Crvena zvezda in 2013.

Personal information
- Born: 29 March 1978 (age 48) Belgrade, SR Serbia, SFR Yugoslavia
- Listed height: 1.94 m (6 ft 4 in)
- Listed weight: 86 kg (190 lb)

Career information
- NBA draft: 2000: 2nd round, 51st overall pick
- Drafted by: Minnesota Timberwolves
- Playing career: 1994–2013
- Position: Shooting guard
- Number: 6, 7, 8, 11, 36

Career history
- 1994–2000: Crvena zvezda
- 2000–2002: Budućnost
- 2002–2003: Minnesota Timberwolves
- 2003–2004: Crvena zvezda
- 2004–2005: Valencia
- 2005–2006: Real Madrid
- 2006–2009: Baskonia
- 2009–2011: Anadolu Efes
- 2011–2012: Mens Sana Siena
- 2012–2013: Crvena zvezda

Career highlights
- All-EuroLeague First Team (2009); All-EuroLeague Second Team (2007); 3× Alphonso Ford EuroLeague Top Scorer Trophy (2007, 2009, 2011); Liga ACB champion (2008); Spanish Cup winner (2009); 3× Spanish Supercup winner (2006–2008); All-Liga ACB First Team (2009); Liga ACB Top Scorer (2009); Liga ACB 3 Point Shootout champion (2008); LBA champion (2012); Italian Cup winner (2012); 2× Turkish Super Cup winner (2009, 2010); ABA League Top Scorer (2004); 2× FR Yugoslav League champion (1998, 2001); FR Yugoslav Cup winner (2001); FR Yugoslav League Most Improved Player (1998); 2× Serbian Cup winner (2004, 2013); No. 8 retired by Crvena Zvezda; No. 8 retired by Baskonia; FIBA Europe Under-20 Championship MVP (1998)
- Stats at NBA.com
- Stats at Basketball Reference
Medals
Men's basketball
Representing (Federal Republic of Yugoslavia) FR Yugoslavia
World Cup
Gold medal – first place	2002 Indianapolis
EuroBasket
Gold medal – first place	2001 Turkey
Mediterranean Games
Bronze medal – third place	1997 Bari
'22 & under' World Championship
Bronze medal – third place	1997 Australia	Under-21 Team
'22 & under' European Championship
Gold medal – first place	1998 Italy	Under-20 Team
European Championship for Juniors
Bronze medal – third place	1996 France	Under-18 Team

Igor Rakočević (Serbian Cyrillic: Игор Ракочевић; born 29 March 1978) is a Serbian professional basketball executive and former player.

At a height of 1.94 m (6'4 1/2") tall, he played at both the point guard and shooting guard positions, but he spent the vast majority of his career playing as a shooting guard. During his playing career, Rakočević was a two-time All-EuroLeague Team member, and a three-time Alphonso Ford EuroLeague Top Scorer Trophy winner. He was also a member of the senior FR Yugoslavian national team, which was eventually renamed the Serbian and Montenegrin national team. With FR Yugoslavia, he won gold medals at both the 2001 FIBA EuroBasket and the 2002 FIBA World Championship.

== Professional career ==
=== Early years ===
Rakočević played with Crvena zvezda and Budućnost before going to the NBA. With Crvena zvezda, he won the YUBA League championship in the 1997–98 season, and finished second in the FIBA Korać Cup in the same season.

In 2000, after getting drafted in the NBA, he signed a three-year contract with KK Budućnost, with an NBA exit clause along with a set transfer fee should he decide to exercise the clause.

=== Minnesota Timberwolves ===
Rakočević was selected by the Minnesota Timberwolves, in the 2nd round (51st overall) of the 2000 NBA draft. He did not play in the NBA, until the 2002–03 NBA season, in which he totaled 244 minutes of playing time, in 42 games played, and averaged 1.9 points, 0.8 assists, and 0.4 rebounds per game. He was released after the season, and signed by the San Antonio Spurs, who also released him shortly after. The 2002 - 2003 season ended up being his only season in the NBA, with his final game being a 97–78 win over the Portland Trail Blazers on April 6, 2003. In his final game, Rakočević played for 1 minute and recorded 1 assist and no other stats.

=== Back to Europe ===
In October 2003, Rakočević returned to Europe, and signed with Crvena zvezda, where he was the top scorer of the Adriatic League. He was the captain and best player of Crvena zvezda in that 2003–04 season.

He continued his career in Spain, where he played with Pamesa Valencia, Real Madrid and Tau Cerámica. In the EuroLeague 2006–07 season, he won the Alphonso Ford EuroLeague Top Scorer Trophy. He was also selected to the All-EuroLeague Second Team of that year's competition. With TAU Cerámica, Rakočević won the Spanish Supercup title in 2006, 2007, and 2008, the Spanish King's Cup title in 2009, and the Spanish ACB League championship in 2008. He also won another Alphonso Ford Top Scorer Trophy with TAU, in 2009.

In June 2009, he signed a three-year contract with the Turkish Super League club Efes Pilsen. While playing with Efes, he also won the 2011 Alphonso Ford Top Scorer Trophy. In June 2011, he left Efes.

In October 2011, Rakočević signed with the Italian League club Montepaschi Siena, for the 2011–12 season.

On 9 August 2012, he signed a two-year contract with Crvena zvezda, which began his third stint with that team. In July 2013, Rakočević decided not to play for Crvena zvezda in the following season, and he made the statement that he would play abroad for one more season, or would retire, and become the sports director of the team.

== National team career ==
Rakočević made his debut with the senior FR Yugoslavian national team at the 2000 Summer Olympic Games. After that, he played at the 2001 EuroBasket, in Turkey (where he won a gold medal), and at the 2005 EuroBasket, in Serbia and Montenegro. He was a member of the FR Yugoslavia team that became the FIBA World Champions in Indianapolis, at the 2002 FIBA World Championship, and he was the captain of the Serbia and Montenegro national team in Japan, at the 2006 FIBA World Championship. He also played at the 2004 Athens Summer Olympic Games.

== Post-playing career ==
In February 2015, Rakočević was elected as the vice-president of the Basketball Federation of Serbia, and put in charge of men's basketball. In December 2020, he was not sought for re-election.

Rakočević was elected on 5-year term as a member of the Assembly of the KK Crvena zvezda on 27 December 2021.

== Personal life ==
Rakočević is the son of former Serbian basketball player Goran Rakočević, who played at the point guard position with Crvena zvezda.

Since retiring from professional basketball, Rakočević has taken up Brazilian Jiu-Jitsu and in December 2021 was promoted to black belt in the art after a little over nine years of training.

== Career statistics ==
Legend
GP	Games played	GS	Games started	MPG	Minutes per game
FG%	Field-goal percentage	3P%	3-point field-goal percentage	FT%	Free-throw percentage
RPG	Rebounds per game	APG	Assists per game	SPG	Steals per game
BPG	Blocks per game	PPG	Points per game	PIR	Performance index rating
**Bold**	Career high

=== NBA ===
==== Regular season ====
Year	Team	GP	GS	MPG	FG%	3P%	FT%	RPG	APG	SPG	BPG	PPG
2002–03	Minnesota	42	0	5.8	.379	.417	.806	.4	.8	.1	.0	1.9
Career		42	0	5.8	.379	.417	.806	.4	.8	.1	.0	1.9

=== EuroLeague ===
*	Led the league

Year	Team	GP	GS	MPG	FG%	3P%	FT%	RPG	APG	SPG	BPG	PPG	PIR
2000–01	Budućnost	11	10	29.8	.417	.222	.653	2.7	1.8	**1.4**	—	12.9	9.8
2001–02	Budućnost	14	12	29.6	.480	.345	.655	1.6	2.1	1.3	—	17.7	14.8
2005–06	Real Madrid	20	9	27.2	.443	.402	.893	**2.9**	**3.0**	.8	—	14.8	14.2
2006–07	Baskonia	**22**	20	27.2	**.492**	**.475**	.843	2.4	1.7	**1.4**	**.1**	16.2*	14.4
2007–08	Baskonia	**22**	**22**	27.8	.465	.396	.837	2.3	1.7	.7	.0	14.9	12.7
2008–09	Baskonia	21	21*	26.5	.460	.398	**.895**	2.3	2.0	.8	—	**18.0***	**16.8**
2009–10	Efes	16	5	20.1	.353	.286	.833	1.7	2.3	.4	—	10.0	9.1
2010–11	Efes	14	14	**29.9**	.457	.435	.877	2.3	1.7	.7	—	17.2*	15.0
2011–12	Mens Sana	19	5	19.6	.399	.256	.780	1.9	1.6	.3	**.1**	9.4	7.0
Career		159	119	26.4	.449	.384	.816	2.3	2.0	.8	.0	14.6	12.8

== Awards and accomplishments ==
=== Pro career ===
Crvena zvezda Belgrade

- FR Yugoslav League (1): 1998
- Serbian Radivoj Korać Cup (2): 2004, 2013

Budućnost Podgorica

- FR Yugoslav League (1): 2001
- FR Yugoslav Cup (1): 2001

Valencia Basket

- Valencian League (1): 2005

Real Madrid

- Community of Madrid Tournament (1): 2006

TAU Cerámica

- Spanish League (1): 2008
- Spanish Cup (1): 2009
- Spanish Supercup (3): 2006, 2007, 2008

Efes Istanbul

- Turkish Super Cup (2): 2009, 2010

Montepaschi Siena

- Italian League (1): 2012
- Italian Cup (1): 2012

=== Individual ===
- FR Yugoslavian League Most Improved Player: (1998)
- Adriatic League Final Four Top Scorer: (2004)
- Adriatic League Top Scorer: (2004)
- Spanish ACB League 3 Point Shootout Champion: (2007–08)
- 3× Alphonso Ford EuroLeague Top Scorer Trophy: 2007, 2009, 2011
- All-EuroLeague Second Team: (2007)
- All-EuroLeague First Team: (2009)
- Spanish League Top Scorer: (2009)
- All-Spanish League Team: (2009)

=== FR Yugoslavian junior national team ===
- 1996 FIBA Europe Under-18 Championship: Bronze
- 1997 Nike Hoop Summit
- 1997 FIBA Under-21 World Cup: Bronze
- 1998 FIBA Europe Under-20 Championship: Gold
- 1998 FIBA Europe Under-20 Championship: MVP

=== FR Yugoslavian senior national team ===
- 1997 Mediterranean Games: Bronze
- 2001 EuroBasket: Gold
- 2002 FIBA World Championship: Gold

== See also ==
- List of father-and-son combinations who have played for Crvena zvezda
- KK Crvena zvezda accomplishments and records
- List of Brazilian jiu-jitsu practitioners
- List of Serbian NBA players

== References and notes ==
Sporting positions
Preceded by Dejan Bodiroga	Vice president of the Basketball Federation of Serbia for men's basketball 2015–2020	Succeeded by Nenad Krstić
Preceded by Dejan Bodiroga	Serbia and Montenegro captain 2006	Succeeded by Milan Gurović
