= Alphonso Ford EuroLeague Top Scorer Trophy =

Annual basketball player award

The Alphonso Ford EuroLeague Top Scorer Trophy, also known as the EuroLeague best scorer, is an annual basketball award of Europe's premier level league, the Turkish Airlines EuroLeague. It is given to the top scorer throughout the EuroLeague season, up until the Turkish Airlines EuroLeague Final Four stage of the season. The award, under its current name, began in the 2004–05 season, and is named after the late Alphonso Ford, who was one of the greatest scorers in EuroLeague history.

Since the Alphonso Ford award has been given out (2004–05 season onward), a player could average the most points during the EuroLeague full season competition, and not win the award, since it is only counted for games up to the EuroLeague Final Four. Prior to the 2004–05 season, the EuroLeague's top scorer was recorded statistically, but it was called the EuroLeague top scorer award.

== EuroLeague top scorers (1992–2004) ==
- Player nationalities by national team.

Season	Position	Top scorer	Team	PPG
FIBA EuroLeague top scorer (1991–92 to 1999–00)
1991–92	SG	(Greece) Nikos Galis	(Greece) Aris	32.3
1992–93	SG	(Croatia) Zdravko Radulović	(Croatia) Cibona	23.9
1993–94	SG	(Greece) Nikos Galis (2)	(Greece) Panathinaikos	23.8
1994–95	SG	(Federal Republic of Yugoslavia) Predrag Danilović	(Italy) Buckler Bologna	22.1
1995–96	PF	(United States) Joe Arlauckas	(Spain) Real Madrid	26.4
1996–97	SG	(Italy) Carlton Myers	(Italy) Teamsystem Bologna	22.9
1997–98	SF	(Federal Republic of Yugoslavia) Peja Stojaković	(Greece) PAOK	20.9
1998–99	SG	(Turkey) İbrahim Kutluay	(Turkey) Fenerbahçe	21.4
1999–00	SF	(Slovenia) Miljan Goljović	(Slovenia) Zlatorog Laško	20.2
FIBA SuproLeague Top Scorer (2000–01)
2000–01	SG	(Federal Republic of Yugoslavia) Miroslav Berić	(Federal Republic of Yugoslavia) Partizan	23.3
EuroLeague top scorer (2000–01 to 2003–04)
2000–01	SG	(United States) Alphonso Ford	(Greece) Peristeri	26.0
2001–02	SG	(United States) Alphonso Ford (2)	(Greece) Olympiacos	24.8
2002–03	PG/SG	(Serbia and Montenegro) Miloš Vujanić	(Serbia and Montenegro) Partizan	25.8
2003–04	PG/SG	(United States) Lynn Greer	(Poland) Śląsk Wrocław	25.1

=== Multiple EuroLeague top scorers (1992–2004) ===
Number	Player
2	(Greece) Nikos Galis
2	(United States) Alphonso Ford
1	10 Players

== Alphonso Ford Trophy winners and top scorers (2005–present) ==
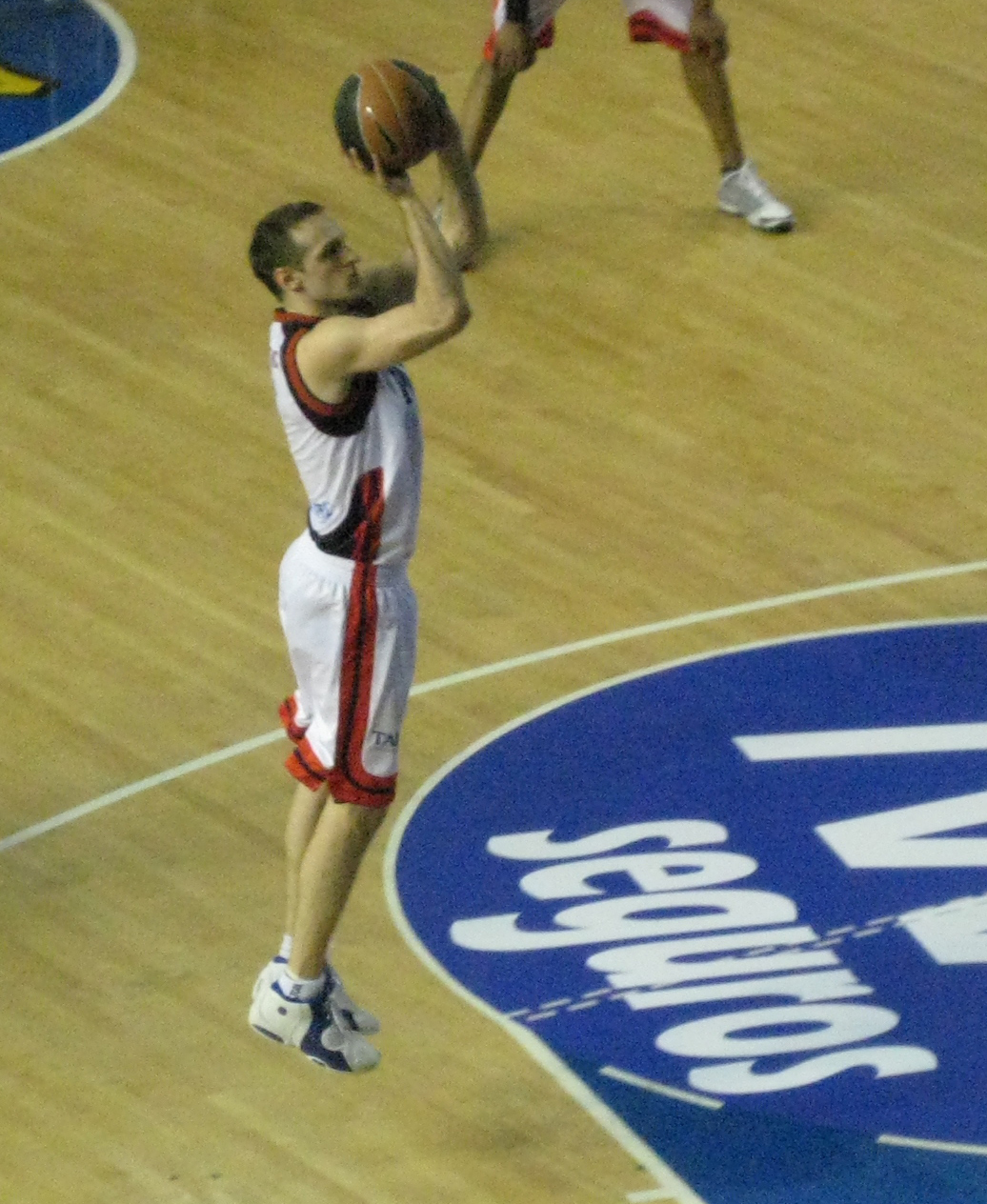
Igor Rakočević won the Alphonso Ford Trophy on 3 occasions (2007, 2009, 2011).

Sasha Vezenkov won Alphonso Ford Trophy award in 2023 and 2026

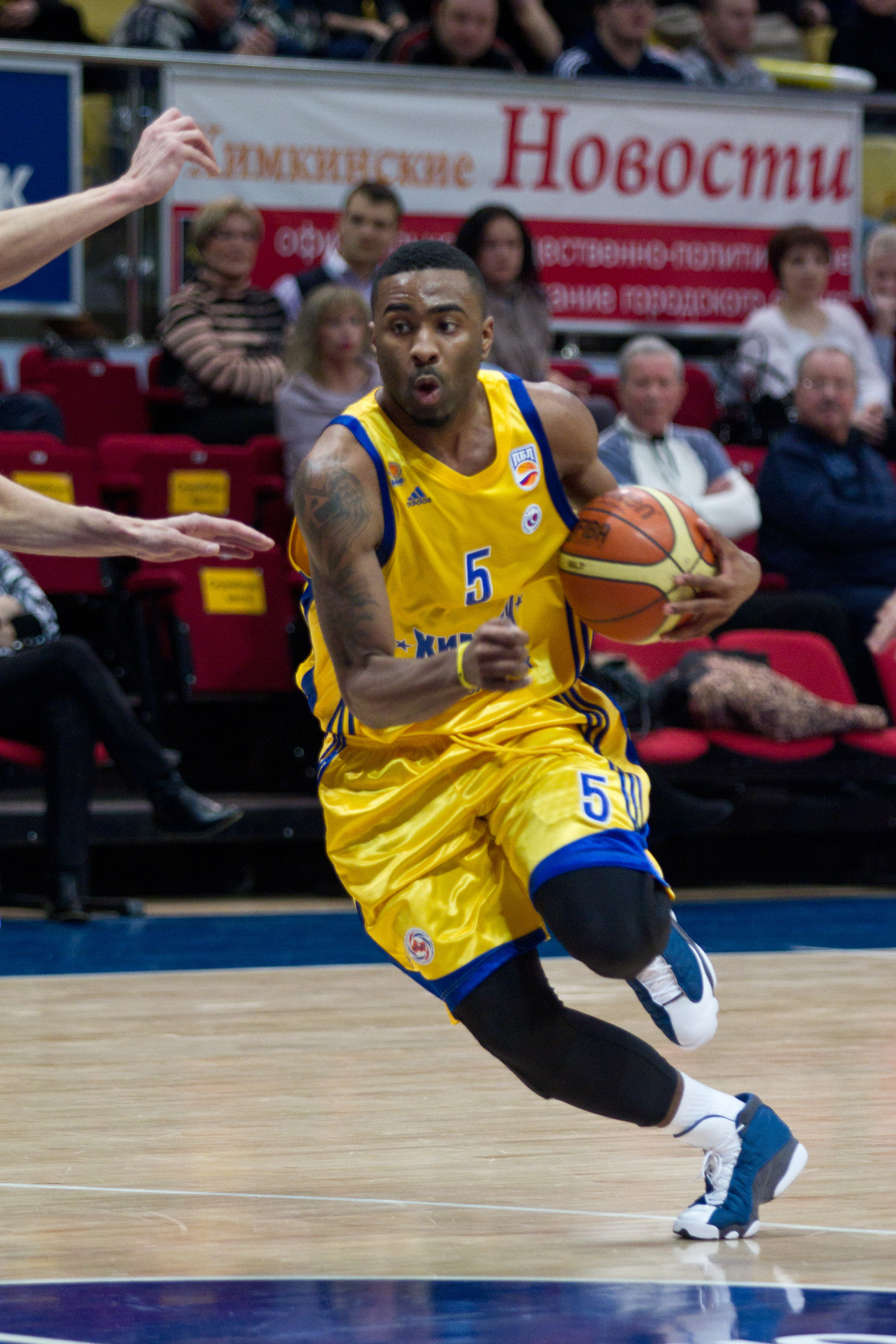
Keith Langford won the Alphonso Ford Trophy on 2 occasions (2014, 2017).

Beginning with the 2004–05 season, the EuroLeague awards the Alphonso Ford Trophy, in memorial of the late Alphonso Ford, to the player with the highest scoring average before the EuroLeague Final Four takes place. Because of this, it is still possible for a player to lead the league in scoring, but not win the Alphonso Ford Trophy. This happened during the 2006–07 season, when Igor Rakočević won the Alphonso Ford Trophy, but Juan Carlos Navarro was the league's top scorer.

Navarro had the highest full season scoring average in the EuroLeague, at 16.8 points per game, but did not win the Alphonso Ford Trophy, because he did not have the highest scoring average prior to the start of the EuroLeague Final Four. So instead, Rakočević was given the trophy, despite actually finishing second in the full season scoring statistical category, with an average of 16.2 points per game.

- Player nationalities by national team.

Season	Position	Alphonso Ford Trophy (Top Scorer)	Team	PPG	Ref.
Alphonso Ford EuroLeague Top Scorer Trophy (2004–05 to present)
2004–05	SG	(United States) Charles Smith	(Italy) Scavolini Pesaro	20.7	
2005–06	SG	(United States) Drew Nicholas	(Italy) Benetton Treviso	18.5	
2006–07	SG	(Serbia) Igor Rakočević^{1}	(Spain) Tau Cerámica	16.2	
2007–08	PF	(United States) Marc Salyers	(France) Roanne	21.8	
2008–09	SG	(Serbia) Igor Rakočević (2)	(Spain) Tau Cerámica	18.0	
2009–10	PF	(Lithuania) Linas Kleiza	(Greece) Olympiacos	17.1	
2010–11	SG	(Serbia) Igor Rakočević (3)	(Turkey) Efes Pilsen	17.2	
2011–12	G	(North Macedonia) Bo McCalebb	(Italy) Montepaschi Siena	16.9	
2012–13	G	(United States) Bobby Brown	(Italy) Montepaschi Siena	18.8	
2013–14	SG	(United States) Keith Langford	(Italy) EA7 Milano	17.6	
2014–15	G	(Montenegro) Taylor Rochestie	(Russia) Nizhny Novgorod	18.9	
2015–16	SG	(France) Nando de Colo	(Russia) CSKA Moscow	19.4	
2016–17	SG	(United States) Keith Langford (2)	(Russia) UNICS	21.8	
2017–18	SG	(Russia) Alexey Shved	(Russia) Khimki	21.8	
2018–19	G	(United States) Mike James	(Italy) A|X Armani Exchange Milan	19.8	
2019–20 (Not awarded)	SG	(United States) Shane Larkin	(Turkey) Anadolu Efes	22.2	
2020–21	SG	(Russia) Alexey Shved (2)	(Russia) Khimki	19.8	
2021–22	G	(Serbia) Vasilije Micić	(Turkey) Anadolu Efes	18.2	
2022–23	PF	(Bulgaria) Sasha Vezenkov	(Greece) Olympiacos	17.6	
2023–24	SG	(United States) Markus Howard	(Spain) Baskonia	19.5	
2024–25	SG	(United States) Kendrick Nunn	(Greece) Panathinaikos	20.0	
2025–26	PF	(Bulgaria) Sasha Vezenkov (2)	(Greece) Olympiacos	19.0	

Notes:

^1 (Spain) Juan Carlos Navarro was the Top scorer of the 2006–07 season, while (Serbia) Igor Rakočević was the Alphonso Ford Trophy winner.
^2 There was no awarding in the 2019–20, because the season was cancelled due to the coronavirus pandemic in Europe.

=== Honors since the 2004–05 season ===
==== Players ====
Number	Player
3	(Serbia) Igor Rakočević
2
2	(Bulgaria) Sasha Vezenkov
2	(United States) Keith Langford
2	(Russia) Alexey Shved
1	(United States) Bobby Brown
1	(France) Nando de Colo
1	(Lithuania) Linas Kleiza
1	(North Macedonia) Bo McCalebb
1	(United States) Drew Nicholas
1	(Montenegro) Taylor Rochestie
1	(United States) Marc Salyers
1	(United States) Charles Smith
1	(United States) Mike James
1	(Serbia) Vasilije Micić
1	(United States) Markus Howard
1	(United States) Kendrick Nunn

==== Player nationality ====
Number	Country
9	United States
4	Serbia
2	Russia
2	Bulgaria
1	France
1	Lithuania
1	North Macedonia
1	Montenegro

==== Teams ====
Number	Team
3	(Spain) Baskonia
3	(Greece) Olympiacos
2	(Italy) Mens Sana
2	(Italy) Olimpia Milano
2	(Russia) Khimki
2	(Turkey) Anadolu Efes
1	(Italy) Treviso
1	(France) Chorale Roanne
1	(Russia) CSKA Moscow
1	(Russia) Nizhny Novgorod
1	(Russia) UNICS
1	(Italy) Victoria Libertas Pesaro
1	(Greece) Panathinaikos
