= Marc Salyers =

American basketball player (born 1979)

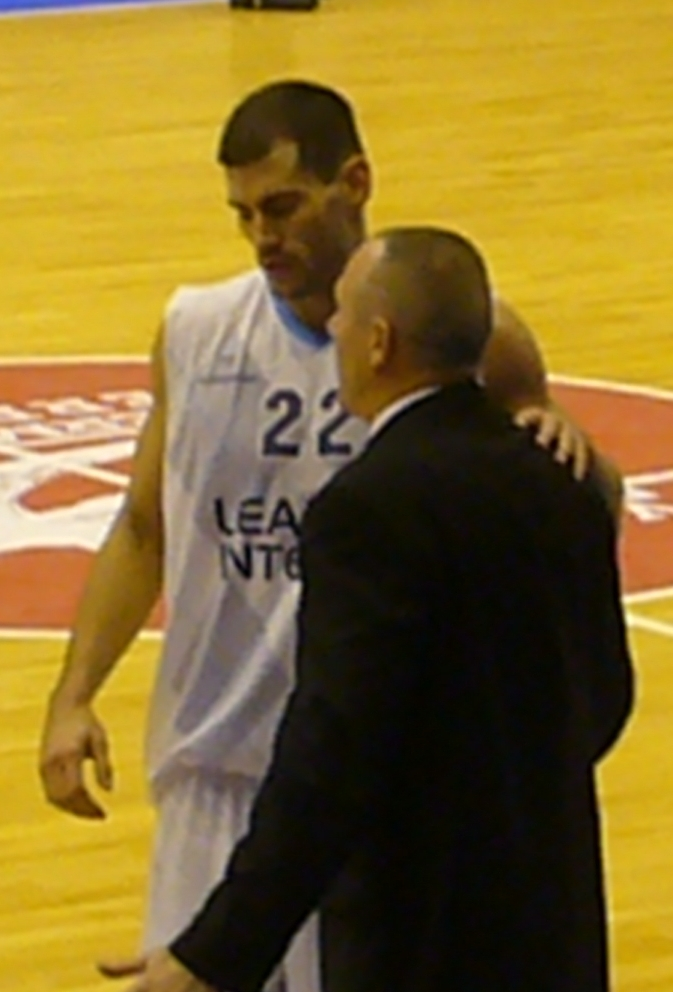
- Salyers with Chorale Roanne in 2007

Personal information
- Born: February 28, 1979 (age 47) Chicago, Illinois, U.S.
- Listed height: 6 ft 8.75 in (2.05 m)
- Listed weight: 230 lb (104 kg)

Career information
- High school: Apollo (Owensboro, Kentucky)
- College: Samford (1997–2001)
- NBA draft: 2001: undrafted
- Playing career: 2001–2014
- Position: Small forward / power forward

Career history
- 2001–2003: Cimberlo Novara
- 2003–2004: Oyak Renault
- 2004: Élan Béarnais Pau-Orthez
- 2004–2005: Fenerbahçe
- 2005: BCM Gravelines
- 2005: BG Leitershofen
- 2005: Busan Magicwings
- 2006: RB Montecatini Terme
- 2006–2008: Chorale Roanne
- 2008: Azovmash Mariupol
- 2009–2010: Le Mans Sarthe
- 2010–2011: Angelico Biella
- 2011: Sagesse Beirut
- 2011: Sokhumi
- 2011–2012: Trabzonspor
- 2012–2013: Al Mouttahed Tripoli
- 2013: STB Le Havre
- 2014: BC Orchies

Career highlights
- Alphonso Ford EuroLeague Top Scorer Trophy (2008); Turkish League Top Scorer (2004); 2× French Pro A champion (2004, 2007); French League Foreign Player's MVP (2008); French Pro A Finals MVP (2007); Semaine des As winner (2007); Semaine des As MVP (2007); 2× French All-Star (2007, 2008); Turkish League All-Star (2005); FIBA EuroChallenge All-Star (2005)

Marc Douglas Salyers (born February 28, 1979) is an American retired professional basketball player. He played at the small forward and power forward positions.

== College career ==
Salyers played college basketball at Samford University with the Samford Bulldogs from 1997 to 2001. In his senior season, he averaged 17.2 points per game.

== Professional career ==
Salyers played his first two professional years with Cimberlo Novara of the Italian Legadue.

For the 2003–04 season, he moved to Turkey and signed with Oyak Renault. He was the top scorer of the 2003–04 TBL season, with average of 25.3 points per game. In April 2004, he moved for the remainder of the season to Élan Béarnais Pau-Orthez, and helped them to win the 2003–04 LNB Pro A season.

For the 2004–05 season he returned to Turkey and signed with Fenerbahçe. He averaged 16.6 points in 19 FIBA Europe League games and helped Fenerbahce to make it to that competition's semifinals.

During the 2005–06 season, Salyers played for four teams – BCM Gravelines of France, BG Leitershofen of Germany, the Busan Magicwings of South Korea and RB Montecatini Terme of Italy.

In the summer of 2006, he returned to France and signed with Chorale Roanne. In his first season with Roanne, he helped them to win both the French League and the Semaine des As titles, earning MVP honours in both occasions. In his second season with Roanne, he played great in EuroLeague. On November 14, 2007, he scored 40 points against his former team Fenerbahçe during a EuroLeague match. For his performances during the season, he was awarded with the Alphonso Ford EuroLeague Top Scorer Trophy, an annual award given to the EuroLeague's top scorer of the season.

On July 6, 2008, Salyers signed with Ukrainian club Azovmash Mariupol. The financial troubles of Azovmash have forced him to leave during the season. As a player of Azovmash he averaged 11.8 points and 4.5 rebounds in 12 games of the Ukrainian Superleague.

On July 18, 2009, Salyers signed with Le Mans Sarthe for the 2009–10 season.

On July 28, 2010, he signed with Italian club Angelico Biella for the 2010–11 Serie A season. In 30 games, he averaged 11.1 points and 4.6 rebounds per game.

The 2011–12 season, Salyers started playing with Sokhumi in the FIBA EuroChallenge qualifying round. In November 2011, he signed with Trabzonspor. He left Trabzon after appearing in seven games.

In August 2012, he signed with Al Mouttahed Tripoli of the Lebanese Basketball League for the 2012–13 season.

On October 23, 2013, Salyers signed with STB Le Havre of the French Pro A. On November 29, 2013, he parted ways with Le Havre after appearing in only three games. On December 30, 2013, he signed with BC Orchies of the LNB Pro B for the rest of the season.

== Career statistics ==
Legend
GP	Games played	GS	Games started	MPG	Minutes per game
FG%	Field-goal percentage	3P%	3-point field-goal percentage	FT%	Free-throw percentage
RPG	Rebounds per game	APG	Assists per game	SPG	Steals per game
BPG	Blocks per game	PPG	Points per game	PIR	Performance index rating
**Bold**	Career high

=== EuroLeague ===
*	Led the league

Year	Team	GP	GS	MPG	FG%	3P%	FT%	RPG	APG	SPG	BPG	PPG	PIR
2007–08	Roanne	14	14	33.9*	.474	.349	.691	6.6	1.6	1.6	.4	21.8*	22.5*
Career		14	14	33.9	.474	.349	.691	6.6	1.6	1.6	.4	21.8	22.5
