= 2007–08 Euroleague =

EuroLeague season

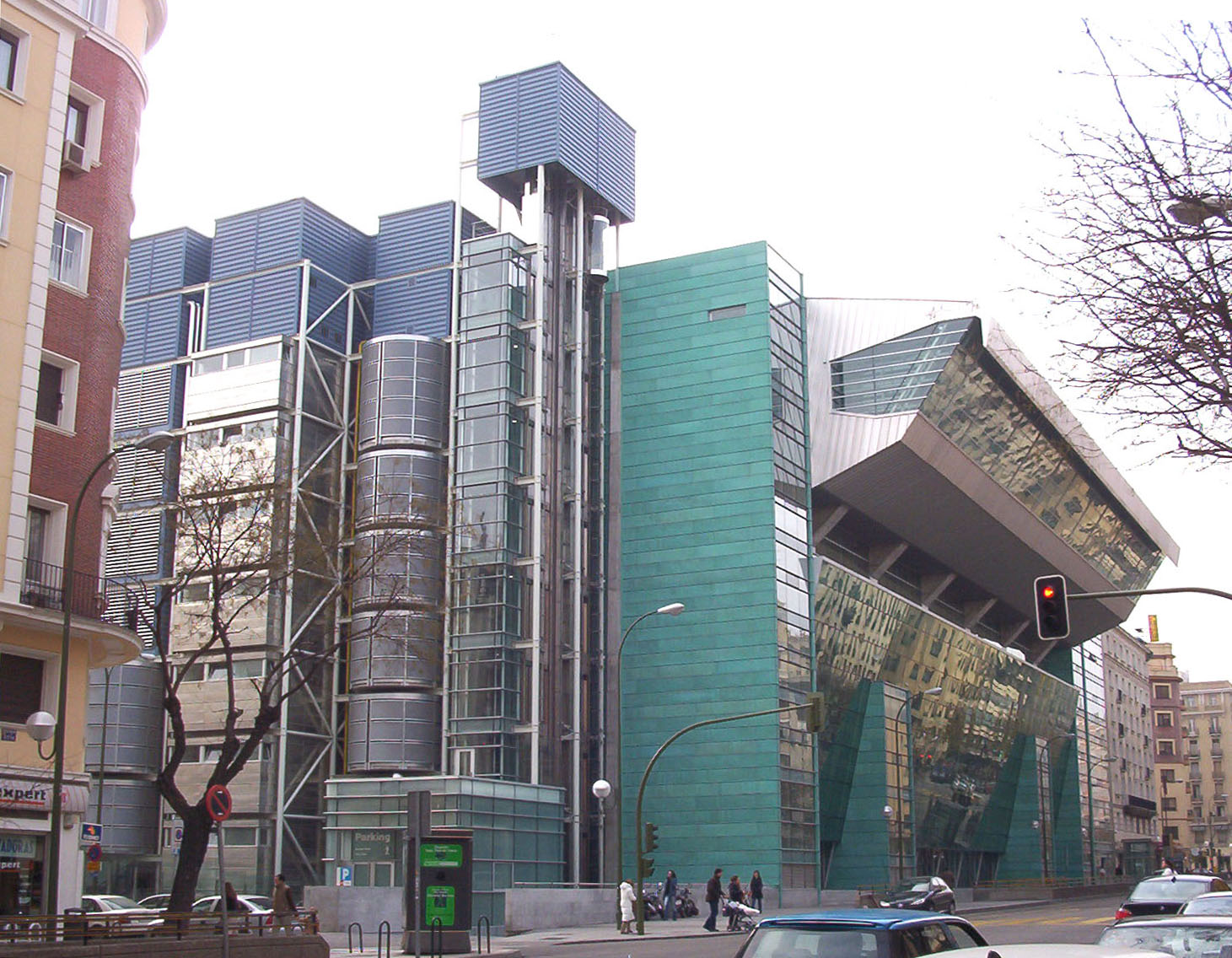
- The Palacio de Deportes hosted the Final Four
- Season: 2007–08
- Dates: 22 October 2007 – 4 May 2008
- Teams: 24

Regular season
- Season MVP: (Lithuania) Ramūnas Šiškauskas

Finals
- Champions: (Russia) CSKA Moscow (6th title)
- Runners-up: (Israel) Maccabi Elite
- Third place: (Italy) Montepaschi Siena
- Fourth place: (Spain) Tau Cerámica
- Final Four MVP: (United States) Trajan Langdon

Statistical leaders
Points	(United States) Marc Salyers	21.8
Rebounds	(United States) Travis Watson	9.7
Assists	(United States) DeJuan Collins	5.4
Index Rating	(United States) Marc Salyers	22.5

The 2007–08 Euroleague was the 8th season of the professional basketball competition for elite clubs throughout Europe, organised by Euroleague Basketball Company, and it was the 51st season of the premier competition for European men's clubs overall. The 2007–08 season featured 24 competing teams. The Euroleague Regular Season draw was held on 30 June 2007, in Jesolo, Italy, during the inaugural Euroleague summer league. The official inauguration was held on October 22, at Hala Olivia in Gdańsk, Poland, before the season's opening game between Prokom Trefl Sopot and CSKA Moscow. The 2008 Final Four was held on May 2–4, 2008, at the Palacio de Deportes de la Comunidad de Madrid in Madrid, Spain. Russian power CSKA Moscow became the champion for the sixth time, placing them second in all-time European championships to Real Madrid.

== Teams of the 2007–08 Euroleague ==
Key to colors
Champion
Runner-up
Third place
Fourth place
Eliminated in Quarterfinals
Eliminated in Last 16
Eliminated in the regular season

LC: 3-year licence

Country	Teams	Teams (place in national championship)			
Spain	4	Real Madrid (1)	FC Barcelona (2)	Tau Cerámica (3)	Unicaja Málaga (8)^{LC}
Italy	4	Montepaschi Siena (1)	VidiVici Bologna (2)	Lottomatica Roma (3)	Armani Jeans Milano (4)
Greece	3	Panathinaikos (1)	Olympiacos (2)	Aris TT Bank (3)	
Turkey	2	Fenerbahçe Ülker (1)	Efes Pilsen (2)		
Lithuania	2	Žalgiris (1)	Lietuvos Rytas (2)		
France	2	Roanne (1)	Le Mans (6)^{LC}		
Germany	1	Brose Bamberg (1)			
Croatia	1	Cibona (1)			
Russia	1	CSKA Moscow (1)			
Israel	1	Maccabi Elite (1)			
Slovenia	1	Union Olimpija (2)^{LC}			
Serbia	1	Partizan (1)			
Poland	1	Prokom Trefl Sopot (1)			

=== Teams details ===
Team	Location	Arena (seating capacity)	Classification
Aris	(Greece) Thessaloniki	Alexandrio Melathron (5,500)	A1 Ethniki third placed team
Brose Bamberg	(Germany) Bamberg	Jako Arena (6,900)	Basketball Bundesliga two-year classification
Cibona	(Croatia) Zagreb	Dražen Petrović Basketball Hall (5,400)	A1 Liga three-year period classified
CSKA Moscow	(Russia) Moscow	CSKA Universal Sports Hall (5,500), Khodynka Arena (14,500) — Game 13 only	Russian Super League three-year period classified
Efes Pilsen	(Turkey) Istanbul	Abdi İpekçi Arena (12,500)	Turkish League three-year period classified
FC Barcelona	(Spain) Barcelona	Palau Blaugrana (8,250)	ACB
Fenerbahçe Ülker	(Turkey) Istanbul	Abdi İpekçi Arena (12,500)	Turkish League three-year period classified
Le Mans	(France) Le Mans	Antarès (6,003)	La Ligue three-year period classified
Lietuvos Rytas	(Lithuania) Vilnius	Siemens Arena (11,000)	ULEB Cup vice Champion
Lottomatica Roma	(Italy) Rome	PalaLottomatica (11,200)	Serie A
Maccabi Elite	(Israel) Tel Aviv	Nokia Arena (Yad Eliyahu) (11,700)	Israeli League three-year period classified
Montepaschi Siena	(Italy) Siena	Palasport Mens Sana (7,025)	Serie A regular season leader
Armani Jeans Milano	(Italy) Milan	Datch Forum di Assago (13,000)	Serie A
Union Olimpija	(Slovenia) Ljubljana	Dvorana Tivoli (6,000)	Liga UPC Telemach three-year period classified
Olympiacos	(Greece) Piraeus	Peace and Friendship Stadium (14,905)	A1 Ethniki three-year period classified
Panathinaikos	(Greece) Athens	Olympic Indoor Hall (19,250)	A1 Ethniki three-year period classified
Partizan	(Serbia) Belgrade	Pionir Hall (8,150)	Naša Sinalko Liga Champion
Prokom Trefl Sopot	(Poland) Sopot	Hala Olivia (5,500), Gdańsk (Game 1-8); Hala Stulecia Sopotu (2,000), Sopot (Game 9 onward)	Dominet Bank Ekstraliga Champion
Real Madrid	(Spain) Madrid	Palacio Vistalegre (15,000)	ULEB Cup Champion/ACB
Roanne	(France) Roanne	Clermont-Ferrand Sports Hall (5,000)	La Ligue champion
Tau Cerámica	(Spain) Vitoria-Gasteiz	Fernando Buesa Arena (15,504)	ACB three-year period classified
Unicaja Málaga	(Spain) Málaga	Jose Maria Martin Carpena Arena (13,000)	ACB three-year period classified
VidiVici Bologna	(Italy) Bologna	PalaMalaguti (11,000)	Serie A
Žalgiris	(Lithuania) Kaunas	Kaunas Sports Hall (5,000)	LKL three-year period classified

== Regular season ==
The regular season began on October 22, 2007.

The first phase was a regular season, in which the competing teams were drawn into three groups, each containing eight teams. Each team played every other team in its group at home and away, resulting in 14 games for each team in the first stage. The top 5 teams in each group and the best sixth-placed team advanced to the next round. The complete list of tiebreakers was provided in the lead-in to the Regular Season results.

If one or more clubs were level on won-lost record, tiebreakers are applied in the following order:

1. Head-to-head record in matches between the tied clubs
2. Overall point difference in games between the tied clubs
3. Overall point difference in all group matches (first tiebreaker if tied clubs were not in the same group)
4. Points scored in all group matches
5. Sum of quotients of points scored and points allowed in each group match

Key to colors
Top five places in each group, plus highest-ranked sixth-place team, advanced to Top 16

=== Group A ===
	Team	Pld	W	L	PF	PA	Diff
1.	(Russia) CSKA Moscow	14	12	2	1123	942	+181
2.	(Italy) Montepaschi Siena	14	10	4	1098	974	+124
3.	(Spain) Tau Cerámica	14	9	5	1170	1051	+119
4.	(Lithuania) Žalgiris	14	8	6	1110	1126	−16
5.	(Greece) Olympiacos	14	7	7	1185	1099	+86
6.	(Slovenia) Union Olimpija	14	4	10	1030	1147	−117
7.	(Poland) Prokom Trefl Sopot	14	4	10	973	1143	−170
8.	(Italy) VidiVici Bologna	14	2	12	1008	1215	−207

=== Group B ===
	Team	Pld	W	L	PF	PA	Diff
1.	(Lithuania) Lietuvos Rytas	14	11	3	1127	999	+128
2.	(Israel) Maccabi Elite	14	11	3	1162	1108	+54
3.	(Spain) Unicaja Málaga	14	10	4	1124	1007	+117
4.	(Turkey) Efes Pilsen	14	8	6	1106	1080	+26
5.	(Greece) Aris TT Bank	14	7	7	1054	1072	−18
6.	(Croatia) Cibona VIP	14	4	10	1080	1188	−108
7.	(Italy) Armani Jeans Milano	14	3	11	1015	1107	−92
8.	(France) Le Mans	14	2	12	1035	1142	−107

=== Group C ===
	Team	Pld	W	L	PF	PA	Diff
1.	(Greece) Panathinaikos	14	12	2	1156	1037	+119
2.	(Spain) Real Madrid	14	11	3	1137	1015	+122
3.	(Spain) AXA FC Barcelona	14	9	5	1082	991	+91
4.	(Turkey) Fenerbahçe Ülker	14	6	8	1087	1103	−19
5.	(Serbia) Partizan Igokea	14	6	8	1100	1103	−3
6.	(Italy) Lottomatica Roma	14	6	8	1071	1093	−22
7.	(France) Chorale Roanne	14	4	10	1104	1224	−120
8.	(Germany) Brose Baskets	14	2	12	879	1040	−161

== Top 16 ==
The surviving teams were divided into four groups of four teams each, and again a round robin system was adopted, resulting in 6 games each, with the two top teams advancing to the quarterfinals. Tiebreakers were identical to those used in the Regular Season.

The draw to set up the Top 16 groups was held on Monday, February 4, 2008 (the week after the end of the Regular Season), in Madrid.

The teams were placed into four pools, as follows:

Level 1: The three group winners, plus the top-ranked second-place team

- CSKA Moscow, Panathinaikos, Lietuvos Rytas, Real Madrid

Level 2: The remaining second-place teams, plus the top two third-place teams

- Maccabi Elite, Montepaschi Siena, Unicaja Málaga, Tau Cerámica

Level 3: The remaining third-place team, plus the three fourth-place teams

- FC Barcelona, Efes Pilsen, Žalgiris, Fenerbahçe Ülker

Level 4: The fifth-place teams, plus the top ranked sixth-place team

- Olympiacos, Aris, Partizan, Lottomatica Roma

Each Top 16 group included one team from each pool. The draw was conducted under the following restrictions:

1. No more than two teams from the same Regular Season group could be placed in the same Top 16 group.
2. No more than two teams from the same country could be placed in the same Top 16 group.
3. If there is a conflict between these two restrictions, (1) would receive priority.

Another draw was held to determine the order of fixtures. In the cases of two teams from the same city in the Top 16 (Panathinaikos and Olympiacos, Efes Pilsen and Fenerbahçe), they were scheduled so that only one of the two teams would be at home in a given week.

Key to colors
Top two places in each group advanced to quarterfinals

=== Group D ===
	Team	Pld	W	L	PF	PA	Diff
1.	(Italy) Montepaschi Siena	6	4	2	465	427	+38
2.	(Serbia) Partizan	6	4	2	440	430	+10
3.	(Greece) Panathinaikos	6	3	3	430	446	−16
4.	(Turkey) Efes Pilsen	6	1	5	426	458	−32

=== Group E ===
	Team	Pld	W	L	PF	PA	Diff
1.	(Spain) Tau Cerámica	6	5	1	510	467	+43
2.	(Turkey) Fenerbahçe Ülker	6	3	3	493	488	+5
3.	(Lithuania) Lietuvos Rytas	6	2	4	506	507	−1
4.	(Greece) Aris TT Bank	6	2	4	448	495	−47

=== Group F ===
	Team	Pld	W	L	PF	PA	Diff
1.	(Israel) Maccabi Elite	6	4	2	516	496	+20
2.	(Greece) Olympiacos	6	4	2	443	436	+7
3.	(Spain) Real Madrid	6	3	3	489	493	−4
4.	(Lithuania) Žalgiris	6	1	5	457	480	−23

=== Group G ===
	Team	Pld	W	L	PF	PA	Diff
1.	(Russia) CSKA Moscow	6	4	2	448	386	+62
2.	(Spain) AXA FC Barcelona	6	3	3	393	383	+10
3.	(Spain) Unicaja	6	3	3	412	418	−6
4.	(Italy) Lottomatica Roma	6	2	4	383	449	−66

== Quarterfinals ==
Each quarterfinal was a best-of-three (if third serie necessary) series between a first-place team in the Top 16 and a second-place team from a different group, with the first-place team receiving home advantage. All opening games were played on April 1, 2008, and all second games were played on April 3. The deciding third games were played on April 9 and April 10.

Team 1	Agg.	Team 2	1st leg	2nd leg	3rd leg
Montepaschi Siena (Italy)	2–0	(Turkey) Fenerbahçe Ülker	73–66	86–65	
Tau Cerámica (Spain)	2–1	(Serbia) Partizan	74–66	55–76	85-68
Maccabi Elite (Israel)	2–1	(Spain) AXA FC Barcelona	81–75	74–83	88-75
CSKA Moscow (Russia)	2–1	(Greece) Olympiacos	74–76	83–73	81-56

== Final four ==
The Final Four is the last phase of each Euroleague season, and is held over a weekend. The semifinal games are played on Friday evening. Sunday starts with the third-place game, followed by the championship final.

=== Semifinals ===
May 2, Palacio de Deportes de la Comunidad de Madrid, Madrid

Team 1	Score	Team 2
Montepaschi Siena (Italy)	85–92	(Israel) Maccabi Elite
Tau Cerámica (Spain)	79–83	(Russia) CSKA Moscow

=== Third-place game ===
May 4, Palacio de Deportes de la Comunidad de Madrid, Madrid

Team 1	Score	Team 2
Montepaschi Siena (Italy)	97–93	(Spain) Tau Cerámica

=== Final ===
May 4, Palacio de Deportes de la Comunidad de Madrid, Madrid

Team 1	Score	Team 2
Maccabi Elite (Israel)	77–91	(Russia) CSKA Moscow

2007–08 Euroleague
Champions

CSKA Moscow
6th Title

=== Final standings ===
	Team
	(Russia) CSKA Moscow
2nd place, silver medalist(s)	(Israel) Maccabi Elite
3rd place, bronze medalist(s)	(Italy) Montepaschi Siena
	(Spain) Tau Cerámica

=== Final Four 2008 MVP ===
(United States) Trajan Langdon (CSKA Moscow)

== Individual statistics ==
=== Rating ===
Rank	Name	Team	Games	Rating	PIR
1.	(United States) Marc Salyers	(France) Roanne	14	315	22.50
2.	(North Macedonia) Jeremiah Massey	(Greece) Aris	20	420	21.00
3.	(Montenegro) Nikola Peković	(Serbia) Partizan	23	451	19.61

=== Points ===
Rank	Name	Team	Games	Rating	PPG
1.	(United States) Marc Salyers	(France) Roanne	14	305	21.79
2.	(United States) Will Solomon	(Turkey) Fenerbahçe Ülker	21	376	17.90
3.	(North Macedonia) Jeremiah Massey	(Greece) Aris	20	340	17.00

=== Rebounds ===
Rank	Name	Team	Games	Rating	RPG
1.	(United States) Travis Watson	(Italy) Armani Jeans Milano	14	136	9.71
2.	(North Macedonia) Jeremiah Massey	(Greece) Aris	20	169	8.45
3.	(United States) Terence Morris	(Israel) Maccabi Elite	25	208	8.32

=== Assists ===
Rank	Name	Team	Games	Rating	APG
1.	(United States) DeJuan Collins	(Lithuania) Žalgiris	20	107	5.35
2.	(United States) Terrell McIntyre	(Italy) Montepaschi Siena	24	118	4.92
3.	(Greece) Theo Papaloukas	(Russia) CSKA Moscow	23	105	4.57

=== Other Stats ===
Category	Name	Team	Games	Stat
Steals per game	(United States) / (Italy) Shaun Stonerook	(Italy) Montepaschi Siena	24	2.58
Blocks per game	(Turkey) Ömer Aşık	(Turkey) Fenerbahçe Ülker	15	2.07
Turnovers per game	(Belize) Milt Palacio	(Serbia) Partizan	23	3.39
Fouls drawn per game	(United States) Marc Salyers	(France) Roanne	14	6.14
Minutes per game	(United States) Marc Salyers	(France) Roanne	14	33:54
2FG%	(Lithuania) Marijonas Petravičius	(Lithuania) Lietuvos Rytas	17	0.721
3FG%	(Lithuania) Kšyštof Lavrinovič	(Italy) Montepaschi Siena	22	0.578
FT%	(Lithuania) Šarūnas Jasikevičius	(Greece) Panathinaikos	20	0.938

=== Game highs ===
Category	Name	Team	Stat
Rating	(Belgium) Tomas Van Den Spiegel	(Poland) Prokom Trefl Sopot	50
Points	(United States) Marc Salyers	(France) Roanne	40
Rebounds	(Spain) Jordi Trias	(Spain) FC Barcelona	20
Assists	(France) Marc-Antoine Pellin	(France) Roanne	13
Steals	3 occasions		8
Blocks	(United States) Terence Morris	(Israel) Maccabi Elite	6
Turnovers	(United States) Will Solomon	(Turkey) Fenerbahçe Ülker	8
Turnovers	(United States) Marcus Haislip	(Spain) Unicaja Málaga	8
Fouls Drawn	(Montenegro) Nikola Peković	(Serbia) Partizan	13

== Awards ==
=== Euroleague 2007–08 MVP ===
- (Lithuania) Ramūnas Šiškauskas ( (Russia) CSKA Moscow)

=== Euroleague 2007–08 Final Four MVP ===
- (United States) Trajan Langdon ( (Russia) CSKA Moscow)

=== Euroleague 2007–08 Finals Top Scorer ===
- (United States) Will Bynum ( (Israel) Maccbi Tel Aviv)

=== All-Euroleague Team 2007–08 ===
Position	All-Euroleague First Team	Club team	All-Euroleague Second Team	Club team
PG	(United States) Terrell McIntyre	(Italy) Montepaschi Siena	(Greece) Theo Papaloukas	(Russia) CSKA Moscow
SG/SF	(United States) Trajan Langdon	(Russia) CSKA Moscow	(United States) Bootsy Thornton	(Italy) Montepaschi Siena
SG/SF	(Lithuania) Ramūnas Šiškauskas	(Russia) CSKA Moscow	(Israel) Yotam Halperin	(Israel) Maccabi Elite
PF/C	(United States) Terence Morris	(Israel) Maccabi Elite	(Montenegro) Nikola Peković	(Serbia) Partizan
PF/C	(Brazil) Tiago Splitter	(Spain) Tau Cerámica	(Lithuania) Kšyštof Lavrinovič	(Italy) Montepaschi Siena

=== Rising Star ===
- (Italy) Danilo Gallinari ( (Italy) Armani Jeans Milano)

=== Best Defender ===
- (Greece) Dimitris Diamantidis ( (Greece) Panathinaikos)

=== Top Scorer (Alphonso Ford Trophy) ===
- (United States) Marc Salyers ( (France) Roanne)

=== Coach of the Year (Alexander Gomelsky Award) ===
- (Italy) Ettore Messina ( (Russia) CSKA Moscow)

=== Club Executive of the Year ===
- (Italy) Ferdinando Minucci ( (Italy) Montepaschi Siena)

==== Regular season ====
Game	Player	Team	Rating
1	(Montenegro) Nikola Peković	(Serbia) Partizan	40
2	(Lithuania) Artūras Jomantas	(Lithuania) Lietuvos Rytas	29
2	(Slovenia) Erazem Lorbek	(Italy) Lottomatica Roma	29
3	(North Macedonia) Jeremiah Massey	(Greece) Aris	40
4	(Belgium) Tomas Van Den Spiegel	(Poland) Prokom Trefl Sopot	50
5	(Lithuania) Arvydas Macijauskas	(Greece) Olympiacos	41
6	(United States) Dewarick Spencer	(Italy) VidiVici Bologna	44
7	(Puerto Rico) Daniel Santiago	(Spain) Unicaja Málaga	34
8	(United States) Marc Salyers	(France) Roanne	34
9	(Brazil) Tiago Splitter	(Spain) Tau Cerámica	42
10	(United States) Scoonie Penn	(Turkey) Efes Pilsen	38
11	(United States) Loren Woods	(Turkey) Efes Pilsen	35
12	(Central African Republic) Romain Sato	(Italy) Montepaschi Siena	33
12	(Slovenia) Marko Milič	(Slovenia) Union Olimpija	33
12	(United States) Will Solomon	(Turkey) Fenerbahçe Ülker	33
13	(Serbia) Novica Veličković	(Serbia) Partizan	30
14	(Spain) Jordi Trias	(Spain) FC Barcelona	36

==== Top 16 ====
Game	Player	Team	PIR
1	(United States) Lynn Greer	(Greece) Olympiacos	31
2	(Uruguay) Esteban Batista	(Israel) Maccabi Elite	27
3	(Greece) Dimitris Diamantidis	(Greece) Panathinaikos	29
3	(United States) Terence Morris	(Israel) Maccabi Elite	29
4	(United States) Lynn Greer (2)	(Greece) Olympiacos	37
5	(United States) Scoonie Penn (2)	(Turkey) Efes Pilsen	32
5	(Belgium) Axel Hervelle	(Spain) Real Madrid	32
6	(United States) Will Solomon (2)	(Turkey) Fenerbahçe Ülker	34
6	(North Macedonia) Jeremiah Massey (2)	(Greece) Aris	34

==== Playoffs ====
Game	Player	Team	PIR
1-2	(Italy) Gianluca Basile	(Spain) FC Barcelona	22
1-2	(Slovenia) Matjaž Smodiš	(Russia) CSKA Moscow	22
3	(Brazil) Tiago Splitter (2)	(Spain) Tau Cerámica	27

=== MVP of the Month ===
Month	Player	Team
November 2007	(Lithuania) Arvydas Macijauskas	(Greece) Olympiacos
December 2007	(United States) Marcus Brown	(Lithuania) Žalgiris
January 2008	(United States) Terence Morris	(Israel) Maccabi Elite
February 2008	(United States) Bootsy Thornton	(Italy) Montepaschi Siena
March 2009	(Belize) Milt Palacio	(Serbia) Partizan
April 2008	(Lithuania) Ramūnas Šiškauskas	(Russia) CSKA Moscow

== See also ==
- Euroleague 2007–08 Final
- ULEB Cup 2007–08
- EuroCup 2007–08
- EuroLeague Women 2007–08
- 2007–08 Euroleague Individual Statistics
