= Marc-Antoine Pellin =

French basketball player

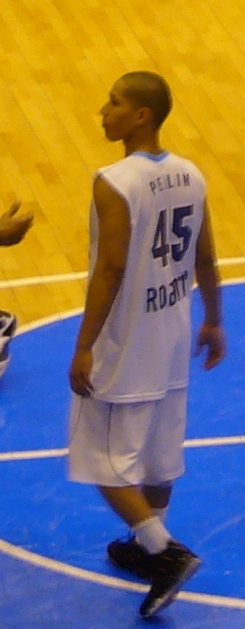
- Marc-Antoine Pellin

Personal information
- Full name: Marc-Antoine Michel Pellin
- Nationality: French
- Born: 8 September 1987 (age 38) Orléans, France

Sport
- Sport: Basketball
Medal record
Men's basketball
Representing France
European U-18 Championship
| Bronze medal – third place | 2004 Spain | U-18 Team |

Marc-Antoine Pellin (born 8 September 1987 in Orléans, France) is a French basketball player. He currently plays for Orléans Loiret Basket. A 1.67 m playmaker, he is a member of the French national team.
