= June 2008 in sports =

<<	June 2008					>>
Su	Mo	Tu	We	Th	Fr	Sa
1	2	3	4	5	6	7
8	9	10	11	12	13	14
15	16	17	18	19	20	21
22	23	24	25	26	27	28
29	30
Sports

This list shows notable sports-related deaths, events, and notable outcomes that occurred in June of 2008.

== Deaths ==
- 7: Jim McKay
- 11: Ove Andersson
- 16: Dick Turner
- 21: Scott Kalitta

== Current sporting seasons ==
- Australian rules football:
  - AFL
- Auto racing 2008:
  - Formula 1
  - Sprint Cup
  - Nationwide
  - Craftsman Truck
  - World Rally Championship
  - IndyCar Series
  - American Le Mans
  - GP2
  - Le Mans Series
  - Rolex Sports Car
  - FIA GT
  - WTCC
  - V8 Supercar
- Baseball 2008:
  - Nippon Professional Baseball
  - Major League Baseball
- Basketball 2008:
  - NCAA (Philippines)
  - Philippine Basketball Association
  - Women's National Basketball Association
- Canadian football:
  - Canadian Football League
- Cycling
  - UCI ProTour
- Football (soccer) 2007–08:
  - Argentina
  - Ecuador
- Football (soccer) 2008:
  - Brazil
  - Japan
  - MLS
  - Norway
- Golf 2008:
  - PGA Tour
  - European Tour
  - LPGA Tour
- Ice hockey 2007–08
  - National Hockey League
- Lacrosse 2008
  - National Lacrosse League
- Motorcycle racing 2008:
  - Moto GP
  - Superbike
- Rugby league
  - Super League
  - NRL
- Rugby union 2007–08:
  - Currie Cup

== Days of the month ==
=== 30 June 2008 (Monday) ===
- Cricket:
  - Asia Cup in Pakistan:
    - Sri Lanka 332–8 (50 overs) beat Bangladesh 174 (38.3 overs) by 158 runs

=== 29 June 2008 (Sunday) ===
- Association football:
  - UEFA Euro 2008 – Final:
    - **Spain** 1–0 Germany
      - Spain win the European championship for the 2nd time, after an interval of 44 years. Fernando Torres scored the winning goal in the 33rd minute.
- Auto racing:
  - Deutsche Tourenwagen Masters: Round 5 at Norisring, Germany
    - (1) Jamie Green (United Kingdom) (2) Bruno Spengler (Canada) (3) Timo Scheider (Germany)
  - NASCAR Sprint Cup: Lenox Industrial Tools 301 in Loudon, New Hampshire

- (1) Kurt Busch (Nevada) (2) Michael Waltrip (Kentucky) (3) J. J. Yeley (Arizona)

- Cricket:
  - Australia in the West Indies:
    - 3rd ODI at St. George's:
  - Asia Cup in Pakistan:
    - Sri Lanka 302–7 (50 overs) beat Pakistan 238–9 (50 overs) by 64 runs
  - Bermuda in Canada:
    - 2nd ODI at King City, Ontario:
- Field hockey:
  - 2008 Men's Hockey Champions Trophy in Rotterdam, Netherlands:
    - Final: Australia 4 – 1 Spain (Australia claim ninth title)
    - Third place play-off: Argentina 2 – 2 Netherlands AET, Argentina win 5 – 3 in penalty shootout
- Golf:
  - PGA Tour:
    - Buick Open in Grand Blanc, Michigan:
  - European Tour:
    - Open de France in France:
  - LPGA Tour:
    - U.S. Women's Open in Edina, Minnesota: Inbee Park, a 19-year-old South Korean, becomes the youngest winner of this event in history.
- Motorcycle racing:
  - Superbike: Misano Superbike World Championship round at Misano Adriatico, Italy:
    - Race 1 (1) Max Neukirchner (Germany) (2) Troy Corser (Australia) (3) Troy Bayliss (Australia)
    - Race 2 (1) Rubén Xaus (Spain) (2) Max Biaggi (Italy) (3) Troy Bayliss (Australia)
- Track and field:
  - In the United States qualifying for the Olympics, Tyson Gay runs the 100-meter dash in a wind-aided 9.68 seconds, the fastest time ever recorded in the event. Because of the wind, the time does not count as a world record. (AP via Yahoo)

=== 28 June 2008 (Saturday) ===
- Auto racing:

- IRL: SunTrust Indy Challenge in Richmond, Virginia

(1) Tony Kanaan (Brazil) (2) Hélio Castroneves (Brazil) (3) Scott Dixon (New Zealand)

- Baseball:
  - The Los Angeles Dodgers defeat the Los Angeles Angels, 1–0, despite not getting a hit. The Dodgers score on an error, a stolen base, another error and a sacrifice fly in the fifth inning. The game does not count as an official no-hitter for Jered Weaver and José Arredondo because the Angels do not bat in the ninth. (AP via Yahoo)
- Boxing: "Lethal Combination" card at Mandalay Bay Resort and Casino, Las Vegas, Nevada
  - (Philippines) Manny Pacquiao knocks out (United States) David Díaz to win the WBC lightweight title.
  - (United States) Steven Luevano fought (Puerto Rico) Mario Santiago to a draw to retain the WBO featherweight title.
  - (United States) Monte Barrett knocks out (United States) Tye Fields on a heavyweight bout.
  - (Mexico) Francisco Lorenzo def. (Mexico) Humberto Soto via disqualification.
- Cricket:
  - New Zealand in England:
    - 5th ODI at Lord's, London: New Zealand 266/5 (50 ov) beat England 215 (47.5 ov) by 51 runs.
      - New Zealand win 5-match series 3–1.
  - Asia Cup in Pakistan:
    - India 284/3 (43.2 ov) beat Bangladesh 283/6 (50 ov) by 7 wickets.
  - Bermuda in Canada:
    - 1st ODI at King City, Ontario
- Football (soccer):
  - 2010 FIFA World Cup qualification (CAF):
    - Group 5: Gabon 2–0 Lesotho
- Motorcycle racing:

- Moto GP: Dutch TT at Assen, Netherlands:

(1) Casey Stoner (Australia) (2) Dani Pedrosa (Spain) (3) Colin Edwards (United States)

- Rugby union:
  - Mid-year Tests:
    - Australia 34–13 France at Sydney
    - Argentina 12–13 Italy at Córdoba
  - Top 14 Final in Saint-Denis, France:
    - Clermont 20–26 **Toulouse**

=== 27 June 2008 (Friday) ===
- Cricket:
  - Australia in the West Indies:
    - 2nd ODI at St. George's: Australia 213/5 (50 ov) beat West Indies 140/8 (41/41 ov) by 63 runs (D/L method).
      - Australia lead 5-match series 2–0.

=== 26 June 2008 (Thursday) ===
- Football (soccer):
  - UEFA Euro 2008 – Semi-finals:
    - **Spain** 3–0 Russia
      - Spain repeat its convincing win over Russia in the group stage, and advance to the final against Germany on Sunday.
- Cricket:
  - Asia Cup in Pakistan:
    - Group A: Sri Lanka 290/9 (50 ov) beat United Arab Emirates 148 (36.3 ov) by 142 runs
    - Group B: India 301/4 (42.1 ov) beat Pakistan 299/4 (50 ov) by 6 wickets
      - Sri Lanka, Bangladesh, India and Pakistan advance to the super fours.

=== 25 June 2008 (Wednesday) ===
- Association football:
  - 2008 Copa Libertadores First Leg of Finals:
    - LDU Quito (Ecuador) 4–2 (Brazil) Fluminense
      - The First Leg of the Copa Libertadores finals was played at a packed Estadio de LDU in Quito by two teams who made their first appearance in the finals. Claudio Bieler of LDU Quito scored first in the 2nd minute, but Fluminense answered back with a goal by Conca in the 12th minute. LDU Quito scored three unanswered goals by the end of the half with goals by Joffre Guerrón (29'), Jairo Campos (34'), and Patricio Urrutia (45'). Thiago Neves scored the only goal of the second half at the 52nd minute. The final score left LDU Quito with a 2-goal advantage going into the next leg.
  - UEFA Euro 2008 – Semi-finals:
    - **Germany** 3–2 Turkey
      - Germany advance to its 6th European final.
- Baseball:
  - 2008 College World Series Final, Game 3:
    - **Fresno State** 6, Georgia 1 — **Fresno State wins series 2–1**
      - The glass slipper fits for Cinderella Fresno State, which becomes the lowest-seeded team to win a national championship in any NCAA sport.
- Cricket:
  - New Zealand in England:
    - 4th ODI at The Oval, London: New Zealand 246/9 (50 ov) beatEngland 245 (49.4 ov) by 1 wicket (with 0 balls remaining).
      - New Zealand lead 5-match series 2–1.
  - Asia Cup in Pakistan:
    - Group A: Sri Lanka 357/9 (50 ov) beat Bangladesh 226/7 (50 ov) by 131 runs.
    - Group B: India 374/4 (50 ov) beat Hong Kong 118 (36.5 ov) by 256 runs.
      - India and Pakistan advance to the next round.

=== 24 June 2008 (Tuesday) ===
- Cricket:
  - Australia in the West Indies:
    - 1st ODI at Kingstown: Australia 273/8 (50 ov) beat West Indies 189 (39.5 ov) by 84 runs
  - Asia Cup in Pakistan:
    - Group A: Bangladesh 300/8 (50 ov.) beat United Arab Emirates 204 (45.4 ov.) by 96 runs
    - Group B: Pakistan 288/9 (50 ov.) beat Hong Kong 133 (37.2 ov.) by 155 runs

=== 23 June 2008 (Monday) ===
- Association football:
  - 2010 FIFA World Cup qualification (CAF):
    - Group 3: Angola 0–0 Uganda

=== 22 June 2008 (Sunday) ===
- Association football:
  - UEFA Euro 2008 – Quarter-finals:
    - **Spain** 0–0 Italy AET, Spain win 4:2 in penalty shootout
      - Spanish goalkeeper Iker Casillas saves two penalties from Daniele De Rossi and Antonio Di Natale, as Spain advance to its first European Championship semifinal since 1984.
  - 2010 FIFA World Cup qualification (AFC):
    Teams in bold qualify to the next round
    - Group 1: **Australia** 0–1 China
    - Group 1: Iraq 0–1 **Qatar**
    - Group 2: **Japan** 1–0 **Bahrain**
    - Group 2: Oman 2–1 Thailand
    - Group 3: **South Korea** 0–0 **North Korea**
    - Group 3: Jordan 2–0 Turkmenistan
    - Group 4: **Saudi Arabia** 4–0 **Uzbekistan**
    - Group 4: Lebanon 1–2 Singapore
    - Group 5: **Iran** 2–0 Kuwait
    - Group 5: **United Arab Emirates** 1–3 Syria
      - Qatar produces the biggest surprise in matchday 6 of Asia's third round of qualifying as Sayed Ali Bechir's second-half strike earn them a 1–0 win over Asian champions Iraq to progress from Group 1 behind Australia. United Arab Emirates, despite losing out to Syria 3–1 at home, still qualify on goal difference to complete Asia's line-up in the next stage.
  - 2010 FIFA World Cup qualification (CAF):
    - Group 1: Cape Verde 3–1 Mauritius
    - Group 2: Zimbabwe 0–0 Kenya
    - Group 2: Guinea 4–0 Namibia
    - Group 3: Angola – Uganda, postponed
    - Group 3: Benin 2–0 Niger
    - Group 5: Ghana 2–0 Gabon
    - Group 7: Mozambique 3–0 Madagascar
    - Group 7: Ivory Coast 4–0 Botswana
    - Group 8: Ethiopia 6–1 Mauritania
    - Group 10: Congo 2–0 Chad
    - Group 10: Mali 3–0 Sudan
    - Group 12: DR Congo 5–1 Djibouti
    - Group 12: Egypt 2–0 Malawi
  - 2010 FIFA World Cup qualification (CONCACAF):
    (first leg scores in brackets)
    - Netherlands Antilles 0–1 (0–0) **Haiti**
    - Barbados 0–1 (0–8) **United States**
    - Guyana 1–2 (0–1) **Suriname**
    - **Cuba** 4–0 (4–3) Antigua and Barbuda
    - Bermuda 0–2 (2–1) **Trinidad and Tobago**
    - **El Salvador** 3–1 (0–1) Panama
      - El Salvador record the biggest upset of the second round as they eliminate 5th ranked Panama.
- Auto racing:

- Formula One: Grand Prix de France at Circuit de Nevers Magny-Cours in Nevers, France

(1) Felipe Massa (Brazil) (2) Kimi Räikkönen (Finland) (3) Jarno Trulli (Italy)

- Indy Racing League: Iowa Corn Indy 250 at Iowa Speedway in Newton, Iowa, United States

(1) Dan Wheldon (United Kingdom) (2) Hideki Mutoh (Japan) (3) Marco Andretti (United States)

- NASCAR Sprint Cup: Toyota/Save Mart 350 at Infineon Raceway in Sonoma, California, USA

(1) Kyle Busch (Nevada) (2) David Gilliland (California) (3) Jeff Gordon (California)

- Motorcycle racing:

- MotoGP: British motorcycle Grand Prix at Donington Park, United Kingdom

(1) Casey Stoner (Australia) (2) Valentino Rossi (Italy) (3) Dani Pedrosa (Spain)

- Rugby union:
  - Top 14 semifinals:
    - **Toulouse** 31–13 Stade Français at Bordeaux

=== 21 June 2008 (Saturday) ===
- Association football:
  - UEFA Euro 2008 – Quarter-finals:
    - **Russia** 3–1 Netherlands AET
      - Russia advance to the semifinal
  - 2010 FIFA World Cup qualification (OFC):
    - New Caledonia 3–0 Vanuatu
  - 2010 FIFA World Cup qualification (CAF):
    - Group 1: Cameroon 2–1 Tanzania
    - Group 4: South Africa 0–0 Sierra Leone
    - Group 4: **Nigeria** 2–0 Equatorial Guinea
      - Nigeria qualify to the next round
    - Group 6: Senegal 3–1 Liberia
    - Group 8: Morocco 2–0 Rwanda
    - Group 9: Burkina Faso 4–1 Seychelles
    - Group 9: Tunisia 2–1 Burundi
    - Group 11: Zambia 1–0 Swaziland
  - 2010 FIFA World Cup qualification (CONCACAF):
    (first leg score in brackets)
    - Saint Lucia 1–3 (0–6) **Guatemala**
    - **Mexico** 7–0 (2–0) Belize
    - **Costa Rica** 3–0 (2–2) Grenada
- Auto racing:

- FIA GT Championship: FIA GT Adria 2 Hours, at Adria International Raceway, Adria, Italy.

(1) Mike Hezemans (Netherlands) & Fabrizio Gollin (Italy) (2) Michael Bartels (Germany) & Andrea Bertolini (Italy) (3) Jean-Denis Délétraz (Switzerland) & Marcel Fässler (Switzerland)

- Rugby union:
  - Mid-year Tests:
    - **New Zealand** 44–12 England at Christchurch
    - **South Africa** 26–0 Italy at Cape Town
  - France:
    - Top 14 semifinals:
      - **Clermont** 21–7 Perpignan at Marseille
    - Rugby Pro D2 promotion playoff final (winners join Toulon in next season's Top 14):
      - Racing Métro 23–32 **Mont-de-Marsan** at Limoges (aet)
- Cricket:
  - New Zealand in England:
    - 3rd ODI at Bristol: New Zealand 182 (50 ov) beat England 160 (46.2 ov) by 22 runs
      - 5-match series level 1–1

=== 20 June 2008 (Friday) ===
- Association football:
  - UEFA Euro 2008 – Quarter-finals:
    - **Turkey** 1–1 Croatia AET, Turkey win 3:1 in penalty shootout
      - In a dramatic climax that followed a rather dull match, Semih Şentürk equalises for Turkey 2 minutes into stoppage time of extra time, 3 minutes after Ivan Klasnić put Croatia ahead. In the penalty shootout, two Croatians (Modrić and Rakitić) miss the goal completely and a third (Petrić) is saved by Rüştü Reçber, as the Turkish team advance to their first EURO semifinal against Germany.
  - 2010 FIFA World Cup qualification (CAF):
    - Group 5: Libya 4–0 Lesotho
    - Group 6: Algeria 1–0 Gambia
  - 2010 FIFA World Cup qualification (CONCACAF):
    - **Canada** 4–1 Saint Vincent and the Grenadines
      - Canada win 7:1 on aggregate.
- Ice hockey:
  - The first round of the 2008 NHL entry draft was held at the Scotiabank Place in Ottawa, Ontario. (NHL)
- Cricket:
  - Australia in the West Indies:
    - Only T20 at Bridgetown, Barbados: West Indies 102/3 (9.1/11 ov) beat Australia 97/3 (11/11 ov) by 7 wickets (with 11 balls remaining)

=== 19 June 2008 (Thursday) ===
- Association football:
  - UEFA Euro 2008 – Quarter-finals:
    - **Germany** 3–2 Portugal
      - Germany advance to the semifinal of EURO for the first time in 12 years and deny Portugal a third successive semifinal.
  - 2010 FIFA World Cup qualification (CONMEBOL):
    - Venezuela 2–3 Chile
      - Chile's win lift it to fourth place, ahead of Brazil.

=== 18 June 2008 (Wednesday) ===
- Association football:
  - UEFA Euro 2008 – Group D:
    - **Spain** 2–1 Greece
    - **Russia** 2–0 Sweden
      - Russia qualify to a quarterfinal match with the Netherlands.
  - 2010 FIFA World Cup qualification (CONCACAF):
    - Bahamas 0–6 **Jamaica**
      - Jamaica win 13:0 on aggregate
  - 2010 FIFA World Cup qualification (CONMEBOL):
    - Bolivia 4–2 Paraguay
    - Ecuador 0–0 Colombia
    - Brazil 0–0 Argentina
      - Paraguay suffer its first defeat to Bolivia, but remain 2 points ahead of Argentina at the top of the group.
- Cricket:
  - New Zealand in England:
    - 2nd ODI at Birmingham: England 162 (24/24 ov); New Zealand 127/2 (19/23 ov); No result
      - England lead 5-match series 1–0

=== 17 June 2008 (Tuesday) ===
- Association football:
  - UEFA Euro 2008 – Group C:
    - **Netherlands** 2–0 Romania
    - **Italy** 2–0 France
      - Italy qualify to a quarterfinal match with Spain.
  - 2010 FIFA World Cup qualification (CONCACAF):
    - Antigua and Barbuda 3–4 Cuba
  - 2010 FIFA World Cup qualification (CONMEBOL):
    - Uruguay 6–0 Peru
- Basketball:
  - NBA Finals, Game 6 at Boston:
    - Boston Celtics 131, Los Angeles Lakers 92 — **Celtics win series 4–2**
      - The Celtics overwhelm the Lakers 131–92 and win their 17th championship, extending their NBA record for most championships won by a single team. Paul Pierce is named the NBA Finals MVP.

=== 16 June 2008 (Monday) ===
- Association football:
  - UEFA Euro 2008 – Group B:
    - **Croatia** 1–0 Poland
    - Austria 0–1 **Germany**
      - Germany goes through to a quarterfinal match with Portugal thanks to a free kick by Michael Ballack, and leaves no host team in the second stage for the first time since the championship was expanded to 8 teams in 1980.
- Golf:
  - U.S. Open at San Diego:
    - Tiger Woods defeats Rocco Mediate after an 18-hole playoff and a 1-hole sudden death playoff.
- Cricket:
  - Australia in the West Indies:
    - 3rd Test at Bridgetown, Barbados: Australia 251 (67.1 ov.) & 439/5(dec) (145 ov.) beat West Indies 216 (58.5 ov.) & 387 (105.4 ov.) by 87 runs
      - **Australia win series 2–0.**

=== 15 June 2008 (Sunday) ===
- Association football:
  - UEFA Euro 2008 – Group A:
    - Switzerland 2–0 **Portugal**
      - Hakan Yakin scores both goals when the Swiss hosts claim their first UEFA Euro win ever against already qualified Portugal.
    - **Turkey** 3–2 Czech Republic
      - Turkey come back from 0–2 deficit in the last 20 minutes to qualify for a quarter-final match against Croatia. The match ends on a dramatic note with Turkish goalkeeper Volkan Demirel being sent off in the 92nd minute for pushing Jan Koller to the ground, and with no substitutions remaining, outfield player Tuncay offered to go in goals. However, the Czechs fail to take advantage of this and Turkey hold on to win.
  - 2010 FIFA World Cup qualification (CAF):
    - Group 1: Mauritius 0–1 Cape Verde
    - Group 4: Equatorial Guinea 0–1 Nigeria
    - Group 5: Lesotho 0–1 Libya
    - Group 6: Liberia 2–2 Senegal
    - Group 7: Madagascar 1–1 Mozambique
    - Group 9: Burundi 0–1 Tunisia
    - Group 11: Swaziland 0–0 Zambia
  - 2010 FIFA World Cup qualification (CONCACAF):
    - Saint Vincent and the Grenadines 0–3 Canada
    - Belize 0–2 Mexico
    - Haiti 0–0 Netherlands Antilles
    - Panama 1–0 El Salvador
    - United States 8–0 Barbados
    - Trinidad and Tobago 1–2 Bermuda
    - Jamaica 7–0 Bahamas
  - 2010 FIFA World Cup qualification (CONMEBOL):
    - Paraguay 2–0 Brazil
    - Argentina 1–1 Ecuador
    - Bolivia 0–2 Chile
      - Paraguay increases its lead in the South American qualifying group to 3 points as it inflicts a first defeat of the campaign on Brazil. Argentina scores 3 minutes into stoppage time by substitute Rodrigo Palacio to avoid a home defeat to Ecuador.
- Auto racing:
  - 24 Hours of Le Mans at the Circuit de la Sarthe, Le Mans, France:

(1) Allan McNish (United Kingdom) Rinaldo Capello (Italy) Tom Kristensen (Denmark)
(2) Nicolas Minassian (France) Marc Gené (Spain) Jacques Villeneuve (Canada)
(3) Franck Montagny (France) Ricardo Zonta (Brazil) Christian Klien (Austria)

In the closest competitive finish in 40 years, Audi win their eighth Le Mans 24 Hours in nine years. In addition to this, Kristensen extended his record as the most successful driver in 24 Hour history, with his eighth victory.

- NASCAR Sprint Cup: LifeLock 400 in Brooklyn, Michigan:

(1) Dale Earnhardt Jr. (North Carolina) (2) Kasey Kahne (Washington (state)) (3) Matt Kenseth (Wisconsin)

- World Rally Championship: Turkish Rally in Kemer, Turkey:

(1) Mikko Hirvonen (Finland) (2) Jari-Matti Latvala (Finland) (3) Sébastien Loeb (France)

- World Touring Car Championship season: Masaryk Circuit at Brno, Czech Republic

(1) Alessandro Zanardi (Italy) (2) Félix Porteiro (Spain) (3) Alain Menu (Switzerland)
(1) Gabriele Tarquini (Italy) (2) Alessandro Zanardi (Italy) (3) Augusto Farfus (Brazil)

- Basketball:
  - NBA Finals, game 5 at Los Angeles:
    - Los Angeles Lakers 103, Boston Celtics 98 — **Celtics lead series 3–2**
      - The Lakers avoid another meltdown thanks to Pau Gasol's inside presence against Kevin Garnett and the Celtics frontline to extend the series to another game.
  - FIBA World Olympic Qualifying Tournament for Women at Madrid, Spain
    - **Brazil** 72–67 Cuba
      - Brazil claims the final place in the Olympic tournament
- Cricket:
  - New Zealand in England:
    - 1st ODI at Chester-le-Street: England 307/5 (50 ov.) beat New Zealand 193 (42.5 ov.) by 114 runs
- Golf:
  - U.S. Open at San Diego:
    - Tiger Woods sinks a 12-foot birdie putt on the 72nd hole to force an 18-hole playoff with Rocco Mediate on Monday. Lee Westwood misses a birdie putt on the same hole that would have put him in the playoff.
- Motorcycle racing:
  - Superbike: German Superbike World Championship round, at Nürburgring, Nürburg, Germany:
  Race 1 (1) Noriyuki Haga (Japan) (2) Troy Bayliss (Australia) (3) Max Neukirchner (Germany)
  Race 2 (1) Noriyuki Haga (Japan) (2) Troy Corser (Australia) (3) Max Neukirchner (Germany)

=== 14 June 2008 (Saturday) ===
- Association football:
  - UEFA Euro 2008 – Group D:
    - **Spain** 2–1 Sweden
    - Russia 1–0 Greece
      - Spain, with David Villa scoring his fourth goal, win Group D while Greece, the defending champions, are eliminated. Sweden and Russia will clash for the second quarter-final spot in the last round, with Sweden needing only a draw.
  - 2010 FIFA World Cup qualification (AFC):
    - Group 1: China 1–2 Iraq
    - Group 1: Qatar 1–3 **Australia**
    - Group 2: Thailand 0–3 **Japan**
    - Group 2: **Bahrain** 1–1 Oman
    - Group 3: **North Korea** 2–0 Jordan
    - Group 3: Turkmenistan 1–3 **South Korea**
    - Group 4: Singapore 0–2 **Saudi Arabia**
    - Group 4: **Uzbekistan** 3–0 Lebanon
    - Group 5: Syria 0–2 **Iran**
    - Group 5: Kuwait 2–3 United Arab Emirates
      - Seven more countries join Uzbekistan in progressing from the third stage of Asian qualification for the 2010 World Cup, leaving only two more spots to be decided next week. Australia qualify in top position in Group 1, but PR China are eliminated, while Iraq only needs to get 1 point in next weeks' meeting with Qatar. In Group 2, Bahrain and Japan progress as expected, while in Group 3 both Koreas qualify – the North's victory over Jordan assured the South of a place even if they had not also beaten Turkmenistan. In Group 4 Saudi Arabia claimed the group's second berth, while in Group 5 Iran sailed through, leaving the United Arab Emirates needing at least a draw against Syria in order to go through. FIFA.com
  - 2010 FIFA World Cup qualification (CAF):
    - Group 1: Tanzania 0–0 Cameroon
    - Group 2: Kenya 2–0 Zimbabwe
    - Group 2: Namibia 1–2 Guinea
    - Group 3: Uganda 3–1 Angola
    - Group 3: Niger 0–2 Benin
    - Group 4: Sierra Leone 1–0 South Africa
    - Group 5: Gabon 2–0 Ghana
    - Group 6: Gambia 1–0 Algeria
    - Group 7: Botswana 1–1 Ivory Coast
    - Group 8: Rwanda 3–1 Morocco
    - Group 9: Seychelles 2–3 Burkina Faso
    - Group 10: Chad 2–1 Congo
    - Group 10: Sudan 3–2 Mali
    - Group 12: Malawi 1–0 Egypt
  - 2010 FIFA World Cup qualification (CONCACAF):
    - Second round, first leg:
      - Guatemala 6–0 Saint Lucia
      - Grenada 2–2 Costa Rica
      - Suriname 1–0 Guyana
    - Second round, second leg:
      - Puerto Rico 2–2 **Honduras**
        Honduras wins 6:2 on aggregate
  - 2010 FIFA World Cup qualification (OFC):
    - Vanuatu 1–1 New Caledonia
  - 2010 FIFA World Cup qualification (CONMEBOL):
    - Peru 1–1 Colombia
    - Uruguay 1–1 Venezuela
- Basketball:
  - FIBA World Olympic Qualifying Tournament for Women at Madrid, Spain:
    - **Brazil** 75–58 Angola
    - **Cuba** 66–58 Japan
      - Brazil and Cuba will face each other in the final game to contend the last spot in the Olympic tournament.
- Rugby union: Mid-year Tests
  - Argentina 14–26 **Scotland** at Buenos Aires
  - **Australia** 18–12 Ireland at Melbourne
  - **New Zealand** 37–20 England at Auckland
  - **South Africa** 37–21 Wales at Pretoria
- Cricket:
  - Tri-Nation Series in Bangladesh in 2008
    - Final-Pakistan 315/3 (50 ov.) beat India 290 (48.2 ov.) by 25 runs

=== 13 June 2008 (Friday) ===
- Association football:
  - UEFA Euro 2008 – Group C:
    - Italy 1–1 Romania
    - **Netherlands** 4–1 France
      - The Netherlands clinch first place and qualify to the quarter-finals. A penalty save by goalkeeper Gianluigi Buffon keeps Italy from elimination, but they remain bottom of the group, together with France.
  - 2010 FIFA World Cup qualification (CAF):
    - Group 8: Mauritania 0–1 Ethiopia
    - Group 12: Djibouti 0–6 DR Congo
- Cricket:
  - New Zealand in England:
    - Only T20 at Manchester: England 127/1 (17.3 ov.) beat New Zealand 123/9 (20 ov.) by 9 wickets.
- Basketball:
  - FIBA World Olympic Qualifying Tournament for Women at Madrid, Spain:
    - **Spain** 82–68 Cuba
    - **Czech Republic** 76–64 Japan
    - **Latvia** 84–26 Angola
    - **Belarus** 86–79 (OT) Brazil
      - Winners qualify to Olympic tournament
- Auto racing:
  - In the NASCAR Nationwide Series, Joey Logano wins the Meijer 300 at Kentucky Speedway. At 18 years, 21 days, he becomes the youngest driver to win an event in the series' history.

=== 12 June 2008 (Thursday) ===
- Association football:
  - UEFA Euro 2008 – Group B:
    - **Croatia** 2–1 Germany
    - Austria 1–1 Poland
      - While Switzerland are eliminated, hope is still alive for their Austrian co-hosts, thanks to a penalty goal on stoppage time. This score also secures the group victory for Croatia, which will face the Czech Republic or Turkey in the quarter-final.
- Basketball:
  - 2008 NBA Finals, Game 4 at Los Angeles:
    - Boston Celtics 97, Los Angeles Lakers 91 — **Celtics lead series 3–1**
      - The Celtics erase a 24-point second-quarter deficit and take command of the series.
- Cricket:
  - Tri-Nation Series in Bangladesh in 2008
    - 3rd ODI-India 223/3 (35.1 ov.) beat Bangladesh 222 (49.5 ov.) by 7 wickets
      - **India and Pakistan are going on to the finals.**

=== 11 June 2008 (Wednesday) ===
- Association football:
  - UEFA Euro 2008 – Group A:
    - Czech Republic 1–3 **Portugal**
    - Switzerland 1–2 Turkey
      - When both matches are finished, Portugal become the first team to advance to the knockout stage, and have already won the group. The second place will be decided by the match between the Czech Republic and Turkey, ending with a penalty shootout if drawn, while the Swiss hosts are the first to be eliminated from the tournament.

=== 10 June 2008 (Tuesday) ===
- Association football:
  - UEFA Euro 2008 – Group D:
    - Spain 4–1 Russia
      - David Villa scores a hat-trick as Spain take the lead in group D.
    - Greece 0–2 Sweden
      - The defending champions start off the tournament with a loss.
- Basketball:
  - 2008 NBA Finals, Game 3 at Los Angeles:
    - Los Angeles Lakers 87, Boston Celtics 81 — **Celtics lead series 2–1**
      - Kobe Bryant and Sasha Vujacic hold off a potential Celtics run at the final minute to win their first game of the series.
  - Former referee Tim Donaghy accuses other referees in the National Basketball Association of rigging games, including Game 6 in the 2002 Western Conference Finals, allowing the Los Angeles Lakers to win that game, the series, and ultimately the 2002 NBA Finals. (ESPN)
- Cricket:
  - Tri-Nation Series in Bangladesh in 2008
    - 2nd Match-India 330/8 (50 ov.) beat Pakistan 190 (35.4 ov.) by 140 runs

=== 9 June 2008 (Monday) ===
- Association football:
  - UEFA Euro 2008 – Group C:
    - Romania 0–0 France
    - Netherlands 3–0 Italy
      - The defending FIFA World Cup champions start off the tournament with a loss.
- Auto racing:

- V8 Supercar: Midas 400, at Sandown Raceway, Melbourne, Australia:

(1) Jamie Whincup (Australia) (2) Mark Winterbottom (Australia) (3) James Courtney (Australia)

- Baseball:
  - Ken Griffey Jr. of the Cincinnati Reds becomes the sixth player in Major League Baseball history to hit 600 career home runs, hitting a two-run homer off the Florida Marlins' Mark Hendrickson in the first inning of the teams' game in Miami.

=== 8 June 2008 (Sunday) ===
- Association football:
  - UEFA Euro 2008 – Group B:
    - Austria 0–1 Croatia
      - Just like co-hosts Switzerland one day earlier, Austria lose their opening match 0–1.
    - Germany 2–0 Poland
      - Germany take the lead in group B as Lukas Podolski (himself born in Poland) becomes the tournament's first double scorer.
- Auto racing:
  - Formula One: Grand Prix du Canada in Circuit Gilles Villeneuve, Montreal, Quebec, Canada
    - (1) Robert Kubica (Poland) (2) Nick Heidfeld (Germany) (3) David Coulthard (United Kingdom)

- Indy Racing League: Bombardier Learjet 550 at Texas Motor Speedway in Fort Worth, Texas, USA

(1) Scott Dixon (New Zealand) (2) Hélio Castroneves (Brazil) (3) Ryan Briscoe (Australia)

- NASCAR Sprint Cup: Pocono 500 in Long Pond, Pennsylvania

(1) Kasey Kahne (Washington (state)) (2) Brian Vickers (North Carolina) (3) Denny Hamlin (Virginia)

- Basketball:
  - 2008 NBA Finals, Game 2 at Boston:
    - Boston Celtics 108, Los Angeles Lakers 102 — **Celtics lead series 2–0**
      - The Celtics almost blew a 24-point fourth quarter lead but with Ray Allen's clutch freethrows put the game away from the Lakers as the series shifts to Los Angeles.
- Cricket:
  - New Zealand in England:
    - 3rd Test in Nottingham: England 364 (126.5 ov.) beat New Zealand 123 (46.3 ov.) & 232 (72.3 ov.) by an innings & 9 runs
      - England win the series 2–0
  - Tri-Nation Series in Bangladesh in 2008
    - 1st Match-Pakistan 233 (39.3/50 ov.) beat Bangladesh 163/8 (40/50 ov.) by 70 runs
      - Match shortened to 40 overs a side due to rain.
- Motorcycle racing:
  - Moto GP F.I.M. Road Racing World Championship: Catalan Grand Prix, at Circuit de Catalunya, Barcelona, Spain.
  (1) Dani Pedrosa (Spain) (2) Valentino Rossi (Italy) (3) Casey Stoner (Australia)
- Shooting:
  - ISSF World Cup in Suhl, Germany
    - Richard Faulds (GBR) equals the world record in Double Trap with 147 hits out of 150, and proceeds to win the final.
- Tennis:
  - 2008 French Open – Men's Singles Final:
    - Rafael Nadal (ESP) def. Roger Federer (SUI) 6–1, 6–3, 6–0
      - Nadal achieves his fourth consecutive French Open title. Not only does he not lose a single set in the tournament; he also remains undefeated on Stade Roland Garros, and once again denies World #1 Federer a career Grand Slam.

=== 7 June 2008 (Saturday) ===
- Association football:
  - UEFA Euro 2008 – Group A:
    - Switzerland 0–1 Czech Republic
      - The hosts of the tournament go down to a defeat, thanks to a solitary goal from Václav Svěrkoš. It was his first goal for his country.
    - Portugal 2–0 Turkey
      - Goals from Pepe and Raul Meireles give Portugal three points towards the Group A standings, which they top on goal difference.
- Thoroughbred Racing
  - 2008 Belmont Stakes – Elmont, New York
    - On the thirtieth anniversary of the last U.S. Triple Crown winner, Affirmed, Kentucky Derby and Preakness winner Big Brown prolonged horse racing's longest losing streak, finishing last in a race that was won by 38–1 long shot Da'Tara, thus the most elusive championship trophy in all of sports will remain unclaimed for at least another year.
  - British Triple Crown
    - 2008 Epsom Derby: (1) New Approach (2) Tartan Bearer (3) Casual Conquest
- Tennis:
  - 2008 French Open – Women's Singles Final:
    - (Serbia) Ana Ivanovic def. (Russia) Dinara Safina 6–4, 6–3
      - Ivanovic, already assured of taking over the world Number 1 ranking from Maria Sharapova regardless of the result in the final, wins her first Grand Slam title. She becomes the first Serbian woman, and second Serbian to win a Grand Slam event.
- Rugby union: Mid-year Tests
  - New Zealand 21–11 Ireland at Wellington
  - South Africa 43–17 Wales at Bloemfontein
  - Argentina 21–15 Scotland at Rosario

=== 5 June 2008 (Thursday) ===
- Basketball:
  - 2008 NBA Finals, Game 1 at Boston:
    - Boston Celtics 98, Los Angeles Lakers 88 — **Celtics lead series 1–0**

=== 4 June 2008 (Wednesday) ===
- Ice hockey:
  - 2008 Stanley Cup Finals, Game 6 at Pittsburgh:
    - Detroit Red Wings 3, Pittsburgh Penguins 2 — **Red Wings win series 4–2**
      - Despite a late goal from the Pens with Marc-André Fleury pulled (and a chance in the dying moments of the game that went wide), Detroit held on to their early lead to win its 11th Stanley Cup. Henrik Zetterberg wins the Conn Smythe Trophy as playoff MVP, while Nicklas Lidström becomes the first European player to captain a Cup-winning side.
      - The Wings' Niklas Kronwall, Mikael Samuelsson, and Zetterberg become the three newest members of the Triple Gold Club, formalized last year by the International Ice Hockey Federation. The Club consists of individuals who have won the Stanley Cup along with gold medals at the Olympics and World Championships.

=== 3 June 2008 (Tuesday) ===
- Cricket:
  - Australia in the West Indies:
    - 2nd Test at North Sound, Antigua: Australia 479/7(dec) (136 ov.) & 244/6(dec) (61.5 ov.) drew with West Indies 352 (107 ov.) & 266/5 (93 ov.).
      - Australia lead 3-match series 1–0.

=== 2 June 2008 (Monday) ===
- Ice hockey:
  - 2008 Stanley Cup Finals, Game 5 at Detroit:
    - Pittsburgh Penguins 4, Detroit Red Wings 3 (3 OT) — **Red Wings lead series 3–2**
      - Detroit Red Wings are only 35 seconds from winning the Stanley Cup when Maxime Talbot ties the game. With a game-winning powerplay goal after 49 overtime minutes, Petr Sýkora forces the series to Pittsburgh for a sixth game.

=== 1 June 2008 (Sunday) ===
- Auto racing:

- Indy Racing League: ABC Supply Company A.J. Foyt 225 at The Milwaukee Mile in West Allis, Wisconsin, USA

(1) Ryan Briscoe (Australia) (2) Scott Dixon (New Zealand) (3) Tony Kanaan (Brazil)

- NASCAR Sprint Cup: Best Buy 400 in Dover, Delaware

(1) Kyle Busch (Nevada) (2) Carl Edwards (Missouri) (3) Greg Biffle (Washington (state))

- World Rally Championship: Acropolis Rally around Athens, Greece

(1) Sébastien Loeb (France) (2) Petter Solberg (Norway) (3) Mikko Hirvonen (Finland)

- World Touring Car Championship season: Pau Grand Prix at Pau, France

(1) Augusto Farfus (Brazil) (2) Yvan Muller (France) (3) Jordi Gené (Spain)
(1) Andy Priaulx (United Kingdom) (2) Nicola Larini (Italy) (3) Rickard Rydell (Sweden)

- Cricket:
  - 2008 Indian Premier League Final
    - Rajasthan Royals 164/7 (20 ov.) beat Chennai Super Kings 163/5 (20 ov.) by 3 wickets
- Cycling:

- 2008 Giro d'Italia

(1) Alberto Contador (Spain) (2) Riccardo Riccò (Italy) (3) Marzio Bruseghin (Italy)

- Team handball:
  - The men's Olympic qualification tournaments are finished. Croatia, France, Iceland, Poland, Russia and Spain claim the last six spots for the Beijing Olympics.
- Motorcycle racing:
  - Moto GP F.I.M. Road Racing World Championship: Italian motorcycle Grand Prix, at Mugello Circuit near Florence, Italy.
  (1) Valentino Rossi (Italy) (2) Casey Stoner (Australia) (3) Dani Pedrosa (Spain)
  - Superbike: United States Superbike World Championship round, at Miller Motorsports Park, Utah, USA:
  Race 1 (1) Carlos Checa (Spain) (2) Troy Corser (Australia) (3) Michel Fabrizio (Italy)
  Race 2 (1) Carlos Checa (Spain) (2) Max Neukirchner (Germany) (3) Michel Fabrizio (Italy)
