= July 2008 in sports =

<<	July 2008					>>
Su	Mo	Tu	We	Th	Fr	Sa
		1	2	3	4	5
6	7	8	9	10	11	12
13	14	15	16	17	18	19
20	21	22	23	24	25	26
27	28	29	30	31
Sports

This list shows notable sports-related deaths, events, and notable outcomes that occurred in July of 2008.

== Deaths ==
- 4: Terrence Kiel
- 12: Bobby Murcer
- 15: Gionata Mingozzi
- 15: György Kolonics

== Current sporting seasons ==
- Australian rules football:
  - AFL
- Auto racing 2008:
  - Formula 1
  - Sprint Cup
  - Nationwide
  - Craftsman Truck
  - World Rally Championship
  - IndyCar Series
  - American Le Mans
  - GP2
  - Le Mans Series
  - Rolex Sports Car
  - FIA GT
  - WTCC
  - V8 Supercar
- Baseball 2008:
  - Nippon Professional Baseball
  - Major League Baseball
- Basketball 2008:
  - NCAA (Philippines)
  - Philippine Basketball Association
  - University Athletic Association of the Philippines
  - Women's National Basketball Association
- Canadian football:
  - Canadian Football League
- Cycling
  - UCI ProTour
- Football (soccer) 2007–08:
  - Argentina
  - Ecuador
- Football (soccer) 2008:
  - Brazil
  - Japan
  - MLS
  - Norway
- Golf 2008:
  - PGA Tour
  - European Tour
  - LPGA Tour
- Ice hockey 2007–08
  - National Hockey League
- Lacrosse 2008
  - National Lacrosse League
- Motorcycle racing 2008:
  - Moto GP
  - Superbike
- Rugby league
  - Super League
  - NRL
- Rugby union 2007–08:
  - Currie Cup

== Days of the month ==
=== 31 July 2008 (Thursday) ===
- Baseball:
  - Trade deadline deals:
    - Manny Ramírez, increasingly alienated from his previous team, the Boston Red Sox, is sent to the Los Angeles Dodgers in a three-way deal. The Bosox receive Jason Bay from the Pittsburgh Pirates, who in turn receive four minor-leaguers, two from the Sox and two from the Dodgers. The Sox will also pay the remaining US$7 million of Ramírez' salary.
    - Ken Griffey Jr. goes from his hometown Cincinnati Reds to the Chicago White Sox for two players.
    - The New York Yankees acquire catcher Iván Rodríguez from the Detroit Tigers for relief pitcher Kyle Farnsworth. (The Windsor Star)

=== 29 July 2008 (Tuesday) ===
- American football:
  - Former Green Bay Packers quarterback and Brett Favre, who had announced his retirement after the 2008 season, faxes a letter seeking reinstatement to the NFL.
- Baseball:
  - Seattle Mariners center fielder Ichiro Suzuki becomes the youngest player ever to amass 3,000 hits in his top-level professional career, reaching the milestone with a single on the first pitch he saw in the first inning of the Mariners' game against the Texas Rangers. The hit gave Ichiro 1,722 Major League Baseball hits to go with the 1,278 he amassed during his nine-year career with the Orix BlueWave in Japan.

=== 27 July 2008 (Sunday) ===
- Cycling:
  - Tour de France – Stage 21 (Étampes > Paris Champs-Élysées):
    - (1) (Belgium) Gert Steegmans (2) (Germany) Gerald Ciolek (3) (Spain) Óscar Freire
      - Carlos Sastre (Spain) wins the Tour de France, becoming the third successive Spanish rider to win the race, and the seventh in the history of the Tour. Cadel Evans (Australia) is 58 seconds later in the General classification, taking second place for the second year in succession. Bernhard Kohl (Austria) finishes in 3rd place.
      - Óscar Freire wins the points (green jersey) competition.
      - Bernhard Kohl wins the King of the Mountain (polka dot jersey) competition, 48 points clear of Sastre.
      - Andy Schleck (Luxembourg) wins the youth (white jersey) competition. www.letour.fr
- Auto racing:
  - Sprint Cup:
    - Allstate 400 at the Brickyard in Speedway, Indiana
      - (1) Jimmie Johnson (California) (2) Carl Edwards (Missouri) (3) Denny Hamlin (Virginia)
  - World Touring Car Championship season: Brands Hatch at Kent, United Kingdom
    - Race 1: (1) Jörg Müller (Germany) (2) Yvan Müller (France) (3) Andy Priaulx (United Kingdom)
    - Race 2: (1) Alain Menu (Switzerland) (2) Félix Porteiro (Spain) (3) Alex Zanardi (Italy)
  - Deutsche Tourenwagen Masters: Round 7 at Nürburgring, Germany
    - (1) Bernd Schneider (Germany) (2) Paul di Resta (United Kingdom) (3) Jamie Green (United Kingdom)
- Golf:
  - PGA Tour:
    - RBC Canadian Open in Oakville, Ontario
      - PGA Tour rookie Chez Reavie (United States) becomes the eighth golfer this season to win his first career PGA Tour event, cruising to a three-shot win over Billy Mayfair (United States) .
  - European Tour:
    - Inteco Russian Open in Russia:
    (1) Mikael Lundberg (Sweden)
  - LPGA Tour:
    - Evian Masters in Evian-les-Bains, France:
      - Helen Alfredsson (Sweden) wins her first LPGA event since 2003 in a sudden-death playoff, eliminating Angela Park (Brazil) on the first extra hole and besting Na Yeon Choi (South Korea) on the third extra hole.
- Tennis:
  - ATP Tour:
    - Canada Masters in Toronto, Ontario, Canada:
    Rafael Nadal (Spain) beat Nicolas Kiefer (Germany) 6–3, 6–2
  - WTA Tour:
    - East West Bank Classic in Carson, California, United States:
    Dinara Safina (Russia) beat Flavia Pennetta (Italy) 6–4, 6–2
    - Banka Koper Slovenia Open in Portorož, Slovenia:
    Sara Errani (Italy) beat Anabel Medina Garrigues (Spain) 6–3, 6–3
- Beach soccer:
  - FIFA World Cup in Marseille, France:
    - Final: Brazil 5–3 Italy.
    Brazil beat Italy in the Plage du Prado to win the World Cup for the third time in a row. This was the first occasion that the FIFA Beach Soccer World Cup has been held outside of Brazil.

=== 26 July 2008 (Saturday) ===
- Auto racing:
  - IRL:
    - Rexall Edmonton Indy in Edmonton, Alberta, Canada
      - (1) Scott Dixon (New Zealand) (2) Hélio Castroneves (Brazil) (3) Justin Wilson (United Kingdom)
- Cricket
  - India in Sri Lanka:
    - 1st Test in Colombo: Sri Lanka 600/6d (162 ov) beat India 223 (72.5 ov) & 138 (45 ov) by an innings and 239 runs.
- Cycling:
  - Tour de France – Stage 20 (Cérilly > Saint-Amand-Montrond) (Time trial):
    - (1) (Germany) Stefan Schumacher (2) (Switzerland) Fabian Cancellara (3) (Luxembourg) Kim Kirchen
      - Cadel Evans (Australia) makes up 29 seconds on Carlos Sastre (Spain) to take second place in the General classification, but remains 1'05" behind Sastre, who seems likely to win the race in Paris tomorrow.
- Rugby union:
  - Tri Nations Series:
    - Australia 34–19 New Zealand at Sydney
      - In the Bledisloe Cup opener, the Wallabies score a decisive win over the All Blacks to take pole position in the series.

=== 25 July 2008 (Friday) ===
- Cycling:
  - Tour de France – Stage 19 (Roanne > Montluçon):
    - (1) (France) Sylvain Chavanel (2) (France) Jérémy Roy (3) (Germany) Gerald Ciolek
      - The top ten positions in the General classification remain unchanged.

=== 24 July 2008 (Thursday) ===
- Cycling:
  - Tour de France – Stage 18 (Le Bourg-d'Oisans > Saint-Étienne):
    - (1) (Germany) Marcus Burghardt (2) (Spain) Carlos Barredo (3) (France) Romain Feillu
      - All the leaders finish together in the peloton, so Carlos Sastre (Spain) maintains his 1'24" lead in the general classification.

=== 23 July 2008 (Wednesday) ===
- Cycling:
  - Tour de France – Stage 17 (Embrun > Alpe d'Huez):
    - (1) (Spain) Carlos Sastre (2) (Spain) Samuel Sánchez (3) (Luxembourg) Andy Schleck
      - Sastre takes the yellow jersey with a 1'24" lead over Fränk Schleck (Luxembourg) .

=== 22 July 2008 (Tuesday) ===
- Cycling:
  - Tour de France – Stage 16 (Cuneo (Italy) > Jausiers):
    - (1) (France) Cyril Dessel (2) (France) Sandy Casar (3) (Spain) David Arroyo
      - Fränk Schleck (Luxembourg) still holds the yellow jersey.

=== 21 July 2008 (Monday) ===
- American football
  - The New York Giants trade tight end Jeremy Shockey to the New Orleans Saints for two draft picks. (AP via Yahoo)
- Cricket
  - South Africa in England:
    - 2nd Test at Headingley, Leeds: South Africa 522 (176.2 ov) & 9/0 (1.1 ov) beat England 203 (52.3 ov) & 327 (107 ov) by 10 wickets.
    South Africa lead 4-match series 1–0

=== 20 July 2008 (Sunday) ===
- American football:
  - The Miami Dolphins trade six-time Pro Bowl defensive end Jason Taylor to the Washington Redskins for two draft picks (NFL.com)
- Auto racing:
  - Formula One:
    - German Grand Prix in Hockenheim, Germany:
      - (1) Lewis Hamilton (United Kingdom) (2) Nelson Piquet Jr. (Brazil) (3) Felipe Massa (Brazil)
  - IRL:
    - Honda 200 at Mid-Ohio Sports Car Course in Lexington, Ohio:
      - (1) Ryan Briscoe (Australia) (2) Dan Wheldon (United Kingdom) (3) Hélio Castroneves (Brazil)
  - V8 Supercar:
    - City of Ipswich 400 at Queensland Raceway in Ipswich, Queensland, Australia
      - (1) Mark Winterbottom (Australia) (2) Russell Ingall (Australia) (3) James Courtney (Australia)
- Basketball:
  - World Olympic Qualifying Tournament for Men in Athens, Greece – 3rd place playoff:
    - Germany 96–82 Puerto Rico
    Germany qualifies for the Olympic tournament for the first time since 1992.
- Cycling:
  - Tour de France – Stage 15 (Embrun > Prato Nevoso):
    - (1) (Australia) Simon Gerrans (2) (Spain) Egoi Martínez (3) (United States) Danny Pate
      - Fränk Schleck (Luxembourg) takes the yellow jersey as the Tour enters Italy, with a seven-second lead over Bernhard Kohl (Austria) and eight seconds over Cadel Evans (Australia) .
      - Four-stage winner Mark Cavendish (United Kingdom) withdraws before the start of the stage, citing fatigue and the need to prepare for the Beijing Olympics, while 2006 Tour de France winner Óscar Pereiro (Spain) , crashes out of the race with a fractured shoulder on the descent from Col Agnel.
- Golf:
  - PGA Tour and European Tour:
    - The Open Championship in Southport, England
      - Defending champion Pádraig Harrington (Republic of Ireland) shakes off a wrist injury to shoot a 1-under par 69 to finish at 283 (+3), giving him a four-stroke victory over Ian Poulter (England) and becoming the first European to win consecutive Opens since James Braid in 1905 and 1906. Third-round leader Greg Norman (Australia) , attempting to become the oldest player ever to win a major, shoots 7-over 77 and finishes in a tie for third, six shots behind Harrington.
  - PGA Tour:
    - U.S. Bank Championship in Milwaukee in Brown Deer, Wisconsin
      - Richard S. Johnson (Sweden) becomes the seventh golfer to record his first career PGA Tour win this season, winning by one shot over Ken Duke (United States) .
  - LPGA Tour:
    - State Farm Classic in Springfield, Illinois
      - Ji Young Oh (South Korea) wins her first career LPGA event, defeating Yani Tseng (Taiwan) on the first hole of a sudden-death playoff.
- Motorcycle racing:
  - Moto GP:
    - United States motorcycle Grand Prix at Mazda Raceway Laguna Seca, Monterey, California, United States:
      - (1) Valentino Rossi (Italy) (2) Casey Stoner (Australia) (3) Chris Vermeulen (Australia)
  - Superbike:
    - Brno Superbike World Championship round at Masaryk Circuit, Brno, Czech Republic:
    - Race 1 (1) Troy Bayliss (Australia) (2) Troy Corser (Australia) (3) Michel Fabrizio (Italy)
    - Race 2 (1) Troy Bayliss (Australia) (2) Michel Fabrizio (Italy) (3) Max Biaggi (Italy)
- Tennis:
  - ATP Tour:
    - Priority Telecom Open in Amersfoort, Netherlands:
    Final: Albert Montañés (Spain) beat Steve Darcis (Belgium) 1–6, 7–5, 6–3
    - Indianapolis Tennis Championships in Indianapolis, United States:
    Final: Gilles Simon (France) beat Dmitry Tursunov (Russia) 6–4, 6–4
    - Austrian Open in Kitzbühel, Austria:
    Final: Juan Martín del Potro (Argentina) beat Jürgen Melzer (Austria) 6–2, 6–1
    - Croatia Open Umag in Umag, Croatia:
    Final: Fernando Verdasco (Spain) beat Igor Andreev (Russia) 3–6, 6–4, 7–6(4)
  - WTA Tour:
    - Bank of the West Classic in Stanford, United States:
    Final: Aleksandra Wozniak (Canada) beat Marion Bartoli (France) 7–5, 6–3
    - Gastein Ladies in Bad Gastein, Austria:
    Final: Pauline Parmentier (France) beat Lucie Hradecká (Czech Republic) 6–4, 6–4

=== 19 July 2008 (Saturday) ===
- Basketball:
  - World Olympic Qualifying Tournament for Men in Athens, Greece – Semifinals:
    - Greece 88–63 Puerto Rico
    - Croatia 76–70 Germany
      - Greece and Croatia qualify to the Olympic tournament. Puerto Rico and Germany will contest the last qualifying spot on Sunday.
- Cycling:
  - Tour de France – Stage 14 (Nîmes > Digne-les-Bains):
    - (1) (Spain) Óscar Freire (2) (Colombia) Leonardo Duque (3) (Germany) Erik Zabel
      - Cadel Evans (Australia) retains his slender advantage of one second over Fränk Schleck (Luxembourg) as the race enters the Alps tomorrow.
- Rugby union:
  - Tri Nations Series:
    - Australia 16–9 South Africa in Perth

=== 18 July 2008 (Friday) ===
- Basketball:
  - World Olympic Qualifying Tournament for Men in Athens, Greece – Quarterfinals:
    - Greece 75–48 New Zealand
    - Germany 78–65 Brazil
    - Puerto Rico 81–70 Slovenia
    - Croatia 83–62 Canada
- Cycling:
  - Tour de France – Stage 13 (Narbonne > Nîmes):
    - (1) Mark Cavendish (United Kingdom) (2) Robbie McEwen (Australia) (3) Romain Feillu (France)
      - Cavendish wins his fourth stage of this Tour. Cadel Evans (Australia) retains the yellow jersey.

=== 17 July 2008 (Thursday) ===
- Cycling:
  - Tour de France – Stage 12 (Lavelanet > Narbonne):
    - (1) Mark Cavendish (United Kingdom) (2) Sébastien Chavanel (3) Gert Steegmans (Belgium)
      - Mark Cavendish becomes the first British cyclist ever to win three stages of the same Tour de France.
      - Cadel Evans (Australia) continues to wear the yellow jersey.
    - Following the expulsion of Riccardo Riccò from the race after he tested positive for EPO, his Saunier Duval–Scott team withdraws from the Tour before the start of Stage 12.

=== 16 July 2008 (Wednesday) ===
- Cycling:
  - Tour de France – Stage 11 (Lannemezan > Foix):
    - (1) Kurt Asle Arvesen (Norway) (2) Martin Elmiger (Switzerland) (3) Alessandro Ballan (Italy)
      - Cadel Evans (Australia) retains the yellow jersey.
- Basketball:
  - World Olympic Qualifying Tournament for Men in Athens, Greece:
    - Group A: Greece 89–69 Brazil
    - Group B: Germany 89–71 New Zealand
    - Group C: Canada 79–77 South Korea
      - Canada overturns 12-pts deficit in the last 3 minutes to secure its place in the quarter-finals.
    - Group D: Croatia 95–81 Puerto Rico

=== 15 July 2008 (Tuesday) ===
- Baseball:
  - MLB All-Star Game at Yankee Stadium in Bronx, New York:
    - American League 4, National League 3, 15 innings.
      - A base hit by Texas' Michael Young ends the longest All-Star Game in time (4 hours and 50 minutes) and tied for longest game innings played (with the 1967 game in Anaheim, California) and gives the AL home field advantage for the sixth straight year in the 2008 World Series.
- Basketball:
  - World Olympic Qualifying Tournament for Men in Athens, Greece
    - Group A: Brazil 94 – 54 Lebanon
    - Group B: Germany 104 – 68 Cape Verde
    - Group C: Slovenia 86 – 70 Canada
    - Group D: Puerto Rico 81 – 72 Cameroon
      - Greece, Brazil, Germany, New Zealand, Slovenia, Croatia and Puerto Rico qualify to the quarterfinals. The last spot will be contested on Wednesday between Canada and Korea.

=== 14 July 2008 (Monday) ===
- Cycling:
  - Tour de France – Stage 10 (Pau > Hautacam):
    - (1) Leonardo Piepoli (Italy) (2) Juan José Cobo (Spain) (3) Fränk Schleck (Luxembourg)
      - Cadel Evans (Australia) takes the yellow jersey, with one second lead over Schleck.
- Cricket:
  - South Africa in England:
    - 1st Test at Lord's, London: England 593/8dec (156.2 ov) drew South Africa 247 (93.3 ov) & 393/3dec (167 ov).
- Basketball:
  - World Olympic Qualifying Tournament for Men in Athens, Greece
    - Group A: Greece 119–62 Lebanon
    - Group B: New Zealand 77–50 Cape Verde
    - Group C: Slovenia 88–76 South Korea
    - Group D: Croatia 93–79 Cameroon

=== 13 July 2008 (Sunday) ===
- Auto racing:
  - World Touring Car Championship season: Autódromo do Estoril at Estoril, Portugal
    - Race 1: (1) Rickard Rydell (Sweden) (2) Nicola Larini (Italy) (3) Yvan Muller (France)
    - Race 2: (1) Tiago Monteiro (Portugal) (2) Yvan Muller (France) (3) Andy Priaulx (United Kingdom)
  - Deutsche Tourenwagen Masters: Round 6 at Zandvoort, Netherlands
    - (1) Mattias Ekström (Sweden) (2) Timo Scheider (Germany) (3) Tom Kristensen (Denmark)
- Cycling:
  - Tour de France – Stage 9 (Toulouse > Bagnères-de-Bigorre):
    - (1) Riccardo Riccò (Italy) (2) Vladimir Efimkin (Russia) (3) Cyril Dessel (France)
      - Kim Kirchen (Luxembourg) continues to wear the yellow jersey.
- Motorcycle racing:
  - Moto GP:
    - German motorcycle Grand Prix at Sachsenring, Hohenstein-Ernstthal, Germany:
      - (1) Casey Stoner (Australia) (2) Valentino Rossi (Italy) (3) Chris Vermeulen (Australia)

=== 12 July 2008 (Saturday) ===
- Auto racing:
  - Sprint Cup:
    - LifeLock.com 400 in Joliet, Illinois
      - (1) Kyle Busch (Nevada) (2) Jimmie Johnson (California) (3) Kevin Harvick (California)
  - IRL:
    - Firestone Indy 200 in Lebanon, Tennessee
      - (1) Scott Dixon (New Zealand) (2) Dan Wheldon (United Kingdom) (3) Hélio Castroneves (Brazil)
- Cycling:
  - Tour de France – Stage 8 (Figeac > Toulouse):
    - (1) Mark Cavendish (United Kingdom) (2) Gerald Ciolek (Germany) (3) Jimmy Casper (France)
    - The last stage before the Tour enters the Pyrenees ends in a mass sprint, with Kim Kirchen (Luxembourg) retaining the yellow jersey.
- Rugby union:
  - Tri Nations Series:
    - New Zealand (15) 28 – (17) 30 South Africa in Dunedin
      - The Springboks defeat the All Blacks two tries to one to break a historic 30 match-unbeaten home record for the All Blacks. It marks the Boks' first win in New Zealand in ten years, and will also return the rugby world champions to the top spot in the IRB World Rankings, which they had lost to the All Blacks last week.

=== 11 July 2008 (Friday) ===
- Cycling:
  - Tour de France – Stage 7 (Brioude > Aurillac):
    - (1) Luis León Sánchez (Spain) (2) Stefan Schumacher (Germany) (3) Filippo Pozzato (Italy)
    - Kim Kirchen (Luxembourg) retains the yellow jersey.
      - At stage's end, news broke of a failed drugs test by Spanish rider Manuel Beltrán. He was ejected from the tour.

=== 10 July 2008 (Thursday) ===
- Cycling:
  - Tour de France – Stage 6 (Aigurande > Super-Besse Sancy):
    - (1) Riccardo Riccò (Italy) (2) Alejandro Valverde (Spain) (3) Cadel Evans (Australia)
      - The first mountain stage of the Tour, an intermediate climbing stage in the Massif Central, sees Kim Kirchen (Luxembourg) take over the yellow jersey as leader of the general classification after previous race leader Stefan Schumacher (Germany) crashes near the finish.

=== 9 July 2008 (Wednesday) ===
- Cycling:
  - Tour de France – Stage 5 (Cholet > Châteauroux):
    - (1) Mark Cavendish (United Kingdom) (2) Óscar Freire (Spain) (3) Erik Zabel (Germany)

=== 8 July 2008 (Tuesday) ===
- Cycling:
  - Tour de France – Stage 4, ITT (Cholet):
    - (1) Stefan Schumacher (Germany) (2) Kim Kirchen (Luxembourg) (3) David Millar (United Kingdom)
      - The first time trial of the Tour causes the expected shakeup in the general classification, with the top five finishers in the stage taking over the top five places, in the same order, in the GC. Schumacher becomes the third different rider in four days to don the yellow jersey.

=== 7 July 2008 (Monday) ===
- Basketball:
  - Former Los Angeles Clippers swingman and free agent Corey Maggette signs with the Golden State Warriors.
- Cycling:
  - Tour de France – Stage 3 (St-Malo > Nantes):
    - (1) Samuel Dumoulin (France) (2) William Frischkorn (United States) (3) Romain Feillu (France)

=== 6 July 2008 (Sunday) ===
- Auto racing:
  - Formula One:
    - British Grand Prix, at Silverstone Circuit, Northamptonshire, Great Britain:
      - (1) Lewis Hamilton (United Kingdom) (2) Nick Heidfeld (Germany) (3) Rubens Barrichello (Brazil)
  - FIA GT Championship:
    - Oschersleben 2 Hours, at Motorsport Arena Oschersleben, Oschersleben, Germany:
      - (1) Karl Wendlinger (Austria) & Ryan Sharp (United Kingdom) (2) Lukas Lichtner-Hoyer (Austria) & Alex Müller (Germany) (3) Jean-Denis Délétraz (Switzerland) & Marcel Fässler (Switzerland)
  - IRL:
    - Camping World Watkins Glen Grand Prix, at Watkins Glen International, Watkins Glen, New York
      - (1) Ryan Hunter-Reay (United States) (2) Darren Manning (United Kingdom) (3) Tony Kanaan (Brazil)
  - V8 Supercar:
    - Skycity Triple Crown, at Hidden Valley Raceway, Darwin, Australia:
      - (1) Steven Richards (New Zealand) (2) Mark Winterbottom (Australia) (3) Garth Tander (Australia)
- Baseball:
  - The Cleveland Indians trade three-time All-Star pitcher CC Sabathia to the Milwaukee Brewers for four minor leaguers. (Yahoo Sports)
  - Seven players from the Chicago Cubs and Boston Red Sox are named to the rosters for next week's 2008 Major League Baseball All-Star Game.
- Cricket:
  - Asia Cup – Final:
    - Sri Lanka 273 (49.5 ov) beat India 173 (39.3 ov) by 100 runs
  - Australia in the West Indies:
    - 5th ODI at Basseterre: Australia 341/8 (50 ov) beat West Indies 172 (39.5 ov) by 169 runs
      - Australia win the series 5–0
- Cycling:
  - Tour de France – Stage 2 (Auray > Saint-Brieuc):
    - (1) Thor Hushovd (Norway) (2) Kim Kirchen (Luxembourg) (3) Gerald Ciolek (Germany)
- Tennis:
  - 2008 Wimbledon Championships – Gentlemen's Singles Final:
    - (Spain) Rafael Nadal def. (Switzerland) Roger Federer 6–4, 6–4, 6–7(5), 6–7(8), 9–7

=== 5 July 2008 (Saturday) ===
- Auto racing:
  - NASCAR Sprint Cup:
    - Coke Zero 400 in Daytona Beach, Florida:

- (1) Kyle Busch (Nevada) (2) Carl Edwards (Missouri) (3) Matt Kenseth (Wisconsin)

- Cycling:
  - Tour de France – Stage 1 (Brest > Plumelec):
    - (1) Alejandro Valverde (Spain) (2) Philippe Gilbert (Belgium) (3) Jérôme Pineau (France)
  - 2008 European Road Championships:
    - Women's U23 road race (gold) Rasa Leleivytė Lithuania, (silver) Lesya Kalytovska Ukraine, (bronze) Marta Bastianelli Russia
    - Men's U23 road race: (gold) Cyril Gautier France, (silver) Paul Voss Germany (bronze) Timofey Kritskiy Russia
- Mixed martial arts:
  - UFC 86 in Las Vegas:
- Rugby union:
  - Tri Nations Series:
    - New Zealand 19–8 South Africa at Wellington
  - Mid-year Tests:
    - Australia 40–10 France at Brisbane
- Tennis:
  - 2008 Wimbledon Championships – Ladies' Singles Final:
    - (United States) Venus Williams def. (United States) Serena Williams 7–5, 6–4

=== 4 July 2008 (Friday) ===
- Cricket:
  - Australia in the West Indies:
    - 4th ODI at Basseterre: Australia 282/8 (50 overs) beat West Indies 281/6 (50 overs) by 1 run.
      - Australia lead 5-match series 4–0.
  - Asia Cup – Super Fours:
    - Pakistan 116/0 (19.4 overs) beat Bangladesh 115/10 (38.2 overs) by 10 wickets (with 182 balls remaining).
      - India and Sri Lanka reach the final

=== 3 July 2008 (Thursday) ===
- Cycling:
  - 2008 European Road Championships:
    - Women's U23 time trial (gold) Ellen van Dijk Netherlands, (silver) Svitlana Halyuk Ukraine, (bronze) Lesya Kalytovska Ukraine
    - Men's U23 time trial: (gold) Adriano Malori Italy, (silver) Timofey Kritskiy Russia, (bronze) Artem Ovechkin Russia
- Cricket:
  - Asia Cup – Super Fours:
    - India 310/4 (46.5 ov) beat Sri Lanka 308/8 (50 ov) by 6 wickets
      - India qualify for the finals
  - Tri-Series in Scotland:
    - New Zealand 102/2 (14.4 ov) beat Scotland 101 (33.2 ov) by 8 wickets
      - New Zealand win the tri-series.

=== 2 July 2008 (Wednesday) ===
- Association football:
  - 2008 Copa Libertadores Final, Second Leg
    - Fluminense (Brazil) 3–1 (5–5 Agg.) (Ecuador) LDU Quito (1–3 penalty shootout)
      - The Second Leg of the Copa Libertadores finals was played at a packed Estádio do Maracanã to crown the champions. Luis Bolaños of LDU Quito scored first in the 6th minute to put LDU Quito up 1–0 in the game, and 5–2 on aggregate. Fluminense answered back with a hat-trick by Thiago Neves with goals on the 12th, 28th, and 56th, minute. The score at the end of regulation was 3–1, leaving the aggregate at 5–5; extra-time was needed. After a scoreless extra-time, the game went on to a penalty shootout. LDU Quito goalkeeper José Francisco Cevallos blocked three of four penalty kicks, while his teammate put in three of four to give LDU Quito their first Copa Libertadores title.
- Basketball:
  - Clay Bennett and the city of Seattle announce a settlement in the city's lawsuit that attempted to keep the NBA's Seattle SuperSonics in the city. Bennett agrees to pay the city US$45 million immediately, with an additional $30 million possible if other conditions are met. The team is now free to move to Oklahoma City for the 2008–09 season, while the Sonics' name and colors will remain with Seattle, and the Sonics' history will be shared between the Oklahoma City team and any future Seattle team. (ESPN)
- Cricket:
  - Asia Cup – Super Fours:
    - Pakistan 309/2 (45.3 ov) beat India 308/7 (50 ov) by 8 wickets (with 27 balls remaining)
  - Tri-Series in Scotland:
    - 2nd Match: Scotland 211/5 (47.3 ov) beat Ireland 210/8 (50 ov) by 5 wickets (with 15 balls remaining)

=== 1 July 2008 (Tuesday) ===
- Cricket:
  - Associates Tri-Series in Scotland:
    - 1st ODI: New Zealand 402/2 (50 ov) beat Ireland 112 (28.4 ov) by 290 runs
      - New Zealand's 290 run win over Ireland is a new world record for the biggest margin of victory by runs. The previous world record was India's 257 run drubbing of Bermuda in the 2007 Cricket World Cup.
  - Bermuda in Canada:
    - 3rd ODI: Canada 276/9 (50 ov) beat Bermuda 199/7 (50 ov) by 77 runs
      - Bermuda wins the 3 match series 2–1.
