= May 2008 in sports =

<<	May 2008					>>
Su	Mo	Tu	We	Th	Fr	Sa
				1	2	3
4	5	6	7	8	9	10
11	12	13	14	15	16	17
18	19	20	21	22	23	24
25	26	27	28	29	30	31
Sports

This list shows notable sports-related deaths, events, and notable outcomes that occurred in May of 2008.

== Deaths ==
- 29: Luc Bourdon
- 9: Jack Gibson
- 3: Eight Belles
- 1: Buzzie Bavasi
- 1: Mark Kendall

== Current sporting seasons ==
- Australian rules football:
  - AFL
- Auto racing 2008:
  - Formula 1
  - Sprint Cup
  - Nationwide
  - Craftsman Truck
  - World Rally Championship
  - IndyCar Series
  - American Le Mans
  - GP2
  - Le Mans Series
  - Rolex Sports Car
  - FIA GT
  - WTCC
- Baseball 2008:
  - Nippon Professional Baseball
  - Major League Baseball
- Basketball 2008:
  - National Basketball Association
  - Philippine Basketball Association
  - Turkish Basketball League
  - Women's National Basketball Association
- Cricket 2008:
  - Indian Premier League
- Cycling
  - UCI ProTour
- Football (soccer) 2007–08:
  - Argentina
  - Ecuador
- Football (soccer) 2008:
  - Brazil
  - Japan
  - MLS
  - Norway
- Golf 2008:
  - PGA Tour
  - European Tour
  - LPGA Tour
- Ice hockey 2007–08
  - National Hockey League
- Lacrosse 2008
  - National Lacrosse League
- Motorcycle racing 2008:
  - Moto GP
  - Superbike
- Rugby league
  - Super League
  - NRL
- Rugby union 2007–08:
  - Top 14

== 31 May 2008 (Saturday) ==
- Athletics:
  - Usain Bolt of Jamaica sets a new world record in the 100 metres, running 9.72 seconds in the Reebok Grand Prix in New York City.
- Baseball:
  - Manny Ramirez becomes the 24th Major League Baseball player with 500 career home runs, connecting off the Baltimore Orioles' Chad Bradford for a solo shot in the seventh inning of a 6–3 Boston Red Sox win over the Orioles at Camden Yards.
- Cricket:
  - 2008 Indian Premier League
    - 2nd Semifinal — Chennai Super Kings 116/1 (14.5 ov.) beat Kings XI Punjab 112/8 (20 ov.) by 9 wickets
  - 2008 ICC World Cricket League Division Five
    - Final-Afghanistan 81/8 (37.4 ov) beat Jersey 80 (39.5 ov.) by 2 wickets
    - 3rd place-Nepal 189 (46.3 ov.) beat United States 93 (42.4 ov.) by 96 runs
    - 5th place-Singapore 119 (42.1 ov.) beat Botswana 104 (37 ov.) by 15 runs
    - 7th place-Germany 157/8 (46.1 ov.) beat Mozambique 153 (45.5 ov.) by 2 wickets
    - 9th place-Norway 182/3 (43.2 ov.) beat Japan 181 (48.2 ov.) by 7 wickets
    - 11th Place-Bahamas 116/4 (35.2 ov.) beat Vanuatu 113 (29.3 ov.) by 6 wickets
- Football:
  - Europeada 2008
    - Danes in Germany 15 Catalans 1
    - Rhaetians 5 Germans in Hungary 1
    - Germans in Denmark 19 North Frissians 4
    - Welsh 0 Germans in Poland 2
    - Aromunians 0 South Tyrol 3
    - Croats in Serbia 0 Roma in Hungary 2
    - Occitaniians 2 Cimbrians 1
    - Sorbs 4 Croats in Romania 1
- Ice hockey:
  - 2008 Stanley Cup Finals, Game 4 at Pittsburgh:
    - Detroit Red Wings 2, Pittsburgh Penguins 1 — Red Wings lead series 3–1
- Rugby union:
  - Guinness Premiership Final at Twickenham, London:
    - London Wasps 26–16 Leicester Tigers
      - In front of a capacity crowd of 81,600, a world record for a club match in rugby union, Wasps give their retiring captain Lawrence Dallaglio a grand send-off by winning their fourth Premiership title in six seasons.
  - Super 14 Final at Christchurch:
    - Crusaders (New Zealand) 20–12 (Australia) Waratahs

== 30 May 2008 (Friday) ==
- Basketball:
  - NBA Eastern Conference Finals, Game 6 at Auburn Hills, Michigan:
    - Boston Celtics 89, Detroit Pistons 81 — Celtics win series 4–2
      - The Celtics advance to their first NBA Finals in over 20 years.
- Cricket:
  - 2008 Indian Premier League
    - 1st Semifinal — Rajasthan Royals 192/9 (20 ov.) beat Delhi Daredevils 87 (16.1 ov.) by 105 runs
  - 2008 ICC World Cricket League Division Five
    - Semifinal 1-Afghanistan 142 (49.3 ov.) beat Nepal 105 (45.5 ov.) by 37 runs
    - Semifinal 2-Jersey 220/5 (50 ov.) beat United States 136 (38.2 ov.) by 84 runs
    - 5th place Semifinal 1-Botswana 126 (45.4 ov.) beat Germany 117 (38.5 ov.) by 9 runs
    - 5th place Semifinal 2-Singapore 203/8 (50 ov.) beat Mozambique 149 (46.4 ov.) by 54 runs
    - 9th place Semifinal 1-Japan 238/6 (50 ov.) beat Vanuatu 139 (39.3 ov.) by 99 runs
    - 9th place Semifinal 2-Norway 202/5 (50 ov.) beat Bahamas 150 (39.5 ov.) by 52 runs

== 29 May 2008 (Thursday) ==
- Association football:
  - Scottish Premier League:
    - Gretna were demoted a further two divisions, due to their financial instability. They are scheduled to play their 2008–09 games in the Scottish Third Division, however this is not certain due to Gretna having no squad members.
  - FA Premier League:
    - Henk ten Cate is relieved of his role as assistant manager of Chelsea, 5 days after the sacking of manager Avram Grant.
- Major League Baseball
  - San Francisco Giants 4, Arizona Diamondbacks 3
    - In a no-decision, pitcher Randy Johnson throws 9 strikeouts, tying him for the second-most strikeouts in an MLB career with Roger Clemens, with 4,672.
- Basketball:
  - NBA Western Conference Finals, Game 5 at Los Angeles:
    - Los Angeles Lakers 100, San Antonio Spurs 92 — Lakers win series 4–1
      - Lakers advance to their first NBA Finals in the post-Shaq era.
- Cricket:
  - 2008 ICC World Cricket League Division Five
    - Singapore 201 (34.5 ov.) beat Japan 67/5 (27/27 ov.) by 52 runs(D/L)
      - Rain shortened Japan's innings to 27 overs
    - Germany 151/4 (37.2 ov.) beat Norway 145 (47.1 ov.) by 6 wickets
    - Mozambique 88/4 (22 ov.) vs. Vanuatu-No Result
    - Nepal 182 (50 ov.) vs. United States-No result
    - The match between Japan and Singapore was a replay from 26 May. All other matches are replays from 28 May. The rained out matches will not be replayed. These matches conclude the group stage of the tournament.
    - Vying for 1st place is Nepal, United States, Jersey, Afghanistan
    - Vying for 5th place is Germany, Mozambique, Singapore, Botswana
    - Vying for 9th place is Norway, Vanuatu, Japan, Bahamas

== 28 May 2008 (Wednesday) ==
- Basketball:
  - NBA Eastern Conference Finals, Game 5 at Boston:
    - Boston Celtics 106, Detroit Pistons 102 — Celtics lead series 3–2
- Cricket:
  - 2008 ICC World Cricket League Division Five
    - Germany vs. Norway-Match abandoned without a ball bowled
    - Mozambique vs. Vanuatu-Match abandoned without a ball bowled
    - Nepal vs. United States-Match abandoned without a ball bowled
    - Afghanistan vs. Jersey-Match abandoned without a ball bowled
    - Bahamas vs. Singapore-Match abandoned without a ball bowled
    - Botswana vs. Japan-Match abandoned without a ball bowled
      - The ICC Event Technical Committee, as per 12.1.6 of the ICC World Cricket League Division 5 Playing Conditions, decided not to replay all of group B's abandoned games(Afghanistan vs. Jersey,Bahamas vs. Singapore,Botswana vs. Japan). Group A's abandoned matches, along with a match between Japan and Singapore are to be played on 29 May.
- Ice hockey:
  - 2008 Stanley Cup Finals, Game 3 at Pittsburgh:
    - Pittsburgh Penguins 3, Detroit Red Wings 2 — Red Wings lead series 2–1
- Shooting:
  - ISSF World Cup in Milan, Italy
    - Christian Reitz (GER), the reigning World Junior Champion, equals the world record in 25 m Rapid Fire Pistol with 591 points and enters the final one point ahead of teammate Ralf Schumann. Increasing the gap to the runner-up by over three points, he then raises Schumann's week-old final world record from 790.0 to 794.0.

== 27 May 2008 (Tuesday) ==
- Basketball:
  - NBA Western Conference Finals at San Antonio, Texas:
    - Los Angeles Lakers 93, San Antonio Spurs 91 — Lakers lead series 3–1
- Cricket:
  - 2008 ICC World Cricket League Division Five
    - United States 107/4 (28.1/33 ov.) beat Germany 104 (32.4/33 ov.) by 6 wickets
      - Match reduced to 33 overs a side due to rain
    - Mozambique 111/7 (33.4/36 ov.) beat Norway 110 (33.2/36 ov.) by 3 wickets
      - Match reduced to 36 overs a side due to rain
    - Nepal 220/9 (46/46 ov.) beat Vanuatu 83 (32.1/46 ov.) by 137 runs
      - Match reduced to 46 overs a side due to rain
    - Singapore 145 (29.3/30 ov.) beat Afghanistan 76 (20.2/30 ov.) by 69 runs
      - Match reduced to 30 overs a side due to rain
    - Bahamas 115 (24.2/26 ov.) tied Japan 115/8 (26/26 ov.)
      - Match reduced to 26 overs a side due to rain
    - Jersey 67/3 (15.1 ov.) beat Botswana 66 (39.3 ov.) by 7 wickets

== 26 May 2008 (Monday) ==
- Basketball:
  - NBA Eastern Conference Finals, Game 4 at Auburn Hills, Michigan:
    - Detroit Pistons 94, Boston Celtics 75 — Series tied 2–2
- Ice hockey:
  - 2008 Stanley Cup Finals, Game 2 at Detroit:
    - Detroit Red Wings 3, Pittsburgh Penguins 0 — Red Wings lead series 2–0
- Cricket:
  - Australian cricket team in the West Indies in 2008
    - 1st Test-Australia 431 (126.5 ov.) & 167 (56.5 ov.) beat West Indies 312 (106 ov.) & 191 (67 ov.) by 95 runs
      - Australia lead the 3 Test series 1–0
  - New Zealand cricket team in England in 2008
    - 2nd Test-England 202 (83.3 ov.) & 294/4 (88 ov.) beat New Zealand 381 (90.3 ov.) & 114 (41.2 ov.) by 6 wickets
      - England lead the 3 Test series 1–0
  - 2008 ICC World Cricket League Division Five
    - Germany 97/3 (28.1 ov.) beat Mozambique 96 (38.2 ov.) by 7 wickets
    - Nepal 204 (49.4 ov.) beat Norway 96 (46.4 ov.) by 108 runs
    - United States 89/3 (19.2/24 ov.) beat Vanuatu 88/9 (24/24 ov.) by 7 wickets
      - Match reduced to 24 overs a side due to rain
    - Afghanistan 129/3 (19.5 ov.) beat Botswana 128 (34.4 ov.) by 7 wickets
    - Jersey 206/4 (32/32 ov.) beat Bahamas 78 (25.2/32 ov.) by 128 runs
      - Match reduced to 32 overs a side due to rain
    - Japan vs. Singapore-Match abandoned without a ball bowled

== 25 May 2008 (Sunday) ==
- Ice hockey:
  - 2008 Memorial Cup final in Kitchener, Ontario:
    - Spokane Chiefs (Western Hockey League) 4, Kitchener Rangers (Ontario Hockey League) 1
- Auto racing:
  - 92nd Indianapolis 500: Indianapolis Motor Speedway in Speedway, Indiana
    - (1) Scott Dixon (New Zealand) (2) Vítor Meira (Brazil) (3) Marco Andretti (United States)
  - Formula One: Monaco Grand Prix in Monte Carlo, Monaco
    - (1) Lewis Hamilton (United Kingdom) (2) Robert Kubica (Poland) (3) Felipe Massa (Brazil)
  - NASCAR Sprint Cup: Coca-Cola 600 in Concord, North Carolina
    - (1) Kasey Kahne (Washington (state)) (2) Kyle Busch (Nevada) (3) Greg Biffle (Washington (state))
- Basketball:
  - NBA Western Conference Finals at San Antonio, Texas:
    - San Antonio Spurs 103, Los Angeles Lakers 84 — Lakers lead series 2–1
- Cricket:
  - 2008 ICC World Cricket League Division Five
    - Afghanistan 49/5 (6.3 ov.) beat Bahamas 46 (24 ov.) by 5 wickets
    - United States 87/0 (14.5 ov.) beat Norway 85 (31.1 ov.) by 10 wickets
    - Nepal 238/7 (50 ov.) beat Mozambique 19 (14.5 ov.) BY 219 runs
      - Mehboob Alam becomes the first bowler to take all ten wickets in an innings in an ICC recognized tournament.
    - Singapore 184/7 (47.3 ov.) beat Botswana 183/9 (50 ov.) by 3 wickets
    - Jersey 125/2 (34.1 ov.) beat Japan 124/8 (50 ov.) by 8 wickets
    - All matches above are replays of abandoned matches from May 24.
- Rugby sevens: IRB Sevens
  - London Sevens at Twickenham
    - Cup Final: Samoa 19–14 Fiji
    - New Zealand clinch the overall series crown with one round to spare by winning the Plate competition.

== 24 May 2008 (Saturday) ==
- Basketball:
  - NBA Eastern Conference Finals at Auburn Hills, Michigan:
    - Boston Celtics 94, Detroit Pistons 80 — Celtics lead series 2–1
- Cricket
  - 2008 ICC World Cricket League Division Five
    - Germany 78/4 (9 ov.) beat Vanuatu 75 (28.1 ov.) by 6 wickets
    - Mozambique 70 (28.5 ov.) vs. Nepal 2/0 (0.1 ov.)- No Result
    - United States 108/1 (21 ov.) vs. Norway- No result
    - Afghanistan 105/5 (24.2 ov.) vs. Bahamas- No result
    - Singapore 91/1 (23 ov.) vs. Botswana- No result
    - Jersey 140/0 (26 ov.) vs. Japan- No result
- Ice hockey:
  - 2008 Stanley Cup Finals, Game 1 at Detroit:
    - Detroit Red Wings 4, Pittsburgh Penguins 0 – Red Wings lead series, 1–0
- Rugby union:
  - Heineken Cup Final in Cardiff
    - Toulouse (France) 13–16 (Ireland) Munster
  - Super 14 semifinals
    - Crusaders (New Zealand) 33–22 (New Zealand) Hurricanes in Christchurch
    - Waratahs (Australia) 28–13 (South Africa) Sharks in Sydney
- Shooting:
  - ISSF World Cup in Milan, Italy
    - Sonja Pfeilschifter (GER) becomes the tenth woman to break maximum 400 points in the qualification round of 10 m Air Rifle, and sets a new final record after a score of 105.0 (out of the possible 109.0) in the final round.

== 23 May 2008 (Friday) ==
- Basketball:
  - NBA Western Conference Finals at Los Angeles:
    - Los Angeles Lakers 101, San Antonio Spurs 71 — Lakers lead series 2–0
- Cricket
  - 2008 ICC World Cricket League Division Five
    - Nepal 70/3 (20.2 ov.) beat Germany 69 (39.4 ov) by 7 wickets
    - United States 150/1 (27.4 ov.) beat Mozambique 148/7 (50 ov.) by 9 wickets
    - Norway 360/3 (50 ov.) beat Vanuatu 177 (39.5 ov.) by 183 runs
    - Afghanistan 179 (35.2 ov.) beat Japan 87 (40.2 ov.) by 92 runs
    - Botswana 205 (48.4 ov.) beat Bahamas 135 (36 ov.) by 70 runs
    - Jersey 189 (49.4 ov.) beat Singapore 96 (41.4 ov.) by 93 runs

== 22 May 2008 (Thursday) ==
- Basketball:
  - NBA Eastern Conference Finals at Boston:
    - Detroit Pistons 103, Boston Celtics 97 — Series tied 1–1
      - Detroit hands Boston its first home loss in the 2008 NBA Playoffs, and takes home court advantage.
- Soccer:
  - 2008 Toulon Tournament:
  - The 36th edition of the U-21 tourny is shaping up as Chile and Japan have already qualified to the semi-finals from group A which included the host France and the 2 time back to back U-21 Euro Champions Netherlands. Chile and Japan meet tomorrow to finalize the group A standings.

== 21 May 2008 (Wednesday) ==
- Association football:
  - 2007–08 UEFA Champions League Final
    - Manchester United (England) 1–1 (England) Chelsea (6–5 penalty shootout)
      - Cristiano Ronaldo kicks off the scoring for the Red Devils in the 26th minute, and Frank Lampard answers for the Blues in the 45th minute. After a clean second half and scoreless extra time, Ronaldo has United's third penalty kick saved by Petr Čech. But John Terry misses the fifth (and what would have been final) penalty kick for Chelsea to make it square again. The Red Devils seal the Champions League/Premier League double when Edwin van der Sar saves Nicolas Anelka's attempt in the seventh round.
- Basketball:
  - NBA Western Conference Finals at Los Angeles:
    - Los Angeles Lakers 89, San Antonio Spurs 85 — Lakers lead series 1–0
      - The Lakers erase a 20-point third-quarter deficit to take the series lead.

== 20 May 2008 (Tuesday) ==
- American football:
  - NFL owners unanimously vote to opt out of the league's collective bargaining agreement with its players' union. This could lead to a season without a salary cap in 2010 and a lockout in 2011. The league, however, said that negotiations for a new agreement will continue. (ESPN)
  - The league's owners also award Super Bowl XLVI (2012) to the soon-to-be-opened Lucas Oil Stadium in Indianapolis.
- Basketball:
  - NBA Eastern Conference Finals at Boston:
    - Boston Celtics 88, Detroit Pistons 79 — Celtics lead series 1–0
  - 2008 NBA draft Lottery:
    - The Chicago Bulls earn the first pick in the draft despite having only a 1.7% chance of winning the lottery. The Miami Heat, with the league's worst record, draw the second pick.

== 19 May 2008 (Monday) ==
- Baseball:
  - Boston Red Sox pitcher Jon Lester throws a no-hitter in Boston's 7–0 home win over the Kansas City Royals. It is the first no-hitter in the majors since teammate Clay Buchholz performed the feat against Baltimore last September. Lester gives up nothing but two walks and strikes out nine. Jason Varitek becomes the first catcher to catch four Major League no-hitters.
- Basketball:
  - NBA Conference Semifinals:
    - Western Conference Semifinals:
      - San Antonio Spurs 91, New Orleans Hornets 82 — Spurs win series 4–3
        - The Spurs, with Manu Ginóbili leading all scorers with 26 and Tim Duncan picking up a double-double, survive a furious fourth-quarter Hornets comeback in New Orleans that saw a 17-point lead reduced to 3 within the last two minutes. They now travel to Los Angeles to start the Western Conference Finals with the Lakers.
- Cricket:
  - New Zealand cricket team in England in 2008
    - 1st Test-England 319 (111.3 ov.) drew with New Zealand 277 (86.2 ov.) & 269/6 (86.2 ov.)
- Ice hockey:
  - 2008 Stanley Cup playoffs
    - Detroit Red Wings 4, Dallas Stars 1 — Red Wings win series 4–2
      - In the Western Conference finals, the Red Wings win the Clarence S. Campbell Bowl as conference champions, and will face the Pittsburgh Penguins in the best-of-seven Stanley Cup Finals.
- Shooting:
  - ISSF World Cup in Munich, Germany
    - Ralf Schumann (GER), the three-time Olympic champion, wins the high-class 25 m Rapid Fire Pistol competition with a new final world record of 790.0 points, 1.2 points higher than his own year-old mark.

== 18 May 2008 (Sunday) ==
- Auto racing:

- Deutsche Tourenwagen Masters: Round 4 at EuroSpeedway, Germany

(1) Paul di Resta (United Kingdom) (2) Timo Scheider (Germany) (3) Mattias Ekström (Sweden)

- FIA GT Championship: Monza 2 Hours in Autodromo Nazionale Monza, Italy

(1) Christophe Bouchut (France) & Xavier Maassen (Netherlands) (2) Alexandre Negrao (Brazil) & Miguel Ramos (Portugal) (3) Philipp Peter (Austria) & Allan Simonsen (Denmark)

- World Rally Championship: Rally d'Italia Sardegna around Porto Cervo, Italy

(1) Sébastien Loeb (France) (2) Mikko Hirvonen (Finland) (3) Jari-Matti Latvala (Finland)

- Ice hockey:
  - 2008 IIHF World Championship:
    - Russia 5–4 Canada
      - Ilya Kovalchuk scores his first goal of the tournament to tie the game with only five minutes left in regulation time, and his second in overtime, giving Russia its second title (24th if combined with the Soviet Union). Silver medalist Dany Heatley is named the tournament's most valuable player after a total of 20 points.
  - 2008 Stanley Cup playoffs:
    - Pittsburgh Penguins 6, Philadelphia Flyers 0 — Penguins win series 4–1
      - The Penguins comfortably win the Pennsylvania derby to win the Prince of Wales Trophy as Eastern Conference champions, and clinch a place in the Stanley Cup Finals.
- Basketball:
  - NBA Conference Semifinals:
    - Eastern Conference Semifinals:
      - Boston Celtics 97, Cleveland Cavaliers 92 — Celtics win series 4–3
        - Paul Pierce scores 41 points, including the clinching free throws with 7.9 seconds left, and the Celtics survive a 45-point onslaught from LeBron James at home.
- Motorcycle racing:
  - Moto GP F.I.M. Road Racing World Championship: French motorcycle Grand Prix, at Le Mans Bugatti Circuit near Le Mans, France.
  (1) Valentino Rossi (Italy) (2) Jorge Lorenzo (Spain) (3) Colin Edwards (United States)

== 17 May 2008 (Saturday) ==
- Association football:
  - 2008 FA Cup final at Wembley Stadium, London
    - Cardiff City 0–1 Portsmouth
      - Nwankwo Kanu's goal in the 37th minute is enough to give Pompey their first major trophy since winning back-to-back league titles in 1949 and 1950 and their first FA Cup since 1939.
- Auto racing:

- NASCAR Sprint Cup: Sprint All-Star Race in Concord, North Carolina

(1) Kasey Kahne (Washington (state)) (2) Greg Biffle (Washington (state)) (3) Matt Kenseth (Wisconsin)

Kahne becomes the first driver to enter the All-Star Race via fan voting to win the non-points race and its $1 million first prize.

- Horse racing:
  - U.S. Triple Crown
    - 2008 Preakness Stakes: (1) Big Brown (2) Macho Again (3) Icabad Crane
      - Big Brown becomes the fourth horse to complete the Derby–Preakness double while still unbeaten, winning by 5¼ lengths. He will be the eleventh horse to enter the Belmont Stakes with a chance at the Triple Crown since Affirmed became the most recent horse to win it in 1978.
- Ice hockey:
  - 2008 IIHF World Championship:
    - Finland 4–0 Sweden
      - Goaltender Niklas Bäckström saves all 36 shots in Quebec City as Finland claims the bronze medals.

== 16 May 2008 (Friday) ==
- Baseball:
  - Jayson Werth hits three home runs and ties a Philadelphia Phillies record with eight runs batted in in the Phillies' 10–3 win over the Toronto Blue Jays.
- 2008 Summer Olympics
  - South African double-amputee sprinter Oscar Pistorius, who had previously been disqualified from participating in the Olympic Games by the IAAF because he uses prosthetic legs, has won an appeal of the decision to the Court of Arbitration for Sport. The IAAF accepted the decision. He is cleared to qualify for individual events, and has already been selected for relay events.
- Basketball:
  - NBA Conference Semifinals:
    - Western Conference Semifinals:
      - Los Angeles Lakers 108, Utah Jazz 105, Lakers win series 4–2
        - A furious comeback from the Jazz on their home floor fizzled out when Deron Williams and Andrei Kirilenko missed three-pointers that could have sent the game into overtime in the dying seconds.
    - The two other ongoing series—New Orleans Hornets–San Antonio Spurs in the Western Conference and the Boston Celtics–Cleveland Cavaliers in the Eastern Conference—were extended to Game 7, with the home teams winning all games so far in both series.

== 15 May 2008 (Thursday) ==
- Baseball:
  - The Oakland A's score an unearned run off Aaron Laffey in the second inning of their 4–2 loss to the Cleveland Indians, ending the scoreless streak of Indians starting pitchers at 44⅓ innings. The streak was the longest of its type in the Major Leagues in 34 years. Tribe starters still haven't given up an earned run in 50⅓ innings. (AP via Yahoo)

== 14 May 2008 (Wednesday) ==
- Association football:
  - 2008 UEFA Cup final in Manchester
    - Zenit St. Petersburg (Russia) 2–0 (Scotland) Rangers
      - Zenit break a scoreless tie in the 72nd minute with an Igor Denisov goal, and the Russians put an exclamation point on their win with a Konstantin Zyryanov goal in added time. The game is marred by rioting among Rangers supporters in the Manchester city centre.
- Tennis:
  - Citing burnout, World No. 1 woman Justine Henin announces her retirement, effective immediately. (AP via ESPN)

== 13 May 2008 (Tuesday) ==
- Basketball:
  - NBA Conference Semifinals:
    - Eastern Conference Semifinals:
      - Detroit Pistons 91, Orlando Magic 86, Detroit wins series 4–1
- National Football League:
  - NFL Commissioner Roger Goodell, in a news conference following a three-hour meeting with former New England Patriots video assistant Matt Walsh regarding the Spygate affair, indicates that the league learned nothing new as a result of the meeting. (AP via ESPN)
- Golf:
  - Annika Sörenstam, the leading money-winner in the history of the LPGA, announces her retirement effective at the end of the 2008 season. (AP via ESPN)

== 12 May 2008 (Monday) ==
- Major League Baseball
  - Toronto Blue Jays 3, Cleveland Indians 0, 10 innings.
    - In the top of the fifth inning during the second game of a doubleheader, Indians second baseman Asdrúbal Cabrera turns the 14th unassisted triple play in MLB history, and the fourth turned by a second baseman. He started it by catching a line drive by Lyle Overbay for the first out, then touched second base to bring the second out on Kevin Mench, and tagged out Marco Scutaro for the third out.
- Tennis
  - 2008 Hamburg Masters
  - 2008 Rome Masters

== 11 May 2008 (Sunday) ==
- Association football:

- Barclays Premiership

- Wigan Athletic 0–2 Manchester United

- Man U win their 10th league title with a win at JJB Stadium. Cristiano Ronaldo's 41st goal of the season and a goal from Ryan Giggs, on his 758th appearance for the club, tying Sir Bobby Charlton's record, score the goals which gives Sir Alex Ferguson the title, by two points.

- Chelsea 1–1 Bolton Wanderers

- Avram Grant's side come up short in their title ambitions, after stuttering to a draw at home to Bolton. Andriy Shevchenko had given the Blues the lead, but a late equaliser from Kevin Davies helped to cement Bolton's place in the Premiership and diminish Chelsea's slim chance of the title.

- Portsmouth 0–1 Fulham

- Fulham complete their escape from the relegation zone with a hard-fought victory at FA Cup finalists Portsmouth. Danny Murphy's goal gave the Londoners the vital three points that they required to relegate both Birmingham City and Reading.

- Birmingham 4–1 Blackburn
- Derby County 0–4 Reading

- Derby County finished the worst season for a Premiership member with one win, eight draws and 29 losses for a total of 11 points and a goal differential of minus-69 (with 20 goals scored as a team, were outscored by three players and 89 against, also premiership records) surpassing the 2003–04 and 2005–06 Sunderland teams, and their 29 losses tied the 2005–06 Black Cats' total losses.

- Everton 3–1 Newcastle
- Middlesbrough 8–1 Manchester City
- Sunderland 0–1 Arsenal
- Tottenham Hotspur 0–2 Liverpool
- West Ham United 2–2 Aston Villa

- Auto racing:

- Formula One: Turkish Grand Prix, at Istanbul Park, Turkey:

(1) Felipe Massa (Brazil) (2) Lewis Hamilton (United Kingdom) (3) Kimi Räikkönen (Finland)

- Le Mans Series: 1000km of Spa in Circuit de Spa-Francorchamps, Belgium

(1) Nicolas Minassian (France) , Marc Gené (Spain) & Jacques Villeneuve (Canada) (2) Alexandre Prémat (France) & Mike Rockenfeller (Germany) (3) Olivier Panis (France) & Nicolas Lapierre (France)

- V8 Supercar: BigPond 400, at Barbagallo Raceway, Australia:

(1) Mark Winterbottom (Australia) (2) Garth Tander (Australia) (3) Jamie Whincup (Australia)

- Motorcycle racing:
  - Superbike: Monza Superbike World Championship round, at Autodromo Nazionale Monza, Italy:
  Race 1 (1) Max Neukirchner (Germany) (2) Noriyuki Haga (Japan) (3) Troy Bayliss (Australia)
  Race 2 (1) Noriyuki Haga (Japan) (2) Max Neukirchner (Germany) (3) Ryuichi Kiyonari (Japan)
- U.S. college basketball:
  - The ESPN series Outside the Lines reports that former USC star O. J. Mayo received thousands of dollars in cash and merchandise from a runner for a sports agent during Mayo's high school career and his only season at USC. These benefits are against NCAA rules. (ESPN)

== 10 May 2008 (Saturday) ==
- Auto racing:

- NASCAR Sprint Cup: Dodge Challenger 500 in Darlington, South Carolina

(1) Kyle Busch (Nevada) (2) Carl Edwards (Missouri) (3) Jeff Gordon (California)

- Major League Baseball:
  - With a 3–2 victory over the Colorado Rockies, San Diego Padres pitcher Greg Maddux becomes just the ninth pitcher in Major League history with 350 career wins. (ESPN.com)
- Shooting:
  - ISSF World Cup in Kerrville, Texas
    - Michael Diamond (AUS) equals his own final world record in Trap, hitting 148 of 150 targets.

== 7 May 2008 (Wednesday) ==
- Ice hockey:
  - National Hockey League:
    - The Toronto Maple Leafs fire head coach Paul Maurice.
- Major League Baseball:
  - Cincinnati Reds rookie Joey Votto hits three of the Reds' seven home runs in their 9–0 win over the Chicago Cubs. Cubs pitcher Jon Lieber gives up four homers in the second inning, becoming the second hurler in team history to give up four home runs in an inning. (AP via Yahoo)

== 6 May 2008 (Tuesday) ==
- Basketball:

- Kobe Bryant of the Los Angeles Lakers wins his first National Basketball Association Most Valuable Player Award.

== 4 May 2008 (Sunday) ==
- Auto racing:

- A1 Grand Prix: Round 10 at Brands Hatch, Great Britain

(1) Narain Karthikeyan (India) (2) Robbie Kerr (United Kingdom) (3) Neel Jani

A1 Team Switzerland win the third A1 Grand Prix season ahead of A1 Team New Zealand and A1 Team Great Britain.

- Deutsche Tourenwagen Masters: Round 3 at Mugello, Italy

(1) Jamie Green (United Kingdom) (2) Paul di Resta (United Kingdom) (3) Tom Kristensen (Denmark)

- Basketball:
  - Euroleague Final Four in Madrid
    - Championship
      - Maccabi Tel Aviv (Israel) 77–91 (Russia) CSKA Moscow
        - Behind a balanced attack that saw six players score in double figures, CSKA win their second Euroleague crown in three years and sixth overall. CSKA's Trajan Langdon, who led the winners with 21 points, is named Final Four MVP.
    - Third place:
      - Montepaschi Siena (Italy) 97–93 (Spain) TAU Cerámica (overtime)
  - NBA Playoffs–First round:
    - Eastern Conference First Round:
      - Boston Celtics 99, Atlanta Hawks 65, Boston wins series 4–3
        - Despite being blown out at the TD Banknorth Garden, the Hawks were able to survive the Celtics at the Philips Arena to force game 7 in which the Celtics easily won.
- Ice hockey – National Hockey League:
  - 2008 Stanley Cup playoffs
    - Eastern Conference Semifinals
      - Pittsburgh Penguins 3, New York Rangers 2 (OT), Pittsburgh wins series 4–1
    - Western Conference Semifinals
      - Dallas Stars 2, San Jose Sharks 1, (4OT), Dallas wins series 4–2
        - Brenden Morrow scores a goal at the 9:03 mark of the fourth overtime period, the fifth-longest game in modern NHL history, to eliminate the Sharks.
- Motorcycle racing:
  - Moto GP F.I.M. Road Racing World Championship: Chinese motorcycle Grand Prix, at Shanghai International Circuit near Shanghai, China.
  (1) Valentino Rossi (Italy) (2) Dani Pedrosa (Spain) (3) Casey Stoner (Australia)

== 3 May 2008 (Saturday) ==
- Track and field:
  - In the Jamaica International Invitational, Usain Bolt runs the 100 meter dash in 9.76 seconds, the second-fastest time ever recorded. Fellow Jamaican Asafa Powell set the world record of 9.74 seconds last year. (AP via Yahoo)
- Auto racing:

- NASCAR Sprint Cup: Crown Royal Presents the Dan Lowry 400 in Richmond, Virginia

(1) Clint Bowyer (Kansas) (2) Kyle Busch (Nevada) (3) Mark Martin (Arkansas)

- Polo
  - 2008 World Polo Championship
    - Chile beats Brazil 11–9 in the final to win the championship for the first time.
- Horse racing:
  - U.S. Triple Crown
    - 2008 Kentucky Derby: (1) Big Brown (2) Eight Belles (3) Denis of Cork
      - Favorite Big Brown wins by 4¾ lengths. Second-place finisher Eight Belles breaks both front ankles during the post-race cool-down and is euthanized.
  - British Triple Crown
    - 2,000 Guineas Stakes: (1) Henrythenavigator (2) New Approach (3) Stubbs Art
- NHL
  - 2008 Stanley Cup playoffs
    - Eastern Conference Semifinals
      - Philadelphia Flyers 6, Montreal Canadiens 4, Philadelphia wins series 4–1

== 2 May 2008 (Friday) ==
- Basketball:
  - Euroleague Final Four in Madrid — semifinals
    - Montepaschi Siena (Italy) 85–93 (Israel) Maccabi Tel Aviv
    - TAU Cerámica (Spain) 79–83 (Russia) CSKA Moscow
  - NBA Playoffs–First round:
    - Eastern Conference First Round:
      - Cleveland Cavaliers 105, Washington Wizards 88, Cleveland wins series 4–2
    - Western Conference First Round:
      - Utah Jazz 113, Houston Rockets 91, Utah wins series 4–2

== 1 May 2008 (Thursday) ==
- NBA:
  - Kevin Durant of the Seattle SuperSonics is named NBA Rookie of the Year.
- NHL
  - 2008 Stanley Cup playoffs
    - Western Conference Semifinals
      - Detroit Red Wings 8, Colorado Avalanche 2, Detroit wins series 4–0
- Association football: UEFA Cup semifinals, second leg
  - Zenit St. Petersburg (Russia) 4–0 (Germany) Bayern Munich: Zenit win 5–1 on aggregate
    - Dick Advocaat's side progress to their first major European final after a dominant performance over the former winners of the tournament. Goals from Pavel Pogrebnyak (2), Konstantin Zyryanov and Viktor Fayzulin inflict the joint-worst defeat suffered by Bayern in European competition. Pogrebnyak will miss the final however, after picking up a yellow card for an elbow to the face of Lúcio, having taken his scoring tally for the competition to 11.
  - Fiorentina (Italy) 0–0 (Scotland) Rangers (aet): 0–0 on aggregate, Rangers win 4–2 on penalties
    - Walter Smith guided his 10-man Rangers team to their first European final since 1972 after a hard-fought display in Florence. Despite having Daniel Cousin sent off in extra time, Rangers held out for the duration and took the game to a penalty shootout. At first, things looked bad for the Scots, when Sébastien Frey brilliantly saved Barry Ferguson's penalty. Kuzmanović, Whittaker, Montolivo and Papac were all successful with their kicks to leave the score at 2–2. Fiorentina's third penalty-taker Fabio Liverani then saw his penalty saved by Neil Alexander to leave the shootout level. Brahim Hemdani then scored to make it 3–2, which meant that Christian Vieri had to score to keep the fate of the shootout in their hands. He ballooned the penalty over the bar, which left Nacho Novo to score the winning penalty and see Rangers into the final.
