= Dai Young =

Professional RU coach and former Wales dual-code international rugby player

- Born: David Young; 26 July 1967 (age 59) Aberdare, Glamorgan, Wales
- Height: 6 ft 2 in (1.88 m)
- Weight: 18 st 7 lb (259 lb; 117 kg)

Rugby union career
- Position: Tighthead prop
- Current team: Cardiff Blues
Senior career
Years	Team	Apps	(Points)
1985–1988	Swansea	42	(4)
1987	Northern Suburbs		
1988–1990	Cardiff	33	(12)
1996–2002	Cardiff	106	(20)
International career
Years	Team	Apps	(Points)
1987–2001	Wales	51	(4)
1989, 1997, 2001	British & Irish Lions	3	(0)
Coaching career
- Years: Team
- 2003–2011: Cardiff Blues
- 2011–2020: Wasps
- 2021–2023: Cardiff Blues
- 2008, 2009, 2011, 2013: Barbarians
- Rugby league career

Playing information
- Position: Prop
Club
Years	Team	Pld	T	G	FG	P
1990–1991	Leeds	7	0			0
1991–1996	Salford	153	15			76
	Total	160	15	0	0	76
Representative
Years	Team	Pld	T	G	FG	P
1990–1996	Wales	13	0			0

David Young (born 26 July 1967) is a Welsh rugby union coach and former rugby union and rugby league player. He was most recently director of rugby at Cardiff Blues.

A prop, he won 51 caps for Wales in rugby union between 1987 and 2002, three caps for the British & Irish Lions, and 14 caps for Wales in rugby league.

After retiring from playing, he first coached Cardiff Blues, before moving to Premiership club Wasps from 2011 to February 2020. He has also coached the Barbarians several times from 2008 to 2013.

== Playing career ==
Born in Aberdare in 1967, Young lived in Penywaun for many years.

He played rugby union at club level for Swansea and Cardiff. Having not been selected to play for Wales in the 1987 Rugby World Cup, Young, then 19, travelled to Australia for the summer to play for Northern Suburbs. When Stuart Evans broke his foot playing against Tonga, Young was on the right side of the world at the right time and was called up to the Welsh squad. He made his début for Wales against England in the quarter-finals.

He toured Australia with the then British Lions in 1989, playing in all three test matches, with the Lions winning the test series 2–1.

Young changed rugby football codes from rugby union to rugby league when he transferred to Leeds in 1990 for a then world record of £150,000. He went on to play for Salford, won 14 caps for Wales and captained Wales in the 1995 Rugby League World Cup.

Young returned to rugby union and Cardiff in 1996, after rugby union became professional. He won a further 37 caps for Wales, reaching a total of 51, then a record number for a prop. He was selected for a further two British & Irish Lions tours – South Africa in 1997 and Australia in 2001. He and Alun Wyn Jones are the only players to have toured with the Lions in three separate decades.

== Coaching career ==
Young became head coach of the Cardiff Blues in 2003, and during his time in charge led the side to the 2008–09 Heineken Cup semi-final and the final of the 2006–07 and 2007–08 Celtic League. In addition, he led to the Blues to the EDF Energy Cup title in 2009 beating Gloucester 50–12 in the final at Twickenham. Young led Cardiff Blues to the European Challenge Cup 2009-10 beating Toulon 28 - 21 at the Stade Velodrome in Marseille. The first time a Welsh team had won a European Competition.

In 2011 he resigned and was appointed Director of Rugby at Wasps (then called London Wasps) after payment of a compensation package. In 2017 and 2020 he led the Wasps to a runner-up finish against Exeter Chiefs in the Premiership final. He returned to Cardiff Blues as Director of Rugby from January 2021 to July 2023.

=== Barbarians ===
Young has been head coach of the Barbarians several times from 2008 to 2013, first on their 2008 end of season tour. He led the Baa-Baas to a victory over Belgium, winning 84–10 in Brussels, but the Barbarians lost 39–14 to Ireland and 17–14 to England. Young led the team to a 35–26 win over England, but lost to Australia 55–7 in Sydney in 2009. In 2011, the Barbarians won 38–32 against England and 31–28 against Wales. In 2013, Young coached them to a 40–12 defeat by England at Twickenham. In 2013 the team also played in Hong Kong against the British & Irish Lions as part of their tour to Australia; the Barbarians lost 8–59, their largest defeat by an international side.
