= Iftikhar Anjum =

Pakistani cricketer (born 1980)

Personal information
- Full name: Rao Iftikhar Anjum
- Born: 1 December 1980 (age 45); Khanewal, Punjab, Pakistan
- Height: 6 ft 3.5 in (192 cm)
- Batting: Right-handed
- Bowling: Right-arm medium

International information
- National side: Pakistan (2004–2009)
- Only Test (cap 186): 3 April 2006 v Sri Lanka
- ODI debut (cap 152): 30 September 2004 v Zimbabwe
- Last ODI: 9 August 2009 v Sri Lanka
- ODI shirt no.: 21
- T20I debut (cap 16): 2 September 2007 v Bangladesh
- Last T20I: 12 August 2009 v Sri Lanka

Domestic team information
- Years: Team
- 2002–present: Zarai Taraqiati Bank
- 1999–2007: Islamabad
- 2000–2001: Agriculture Development Bank
- 2010: Surrey CCC

Career statistics
Competition	Test	ODI	FC	LA
Matches	1	62	133	121
Runs scored	9	234	2,370	488
Batting average	–	15.60	16.01	12.51
100s/50s	0/0	0/0	0/5	0/0
Top score	9*	32	78	39
Balls bowled	84	2,960	22,371	5,845
Wickets	0	77	503	154
Bowling average	–	31.55	23.60	30.11
5 wickets in innings	–	1	30	1
10 wickets in match	–	0	4	0
Best bowling	–	5/30	7/59	5/30
Catches/stumpings	0/–	10/–	69/–	28/–
- Source: CricketArchive (subscription required), 22 December 2013

Rao Iftikhar Anjum (Urdu: راؤ اِفتِخار انجُم) (born 1 December 1980) also known as RAO Anjum, is a former Pakistani cricketer right arm medium fast bowler and right hand batsman. Rao Iftikhar Anjum is another addition to Pakistan's seemingly endless production line of pace bowlers. Iftikhar, however, is more Aaqib Javed than Wasim Akram or Waqar Younis, and his outswinger is considered by many to be as effective as Aaqib's. He can bowl reverse-swing - a prerequisite for Pakistani bowlers, when the ball gets a bit rougher, with good control over his yorkers. Iftikhar has performed consistently well in the domestic circuit since making his debut three years ago. Anjum was a member of the Pakistan team that won the 2009 ICC World Twenty20.

He took more than 200 wickets in Pakistani cricketing competition, before being added to the Pakistani national team, having taken ten wickets in the Patron's Trophy Final in 2004. He was rated the best bowler of the year in domestic circuit by former Pakistan's fast bowler Waleed Malik.

Iftikhar was included in the Pakistani team for the one-day series against India and made his Paktel Cup debut seven months later. He was included in the Pakistani squad to the 2007 Cricket World Cup. He played three games, and took five wickets. Despite a decent haul, his inability to bowl at the death stood out. With the re-emergence of Shoaib Akhtar and Mohammed Asif, chances for Iftikhar Anjum seemed to be few and far between from then on barring injury to any of the other major players.

However, with Shoaib and Asif falling foul of doping controversies, injuries, and disciplinary problems, Iftikhar was again called on and found himself as one of the more senior bowlers as Pakistan won the Kitply Cup in Bangladesh but failed to reach the final of the 2008 Asia Cup which they hosted.

He was signed by Surrey as their overseas player for the first part of the 2010 English season.
