= Eion Katchay =

Canadian cricketer (born 1977)

Personal information
- Full name: Eion Katchay
- Born: 8 December 1977 (age 48); Demerara, Guyana
- Batting: Right-handed
- Bowling: Right-arm fast-medium
- Role: Bowler

International information
- National side: Canada (2008–2009)
- ODI debut (cap 58): 1 July 2008 v Bermuda
- Last ODI: 8 April 2009 v Scotland
- T20I debut (cap 7): 2 August 2008 v Netherlands
- Last T20I: 13 October 2008 v Zimbabwe

Career statistics
Competition	ODI	T20I
Matches	5	4
Runs scored	23	15
Batting average	11.50	15.00
100s/50s	0/0	0/0
Top score	12	8*
Balls bowled	174	60
Wickets	4	3
Bowling average	35.75	23.66
5 wickets in innings	0	0
10 wickets in match	0	0
Best bowling	3/39	1/18
Catches/stumpings	0/–	0/–
- Source: Cricinfo, 11 April 2009

Eion Katchay (born 8 December 1977) is a Guyanese-born cricketer who has played four One Day Internationals and four Twenty20 Internationals for Canada. He played for Guyana's under-19 team. His first ODI Matches debut had July 1, 2008, Canada vs Bermuda at King City. His first debut at T20 Matches was on August 2, 2008, Netherlands vs Canada at Belfast.
