= Bermudian cricket team in Canada in 2008 =

	Bermuda	Canada
- Dates: 28 June 2008 – 1 July 2008
Captains	Irving Romaine	Zubin Surkari

One Day International series
- Results: Bermuda won the 3-match series 2–1
Most runs	Steven Outerbridge 106; Irving Romaine 83; Jekon Edness 73	Abdool Samad 169; Ashish Bagai 149; Sunil Dhaniram 84
Most wickets	Tamauri Tucker 6 George O'Brien & Rodney Trott 4	Sunil Dhaniram 8 Qaiser Ali 4 Eion Katchay 3

The Bermudian cricket team toured Canada between 28 June and 1 July 2008. The two teams played 3 One-day Internationals.

== ODI series ==
=== 1st ODI ===
28 June
(scorecard)

Canada; 155/9 (36 overs)	v	Bermuda; 158/7 (35.3 overs)
Ashish Bagai 60 (96); Tamauri Tucker 2/25 (5 overs)		Chris Foggo 60 (86); Qaiser Ali 3/28 (4 overs)

Bermuda won by 3 wickets
Maple Leaf North-West Ground, King City
Umpires: Gary Baxter (NZ) & Roger Dill (BER)
Player of the match: Chris Foggo

- Match reduced to 36 overs a side due to rain

=== 2nd ODI ===
29 June
(scorecard)

Bermuda; 201/8 (50 overs)	v	Canada; 184 (45.3 overs)
Rodney Trott 48* (100); Sunil Dhaniram 5/32 (10 overs)		Sunil Dhaniram 79 (86); George O'Brien 3/31 (10 overs)

Bermuda won by 11 runs(D/L)
Maple Leaf North-West Ground, King City
Umpires: Gary Baxter (NZ) & Roger Dill (BER)
Player of the match: Sunil Dhaniram

- Canada's innings reduced to 47 overs due to rain. Canada's reduced target is 196 from 47 overs.

=== 3rd ODI ===
1 July
(scorecard)

Canada; 276/9 (50 overs)	v	Bermuda; 199/7 (50 overs)
Abdool Samad 130 (125); Tamauri Tucker 4/56 (10 overs)		Irving Romaine 60 (94); Eion Katchay 3/39 (10 overs)

Canada won by 77 runs
Maple Leaf North-West Ground, King City
Umpires: Gary Baxter (NZ) & Roger Dill (BER)
Player of the match: Abdool Samad
