= 2008 Kitply Cup =

2008 Kitply Cup Tri Series
- Date: 8–14 June 2008
- Location: Bangladesh
- Result: Won by Pakistan
- Player of the series: Salman Butt (Pak)
Teams
Bangladesh	Pakistan	India
Captains
Mohammad Ashraful	Shoaib Malik	MS Dhoni
Most runs
Raqibul Hasan (97)	Salman Butt (208)	Gautam Gambhir (209)
Most wickets
Abdur Razzaq (4)	Umar Gul (9)	Praveen Kumar( 5)

The 2008 Kitply cup, was a tri-series One Day International cricket tournament that was held in Bangladesh from 8 to 14 June 2008, between three test playing nations Bangladesh, Pakistan and India. In the final, Pakistan won the tournament by defeating India by 25 runs.

== Squads ==
ODI Squads
Bangladesh	India	Pakistan
Mohammad Ashraful (c)	Mahendra Singh Dhoni (c), (wk)	Shoaib Malik (c)
Mushfiqur Rahim (wk)	Virender Sehwag	Salman Butt
Mashrafe Mortaza	Gautam Gambhir	Nasir Jamshed
Abdur Razzak	Robin Uthappa	Younis Khan
Alok Kapali	Yuvraj Singh	Mohammad Yousuf
Dolar Mahmud	Rohit Sharma	Misbah-ul-Haq
Farhad Reza	Suresh Raina	Shahid Afridi
Mahmudullah	Yusuf Pathan	Kamran Akmal (wk)
Mehrab Hossain	Irfan Pathan	Sohail Khan
Nazimuddin	Praveen Kumar	Umar Gul
Raqibul Hasan	Piyush Chawla	Sohail Tanvir
Shahadat Hossain	Rudra Pratap Singh	Rao Iftikhar
Shahriar Nafees	Ishant Sharma	Wahab Riaz
Tamim Iqbal	Manpreet Gony	Fawad Alam
Dhiman Ghosh	Pragyan Ojha	Bazid Khan
Junaid Siddique		Naumanullah
Mosharraf Hossain		
Rubel Hossain		

== Fixtures ==
=== Points table ===
Pos	Team	Pld	W	L	T	NR	Pts	NRR
1	India	2	2	0	0	0	10	2.373
2	Pakistan	2	1	1	0	0	5	−0.778
3	Bangladesh	2	0	2	0	0	0	−1.789

=== Group stage ===
8 June 2008
17:00 (D/N)
Scorecard

Pakistan; 233 (39.3 overs)	v	Bangladesh; 163/8 (40 overs)
Salman Butt 70 (84); Abdur Razzak 3/35 (7.3 overs)		Mohammad Ashraful 56* (93); Shahid Afridi 3/19 (8 overs)

Pakistan won by 70 runs
Sher-e-Bangla Cricket Stadium, Dhaka
Umpires: Asoka de Silva (SL) and Enamul Haque (Ban)
Player of the match: Salman Butt (Pak)

- Bangladesh won the toss and elected to field.
- Rain reduced the match to 40 overs per side.

10 June 2008
15:00 (D/N)
Scorecard

India; 330/8 (50 overs)	v	Pakistan; 190 (35.4 overs)
Virender Sehwag 89 (76); Umar Gul 3/61 (10 overs)		Shoaib Malik 53 (67); Piyush Chawla 4/40 (8.4 overs)

India won by 140 runs
Sher-e-Bangla Cricket Stadium, Dhaka
Umpires: Asoka de Silva (SL) and Enamul Haque (Ban)
Player of the match: Virender Sehwag (Ind)

- India won the toss elected to bat.

12 June 2008
15:00 (D/N)
Scorecard

Bangladesh; 222 (49.5 overs)	v	India; 223/3 (35.1 overs)
Raqibul Hasan 89 (117); RP Singh 3/46 (10 overs)		Gautam Gambhir 107(101); Abdur Razzak 1/48 (10 overs)

India won by 7 wickets
Sher-e-Bangla Cricket Stadium, Dhaka
Umpires: Asoka de Silva (SL) and Nadir Shah (Ban)
Player of the match: Gautam Gambhir (Ind)

- Bangladesh won the toss elected to bat.

=== Final ===
14 June 2008
15:00 (D/N)
Scorecard

Pakistan; 315/3 (50 overs)	v	India; 290 (48.2 overs)
Salman Butt 129 (136) (retired hurt); Irfan Pathan 2/59 (10 overs)		Mahendra Singh Dhoni 64 (59); Umar Gul 4/57 (9 overs)

Pakistan won by 25 runs
Sher-e-Bangla Cricket Stadium, Dhaka
Umpires: Asoka de Silva (SL) and Nadir Shah (Ban)
Player of the match: Younis Khan (Pak)

- Pakistan won the toss elected to bat.
- Pakistan won the 2008 Kitply Cup.
