= 2008 June rugby union tests =

The 2008 mid-year rugby union tests (also known as the Summer Internationals in the Northern Hemisphere) refers to the international rugby union played from May to July 2008; they were mostly in the Southern Hemisphere. For Australia, New Zealand and South Africa they were preparation for the 2008 Tri-Nations. The Barbarians, an invitational club side, also conducted a three-match tour.

== Overview ==
=== Series ===
Tour	Result	Victor
New Zealand v England test series	2–0	New Zealand
South Africa v Wales test series	2–0	South Africa
Argentina v Scotland test series	1–1	Drawn
Australia v France test series	2–0	Australia

=== Other tours ===
Team/Tour	Opponents
Barbarians end of season tour	Belgium (won) – Ireland (lost) – England (lost)
Italy tour	South Africa (lost) – Argentina (won)
Ireland tour	New Zealand (lost) – Australia (won)

== Barbarians matches ==
24 May 2008
(not a test)
16:00 CEST (UTC+02)

Belgium	10 – 84	Barbarians
		Tries: G. Thomas (4)

Stade Roi Baudouin, Brussels

27 May 2008
19:45 BST (UTC+01)

Ireland	39 – 14	Barbarians
Tries: Bowe, Heaslip (2), Horgan (2); Con: Wallace (4); Pen: Wallace (2)		Tries: Newby, Wannenburg; Con: Hewat (2)

Kingsholm, Gloucester

1 June 2008
15:00 BST (UTC+01)

England	17 – 14	Barbarians
Try: Easter 14' c Tait 64' c Con: Flood; Brown; Pen: Flood		Try: Mapusua 50' c G. Thomas 79' c Con: Gomarsall; Jackson

Twickenham, London
Referee: George Clancy (Ireland)

== International matches ==
7 June 2008
15:30 AST (UTC-03)

Argentina	21 – 15	Scotland
Tries: Tejeda 22' c Tiesi 80' m Con: Todeschini; Pen: Todeschini (3) 19', 56', 74'		Pen: Paterson (5) 3', 24', 34', 42', 47'

Estadio Gigante de Arroyito, Rosario
Attendance: 33,000
Referee: Alan Lewis (Ireland)

7 June 2008
19:35 NZST (UTC+12)

New Zealand	21 – 11	Ireland
Try: Sivivatu 14' m Nonu 61' c Con: Carter; Pen: Carter (3)		Try: P. Wallace 21' m Pen: O'Gara (2)

Westpac Stadium, Wellington
Attendance: 33,743
Referee: Chris White (England)

7 June 2008
15:00 SAST (UTC+02)

South Africa	43 – 17	Wales
Try: Jantjes 31' c de Villiers 47' c Spies 56' c Montgomery 71' c Con: James (4); Pen: James (5)		Try: Roberts 37' c S. Williams 67' c Con: S. Jones; Hook; Pen: S. Jones

Vodacom Park, Bloemfontein
Attendance: 32,685
Referee: Dave Pearson (England)

14 June 2008
16:10 AST (UTC-03)

Argentina	14 – 26	Scotland

José Amalfitani Stadium, Buenos Aires
Referee: Alain Rolland (Ireland)

14 June 2008
20:05 AEST (UTC+10)

Australia	18 – 12	Ireland
Try: Barnes 6' m Horwill 21' c Con: Giteau; Pen: Giteau (2)		Try: Leamy 15' c O'Driscoll 62' m Con: O'Gara

Telstra Dome, Melbourne
Attendance: 47,500
Referee: Christophe Berdos (France)

14 June 2008
19:35 NZST (UTC+12)

New Zealand	37 – 20	England
Try: Smith 22' c Carter 28' c Muliaina 43' c Sivivatu 46' c Con: Carter (4); Pen: Carter (3)		Try: Ojo 38', 72' c Con: Barkley (2); Pen: Barkley (2)

Eden Park, Auckland
Attendance: 45,000
Referee: Nigel Owens (Wales)

14 June 2008
15:00 SAST (UTC+02)

South Africa	37 – 21	Wales
Try: De Villiers (2) 11' c, 67' c Januarie 18' c Du Plessis 80' c Con: James (4); Pen: James (3)		Try: Cooper 22' c S. Williams 28' m Con: S. Jones (1); Pen: S. Jones (3)

Loftus Versfeld, Pretoria
Attendance: 45,000
Referee: Lyndon Bray (New Zealand)

21 June 2008
19:35 NZST (UTC+12)

New Zealand	44 – 12	England
Try: Kahui, Carter, Nonu,c; Lauaki,c; Cowan,c; Con: Carter (4), Donald, Pen: Carter (3)		Try: Care,c; Varndell m Con: Barkley

AMI Stadium, Christchurch
Referee: Jonathan Kaplan (South Africa)

21 June 2008
15:00 SAST (UTC+02)

South Africa	26 – 0	Italy
Try: Steyn, B. du Plessis (2), Mtawarira, Con: Steyn (3)

Newlands, Cape Town
Referee: George Clancy (Ireland)

28 June 2008
15:00 AST (UTC-03)

Argentina	12 – 13	Italy
Pen: Hernández (2), Bosch (2)		Try: Ghiraldini c Con: Marcato; Pen: Marcato (2)

Estadio Córdoba, Córdoba
Referee: Matt Goddard (Australia)

28 June 2008
20:05 AEST (UTC+10)

Australia	34 – 13	France
Try: Giteau 36' c Sharpe 42' c Elsom 46' c Mortlock 60' c Con: Giteau (4); Pen: Giteau (2) 19' 50'		Try: Palisson 64' c Con: Trinh-Duc (1); Pen: Yachvili (2) 21' 40+2'

ANZ Stadium, Sydney
Attendance: 48,899
Referee: Marius Jonker (South Africa)

5 July 2008
20:05 AEST (UTC+10)

Australia	40 – 10	France
Tries: Hynes 6' c, Horwill 36' c, Cross (2) 58' c, 67' c Con: Giteau (4); Pen: Giteau 4', 16', 24', 30'		Tries: Trinh-Duc 79' c Con: Yachvili; Pen: Trinh-Duc 40'

Suncorp Stadium, Brisbane
Referee: Paul Honiss (New Zealand)

9 August 2008
15:00 SAST (UTC+02)

South Africa	63 – 9	Argentina
Tries: Jacobs 31' c Nokwe 34' c Spies 42' c Pietersen (2) 48' c, 76' c du Preez 53' c van Niekerk (2) 60' c, 62' c du Plessis 70' c Con: James (9)		Pen: Contepomi (3)

Ellis Park, Johannesburg
Referee: Wayne Barnes (England)

3 September 2008
19:35 NZST (UTC+12)

New Zealand	101 – 14	Samoa
Try: Muliaina (3); Smith (2); Kahui (2); Thomson; Cowan; Donald; Williams; Kahui; Teoava; Weepu; Penalty try Con: Carter (6); Donald (7)		Try: Mai; Faosiliva; Con: Mai; Warren

Yarrow Stadium, New Plymouth
Attendance: 25,000
Referee: Stuart Dickinson (Australia)

== See also ==
- Mid-year rugby union test series
- 2008 end-of-year rugby union tests
- 2008 Asian Five Nations
- 2008 Churchill Cup
- 2008 IRB Pacific Nations Cup
- 2008 IRB Nations Cup
