= 2008 Barbarians end of season tour =

Summary
P	W	D	L
Total
3	1	0	2
Test match
3	1	0	2
Opponent
P	W	D	L
Belgium XV
1	1	0	0
Ireland XV
1	0	0	1
England XV
1	0	0	1

The 2008 Barbarians rugby union tour was a series of matches played in May 2008 in by Barbarians F.C. They played for the first time against Belgium, then against England and Ireland

== Results ==
24 May 2008

Belgium XV	10–84	Barbarians

Brussels

27 May 2008

Ireland XV	39–14	Barbarians
	report

Welford Road Stadium, Gloucester

1 June 2008

England XV	17–14	Barbarians
	report

Twickenham Stadium, London

== Other matches in 2008 ==
During the year, the Barbarians, made other appearance against different teams

- The Mobbs Memorial Match

18 March 2008

Bedford Blues	19–27	Barbarians

Goldington Road, Bedford

- 150th anniversary of Edinburgh Academicals

4 September 2008

Edinburgh Academicals	0–43	Barbarians
	report

Raeburn Place, Edinburgh

- Remembrance match

4 November 2008

Combined Services	14–33	Barbarians

Plymouth

- Olympic Centenary

3 December 2008

Barbarians	11–18	Australia XV

Wembley Stadium, London
