= Australian cricket team in the West Indies in 2008 =

International cricket tour

	West Indies	Australia
- Dates: 16 May 2008 – 6 July 2008
Captains	Ramnaresh Sarwan	Ricky Ponting

Test series
- Result: Australia won the 3-match series 2–0
Most runs	Shivnarine Chanderpaul (442)	Ricky Ponting (323)
Most wickets	Fidel Edwards (15)	Brett Lee (18)
- Player of the series: Shivnarine Chanderpaul (WI)

One Day International series
- Results: Australia won the 5-match series 5–0
Most runs	Chris Gayle (180)	Shane Watson (206)
Most wickets	Fidel Edwards (6)	Nathan Bracken (8); Mitchell Johnson (8)
- Player of the series: Shane Watson (Aus)

Twenty20 International series
- Results: West Indies won the 1-match series 1–0
Most runs	Xavier Marshall (36)	Luke Ronchi (36)
Most wickets	Kemar Roach (2)	Shane Watson (1)
- Player of the series: Xavier Marshall (WI)

The Australian cricket team toured the West Indies between 16 May and 6 July 2008, outside the normal West Indies cricket season. Australia won two of three Test matches played (one being a draw) and all five One-day Internationals. The West Indies won the single Twenty20 International game.

== Squads ==
Australia					West Indies				
Name	Domestic	Batting style	Bowling style	Notes	Name	Domestic	Batting style	Bowling style	Notes
Batsmen					Batsmen				
Matthew Hayden	(Queensland)	Left Handed Opening Batsmen	Right-arm Medium	Test & ODI Returned To Australia Injured	Devon Smith		Left Handed Opening Batsmen	Right-arm Offbreak	Test Only
Phil Jaques	(New South Wales)	Left Handed Opening Batsman	Left-arm Medium	Test Only	Ramnaresh Sarwan (c)	(Guyana)	Right Handed Middle Order	Part-time Right-arm Offbreak	Test & ODI
Ricky Ponting (c)	(Tasmania)	Right-handed Top Order	Right-arm Medium	Test & ODI	Shivnarine Chanderpaul	(Guyana)	Left Handed Middle Order	Right-arm Legbreak	Test & ODI
Michael Hussey	(Western Australia)	Left Handed Middle Order/Opener	Right-arm Medium	Test & ODI	Runako Morton		Right Handed Middle Order	Right-arm Offbreak	Test Only
Simon Katich	(New South Wales)	Left Handed Opening Batsman/Middle Order	Slow left-arm wrist-spin	Replaced Hayden as Test Opener	Brenton Parchment	(Jamaica)	Right Handed Opening Batsman	Right-arm Offbreak	Test Only
Brad Hodge	(Victoria (state))	Right Handed Middle Order	Right-arm Offbreak	Test Only	Xavier Marshall	(Jamaica)	Right Handed Opening Batsman	Right-arm Offbreak	Replaced Parchment as an opener; Test, Twenty & ODI
David Hussey	(Victoria (state))	Right Handed Middle Order	Right-arm Offbreak	ODI Only	Sewnarine Chattergoon	(Guyana)	Left Handed Opening Batsman	Legbreak	Test Only; Injured and unable to play ODIs
Shaun Marsh	(Western Australia)	Left Handed Opening Batsman	Slow Left Arm	ODI Only	Chris Gayle	(Jamaica)	Left Handed Opening Batsman	Right-arm Offbreak	Test & ODI
					William Perkins	(Trinidad and Tobago)	Right Handed Opening Batsman		Twenty20 Only
					Andre Fletcher		Right Handed Middle Order Batsman	Right-arm Medium-Fast	Twenty20 & ODI
					Shawn Findlay	(Jamaica)	Left Handed Middle Order Batsman	Right-arm Medium	ODI Only
Wicket-keeper					Wicket-keeper				
Brad Haddin	(New South Wales)	Right Handed Lower Order		Test & ODI Returned to Australia injured after 1st ODI	Denesh Ramdin	(Trinidad and Tobago)	Right Handed Lower Order		Test, Twenty20 & ODI
Luke Ronchi	(Western Australia)	Right Handed Opening Batsman/Lower Order		Test & ODI Backup Wicketkeeper	Patrick Browne	(Barbados)	Right Handed Lower Order		ODI Backup Wicketkeeper
All-rounders					All-rounders				
Michael Clarke (vc)	(New South Wales)	Right Handed Middle Order	Slow Left Arm	Test & ODI	Dwayne Bravo (vc)	(Trinidad and Tobago)	Right Handed Middle Order	Right-arm Medium-Fast	Test, Twenty20 & ODI
Andrew Symonds	(Queensland)	Right Handed Middle Order	Right-arm Medium/Right-arm Offbreak	Test & ODI	Darren Sammy		Right Handed Middle Order	Right-arm Medium Fast	Test, Twenty20 & ODI
Beau Casson	(New South Wales)	Right Handed Lower Order	Slow left-arm wrist-spin	Test Only	Ryan Hinds	(Barbados)	Left Handed Lower Order	Slow Left Arm	Test Only
James Hopes	(Queensland)	Right Handed Middle Order	Right-arm Medium	ODI Only	Kieron Pollard	(Trinidad and Tobago)	Right Handed Middle Order Batsman	Right-arm Medium-Fast	Twenty20 & ODI
Cameron White	(Victoria (state))	Right Handed Lower Order	Right-arm Legbreak	ODI Only					
Shane Watson	(Queensland)	Right Handed Middle Order/Opener	Right-arm Fast-Medium	ODI Only, Replaced Mathew Hayden					
Bowlers					Bowlers				
Brett Lee	(New South Wales)	Right Handed Lower Order	Right-arm Fast	Test & ODI	Fidel Edwards	(Barbados)	Right Handed Tail Ender	Right-arm Fast	Test, Twenty20 & ODI
Stuart Clark	(New South Wales)	Right Handed Tail Ender	Right-arm Fast-Medium	Test & ODI	Daren Powell	(Jamaica)	Right Handed Tail Ender	Right-arm Fast Medium	Test & ODI
Stuart MacGill	(Western Australia)	Right Handed Tail Ender	Right-arm Legbreak	Test Only, Retired Second Test	Jerome Taylor	(Jamaica)	Right Handed Tail Ender	Right-arm Fast	Test, Twenty20 & ODI
Mitchell Johnson	(Queensland)	Left Handed Tail Ender	Left-arm Fast-Medium	Test & ODI	Sulieman Benn	(Barbados)	Left Handed Lower Order	Slow Left Arm	Test, Twenty20 & ODI
Ashley Noffke	(Queensland)	Right Handed Tail Ender	Right-arm Fast-Medium	First Choice Test Backup	Amit Jaggernauth	(Trinidad and Tobago)	Right Handed Tail Ender	Right-arm Offbreak	Test Only
Doug Bollinger	(New South Wales)	Left Handed Tail Ender	Left-arm Fast	Likely Test Backup	Kemar Roach	(Barbados)	Right Handed Tail Ender	Right-arm Fast Medium	Twenty20 Only
Nathan Bracken	(New South Wales)	Right Handed Tail Ender	Left-arm Medium-Fast	ODI Only	Nikita Miller	(Jamaica)	Right Handed Tail Ender	Slow Left Arm	ODI Only

== Tour matches ==
=== Three-day : Jamaica Select XI vs Australians ===
16–18 May
Scorecard

Jamaica Select XI	v	Australians
297 (69 overs); Carlton Baugh 111* (112); Stuart MacGill 4/79 (21 overs)		396 (113.3 overs); Simon Katich 97 (193); Donovan Sinclair 3/14 (6.3 overs)
194 (58.2 overs); Carlton Baugh 36 (38); Simon Katich 4/15 (5.2 overs)		65/1 (13.3 overs); Simon Katich 37 (49); Andre Russell 1/25 (7 overs)

Match drawn
Trelawny Stadium, Greenfields, Trelawny, Jamaica
Umpires: Vivian Johnson (WI) and Norman Malcolm (WI)
Player of the match: Simon Katich (Aus)

=== 50-over : University of West Indies Vice Chancellor's XI v Australians ===
21 June
Scorecard

Australians; 337/6 (50 overs)	v	University of West Indies Vice Chancellor's XI; 126 (33.1 overs)
Shane Watson 95 (85); Kemar Roach 2/47 (8 overs)		Denesh Ramdin 43; Nathan Bracken 3/25 (8 overs)

Australians won by 211 runs
Three Ws Oval, Bridgetown, Barbados
Umpires: Vincent Bullen (WI) and Anthony Farrell (WI)

== Test series ==
=== 1st Test ===
22–26 May
Scorecard

Australia	v	West Indies
431 (126.5 overs); Ricky Ponting 158 (224); Fidel Edwards 5/104 (26.5 overs)		312 (106 overs); Shivnarine Chanderpaul 118 (276); Stuart Clark 3/59 (19 overs)
167 (55.5 overs); Andrew Symonds 79 (118); Dwayne Bravo 4/47 (18.5 overs)		191 (67 overs); Denesh Ramdin 36 (61); Stuart Clark 5/32 (20 overs)

Australia won by 95 runs
Sabina Park, Kingston, Jamaica
Umpires: Aleem Dar (Pak) and Russell Tiffin (Zim)
Player of the match: Stuart Clark (Aus)

- Australia won the toss and elected to bat.
- Bad light ended both day 3 and day 4 early.

=== 2nd Test ===
30 May – 2 June
Scorecard

Australia	v	West Indies
479/7d (136 overs); Simon Katich 113 (248); Jerome Taylor 3/95 (27 overs)		352 (107 overs); Shivnarine Chanderpaul 107* (236); Brett Lee 5/59 (21 overs)
244/6d (61.5 overs); Phil Jaques 76 (136); Fidel Edwards 2/28 (7.5 overs)		266/5 (93 overs); Ramnaresh Sarwan 128 (241); Brett Lee 3/51 (21 overs)

Match drawn
Sir Vivian Richards Stadium, North Sound, Antigua and Barbuda
Umpires: Mark Benson (Eng) and Russell Tiffin (Zim)
Player of the match: Shivnarine Chanderpaul (WI)

- Australia won the toss and elected to bat.
- Australia's innings was interrupted by rain in both innings. Stuart MacGill played his last international match

=== 3rd Test ===
12–16 June
Scorecard

Australia	v	West Indies
251 (67.1 overs); Andrew Symonds 52 (84); Jerome Taylor 3/46 (12 overs)		216 (58.5 overs); Shivnarine Chanderpaul 79* (142); Mitchell Johnson 4/41 (11.5 overs)
439/5d (145 overs); Simon Katich 157 (332); Sulieman Benn 3/154 (47 overs)		387 (105.4 overs); Xavier Marshall 85 (146); Stuart Clark 3/58 (24 overs)

Australia won by 87 runs
Kensington Oval, Bridgetown, Barbados
Umpires: Aleem Dar (Pak) and Mark Benson (Eng)
Player of the match: Simon Katich (Aus)

- West Indies won the toss and elected to field.
- Rain ended day 1 early.

== T20I series ==
=== Only T20I ===
20 June
Scorecard

Australia; 97/3 (11 overs)	v	West Indies; 102/3 (9.1 overs)
Luke Ronchi 36 (22); Kemar Roach 2/29 (3 overs)		Xavier Marshall 36 (15); Shane Watson 1/17 (2.1 overs)

West Indies won by 7 wickets
Kensington Oval, Bridgetown, Barbados
Umpires: Clyde Duncan (WI) and Billy Doctrove (WI)
Player of the match: Xavier Marshall (WI)

- West Indies won the toss and elected to field.
- Rain reduced match to 11 overs per side.

== ODI series ==
=== 1st ODI ===
24 June
Scorecard

Australia; 273/8 (50 overs)	v	West Indies; 189 (39.5 overs)
Shaun Marsh 81 (97); Darren Sammy 2/31 (7 overs)		Darren Sammy 33 (35); Nathan Bracken 4/31 (5.5 overs)

Australia won by 84 runs
Arnos Vale Ground, Kingstown, Saint Vincent
Umpires: Asad Rauf (Pak) and Billy Doctrove (WI)
Player of the match: Shaun Marsh (Aus)

- West Indies won the toss and elected to field.

=== 2nd ODI ===
27 June
Scorecard

Australia; 213/5 (50 overs)	v	West Indies; 140/8 (41 overs)
Michael Hussey 62 (105); Jerome Taylor 2/47 (10 overs)		Shivnarine Chanderpaul 45* (77); Michael Clarke 3/26 (6 overs)

Australia won by 63 runs (D/L)
National Cricket Stadium, St. George's, Grenada
Umpires: Asad Rauf (Pak) and Norman Malcolm (WI)
Player of the match: Michael Clarke (Aus)

- Australia won the toss and elected to bat.

=== 3rd ODI ===
29 June
Scorecard

West Indies; 223 (48 overs)	v	Australia; 227/3 (40.3 overs)
Chris Gayle 53 (54); Nathan Bracken 3/26 (9 overs)		Shane Watson 126 (122); Darren Sammy 1/20 (4 overs)

Australia won by 7 wickets
National Cricket Stadium, St George's, Grenada
Umpires: Asad Rauf (Pak) and Norman Malcolm (WI)
Player of the match: Shane Watson (Aus)

- Australia won the toss and elected to field.
- Shane Watson (Aus) scored his first century in ODIs.

=== 4th ODI ===
4 July
Scorecard

Australia; 282/8 (50 overs)	v	West Indies; 281/6 (50 overs)
Andrew Symonds 87 (78); Fidel Edwards 2/53 (10 overs)		Chris Gayle 92 (92); Brett Lee 3/64 (10 overs)

Australia won by 1 run
Warner Park, Basseterre, Saint Kitts
Umpires: Asad Rauf (Pak) and Steve Bucknor (WI)
Player of the match: Andrew Symonds (Aus)

- West Indies won the toss and elected to field.

=== 5th ODI ===
6 July
Scorecard

Australia; 341/8 (50 overs)	v	West Indies; 172 (39.5 overs)
Andrew Symonds 66 (80); Ramnaresh Sarwan 3/57 (9 overs)		Shawn Findlay 59* (74); Mitchell Johnson 5/29 (7.5 overs)

Australia won by 169 runs
Warner Park, Basseterre, Saint Kitts
Umpires: Asad Rauf (Pak) and Steve Bucknor (WI)
Player of the match: Luke Ronchi (Aus)

- Australia won the toss and elected to bat.
