= March 2008 in sports =

<<	March 2008					>>
Su	Mo	Tu	We	Th	Fr	Sa
						1
2	3	4	5	6	7	8
9	10	11	12	13	14	15
16	17	18	19	20	21	22
23	24	25	26	27	28	29
30	31
Sports

This list shows notable sports-related deaths, events, and notable outcomes that occurred in March of 2008.

== Deaths ==
- 30: David Leslie
- 30: Richard Lloyd
- 27: Jean-Marie Balestre
- 25: Ben Carnevale
- 16: Bill Brown
- 5: Derek Dooley

== Current sporting seasons ==
- Australian rules football:
  - AFL
- Auto racing 2008:
  - A1 Grand Prix
  - Formula 1
  - Sprint Cup
  - Nationwide
  - Craftsman Truck
  - World Rally Championship
  - IRL
  - American Le Mans
  - GP2 Asia Series
  - Le Mans Series
  - Rolex Sports Car
  - WTCC
- Baseball 2008:
  - Nippon Professional Baseball
  - Major League Baseball
- Basketball 2008:
  - British Basketball League
  - EuroCup
  - Euroleague
  - National Basketball Association
  - Philippine Basketball Association
  - Russian Basketball Super League
  - Turkish Basketball League
  - ULEB Cup
- Cricket 2007:
  - England
- Cycling
  - UCI ProTour
- Football (soccer) 2007–08:
  - Argentina
  - Denmark
  - England
  - Ecuador
  - France
  - Germany
  - Italy
  - Spain
  - UEFA Champions League
  - UEFA Cup
- Football (soccer) 2008:
  - Brazil
  - Japan
  - MLS
  - Norway
- Golf 2008:
  - PGA Tour
  - European Tour
  - LPGA Tour
- Ice hockey 2007–08
  - National Hockey League
- Lacrosse 2008
  - National Lacrosse League
- Motorcycle racing 2008:
  - Moto GP
  - Superbike
- Rugby league
  - Super League
  - NRL
- Rugby union 2007–08:
  - Super 14
  - IRB Sevens
  - Heineken Cup
  - English Premiership
  - Celtic League
  - Top 14

== 30 March 2008 (Sunday) ==
- Auto racing:
  - World Rally Championship: 28º Rally Argentina, in Córdoba Province, Argentina:
  (1) Sébastien Loeb (France) (2) Chris Atkinson (Australia) (3) Dani Sordo (Spain)
  - NASCAR Sprint Cup: Goody's Cool Orange 500 in Martinsville, Virginia:
  (1) Denny Hamlin (United States) (2) Jeff Gordon (United States) (3) Jeff Burton (United States)
- Motorcycle racing:
  - Moto GP F.I.M. Road Racing World Championship: Spanish motorcycle Grand Prix, at Circuito Permanente de Jerez in Jerez de la Frontera, Spain.
  (1) Dani Pedrosa (Spain) (2) Valentino Rossi (Italy) (3) Jorge Lorenzo (Spain)
- Basketball: NCAA Men's Division I Basketball Tournament regional finals:
  - South: (1) Memphis 85, (2) Texas 67
  - Midwest: (1) Kansas 59, (10) Davidson 57
  - For the first time since seeding of all tournament teams began in 1979, all four regional top seeds advanced to the Final Four.
- Baseball:
  - 2008 MLB Opening Day:
    - National League:
    Washington Nationals 3, Atlanta Braves 2 — Ryan Zimmerman hits a walk-off home run to give the Nationals a win in their first game in Nationals Park.
- Track Cycling
  - 2008 UCI Track Cycling World Championships
    - Women's scratch: (1) Ellen van Dijk (NED), (2) Yumari González (CUB), (3) Belinda Goss (AUS)
    - Women's keirin: (1) Jennie Reed (USA), (2) Victoria Pendleton (GBR), (3) Christin Muche (GER)
    - Men's omnium: (1) Hayden Godfrey, (2) Leigh Howard, (3) Aliaksandr Lisouski

== 29 March 2008 (Saturday) ==
- 154th Boat Race: Oxford beat Cambridge to win for the 74th time.
- Association football:
  - English Premier League:
    - Derby are relegated from the top-flight after just one season, after drawing their 32nd league game 2–2 with Fulham. Coupled with Birmingham's 3–1 victory over Manchester City, Derby are 19 points behind 17th place with only 18 points available from the last 6 games.
  - Scottish Premier League:
    - Crisis-hit Gretna are relegated from the SPL after one season, with a 2–0 defeat to the team directly above them, St Mirren.
- Auto racing:

- IndyCar Series: GAINSCO Auto Insurance Indy 300 in Homestead-Miami Speedway, Florida

(1) Scott Dixon (New Zealand) (2) Marco Andretti (United States) (3) Dan Wheldon (United Kingdom)

- Basketball: NCAA Men's Division I Basketball Tournament regional finals:
  - West: (1) UCLA 76, (3) Xavier 57
  - East: (1) North Carolina 83, (3) Louisville 73

== 28 March 2008 (Friday) ==
- Basketball: NCAA Men's Division I Basketball Tournament regional semifinals:
  - Midwest: (10) Davidson 73, (3) Wisconsin 56
  - Midwest: (1) Kansas 72, (12) Villanova 57
  - South: (2) Texas 82, (3) Stanford 62
  - South: (1) Memphis 92, (5) Michigan State 74

== 27 March 2008 (Thursday) ==
- Basketball: NCAA Men's Division I Basketball Tournament regional semifinals:
  - East: (1) North Carolina 68, (4) Washington State 47
  - East: (3) Louisville 79, (2) Tennessee 60
  - West: (3) Xavier 79, (7) West Virginia 75 (Overtime)
  - West: (1) UCLA 88, (12) Western Kentucky 78
- Cricket
  - Sri Lankan cricket team in West Indies in 2007–08
    - 1st Test-Sri Lanka 476/8(dec) (162 ov.) & 240/7(dec) (57 ov.) beat West Indies 280 (111.5 ov.) & 315 (106.2 ov.) by 121 runs

== 26 March 2008 (Wednesday) ==
- Cricket
  - English cricket team in New Zealand in 2007–08
    - 3rd Test-England 253 (96.1 ov.) & 467/7(dec) (131.5 ov.) beat New Zealand 168 (48.4 ov.) & 431 (118.5 ov.) by 121 runs
      - England wins the series 2–1

== 25 March 2008 (Tuesday) ==
- Major League Baseball: 2008 Opening Series, at Tokyo Dome, Tokyo, Japan
  - Boston Red Sox 6, Oakland Athletics 5 (10 innings)
    - Brandon Moss secures a tie with his first major-league home run in the ninth inning, while Manny Ramírez drives in two runs with a double in the tenth inning to secure the victory.

== 24 March 2008 (Monday) ==
- Golf:
  - The six-month PGA Tour winning streak of Tiger Woods ends at the CA Championship as he finishes fifth, two shots behind winner Geoff Ogilvy.

== 23 March 2008 (Sunday) ==
- Auto racing:

- Formula One: Malaysian Grand Prix in Sepang, Malaysia

(1) Kimi Räikkönen (Finland) (2) Robert Kubica (Poland) (3) Heikki Kovalainen (Finland)

- Basketball: Upsets at the NCAA Men's Division I Basketball Tournament second round:
  - (10) Davidson 74, (2) Georgetown 70 at Raleigh, North Carolina
  - Also, for only the third time since the tournament field expanded to 64 teams in 1985, two teams seeded 12 or lower make the "Sweet Sixteen". Today, 12-seeds Villanova and Western Kentucky both defeat 13-seeds to advance.

== 22 March 2008 (Saturday) ==
- Basketball: Upsets at the NCAA Men's Division I Basketball Tournament second round:
  - (7) West Virginia 73, (2) Duke 67 at Washington, D.C.
- Cricket
  - Irish cricket team in Bangladesh in 2007–08
    - 3rd ODI-Bangladesh 293/7 (50 ov.) beat Ireland 214 (45.3 ov.) by 79 runs

== 21 March 2008 (Friday) ==
- Basketball: Upsets at the NCAA Men's Division I Basketball Tournament first round:
  - (12) Villanova 75, (5) Clemson 69 at Tampa
  - (13) Siena 83, (4) Vanderbilt 62 at Tampa
  - (13) San Diego 70, (4) Connecticut 69 (OT) at Tampa
  - (12) Western Kentucky 101, (5) Drake 99 (OT) at Tampa
    - These four upsets in the St. Pete Times Forum marked the first time were all higher seeds were eliminated at the first round in one "pod."
  - (10) Davidson 82, (7) Gonzaga 76 at Raleigh
  - By contrast, in North Little Rock, Arkansas, the four games saw no upsets and a total of nine lead changes.
- Swimming: French swimmer Alain Bernard sets a new world record for the men's 100 metres freestyle in 47.60 seconds.

== 20 March 2008 (Thursday) ==
- Basketball:
  - Euroleague Top 16 (teams qualifying for the quarterfinals are in **bold**)
    - Group F: In a winner-take-all showdown in Athens for one of two quarterfinal spots, (Greece) **Olympiacos** defeat (Spain) Real Madrid 72–63. Meanwhile, already-qualified (Israel) Maccabi Tel Aviv win 80–66 at home over (Lithuania) Žalgiris to secure first place in the group. (Euroleague: Olympiacos-Real) (Euroleague: Maccabi-Žalgiris)
    - Group G: (Spain) **AXA FC Barcelona** secure second place in the group with a 64–62 home win over (Russia) CSKA Moscow, which had already clinched first place in the group. (Euroleague)
  - Upsets at the NCAA Men's Division I Basketball Tournament first round:
    - (11) Kansas State 80, (6) USC 67 at Omaha
- Cricket:
  - Irish cricket team in Bangladesh in 2007–08
    - 2nd ODI-Bangladesh 246/8 (50 ov.) beat Ireland 162 (38.3 ov.) by 84 runs

== 19 March 2008 (Wednesday) ==
- Basketball: Euroleague Top 16 (teams qualifying for the quarterfinals are in **bold**)
  - Group D: (Serbia) **Partizan** win a home showdown with defending Euroleague champion (Greece) Panathinaikos 82–73 to join already-qualified (Italy) Montepaschi Siena from the group. (Euroleague)
  - Group E: (Turkey) **Fenerbahçe** defeat (Spain) TAU Cerámica, which had already clinched first place in the group, 75–59 at home to punch their ticket to the quarterfinals. (Euroleague)
- Football (soccer):
  - City of London Police raid the offices of Premiership club Birmingham City as part of an investigation into corruption in English football. A police spokeswoman said the raid was not linked to the recent inquiry into transfers and payments to agents. (BBC)

== 18 March 2008 (Tuesday) ==
- Basketball:
  - The Boston Celtics end the 22-game winning streak of the Houston Rockets, the second-longest in NBA history, with a 94–74 win in Houston.
- Cricket:
  - Irish cricket team in Bangladesh in 2007–08
    - 1st ODI-Bangladesh 186/2 (39.5 ov.) beat Ireland 185/7 (50 ov.) win by 8 wickets

== 17 March 2008 (Monday) ==
- College Basketball:
  - The NCAA selects teams for the brackets for the 2008 NCAA Women's Division I Basketball Tournament. The #1 seeds in the four regions are UConn (Greensboro), North Carolina (New Orleans), Tennessee (Oklahoma City) and Maryland (Spokane).

== 16 March 2008 (Sunday) ==
- Auto racing:

- Formula One: Australian Grand Prix in Albert Park, Victoria

(1) Lewis Hamilton (United Kingdom) (2) Nick Heidfeld (Germany) (3) Nico Rosberg (Germany)

- NASCAR Sprint Cup: Food City 500 in Bristol, Tennessee

(1) Jeff Burton (United States) (2) Kevin Harvick (United States) (3) Clint Bowyer (United States)

Richard Childress Racing sweeps the podium places. Dale Jarrett finishes 37th in the final points race of his career.

- V8 Supercar: Sprint Gas V8 Supercars Manufacturers Challenge in Albert Park, Victoria

(1) Garth Tander (Australia) (2) Will Davison (Australia) (3) Rick Kelly (Australia)

- Basketball:
  - Canadian Interuniversity Sport basketball Final 8 at Scotiabank Place, Ottawa:
    - Men's Final: (7) Brock Badgers 64, (5) Acadia Axemen – The momentum gained from the Axemen up-ending the five-time defending National champions doesn't come through to the final, as Dusty Bianchin puts the game away with 11 seconds to go in the fourth. Brock head coach Ken Murray shares the championship with his son Scott Murray, a fifth-year guard for the Badgers. Brock wins only their second national championship, the first since 1992.
    - Men's Consolation Final: Laval Rouge-et-Or 86, UBC Thunderbirds 84 – UBC's leading scorer, Chris Dyck, falls short on his three-point attempt at the buzzer for the win.
  - U.S. college basketball:
    - Men's conference championship games — winners earn bids to the NCAA tournament (rankings from AP Poll):
      - ACC in Charlotte, North Carolina: (1) North Carolina 86, Clemson 81
      - Southland in Katy, Texas: UT-Arlington 82, Northwestern State 79
      - Big 12 in Kansas City, Missouri: (5) Kansas 84, (6) Texas 74
      - Big Ten in Indianapolis: (8) Wisconsin 61, Illinois 48
      - SEC in Atlanta: Georgia 66, Arkansas 57
    - The NCAA selects teams for the brackets for the 2008 NCAA Men's Division I Basketball Tournament. The #1 seeds in the four regions are North Carolina (Charlotte), Memphis (Houston), UCLA (Phoenix) and Kansas (Detroit).
    - Women's conference championship games — winners earn bids to the NCAA tournament (rankings from AP Poll):
      - CAA in Newark, Delaware: (14) Old Dominion 71, Virginia Commonwealth 64
      - Horizon in Green Bay, Wisconsin: Cleveland State 70, Wright State 56
      - Big South in Asheville, North Carolina: Liberty 66, Radford 65
      - Northeast in Moon Township, Pennsylvania: Robert Morris 86, LIU 75
      - MVC in St. Charles, Missouri: Illinois State 70, Drake 62
      - America East in West Hartford, Connecticut: Hartford 61, Boston University 45
    - Women's regular season game — winner earns a bid to the NCAA Tournament
      - Ivy League playoff final in New York City: Cornell 64, Dartmouth 47
- Golf:
  - Tiger Woods sinks a 25-foot (8 m) birdie putt on the 72nd hole to win the Arnold Palmer Invitational by one shot over Bart Bryant. The win, his fifth in this event, gives him his third PGA Tour win in three tries this season and his fifth PGA Tour win in a row, makes him the first golfer in Tour history to win four different tournaments at least five times, and pulls him level with Ben Hogan at third on the Tour's all-time career wins list.
- Cricket:
  - English cricket team in New Zealand in 2007–08
    - England 342 (107 ov.) & 293 (97.4 ov.) beat New Zealand 198 (57.5 ov.) & 311 (100.3 ov.) by 126 runs

== 15 March 2008 (Saturday) ==
- Auto racing:
  - American Le Mans Series 12 Hours of Sebring

(1) (United States) Penske Racing – Porsche (2) (United States) Dyson Racing – Porsche (3) (United States) Audi Sport North America – Audi

The LMP2 class Porsche defeats the LMP1 Audi, breaking the latter's eight year streak of victories.

- Boxing: "Unfinished Business" card at Mandalay Bay Resort and Casino, Las Vegas, Nevada
  - (Philippines) Manny Pacquiao def. (Mexico) Juan Manuel Márquez via split decision to win the WBC and The Ring world super featherweight title.
  - (United States) Steven Luevano def. (Thailand) Terdsak Jandaeng via unanimous decision to retain the WBO featherweight title.
  - (Mexico) David Díaz def. (United States) Ramon Montano via majority decision on a lightweight bout.
  - (Mexico) Abner Mares def. (Philippines) Diosdado Gabi via a 2nd-round knockout in a bantamweight bout.
- Rugby union: Six Nations – final round of matches.
  - Italy 23–20 Scotland at Stadio Flaminio, Rome
    - A last-second drop goal from Andrea Marcato gives Italy their only win of the competition, although the three-point win is not enough to save the Azzurri from the wooden spoon.
  - England 33–10 Ireland at Twickenham, London
    - England bounce back from last week's embarrassment at Murrayfield. Danny Cipriani, starting at fly-half over Jonny Wilkinson, scores 18 of England's points.
  - Wales 29–12 France at the Millennium Stadium, Cardiff
    - Wales pick up their second Grand Slam in four years. Shane Williams surpasses Gareth Thomas as Wales' all-time leading try scorer.
- U.S. college basketball:
  - Men's conference championship games — winners earn bids to the NCAA tournament (rankings from AP Poll):
    - C-USA in Memphis, Tennessee: (2) Memphis 77, Tulsa 51
    - America East in Baltimore: UMBC 82, Hartford 65
    - Atlantic 10 in Atlantic City, New Jersey: Temple 69, Saint Joseph's 64
    - Pac-10 in Los Angeles: (3) UCLA 67, (11) Stanford 64
    - MAC in Cleveland: Kent State 74, Akron 55
    - MWC in Las Vegas: UNLV 76, (24) BYU 61
    - SWAC in Birmingham, Alabama: Mississippi Valley State 59, Jackson State 58
    - MEAC in Raleigh, North Carolina: Coppin State 62, Morgan State 60
    - Big East in New York City: Pitt 74, (9) Georgetown 65
    - WAC in Las Cruces, New Mexico: Boise State 107, New Mexico State 102 (3 OT)
    - Big West in Anaheim, California: Cal State Fullerton 81, UC Irvine 66
  - Women's conference championship games — winners earn bids to the NCAA tournament (rankings from AP Poll):
    - MAC in Cleveland: Miami (OH) 67, Ohio 56
    - MEAC in Raleigh, North Carolina: Coppin State 72, North Carolina A&T 70
    - WAC in Las Cruces, New Mexico: Fresno State 72, New Mexico State 56
    - Big West in Anaheim, California: UC Santa Barbara 74, UC Davis 59
    - MWC in Las Vegas: New Mexico 62, San Diego State 59
    - Southland in Katy, Texas: UTSA 65, Lamar 56
    - SWAC in Birmingham, Alabama: Jackson State 63, Prairie View 61
    - Big 12 in Kansas City, Missouri: (11) Texas A&M 64, (18) Oklahoma State 59
    - Big Sky in Missoula, Montana: Montana 101, Montana State 65

== 14 March 2008 (Friday) ==
- Basketball:
  - Australian NBL Grand Finals at Sydney Entertainment Centre:
    - Melbourne Tigers 85, Sydney Kings 73, **Melbourne wins series, 3–2.**
  - U.S. college basketball:
    - Men's conference championship games — winners earn bids to the NCAA tournament:
      - Patriot in Washington, D.C.: American 52, Colgate 46
    - The SEC tournament game between Mississippi State and Alabama is delayed for an hour when a tornado hits Downtown Atlanta, causing minor damage to the tournament site, the Georgia Dome. The game resumed, with Mississippi State winning 69–67 in overtime, but forecasts of continued severe weather lead to the postponement of the final second-round game between Kentucky and Georgia. The Kentucky-Georgia game, plus both semifinals, will be played on March 15, and all remaining games will be played at Alexander Memorial Coliseum on the Georgia Tech campus.
  - NBA:
    - The Houston Rockets win their 21st consecutive game, defeating the Charlotte Bobcats 89–80 at home. This gives the Rockets the second-longest winning streak in NBA history, trailing only the 33-game streak of the 1971–72 Los Angeles Lakers. (AP via ESPN)

== 13 March 2008 (Thursday) ==
- Basketball: Euroleague Top 16; teams advancing to the quarterfinals are in **bold**
  - Group D: Although (Italy) **Montepaschi Siena** lose 77–76 to (Greece) Panathinaikos in Athens, their margin of defeat is sufficiently close to give them the tiebreakers they need to advance to the quarterfinals. (Euroleague)
  - Group F: (Israel) **Maccabi Tel Aviv** punch their ticket to the quarterfinals with a 103–100 away win over (Spain) Real Madrid in overtime. (Euroleague)
- Association football: 2008 CONCACAF Men's Pre-Olympic Tournament
  - Final round – Group A
    - United States 1–0 Panama, Freddy Adu scored a penalty in the 42nd minute to win the game for the United States.
    - Honduras 2–0 Cuba, Honduras beat Cuba to go top of Group A. Five Cuban players were reported as having gone missing prior to the match. (NY Times)
- Cricket:
  - South African cricket team in Bangladesh in 2007–08
    - 3rd ODI-South Africa 147/3 (34.2 ov.) beat Bangladesh 143 (42.5 ov.) by 7 wickets
      - **South Africa win the series 3–0**.

== 12 March 2008 (Wednesday) ==
- Basketball:
  - Euroleague:
    - (Russia) CSKA Moscow becomes the second club to secure a quarterfinal berth, crushing (Spain) Unicaja Málaga 93–70 at home in Top 16 Group G action. (Euroleague)
  - U.S. college:
    - Men's conference championship games — winners earn bids to the NCAA tournament:
      - NEC in Fairfield, Connecticut: Mount St. Mary's 68,. Sacred Heart 55
      - Big Sky in Portland, Oregon: Portland State 67, Northern Arizona 51
    - Women's conference championship games — winners earn bids to the NCAA tournament:
      - Patriot in Worcester, Massachusetts: Bucknell 57, Holy Cross 45
- Women's association football:
  - 2008 Algarve Cup
    - The USA won the Algarve Cup for the sixth time with goals from Natasha Kai and Abby Wambach.
    - Final: Denmark 1 – 2 United States
    - 3rd place: Germany 0 – 2 Norway
    - 5th place: Sweden 3 – 0 Italy
    - 7th place: Finland 0 – 3 Iceland
    - 9th place: China 1 – 1 Portugal
      - China won the resulting penalty shoot-out 5–4
    - 11th place: Republic of Ireland 2 – 2 Poland
      - Poland won the resulting penalty shoot-out 5–6
- Cricket:
  - South African cricket team in Bangladesh in 2007–08
    - 2nd ODI-South Africa 179/3 (48.1 ov.) beat South Africa 173 (48.2 ov.) by 7 wickets

== 11 March 2008 (Tuesday) ==
- U.S. college basketball:
  - Men's conference championship games — winners earn bids to the NCAA tournament (rankings from AP Poll):
    - The Summit in Tulsa, Oklahoma: Oral Roberts 71, IUPUI 64
    - Horizon in Indianapolis: (12) Butler 70, Cleveland State 55
    - Sun Belt in Mobile, Alabama: Western Kentucky 67, Middle Tennessee 57
  - Women's conference championship games — winners earn bids to the NCAA tournament (rankings from AP Poll):
    - The Summit in Tulsa, Oklahoma: Oral Roberts 66, IUPUI 53
    - Sun Belt in Mobile, Alabama: Western Kentucky 65, Middle Tennessee 49
    - Big East in Hartford, Connecticut: (1) UConn 65, Louisville 59

== 10 March 2008 (Monday) ==
- U.S. college basketball:
  - Men's conference championship games — winners earn bids to the NCAA tournament (rankings from AP Poll):
    - CAA in Richmond, Virginia: George Mason 69, William & Mary 58
    - MAAC in Albany, New York: Siena 74, Rider 53
    - SoCon in North Charleston, South Carolina: (23) Davidson 65, Elon 49
    - WCC in San Diego: San Diego 69, (20) Gonzaga 62
  - Women's conference championship games — winners earn bids to the NCAA tournament (rankings from AP Poll):
    - A10 in Philadelphia: Xavier 47, Temple 42
    - SoCon in North Charleston, South Carolina: Chattanooga 71, Western Carolina 59
    - Pac-10 in San Jose, California: (4) Stanford 56, (8) Cal 35

== 9 March 2008 (Sunday) ==
- Association football: 2007–08 FA Cup
  - An astonishing set of results in the Sixth Round this weekend has resulted in a completely different set of teams in the semi-finals from the previous year for the first time since 1987, with the elimination of the last two of the Premiership's "Big 4" teams. For the first time in a century only one of the four semi-final teams comes from the highest level of professional English football, currently the Premiership.
    - Portsmouth defeated fellow Premiership side Manchester United 1 – 0 at Old Trafford.
    - Championship side Barnsley, who last reached the semi-finals in 1912 when they went on to win the competition, defeated holders Chelsea 1 – 0 at Oakwell.
    - Championship side Cardiff City, cup winners in 1927, defeated Premiership side Middlesbrough 0 – 2 at Middlesbrough's Riverside Stadium.
    - Championship side West Bromwich Albion not unexpectedly defeated League One side Bristol Rovers 1 – 5 at Rovers' Memorial Stadium.
- Rugby union: Six Nations
  - France 25 – 13 Italy at Stade de France, Saint-Denis
    - France will need to beat Wales by at least 20 points in next week's final match if they are to win the Championship this year.
- Cricket:
  - South African cricket team in Bangladesh in 2007–08
    - 1st ODI-South Africa 180/1 (36.5 ov.) beat Bangladesh 178 (48.2 ov.) by 9 wickets
  - English cricket team in New Zealand in 2007–08
    - 1st Test-New Zealand 470 (138.3 ov.) & 177/9 (dec) (55 ov.) beat England 348 (173.1 ov.) & 110 (55 ov.) by 189 runs
- Auto racing:
  - NASCAR Sprint Cup Kobalt Tools 500 in Hampton, Georgia

(1) Kyle Busch (2) Tony Stewart (3) Dale Earnhardt Jr.

Busch's win is also the first for Toyota in NASCAR's top series.

  - 2008 V8 Supercar season: Round 2, at Eastern Creek Raceway, New South Wales, Australia:
  (1) Will Davison (Australia) (2) Mark Winterbottom (Australia) (3) Garth Tander (Australia)
- Motorcycle racing:
  - Moto GP F.I.M. Road Racing World Championship: Qatar motorcycle Grand Prix, at Losail International Circuit in Doha, Qatar.
  (1) Casey Stoner (Australia) (2) Jorge Lorenzo (Spain) (3) Dani Pedrosa (Spain)
- U.S. college basketball:
  - Men's conference championship games — winners earn bids to the NCAA tournament (rankings from AP Poll):
    - MVC in St. Louis: (20) Drake 79, Illinois State 49
  - Women's conference championship games — winners earn bids to the NCAA tournament (rankings from AP Poll):
    - MAAC in Albany, New York: (24) Marist 83, Iona 63
    - ACC in Greensboro, North Carolina: (2) North Carolina 86, (12) Duke 73
    - C-USA in Orlando, Florida: SMU 73, (18) UTEP 57
    - WCC in San Diego: San Diego 70, Gonzaga 66
    - Big Ten in Indianapolis: Purdue 58, Illinois 56
    - SEC in Nashville: (3) Tennessee 61, (7) LSU 55

== 8 March 2008 (Saturday) ==
- Rugby union: Six Nations
  - Ireland 12 – 16 Wales at Croke Park, Dublin
    - Wales secure the Triple Crown in a hard-fought match, and turn next week's match against France into a Grand Slam decider.
  - Scotland 15 – 9 England at Murrayfield, Edinburgh
    - England surrender the Calcutta Cup abjectly in a shockingly poor performance at the home of Scottish rugby. England fly-half Jonny Wilkinson becomes the all-time leading point scorer in Test rugby history, surpassing Wales' Neil Jenkins.
- U.S. college basketball:
  - Men's conference championship games — winners earn bids to the NCAA tournament
    - Atlantic Sun in Nashville: Belmont 79, Jacksonville 61
    - Big South in Asheville, North Carolina: Winthrop 66, UNC-Asheville 48
    - OVC in Nashville: Austin Peay 82, Tennessee State 64
  - Women's conference championship games — winners earn bids to the NCAA tournament
    - Atlantic Sun in Nashville: East Tennessee State 75, Jacksonville 72
    - OVC in Nashville: Murray State 69, Eastern Illinois 58
  - Other key men's games (rankings from AP Poll):
    - (1) North Carolina 78, (5) Duke 69
      - The Tar Heels avenge an earlier home loss to the Blue Devils, holding Duke scoreless for the last 5:42 to win the ACC regular-season title in front of Duke's Cameron Crazies.
    - (11) Georgetown 55, (12) Louisville 52
      - The Hoyas hold on for a home win, securing the Big East regular-season crown.
  - Other key women's games:
    - Harvard's 64–58 loss to Yale, Dartmouth's 51–48 win over Brown, and Cornell's 76–59 win over Princeton leave Harvard, Dartmouth, and Cornell tied atop the Ivy League, the only conference that does not conduct a postseason tournament. The three teams will play a series of two one-game playoffs on March 14 and 16 at Columbia to determine the league's automatic NCAA tournament bid.

== 5 March 2008 (Wednesday) ==
- Basketball:
  - Euroleague: (Spain) TAU Cerámica becomes the first club to clinch a spot in the quarterfinals, winning 87–84 at home over (Lithuania) Lietuvos Rytas Vilnius in Top 16 Group E action. (Euroleague)

== 4 March 2008 (Tuesday) ==
- National Football League:
  - Green Bay Packers quarterback Brett Favre, the league's all-time record holder for career passing yardage, career touchdown passes, career wins by a quarterback, and consecutive starts by a quarterback, announces his retirement. (ESPN)
- Cricket:
  - 2007–08 Commonwealth Bank Series
    - 2nd Final-India 258/9 (50 ov.) beat Australia 249 (49.4 ov.) by 9 runs

== 3 March 2008 (Monday) ==
- Cricket:
  - South African cricket team in Bangladesh in 2007–08
    - 2nd Test-South Africa 583/7(dec) (161.1 ov.) beat Bangladesh 259 (70.4 ov.) & 119 (39.5 ov.) by an innings and 205 runs

== 2 March 2008 (Sunday) ==
- Auto racing:
  - NASCAR Sprint Cup UAW-Dodge 400 in Las Vegas
  (1) Carl Edwards, (2) Dale Earnhardt Jr., (3) Greg Biffle
  - World Rally Championship: 22º Corona Rally México, in Mexico:
  (1) Sébastien Loeb (France) (2) Chris Atkinson (Australia) (3) Jari-Matti Latvala (Finland)
- Basketball
  - Philippine Basketball Association, Philippine Cup Finals:
    - Sta. Lucia Realtors 100, Purefoods Tender Juicy Giants 88, **Sta. Lucia wins series, 4–3.**
      - The Realtors clinch their first Philippine Cup and second title overall.
- Cricket
  - 2008 U/19 Cricket World Cup
    - Finals-India U-19 159 (45.4 ov.) beat South Africa U-19 103/8 (25 ov.) by 12 runs (D/L)
  - 2007–08 Commonwealth Bank Series
    - 1st Final-India 242/4 (45.5 ov.) beat Australia 239/8 (50 ov.) by 6 wickets
- Motorcycle racing:
  - Superbike: Phillip Island Superbike World Championship round, at Phillip Island Grand Prix Circuit, Australia:
  Race 1(1) Troy Bayliss (Australia) (2) Troy Corser (Australia) (3) Michel Fabrizio (Italy)
  Race 2(1) Troy Bayliss (Australia) (2) Carlos Checa (Spain) (3) Fonsi Nieto (Spain)

== 1 March 2008 (Saturday) ==
- U.S. college basketball:
  - Cornell clinches the Ivy League title with an 86–53 home win over Harvard. As the Ivy League is the only NCAA Division I conference that does not hold a postseason tournament, the Big Red becomes the first team to secure a bid to the 2008 NCAA men's tournament.
  - Duke comes back from a 13-point second-half deficit to defeat NC State 87–86 in Raleigh, giving Mike Krzyzewski his 800th career coaching win. He becomes the sixth Division I men's coach with 800 wins, with only Adolph Rupp and Dean Smith doing so in fewer games.
  - Other key games (rankings from AP Poll):
    - Texas Tech 83, (5) Texas 80
    - (8) Stanford 60, (22) Washington State 53
    - (11) Georgetown 70, (21) Marquette 68 (OT)
    - (24) Gonzaga 88, (25) Saint Mary's 76
