= April 2008 in sports =

| << | April 2008 | | | | | >> |
| Su | Mo | Tu | We | Th | Fr | Sa |
| | | 1 | 2 | 3 | 4 | 5 |
| 6 | 7 | 8 | 9 | 10 | 11 | 12 |
| 13 | 14 | 15 | 16 | 17 | 18 | 19 |
| 20 | 21 | 22 | 23 | 24 | 25 | 26 |
| 27 | 28 | 29 | 30 |
Sports

This list shows notable sports-related deaths, events, and notable outcomes that occurred in April of 2008.

== Deaths ==
- 28: Will Robinson
- 25: John H. McConnell
- 19: Constant Vanden Stock

== Current sporting seasons ==
- Australian rules football:
  - AFL
- Auto racing 2008:
  - Formula 1
  - Sprint Cup
  - Nationwide
  - Craftsman Truck
  - World Rally Championship
  - IndyCar Series
  - American Le Mans
  - GP2
  - Le Mans Series
  - Rolex Sports Car
  - FIA GT
  - WTCC
- Baseball 2008:
  - Nippon Professional Baseball
  - Major League Baseball
- Basketball 2008:
  - National Basketball Association
  - Euroleague
  - Philippine Basketball Association
  - Russian Basketball Super League
  - Turkish Basketball League
- Cricket 2008:
  - Indian Premier League
- Cycling
  - UCI ProTour
- Football (soccer) 2007–08:
  - Argentina
  - Denmark
  - England
  - Ecuador
  - France
  - Germany
  - Italy
  - Spain
  - UEFA Champions League
  - UEFA Cup
- Football (soccer) 2008:
  - Brazil
  - Japan
  - MLS
  - Norway
- Golf 2008:
  - PGA Tour
  - European Tour
  - LPGA Tour
- Ice hockey 2007–08
  - National Hockey League
- Lacrosse 2008
  - National Lacrosse League
- Motorcycle racing 2008:
  - Moto GP
  - Superbike
- Rugby league
  - Super League
  - NRL
- Rugby union 2007–08:
  - Super 14
  - IRB Sevens
  - Heineken Cup
  - English Premiership
  - Celtic League
  - Top 14

== 30 April 2008 (Wednesday) ==
- Association football: UEFA Champions League semifinals, second leg
  - Chelsea (England) 3–2 (England) Liverpool (aet): Chelsea win 4–3 on aggregate
    - In a tense second leg at Stamford Bridge, Liverpool's Fernando Torres sends the tie into extra time with a late goal. A Frank Lampard penalty and Didier Drogba's second goal of the night give Chelsea breathing room, and they hold on to book their trip to Moscow to take on Manchester United.
- National Basketball Association
  - The Dallas Mavericks fire head coach Avery Johnson, who tallied a 194–70 regular-season record over three full years but lost in the first round of the playoffs the last two years. (AP via Yahoo)
- National Hockey League
  - The New York Rangers announce forward Sean Avery has been hospitalized with a lacerated spleen and will miss the rest of the playoffs. The team denies a New York Daily News report that Avery suffered cardiac arrest. (AP via Yahoo)
- College football
  - The Bowl Championship Series announces the system will retain its current format through at least 2014. (AP via Yahoo)

== 29 April 2008 (Tuesday) ==
- Association football: UEFA Champions League semifinals, second leg
  - Manchester United (England) 1–0 (Spain) Barcelona: Man United win 1–0 on aggregate
    - Paul Scholes scores the only goal of the match in the 14th minute, and United hold on to book a place in the final.
- National Basketball Association
  - The Charlotte Bobcats hire Larry Brown as head coach. Brown previously coached eight other NBA teams. (AP via Yahoo)
  - NBA Playoffs-First Round:
    - Western Conference First Round:
      - New Orleans Hornets 99, Dallas Mavericks 94, New Orleans wins series 4–1
      - San Antonio Spurs 92, Phoenix Suns 87, San Antonio wins series 4–1
- Rugby union: 2008 IRB Junior World Rugby Trophy in Chile
  - Final: Chile 8–20 Uruguay

== 28 April 2008 (Monday) ==
- Basketball – NBA Playoffs-First Round:
  - Eastern Conference First Round:
    - Orlando Magic 102, Toronto Raptors 92, Orlando wins series 4–1
  - Western Conference First Round:
    - Los Angeles Lakers 107, Denver Nuggets 101, L.A. Lakers wins series 4–0

== 27 April 2008 (Sunday) ==
- Baseball:
  - Cleveland Indians center fielder Grady Sizemore sits out Cleveland's 1–0 loss to the New York Yankees with a sore ankle. Sizemore's streak of consecutive games played, which had been the longest in the Major Leagues, ends at 382. Jeff Francoeur of the Atlanta Braves now has the longest active streak at 351 games. (Canton Repository)
- National Football League
  - 2008 NFL draft Day 2 notable picks:

65. Detroit Lions: Running back Kevin Smith, UCF
73. Kansas City Chiefs (from Denver through Minnesota): Running back Jamaal Charles, Texas
81. Arizona Cardinals: Wide receiver Early Doucet, LSU
86. Baltimore Ravens (from Seattle): Free safety Tom Zbikowski, Notre Dame
89. Houston Texans (from Jacksonville through Baltimore): Running back Steve Slaton, West Virginia
95. New York Giants: Wide receiver Mario Manningham, Michigan
137. Minnesota Vikings (from St. Louis through Green Bay): Quarterback John David Booty, USC
156. Pittsburgh Steelers: Quarterback Dennis Dixon, Oregon
162. New York Jets (from Green Bay): Quarterback Erik Ainge, Tennessee
186. Washington Redskins: Quarterback Colt Brennan, Hawaii
202. Indianapolis Colts: Running back Mike Hart, Michigan
209. Green Bay Packers (From St. Louis through Minnesota): Quarterback Matt Flynn, LSU
252 (Mr. Irrelevant). St. Louis Rams: Linebacker David Vobora, Idaho

- Auto racing:
  - Formula One: Spanish Grand Prix in Barcelona, Spain

(1) Kimi Räikkönen (Finland) (2) Felipe Massa (Brazil) (3) Lewis Hamilton (United Kingdom)

  - Indy Racing League: RoadRunner Turbo Indy 300 in Kansas City, Kansas

(1) Dan Wheldon (United Kingdom) (2) Tony Kanaan (Brazil) (3) Scott Dixon (New Zealand)

  - Le Mans Series: 1000km of Monza in Autodromo Nazionale Monza, Italy

(1) Pedro Lamy (Portugal) & Stéphane Sarrazin (France) (2) Alexandre Prémat (France) & Mike Rockenfeller (Germany) (3) Harald Primat (Switzerland) & Christophe Tinseau (France)

  - NASCAR Sprint Cup: Aaron's 499 in Talladega, Alabama

(1) Kyle Busch (Nevada) (2) Juan Pablo Montoya (Colombia) (3) Denny Hamlin (Virginia)

  - World Rally Championship: Jordan Rally in Amman, Jordan

(1) Mikko Hirvonen (Finland) (2) Dani Sordo (Spain) (3) Chris Atkinson (Australia)

- Motorcycle racing:
  - Superbike: Assen Superbike World Championship round, at TT Circuit Assen, Netherlands:
  Race 1 (1) Troy Bayliss (Australia) (2) Carlos Checa (Spain) (3) Max Neukirchner (Germany)
  Race 2 (1) Troy Bayliss (Australia) (2) Noriyuki Haga (Japan) (3) Carlos Checa (Spain)
- Rugby union: Heineken Cup semifinals
  - Saracens (England) 16–18 (Ireland) Munster at Ricoh Arena, Coventry

== 26 April 2008 (Saturday) ==
- Association football: English Premier League
  - Chelsea 2–1 Manchester United
    - Chelsea's win at home brought them level with Manchester United on points at the top of the league table with two matches to go.
- Basketball:
  - FIBA, the sport's international governing body, announces major rules changes, set to take effect for major international competitions in late 2010 and other competitions in late 2012, which will result in its court markings being much more similar to those of the NBA. These changes are: (FIBA)
    - FIBA will scrap its trapezoidal restricted area (free-throw lane) and adopt a rectangular area with the same dimensions as currently used by the NBA.
    - The three-point line will move to 6.75 m (22 ft 2 in) from the center of the basket, compared with the current 6.25 m (20 ft 6 in).
    - FIBA will adopt the "no-charge semicircle" currently used in the NBA, by which an offensive player cannot be called for charging if the defensive player is within this semicircle near the defender's basket.
  - NBA:
    - Michael Jordan and the Charlotte Bobcats fire head coach Sam Vincent. They replace him with Larry Brown, who sets an NBA record by taking the helm of his ninth team. (AP via Yahoo)
- Rugby union: Heineken Cup semifinals
  - London Irish (England) 15–21 (France) Toulouse at Twickenham, London
- National Football League:
  - 2008 NFL draft:
    - Top picks:
      1. Miami Dolphins: Offensive tackle Jake Long, Michigan
      2. St. Louis Rams: Defensive end Chris Long, Virginia
      3. Atlanta Falcons: Quarterback Matt Ryan, Boston College
      4. Oakland Raiders: Running back Darren McFadden, Arkansas
      5. Kansas City Chiefs: Defensive tackle Glenn Dorsey, LSU
      6. New York Jets: Defensive end Vernon Gholston, Ohio State
      7. New Orleans Saints (from San Francisco via New England): Defensive tackle Sedrick Ellis, USC
      8. Jacksonville Jaguars (from Baltimore): Defensive end Derrick Harvey, Florida
      9. Cincinnati Bengals: Linebacker Keith Rivers, USC
      10. New England Patriots (from New Orleans): Linebacker Jerod Mayo, Tennessee
    - Other notables:

13. Carolina Panthers: Running back Jonathan Stewart, Oregon
18. Baltimore Ravens: Quarterback Joe Flacco, Delaware
55. Baltimore (from Seattle): Running back Ray Rice, Rutgers
56. Green Bay Packers (from Cleveland): Quarterback Brian Brohm, (Louisville)
57. Miami (from San Diego): Quarterback Chad Henne, Michigan

== 22 April 2008 (Tuesday) ==
- NBA:
  - Kevin Garnett of the Boston Celtics is named Defensive Player of the Year.
- National Football League:
  - 2008 NFL draft:
    - Four days before the formal start of the draft, the Miami Dolphins, who hold the No. 1 pick, sign Michigan offensive tackle Jake Long to a five-year contract. The St. Louis Rams, who have the No. 2 pick, are now "on the clock." (AP via Yahoo)
  - The Seattle Seahawks release former MVP Shaun Alexander. (AP via Yahoo)
- NHL
  - 2008 Stanley Cup playoffs
    - Eastern Conference Quarterfinals
      - Philadelphia Flyers 3, Washington Capitals 2, OT, Philadelphia wins series 4–3
    - Western Conference Quarterfinals
      - San Jose Sharks 5, Calgary Flames 3, San Jose wins series 4–3

== 21 April 2008 (Monday) ==
- Boston Marathon:
  - Kenya's Robert Kipkoech Cheruiyot wins the men's event for the fourth time, with a time of 2:07:46.
  - Dire Tune of Ethiopia wins the women's race in 2:25:25.
- NHL
  - 2008 Stanley Cup playoffs
    - Eastern Conference Quarterfinals
      - Montreal Canadiens 5, Boston Bruins 0, Montreal wins series 4–3
- Major League Baseball
  - Chase Utley of the Philadelphia Phillies hits a home run in his fifth consecutive game, a 9–5 victory over the Colorado Rockies.
- NBA:
  - Manu Ginóbili of the San Antonio Spurs receives the Sixth Man Award.

== 20 April 2008 (Sunday) ==
- Auto racing:
  - American Le Mans Series: Long Beach Grand Prix on the streets of Long Beach, California

(1) Marco Werner (Germany) & Lucas Luhr (Germany) (2) Frank Biela (Germany) & Emanuele Pirro (Italy) (3) Scott Sharp (United States) & David Brabham (Australia)

  - Deutsche Tourenwagen Masters: Round 2 at Oschersleben, Germany

(1) Timo Scheider (Germany) (2) Martin Tomczyk (Germany) (3) Bruno Spengler (Canada)

  - FIA GT Championship: RAC Tourist Trophy in Silverstone, Great Britain

(1) Karl Wendlinger (Austria) & Ryan Sharp (United Kingdom) (2) Michael Bartels (Germany) & Andrea Bertolini (Italy) (3) Philipp Peter (Austria) & Allan Simonsen (Denmark)

  - Indy Racing League: Indy Japan 300 in Motegi, Japan

(1) Danica Patrick (United States) (2) Hélio Castroneves (Brazil) (3) Scott Dixon (New Zealand)

Danica Patrick becomes the first woman to win a race in a top-flight American motor racing series.

  - Indy Racing League: Long Beach Grand Prix on the streets of Long Beach, California

(1) Will Power (Australia) (2) Franck Montagny (France) (3) Mario Domínguez (Mexico)

Will Power claims his debut IRL victory, winning the last ever Champ Car race after 28 seasons of Champ Car racing.

  - V8 Supercar: Hamilton 400, at Hamilton Street Circuit, New Zealand:

(1) Garth Tander (Australia) (2) Steven Richards (New Zealand) (3) James Courtney (Australia)

- NHL
  - 2008 Stanley Cup playoffs
    - Western Conference Quarterfinals
      - Detroit Red Wings 3, Nashville Predators 0, Detroit wins series 4–2
      - Dallas Stars 4, Anaheim Ducks 1, Dallas wins series 4–2

== 19 April 2008 (Saturday) ==
- Auto racing:
  - Indy Racing League: Indy Japan 300 in Motegi, Japan

Rain, and rain water seeping through the track forced officials to delay the race until April 20.

- Cricket:
  - Bangladesh cricket team in Pakistan in 2008
    - 5th ODI-Pakistan 329/9 (50 ov.) beat Bangladesh 179 (40.5 ov.) by 150 runs
- NHL
  - 2008 Stanley Cup playoffs
    - Western Conference Quarterfinals
      - Colorado Avalanche 2, Minnesota Wild 1, Colorado wins series 4–2

== 18 April 2008 (Friday) ==
- Basketball:
  - NBA team owners vote 28–2 in favor of allowing the Seattle SuperSonics to move to Oklahoma City. Although the team could potentially move for the 2008–09 season, the move is contingent on the settlement of a lawsuit filed by the city of Seattle in an attempt to force the team to honor its lease at KeyArena, which does not expire until 2010. It may also hinge on a potential breach-of-contract lawsuit by former owner Howard Schultz to reclaim the franchise.
- NHL
  - 2008 Stanley Cup playoffs
    - Eastern Conference Quarterfinals
      - New York Rangers 5, New Jersey Devils 3, New York wins series 4–1

== 17 April 2008 (Thursday) ==
- National Football League:
  - Baltimore Ravens quarterback Steve McNair, best known for his decade-long tenure with the Tennessee Titans, announces his retirement.

== 16 April 2008 (Wednesday) ==
- Association football:
  - Scottish Premier League 2007–08
    - Old Firm derby: Celtic 2 – 1 Rangers at Celtic Park
- NHL
  - 2008 Stanley Cup playoffs
    - Eastern Conference Quarterfinals
      - Pittsburgh Penguins 3, Ottawa Senators 1, Pittsburgh wins series 4–0

== 13 April 2008 (Sunday) ==
- Auto racing:
  - Deutsche Tourenwagen Masters: Round 1 at Hockenheimring, Germany

(1) Mattias Ekström (Sweden) (2) Timo Scheider (Germany) (3) Tom Kristensen (Denmark)

  - NASCAR Sprint Cup: Subway Fresh Fit 500 in Avondale, Arizona

(1) Jimmie Johnson (California) (2) Clint Bowyer (Kansas) (3) Denny Hamlin (Virginia)

- Cricket
  - South African cricket team in India in 2007-08
    - 3rd Test-India 325 (99.4 ov.) & 64/2 (13.1 ov.) beat South Africa 265 (87.3 ov.) & 121 (55.5 ov.) by 8 wickets
      - Series tied at 1–1.
  - Bangladesh cricket team in Pakistan in 2008
    - 3rd ODI-Pakistan 308/8 (50 ov.) beat Bangladesh 285/7 (50 ov.) by 23 runs
- Cycling
  - UCI ProTour: Paris–Roubaix in France
    - (1) Tom Boonen (Belgium) (2) Fabian Cancellara (Switzerland) (3) Alessandro Ballan (Italy)
- Golf:
  - South African Trevor Immelman wins The Masters, his first major, by three shots over Tiger Woods.
  - LPGA: Lorena Ochoa wins the Corona Championship in her home country of Mexico by 11 strokes, in the process qualifying for the World Golf Hall of Fame, though she cannot be inducted until 2012.
- Motorcycle racing:
  - Moto GP F.I.M. Road Racing World Championship: Portuguese motorcycle Grand Prix, at Autódromo do Estoril in Estoril, Portugal.
  (1) Jorge Lorenzo (Spain) (2) Dani Pedrosa (Spain) (3) Valentino Rossi (Italy)

Lorenzo becomes the youngest ever winner in 500cc/MotoGP.

== 12 April 2008 (Saturday) ==
- Cricket
  - Sri Lankan cricket team in West Indies in 2007-08
    - 2nd ODI-West Indies 125/3 (20.3/25 ov.) beat Sri Lanka 112/5 (30.3 ov.) by 7 wickets(D/L)
- Ice hockey
  - 2008 NCAA Men's Division I Ice Hockey Tournament — National Championship in Denver
    - Boston College defeats Notre Dame 4–1 to claim their third national title.
- Rugby union
  - EDF Energy Cup Final at Twickenham, London
    - The (Wales) Ospreys claim the first major trophy of the Northern Hemisphere season with a 23–6 win over (England) Leicester Tigers.

== 11 April 2008 (Friday) ==
- Cricket:
  - Bangladesh cricket team in Pakistan in 2008
    - Pakistan 160/3 (23.2 ov.) beat Bangladesh 225/8 (48.2 ov.) by 7 wickets(D/L)
- Free-diving: (New Zealand) William Trubridge set a new world record in Free Immersion with a dive depth of 108m and a dive time of 3:51. Aida International

== 10 April 2008 (Thursday) ==
- Basketball: Euroleague quarterfinals, Game 3 (best-of three)
  - Maccabi Tel Aviv (Israel) 88–75 (Spain) AXA FC Barcelona — Maccabi win series 2–1
- Free-diving: (New Zealand) William Trubridge set a new world record in constant weight no fins with a dive depth of 86m and a dive time of 3:20. Aida International
- Cricket:
  - Sri Lankan cricket team in West Indies in 2007-08
    - 1st ODI-West Indies 236/9 (50 ov.) beat Sri Lanka 235/7 (50 ov.) by 1 wicket

== 9 April 2008 (Wednesday) ==
- Basketball: Euroleague quarterfinals, Game 3 (best-of three)
  - TAU Cerámica (Spain) 85–68 (Serbia) Partizan — TAU win series 2–1
  - CSKA Moscow (Russia) 81–56 (Greece) Olympiacos — CSKA win series 2–1

== 8 April 2008 (Tuesday) ==
- Association football:
  - UEFA Champions League Quarter-finals second leg
    - (England) Liverpool F.C. 4 – 2 (England) Arsenal F.C.
    - (England) Chelsea F.C. 2 – 0 (Turkey) Fenerbahçe SK
- Basketball:
  - 2008 NCAA Women's Division I Basketball Tournament championship game in Tampa:
    - Tennessee 64, Stanford 48
- Cricket:
  - Bangladesh cricket team in Pakistan in 2008
    - Pakistan 322/5 (50 ov.) beat Bangladesh 129 (29.5 ov.) by 152 runs(D/L)

== 7 April 2008 (Monday) ==
- Basketball:
  - 2008 NCAA Men's Division I Basketball Tournament championship game in San Antonio:
    - Kansas 75, Memphis 68 (OT):
      - Kansas wins its third official national championship. The Jayhawks lead at halftime, using their size to score consistently in the paint. Memphis stays close on the outside shooting of Chris Douglas-Roberts, then goes ahead by nine with 2:12 remaining after Derrick Rose gets a hot hand. But the Tigers' old Achilles' heel, poor free throw shooting, comes back to hurt them at the worst possible time, allowing Kansas to claw back within three in the final seconds. Mario Chalmers' 20-footer with 2 seconds left sends the game into an extra period. Overtime is all Jayhawks, with Memphis hitting only one of eight shots.
  - The Naismith Memorial Basketball Hall of Fame announces the Class of 2008: former players Hakeem Olajuwon, Patrick Ewing and Adrian Dantley; coach Pat Riley; pioneering women's college basketball coach Cathy Rush; broadcaster Dick Vitale; and Detroit Pistons owner William Davidson. (AP via Yahoo)

== 6 April 2008 (Sunday) ==
- Association football: FA Cup Semifinal in London
  - Cardiff City 1–0 Barnsley
- Auto racing:
  - Formula One: Bahrain Grand Prix in Bahrain International Circuit, Bahrain

(1) Felipe Massa (Brazil) (2) Kimi Räikkönen (Finland) (3) Robert Kubica (Poland)

  - NASCAR Sprint Cup: Samsung 500 in Fort Worth, Texas

(1) Carl Edwards (Missouri) (2) Jimmie Johnson (California) (3) Kyle Busch (Nevada)

  - Indy Racing League: Honda Grand Prix of St. Petersburg in St. Petersburg, Florida

(1) Graham Rahal (United States) (2) Hélio Castroneves (Brazil) (3) Tony Kanaan (Brazil)

  - Le Mans Series: 1000km of Catalunya in Circuit de Catalunya, Spain

(1) Nicolas Minassian (France) & Marc Gené (Spain) (2) Alexandre Prémat (France) & Mike Rockenfeller (Germany) (3) Jan Charouz (Czech Republic) & Stefan Mücke (Germany)

- Basketball: NCAA women's tournament Final Four in Tampa, Florida
  - Stanford 82, Connecticut 73
  - Tennessee 47, LSU 46
- Cricket
  - Sri Lankan cricket team in West Indies in 2007-08
    - 2nd Test-West Indies 294 (76.2 ov.) & 254/4 (68.3 ov.) beat Sri Lanka 278 (64.5 ov.) & 268 (75.1 ov.) by 6 wickets
- Cycling:
  - UCI ProTour: Tour of Flanders in Belgium

(1) Stijn Devolder (Belgium) (2) Nick Nuyens (Belgium) (3) Juan Antonio Flecha (Spain)

- Golf
  - Lorena Ochoa wins her second consecutive major championship, easing to a five-shot victory over Suzann Pettersen and Annika Sörenstam in the Kraft Nabisco Championship.
- Motorcycle racing:
  - Superbike: Valencia Superbike World Championship round, at Circuit de Valencia, Spain:
  Race 1 (1) Lorenzo Lanzi (Italy) (2) Troy Bayliss (Australia) (3) Troy Corser (Australia)
  Race 2 (1) Noriyuki Haga (Japan) (2) Troy Bayliss (Australia) (3) Carlos Checa (Spain)
- Rugby union: Heineken Cup quarterfinals
  - Saracens (England) 19–10 (Wales) Ospreys at Vicarage Road, Watford
  - Toulouse (France) 41–17 (Wales) Cardiff Blues at Stadium Municipal, Toulouse

== 5 April 2008 (Saturday) ==
- Association football: FA Cup Semifinal in London
  - Portsmouth 1–0 West Bromwich Albion
- Basketball: NCAA men's tournament Final Four in San Antonio
  - Memphis 78, UCLA 63
    - Memphis sets an NCAA record with its 38th win of the season. The Tigers establish a quick pace early and maintain it by keeping fresh legs on the floor. Guards Chris Douglas-Roberts and Derrick Rose score 28 and 25 points, respectively. Memphis' frontcourt defense keeps the ball out of Kevin Love's hands; the Bruins' star freshman accounts for only four field goals and 12 points. The Tigers put the game away at the foul line, hitting 20 of 23 free throws.
  - Kansas 84, North Carolina 66
    - In a game of extreme momentum swings, Tar Heels coach Roy Williams loses to his former school. UNC opens extremely sloppily, committing 10 first-half turnovers and falling behind by 28 at one point. Kansas returns the favor, and North Carolina slowly crawls within four. But the Jayhawks pull away late behind guard Brandon Rush, who finishes with 25 points. Tyler Hansbrough, faced with extremely tight defense from Kansas' deep frontcourt, has a modest 17 points.
- Cricket
  - South African cricket team in India in 2007-08
    - 2nd Test-South Africa 494/7(dec) (141.2 ov.) beat India 76 (20 ov.) & 328 (94.2 ov.) by an innings and 90 runs
- Horse racing: Grand National
  - (Republic of Ireland) Comply or Die wins the 2008 Grand National.
- Rugby union: Heineken Cup quarterfinals
  - London Irish (England) 20–9 (France) Perpignan at Madejski Stadium, Reading
  - Gloucester (England) 3–16 (Ireland) Munster at Kingsholm, Gloucester

== 4 April 2008 (Friday) ==
- Free-diving: (New Zealand) William Trubridge set a new world record in constant weight no fins with a dive depth of 84m and a dive time of 3:20. Aida International

== 3 April 2008 (Thursday) ==
- Basketball: Euroleague quarterfinals, Game 2 (best-of three)
  - Fenerbahçe (Turkey) 65–86 (Italy) Montepaschi Siena; Montepaschi win series 2–0
  - Partizan (Serbia) 76–55 (Spain) TAU Cerámica; series even 1–1
  - AXA FC Barcelona (Spain) 83–74 (Israel) Maccabi Tel Aviv; series even 1–1
  - Olympiacos (Greece) 73–83 (Russia) CSKA Moscow; series even 1–1

== 1 April 2008 (Tuesday) ==
- Basketball: Euroleague quarterfinals, Game 1 (best-of three)
  - Montepaschi Siena (Italy) 73–66 (Turkey) Fenerbahçe (Montepaschi lead 1–0)
  - TAU Cerámica (Spain) 74–66 (Serbia) Partizan (TAU lead 1–0)
  - Maccabi Tel Aviv (Israel) 81–75 (Spain) AXA FC Barcelona (Maccabi lead 1–0)
  - CSKA Moscow (Russia) 74–76 (Greece) Olympiacos (Olympiacos lead 1–0)
