= 2007–08 Euroleague quarterfinals =

Euroleague 2007–08 quarterfinals are the four quarterfinals of Euroleague 2007-08, and its main leading to Final Four. There are only eight teams, who will play two or three games series. Third games will be played, if necessary.

Group D 1st	Group E 2nd
Group E 1st	Group D 2nd
Group F 1st	Group G 2nd
Group G 1st	Group F 2nd
Team on left holds the home advantage

== Bracket ==
Team #1	Agg.	Team #2	1st leg	2nd leg	3rd leg^{*}
Montepaschi Siena (Italy)	2 - 0	(Turkey) Fenerbahçe	73 - 66	86 - 65	–
TAU Cerámica (Spain)	2 - 1	(Serbia) Partizan Belgrade	74 - 66	55 - 76	85 - 68
Maccabi Tel Aviv (Israel)	2 - 1	(Spain) AXA FC Barcelona	81 - 75	74 - 83	88 - 75
CSKA Moscow (Russia)	2 - 1	(Greece) Olympiacos	74 - 76	83 - 73	81 - 56

* if necessary

== Results ==
=== Quarterfinal 1 ===
April 1
20:30

(Report)

Montepaschi Siena (Italy)	73–66	(Turkey) Fenerbahçe
Scoring by quarter: 23-16, 16-20, 16-15, 18-15
Pts: Kšyštof Lavrinovič 16; Rebs: Shaun Stonerook 8 Asts: McIntyre, Thornton 4		Pts: Erden, Kinsey 12; Rebs: Emir Preldžič 8 Asts: Emir Preldžič 4

Palasport Mens Sana, Siena
Attendance: 6,500

April 3
19:15

(Report)

Fenerbahçe (Turkey)	65–86	(Italy) Montepaschi Siena
Scoring by quarter: 15-25, 19-12, 11-25, 20-24
Pts: Ömer Aşık 12; Rebs: Mirsad Türkcan 8 Asts: Will Solomon 3		Pts: Thornton, Lavrinovič 18; Rebs: Romain Sato 8 Asts: Terrell McIntyre 6
Montepaschi Siena won series, 2–0

Abdi İpekçi Arena, Istanbul
Attendance: 7,000

==== Quarterfinal 2 ====
April 1
20:30

(Report)

TAU Cerámica (Spain)	74–66	(Serbia) Partizan Belgrade
Scoring by quarter: 18-16, 18-22, 20-12, 18-16
Pts: Zoran Planinić 18; Rebs: Pete Mickeal 7 Asts: Sergi Vidal 1		Pts: Dušan Kecman 13; Rebs: Novica Veličković 8 Asts: Milt Palacio 4

Fernando Buesa Arena, Vitoria-Gasteiz
Attendance: 8,400

April 3
20:00

(Report)

Partizan Belgrade (Serbia)	76–55	(Spain) TAU Cerámica
Scoring by quarter: 25-15, 11-16, 18-17, 22-7
Pts: Nikola Peković 19; Rebs: Novica Veličković 12; Asts: Palacio, Veličković 4		Pts: Igor Rakočević 15; Rebs: James Singleton 6 Asts: Pablo Prigioni 5

Pionir Hall, Belgrade
Attendance: 7,123

April 9
20:30

(Report)

TAU Cerámica (Spain)	85–68	(Serbia) Partizan Belgrade
Scoring by quarter: 16-19, 22-13, 22-21, 25-15
Pts: Pete Mickeal 19; Rebs: Tiago Splitter 9 Asts: Pablo Prigioni 3		Pts: Uroš Tripković 16; Rebs: Dušan Kecman 7 Asts: Uroš Tripković 3
TAU Cerámica won series, 2–1

Fernando Buesa Arena, Vitoria-Gasteiz
Attendance: 9,700

=== Quarterfinal 3 ===
April 1
19:50

(Report)

Maccabi Tel Aviv (Israel)	81–75	(Spain) AXA FC Barcelona
Scoring by quarter: 16-14, 20-15, 21-28, 24-18
Pts: Esteban Batista 15; Rebs: Terence Morris 10; Asts: Yotam Halperin 5		Pts: Ersan İlyasova 21; Rebs: Ersan İlyasova 9 Asts: Pepe Sánchez 6

Nokia Arena, Tel Aviv
Attendance: 11,000

April 3
20:45

(Report)

AXA FC Barcelona (Spain)	83–74	(Israel) Maccabi Tel Aviv
Scoring by quarter: 23-22, 20-15, 21-21, 19-16
Pts: Gianluca Basile 34; Rebs: Fran Vázquez 10; Asts: Roger Grimau 5		Pts: Omri Casspi 18; Rebs: Terence Morris 11; Asts: Nikola Vujčić 4

Palau Blaugrana, Barcelona
Attendance: 6,739

April 10
19:50

(Report)

Maccabi Tel Aviv (Israel)	88–75	(Spain) AXA FC Barcelona
Scoring by quarter: 18-19, 25-15, 20-19, 25-22
Pts: Bynum, Bluthenthal 21; Rebs: Terence Morris 8 Asts: Yotam Halperin 9		Pts: Roger Grimau 18; Rebs: Fran Vázquez 13; Asts: Jaka Lakovič 4
Maccabi Tel Aviv won series 2–1

Nokia Arena, Tel Aviv
Attendance: 11,000

=== Quarterfinal 4 ===
April 1
18:15

(Report)

CSKA Moscow (Russia)	74–76	(Greece) Olympiacos
Scoring by quarter: 20-24, 12-15, 20-23, 22-14
Pts: Matjaž Smodiš 21; Rebs: Matjaž Smodiš 5 Asts: Theodoros Papaloukas 4		Pts: Qyntel Woods 20; Rebs: Bourousis, Printezis 5 Asts: Lynn Greer 6

CSKA Universal Sports Hall, Moscow
Attendance: 5,000

April 3
19:45

(Report)

Olympiacos (Greece)	73–83	(Russia) CSKA Moscow
Scoring by quarter: 27-15, 11-27, 18-28, 17-13
Pts: Qyntel Woods 19; Rebs: Woods, Printezis 7 Asts: Lynn Greer 5		Pts: Ramūnas Šiškauskas 20; Rebs: Four players with 4 Asts: Theodoros Papaloukas 7

Peace and Friendship Stadium, Athens
Attendance: 12,000

April 9
18:15

(Report)

CSKA Moscow (Russia)	81–56	(Greece) Olympiacos
Scoring by quarter: 22-16, 19-13, 20-21, 20-6
Pts: Ramūnas Šiškauskas 24; Rebs: Matjaž Smodiš 6 Asts: Holden		Pts: Panayiotis Vasilopoulos 17; Rebs: Giorgos Printezis 5 Asts: Blakney, Greer 4
CSKA Moscow won series 2–1

CSKA Universal Sports Hall, Moscow
Attendance: 5,000
