= Ajantha Mendis =

Sri Lankan cricketer (born 1985)

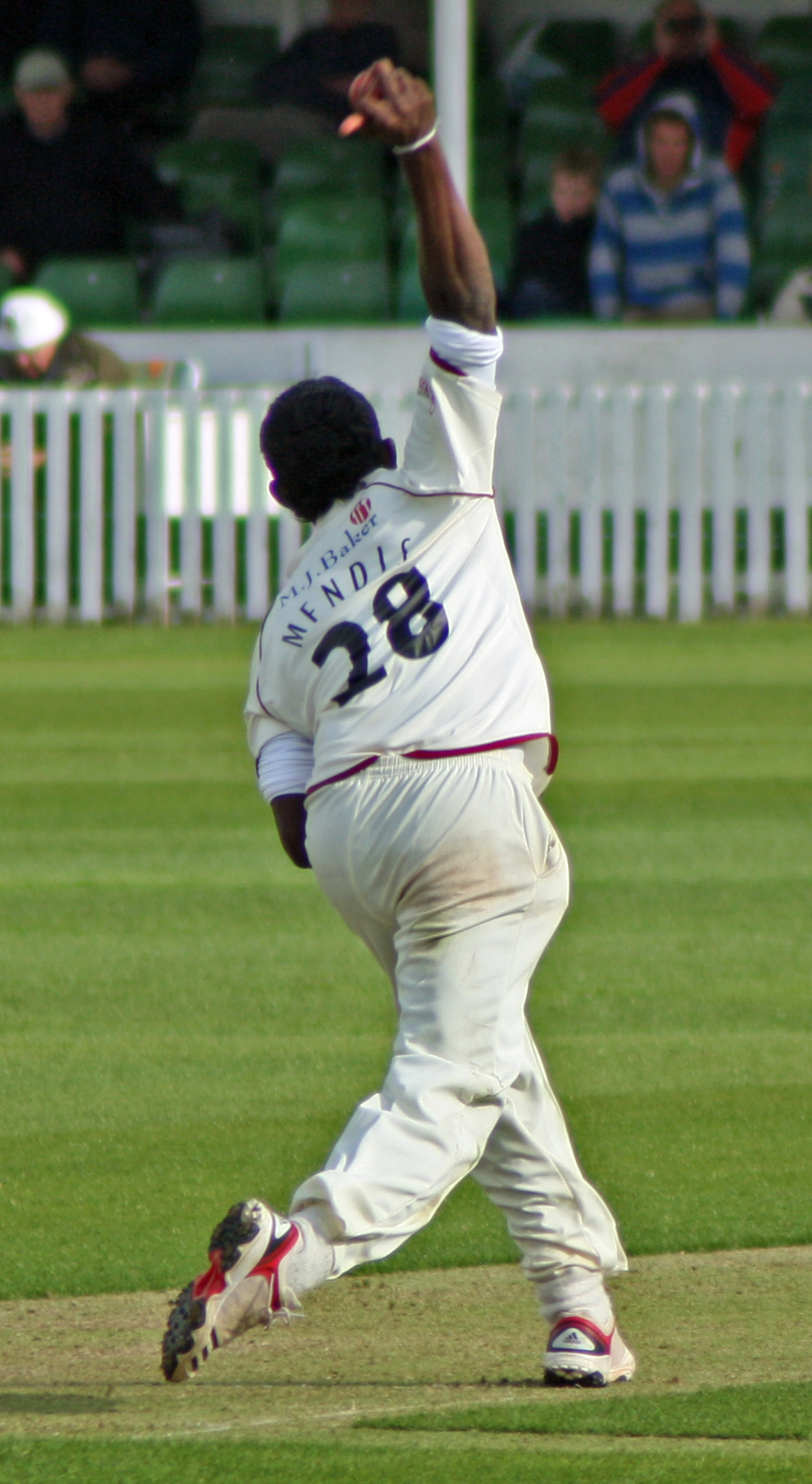

Personal information
- Full name: Balapuwaduge Ajantha Winslow Mendis
- Born: 11 March 1985 (age 41); Moratuwa, Sri Lanka
- Height: 5 ft 11 in (1.80 m)
- Batting: Right-handed
- Bowling: Right-arm off spin
- Role: Bowler

International information
- National side: Sri Lanka (2008–2015)
- Test debut (cap 109): 23 July 2008 v India
- Last Test: 24 July 2014 v South Africa
- ODI debut (cap 134): 10 April 2008 v West Indies
- Last ODI: 26 December 2015 v New Zealand
- ODI shirt no.: 40
- T20I debut (cap 22): 10 October 2008 v Zimbabwe
- Last T20I: 27 May 2014 v England
- T20I shirt no.: 40

Domestic team information
- Years: Team
- 2007–2019: Wayamba
- 2006–2019: Sri Lanka Army
- 2011: Somerset
- 2008–2010: Kolkata Knight Riders
- 2012: Nagenahira Nagas
- 2013: Pune Warriors
- 2014: Lahore Qalandars
- 2014: Sydney Thunder
- 2015: Sylhet Super Stars

Career statistics
Competition	Test	ODI	T20I	FC
Matches	19	87	39	81
Runs scored	213	188	8	1,889
Batting average	16.38	8.17	2.66	17.99
100s/50s	0/1	0/0	0/0	1/7
Top score	78	21*	4*	101
Balls bowled	4,730	4,154	885	13,231
Wickets	70	152	66	307
Bowling average	34.77	21.86	14.42	23.28
5 wickets in innings	4	3	2	18
10 wickets in match	1	0	0	3
Best bowling	6/99	6/13	6/8	7/37
Catches/stumpings	2/–	15/–	6/–	25/–
- Source: ESPNcricinfo, 26 December 2016

Ajantha Mendis
- Born: 11 March 1985 – Moratuwa
- Military career
- Allegiance: Sri Lanka
- Branch: Sri Lanka Army
- Service years: 2005 –
- Rank: Lieutenant
- Unit: Sri Lanka Artillery

Balapuwaduge Ajantha Winslow Mendis (Sinhala: අජන්ත මෙන්ඩිස්; born 11 March 1985) better known as Ajantha Mendis, is a Sri Lankan former international cricketer who played for the Sri Lankan national cricket team in all three formats. He is also known as the "mystery spinner" due to his unusual variations in bowling action. In August 2019, he retired from all forms of cricket. Mendis was a member of the Sri Lankan team that won the 2014 ICC World Twenty20.

Mendis made his One Day International debut against the West Indies at Port of Spain in 2008 and took 3 for 39. He also played for the Kolkata Knight Riders in the Indian Premier League. He holds the record for the fastest 50 wickets in ODIs, with 19 matches.

His first Test Match was against India at Colombo on 23 July 2008, in which he returned match figures of 8–132, thereby becoming the first Sri Lankan bowler to get an eight-wicket haul on Test debut. Mendis won the Emerging Player of the Year award at the ICC Awards ceremony held in Dubai in September 2008.

Until February 2017, he was the only bowler to have taken six wickets in a Twenty20 International, and he has achieved the feat twice, claiming the world record figures of 6 wickets for 8 runs for Sri Lanka against Zimbabwe on 18 September 2012 which were later broken by Deepak Chahar in 2019 in a T20I against Bangladesh.

== Early years and personal life ==
Born on 11 March 1985, Mendis hails from a hamlet in Moratuwa. He is the third child in a family of five with an elder brother and a sister. He was raised Catholic. He has had his basic education at St Anthony's College at Kadalana in his village where there were no facilities at all for sports. He subsequently entered Moratuwa Maha Vidyalaya in the year 2000. During a cricket coaching class, Mendis' talents were initially identified by the school coach named Mr. Lucky Rogers back in the year 1998 when he was just 13 years of age. In the year 2000 he represented the school under-15 cricket team and he was selected to the first eleven team. He also deputised for the school team captain. This slow medium bowler with a variation of leg spin was adjudged the Best Bowler at the big matches twice in 2001 and 2002.

== Military career ==
Sri Lanka Artillery Cricket Committee noticed his talents when he played a cricket match against the Army under-23 Division 11 during 2003/2004 tournaments. Following this, he was invited to enlist in the regular force of the Sri Lanka Army, particularly due to the low number of cricketers from Colombo schools joining the Army in the recent years. He enlisted, partly due to the reason that his father, the breadwinner of the family had died the week before due to a heart attack.

Following basic training he played for the army team and saw active military service as a Gunner in the Sri Lanka Artillery, a regiment of the Sri Lanka Army. Following the Asia Cup final, he was promoted to the rank of Sergeant on 7 July 2008, and the next day commissioned as a Second Lieutenant.

== Domestic and franchise cricket ==
Mendis has represented the Army in 23 limited over matches and 59 two/three-day matches, in which he has 38 wickets and 244 wickets respectively to his credit. Mendis bowls off-spin as his stock delivery and he has a few more variations in his armoury-leg spin, top spin and faster bowl. All this was developed during 2006/2007 domestic season on his own. He also extended his purple patch in the domestic season 2007/2008 under-23 division 1 tournament and was later selected to the pool of "Academy Squad" organised by Sri Lanka Cricket. There, he was able to polish his cricketing skills further. He had the opportunity of touring neighbouring India on an eight-day tour in June 2007 where he was given the opportunity to play two two-day matches. In the meantime, Sri Lanka Cricket selectors could not ignore his performance in the Premier Limited Over Tournament 2007/2008 and got him selected to play in the "Provincial Tournament 2008" representing "Wayamba Province" under the National Captain. In that tournament, he performed exceptionally well with the ball. Local TV commentators predicted him as the ideal replacement for senior spinner Muttiah Muralitharan in time to come and nicknamed him the "Mysterious Bowler". His performance in the said tournament got the National selectors to observe him more closely, after he became the most successful bowler by taking 68 wickets in nine matches, which is also a record in any form of domestic cricket.

In the 2010 County Championship, Mendis was to play for Hampshire as their overseas player for the season as a replacement for Imran Tahir, but he was unable to fulfill his contract and never appeared for the county.

On 18 May 2008, Kolkata Knight Riders signed Mendis, until the end of the 2008 season. At the 2013 Indian Premier League Auctions held in Chennai, India on 3 February 2013, Mendis proved to be one of the most expensive players sold, purchased by the Pune Warriors India for $725,000.

Mendis played for Lahore Qalandars in Pakistan Super League held at U.A.E in February 2016.

== 2009 Lahore Attack ==
On 3 March 2009, the bus that carried the Sri Lankan cricketers to the Gaddafi Stadium in Lahore, for the third day's play of the second Test match between Sri Lanka and Pakistan, was fired at by masked gunmen. Mendis was among seven Sri Lankan cricketers who were injured in the attack, which killed five policemen who guarded the bus.

== International career ==
=== Golden debut years ===
After becoming the leading wicket-taker in the 2007-08 Premier League with 54 wickets at an average of ten, Mendis was picked in the ODI squad for the series against West Indies. He made his One Day International (ODI) debut on 10 April 2008 in first ODI against West Indies. He announced his arrival on the international stage with three for 39 off 10 overs in this game, and dumbfounded the West Indian batsmen with his range of variations without a perceptible change in his action. Rob Steen summed up the impact of this initial performance by stating "I have just seen the future of spin bowling – and his name is Ajantha Mendis." However, West Indies won the match by one wicket. In the second ODI, he bowled four wicketless overs for 21 runs and West Indies won the match and sealed the series 2–0.

During 2008 Asia Cup, Mendis made his mark with match winning bowling performance, which took him to won the player of the series of award as well. Against Pakistan on 29 June 2008, he took 4 for 47 and Sri Lanka won the match by 64 runs. On 6 July 2008, in the Asia cup final against India, Mendis delivered a match winning spell of astonishing figures of 6 for 13. Sri Lanka won their fourth Asia cup title by 100 runs.

Mendis made his Test debut in Test cricket against India in at the Sinhalese Sports Club Ground, Colombo, on 23 July 2008. He claimed his first wicket in his fifth over, bowling Rahul Dravid out with a delivery now christened the carrom ball, that turned from middle and hit off stump. He went on to claim the wickets of Anil Kumble, Zaheer Khan and VVS Laxman to finish with figures of 4 for 72. He followed this up with 4 for 60 in India's second innings. His match figures of 8 for 132 are the best by any Sri Lankan bowler on Test debut, bettering Kosala Kuruppuarachchi's 7 for 85 against Pakistan in 1985–86. After the game Muttiah Muralitharan stated that "When I started playing Test cricket, I was not as good as Mendis. He is exceptional. He is the future of Sri Lankan cricket". Mendis collected his first ten-wicket haul in the very next match, which Sri Lanka went on to lose. With 26 wickets (ave.18.38) in the series, Mendis broke Alec Bedser's world record for most wickets by a bowler on his debut in a three-Test series. He was named player of the series award for his efforts.

On 10 October 2008 during first match in Quadrangular Twenty20 Series, Mendis made his Twenty20 debut against Zimbabwe in King City, Canada as the 22nd T20I cap for Sri Lanka. He claimed four for 15 in four overs and won the man of the match award. In the next game he took four wickets for 17 against Canada and went on to take three wickets for 23 in the four-nation series final against Pakistan, helping his side to a five-wicket win. For his remarkable performance of 11 wickets for 55 in just three games, Ajantha Mendis was adjudged the player of the series.

=== Test cricket ===
On 6 August 2010 during the series against India, Mendis scored his highest Test score of 78.

For his performances in 2008, he was named in the World Test XI by ESPNcricinfo.

=== One Day Internationals ===
Ajantha Mendis, playing his eighth ODI, picked up the first six-wicket haul in the Asia Cup final against India in July 2008. His 6 for 13 is the third-best bowling performance in a tournament final, and the third-best for a spinner in ODIs. His 17 wickets is the best for an edition of the Asia Cup, and he bagged those wickets at an astounding average of 8.52. Ajantha Mendis won the man of the match award in the finals as well as the player of the tournament award for his efforts.

He has also broken fastest 50 wicket record in ODI, previously held by Ajit Agarkar of India for 23 matches. He broke the record by snatching 50 wickets in just 19 matches.

For his performances in 2009 and 2014, he was named in the World ODI XI by the ICC. For his performances in 2008, he was also named in the World ODI XI by ESPNcricinfo.

Mendis played Compaq cup in 2009 but unfortunately he didn't play well as India won the series.

Mendis was not included to the 2015 Cricket World Cup team and he did not play in the other bilateral series in late 2014 to late 2015. He was included to the ODI and T20I series against West indies in October 2015. He took 2 wickets in the first ODI at R Premadasa Stadium and with these two wickets, he reached 150 ODI wickets, becoming the 8th Sri Lankan to reach that milestone. In the batting, Sri Lanka was in good position to win the game, but with the magical bowling by Sunil Narine, Sri Lanka lost 9 wickets with 21 more runs to win the game. Mendis came on to bat and scored a magnificent 21 runs, guided the team to win the match by 1 wicket. He smashed a huge six to Johnson Charles for a free hit, through long-on to reach his highest ODI score of unbeaten 21 runs.

=== Twenty20 cricket ===
In the 2009 ICC World Twenty20 in England, Mendis was the third highest wicket taker, behind Pakistan's Saeed Ajmal and Umar Gul. He was a contender for Man of the Tournament, but came third behind teammate Tillakaratne Dilshan. He was named in the 'Team of the Tournament' by ESPNcricinfo for the 2009 T20I World Cup.

Mendis has twice set the record for best figures in a Twenty20 International. On 8 August 2011, he took six wickets for 16 runs in the second Twenty20 international against Australia, becoming the first bowler to take six wickets in a Twenty20 international, and surpassing Umar Gul's five wickets for six runs recorded against New Zealand in 2009. The following year, on 18 September 2012 in the opening match of the 2012 ICC World Twenty20 against Zimbabwe, Mendis bettered this record by taking six wickets for eight runs. Up to date, Mendis is the only bowler to take six wicket hauls in Two Twenty20 internationals.

=== Back injury ===
Mendis faced a severe back injury in second half of 2014. It was like a disc fracture in the back. He has not been able to bowl at all during this period. Now slowly with rest and rehab, he has started to do a bit of running and bowling.

== Bowling style ==
Mendis, although classified as slow-medium, bowls a mixture of deliveries, including googlies, off-breaks, top-spinners, flippers and leg-breaks, as well as the carrom ball, released with a flick of his middle finger. For Sri Lanka Army in 2007–08 he averaged a mere 10.56 and took 46 wickets in six games, his strike rate a startling 31. This gained him a call-up to the full Sri Lanka squad for the Caribbean tour in April 2008.

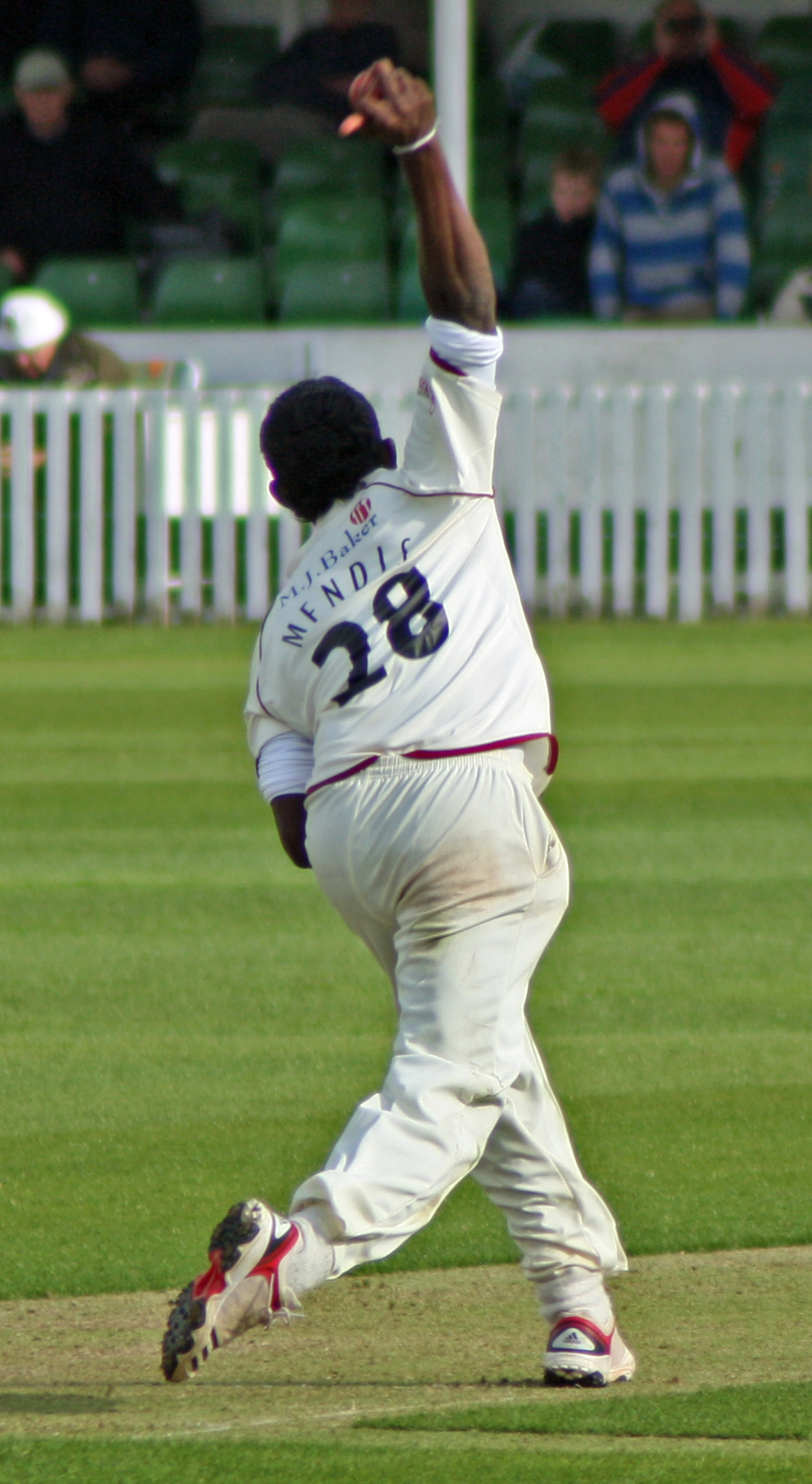
Mendis bowling

The veteran West Indies cricket writer Tony Becca wrote in the Jamaica Gleaner: "Mendis bowls everything. With a smile on his face as he caresses the ball before delivering it, he bowls the offbreak, he bowls the legbreak, he bowls the googly, he bowls the flipper, he bowls a straight delivery, he bowls them with different grips and different actions, he bowls them with a different trajectory and at a different pace, and he disguises them brilliantly. The result is that he mesmerises, or bamboozles, batsmen.

Jerome Jayaratne, the Sri Lanka Cricket Academy coach, said: "Mendis is unusual, freaky, and has developed a ball which he releases with a snap of his fingers (carrom ball), which is very unusual compared to other orthodox spin bowlers." That ball is reminiscent of the former Australia spinner Johnny Gleeson, who had a similar delivery.

Although the ball can be made to either turn away from or into a right-handed batsman, Mendis uses it to turn away from a right-handed batsman, to contrast it with his off-breaks and googlies. The Australian Test cricketer and coach Peter Philpott actually predicted the rise of a bowler such as Mendis in a book written in 1973.

"...Eventually, I see the Iverson method being best employed by an orthodox off-spinner. Instead of a basic Iverson attack with occasional orthodox off-spin, there is a great future for an accurate off-spinner who produces a difficult-to-detect leg spinner every now and then. I could visualise such a bowler causing great concern amongst batsmen, and young off-spinners might be well rewarded for experimentation in this field..."

== ICC Awards ==
On 10 September 2008, Ajantha Mendis won the "Emerging Player of the Year" award at the ICC Awards ceremony in Dubai. Mendis was the top choice of the 25-person Voting Academy, coming in ahead of England's up-and-coming Stuart Broad, South Africa's fast bowler Morne Morkel and India's fast bowler Ishant Sharma.

The Emerging Player of the Year Award was one of eight individual prizes given at the 2008, ICC Awards. Players eligible for this award must be under 26 years of age at the start of the voting period (9 August 2007) and have played no more than five Test matches and/or 10 ODIs before the start of the voting period.

Preceded by Shaun Tait	Emerging Player of the Year; 2008	Succeeded by Peter Siddle
