= Bangladeshi cricket team in Pakistan in 2008 =

International cricket tour

	Pakistan	Bangladesh
- Dates: 7 – 22 April 2008
Captains	Shoaib Malik	Mohammad Ashraful

One Day International series
- Results: Pakistan won the 5-match series 5–0
Most runs	Salman Butt (451)	Shakib Al Hasan (192)
Most wickets	Shahid Afridi (12)	Mashrafe Mortaza (8)
- Player of the series: Salman Butt (Pak)

Twenty20 International series
- Results: Pakistan won the 1-match series 1–0
Most runs	Misbah-ul-Haq (87)	Nazimuddin (42)
Most wickets	Mansoor Amjad (3)	Mashrafe Mortaza (1)
- Player of the series: Misbah-ul-Haq (Pak)

The Bangladeshi cricket team toured Pakistan in April 2008 to play five one day internationals and a Twenty20 International. The series was arranged at short notice following Australia's decision to pull out of their scheduled tour of Pakistan due to security reasons.

== Squads ==
ODI and T20I Squads
Pakistan	Bangladesh
Shoaib Malik (c)	Mohammad Ashraful (c)
Kamran Akmal (wk)	Dhiman Ghosh (wk)
Misbah-ul-Haq	Mashrafe Mortaza (vc)
Younis Khan	Abdur Razzak
Mohammad Yousuf	Aftab Ahmed
Salman Butt	Farhad Reza
Nasir Jamshed	Junaid Siddique
Shahid Afridi	Mahmudullah
Sohail Tanvir	Nazimuddin
Umar Gul	Shahadat Hossain
Iftikhar Anjum	Shahriar Nafees
Naumanullah	Shakib Al Hasan
Wahab Riaz	Syed Rasel
Mansoor Amjad (T20I squad)	Tamim Iqbal
Bazid Khan	Mehrab Hossain (Standby Player)
Fawad Alam	Nazmul Hossain (Standby Player)
Sarfaraz Ahmed (wk)	Mushfiqur Rahman(wk), (Standby Player)

== ODI series ==
=== 1st ODI ===
8 April 2008
Scorecard

Pakistan; 322/5 (50 overs)	v	Bangladesh; 129 (29.5 overs)
Mohammad Yousuf 108* (103); Farhad Reza 2/41 (10 overs)		Mashrafe Mortaza 25 (20); Sohail Tanvir 3/29 (7 overs)

Pakistan won by 152 runs (D/L)
Gaddafi Stadium, Lahore
Umpires: Aleem Dar (Pak) and Steve Bucknor (WI)
Player of the match: Mohammad Yousuf (Pak)

- Pakistan won the toss and elected to bat.
- Due to floodlights failure, Bangladesh were given a revised target of 282 from 39 overs.

=== 2nd ODI ===
11 April 2008
Scorecard

Bangladesh; 225/8 (48.2 overs)	v	Pakistan; 160/3 (23.2 overs)
Tamim Iqbal 60 (78); Shahid Afridi 3/33 (10 overs)		Salman Butt 76 (72); Farhad Reza 1/22 (4 overs)

Pakistan won by 7 wickets (D/L)
Iqbal Stadium, Faislabad
Umpires: Aleem Dar (Pak) and Steve Bucknor (WI)
Player of the match: Salman Butt (Pak)

- Bangladesh won the toss and elected to bat.
- Rain during Bangladesh's innings set Pakistan a revised target of 158 from 25 overs.

=== 3rd ODI ===
13 April 2008
Scorecard

Pakistan; 308/8 (50 overs)	v	Bangladesh; 285/7 (50 overs)
Salman Butt 132 (127); Mashrafe Mortaza 2/47 (10 overs)		Shakib Al Hasan 75 (73); Shahid Afridi 2/48 (10 overs)

Pakistan won by 23 runs
Gaddafi Stadium, Lahore
Umpires: Steve Bucknor (WI) and Nadeem Ghauri (Pak)
Player of the match: Salman Butt (Pak)

- Pakistan won the toss and elected to bat.

=== 4th ODI ===
16 April 2008
Scorecard

Bangladesh; 210 (49.1 overs)	v	Pakistan; 212/3 (44.3 overs)
Shakib Al Hasan 108 (120); Sohail Khan 3/30 (6.1 overs)		Salman Butt 74 (84); Shakib Al Hasan 1/34 (9 overs)

Pakistan won by 7 wickets
Multan Cricket Stadium, Multan
Umpires: Steve Bucknor (WI) and Zameer Haider (Pak)
Player of the match: Shakib Al Hasan (Ban)

- Bangladesh won the toss and elected to bat.

=== 5th ODI ===
19 April 2008
Scorecard

Pakistan; 329/9 (50 overs)	v	Bangladesh; 179 (40.4 overs)
Salman Butt 136 (124); Mashrafe Mortaza 4/65 (10 overs)		Mahmudullah (37); Mohammad Asif 3/35 (8.1 overs)

Pakistan won by 150 runs
National Stadium, Karachi
Umpires: Steve Bucknor (WI) and Nadeem Ghauri (Pak)
Player of the match: Mohammad Asif (Pak)

- Pakistan won the toss and elected to bat.
- Naumanullah (Pak) made his ODI debut.

== Only T20I ==
20 April 2008
Scorecard

Pakistan; 203/5 (20 overs)	v	Bangladesh; 101 (16 overs)
Misbah-ul-Haq 87* (53); Shakib Al Hasan 1/33 (4 Overs)		Nazimuddin 42 (48); Mansoor Amjad 3/3 (1 Over)

Pakistan won by 102 runs
National Stadium, Karachi
Umpires: Nadeem Ghauri (Pak) and Zameer Haider (Pak)
Player of the match: Misbah-ul-Haq (Pak)

- Pakistan won the toss and elected to bat.
- Wahab Riaz, Mansoor Amjad (Pak) and Dhiman Ghosh (Ban) all made their T20I debuts.
