= 2007–08 Euroleague Top 16 Group G =

Standings and Results for Group G of the Top 16 phase of the 2007–08 Euroleague basketball tournament.

Main page: 2007–08 Euroleague

Key to colors
Top two places in each group advance to quarterfinals
Eliminated from contention

== Standings ==
	Team	Pld	W	L	PF	PA	Diff
1.	(Russia) CSKA Moscow	6	4	2	448	386	+62
2.	(Spain) AXA FC Barcelona	6	3	3	393	383	+10
3.	(Spain) Unicaja Málaga	6	3	3	412	418	−6
4.	(Italy) Lottomatica Roma	6	2	4	383	449	−66

- Barcelona win the tiebreaker over Unicaja for second place by having scored 1 more point in their two matches.

== Fixtures and results ==
All times given below are in Central European Time.

=== Game 1 ===
February 13–14, 2008

February 13
18:15

(Report)

CSKA Moscow (Russia)	72–71	(Italy) Lottomatica Roma
Scoring by quarter: 15-14, 14-18, 15-19, 28-20
Pts: Langdon 22; Rebs: Gorée 9 Asts: Papaloukas 5		Pts: Ukić, Lorbek 13; Rebs: Lorbek 7 Asts: Ukić 4

CSKA Universal Sports Hall, Moscow
Attendance: 4,000

February 14
20:45

(Report)

AXA FC Barcelona (Spain)	64–62	(Spain) Unicaja Málaga
Scoring by quarter: 17-9, 23-22, 13-16, 11-15
Pts: Lakovič 14; Rebs: Vázquez 7 Asts: Sánchez 6		Pts: Haislip 15; Rebs: Welsch 8 Asts: Kus, Rodríguez 2

Palau Blaugrana, Barcelona
Attendance: 4,963

=== Game 2 ===
February 20–21, 2008

February 20
18:15

(Report)

CSKA Moscow (Russia)	72–55	(Spain) AXA FC Barcelona
Scoring by quarter: 16-11, 16-14, 16-18, 24-12
Pts: Andersen 20; Rebs: Khryapa 9 Asts: Papaloukas, Langdon 3		Pts: Lakovič 11; Rebs: Acker 6 Asts: Sánchez 3

CSKA Universal Sports Hall, Moscow
Attendance: 5,000

February 21
20:30

(Report)

Lottomatica Roma (Italy)	75–67	(Spain) Unicaja Málaga
Scoring by quarter: 12-17, 27-17, 19-19, 17-14
Pts: Ukić 19; Rebs: Fučka 9 Asts: Four players with 2		Pts: Haislip 20; Rebs: Jiménez 9 Asts: Welsch 3

PalaLottomatica, Rome
Attendance: 4,458

=== Game 3 ===
February 27–28, 2008

February 27
20:45

(Report)

Unicaja Málaga (Spain)	72–67	(Russia) CSKA Moscow
Scoring by quarter: 21-16, 18-17, 19-13, 14-21
Pts: Santiago 20; Rebs: Welsch 8 Asts: Rodríguez, Welsch 3		Pts: Šiškauskas 12; Rebs: Gorée 9 Asts: Papaloukas 5

J. M. Martín Carpena Arena, Málaga
Attendance: 9,700

February 28
20:45

(Report)

AXA FC Barcelona (Spain)	86–57	(Italy) Lottomatica Roma
Scoring by quarter: 30-11, 11-14, 18-15, 27-17
Pts: Basile 19; Rebs: Trias 8 Asts: İlyasova, Lakovič, Sánchez 3		Pts: Hawkins 18; Rebs: Lorbek 6 Asts: Ray 4

Palau Blaugrana, Barcelona
Attendance: 4,521

=== Game 4 ===
March 5–6, 2008

March 5
18:15

(Report)

Unicaja Málaga (Spain)	62–61	(Spain) AXA FC Barcelona
Scoring by quarter: 11-15, 23-17, 14-15, 14-14
Pts: Davor Kus 15; Rebs: Boniface N'Dong 9 Asts: Germán Gabriel 2		Pts: Jaka Lakovič 16; Rebs: Ersan İlyasova 7 Asts: Jaka Lakovič 3

J. M. Martín Carpena Arena, Málaga
Attendance: 10,000

March 6
20:30

(Report)

Lottomatica Roma (Italy)	54–82	(Russia) CSKA Moscow
Scoring by quarter: 10-28, 15-20, 15-16, 14-18
Pts: Ibrahim Jaaber 18; Rebs: Erazem Lorbek 8 Asts: David Hawkins 2		Pts: Ramūnas Šiškauskas 25; Rebs: Marcus Gorée 9 Asts: Theodoros Papaloukas 12

PalaLottomatica, Rome
Attendance: 5,775

=== Game 5 ===
March 12, 2008

March 12
18:15

(Report)

CSKA Moscow (Russia)	93–70	(Spain) Unicaja Málaga
Scoring by quarter: 24-16, 20-10, 23-18, 26-26
Pts: Marcus Gorée 16; Rebs: Šiškauskas, Andersen 7 Asts: Theodoros Papaloukas 7		Pts: Germán Gabriel 14; Rebs: Jiří Welsch 7 Asts: Popović, Welsch 3

CSKA Universal Sports Hall, Moscow
Attendance: 5,000

March 12
20:30

(Report)

Lottomatica Roma (Italy)	68–63	(Spain) AXA FC Barcelona
Scoring by quarter: 22-12, 11-18, 13-20, 22-13
Pts: Erazem Lorbek 16; Rebs: Rodrigo De la Fuente 7 Asts: Eight players with 1		Pts: Roger Grimau 21; Rebs: Jordi Trias 8 Asts: Pepe Sánchez 7

PalaLottomatica, Rome
Attendance: 4,553

=== Game 6 ===
March 20, 2008

March 20
19:00

(Report)

AXA FC Barcelona (Spain)	64–62	(Russia) CSKA Moscow
Scoring by quarter: 15-16, 17-17, 18-15, 14-14
Pts: Jaka Lakovič 14; Rebs: Denis Marconato 9 Asts: Lakovič, Grimau 3		Pts: Šiškauskas, Khryapa 13; Rebs: Smodiš, Andersen 8 Asts: Theodoros Papaloukas 10

Palau Blaugrana, Barcelona
Attendance: 6,558

March 20
19:00

(Report)

Unicaja Málaga (Spain)	79–58	(Italy) Lottomatica Roma
Scoring by quarter: 19-12, 14-17, 21-17, 25-12
Pts: Welsch, Castle 15; Rebs: Carlos Jiménez 10; Asts: Berni Rodríguez 5		Pts: Rodrigo De la Fuente 15; Rebs: Four players with 4 Asts: Roko Ukić 4

J. M. Martín Carpena Arena, Málaga
Attendance: 9,900
