= Sri Lankan cricket team in the West Indies in 2007–08 =

Sri Lankan cricket team in West Indies in 2008
| | West Indies | Sri Lanka |
- Dates: 17 March – 15 April 2008
| Captains | Chris Gayle | Mahela Jayawardene |

Test series
- Result: 2-match series drawn 1–1
| Most runs | Ramnaresh Sarwan (311) | Malinda Warnapura (217) |
| Most wickets | Jerome Taylor (11) | Chaminda Vaas (12); Muttiah Muralitharan (12) |
- Player of the series: Ramnaresh Sarwan (WI)

One Day International series
- Results: West Indies won the 3-match series 2–0
| Most runs | Shivnarine Chanderpaul (114) | Chamara Kapugedera (135) |
| Most wickets | Dwayne Bravo (7) | Nuwan Kulasekara (6) |
- Player of the series: Shivnarine Chanderpaul (WI)

The Sri Lanka national cricket team toured the West Indies in March and April 2008 to play two Test matches and three Limited Overs Internationals.

== Squads ==
| Tests | | ODIs | |
| West Indies | Sri Lanka | West Indies | Sri Lanka |
|---|---|---|---|
| Chris Gayle (c); Sulieman Benn; Dwayne Bravo; Shivnarine Chanderpaul; Sewnarine Chattergoon; Pedro Collins; Fidel Edwards; Ryan Hinds; Amit Jaggernauth; Daren Powell; Denesh Ramdin (wk); Marlon Samuels; Ramnaresh Sarwan; Devon Smith; Jerome Taylor | Mahela Jayawardene (c); Ishara Amerasinghe; Tillakaratne Dilshan; Rangana Herath; Prasanna Jayawardene (wk); Nuwan Kulasekara; Muttiah Muralitharan; Thilan Samaraweera; Kumar Sangakkara; Chamara Silva; Thilan Thushara; Chaminda Vaas; Michael Vandort; Malinda Warnapura; Chanaka Welegedara | Chris Gayle (c); Sulieman Benn; Dwayne Bravo; Patrick Browne (wk); Shivnarine Chanderpaul; Sewnarine Chattergoon; Fidel Edwards; Runako Morton; Kieron Pollard; Daren Powell; Denesh Ramdin (wk); Darren Sammy; Marlon Samuels; Ramnaresh Sarwan; Devon Smith; Jerome Taylor | Mahela Jayawardene (c); Ishara Amerasinghe; Malinga Bandara; Tillakaratne Dilshan; Chamara Kapugedera; Nuwan Kulasekara; Ajantha Mendis; Jehan Mubarak; Kumar Sangakkara (wk); Chamara Silva; Upul Tharanga; Thilan Thushara; Mahela Udawatte; Chaminda Vaas; Kaushalya Weeraratne |

== Tour Matches ==
=== GCB President's XI v Sri Lankans ===
17–19 March
Scorecard

| Sri Lankans | v | Guyana Cricket Board President's XI |
| 492/5d (117.5 overs); Malinda Warnapura 132 (184); Shamarh Brooks 1/20 (3 overs) | | 248 (62 overs); Shamarah Brooks 68; Rangana Herath 5/67 (19 overs) |
| 177/6 (63 overs); Malinda Warnapura 50; Devendra Bishoo 3/25 |

Match drawn
Providence Stadium, Georgetown, Guyana
Umpires: Colin Alfred and Eddie Nicholls

- Sri Lankans won the toss and elected to bat.

=== West Indies A v Sri Lankans ===
29–31 March
Scorecard

| West Indies A | v | Sri Lanka |

Match cancelled
Shaw Park, Scarborough, Tobago

- The match was cancelled due to "flight problems".

== Test series ==
=== First Test ===
22–26 March
Scorecard

| Sri Lanka | v | West Indies |
| 476/8d (162 overs); Mahela Jayawardene 136 (234); Jerome Taylor 4/110 (33 overs) | | 280 (111.5 overs); Ramnaresh Sarwan 80 (199); Chaminda Vaas 3/48 (25 overs) |
| 240/7d (57 overs); Malinda Warnapura 62 (91); Sulieman Benn 3/59 (13 overs) | | 315 (106.2 overs); Dwayne Bravo 83 (169); Chaminda Vaas 5/61 (22.2 overs) |

Sri Lanka won by 121 runs
Providence Stadium, Georgetown, Guyana
Umpires: Billy Bowden (NZ) and Simon Taufel (Aus)
Player of the match: Chaminda Vaas (SL)

- Sri Lanka won the toss and elected to bat.
- Sulieman Benn (WI) made his Test debut.
- This was Sri Lanka's first win in the Caribbean in Tests.

=== Second Test ===
3–7 April
Scorecard

| Sri Lanka | v | West Indies |
| 278 (64.5 overs); Chamara Silva 76 (108); Fidel Edwards 4/84 (18 overs) | | 294 (76.2 overs); Ramnaresh Sarwan 57 (86); Muttiah Muralitharan 5/79 (29.2 overs) |
| 268 (75.1 overs); Thilan Samaraweera 125 (199); Jerome Taylor 4/52 (15.1 overs) | | 254/4 (68.3 overs); Ramnaresh Sarwan 102 (172); Chaminda Vaas 2/52 (17 overs) |

West Indies won by 6 wickets
Queen's Park Oval, Port-of-Spain, Trinidad
Umpires: Billy Bowden (NZ) and Simon Taufel (Aus)
Player of the match: Ramnaresh Sarwan (WI)

- Part of day 1 was washed out.

== ODI series ==
=== First ODI ===
10 April
Scorecard

| Sri Lanka; 235/7 (50 overs) | v | West Indies; 236/9 (50 overs) |
| Chamara Kapugedera 95 (117); Dwayne Bravo 4/32 (10 overs) | | Shivnarine Chanderpaul 62* (63); Ajantha Mendis 3/39 (10 overs) |

West Indies won by 1 wicket
Queen's Park Oval, Port-of-Spain, Trinidad
Umpires: Clyde Duncan (WI) and Simon Taufel (Aus)
Player of the match: Dwayne Bravo (WI)

- West Indies won the toss and elected to field.
- Sulieman Benn (WI), and Mahela Udawatte and Ajantha Mendis (SL) made their ODI debuts.

=== Second ODI ===
12 April
Scorecard

| Sri Lanka; 112/5 (30.3 overs) | v | West Indies; 125/3 (20.3/25 overs) |
| Upul Tharanga 40 (82); Chris Gayle 2/6 (1.3 overs) | | Marlon Samuels 54* (49); Nuwan Kulasekara 3/28 (5 overs) |

West Indies won by 7 wickets (D/L)
Queen's Park Oval, Port-of-Spain, Trinidad
Umpires: Clyde Duncan (WI) and Simon Taufel (Aus)
Player of the match: Shivnarine Chanderpaul (WI)

- West Indies won the toss and elected to field.
- Rain delays reduced Sri Lanka's innings to 30.3 overs and set a revised target for West Indies of 125 from 25 overs.

=== Third ODI ===
15 April
Scorecard

| Sri Lanka; 257/8 (50 overs) | v | West Indies; 81/2 (18.2 overs) |
| Mahela Udawatte 73 (121); Chris Gayle 2/41 (10 overs) | | Sewnarine Chattergoon 46 (53); Thilan Thushara 1/12 (5.2 overs) |

No result
Beausejour Stadium, Gros Islet, St Lucia
Umpires: Clyde Duncan (WI) and Simon Taufel (Aus)

- West Indies won the toss and elected to field.
- Rain in the second innings forced the match to be abandoned.
- Thilan Thushara (SL) made his ODI debut.
