= 2007–08 Euroleague Top 16 Group F =

Standings and results for Group F of the Top 16 phase of the 2007–08 Euroleague basketball tournament.

Key to colors
Top two places in each group advance to quarterfinals
Eliminated from contention

== Standings ==
	Team	Pld	W	L	PF	PA	Diff
1.	(Israel) Maccabi Tel Aviv	6	4	2	516	496	+20
2.	(Greece) Olympiacos	6	4	2	443	436	+7
3.	(Spain) Real Madrid	6	3	3	489	493	−4
4.	(Lithuania) Žalgiris Kaunas	6	1	5	457	480	−23

- Maccabi win the group on the second tiebreaker of head-to-head point differential against Olympiacos.

== Fixtures/results ==
All times given below are in Central European Time

=== Game 1 ===
February 14, 2008

February 14
21:45

(Report)

Olympiacos (Greece)	67–75	(Israel) Maccabi Tel Aviv
Scoring by quarter: 17-16, 13-13, 16-29, 21-17
Pts: Greer 26; Rebs: Mavrokefalidis 11; Asts: Greer 5		Pts: Halperin, Morris 16; Rebs: Morris 11; Asts: Halperin 6

Peace and Friendship Stadium, Athens
Attendance: 6,500

February 14
21:45

(Report)

Real Madrid (Spain)	88–85	(Lithuania) Žalgiris Kaunas
Scoring by quarter: 22-16, 21-23, 16-20, 29-26
Pts: Reyes, Bullock 17; Rebs: Reyes 7 Asts: López 5		Pts: Mačiulis 21; Rebs: Mačiulis 5 Asts: Collins 9

Palacio Vistalegre, Madrid
Attendance: 7,500

=== Game 2 ===
February 21, 2008

February 21
20:45

(Report)

Žalgiris Kaunas (Lithuania)	101–82	(Israel) Maccabi Tel Aviv
Scoring by quarter: 21-26, 27-22, 31-14, 22-20
Pts: Mačiulis 22; Rebs: N'Diaye 12; Asts: Collins 7		Pts: Batista 25; Rebs: Batista 13; Asts: Morris 3

Kaunas Sports Hall, Kaunas
Attendance: 5,000

February 21
21:45

(Report)

Real Madrid (Spain)	80–70	(Greece) Olympiacos
Scoring by quarter: 27-14, 18-21, 17-18, 18-17
Pts: Mumbrú 16; Rebs: Sekulić 5 Asts: Bullock, Smith 3		Pts: Greer 15; Rebs: Tsakalidis 4 Asts: Blakney 4

Palacio Vistalegre, Madrid
Attendance: 9,700

=== Game 3 ===
February 27–28, 2008

February 27
20:45

(Report)

Olympiacos (Greece)	86–84 (OT)	(Lithuania) Žalgiris Kaunas
Scoring by quarter: 20-22, 19-16, 16-18, 17-16, Overtime: 14-12
Pts: Greer 22; Rebs: Jackson 11; Asts: Teodosić 5		Pts: Collins 19; Rebs: N'Diaye 9 Asts: Collins 3

Peace and Friendship Stadium, Athens
Attendance: 3,000

February 28
20:50

(Report)

Maccabi Tel Aviv (Israel)	94–75	(Spain) Real Madrid
Scoring by quarter: 25-24, 25-13, 20-13, 24-25
Pts: Bynum 22; Rebs: Morris 15; Asts: Bynum, Vujčić 5		Pts: Reyes 16; Rebs: Hervelle 8 Asts: Tunçeri 7

Nokia Arena, Tel Aviv
Attendance: 10,500

=== Game 4 ===
March 6, 2008

March 6
20:15

(Report)

Žalgiris Kaunas (Lithuania)	69–83	(Spain) Real Madrid
Scoring by quarter: 14-14, 16-30, 23-21, 16-18
Pts: Popović 18; Rebs: Jankūnas 9 Asts: Collins 8		Pts: Reyes 18; Rebs: Hervelle 8 Asts: Tunçeri 3

Kaunas Sports Hall, Kaunas
Attendance: 5,000

March 6
20:50

(Report)

Maccabi Tel Aviv (Israel)	82–87	(Greece) Olympiacos
Scoring by quarter: 25-21, 25-23, 21-17, 11-26
Pts: Bluthenthal 19; Rebs: Morris 10; Asts: Cummings 7		Pts: Greer 27; Rebs: Bourousis 6 Asts: Greer 6

Nokia Arena, Tel Aviv
Attendance: 11,000

=== Game 5 ===
March 13, 2008

March 13
19:15 CET

(Report)

Žalgiris Kaunas (Lithuania)	52–61	(Greece) Olympiacos
Scoring by quarter: 9-13, 19-14, 15-12, 9-22
Pts: Mačiulis 10; Rebs: Jankunas 10; Asts: Collins 5		Pts: Greer 14; Rebs: Bourousis 8 Asts: Blakney 4

Kaunas Sports Hall, Kaunas
Attendance: 5,000

March 13
20:45

(Report)

Real Madrid (Spain)	100–103 (OT)	(Israel) Maccabi Tel Aviv
Scoring by quarter: 23-19, 23-21, 24-31, 19-18, Overtime: 11-14
Pts: Reyes 21; Rebs: Reyes, Hervelle 11; Asts: Bullock 7		Pts: Morris 23; Rebs: Morris 13; Asts: Bynum 6

Palacio Vistalegre, Madrid
Attendance: 13,300

=== Game 6 ===
March 20, 2008

March 20
19:00

(Report)

Olympiacos (Greece)	72–63	(Spain) Real Madrid
Scoring by quarter: 19-18, 14-11, 16-18, 23-16
Pts: Panayiotis Vasilopoulos 14; Rebs: Panayiotis Vasilopoulos 6 Asts: Lynn Greer 3		Pts: Raül López 16; Rebs: Pelekanos, Hervelle 6 Asts: Raül López 4

Peace and Friendship Stadium, Athens
Attendance: 12,000

March 20
19:00

(Report)

Maccabi Tel Aviv (Israel)	80–66	(Lithuania) Žalgiris Kaunas
Scoring by quarter: 24-20, 18-15, 18-11, 20-20
Pts: Yotam Halperin 17; Rebs: Terence Morris 7 Asts: Yotam Halperin 8		Pts: Marcus Brown 16; Rebs: Mamadou N'Diaye 6 Asts: DeJuan Collins 6

Nokia Arena, Tel Aviv
Attendance: 11,000
