= 2007–08 Euroleague Top 16 Group D =

Standings and results for Group D of the Top 16 phase of the 2007–08 Euroleague basketball tournament.

Main page: 2007–08 Euroleague

Key to colors
Top two places in each group advance to quarterfinals
Eliminated from contention

== Standings ==
	Team	Pld	W	L	PF	PA	Diff
1.	(Italy) Montepaschi Siena	6	4	2	465	427	+42
2.	(Serbia) Partizan Belgrade	6	4	2	440	230	+10
3.	(Greece) Panathinaikos	6	3	3	430	446	−7
4.	(Turkey) Efes Pilsen	6	1	5	426	458	−32

- Montepaschi win the group on the second tiebreaker of head-to-head point difference.

== Fixtures and results ==
All times given below are in Central European Time.

=== Game 1 ===
February 13–14, 2008

February 13
19:15

(Report)

Efes Pilsen (Turkey)	74–64	(Greece) Panathinaikos
Scoring by quarter: 17-21, 29-14, 17-13, 11-16
Pts: Nicholas 29; Rebs: Gönlüm 7 Asts: Arslan 6		Pts: Batiste, Jasikevičius 12; Rebs: Diamantidis 7 Asts: Diamantidis 4

Abdi İpekçi Arena, Istanbul
Attendance: 5,000

February 14
20:30

(Report)

Montepaschi Siena (Italy)	71–54	(Serbia) Partizan Belgrade
Scoring by quarter: 16-9, 17-18, 15-9, 23-18
Pts: Lavrinovič 18; Rebs: Stonerook 5 Asts: McIntyre 5		Pts: Peković 13; Rebs: Peković 8 Asts: Palacio, Tripković, Veličković 2

Palasport Mens Sana, Siena
Attendance: 4,613

=== Game 2 ===
February 20, 2008

February 20
19:15

(Report)

Efes Pilsen (Turkey)	76–79 (OT)	(Italy) Montepaschi Siena
Scoring by quarter: 13-12, 17-16, 14-21, 25-20, Overtime: 7-10
Pts: Kurtoğlu 20; Rebs: Kurtoğlu, Nicholas 7 Asts: Penn 5		Pts: Thornton 18; Rebs: Eze 7 Asts: McIntyre 8

Abdi İpekçi Arena, Istanbul
Attendance: 3,000

February 20
19:45

(Report)

Panathinaikos (Greece)	67–65	(Serbia) Partizan Belgrade
Scoring by quarter: 21-23, 13-17, 15-16, 18-9
Pts: Spanoulis 20; Rebs: Batiste 12; Asts: Spanoulis 3		Pts: Kecman 13; Rebs: Vitkovac 7 Asts: Peković 3

Olympic Indoor Hall, Athens
Attendance: 10,500

=== Game 3 ===
February 27–28, 2008

February 27
20:45

(Report)

Montepaschi Siena (Italy)	84–75	(Greece) Panathinaikos
Scoring by quarter: 22-19, 21-21, 22-19, 19-16
Pts: Thornton 23; Rebs: Lavrinovič, Sato, Stonerook 4 Asts: McIntyre 6		Pts: Batiste 20; Rebs: Batiste, Diamantidis 6 Asts: Diamantidis 4

Palasport Mens Sana, Siena
Attendance: 6,130

February 28
20:45

(Report)

Partizan Belgrade (Serbia)	78–65	(Turkey) Efes Pilsen
Scoring by quarter: 19-20, 20-8, 13-15, 26-22
Pts: Peković 20; Rebs: Kecman 8 Asts: Veličković 3		Pts: Gregory 19; Rebs: Gönlüm 7 Asts: Gönlüm, Kurtoğlu, Penn 3

Pionir Hall, Belgrade
Attendance: 6,538

=== Game 4 ===
March 5–6, 2008

March 5
18:45

(Report)

Partizan Belgrade (Serbia)	78–75	(Italy) Montepaschi Siena
Scoring by quarter: 16-13, 16-21, 15-20, 31-21
Pts: Palacio 26; Rebs: Peković 7 Asts: Veličković 4		Pts: McIntyre, Eze 16; Rebs: Eze 5 Asts: McIntyre 4

Pionir Hall, Belgrade
Attendance: 6,528

March 6
20:45

(Report)

Panathinaikos (Greece)	74–65	(Turkey) Efes Pilsen
Scoring by quarter: 15-20, 16-18, 23-14, 20-13
Pts: Michael Batiste 20; Rebs: Batiste, Diamantidis 6 Asts: Dimitris Diamantidis 5		Pts: Andre Hutson 21; Rebs: Andre Hutson 8 Asts: Ermal Kurtoğlu 4

Olympic Indoor Hall, Athens
Attendance: 13,500

=== Game 5 ===
March 13, 2008

March 13
19:15

(Report)

Efes Pilsen (Turkey)	79–83	(Serbia) Partizan Belgrade
Scoring by quarter: 19-24, 10-14, 18-30, 32-15
Pts: Scoonie Penn 33; Rebs: Kerem Gönlüm 13; Asts: Scoonie Penn 4		Pts: Nikola Peković 22; Rebs: Dušan Kecman 7 Asts: Three players with 3

Abdi İpekçi Arena, Istanbul
Attendance: 4,500

March 13
20:45

(Report)

Panathinaikos (Greece)	77–76	(Italy) Montepaschi Siena
Scoring by quarter: 17-27, 26-18, 19-16, 15-15
Pts: Michael Batiste 18; Rebs: Dimitris Diamantidis 7 Asts: Šarūnas Jasikevičius 5		Pts: Bootsy Thornton 19; Rebs: Thornton, Lavrinovič 7 Asts: Terrell McIntyre 5

Olympic Indoor Hall, Athens
Attendance: 17,500

=== Game 6 ===
March 19, 2008

March 19
20:15

(Report)

Montepaschi Siena (Italy)	80–67	(Turkey) Efes Pilsen
Scoring by quarter: 20-15, 24-15, 15-13, 21-24
Pts: Romain Sato 25; Rebs: Shaun Stonerook 7 Asts: Terrell McIntyre 7		Pts: Andre Hutson 16; Rebs: Kerem Gönlüm 8 Asts: Scoonie Penn 5

Palasport Mens Sana, Siena
Attendance: 5,373

March 19
20:15

(Report)

Partizan Belgrade (Serbia)	82–73	(Greece) Panathinaikos
Scoring by quarter: 26-17, 16-20, 18-18, 22-18
Pts: Milt Palacio 24; Rebs: Dušan Kecman 13; Asts: Dušan Kecman 5		Pts: Šarūnas Jasikevičius 20; Rebs: Dimitris Diamantidis 5 Asts: Spanoulis, Diamantidis 3

Pionir Hall, Belgrade
Attendance: 7,028
