= 2007–08 Euroleague Top 16 Group E =

Standings and results for Group E of the Top 16 phase of the 2007–08 Euroleague basketball tournament.

Main page: 2007–08 Euroleague

Key to colors
Top two places in each group advance to quarterfinals
Eliminated from contention

== Standings ==
	Team	Pld	W	L	PF	PA	Diff
1.	(Spain) TAU Cerámica	6	5	1	510	467	+43
2.	(Turkey) Fenerbahçe	6	3	3	493	488	+5
3.	(Lithuania) Lietuvos Rytas Vilnius	6	2	4	506	507	−1
4.	(Greece) Aris Thessaloniki	6	2	4	448	495	−47

== Fixtures and results ==
All times given below are in Central European Time.

=== Game 1 ===
February 13–14, 2008

February 13
19:15

(Report)

Lietuvos Rytas (Lithuania)	81–84	(Spain) TAU Cerámica
Scoring by quarter: 18-18, 15-26, 24-21, 24-19
Pts: Price 23; Rebs: Petravičius 10; Asts: Price 4		Pts: Splitter 17; Rebs: Mickeal 6 Asts: Prigioni, Vidal 3

Siemens Arena, Vilnius
Attendance: 11,000

February 14
19:45

(Report)

Aris Thessaloniki (Greece)	88–96	(Turkey) Fenerbahçe
Scoring by quarter: 21-29, 22-21, 17-20, 28-26
Pts: Wright, Massey 17; Rebs: Massey 13; Asts: Washington 5		Pts: Solomon 23; Rebs: Savaş 6 Asts: Kaan 3

Alexandrio Melathron, Thessaloniki
Attendance: 5,000

=== Game 2 ===
February 20, 2008

February 20
19:15

(Report)

Lietuvos Rytas (Lithuania)	89–74	(Greece) Aris Thessaloniki
Scoring by quarter: 27-11, 22-20, 16-18, 24-25
Pts: Eidson, Lukauskis 18; Rebs: Bajramović 7 Asts: Eidson, Price 5		Pts: Savaş 20; Rebs: Aşık 7 Asts: Preldžič 3

Siemens Arena, Vilnius
Attendance: 9,875

February 20
20:30

(Report)

TAU Cerámica (Spain)	103–84	(Turkey) Fenerbahçe
Scoring by quarter: 25-17, 25-21, 24-18, 29-28
Pts: Rakočević, Vidal 14; Rebs: McDonald, Mickeal 7 Asts: Prigioni 7		Pts: Savaş 20; Rebs: Aşık 7 Asts: Preldžič 3

Fernando Buesa Arena, Vitoria-Gasteiz
Attendance: 7,200

=== Game 3 ===
February 28, 2008

February 28
19:00

(Report)

Fenerbahçe (Turkey)	95–91 (OT) (OT)	(Lithuania) Lietuvos Rytas
Scoring by quarter: 25-27, 20-7, 10-29, 24-16, Overtime: 16-12
Pts: Will Solomon 27; Rebs: Kinsey, Aşık 7 Asts: Will Solomon 7		Pts: Kenan Bajramović 22; Rebs: Kenan Bajramović 9 Asts: Chuck Eidson 5

Abdi İpekçi Arena, Istanbul
Attendance: 1,500

February 28
20:45

(Report)

Aris Thessaloniki (Greece)	69–87	(Spain) TAU Cerámica
Scoring by quarter: 14-18, 13-27, 21-21, 21-21
Pts: Bracey Wright 24; Rebs: Jeremiah Massey 8 Asts: Kalaitzis, Massey 7		Pts: Vidal, Splitter 16; Rebs: Will McDonald 9 Asts: Pablo Prigioni 7

Alexandrio Melathron, Thessaloniki
Attendance: 2,500

=== Game 4 ===
March 5, 2008

March 5
19:15

(Report)

Fenerbahçe (Turkey)	59–60	(Greece) Aris Thessaloniki
Scoring by quarter: 15-22, 17-12, 13-16, 14-10
Pts: Solomon, Aşık 13; Rebs: Ömer Aşık 11; Asts: James White 2		Pts: Jeremiah Massey 18; Rebs: Jeremiah Massey 8 Asts: Kalaitzis, Washington 3

Abdi İpekçi Arena, Istanbul
Attendance: 11,000

March 5
20:30

(Report)

TAU Cerámica (Spain)	87–84	(Lithuania) Lietuvos Rytas
Scoring by quarter: 28-26, 17-22, 27-19, 15-17
Pts: Prigioni, Planinić 16; Rebs: Zoran Planinić 6 Asts: Zoran Planinić 8		Pts: Kenan Bajramović 18; Rebs: Jackson Vroman 7 Asts: Mindaugas Lukauskis 8

Fernando Buesa Arena, Vitoria-Gasteiz
Attendance: 8,400

=== Game 5 ===
March 12, 2008

March 12
19:15

(Report)

Lietuvos Rytas (Lithuania)	87–84	(Turkey) Fenerbahçe
Scoring by quarter: 18-26, 20-20, 25-24, 24-14
Pts: Hollis Price 22; Rebs: Kenan Bajramović 7 Asts: Eidson, Bajramović 3		Pts: Tarence Kinsey 20; Rebs: Erden, Aşık 5 Asts: Will Solomon 6

Siemens Arena, Vilnius
Attendance: 11,000

March 12
20:30

(Report)

TAU Cerámica (Spain)	90–74	(Greece) Aris Thessaloniki
Scoring by quarter: 22-24, 21-13, 20-18, 27-19
Pts: Tiago Splitter 18; Rebs: Pablo Prigioni 5 Asts: Zoran Planinić 5		Pts: Jeremiah Massey 26; Rebs: Jeremiah Massey 7 Asts: Giorgos Kalaitzis 6

Fernando Buesa Arena, Vitoria-Gasteiz
Attendance: 7,400

=== Game 6 ===
March 19, 2008

March 19
20:15

(Report)

Fenerbahçe (Turkey)	75–59	(Spain) TAU Cerámica
Scoring by quarter: 30-17, 13-13, 16-20, 16-9
Pts: Will Solomon 28; Rebs: Tarence Kinsey 6 Asts: Will Solomon 4		Pts: Tiago Splitter 21; Rebs: Tiago Splitter 7 Asts: Zoran Planinić 4

Abdi İpekçi Arena, Istanbul
Attendance: 10,000

March 19
20:15

(Report)

Aris Thessaloniki (Greece)	83–74	(Lithuania) Lietuvos Rytas
Scoring by quarter: 18-19, 22-17, 17-12, 26-26
Pts: Jeremiah Massey 28; Rebs: Jeremiah Massey 12; Asts: Darius Washington 4		Pts: Kenan Bajramović 14; Rebs: Kenan Bajramović 10; Asts: Hollis Price 3

Alexandrio Melathron, Thessaloniki
Attendance: 2,000
