= August 2011 in sports =

<<	August 2011					>>
Su	Mo	Tu	We	Th	Fr	Sa
	1	2	3	4	5	6
7	8	9	10	11	12	13
14	15	16	17	18	19	20
21	22	23	24	25	26	27
28	29	30	31
Sports

This list shows notable sports-related deaths, events, and notable outcomes that occurred in August of 2011.

== Deaths in August ==
- 15: Rick Rypien
- 17: Pierre Quinon
- 28: Len Ganley

== Current sporting seasons ==
=== Australian rules football 2011 ===
- Australian Football League

=== Auto racing 2011 ===
- Formula One
- Sprint Cup
- Nationwide Series
- Camping World Truck Series
- IRL IndyCar Series
- World Rally Championship
- WTCC
- V8 Supercar
- Formula Two
- GP2 Series
- GP3 Series
- American Le Mans
- Le Mans Series
- Rolex Sports Car Series
- FIA GT1 World Championship
- Auto GP
- World Series by Renault
- Deutsche Tourenwagen Masters
- Super GT

=== Baseball 2011 ===
- Major League Baseball
- Nippon Professional Baseball

=== Basketball 2011 ===
- WNBA
- Philippines collegiate:
  - NCAA
  - UAAP

=== Canadian football 2011 ===
- Canadian Football League

=== Cricket 2011 ===
- England:
  - County Championship
  - Clydesdale Bank 40
  - Friends Life t20

=== Football (soccer) 2011 ===
National teams competitions

- 2014 FIFA World Cup qualification
- UEFA Euro 2012 qualifying
- 2012 Africa Cup of Nations qualification
- UEFA Women's Euro 2013 qualifying

International clubs competitions

- UEFA (Europe) Champions League
- UEFA Europa League
- UEFA Women's Champions League
- Copa Sudamericana
- AFC (Asia) Champions League
- AFC Cup
- CAF (Africa) Champions League
- CAF Confederation Cup
- CONCACAF (North & Central America) Champions League

Domestic (national) competitions

- Argentina
- Brazil
- England
- France
- Germany
- Italy
- Japan
- Norway
- Portugal
- Russia
- Scotland
- Spain
- Major League Soccer (USA & Canada)
- Women's Professional Soccer (USA)

=== Golf 2011 ===
- PGA Tour
- European Tour
- LPGA Tour
- Champions Tour

=== Motorcycle racing 2011 ===
- Moto GP
- Superbike World Championship
- Supersport World Championship

=== Rugby league 2011 ===
- Super League
- NRL

=== Rugby union 2011 ===
- Top 14
- Currie Cup
- ITM Cup

=== Tennis 2011 ===
- ATP World Tour
- WTA Tour

=== Volleyball 2011 ===
National teams competitions

- World Grand Prix

=== Winter sports ===
- ISU Junior Grand Prix

== Days of the month ==
=== August 31, 2011 (Wednesday) ===
==== Athletics ====
- World Championships in Daegu, South Korea:
  - Women's 20 kilometres walk: (gold) Olga Kaniskina (RUS) 1:29:42 (silver) Liu Hong (CHN) 1:30:00 (bronze) Anisya Kirdyapkina (RUS) 1:30:12
    - Kaniskina wins the event for the third successive time.

==== Basketball ====
- EuroBasket in Lithuania:
  - Group A in Panevėžys:
    - Spain 83–78 Poland
    - Turkey 79–56 Portugal
    - Lithuania 80–69 Great Britain
  - Group B in Šiauliai:
    - Serbia 80–68 Italy
    - France 89–78 Latvia
    - Germany 91–64 Israel
  - Group C in Alytus:
    - Montenegro 70–65 (OT) Macedonia
    - Greece 76–67 Bosnia and Herzegovina
    - Croatia 84–79 Finland
  - Group D in Klaipėda:
    - Belgium 59–81 Georgia
    - Slovenia 67–59 Bulgaria
    - Russia 73–64 Ukraine
- FIBA Americas Championship in Mar del Plata, Argentina:
  - Group A:
    - Venezuela 89–92 Dominican Republic
    - Canada 57–69 Brazil
      - Standings: Dominican Republic, Brazil 4 points (2 games), Venezuela 2 (2), Cuba, Canada 1 (1).
  - Group B:
    - Puerto Rico 101–55 Paraguay
    - Argentina 86–51 Uruguay
      - Standings: Puerto Rico, Argentina 4 points (2 games), Paraguay 2 (2), Panama, Uruguay 1 (1).

==== Cricket ====
- Australia in Sri Lanka:
  - 1st Test in Galle, day 1: Australia 273 (86.4 overs); Sri Lanka.
- India in England:
  - Only T20 in Manchester: India 165 (19.4/20 overs); England 169/4 (19.3/20 overs). **England win by 6 wickets**.

==== Cycling ====
- Grand Tours:
  - Vuelta a España, Stage 11: (gold) David Moncoutié (FRA) (Cofidis) 4h 38' 00" (silver) Beñat Intxausti (ESP) (Movistar Team) + 1' 18" (bronze) Luis León Sánchez (ESP) (Rabobank) + 1' 18"
    - General classification (after stage 11): (1) Bradley Wiggins (GBR) (Team Sky) 42h 50' 41" (2) Chris Froome (GBR) (Team Sky) + 7" (3) Vincenzo Nibali (ITA) (Liquigas–Cannondale) + 11"

==== Football (soccer) ====
- Copa Sudamericana Second stage, first leg: Lanús (Argentina) 2–2 (Argentina) Godoy Cruz

==== Tennis ====
- Grand Slams:
  - US Open in New York City, United States, day 3:
    - Men's singles, first round:
      - **Andy Murray** (GBR) [4] def. Somdev Devvarman (IND) 7–6(5), 6–2, 6–3
      - **Julien Benneteau** (FRA) def. Nicolás Almagro (ESP) [10] 6–2, 6–4, 6–3
    - Women's singles, second round:
      - **Vera Zvonareva** (RUS) [2] def. Kateryna Bondarenko (UKR) 7–5, 3–6, 6–3
      - **Maria Sharapova** (RUS) [3] def. Anastasiya Yakimova (BLR) 6–1, 6–1
      - **Christina McHale** (USA) def. Marion Bartoli (FRA) [8] 7–6(2), 6–2
      - **Samantha Stosur** (AUS) [9] def. CoCo Vandeweghe (USA) 6–3, 6–4

=== August 30, 2011 (Tuesday) ===
==== Athletics ====
- World Championships in Daegu, South Korea:
  - Women's pole vault: (gold) Fabiana Murer (BRA) 4.85m (silver) Martina Strutz (GER) 4.80m (bronze) Svetlana Feofanova (RUS) 4.75m
  - Men's discus throw: (gold) Robert Harting (GER) 68.97m (silver) Gerd Kanter (EST) 66.95m (bronze) Ehsan Haddadi (IRI) 66.08m
    - Harting wins the event for the second successive time.
  - Women's heptathlon: (gold) Tatyana Chernova (RUS) 6880 points (silver) Jessica Ennis (GBR) 6751 (bronze) Jennifer Oeser (GER) 6572
  - Men's 800 metres: (gold) David Rudisha (KEN) 1:43.91 (silver) Abubaker Kaki Khamis (SUD) 1:44.41 (bronze) Yuriy Borzakovskiy (RUS) 1:44.49
  - Women's 3000 metres steeplechase: (gold) Yuliya Zaripova (RUS) 9:07.03 (silver) Habiba Ghribi (TUN) 9:11.97 (bronze) Milcah Chemos Cheywa (KEN) 9:17.16
  - Men's 400 metres: (gold) Kirani James (GRN) 44.60 (silver) LaShawn Merritt (USA) 44.63 (bronze) Kevin Borlée (BEL) 44.90

==== Basketball ====
- FIBA Americas Championship in Mar del Plata, Argentina:
  - Group A:
    - Dominican Republic 90–60 Cuba
    - Brazil 92–83 Venezuela
  - Group B:
    - Paraguay 52–84 Argentina
    - Panama 66–99 Puerto Rico

==== Football (soccer) ====
- Copa Sudamericana Second stage, first leg:
  - Arsenal (Argentina) 2–0 (Argentina) Estudiantes
  - Nacional (Paraguay) 1–1 (Bolivia) Aurora

==== Tennis ====
- Grand Slams:
  - US Open in New York City, United States, day 2:
    - Men's singles, first round:
      - **Novak Djokovic** (SRB) [1] def. Conor Niland (IRL) 6–0, 5–1 ret.
      - **Rafael Nadal** (ESP) [2] def. Andrey Golubev (KAZ) 6–3, 7–6(1), 7–5
      - **David Ferrer** (ESP) [5] def. Igor Andreev (RUS) 2–6, 6–3, 6–0, 6–4
    - Women's singles, first round:
      - **Caroline Wozniacki** (DEN) [1] def. Nuria Llagostera Vives (ESP) 6–3, 6–1
      - **Victoria Azarenka** (BLR) [4] def. Johanna Larsson (SWE) 6–1, 6–3
      - **Simona Halep** (ROU) def. Li Na (CHN) [6] 6–2, 7–5
      - **Francesca Schiavone** (ITA) [7] def. Galina Voskoboeva (KAZ) 6–3, 1–6, 6–4
      - **Andrea Petkovic** (GER) [10] def. Ekaterina Bychkova (RUS) 6–2, 6–2

=== August 29, 2011 (Monday) ===
==== Athletics ====
- World Championships in Daegu, South Korea:
  - Men's hammer throw: (gold) Koji Murofushi (JPN) 81.24m (silver) Krisztián Pars (HUN) 81.18m (bronze) Primož Kozmus (SLO) 79.39m
  - Men's pole vault: (gold) Paweł Wojciechowski (POL) 5.90m (silver) Lázaro Borges (CUB) 5.90m (bronze) Renaud Lavillenie (FRA) 5.85m
  - Women's shot put: (gold) Valerie Adams (NZL) 21.24m (CR) (silver) Nadzeya Astapchuk (BLR) 20.05m (bronze) Jillian Camarena-Williams (USA) 20.02m
    - Adams wins the event for the third successive time.
  - Women's 400 metres: (gold) Amantle Montsho (BOT) 49.56 (silver) Allyson Felix (USA) 49.59 (bronze) Anastasiya Kapachinskaya (RUS) 50.24
  - Men's 110 metres hurdles: (gold) Jason Richardson (USA) 13.16 (silver) Liu Xiang (CHN) 13.27 (bronze) Andy Turner (GBR) 13.44
    - Dayron Robles (CUB) initially wins the race, but is disqualified for obstruction of Liu over the last hurdle.
  - Women's 100 metres: (gold) Carmelita Jeter (USA) 10.90 (silver) Veronica Campbell Brown (JAM) 10.97 (bronze) Kelly-Ann Baptiste (TRI) 10.98
    - Jeter wins her second world championship title.
  - Women's heptathlon (standings after 4 events): (1) Jessica Ennis (GBR) 4078 points (2) Tatyana Chernova (RUS) 3927 (3) Hyleas Fountain (USA) 3887

==== Cycling ====
- Grand Tours:
  - Vuelta a España, Stage 10: (gold) Tony Martin (GER) (HTC–Highroad) 55' 54" (silver) Chris Froome (GBR) (Team Sky) + 59" (bronze) Bradley Wiggins (GBR) (Team Sky) + 1' 22"
    - General classification (after stage 10): (1) Froome 38h 09' 13" (2) Jakob Fuglsang (DEN) (Leopard Trek) + 12" (3) Wiggins + 20"

==== Tennis ====
- Grand Slams:
  - US Open in New York City, United States, day 1:
    - Men's singles, first round:
      - **Roger Federer** (SUI) [3] def. Santiago Giraldo (COL) 6–4 6–3 6–2
      - **Gaël Monfils** (FRA) [7] def. Grigor Dimitrov (BUL) 7–6(4) 6–3 6–4
      - **Mardy Fish** (USA) [8] def. Tobias Kamke (GER) 6–2 6–2 6–1
      - **Tomáš Berdych** (CZE) [9] def. Romain Jouan (FRA) 6–2 7–6(4) 6–1
    - Women's singles, first round:
      - **Vera Zvonareva** (RUS) [2] def. Stéphanie Foretz Gacon (FRA) 6–3 6–0
      - **Maria Sharapova** (RUS) [3] def. Heather Watson (GBR) 3–6 7–5 6–3
      - **Alexandra Dulgheru** (ROM) def. Petra Kvitová (CZE) [5] 7–6(3) 6–3
      - **Marion Bartoli** (FRA) [8] def. Alexandra Panova (RUS) 7–5 6–3
      - **Samantha Stosur** (AUS) [9] def. Sofia Arvidsson (SWE) 6–2 6–3

==== Surfing ====
- Men's World Tour:
  - Billabong Pro Teahupoo in Teahupoo, Tahiti, French Polynesia: (1) Kelly Slater (USA) (2) Owen Wright (AUS) (3) Josh Kerr (AUS) & Travis Logie (RSA)
    - Standings (after 5 of 11 events): (1) Slater 26,950 points (2) Smith 26,500 (3) Joel Parkinson (AUS) 26,200

=== August 28, 2011 (Sunday) ===
==== Athletics ====
- World Championships in Daegu, South Korea:
  - Men's 20 kilometres walk: (gold) Valeriy Borchin (RUS) 1:19:56 (silver) Vladimir Kanaykin (RUS) 1:20:27 (bronze) Luis Fernando López (COL) 1:20:38
    - Borchin wins the event for the second successive time.
  - Women's long jump: (gold) Brittney Reese (USA) 6.82m (silver) Olga Kucherenko (RUS) 6.77m (bronze) Ineta Radēviča (LAT) 6.76m
    - Reese wins the event for the second successive time.
  - Women's discus throw: (gold) Li Yanfeng (CHN) 66.52m (silver) Nadine Müller (GER) 65.97m (bronze) Yarelys Barrios (CUB) 65.73m
  - Men's 10,000 metres: (gold) Ibrahim Jeilan (ETH) 27:13.81 (silver) Mo Farah (GBR) 27:14.07 (bronze) Imane Merga (ETH) 27:19.14
  - Men's decathlon: (gold) Trey Hardee (USA) 8607 points (silver) Ashton Eaton (USA) 8505 (bronze) Leonel Suárez (CUB) 8501
    - Hardee wins the event for the second successive time.
  - Men's 100 metres: (gold) Yohan Blake (JAM) 9.92 (silver) Walter Dix (USA) 10.08 (bronze) Kim Collins (SKN) 10.09
    - World record holder and defending world champion Usain Bolt (JAM) was disqualified from the final for a false start.

==== Auto racing ====
- Formula One:
  - Belgian Grand Prix in Spa, Belgium: (1) Sebastian Vettel (GER) (Red Bull–Renault) (2) Mark Webber (AUS) (Red Bull-Renault) (3) Jenson Button (GBR) (McLaren–Mercedes)
    - Drivers' championship standings (after 12 of 19 races): (1) Vettel 259 points (2) Webber 167 (3) Fernando Alonso (ESP) (Ferrari) 157
- IndyCar Series:
  - Indy Grand Prix of Sonoma in Sonoma, California (all Team Penske): (1) Will Power (AUS) (2) Hélio Castroneves (BRA) (3) Ryan Briscoe (AUS)
    - Drivers' championship standings (after 14 of 18 races): (1) Dario Franchitti (GBR) (Chip Ganassi Racing) 475 points (2) Power 449 (3) Scott Dixon (NZL) (Chip Ganassi Racing) 400

==== Basketball ====
- FIBA Africa Championship in Antananarivo, Madagascar:
  - Bronze medal game: (bronze) **Nigeria** 77–67 Ivory Coast
  - Final: (silver) Angola 56–67 (gold) **Tunisia**
    - Tunisia win the title for the first time, and qualify for the 2012 Olympics.
    - Angola and Nigeria qualify for the FIBA World Olympic Qualifying Tournament.
- FIBA Asia Championship for Women in Ōmura, Japan:
  - Bronze medal game: (bronze) **Japan** 83–56 Chinese Taipei
  - Final: (gold) **China** 65–62 (silver) South Korea
    - China win the title for the 11th time, and qualify for the 2012 Olympics.
    - Korea and Japan qualify for the FIBA World Olympic Qualifying Tournament.

==== Cycling ====
- Grand Tours:
  - Vuelta a España, Stage 9: (gold) Dan Martin (IRL) (Garmin–Cervélo) 4h 52' 14" (silver) Bauke Mollema (NED) (Rabobank) s.t. (bronze) Juan José Cobo (ESP) (Geox–TMC) + 3"
    - General classification (after stage 9): (1) Mollema 37h 11' 17"(2) Joaquim Rodríguez (ESP) (Team Katusha) + 1" (3) Vincenzo Nibali (ITA) (Liquigas–Cannondale) + 9"
- UCI World Tour:
  - GP Ouest-France: (gold) Grega Bole (SLO) (Lampre–ISD) 6h 32' 41" (silver) Simon Gerrans (AUS) (Team Sky) s.t. (bronze) Thomas Voeckler (FRA) (Team Europcar) s.t.
    - UCI World Tour standings (after 22 of 27 races): (1) Cadel Evans (AUS) (BMC Racing Team) 574 points (2) Philippe Gilbert (BEL) (Omega Pharma–Lotto) 568 (3) Alberto Contador (ESP) (Saxo Bank–SunGard) 471

==== Equestrianism ====
- European Eventing Championship in Luhmühlen, Germany:
  - individual: (gold) Michael Jung (GER) on Sam FBW (silver) Sandra Auffarth (GER) on Opgun Louvo (bronze) Frank Ostholt (GER) on Little Paint
  - team: (gold) Germany (Ingrid Klimke, Michael Jung, Sandra Auffarth, Andreas Dibowski) (silver) France (Donatien Schauly, Nicolas Touzaint, Stanislas de Zuchowicz, Pascal Leroy) (bronze) Great Britain (Mary King, Piggy French, William Fox-Pitt, Nicola Wilson)
- 2011 CHIO Rotterdam in Rotterdam, Netherlands (CSIO 5*):
  - Show jumping Grand Prix: (gold) Beezie Madden (USA) on Coral Reef Via Volo (silver) Jeroen Dubbeldam (NED) on Simon (bronze) Carsten-Otto Nagel (GER) on Corradina

==== Field hockey ====
- Men's EuroHockey Nations Championship in Mönchengladbach, Germany:
  - Bronze medal match: Belgium 1–2 (a.e.t.) (bronze) **England**
  - Final: (silver) Netherlands 2–4 (gold) **Germany**
    - Germany win the title for the seventh time.

==== Football (soccer) ====
- CAF Champions League Group stage Matchday 4:
  - Group A: Coton Sport (Cameroon) 2–0 (Sudan) Al-Hilal
    - Standings (after 4 matches): (Nigeria) Enyimba 8 points, Al-Hilal 7, Coton Sport 4, (Morocco) Raja Casablanca 2.
  - Group B: MC Alger (Algeria) 0–0 (Egypt) Al-Ahly
    - Standings (after 4 matches): (Tunisia) Espérance ST, (Morocco) Wydad Casablanca 6 points, Al-Ahly 5, MC Alger 2.
- CAF Confederation Cup Group stage Matchday 4:
  - Group A:
    - Kaduna United (Nigeria) 2–1 (Ivory Coast) ASEC Mimosas
    - Inter Luanda (Angola) 2–1 (Tunisia) Club Africain
      - Standings (after 4 matches): Inter Luanda 7 points, Club Africain, Kaduna United 5, ASEC Mimosas 4.

==== Golf ====
- European Tour:
  - Johnnie Walker Championship at Gleneagles in Auchterarder, Perth and Kinross, Scotland:
    - Winner: Thomas Bjørn (DEN) 277 (−11)^{PO}
      - Bjørn wins a five-way playoff for his second European Tour title of the season and 12th of his career.
- LPGA Tour:
  - CN Canadian Women's Open in Mirabel, Quebec:
    - Winner: Brittany Lincicome (USA) 275 (−13)
      - Lincicome wins her second LPGA Tour title of the season and fifth of her career.
- Champions Tour:
  - Boeing Classic in Snoqualmie, Washington:
    - Winner: Mark Calcavecchia (USA) 202 (−14)^{PO}
      - Calcavecchia defeats fellow American Russ Cochran in a playoff for his first Champions Tour title.
- Amateur events:
  - U.S. Amateur in Erin, Wisconsin:
    - Final: **Kelly Kraft** (USA) def. Patrick Cantlay (USA) 2 up

==== Judo ====
- World Championships in Paris, France:
  - Men's team: (gold) France (silver) Brazil (bronze) Japan & South Korea
  - Women's team: (gold) France (silver) Japan (bronze) Cuba & Germany

==== Motorcycle racing ====
- Moto GP:
  - Indianapolis Grand Prix in Indianapolis, United States (ESP unless stated):
    - MotoGP: (1) Casey Stoner (AUS) (Honda) (2) Dani Pedrosa (Honda) (3) Ben Spies (USA) (Yamaha)
      - Riders' championship standings (after 12 of 18 races): (1) Stoner 243 points (2) Jorge Lorenzo (Yamaha) 199 (3) Andrea Dovizioso (ITA) (Honda) 174
    - Moto2: (1) Marc Márquez (Suter) (2) Pol Espargaró (FTR) (3) Esteve Rabat (FTR)
      - Riders' championship standings (after 11 of 17 races): (1) Stefan Bradl (GER) (Kalex) 193 points (2) Márquez 165 (3) Andrea Iannone (ITA) (Suter) & Alex de Angelis (SMR) (Motobi) 96
    - 125cc: (1) Nicolás Terol (Aprilia) (2) Maverick Viñales (Aprilia) (3) Sandro Cortese (GER) (Aprilia)
      - Riders' championship standings (after 11 of 17 races): (1) Terol 191 points (2) Johann Zarco (FRA) (Derbi) 165 (3) Viñales 152

==== Snooker ====
- Players Tour Championship – Event 4: Paul Hunter Classic in Fürth, Germany:
  - Final: Mark Davis (ENG) 0–4 **Mark Selby** (ENG)
    - Selby wins his sixth professional title.
    - Order of Merit (after 4 of 12 events): (1) Ronnie O'Sullivan (ENG) 14,200 (2) Selby 12,200 (3) Judd Trump (ENG) 11,200

==== Volleyball ====
- FIVB World Grand Prix final round in Macau, China:
  - Bronze medal match: Russia 0–3 (bronze) **Serbia**
  - Final: (silver) Brazil 0–3 (gold) **United States**
    - The United States win the title for the second successive time and fourth time overall.
- FIVB Boys Youth World Championship in Bahía Blanca, Argentina:
  - Bronze medal match: (bronze) **Cuba** 3–0 France
  - Final: (silver) Spain 2–3 (gold) **Serbia**
    - Serbia win the title for the second successive time.

=== August 27, 2011 (Saturday) ===
==== Athletics ====
- World Championships in Daegu, South Korea (KEN unless stated):
  - Women's Marathon: (gold) Edna Kiplagat 2:28:43 (silver) Priscah Jeptoo 2:29:00 (bronze) Sharon Cherop 2:29:14
  - Women's 10,000 metres: (gold) Vivian Cheruiyot 30:48.98 (silver) Sally Kipyego 30:50.04 (bronze) Linet Masai 30:53.59
    - Cheruiyot wins her second world championship title.
  - Men's decathlon (standings after 5 events): (1) Ashton Eaton (USA) 4446 points (2) Trey Hardee (USA) 4393 (3) Oleksiy Kasyanov (UKR) 4310

==== Auto racing ====
- Sprint Cup Series:
  - Irwin Tools Night Race in Bristol, Tennessee: (1) (Michigan) Brad Keselowski (Dodge; Penske Racing) (2) (New Jersey) Martin Truex Jr. (Toyota; Michael Waltrip Racing) (3) (California) Jeff Gordon (Chevrolet; Hendrick Motorsports)
    - Drivers' championship standings (after 24 of 36 races): (1) (Nevada) Kyle Busch (Toyota; Joe Gibbs Racing) 830 points (4 wins) (2) (California) Jimmie Johnson (Chevrolet; Hendrick Motorsports) 830 (1 win) (3) (Wisconsin) Matt Kenseth (Ford; Roush Fenway Racing) 798

==== Basketball ====
- FIBA Africa Championship in Antananarivo, Madagascar:
  - Semifinals:
    - Ivory Coast 57–60 **Tunisia**
    - Nigeria 68–76 **Angola**
- FIBA Asia Championship for Women in Ōmura, Japan:
  - Semifinals:
    - **China** 76–62 Japan
    - **South Korea** 72–66 Chinese Taipei

==== Cricket ====
- (England) Friends Life t20 Final in Birmingham: Leicestershire Foxes 145/6 (20 overs); Somerset 127/9 (20 overs). **Leicestershire win by 18 runs**.

==== Cycling ====
- Grand Tours:
  - Vuelta a España, Stage 8: (gold) Joaquim Rodríguez (ESP) (Team Katusha) 4h 49' 01" (silver) Michele Scarponi (ITA) (Lampre–ISD) + 9" (bronze) Bauke Mollema (NED) (Rabobank) + 9"
    - General classification (after stage 8): (1) Rodríguez 32h 18' 16" (2) Daniel Moreno (ESP) (Team Katusha) + 32" (3) Jakob Fuglsang (DEN) (Leopard Trek) + 34"
- UCI Women's Road World Cup:
  - GP de Plouay in Plouay, France: (gold) Annemiek van Vleuten (NED) (Nederland bloeit) 3h 12' 28" (silver) Evelyn Stevens (USA) (HTC–Highroad Women) + 3" (bronze) Marianne Vos (NED) (Nederland bloeit) + 46"
    - Final standings: (1) van Vleuten 362 points (2) Vos 315 (3) Emma Johansson (SWE) (Hitec Products–UCK) 223

==== Field hockey ====
- Women's EuroHockey Nations Championship in Mönchengladbach, Germany:
  - Bronze medal match: (bronze) **England** 2–1 Spain
  - Final: (gold) **Netherlands** 3–0 (silver) Germany
    - The Netherlands win the title for the eighth time.

==== Football (soccer) ====
- 2012 CAF Women's Pre-Olympic Tournament final round first leg:
  - South Africa 3–0 Ethiopia
  - Nigeria 2–1 Cameroon
- CAF Champions League Group stage Matchday 4:
  - Group B: Espérance ST (Tunisia) 0–0 (Morocco) Wydad Casablanca
    - Standings: Espérance ST, Wydad Casablanca 6 points (4 matches), (Egypt) Al-Ahly 4 (3), (Algeria) MC Alger 1 (3).
- CAF Confederation Cup Group stage Matchday 4:
  - Group B:
    - Motema Pembe (Democratic Republic of the Congo) 2–0 (Algeria) JS Kabylie
    - Sunshine Stars (Nigeria) 1–1 (Morocco) Maghreb de Fès
      - Standings (after 4 matches): Maghreb de Fès 8 points, Motema Pembe, Sunshine Stars 7, JS Kabylie 0.
- (United States) Women's Professional Soccer Playoffs:
  - WPS Championship in Rochester, New York: **Western New York Flash** 1–1 (5–4 pen.) Philadelphia Independence

==== Golf ====
- PGA Tour:
  - FedEx Cup Playoffs: The Barclays in Edison, New Jersey:
    - Winner: Dustin Johnson (USA) 194 (−19)
      - Johnson wins his fifth PGA Tour title.
      - FedEx Cup points (all USA): (1) Johnson 3691 points (2) Matt Kuchar 2907 (3) Nick Watney 2256

==== Judo ====
- World Championships in Paris, France:
  - Men's 100 kg: (gold) Tagir Khaybulaev (RUS) (silver) Maxim Rakov (KAZ) (bronze) Lukas Krpalek (CZE) & Irakli Tsirekidze (GEO)
  - Men's +100 kg: (gold) Teddy Riner (FRA) (silver) Andreas Tölzer (GER) (bronze) Kim Sung-min (KOR) & Aleksandr Mikhailine (RUS)
    - Riner wins his fifth world championship title.
  - Women's +78 kg: (gold) Tong Wen (CHN) (silver) Qin Qian (CHN) (bronze) Elena Ivashchenko (RUS) & Mika Sugimoto (JPN)
    - Tong wins her fifth world championship title.

==== Mixed martial arts ====
- UFC 134 in Rio de Janeiro, Brazil:
  - Middleweight Championship: **Anderson Silva** (BRA) (c) def. Yushin Okami (JPN) via TKO (punches)
  - Light Heavyweight bout: **Maurício Rua** (BRA) def. Forrest Griffin (USA) via KO (punches)
  - Heavyweight bout: **Antônio Rodrigo Nogueira** (BRA) def. Brendan Schaub (USA) via KO (punches)
  - Lightweight bout: **Edson Barboza** (BRA) def. Ross Pearson (ENG) via split decision (29–28, 28–29, 29–28)
  - Light Heavyweight bout: **Stanislav Nedkov** (BUL) def. Luiz Cane (BRA) via TKO (punches)

==== Rugby league ====
- Challenge Cup Final in London: Leeds Rhinos 18–28 **Wigan Warriors**
  - Wigan win the Cup for the first time since 2002, and 18th time overall.

==== Rugby union ====
- Tri Nations Series:
  - Match 6: Australia 25–20 New Zealand
    - Final standings: Australia 13 points, New Zealand 10, South Africa 5.
      - Australia win the Tri Nations for the first time since 2001, and third time overall.
- Mid-year Tests, Week 8: Ireland 9–20 England

==== Tennis ====
- ATP World Tour:
  - Winston-Salem Open in Winston-Salem, United States:
    - Final: **John Isner** (USA) def. Julien Benneteau (FRA) 4–6, 6–3, 6–4
      - Isner wins his second title of the year and third of his career.
- WTA Tour:
  - New Haven Open at Yale in New Haven, United States:
    - Final: **Caroline Wozniacki** (DEN) def. Petra Cetkovská (CZE) 6–4, 6–1
      - Wozniacki wins her sixth title of the year and 18th of her career, and her fourth consecutive win at the event, matching the feat Venus Williams had also done at New Haven.
  - Texas Tennis Open in Dallas, United States:
    - Final: **Sabine Lisicki** (GER) def. Aravane Rezaï (FRA) 6–2, 6–1
      - Lisicki wins her second title of the year and third of her career.

==== Volleyball ====
- FIVB World Grand Prix final round in Macau, China:
  - Semifinals:
    - **Brazil** 3–0 Russia
    - Serbia 0–3 **United States**

=== August 26, 2011 (Friday) ===
==== Auto racing ====
- Nationwide Series:
  - Food City 250 in Bristol, Tennessee: (1) (Nevada) Kyle Busch (Toyota; Joe Gibbs Racing) (2) (Connecticut) Joey Logano (Toyota; Joe Gibbs Racing) (3) (Kansas) Clint Bowyer (Chevrolet; Kevin Harvick Incorporated)
    - Busch wins his 50th race in the secondary class, surpassing Mark Martin's record of 49 victories.
    - Drivers' championship standings (after 25 of 34 races): (1) (Mississippi) Ricky Stenhouse Jr. (Ford; Roush Fenway Racing) 867 points (2) (Virginia) Elliott Sadler (Chevrolet; Kevin Harvick Incorporated) 862 (3) (Georgia (U.S. state)) Reed Sorenson (Chevrolet; Turner Motorsports) 857

==== Cycling ====
- Grand Tours:
  - Vuelta a España, Stage 7: (gold) Marcel Kittel (GER) (Skil–Shimano) 4h 47' 59" (silver) Peter Sagan (SVK) (Liquigas–Cannondale) s.t. (bronze) Óscar Freire (ESP) (Rabobank) s.t.
    - General classification (after stage 7): (1) Sylvain Chavanel (FRA) (Quick-Step) 27h 29' 12" (2) Daniel Moreno (ESP) (Team Katusha) + 15" (3) Vincenzo Nibali (ITA) (Liquigas–Cannondale) + 16"

==== Equestrianism ====
- 2011 CHIO Rotterdam in Rotterdam, Netherlands (CSIO 5*):
  - Show jumping – Nations Cup: (gold) Germany (Marco Kutscher, Thomas Voß, Carsten-Otto Nagel, Marcus Ehning) (silver) Great Britain (Michael Whitaker, Guy Williams, Ben Maher, John Whitaker) (bronze) France (Pénélope Leprevost, Kevin Staut, Olivier Guillon, Michel Robert)
    - FEI Nations Cup standings (final after 8 competitions): (1) Germany 50 point (2) Netherlands 48.5 (3) Great Britain 47, relegated: United States, Denmark

==== Field hockey ====
- Men's EuroHockey Nations Championship in Mönchengladbach, Germany:
  - Semifinals:
    - Belgium 2–4 **Netherlands**
    - **Germany** 3–0 England

==== Football (soccer) ====
- UEFA Super Cup in Monaco: **Barcelona** (Spain) 2–0 (Portugal) Porto
  - Barcelona win the title for the fourth time.
- CAF Champions League Group stage Matchday 4:
  - Group A: Raja Casablanca (Morocco) 0–0 (Nigeria) Enyimba
    - Standings: Enyimba 8 points (4 matches), (Sudan) Al-Hilal 7 (3), Raja Casablanca 2 (4), (Cameroon) Coton Sport 1 (3).

==== Judo ====
- World Championships in Paris, France (JPN unless stated):
  - Men's 90 kg: (gold) Ilias Iliadis (GRE) (silver) Daiki Nishiyama (bronze) Asley González (CUB) & Takashi Ono
    - Iliadis wins the title for the second successive time.
  - Women's 70 kg: (gold) Lucie Décosse (FRA) (silver) Edith Bosch (NED) (bronze) Yoriko Kunihara & Anett Mészáros (HUN)
    - Décosse wins the title for the second successive time and third time overall.
  - Women's 78 kg: (gold) Audrey Tcheuméo (FRA) (silver) Akari Ogata (bronze) Mayra Aguiar (BRA) & Kayla Harrison (USA)

==== Snooker ====
- Ronnie O'Sullivan compiles the 11th official maximum break of his career during his sixth round match at the Paul Hunter Classic.

==== Volleyball ====
- FIVB World Grand Prix final round in Macau, China (teams in **bold** advance to the semifinals):
  - Pool A:
    - **Serbia** 3–0 Thailand
    - China 0–3 **Russia**
      - Final standings: Serbia 8 points, Russia 6, Thailand 3, China 1.
  - Pool B:
    - Italy 0–3 Japan
    - **Brazil** 3–1 **United States**
      - Final standings: Brazil 9 points, United States 5, Japan 3, Italy 1.

=== August 25, 2011 (Thursday) ===
==== Basketball ====
- FIBA Africa Championship in Antananarivo, Madagascar:
  - Quarterfinals:
    - **Nigeria** 94–86 Central African Republic
    - Senegal 59–75 **Ivory Coast**
    - **Tunisia** 86–67 Morocco
    - Cameroon 83–84 (OT) **Angola**
- FIBA Asia Championship for Women Level I in Ōmura, Japan (teams in **bold** advance to semifinals):
  - India 52–71 Lebanon
  - **South Korea** 69–67 **Chinese Taipei**
  - **China** 76–53 **Japan**
    - Final standings: Korea 10 points, China 9, Japan 8, Chinese Taipei 7, Lebanon 6, India 5.

==== Cricket ====
- England in Ireland:
  - Only ODI in Dublin: England 201/8 (42/42 overs); Ireland 117/8 (23/23 overs). **England win by 11 runs (D/L).**

==== Cycling ====
- Grand Tours:
  - Vuelta a España, Stage 6: (gold) Peter Sagan (SVK) (Liquigas–Cannondale) 4h 38' 22" (silver) Pablo Lastras (ESP) (Movistar Team) s.t. (bronze) Valerio Agnoli (ITA) (Liquigas–Cannondale) s.t.
    - General classification (after stage 6): (1) Sylvain Chavanel (FRA) (Quick-Step) 22h 41' 13" (2) Daniel Moreno (ESP) (Team Katusha) + 15" (3) Vincenzo Nibali (ITA) (Liquigas–Cannondale) + 16"

==== Field hockey ====
- Women's EuroHockey Nations Championship in Mönchengladbach, Germany:
  - Semifinals: (winners qualify for 2012 Summer Olympics)
    - **Netherlands** 2–0 England
    - Spain 1–2 **Germany**

==== Football (soccer) ====
- UEFA Women's Euro 2013 qualifying Group 5: Belarus 2–1 Estonia
- UEFA Europa League Play-off round second leg (first leg scores in parentheses):
  - Dinamo București (Romania) 2–3 (1–2) (Ukraine) **Vorskla Poltava**. Vorskla Poltava win 5–3 on aggregate.
  - Spartak Moscow (Russia) 2–3 (2–2) (Poland) **Legia Warsaw**. Legia Warsaw win 5–4 on aggregate.
  - **Rennes** (France) 4–0 (2–1) (Serbia) Red Star Belgrade. Rennes win 6–1 on aggregate.
  - **PSV Eindhoven** (Netherlands) 5–0 (0–0) (Austria) Ried. PSV Eindhoven win 5–0 on aggregate.
  - **AEK Larnaca** (Cyprus) 2–1 (0–0) (Norway) Rosenborg. AEK Larnaca win 2–1 on aggregate.
  - Spartak Trnava (Slovakia) 1–1 (0–2) (Russia) **Lokomotiv Moscow**. Lokomotiv Moscow win 3–1 on aggregate.
  - **Dynamo Kyiv** (Ukraine) 1–0 (2–1) (Bulgaria) Litex Lovech. Dynamo Kyiv win 3–1 on aggregate.
  - Gaz Metan Mediaș (Romania) 1–0 (1–3) **Austria Wien**. Austria Wien win 3–2 on aggregate.
  - Dinamo Tbilisi (Georgia (country)) 1–1 (a.e.t.) (0–1) (Greece) **AEK Athens**. AEK Athens win 2–1 on aggregate.
  - **Hapoel Tel Aviv** (Israel) 4–0 (0–1) (Lithuania) Ekranas. Hapoel Tel Aviv win 4–1 on aggregate.
  - CSKA Sofia (Bulgaria) 1–1 (0–2) (Romania) **Steaua București**. Steaua București win 3–1 on aggregate.
  - Young Boys (Switzerland) 2–2 (0–0) (Portugal) **Braga**. 2–2 on aggregate; Braga win on away goals.
  - **Rapid București** (Romania) 1–1 (3–1) (Poland) Śląsk Wrocław. Rapid București win 4–2 on aggregate.
  - Sparta Prague (Czech Republic) 1–0 (0–2) (Romania) **Vaslui**. Vaslui win 2–1 on aggregate.
  - Panathinaikos (Greece) 2–1 (0–3) (Israel) **Maccabi Tel Aviv**. Maccabi Tel Aviv win 4–2 on aggregate.
  - Helsingborg (Sweden) 1–3 (0–1) (Belgium) **Standard Liège**. Standard Liège win 4–1 on aggregate.
  - **Schalke 04** (Germany) 6–1 (0–2) (Finland) HJK Helsinki. Schalke 04 win 6–3 on aggregate.
  - Alania Vladikavkaz (Russia) 2–0 (0–3) (Turkey) **Beşiktaş**. Beşiktaş win 3–2 on aggregate.
  - Vitória Guimarães (Portugal) 0–4 (0–2) (Spain) **Atlético Madrid**. Atlético Madrid win 6–0 on aggregate.
  - Partizan (Serbia) 1–2 (a.e.t.) (1–1) (Republic of Ireland) **Shamrock Rovers**. Shamrock Rovers win 3–2 on aggregate.
  - **Anderlecht** (Belgium) 2–2 (2–1) (Turkey) Bursaspor. Anderlecht win 4–3 on aggregate.
  - Trabzonspor (Turkey) walkover (0–0) (Spain) **Athletic Bilbao**. Athletic Bilbao qualify for the group stage after Trabzonspor replace Fenerbahçe in the Champions League.
  - Rangers (Scotland) 1–1 (1–2) (Slovenia) **Maribor**. Maribor win 3–2 on aggregate.
  - Dnipro Dnipropetrovsk (Ukraine) 1–0 (0–3) (England) **Fulham**. Fulham win 3–1 on aggregate.
  - **Sion** (Switzerland) 3–1 (0–0) (Scotland) Celtic. Sion win 3–1 on aggregate.
  - **Club Brugge** (Belgium) 2–0 (3–3) (Georgia (country)) Zestafoni. Club Brugge win 5–3 on aggregate.
  - Sochaux (France) 0–4 (0–0) (Ukraine) **Metalist Kharkiv**. Metalist Kharkiv win 4–0 on aggregate.
  - Roma (Italy) 1–1 (0–1) (Slovakia) **Slovan Bratislava**. Slovan Bratislava win 2–1 on aggregate.
  - Rabotnički (North Macedonia) 1–3 (0–6) (Italy) **Lazio**. Lazio win 9–1 on aggregate.
  - **Birmingham City** (England) 3–0 (0–0) (Portugal) Nacional. Birmingham City win 3–0 on aggregate.
  - **Stoke City** (England) 4–1 (1–0) (Switzerland) Thun. Stoke City win 5–1 on aggregate.
  - **AZ** (Netherlands) 6–0 (1–2) (Norway) Aalesund. AZ win 7–2 on aggregate.
  - **Paris Saint-Germain** (France) 2–0 (4–0) (Luxembourg) Differdange 03. Paris Saint-Germain win 6–0 on aggregate.
  - Karpaty Lviv (Ukraine) 1–1 (0–2) (Greece) **PAOK**. PAOK win 3–1 on aggregate.
  - **Tottenham Hotspur** (England) 0–0 (5–0) (Scotland) Heart of Midlothian. Tottenham Hotspur win 5–0 on aggregate.
  - **Red Bull Salzburg** (Austria) 1–0 (1–2) (Cyprus) Omonia. 2–2 on aggregate; Red Bull Salzburg win on away goals.
  - Sevilla (Spain) 1–1 (1–2) (Germany) **Hannover 96**. Hannover 96 win 3–2 on aggregate.
  - **Sporting CP** (Portugal) 2–1 (0–0) (Denmark) Nordsjælland. Sporting CP win 2–1 on aggregate.
- Copa Sudamericana:
  - First stage, second leg (first leg score in parentheses): Juan Aurich (Peru) 1–2 (0–2) (Colombia) **La Equidad**. La Equidad win 6–0 on points.
  - Second stage, second leg (first leg score in parentheses): Palmeiras (Brazil) 3–1 (0–2) (Brazil) **Vasco da Gama**. 3–3 on points, 3–3 on aggregate; Vasco da Gama win on away goals.
- CONCACAF Champions League group stage Matchday 2:
  - Group A:
    - Los Angeles Galaxy (United States) 2–0 (Costa Rica) Alajuelense
    - Morelia (Mexico) 4–0 (Honduras) Motagua
      - Standings (after 2 matches): Los Angeles Galaxy 6 points, Morelia, Alajuelense 3, Motagua 0.
  - Group C:
    - Toronto FC (Canada) 0–1 (United States) FC Dallas
    - Tauro (Panama) 0–0 (Mexico) UNAM
      - Standings (after 2 matches): FC Dallas 6 points, Toronto FC 3, Tauro, UNAM 1.

==== Judo ====
- World Championships in Paris, France:
  - Men's 81 kg: (gold) Kim Jae-bum (KOR) (silver) Srđan Mrvaljević (MNE) (bronze) Leandro Guilheiro (BRA) & Sergiu Toma (MDA)
    - Kim wins the title for the second successive time.
  - Women's 63 kg: (gold) Gévrise Émane (FRA) (silver) Yoshie Ueno (JPN) (bronze) Anicka van Emden (NED) & Urška Žolnir (SLO)

==== Volleyball ====
- FIVB World Grand Prix final round in Macau, China (teams in **bold** advance to the semifinals):
  - Pool A:
    - Russia 1–3 Serbia
    - China 1–3 Thailand
      - Standings (after 2 matches): Serbia 5 points, Russia, Thailand 3, China 1.
  - Pool B:
    - **United States** 3–2 Italy
    - **Brazil** 3–0 Japan
      - Standings (after 2 matches): Brazil 6 points, United States 5, Italy 1, Japan 0.

=== August 24, 2011 (Wednesday) ===
==== Basketball ====
- FIBA Africa Championship in Antananarivo, Madagascar:
  - Round of 16:
    - **Ivory Coast** 80–72 Rwanda
    - **Tunisia** 94–50 South Africa
    - **Senegal** 92–75 Madagascar
    - **Morocco** 80–59 Mali
- FIBA Asia Championship for Women Level I in Ōmura, Japan (teams in **bold** advance to semifinals):
  - Lebanon 75–104 **South Korea**
  - **Chinese Taipei** 63–72 **China**
  - **Japan** 79–51 India
    - Standings (after 4 games): Korea 8 points, Japan, China 7, Chinese Taipei 6, Lebanon, India 4.

==== Cycling ====
- Grand Tours:
  - Vuelta a España, Stage 5: (gold) Joaquim Rodríguez (ESP) (Team Katusha) 4h 42' 54" (silver) Wout Poels (NED) (Vacansoleil–DCM) + 4" (bronze) Daniel Moreno (ESP) (Team Katusha) + 5"
    - General classification (after stage 5): (1) Sylvain Chavanel (FRA) (Quick-Step) 18h 02' 34" (2) Moreno + 9" (3) Rodríguez + 23"

==== Field hockey ====
- Men's EuroHockey Nations Championship in Mönchengladbach, Germany (teams in **bold** advance to semifinals; teams in italics qualify for 2012 Summer Olympics):
  - Pool A:
    - **Germany** 7–0 Russia
    - **Belgium** 3–2 Spain
      - Final standings: Germany 9 points, Belgium 6, Spain 3, Russia 0.
  - Pool B:
    - France 1–8 **England**
    - **Netherlands** 7–4 Ireland
      - Final standings: Netherlands 9 points, England 6, Ireland 3, France 0.

==== Football (soccer) ====
- UEFA Champions League Play-off round second leg (first leg scores in parentheses):
  - Rubin Kazan (Russia) 1–1 (1–3) (France) **Lyon**. Lyon win 4–2 on aggregate.
  - **Viktoria Plzeň** (Czech Republic) 2–1 (3–1) (Denmark) Copenhagen. Viktoria Plzeň win 5–2 on aggregate.
  - Sturm Graz (Austria) 0–2 (1–1) (Belarus) **BATE Borisov**. BATE Borisov win 3–1 on aggregate.
  - **Benfica** (Portugal) 3–1 (2–2) (Netherlands) Twente. Benfica win 5–3 on aggregate.
  - Udinese (Italy) 1–2 (0–1) (England) **Arsenal**. Arsenal win 3–1 on aggregate.
- Other UEFA Champions League news:
  - On the eve of the group stage draw, (Turkey) Fenerbahçe are removed from the Champions League amid allegations that they fixed matches to win last season's Turkish title. Their place in the group stage will be taken up by second-placed (Turkey) Trabzonspor, who had previously been eliminated from the competition by (Portugal) Benfica. Trabzonspor's opponent in the Europa League play-off round, (Spain) Athletic Bilbao, will receive a direct entry into the group stage of that competition.
- Recopa Sudamericana second leg (first leg score in parentheses): **Internacional** (Brazil) 3–1 (1–2) (Argentina) Independiente. 3–3 on points; Internacional win 4–3 on aggregate.
  - Internacional win the Recopa for the second time.
- Copa Sudamericana Second stage second leg (first leg scores in parentheses):
  - **São Paulo** (Brazil) 3–0 (1–2) (Brazil) Ceará. 3–3 on points; São Paulo win 4–2 on aggregate.
  - Atlético Paranaense (Brazil) 0–1 (0–1) (Brazil) **Flamengo**. Flamengo win 6–0 on points.
- CONCACAF Champions League group stage Matchday 2:
  - Group B: Isidro Metapán (El Salvador) 2–0 (Mexico) Santos Laguna
    - Standings (after 2 matches): (United States) Colorado Rapids 4 points, Isidro Metapán, Santos Laguna 3, (Honduras) Real España 1.
  - Group C: Toronto FC (Canada) – (United States) FC Dallas – abandoned at halftime due to lightning and heavy rain, to be replayed on August 25.
  - Group D: Comunicaciones (Guatemala) 2–0 (Costa Rica) Herediano
    - Standings (after 2 matches): (United States) Seattle Sounders FC 6 points, (Mexico) Monterrey, Comunicaciones 3, Herediano 0.

==== Judo ====
- World Championships in Paris, France (JPN unless stated):
  - Men's 73 kg: (gold) Riki Nakaya (silver) Dex Elmont (NED) (bronze) Navruz Jurakobilov (UZB) & Ugo Legrand (FRA)
  - Women's 52 kg: (gold) Misato Nakamura (silver) Yuka Nishida (bronze) Ana Carrascosa (ESP) & Andreea Chitu (ROU)
    - Nakamura wins her second world title.
  - Women's 57 kg: (gold) Aiko Sato (silver) Rafaela Silva (BRA) (bronze) Corina Caprioriu (ROU) & Kaori Matsumoto

==== Volleyball ====
- FIVB World Grand Prix final round in Macau, China:
  - Pool A:
    - Thailand 1–3 Russia
    - China 2–3 Serbia
  - Pool B:
    - Japan 0–3 United States
    - Brazil 3–0 Italy
- Women's African Championship in Nairobi, Kenya:
  - Bronze medal match: Senegal 2–3 (bronze) **Egypt**
  - Final: (gold) **Kenya** 3–1 (silver) Algeria
    - Kenya win the title for the seventh time, and qualify for the FIVB World Cup.

=== August 23, 2011 (Tuesday) ===
==== Basketball ====
- FIBA Africa Championship in Antananarivo, Madagascar:
  - Round of 16:
    - **Nigeria** 84–46 Chad
    - **Cameroon** 85–52 Togo
    - **Central African Republic** 71–66 Egypt
    - **Angola** 82–71 Mozambique
- FIBA Asia Championship for Women Level I in Ōmura, Japan (team in **bold** advances to semifinals):
  - China 87–38 India
  - Chinese Taipei 83–55 Lebanon
  - **South Korea** 66–59 Japan
    - Standings (after 3 games): Korea 6 points, China, Japan, Chinese Taipei 5, Lebanon, India 3.

==== Cycling ====
- Grand Tours:
  - Vuelta a España, Stage 4: (gold) Daniel Moreno (ESP) (Team Katusha) 4h 51' 53" (silver) Chris Anker Sørensen (DEN) (Saxo Bank–SunGard) + 3" (bronze) Dan Martin (IRL) (Garmin–Cervélo) + 11"
    - General classification (after stage 4): (1) Sylvain Chavanel (FRA) (Quick-Step) 13h 19' 09" (2) Moreno + 43" (3) Jakob Fuglsang (DEN) (Leopard Trek) + 49"

==== Field hockey ====
- Women's EuroHockey Nations Championship in Mönchengladbach, Germany (teams in **bold** advance to semifinals):
  - Pool A:
    - Azerbaijan 1–2 **Spain**
    - **Netherlands** 5–1 Italy
      - Final standings: Spain 9 points, Netherlands 6, Azerbaijan 3, Italy 0.
  - Pool B:
    - Ireland 1–3 **England**
    - **Germany** 4–0 Belgium
      - Final standings: England 9 points, Germany 6, Belgium 3, Ireland 0.

==== Football (soccer) ====
- UEFA Champions League Play-off round second leg (first leg scores in parentheses):
  - **APOEL** (Cyprus) 3–1 (0–1) (Poland) Wisła Kraków. APOEL win 3–2 on aggregate.
  - **Genk** (Belgium) 2–1 (1–2) (a.e.t.) (Israel) Maccabi Haifa. 3–3 on aggregate, Genk win 4–1 on penalties.
  - Malmö FF (Sweden) 2–0 (1–4) (Croatia) **Dinamo Zagreb**. Dinamo Zagreb win 4–3 on aggregate.
  - **Villarreal** (Spain) 3–0 (0–1) (Denmark) Odense. Villarreal win 3–1 on aggregate.
  - Zürich (Switzerland) 0–1 (0–2) (Germany) **Bayern Munich**. Bayern Munich win 3–0 on aggregate.
- Copa Sudamericana:
  - First stage, second leg (first leg score in parentheses): **Santa Fe** (Colombia) 2–0 (1–1) (Peru) Universidad César Vallejo. Santa Fe win 4–1 on points.
  - Second stage, second leg (first leg score in parentheses): **Botafogo** (Brazil) 1–0 (2–1) (Brazil) Atlético Mineiro. Botafogo win 6–0 on points.
- CONCACAF Champions League group stage Matchday 2:
  - Group B: Real España (Honduras) 1–1 (United States) Colorado Rapids
    - Standings: Colorado Rapids 4 points (2 matches), (Mexico) Santos Laguna 3 (1), Real España 1 (2), (El Salvador) Isidro Metapán 0 (1).
  - Group D:
    - Monterrey (Mexico) 0–1 (United States) Seattle Sounders FC
    - Comunicaciones (Guatemala) – (Costa Rica) Herediano — postponed due to heavy rain
      - Standings: Seattle Sounders 6 points (2 matches), Monterrey 3 (2), Comunicaciones, Herediano 0 (1).

==== Judo ====
- World Championships in Paris, France:
  - Men's 60 kg: (gold) Rishod Sobirov (UZB) (silver) Hiroaki Hiraoka (JPN) (bronze) Ilgar Mushkiyev (AZE) & Georgii Zantaraia (UKR)
    - Sobirov wins the title for the second successive time.
  - Men's 66 kg: (gold) Masashi Ebinuma (JPN) (silver) Leandro Cunha (BRA) (bronze) Musa Mogushkov (RUS) & Cho Jun-ho (KOR)
  - Women's 48 kg: (gold) Haruna Asami (JPN) (silver) Tomoko Fukumi (JPN) (bronze) Sarah Menezes (BRA) & Éva Csernoviczki (HUN)
    - Asami wins the title for the second successive time.

==== Multi-sport events ====
- Summer Universiade in Shenzhen, China:
  - Taekwondo:
    - Men's −63 kg: (gold) Umut Bildik (TUR) (silver) Steven Barclais (FRA) (bronze) Chu Yuan-chih (TPE) & Alfonso Victoria (MEX)
    - Men's −87 kg: (gold) Park Yong-hyun (KOR) (silver) Guilherme Felix (BRA) (bronze) Bruak Eski (TUR) & Rouhollah Talebi (IRI)
    - Women's −53 kg: (gold) Hatice Kübra Yangın (TUR) (silver) Laura Urriola (ESP) (bronze) Aziza Chambers (USA) & Ivett Gonda (CAN)
    - Women's −73 kg: (gold) Chuang Chia-chia (TPE) (silver) Park Mi-yeon (KOR) (bronze) Elena Gómez (ESP) & Anne-Caroline Graffe (FRA)
  - Water polo:
    - Men's tournament: (gold) Serbia (silver) Russia (bronze) Macedonia

=== August 22, 2011 (Monday) ===
==== Basketball ====
- FIBA Africa Championship in Antananarivo, Madagascar:
  - Group B:
    - Senegal 92–54 Chad
    - Morocco 61–75 Angola
      - Final standings: Senegal 6 points, Angola 5, Morocco 4, Chad 3.
  - Group D:
    - Rwanda 87–67 Togo
    - Central African Republic 52–65 Tunisia
      - Final standings: Tunisia 6 points, Central African Republic 5, Rwanda 4, Togo 3.
- FIBA Asia Championship for Women Level I in Ōmura, Japan:
  - India 47–83 South Korea
  - Lebanon 58–79 China
  - Japan 81–54 Chinese Taipei
    - Standings (after 2 games): Japan, Korea 4 points, China, Chinese Taipei 3, Lebanon, India 2.

==== Cricket ====
- India in England:
  - 4th Test in London, day 5: England 591/6d; India 300 & 283 (f/o, 91 overs; Graeme Swann 6/106). **England win by an innings & 8 runs; win 4-match series 4–0.**
- Australia in Sri Lanka:
  - 5th ODI in Hambantota: Australia 211 (46.1 overs); Sri Lanka 213/6 (47 overs). **Sri Lanka win by 4 wickets; Australia win 5-match series 3–2.**

==== Cycling ====
- Grand Tours:
  - Vuelta a España, Stage 3: (gold) Pablo Lastras (ESP) (Movistar Team) 3h 58' 00" (silver) Sylvain Chavanel (FRA) (Quick-Step) + 15" (bronze) Markel Irizar (ESP) (Team RadioShack) + 15"
    - General classification (after stage 3): (1) Lastras 8h 25' 59" (2) Chavanel + 20" (3) Irizar + 1' 08"

==== Field hockey ====
- Men's EuroHockey Nations Championship in Mönchengladbach, Germany (team in **bold** advances to semifinals):
  - Pool A:
    - Belgium 7–1 Russia
    - Spain 1–3 **Germany**
      - Standings (after 2 matches): Germany 6 points, Belgium, Spain 3, Russia 0.
  - Pool B:
    - France 0–2 Ireland
    - England 3–4 Netherlands
      - Standings (after 2 matches): Netherlands 6 points, England, Ireland 3, France 0.

==== Multi-sport events ====
- Summer Universiade in Shenzhen, China:
  - Badminton (TPE unless stated):
    - Men's singles: (gold) Suppanyu Avihingsanon (THA) (silver) Wen Kai (CHN) (bronze) Takuma Ueda (JPN) & Hsueh Hsuanyi
    - Men's doubles: (gold) Maneepong Jongjit/Bodin Isara (THA) (silver) Lee Sheng-mu/Fang Chieh-min (bronze) Afiat Yuris Wirawan/Rendy Sugiarto (INA) & Wu Chunwei/Liao Menchun
    - Women's singles: (gold) Cheng Shao-chieh (silver) Pai Hsiao-ma (bronze) Liu Fang Hua (CHN) & Shi Xiao Qian (CHN)
    - Women's doubles: (gold) Jang Ye-na/Eom Hye-won (KOR) (silver) Cheng/Pai (bronze) Wang Peirong/Hsieh Peichen & Savitree Amitrapai/Nessara Somsri (THA)
    - Mixed doubles: (gold) Eom Hye-won/Shin Baek-cheol (KOR) (silver) Lee/Hsieh (bronze) Ricky Widianto/Shendy Puspa Irawati (INA) & Jongjit/Amitrapai
  - Basketball:
    - Men's tournament: (gold) Serbia (silver) Canada (bronze) Lithuania
  - Diving:
    - Men's synchro 10m platform: (gold) Huo Liang/Lin Yue (CHN) 474.69 points (silver) Victor Minibaev/Ilya Zakharov (RUS) 453.42 (bronze) Rommel Pacheco/Jonathan Ruvalcaba (MEX) 421.50
    - Men's team: (gold) China 3718.46 points (silver) Ukraine 3239.83 (bronze) Russia 3239.69
    - Women's synchro 3m springboard: (gold) He Zi/Wang Han (CHN) 334.20 points (silver) Olena Fedorova/Hanna Pysmenska (UKR) 301.50 (bronze) Bianca Alvarez/Carrie Dragland (USA) 292.50
    - Women's team: (gold) China 2674.18 points (silver) United States 2373.03 (bronze) Malaysia 2336.23
  - Football:
    - Men's tournament: (gold) Japan (silver) Great Britain (bronze) Brazil
  - Gymnastics:
    - Group aerobics: (gold) China (Che Lei, Li Liangfa, Liu Chao, Liu Tianbo, Tao Le, Wang Zizhuo) 21.750 (silver) Russia (Danil Chayun, Garsevan Dzhanazyan, Valerii Gusev, Alexander Kondratichev, Kirill Lobaznyuk, Igor Trushkov) 21.650 (bronze) Romania (Andreea Bogati, Laura Andreea Cristache, Petru Porime Tolan, Anca Claudia Surdu, Mircea Zamfir) 21.265
    - Aerobic teams: (gold) China & Romania (bronze) Russia
    - Hoop: (gold) Yevgeniya Kanayeva (RUS) 29.150 (silver) Alina Maksimenko (UKR) 28.100 (bronze) Deng Senyue (CHN) 27.050
    - Ball: (gold) Kanayeva 29.200 (silver) Daria Dmitrieva (RUS) 28.400 (bronze) Liubov Charkashyna (BLR) 28.200
    - Clubs: (gold) Kanayeva 29.200 (silver) Aliya Garayeva (AZE) 27.725 (bronze) Maksimenko 27.375
    - Ribbon: (gold) Dmitrieva 28.600 (silver) Kanayeva 28.575 (bronze) Charkashyna 28.200
    - 3 ribbons + 2 hoops: (gold) China (Liu Shu, Ma Qianhui, Wang Xue, Wang Yuting, Wu Mengran, Zou Lie) 27.100 (silver) Russia (Alexandra Elyutina, Margarita Goncharova, Yulia Guryanova, Daria Kuvshinova, Anna Loman, Alexandra Makarova) 26.900 (bronze) Japan (Yurie Akashi, Saori Inagaki, Motoi Kasahara, Yurika Kurimoto, Kaho Okamoto, Kasumi Sakihama) 24.600
    - 5 balls: (gold) China (Liu Shu, Ma, Wang Xue, Wang Yuting, Wu, Zou) 26.950 (silver) Russia (Elyutina, Goncharova, Guryanova, Kuvshinova, Loman, Makarova) 26.925 (bronze) Japan (Akashi, Inagaki, Kasahara, Kurimoto, Okamoto, Sakihama) 25.875
  - Shooting:
    - Men's 50m rifle 3 positions: (gold) Niccolò Campriani (ITA) (silver) Kang Hongwei (CHN) (bronze) Sergey Kamenskiy (RUS)
    - Men's 25m standard pistol: (gold) Ding Feng (CHN) (silver) Zhou Zhiguo (CHN) (bronze) Dmitry Brayko (RUS)
    - Men's team 25m standard pistol: (gold) China (Ding, Li Yuehong, Zhou) (silver) Russia (Brayko, Sergei Cherviakovski, Ivan Stukachev) (bronze) Thailand (Pongpol Kulchairattana, Pruet Sriyaphan, Bhawin Tantinvachai)
    - Men's double trap: (gold) Alexander Furasyev (RUS) 193 (silver) Pan Qiang (CHN) 192 (bronze) Hwang Sun-jin (KOR) 191
    - Men's team double trap: (gold) China (Pan, Yang Yiyang, Li Jun) 427 (silver) Russia (Furasyev, Artur Mingazov, Roman Zagumennov) 423 (bronze) Italy Antonino Barillà, Alessandro Chianese, Ferdinando Rossi) 420
    - Women's 50m rifle 3 positions: (gold) Adéla Sýkorová (CZE) (silver) Narantuya Chuluunbadrakh (MGL) (bronze) Kata Veres (HUN)
    - Women's double trap: (gold) Yang Xiaohui (CHN) 101 (silver) Mariya Dmitriyenko (UKR) 98+3 (bronze) Hsu Jie-yu (TPE) 98+2
  - Taekwondo:
    - Men's −74 kg: (gold) Kim Seon-uk (KOR) (silver) Farzad Zolghadri (IRI) (bronze) Christos Pilavakis (CYP) & Fernando Ortega (MEX)
    - Men's +87 kg: (gold) Arsen Tcinaridze (RUS) (silver) Ali Sari (TUR) (bronze) Balázs Tóth (HUN) & Rosbelis Despaigne (CUB)
    - Women's −62 kg: (gold) Noh Eun-sil (KOR) (silver) Eva Calvo Gómez (ESP) (bronze) Carmen Marton (AUS) & Edina Kotsis (HUN)
    - Women's +73 kg: (gold) Zhang Yongtong (CHN) (silver) Wiam Dislam (MAR) (bronze) Olga Ivanova (RUS) & Tuba Abus (TUR)
  - Volleyball:
    - Men's tournament: (gold) Russia (silver) Ukraine (bronze) Brazil
  - Water polo:
    - Women's tournament: (gold) China (silver) United States (bronze) Russia

==== Volleyball ====
- Women's African Championship in Nairobi, Kenya:
  - Semifinals:
    - **Kenya** 3–0 Senegal
    - **Algeria** 3–1 Egypt

=== August 21, 2011 (Sunday) ===
==== Auto racing ====
- Sprint Cup Series:
  - Pure Michigan 400 in Brooklyn, Michigan: (1) (Nevada) Kyle Busch (Toyota; Joe Gibbs Racing) (2) (California) Jimmie Johnson (Chevrolet; Hendrick Motorsports) (3) Brad Keselowski (Dodge; Penske Racing)
    - Busch becomes the first driver to clinch a spot in the Chase for the Sprint Cup.
    - Drivers' championship standings (after 23 of 36 races): (1) Busch 799 points (2) Johnson 789 (3) (California) Kevin Harvick (Chevrolet; Richard Childress Racing) 760 (3 wins)
- V8 Supercars:
  - Ipswich 300 in Ipswich, Queensland:
    - Race 18: (1) Craig Lowndes (AUS) (Triple Eight Race Engineering; Holden VE Commodore) (2) Tim Slade (AUS) (James Rosenberg Racing; Ford FG Falcon) (3) Shane van Gisbergen (NZL) (Stone Brothers Racing; Ford FG Falcon)
      - Drivers' championship standings (after 18 of 28 races): (1) Jamie Whincup (AUS) (Triple Eight Race Engineering; Holden VE Commodore) 1895 points (2) Lowndes 1797 (3) Van Gisbergen 1502
- World Rally Championship:
  - Rallye Deutschland in Trier, Germany: (1) Sébastien Ogier (FRA)/Julien Ingrassia (FRA) (Citroën DS3 WRC) (2) Sébastien Loeb (FRA)/Daniel Elena (MON) (Citroën DS3 WRC) (3) Dani Sordo (ESP)/Carlos Del Barrio (ESP) (Mini John Cooper Works WRC)
    - Drivers' championship standings (after 9 of 13 rallies): (1) Loeb 192 points (2) Ogier 167 (3) Mikko Hirvonen (FIN) (Ford Fiesta RS WRC) 156

==== Basketball ====
- FIBA Africa Championship in Antananarivo, Madagascar:
  - Group A:
    - Mali 72–69 (OT) Mozambique
    - Nigeria 112–81 Madagascar
      - Final standings: Nigeria 6 points, Mali 5, Mozambique 4, Madagascar 3.
  - Group C:
    - Egypt 68–71 South Africa
    - Cameroon 76–70 Ivory Coast
      - Final standings: Cameroon 6 points, Côte d'Ivoire, Egypt, South Africa 4.
- FIBA Asia Championship for Women Level I in Ōmura, Japan:
  - Chinese Taipei 81–53 India
  - South Korea 99–93 (2OT) China
  - Lebanon 49–77 Japan
- FIBA Europe Under-16 Championship for Women in Cagliari, Italy:
  - Bronze medal game: (bronze) **Italy** 82–48 Turkey
  - Final: (silver) Belgium 43–67 (gold) **Spain**
    - Spain win the title for the seventh time.
- PBA Governors Cup Finals in Quezon City, Philippines:
  - Game 6: Petron Blaze Boosters 85, Talk 'N Text Tropang Texters 73. **Boosters win series 4–3.**
    - Petron win their 19th league title and prevent Talk 'N Text from winning the Grand Slam.

==== Canoeing ====
- Sprint World Championships in Szeged, Hungary:
  - Men's Canoe:
    - C–1 200 m: (gold) Valentin Demyanenko (AZE) 39.339 (silver) Ivan Shtyl (RUS) 39.573 (bronze) Alfonso Benavides (ESP) 39.687
      - Demyanenko wins the event for the third time.
    - C–1 5000 m: (gold) Mykhaylo Koshman (UKR) 23:23.823 (silver) Lukáš Koranda (CZE) 23:24.987 (bronze) José Luis Bouza (ESP) 23:55.173
    - C–2 200 m: (gold) Raimundas Labuckas/Tomas Gadeikis (LTU) 37.101 (silver) Viktor Melantyev/Nikolay Lipkin (RUS) 37.413 (bronze) Dzmitry Rabchanka/Aleksandr Vauchetskiy (BLR) 37.599
      - Labuckas and Gadeikis win the event for the third successive time.
    - C–1 4 × 200 m Relay: (gold) Russia (Shtyl, Evgeny Ignatov, Alexey Korovashkov, Melantiev) 2:46.955 (silver) Azerbaijan (Sergiy Bezugliy, Maksym Prokopenko, Demyanenko, Andriy Kraytor) 2:48.341 (bronze) Germany (Stefan Holtz, Björn Waeschke, Stefan Kiraj, Sebastian Brendel) 2:48.473
      - Shtyl and Ignatov both win the event for the third successive time and their sixth world title overall.
  - Men's Kayak:
    - K–1 200 m: (gold) Piotr Siemionowski (POL) 34.770 (silver) Ed McKeever (GBR) 34.986 (bronze) Ronald Rauhe (GER) 35.118
    - K–1 5000 m: (gold) Max Hoff (GER) 19:51.200 (silver) Aleh Yurenia (BLR) 20:07.952 (bronze) Maximilian Benassi (ITA) 20:11.936
      - Hoff wins his second title of the championships and fourth world title overall.
    - K–2 200 m: (gold) Arnaud Hybois/Sébastien Jouve (FRA) 31.940 (silver) Jon Schofield/Liam Heath (GBR) 32.156 (bronze) Raman Piatrushenka/Vadzim Makhneu (BLR) 32.390
      - Hybois and Jouve both win the event for the second time and their third world title overall.
    - K–1 4 × 200 m Relay: (gold) Spain (Saúl Craviotto Rivero, Ekaitz Saies Sistiaga, Carlos Pérez Rial, Pablo Andrés) 2:24.891 (silver) Russia (Viktor Zavolskiy, Alexander Dyachenko, Mikhail Tamonov, Yevgeny Salakhov) 2:25.701 (bronze) Denmark (Casper Nielsen, Jimmy Bøjesen, Kasper Bleibach, Lasse Nielsen) 2:25.821
      - Pérez wins the event for the third successive time and his fourth world title overall.
      - Andres wins the event for the second time.
  - Women's canoe:
    - C–1 200 m: (gold) Laurence Vincent-Lapointe (CAN) 39.339 (silver) Maria Kazakova (RUS) 39.339 (bronze) Staniliya Stamenova (BUL) 39.339
      - Vincent-Lapointe wins her second title of the championships, her second title in this event and third world title overall.
  - Women's Kayak:
    - K–1 200 m: (gold) Lisa Carrington (NZL) 39.998 (silver) Marta Walczykiewicz (POL) 40.472 (bronze) Inna Osypenko-Radomska (UKR) 40.670
    - K–1 5000 m: (gold) Tamara Csipes (HUN) 22:19.816 (silver) Lani Belcher (GBR) 22:26.572 (bronze) Maryna Paltaran (BLR) 22:37.294
      - Csipes wins her second title of the championships and fourth world title overall.
    - K–2 200 m: (gold) Katalin Kovács/Danuta Kozák (HUN) 37.667 (silver) Karolina Naja/Magdalena Krukowska (POL) 38.165 (bronze) Joanne Brigden-Jones/Hannah Davis (AUS) 38.369
      - Kovács wins her second title of the championships, her fifth title in this event and extends her record to 31 titles and 40 medals overall.
      - Kozák wins her second title of the championships and fifth world title overall.
    - K–1 4 × 200 m Relay: (gold) Germany (Nicole Reinhardt, Conny Waßmuth, Tina Dietze, Carolin Leonhardt) 2:49.541 (silver) Russia (Natalia Lobova, Anastasiya Sergeeva, Natalia Proskurina, Svetlana Kudinova) 2:50.207 (bronze) Poland (Walczykiewicz, Naja, Aneta Konieczna, Ewelina Wojnarowska) 2:50.951
      - Reinhardt wins her second title of the championships, her third title in this event and eighth world title overall.
      - Waßmuth wins her third title in this event and seventh world title overall.
      - Dietze wins her second title in this event and third world title overall.
      - Leonhardt wins her sixth world title.

==== Cricket ====
- India in England:
  - 4th Test in London, day 4: England 591/6d; India 300 (94 overs; Rahul Dravid 146*) & 129/3 (f/o, 35 overs). India trail by 162 runs with 7 wickets remaining.
- Bangladesh in Zimbabwe:
  - 5th ODI in Bulawayo: Bangladesh 253/6 (50 overs); Zimbabwe 160 (38.2 overs). **Bangladesh win by 93 runs; Zimbabwe win 5-match series 3–2.**

==== Cycling ====
- Grand Tours:
  - Vuelta a España, Stage 2: (gold) Christopher Sutton (AUS) (Team Sky) 4h 11' 41" (silver) Vicente Reynés (ESP) (Omega Pharma–Lotto) s.t. (bronze) Marcel Kittel (GER) (Skil–Shimano) s.t.
    - General classification (after stage 2): (1) Daniele Bennati (ITA) (Leopard Trek) 4h 28' 11" (2) Jakob Fuglsang (DEN) (Leopard Trek) + 0" (3) Maxime Monfort (BEL) (Leopard Trek) + 0"
- UCI World Tour:
  - Vattenfall Cyclassics: (gold) Edvald Boasson Hagen (NOR) (Team Sky) 4h 49' 40" (silver) Gerald Ciolek (GER) (Quick-Step) s.t. (bronze) Borut Božič (SLO) (Vacansoleil–DCM) s.t.
    - UCI World Tour standings (after 21 of 27 races): (1) Cadel Evans (AUS) (BMC Racing Team) 574 points (2) Philippe Gilbert (BEL) (Omega Pharma–Lotto) 568 (3) Alberto Contador (ESP) (Saxo Bank–SunGard) 471
- UCI Mountain Bike World Cup Final in Val di Sole, Italy:
  - Men's cross-country: (gold) Jaroslav Kulhavý (CZE) (silver) Nino Schurter (SUI) (bronze) Florian Vogel (SUI)
    - Final Standings: (1) Kulhavy (2) Schurter (3) Julien Absalon (FRA)
  - Women's cross-country: (gold) Catharine Pendrel (CAN) (silver) Maja Włoszczowska (POL) (bronze) Gunn-Rita Dahle Flesjå (NOR)
    - Final Standings: (1) Julie Bresset (FRA) (2) Pendrel (3) Irina Kalentieva (RUS)
  - Men's downhill: (gold) Aaron Gwin (USA) 3:10.356 (silver) Danny Hart (GBR) 3:11.588 (bronze) Gee Atherton (GBR) 3:14.470
    - Final standings: (1) Gwin 1558 points (2) Greg Minnaar (RSA) 1093 (3) Atherton 1009
  - Women's downhill: (gold) Myriam Nicole (FRA) 3:52.231 (silver) Floriane Pugin (FRA) 3:53.040 (bronze) Rachel Atherton (GBR) 3:54.405
    - Final standings: (1) Tracy Moseley (GBR) 1465 points (2) Pugin 1390 (3) Atherton 1115
  - Men's four-cross: (gold) Tomáš Slavík (CZE) (silver) Johannes Fischbach (GER) (bronze) Kamil Tatarkovič (SRB)
    - Final standings: (1) Jared Graves (AUS) 1620 points (2) Slavík 1174 (3) Michal Prokop (CZE) 1030
  - Women's four-cross: (gold) Anneke Beerten (NED) (silver) Lucia Oetjen (SUI) (bronze) Melissa Buhl (USA)
    - Final standings: (1) Beerten 1400 points (2) Oetjen 1010 (3) Fionn Griffiths (GBR) 780

==== Equestrianism ====
- European Dressage Championship in Rotterdam, Netherlands:
  - Grand Prix Freestyle: (gold) Adelinde Cornelissen (NED) on Parzival (silver) Carl Hester (GBR) on Uthopia (bronze) Patrik Kittel (SWE) on Scandic

==== Field hockey ====
- Men's EuroHockey Nations Championship in Mönchengladbach, Germany:
  - Pool B:
    - England 4–2 Ireland
    - Netherlands 8–1 France
- Women's EuroHockey Nations Championship in Mönchengladbach, Germany:
  - Pool A:
    - Azerbaijan 5–3 Italy
    - Spain 1–0 Netherlands
      - Standings (after 2 matches): Spain 6 points, Netherlands, Azerbaijan 3, Italy 0.
  - Pool B: (team in **bold** advances to the semifinals)
    - **England** 2–0 Germany
    - Ireland 0–3 Belgium
      - Standings (after 2 matches): England 6 points, Germany, Belgium 3, Ireland 0.

==== Golf ====
- Senior majors:
  - Constellation Energy Senior Players Championship in Harrison, New York:
    - Leaderboard after final round: (T1) Fred Couples (USA) & John Cook (USA) 273 (−11) (3) Peter Senior (AUS) 274 (−10)
      - Couples defeats Cook on the third playoff hole to win his first senior major and fifth career Champions Tour title.
- PGA Tour:
  - Wyndham Championship in Greensboro, North Carolina:
    - Winner: Webb Simpson (USA) 262 (−18)
      - Simpson wins his first PGA Tour title.
- European Tour:
  - Czech Open in Čeladná, Czech Republic:
    - Winner: Oliver Fisher (ENG) 275 (−13)
      - Fisher wins his first European Tour title.
- LPGA Tour:
  - Safeway Classic in North Plains, Oregon:
    - Winner: Suzann Pettersen (NOR) 207 (−6)^{PO}
      - Pettersen defeats Choi Na-yeon (KOR) on the first playoff hole to win her eighth LPGA Tour title.

==== Multi-sport events ====
- Summer Universiade in Shenzhen, China:
  - Athletics:
    - Men's 800m: (gold) Lachlan Renshaw (AUS) 1:46.36 (silver) Teng Haining (CHN) 1:46.62 (bronze) Fred Samoei (KEN) 1:46.72
    - Men's 5000m: (gold) Andy Vernon (GBR) 14:00.06 (silver) Evgeny Rybakov (RUS) 14:00.60 (bronze) Stefano La Rosa (ITA) 14:02.95
    - Men's 4 × 100 m relay: (gold) South Africa (Johannes Dreyer, Simon Magakwe, Rapula Sefanyetso, Thuso Mpuang) 39.25 (silver) China (Yang Yang, Huang Minhua, Chang Pengben, Zheng Dongsheng) 39.39 (bronze) Hong Kong (Yip Siukeung, Lai Chun Ho, Leung Kiho, Ho Manloklawrence) 39.44
    - Men's 4 × 400 m relay: (gold) Russia (Aleksandr Sigalovskiy, Dmitry Buryak, Artem Vazhov, Valentin Kruglyakov) 3:04.51 (silver) Japan (Hiroyuki Nakano, Shintaro Horie, Hideyuki Hirose, Takatoshi Abe) 3:05.16 (bronze) South Africa (Shane Victor, André Olivier, Pieter Beneke, Willem de Beer) 3:05.61
    - Men's long jump: (gold) Su Xiongfeng (CHN) 8.17m (silver) Marquise Goodwin (USA) 8.03m (bronze) Julian Reid (GBR) 7.96m
    - Men's discus throw: (gold) Märt Israel (EST) 64.07m (silver) Przemyslaw Czajkowski (POL) 63.62m (bronze) Ronald Julião (BRA) 63.30m
    - Men's half marathon: (gold) Ahmed Tamri (MAR) 1:06:20 (silver) Fatih Bilgic (TUR) 1:06:20 (bronze) Tsubasa Hayakawa (JPN) 1:06:25
    - Men's team half marathon: (gold) Japan (Hayakawa, Hiromitsu Kakuage, Takehiro Deki) 3:20:37 (silver) China (Bian Qi, Zheng Guojun, Yan Jun) 3:37:25
    - Women's 1500m: (gold) Aslı Çakır Alptekin (TUR) 4:05.56 (silver) Anna Mishchenko (UKR) 4:05.91 (bronze) Ekaterina Gorbunova (RUS) 4:06.16
    - Women's 4 × 100 m relay: (gold) Ukraine (Hanna Titimets, Nataliya Pohrebnyak, Khrystyna Stuy, Yelizaveta Bryzhina) 43.33 (silver) United States (Lakya Brookins, Shayla Mahan, Christina Manning, Tiffany Townsend) 43.48 (bronze) Jamaica (Shermaine Williams, Carrie Russell, Anneisha McLaughlin, Anastasia Le-Roy) 43.57
    - Women's 4 × 400 m relay: (gold) Russia (Marina Karnaushchenko, Yelena Migunova, Kseniya Ustalova, Olga Topilskaya) 3:27.16 (silver) (Nagihan Karadere, Merve Aydın, Meliz Redif, Pınar Saka) 3:30.14 (bronze) Great Britain (Kelly Massey, Charlotte Best, Meghan Beesley, Emily Diamond) 3:33.09
    - Women's high jump: (gold) Brigetta Barrett (USA) 1.96m (silver) Airinė Palšytė (LTU) 1.96m (bronze) Anna Iljuštšenko (EST) 1.94m
    - Women's half marathon: (gold) Ro Un-Ok (PRK) 1:16:38 (silver) Jin Lingling (CHN) 1:16:42 (bronze) Sayo Nomura (JPN) 1:16:48
    - Women's team half marathon: (gold) Japan (Nomura, Machiko Iwakawa, Aki Otagiri) 3:50:43 (silver) China (Jin, Jiang Xiaoli, Li Zhenzhu) 3:53:09
  - Basketball:
    - Women's tournament: (gold) United States (silver) Chinese Taipei (bronze) Australia
  - Chess (CHN unless stated):
    - Men's individual: (gold) Li Chao (silver) Wang Hao (bronze) Wang Yue
    - Women's individual: (gold) Tan Zhongyi (silver) Batkhuyagiin Möngöntuul (MGL) (bronze) Huang Qian
    - Mixed team: (gold) China (silver) Ukraine (bronze) Georgia
  - Diving:
    - Men's 10m platform: (gold) Wu Jun (CHN) 537.00 points (silver) Victor Minibaev (RUS) 528.75 (bronze) Rommel Pacheco (MEX) 492.05
  - Football:
    - Women's tournament: (gold) China (silver) Japan (bronze) Brazil
  - Gymnastics:
    - Aerobic step: (gold) China (Huang Jinxuan, Lin Junxian, Qiao Dayan, Shou Minchao, Wang Yang, Xu Fan, Zhao Sitong, Zheng Ziya, Zou Qin) 17.750 (silver) Russia (Polina Amosenok, Danil Chayun, Maxim Grinin, Olga Kislukhina, Veronika Korneva, Anzhella Korotkova, Evgeniya Kudymova, Kirill Lobaznyuk, Dmitrii Safonov, Denis Shurupov) 17.600 (bronze) South Korea (Choe Ha-neul, Jo Ye-ran, Kim Ji-un, Lee Sa-lang, Shim Mi-hyun, Shin Hyun-kyung) 17.520
    - Trios: (gold) South Korea (Kim Guon-taeck, Lee Kyung-ho, Ryu Ju-sun) 21.400 (silver) Russia (Alexander Kondratichev, Lobaznyuk, Igor Trushkov) 21.100 (bronze) Romania (Valentin Mavrodineanu, Tolan Petru Porime, Mircea Zamfir) 20.950
    - All-around individual: (gold) Yevgeniya Kanayeva (RUS) 115.350 (silver) Daria Dmitrieva (RUS) 111.875 (bronze) Liubov Charkashyna (BLR) 109.700
    - All-around team: (gold) China (Liu Shu, Ma Qianhui, Wang Xue, Wang Yuting, Wu Mengran, Zou Lie) 52.750 (silver) Russia (Alexandra Elyutina, Margarita Goncharova, Yulia Guryanova, Daria Kuvshinova, Anna Loman, Alexandra Makarova) 51.525 (bronze) Japan (Yurie Akashi, Saori Inagaki, Motoi Kasahara, Yurika Kurimoto, Kaho Okamoto, Kasumi Sakihama) 49.750
  - Sailing:
    - Men's laser standard: (gold) Daniel Mihelic (CRO) (silver) Malte Kamrath (GER) (bronze) Sergey Komissarov (RUS)
    - Men's RS:X: (gold) Fang Zhennan (CHN) (silver) Lukasz Grodzicki (POL) (bronze) Lee Tae-hoon (KOR)
    - 470 Open: (gold) Vladimir Chaus/Denis Gribanov (RUS) (silver) Fábio Silva/Gustavo Thiesen (BRA) (bronze) Erika Tokushige/Jumpei Hokazono (JPN)
    - Women's laser radial: (gold) Zhang Dongshuang (CHN) (silver) Victoria Jing Hua Chan (SIN) (bronze) Yevgeniya Kuznetsova (RUS)
    - Women's RS:X: (gold) Chen Peina (CHN) (silver) Megumi Komine (JPN) (bronze) Malgorzata Bialecka (POL)
    - Country classification: (gold) China (Chen Zhiwei, Fang, Xie Lidiao, Zhang) (silver) Russia (Chaus, Liudmila Dmitrieva, Gribanov, Alisa Kirilyuk, Kuznetsova) (bronze) Japan (Hokazono, Megumi Iseda, Megumi Komine, Jun Ogawa, Tokushige)
  - Shooting:
    - Men's skeet: (gold) Giancarlo Tazza (ITA) 147+2 (silver) Ralf Buchheim (GER) 147+1 (bronze) Gorden Gosch (GER) 143
    - Men's team skeet: (gold) Czech Republic (Daniel Herberger, Petr Málek, Jakub Novota) 353 (silver) Russia (Alexander Bondar, Nikolay Pilshchikov, Nikolay Teplyy) 350 (bronze) Cyprus (Anastasios Chapesiis, Andreas Chasikos, Dimitris Konstantinou) 344
    - Men's team 50m rifle 3 positions: (gold) China (Cao Yifei, Kang Hongwei, Gong Jiawei) 3503+166 (silver) France (Jeremy Monnier, Etienne Germond, Remi Moreno Flores) 3490+151 (bronze) Russia (Sergey Kamenskiy, Vladimir Tugushev, Nazar Luginets) 3481+155
    - Women's 25m pistol: (gold) Tanyaporn Prucksakorn (THA) (silver) Zorana Arunović (SRB) (bronze) Olena Kostevych (UKR)
    - Women's team 25m pistol: (gold) Ukraine (Kostevych, Inna Kryachko, Kateryna Domkina) 1728+47 (silver) South Korea (Lee Ho-lim, Jo Soo-young, Kim Ji-hye) 1721+44 (bronze) China (Lu Miaoyi, Zhang Shasha, Zhao Xu) 1717+48
  - Taekwondo:
    - Men's −58 kg: (gold) Safwan Khalil (AUS) (silver) Hadi Mostean (IRI) (bronze) Serkan Tok (TUR) & Andrei Rotaru (MDA)
    - Men's −80 kg: (gold) Mehran Askari (IRI) (silver) Yunus Sarı (TUR) (bronze) Avet Osmanov (RUS) & Issam Chernoubi (MAR)
    - Women's −49 kg: (gold) Alexandra Lychagina (RUS) (silver) Kim Jae-ah (KOR) (bronze) Hung Shih-han (TPE) & Maeva Coutant (FRA)
    - Women's −67 kg: (gold) Guo Yunfei (CHN) (silver) Furkan Asena Aydın (TUR) (bronze) Woo Seu-mi (KOR) Seham Sawalhy (EGY)
  - Tennis:
    - Men's singles: (gold) Lim Yong-kyu (KOR) (silver) Teymuraz Gabashvili (RUS) (bronze) Siarhei Betau (BLR) & Aliaksander Bury (BLR)
    - Men's team: (gold) South Korea (Lim, Oh Dae-soung, Seol Jae-min) (silver) Belarus (Betau, Bury) (bronze) Chinese Taipei (Hsieh Cheng-peng, Huang Liang-chi, Lee Hsin-han)
    - Women's singles: (gold) Nudnida Luangnam (THA) (silver) Nungnadda Wannasuk (THA) (bronze) Ksenia Lykina (RUS) & Yoo Mi (KOR)
    - Women's team: (gold) Thailand (Luangnam, Wannasuk, Varatchaya Wongteanchai) (silver) Japan (Shuko Aoyama, Sachie Ishizu, Hiroko Kuwata, Kotomi Takahata) (bronze) Russia (Lykina, Marta Sirotkina)
    - Mixed doubles: (gold) Chan Chin-wei/Lee (TPE) (silver) Bury/Sviatlana Pirazhenka (BLR) (bronze) Aoyama/Takuto Niki (JPN) & Weerapat Doakmaiklee/Wongteanchai (THA)
  - Volleyball:
    - Women's tournament: (gold) Brazil (silver) China (bronze) Russia

==== Rugby union ====
- Mid-year Tests, Week 7: Japan 20–14 United States

==== Snooker ====
- Players Tour Championship – Event 3 in Sheffield, England:
  - Final: **Ben Woollaston** (ENG) 4–2 Graeme Dott (SCO)
    - Woollaston wins his first professional title.
    - Order of Merit (after 3 of 12 events): (1) Ronnie O'Sullivan (ENG) 11,700 (2) Judd Trump 10,600 (3) Woollaston 10,200

==== Tennis ====
- ATP World Tour:
  - Western & Southern Open in Cincinnati, United States:
    - Final: **Andy Murray** (GBR) def. Novak Djokovic (SRB) 6–4, 3–0 retired
      - Murray wins his second title of the year, and his seventh Masters 1000 title and 18th title of his career.
      - Djokovic suffers only his second defeat of the year.
- WTA Tour:
  - Western & Southern Open in Cincinnati, United States:
    - Final: **Maria Sharapova** (RUS) def. Jelena Janković (SRB) 4–6, 7–6(3), 6–3
      - Sharapova wins her second title of the year and 24th of her career.

==== Volleyball ====
- FIVB World Grand Prix Third round: (teams in **bold** advance to the final round)
  - Pool I in Hong Kong:
    - Dominican Republic 3–2 Kazakhstan
    - **China** 3–0 Poland
  - Pool J in Hong Kong:
    - **United States** 3–0 Peru
    - Germany 0–3 **Italy**
  - Pool K in Bangkok, Thailand:
    - Argentina 0–3 Cuba
    - **Brazil** 3–0 **Thailand**
  - Pool L in Tokyo, Japan:
    - **Serbia** 3–0 South Korea
    - **Japan** 3–0 **Russia**
      - Final standings: Brazil 27 points, United States 23, Russia 21, Serbia 20, Italy 19, Japan 18, China 17, Thailand 15, South Korea, Poland 13, Cuba 9, Dominican Republic 8, Germany 7, Argentina 4, Kazakhstan 2, Peru 0.
- Women's African Championship in Nairobi, Kenya: (teams in **bold** advance to the semifinals)
  - Group A:
    - Cameroon 3–0 Nigeria
    - **Egypt** 1–3 **Kenya**
      - Final standings: Kenya 6 points, Egypt 5, Cameroon 4, Nigeria 3.
  - Group B:
    - Tunisia 2–3 **Senegal**
    - Rwanda 0–3 **Algeria**
      - Final standings: Algeria 8 points, Senegal 7, Tunisia 6, Botswana 5, Rwanda 4.
- FIVB Girls Youth World Championship in Ankara, Turkey:
  - 3rd place match: (bronze) **Serbia** 3–0 Poland
  - Final: (gold) **Turkey** 3–0 (silver) China
    - Turkey win the title for the first time.

=== August 20, 2011 (Saturday) ===
==== Auto racing ====
- Nationwide Series:
  - NAPA Auto Parts 200 in Montreal: (1) (Australia) Marcos Ambrose (Ford; Richard Petty Motorsports) (2) (Canada) Alex Tagliani (Dodge; Penske Racing) (3) (Arizona) Michael McDowell (Toyota; Joe Gibbs Racing)
    - Drivers' championship standings (after 24 of 34 races): (1) (Mississippi) Ricky Stenhouse Jr. (Ford; Roush Fenway Racing) 834 points (2) (Virginia) Elliott Sadler (Chevrolet; Kevin Harvick Incorporated) 826 (3) (Georgia (U.S. state)) Reed Sorenson (Chevrolet; Turner Motorsports) 825
- V8 Supercars:
  - Ipswich 300 in Ipswich, Queensland:
    - Race 16: (1) Craig Lowndes (AUS) (Triple Eight Race Engineering; Holden VE Commodore) (2) Tim Slade (AUS) (James Rosenberg Racing; Ford FG Falcon) (3) Jamie Whincup (AUS) (Triple Eight Race Engineering; Holden VE Commodore)
    - Race 17: (1) Lowndes (2) Whincup (3) Slade
      - Drivers' championship standings (after 17 of 28 races): (1) Whincup 1817 points (2) Lowndes 1647 (3) Shane van Gisbergen (NZL) (Stone Brothers Racing; Ford FG Falcon) 1398

==== Basketball ====
- FIBA Africa Championship in Antananarivo, Madagascar:
  - Group B:
    - Chad 57–89 Morocco
    - Angola 78–85 Senegal
      - Standings (after 2 games): Senegal 4 points, Angola, Morocco 3, Chad 2.
  - Group D:
    - Togo 57–82 Central African Republic
    - Tunisia 69–37 Rwanda
      - Standings (after 2 games): Tunisia, Central African Republic 4 points, Rwanda, Togo 2.

==== Canoeing ====
- Sprint World Championships in Szeged, Hungary:
  - Men's Canoe:
    - C–1 500 m: (gold) Vladimir Fedosenko (RUS) 1:46.647 (silver) Dzianis Harazha (BLR) 1:46.827 (bronze) Oleksandr Maksymchuk (UKR) 1:47.679
    - C–2 1000 m: (gold) Germany (Stefan Holtz, Tomasz Wylenzek) 2:42.643 (silver) Azerbaijan (Sergiy Bezugliy, Maksym Prokopenko) 2:43.525 (bronze) Romania (Alexandru Dumitrescu, Victor Mihalachi) 2:43.83
      - Wylenzek wins the event for the fourth time and his fifth world title overall.
  - Men's Kayak:
    - K–1 500 m: (gold) Marek Twardowski (POL) 1:36.688 (silver) Pavel Miadzvedzeu (BLR) 1:37.174 (bronze) Yury Postrigay (RUS) 1:38.404
      - Twardowski wins the event for the second time and his third world title overall.
    - K–2 500 m: (gold) Hungary (Dávid Tóth, Tamás Kulifai) 1:28.134 (silver) Lithuania (Ricardas Nekriosius, Andrej Olijnik) 1:28.524 (bronze) Poland (Denis Ambroziak, Dawid Putto) 1:28.848
    - K–4 1000 m: (gold) Germany (Norman Bröckl, Robert Gleinert, Max Hoff, Paul Mittelstedt) 2:47.734 (silver) Australia (Jacob Clear, Murray Stewart, David Smith, Tate Smith) 2:48.724 (bronze) Russia (Ilya Medvedev, Anton Vasilev, Anton Ryakhov, Oleg Zhestkov) 2:49.516
      - Bröckl wins the event for the third time.
      - Hoff wins his third world title.
  - Women's canoe:
    - C–2 500 m: (gold) Canada (Laurence Vincent-Lapointe, Mallorie Nicholson) 2:01.028 (silver) Russia (Anastasia Ganina, Natalia Marasanova) 2:03.440 (bronze) Hungary (Kincső Takács, Gyöngyvér Baravics) 2:08.534
      - Vincent-Lapointe wins her second world title.
  - Women's Kayak:
    - K–1 500 m: (gold) Nicole Reinhardt (GER) 1:47.066 (silver) Danuta Kozák (HUN) 1:47.396 (bronze) Inna Osypenko-Radomska (UKR) 1:48.668
      - Reinhardt wins the event for the second time and her seventh world title overall.
    - K–2 500 m: (gold) Austria (Yvonne Schuring, Viktoria Schwarz) 1:37.071 (silver) Germany (Franziska Weber, Tina Dietze) 1:37.275 (bronze) Poland (Beata Mikołajczyk, Aneta Konieczna) 1:37.803

==== Cricket ====
- India in England:
  - 4th Test in London, day 3: England 591/6d (153 overs; Ian Bell 235); India 103/5 (33 overs). India trail by 488 runs with 5 wickets remaining in the 1st innings.
- Australia in Sri Lanka:
  - 4th ODI in Hambantota: Sri Lanka 132 (38.4 overs); Australia 133/5 (28 overs). **Australia win by 5 wickets; lead 5-match series 3–1.**

==== Cycling ====
- Grand Tours:
  - Vuelta a España, Stage 1: (gold) Leopard Trek 16' 30" (silver) Liquigas–Cannondale + 4" (bronze) HTC–Highroad + 9"
    - General classification (after stage 1): (1) Jakob Fuglsang (DEN) (Leopard Trek) 16' 30" (2) Fabian Cancellara (SUI) (Leopard Trek) + 0" (3) Maxime Monfort (BEL) (Leopard Trek) + 0"

==== Equestrianism ====
- European Dressage Championship in Rotterdam, Netherlands:
  - Grand Prix Spécial: (gold) Adelinde Cornelissen (NED) on Parzival (silver) Carl Hester (GBR) on Uthopia (bronze) Laura Bechtolsheimer (GBR) on Mistral Hojris

==== Field hockey ====
- Men's EuroHockey Nations Championship in Mönchengladbach, Germany:
  - Pool A:
    - Germany 3–1 Belgium
    - Spain 5–0 Russia
- Women's EuroHockey Nations Championship in Mönchengladbach, Germany:
  - Pool A:
    - Spain 4–0 Italy
    - Netherlands 8–0 Azerbaijan
  - Pool B:
    - Germany 3–0 Ireland
    - England 4–0 Belgium

==== Football (soccer) ====
- FIFA U-20 World Cup in Bógota, Colombia:
  - Third place match: (bronze) **Mexico** 3–1 France
  - Final: (gold) **Brazil** 3–2 (a.e.t.) (silver) Portugal
    - Brazil win the title for the fifth time.
- (United States) Women's Professional Soccer Playoffs:
  - Super Semifinal in Chester, Pennsylvania: **Philadelphia Independence** 2–0 magicJack

==== Golf ====
- Senior majors:
  - Constellation Energy Senior Players Championship in Harrison, New York:
    - Leaderboard after third round: (1) Fred Couples (USA) 202 (−11) (T2) John Cook (USA) & Peter Senior (AUS) 203 (−10)

==== Multi-sport events ====
- Summer Universiade in Shenzhen, China:
  - Athletics:
    - Men's pole vault: (gold) Łukasz Michalski (POL) 5.75m (silver) Mateusz Didenkow (POL) & Aleksandr Gripich (RUS) 5.75m
    - Men's 3000m steeplechase: (gold) Alberto Paulo (POR) 8:32.26 (silver) Halil Akkaş (TUR) 8:34.57 (bronze) Ildar Minshin (RUS) 8:34.86
    - Men's 110m hurdles: (gold) Hansle Parchment (JAM) 13.24 (silver) Jiang Fan (CHN) 13.55 (bronze) Ronald Brookins (USA) 13.56
    - Women's triple jump: (gold) Yekaterina Koneva (RUS) 14.25m (silver) Patrícia Mamona (POR) 14.23m (bronze) Cristina Ioana Bujin (ROM) 14.21m
    - Women's shot put: (gold) Irina Tarasova (RUS) 18.02m (silver) Sophie Kleeberg (GER) 17.48m (bronze) Meng Qianqian (CHN) 17.21m
    - Women's 5000m: (gold) Binnaz Uslu (TUR) 15:41.15 (silver) Sara Moreira (POR) 15:45.83 (bronze) Natalya Popkova (RUS) 15:52.55
    - Women's heptathlon: (gold) Olga Kurban (RUS) 6151 points (silver) Viktorija Žemaitytė (LTU) 5958 (bronze) Kateřina Cachová (CZE) 5873
  - Cycling:
    - Men's team time trial: (gold) Russia (Sergey Shilov, Valery Kaykov, Artur Ershov, Maksim Kozyrev) 55:10.92 (silver) Germany (Christoph Pfingsten, Grischa Janorschke, Mathias Belka, Daniel Westmattelmann) 57:55.77 (bronze) South Korea (Jang Chan-jae, Jang Sun-jae, Park Sung-baek, Im Jae-yeon) 58:34.19
    - Women's team time trial: (gold) Lithuania (Egle Zablockyte, Aušrinė Trebaitė, Aleksandra Sošenko) 39:40.79 (silver) South Korea (Son Hee-jung, Yu Seon-ha, Lee Ae-jung) 40:26.37 (bronze) Germany (Lina-Kristin Schink, Romy Kasper, Jana Schemmer) 41:04.07
  - Diving:
    - Women's 3m springboard: (gold) He Zi (CHN) 384.70 points (silver) Wang Han (CHN) 370.00 (bronze) Paola Espinosa (MEX) 323.60
  - Golf:
    - Men's individual tournament: (gold) Hideki Matsuyama (JPN) (silver) Yoshinori Fujimoto (JPN) (bronze) Andrea Bolognesi (ITA)
    - Men's team tournament: (gold) Japan (Fujimoto, Hideto Kobukuro, Matsuyama, Shinji Tomimura) (silver) Italy (Bolognesi, Leonardo Motta, Niccolo Quintarelli, Lorenzo Scotto) (bronze) Mexico (Mauricio Azcué, Rodolfo Cazaubón, Carlos Ortiz, Gerardo Ruiz de la Concha)
    - Women's individual tournament: (gold) Lin Tzu-chi (TPE) (silver) Katerina Ruzickova (CZE) (bronze) Ko Min-jeong (KOR)
    - Women's team tournament: (gold) Chinese Taipei (Lin, Liu Yi-chen, Yao Hsuan-yu) (silver) China (Li Jiayun, Xu Yue, Zhang Yuyang) (bronze) United States (Brooke Beeler, Catherine O'Donnell, Caroline Powers)
  - Gymnastics:
    - Aerobic dance: (gold) China (Che Lei, Huang Jinxuan, Lin Junxian, Liu Chao, Shou Minchao, Tao Le, Wang Yang, Zhao Sitong, Zheng Ziya, Zou Qin) 19.163 (silver) Romania (Andreea Bogati, Laura Andreea Cristache, Valentin Mavrodineanu, Porime-Tolan Petru, Anca Claudia Surdu, Mircea Zamfir) 19.063 (bronze) South Korea (Hwang In Chan, Kim Eung-soo, Kim Sung-ho, Lee Jon-gu, Lee Kyung-ho, Ryu Ju-sun, Song Sung-kyu, Yoon Chang-il, Yoon Kwang-seok, Yun Tae-hee) 18.950
    - Mixed pair: (gold) Huang/Tao 21.000 (silver) Maxim Grinin/Evgeniya Kudymova (RUS) 21.000 (bronze) Giulia Bianchi/Emanuele Pagliuca (ITA) 20.250
  - Sailing:
    - Team 470: (gold) Russia (Vladimir Chaus, Denis Gribanov, Alisa Kirilyuk, Liudmila Dmitrieva) (silver) United States (Perry Emsiek, Scott Furnary, Zeke Horowitz, Alyssa Aitken) (bronze) Brazil (Gustavo Thiesen, Fábio Silva, Isabel Swan, Martine Grael)
    - Team laser radial: (gold) United States (Colin Smith, Frederick Strammer, Elizabeth Barry) (silver) Australia (Alexandra South, Tristan Brown, James Burman) (bronze) France (Mathilde de Kerangat, Jules Ferrer, Antony Munos)
    - Team T-293: (gold) China (Xie Lidiao, Chen Zhiwei)
  - Shooting:
    - Men's 50m rifle prone: (gold) Yury Shcherbatsevich (BLR) (silver) Cao Yifei (CHN) (bronze) Alexandr Yermakov (KAZ)
    - Men's 10m air pistol: (gold) Lee Dae-myung (KOR) (silver) Pang Wei (CHN) (bronze) Kim Geun-bok (KOR)
    - Men's team 10m air pistol: (gold) South Korea (silver) China (bronze) Russia
    - Women's 10m air pistol: (gold) Harveen Srao (IND) (silver) Tanyaporn Prucksakorn (THA) (bronze) Olena Kostevych (UKR)
    - Women's team 10m air pistol: (gold) India (Srao, Juhi Talwar, Ruby Tomar) 1140+30 (silver) Russia (Liubov Yaskevich, Alina Suslonova, Elena Kovalevskaya) 1136+32 (bronze) Ukraine (Kostevych, Yuliya Korostylova, Inna Kryachko) 1134+31
    - Women's team 50m rifle 3 positions: (gold) China (silver) France (bronze) Czech Republic
    - Women's skeet: (gold) Monika Zemkova (SVK) 96+5 (silver) Danka Barteková (SVK) 96+4 (bronze) Yu Xiumin (CHN) 94
    - Women's team skeet: (gold) China (Yu, Yang Jing, Lu Min) 204 (silver) Kazakhstan (Elvira Akchurina, Zhaniya Aidarkhanova, Angelina Michshuk) 200 (bronze) Russia (Landysh Garaeva, Albina Shakirova, Anastasia Kitaeva) 197
  - Table tennis (CHN unless stated):
    - Men's singles: (gold) Xu Xin (silver) Yan An (bronze) Fang Bo & Kenji Matsudaira (JPN)
    - Women's singles: (gold) Rao Jingwen (silver) Fan Ying (bronze) Ma Yuefei & Xiong Xinyun
  - Taekwondo:
    - Men's −54 kg: (gold) Jerranat Nakaviroj (THA) (silver) Hsu Chia-lin (TPE) (bronze) Erdal Aldemir (TUR) & Park Yong-han (KOR)
    - Men's −68 kg: (gold) Kim Hun (KOR) (silver) Samuel Morrison (PHI) (bronze) Idulio Islas (MEX) & Cesar Mari (ESP)
    - Women's −46 kg: (gold) Anastasia Valueva (RUS) (silver) Rukiye Yıldırım (TUR) (bronze) Liao Wei-chun (TPE) & Itzel Adilene Manjarrez Bastidas (MEX)
    - Women's −57 kg: (gold) Marlène Harnois (FRA) (silver) Hou Yuzhuo (CHN) (bronze) Ekaterina Musikhina (RUS) & Kim So-hee (KOR)
  - Tennis:
    - Men's doubles: (gold) Hsieh Cheng-peng/Lee Hsin-han (TPE) (silver) Siarhei Betau/Aliaksander Bury (BLR) (bronze) Lim Yong-kyu/Seol Jae-min (KOR) & David Estruch/Pablo-Manuel Montoro-Gimenez (ESP)
    - Women's doubles: (gold) Shuko Aoyama/Kotomi Takahata (JPN) (silver) Guo Lu/Li Ting (CHN) (bronze) Valeria Pulido/Leticia Nazari (MEX) & Kesnia Lykina/Marta Sirotkina (RUS)

==== Rugby union ====
- Tri Nations Series:
  - Match 5: South Africa 18–5 New Zealand
    - Standings: New Zealand, Australia 9 points (3 matches), South Africa 5 (4).
- Mid-year Tests, Week 7:
  - Ireland 22–26 France
  - Scotland 23–12 Italy
  - Wales 28–13 Argentina

==== Volleyball ====
- FIVB World Grand Prix Third round: (teams in **bold** advance to the final round)
  - Pool I in Hong Kong:
    - Dominican Republic 3–1 Poland
    - **China** 3–1 Kazakhstan
  - Pool J in Hong Kong:
    - Germany 3–1 Peru
    - **United States** 3–0 Italy
  - Pool K in Bangkok, Thailand:
    - **Brazil** 3–0 Argentina
    - Cuba 1–3 Thailand
  - Pool L in Tokyo, Japan:
    - **Russia** 3–2 **Serbia**
    - Japan 3–0 South Korea
      - Standings (after 8 matches): Brazil 24 points, Russia 21, United States 20, Serbia 17, Italy 16, Thailand, Japan 15, China 14, South Korea, Poland 13, Germany 7, Dominican Republic, Cuba 6, Argentina 4, Kazakhstan 1, Peru 0.
- Women's African Championship in Nairobi, Kenya: (teams in **bold** advance to the semifinals)
  - Group A: **Kenya** 3–0 Cameroon
    - Standings (after 2 matches): Kenya, **Egypt** 4 points, Cameroon, Nigeria 2.
  - Group B:
    - Botswana 3–1 Rwanda
    - Tunisia 2–3 **Algeria**
      - Standings: Algeria 6 points (3 matches), Senegal, Tunisia 5 (3), Botswana 5 (4), Rwanda 3 (3).

=== August 19, 2011 (Friday) ===
==== Basketball ====
- FIBA Africa Championship in Antananarivo, Madagascar:
  - Group A:
    - Mozambique 63–78 Nigeria
    - Madagascar 63–74 Mali
      - Standings (after 2 games): Nigeria 4 points, Mozambique, Mali 3, Madagascar 2.
  - Group C:
    - South Africa 65–87 Cameroon
    - Ivory Coast 75–82 Egypt
      - Standings (after 2 games): Cameroon 4 points, Egypt, Côte d'Ivoire 3, South Africa 2.

==== Canoeing ====
- Sprint World Championships in Szeged, Hungary:
  - Men's Canoe:
    - C–1 1000 m: (gold) Attila Vajda (HUN) 4:04.749 (silver) David Cal (ESP) 4:06.045 (bronze) Vadim Menkov (UZB) 4:08.151
      - Vajda wins the event for the second time.
    - C–2 500 m: (gold) Romania (Alexandru Dumitrescu, Victor Mihalachi) 1:45.524 (silver) Azerbaijan (Sergiy Bezugliy, Maksym Prokopenko) 1:46.178 (bronze) Germany (Peter Kretschmer, Kurt Kuschela) 1:46.802
      - Dumitrescu and Mihalachi win the event for the second time and their third world title overall.
    - C–4 1000 m: (gold) Belarus (Dzmitry Rabchanka, Dzmitry Vaitsishkin, Dzianis Harazha, Aleksandr Vauchetskiy) 3:26.703 (silver) Romania (Gabriel Gheoca, Cătălin Costache, Florian Comanici, Mihail Simon) 3:28.071 (bronze) Hungary (Mátyás Sáfrán, Mihály Sáfrán, Henrik Vasbányai, Szabolcs Németh) 3:28.113
      - The Belarusian quartet win the event for the third successive time, and all of them win their fifth world title overall.
  - Men's Kayak:
    - K–1 1000 m: (gold) Adam van Koeverden (CAN) 3:36.194 (silver) Anders Gustafsson (SWE) 3:39.488 (bronze) Eirik Verås Larsen (NOR) 3:39.818
      - van Koeverden wins his second world title.
    - K–2 1000 m: (gold) Slovakia (Peter Gelle, Erik Vlček) 3:20.626 (silver) Sweden (Markus Oscarsson, Henrik Nilsson) 3:21.478 (bronze) Russia (Vitaly Yurchenko, Vasily Pogrebn) 3:21.544
      - Vlček wins his seventh world title.
  - Women's Kayak:
    - K–1 1000 m: (gold) Tamara Csipes (HUN) 4:11.388 (silver) Krisztina Fazekas Zur (USA) 4:13.470 (bronze) Naomi Flood (AUS) 4:14.124
      - Csipes wins her third world title.
    - K–2 1000 m: (gold) Germany (Anne Knorr, Debora Niche) 3:50.614 (silver) Bulgaria (Berenike Faldum, Daniela Nedeva) 3:50.950 (bronze) Hungary (Alíz Sarudi, Erika Medveczky) 3:53.416
    - K–4 500 m: (gold) Hungary (Gabriella Szabó, Danuta Kozák, Katalin Kovács, Dalma Benedek) 1:36.339 (silver) Germany (Carolin Leonhardt, Silke Hörmann, Franziska Weber, Tina Dietze) 1:37.521 (bronze) Belarus (Iryna Pamialova, Nadzeya Papok, Volha Khudzenka, Maryna Paltaran) 1:37.887
      - Kovács wins the event for the eighth time, and her 30th world title overall. She also becomes the most decorated paddler with 39 world championships medals.
      - Benedek wins the event for the third successive time and her seventh world title overall.
      - Kozák wins the event for the second time and her fourth world title overall.
      - Szabó wins her fourth world title.

==== Cricket ====
- India in England:
  - 4th Test in London, day 2: England 457/3 (123 overs; Ian Bell 181*, Kevin Pietersen 175); India.
- Bangladesh in Zimbabwe:
  - 4th ODI in Bulawayo: Zimbabwe 199 (48.2 overs; Brendan Taylor 106); Bangladesh 203/4 (36.4 overs). **Bangladesh win by 6 wickets; Zimbabwe lead 5-match series 3–1.**

==== Golf ====
- Senior majors:
  - Constellation Energy Senior Players Championship in Harrison, New York:
    - Leaderboard after second round: (1) Fred Couples (USA) 134 (−8) (2) Peter Senior (AUS) 135 (−7) (3) Corey Pavin (USA) 136 (−6)

==== Multi-sport events ====
- Summer Universiade in Shenzhen, China:
  - Athletics:
    - Men's 400m hurdles: (gold) Jeshua Anderson (USA) 49.03 (silver) Takayuki Kishimoto (JPN) 49.52 (bronze) Kurt Couto (MOZ) 49.61
    - Men's javelin throw: (gold) Fatih Avan (TUR) 83.79m (silver) Roman Avramenko (UKR) 81.42m (bronze) Igor Janik (POL) 79.65m
    - Men's 200m: (gold) Rasheed Dwyer (JAM) 20.20 (silver) Thuso Mpuang (RSA) & Jason Young (JAM) 20.59
    - Women's 20 km walk: (gold) Júlia Takács (ESP) 1:33:51 (silver) Tatyana Shemyakina (RUS) 1:34:23 (bronze) Nina Okhotnikova (RUS) 1:35:10
    - Women's team 20 km walk: (gold) China (Shi Yang, Yang Yawei, Wang Shanshan) 4:58:57
    - Women's hammer throw: (gold) Zalina Marghieva (MDA) 72.93m (silver) Éva Orbán (HUN) 71.33m (bronze) Bianca Perie (ROM) 71.18m
    - Women's pole vault: (gold) Aleksandra Kiryashova (RUS) 4.65m (silver) Tina Šutej (SLO) 4.55m (bronze) Katerina Stefanidi (GRE) 4.45m
    - Women's 200m: (gold) Anneisha McLaughlin (JAM) 22.54 (silver) Tiffany Townsend (USA) 22.96 (bronze) Anna Kaygorodova (RUS) 23.16
    - Women's 100m hurdles: (gold) Nia-Sifaatihii Ali (USA) 12.85 (silver) Natalya Ivoninskaya (KAZ) 13.16 (bronze) Christina Manning (USA) 13.17
    - Women's 3000m steeplechase: (gold) Binnaz Uslu (TUR) 9:33.50 (silver) Ludmina Kuzmina (RUS) 9:44.77 (bronze) Jin Yuan (CHN) 9:45.21
  - Beach volleyball:
    - Women's tournament: (gold) Karla Borger–Britta Büthe (GER) (silver) Heather Hughes–Emily Day (USA) (bronze) Elize Secomana–Agatha Bednarczur (BRA)
  - Cycling:
    - Men's keirin: (gold) Zhang Miao (CHN) (silver) Pavel Yakushevskiy (RUS) (bronze) Florian Vernay (FRA)
    - Women's points race: (gold) Lesya Kalytovska (UKR) 40 points (silver) Anastasia Chulkova (RUS) 37 (bronze) Minami Uwano (JPN) 32
  - Diving:
    - Men's 1m springboard: (gold) Lin Jin (CHN) 487.00 points (silver) Sun Zhiyi (CHN) 460.20 (bronze) Illya Kvasha (UKR) 454.55
    - Women's synchro 10m platform: (gold) Wang Xin/Chen Ruolin (CHN) 349.98 points (silver) Paola Espinosa/Tatiana Ortiz (MEX) 330.48 (bronze) Pandelela Rinong/Leong Mun Yee (MAS) 316.98
  - Shooting (CHN unless stated):
    - Men's 25m rapid fire pistol: (gold) Ding Feng (silver) Zhou Zhiguo (bronze) Li Yuehong
    - Men's 25m team rapid fire pistol: (gold) China (Ding, Li, Zhou) (silver) France (Boris Artaud, Fabrice Daumal, Thibaut Sauvage) (bronze) Russia (Rinat Ayupov, Dmitry Brayko, Ivan Stukachev)
    - Men's trap: (gold) Marco Panizza (ITA) 146 (silver) Jakub Trzebiński (POL) 144+1 (bronze) Simone Prosperi (ITA) 144
    - Men's team trap: (gold) Italy (Prosperi, Andrea Miotto, Panizza) 363 (silver) China (Li Yang, Liu Jie, Du Yu) 357 (bronze) Poland (Trzebiński, Łukasz Szum, Piotr Kowalczyk) 349
    - Men's 50m team rifle prone: (gold) Belarus (Yury Shcherbatsevich, Tsimafei Vyshynski, Illia Charheika) 1773+104 (silver) Mongolia (Bishrel Boldbaatar, Ganzorig Dondov, Nyantain Bayaraa) 1773+90 (bronze) Sweden (Philip Järpenby, Sam Andersson, Viktor Webeklint) 1769+92
    - Women's 50m rifle prone: (gold) Li Peijing (silver) Wang Chengyi (bronze) Marli Vlok (RSA)
    - Women's 50m team rifle prone: (gold) China (Wang, Lan Yuwen, Li) 1780+116 (silver) Russia (Daria Vdovina, Anna Sushko, Valentina Protasova) 1770+92 (bronze) Thailand (Ratchadaporn Plengsaengthong, Sununta Majchacheep, Vitchuda Pichitkanjanakul) 1768+90
  - Swimming:
    - Men's 50m freestyle: (gold) Lucio Spadaro (ITA) 22.30 (silver) Adam Small (USA) 22.31 (bronze) Shinri Shioura (JPN) 22.37
    - Men's 1500m freestyle: (gold) Rocco Potenza (ITA) 15:00.57 (silver) Yohsuke Miyamoto (JPN) 15:04.86 (bronze) Sergii Frolov (UKR) 15:06.17
    - Men's 4 × 100 m medley relay: (gold) Japan (Ryosuke Irie, Ryo Tateishi, Masayuki Kishida, Shioura) 3:35.02 (silver) United States (Rexford Tullius, Adam Klein, Tim Phillips, Jimmy Feigen) 3:37.92 (bronze) New Zealand (Gareth Kean, Glenn Snyders, Kurt Bassett, Matthew Stanley) 3:38.75
    - Women's 50m freestyle: (gold) Aleksandra Gerasimenya (BLR) 24.66 (silver) Darya Stepanyuk (UKR) 25.12 (bronze) Cate Campbell (AUS) 25.17
    - Women's 200m backstroke: (gold) Shiho Sakai (JPN) 2:09.75 (silver) Hilary Caldwell (CAN) 2:11.12 (bronze) Duane Da Rocha Marcé (ESP) 2:11.24
    - Women's 100m breaststroke: (gold) Sun Ye (CHN) 1:07.53 (silver) Tera van Beilen (CAN) 1:08.24 (bronze) Satomi Suzuki (JPN) 1:08.45
  - Table tennis (CHN unless stated):
    - Men's doubles: (gold) Xu Xin/Yan An (silver) Wang Yi-tse/Chen Chien-an (TPE) (bronze) Shang Kun/Fang Bo & Jin Ueda/Kenji Matsudaira (JPN)
    - Women's doubles: (gold) Ma Yuefei/Rao Jingwen (silver) Xiong Xinyun/Tang Liying (bronze) Iveta Vacenovská/Dana Hadačová (CZE) & Jee Min-hyung/Moon Mi-ra (KOR)
  - Taekwondo:
    - Men's team poomsae: (gold) South Korea (An Jae-seong, Jang Jun-hee, Lee Sang-mok) (silver) China (Guo Fan, Zhu Yuxiang, Zhan Wenpeng) (bronze) Iran (Hossein Beheshti, Hamid Nazarigharehchomagh, Armin Akbari) & Vietnam (Le Trung Anh, Le Hieu Nghia, Dinh Toan Nguyen)
    - Women's team poomsae: (gold) South Korea (Cho Sung-yae, Jung Seu-min, Kang Yu-jin) (silver) Iran (Nastaran Maleki Aderani, Mahsa Mardani, Golsoum Mollamadadkhani) (bronze) China (Zhan Qi, Zhang Jingjing, Zhu Mengxue) & Vietnam (Thi Le Kim Nguyen, Thi Thu Ngan Nguyen, Van Chau Tuyet)
    - Mixed team poomsae: (gold) South Korea (Lee Jin-ho, Kang Su-ji) (silver) Vietnam (Thi Thu Ngan Nguyen, Le Hieu Nghia) (bronze) Germany (Claudia Beaujean, Thomas Sommer) & Mexico (Gerardo García, Ollin Medina)

==== Rugby union ====
- Mid-year Tests, Week 7: Fiji 20–32 Tonga

==== Volleyball ====
- FIVB World Grand Prix Third round: (teams in **bold** advance to the final round)
  - Pool I in Hong Kong:
    - Kazakhstan 0–3 Poland
    - **China** 3–0 Dominican Republic
  - Pool J in Hong Kong:
    - Italy 3–0 Peru
    - United States 3–0 Germany
  - Pool K in Bangkok, Thailand:
    - Cuba 0–3 **Brazil**
    - Thailand 3–0 Argentina
  - Pool L in Tokyo, Japan:
    - **Russia** 2–3 South Korea
    - Japan 0–3 Serbia
      - Standings (after 7 matches): Brazil 21 points, Russia 19, United States 17, Italy, Serbia 16, South Korea, Poland 13, Thailand, Japan 12, China 11, Cuba 6, Argentina, Germany 4, Dominican Republic 3, Kazakhstan 1, Peru 0.
- Women's African Championship in Nairobi, Kenya:
  - Group A: Egypt 3–0 Nigeria
    - Standings: Egypt 4 points (2 matches), Kenya 2 (1), Nigeria 2 (2), Cameroon 1 (1).
  - Group B:
    - Rwanda 0–3 Senegal
    - Botswana 1–3 Algeria
      - Standings: Senegal 5 points (3 matches), Algeria, Tunisia 4 (2), Botswana 3 (3), Rwanda 2 (2).

=== August 18, 2011 (Thursday) ===
==== Basketball ====
- FIBA Africa Championship in Antananarivo, Madagascar:
  - Group B:
    - Morocco 65–79 Senegal
    - Angola 115–56 Chad
  - Group D:
    - Tunisia 103–56 Togo
    - Central African Republic 89–61 Rwanda

==== Cricket ====
- India in England:
  - 4th Test in London, day 1: England 75/0 (26 overs); India.

==== Equestrianism ====
- European Dressage Championship in Rotterdam, Netherlands:
  - Team competition: (gold) Great Britain (Emile Faurie, Charlotte Dujardin, Carl Hester, Laura Bechtolsheimer) (silver) Germany (Helen Langehanenberg, Christoph Koschel, Isabell Werth, Matthias Alexander Rath) (bronze) Netherlands (Sander Marijnissen, Hans Peter Minderhoud, Edward Gal, Adelinde Cornelissen)

==== Football (soccer) ====
- UEFA Europa League Play-off round first leg:
  - Legia Warsaw (Poland) 2–2 (Russia) Spartak Moscow
  - Ekranas (Lithuania) 1–0 (Israel) Hapoel Tel Aviv
  - Lokomotiv Moscow (Russia) 2–0 (Slovakia) Spartak Trnava
  - Vaslui (Romania) 2–0 (Czech Republic) Sparta Prague
  - Zestafoni (Georgia (country)) 3–3 (Belgium) Club Brugge
  - HJK Helsinki (Finland) 2–0 (Germany) Schalke 04
  - Litex Lovech (Bulgaria) 1–2 (Ukraine) Dynamo Kyiv
  - Vorskla Poltava (Ukraine) 2–1 (Romania) Dinamo București
  - Aalesund (Norway) 2–1 (Netherlands) AZ
  - Omonia (Cyprus) 2–1 (Austria) Red Bull Salzburg
  - Austria Wien 3–1 (Romania) Gaz Metan Mediaș
  - Maccabi Tel Aviv (Israel) 3–0 (Greece) Panathinaikos
  - Steaua București (Romania) 2–0 (Bulgaria) CSKA Sofia
  - Thun (Switzerland) 0–1 (England) Stoke City
  - Beşiktaş (Turkey) 3–0 (Russia) Alania Vladikavkaz
  - Bursaspor (Turkey) 1–2 (Belgium) Anderlecht
  - PAOK (Greece) 2–0 (Ukraine) Karpaty Lviv
  - Nordsjælland (Denmark) 0–0 (Portugal) Sporting CP
  - Śląsk Wrocław (Poland) 1–3 (Romania) Rapid București
  - Standard Liège (Belgium) 1–0 (Sweden) Helsingborg
  - Metalist Kharkiv (Ukraine) 0–0 (France) Sochaux
  - Fulham (England) 3–0 (Ukraine) Dnipro Dnipropetrovsk
  - Hannover 96 (Germany) 2–1 (Spain) Sevilla
  - Red Star Belgrade (Serbia) 1–2 (France) Rennes
  - Shamrock Rovers (Republic of Ireland) 1–1 (Serbia) Partizan
  - Rosenborg (Norway) 0–0 (Cyprus) AEK Larnaca
  - Slovan Bratislava (Slovakia) 1–0 (Italy) Roma
  - Differdange 03 (Luxembourg) 0–4 (France) Paris Saint-Germain
  - Heart of Midlothian (Scotland) 0–5 (England) Tottenham Hotspur
  - Maribor (Slovenia) 2–1 (Scotland) Rangers
  - Nacional (Portugal) 0–0 (England) Birmingham City
  - AEK Athens (Greece) 1–0 (Georgia (country)) Dinamo Tbilisi
  - Athletic Bilbao (Spain) 0–0 (Turkey) Trabzonspor
  - Lazio (Italy) 6–0 (North Macedonia) Rabotnički
  - Celtic (Scotland) 0–0 (Switzerland) Sion
  - Ried (Austria) 0–0 (Netherlands) PSV Eindhoven
  - Atlético Madrid (Spain) 2–0 (Portugal) Vitória Guimarães
  - Braga (Portugal) 0–0 (Switzerland) Young Boys
- Copa Sudamericana First stage:
  - First leg: La Equidad (Colombia) 2–0 (Peru) Juan Aurich
  - Second leg (first leg score in parentheses): Fénix (Uruguay) 0–0 (0–1) **Universidad de Chile**. Universidad de Chile win 4–1 on points.
- CONCACAF Champions League group stage Matchday 1:
  - Group C: Tauro (Panama) 1–2 (Canada) Toronto FC

==== Golf ====
- Senior majors:
  - Constellation Energy Senior Players Championship in Harrison, New York:
    - Leaderboard after first round: (1) Jeff Sluman (USA) 65 (−6) (T2) Gary Hallberg (USA) & Peter Senior (AUS) 66 (−5)

==== Multi-sport events ====
- Summer Universiade in Shenzhen, China:
  - Archery:
    - Men's team compound: (gold) France (Sébastien Brasseur, Joanna Chesse, Pascale Lebecque) (silver) Mexico (Gerardo Alvarado, Angel Ramírez, Cuauhtémoc Rodríguez) (bronze) United States (Adam Gallant, Zachary Plannick, Adam Wruck)
    - Men's team recurve: (gold) China (Chang Liang, Liu Zhaowu, Ren Jinke) (silver) Japan (Shohei Ota, Hiroki Suetake, Hiroyuki Yoshinaga) (bronze) France (Thomas Aubert, Geoffrey Barthelot, Thomas Faucheron)
    - Women's team compound: (gold) South Korea (Kim Hyo-sun, Seo Jung-hee, Seok Ji-hyun) (silver) Russia (Natalia Avdeeva, Viktoria Balzhanova, Polina Nikitina) (bronze) India (Gagandeep Kaur, Anjali Kumari, Sunita Rani)
    - Women's team recurve: (gold) South Korea (Han Gyeong-hee, Jung Dasomi, Ki Bo-bae) (silver) Ukraine (Tetyana Dorokhova, Olena Kushniruk, Nina Mylchenko) (bronze) Chinese Taipei (Cho Pei-chin, Le Chieh-Ying, Yuan Shu-chi)
    - Mixed team compound: (gold) South Korea (Min Li-hong, Seo) (silver) United States (Kendal Nicely, Plannick) (bronze) Italy (Anastasia Anastasio, Jacopo Polidori)
    - Mixed team recurve: (gold) South Korea (Ki, Kim Bub-min) (silver) Chinese Taipei (Tien Kang, Yuan) (bronze) Ukraine (Dmytro Hrachov, Mylchenko)
  - Athletics (RUS unless stated):
    - Men's 20 km walk: (gold) Andrey Krivov 1:24:15 (silver) Mikhail Ryzhov 1:24:26 (bronze) Andrés Chocho (ECU) 1:24:44
    - Men's team 20 km walk: (gold) Russia (Krivov, Ryzhov, Andrey Ruzavin) 4:19:19 (silver) China (Cai Zelin, Yu Wei, Niu Wenbin) 4:24:56
    - Men's 1500m: (gold) Imad Touil (ALG) 3:48.13 (silver) Abdelmadjed Touil (ALG) 3:48.24 (bronze) Valentin Smirnov 3:48.45
    - Men's high jump: (gold) Bohdan Bondarenko (UKR) 2.28m (silver) Wojciech Theiner (POL) 2.26m (bronze) Sergey Mudrov 2.24m
    - Men's 400m: (gold) Marcell Deák-Nagy (HUN) 45.50 (silver) Peter Matthews (JAM) 45.62 (bronze) Sean Wroe (AUS) 45.93
    - Men's triple jump: (gold) Nelson Évora (POR) 17.31m (silver) Viktor Kuznietsov (UKR) 16.89m (bronze) Yevgeniy Ektov (KAZ) 16.83m
    - Men's decathlon: (gold) Vasiliy Kharlamov 8166 points (silver) Gaël Quérin (FRA) 7857 (bronze) Mikhail Logvinenko 7835
    - Women's 400m hurdles: (gold) Hanna Yaroshchuk (UKR) 55.15 (silver) Irina Davydova 55.50 (bronze) Nagihan Karadere (TUR) 55.81
    - Women's 800m: (gold) Olha Zavhorodnya (UKR) 1:59.56 (silver) Elena Kofanova 1:59.94 (bronze) Liliya Lobanova (UKR) 2:00.42
    - Women's 400m: (gold) Olga Topilskaya 51.63 (silver) Yelena Migunova 51.77 (bronze) Olga Tereshkova (KAZ) 52.36
    - Women's javelin throw: (gold) Sunette Viljoen (RSA) 66.47m (silver) Marina Maximova 59.87m (bronze) Justine Robbeson (RSA) 59.78m
  - Badminton:
    - Mixed team: (gold) Indonesia (Ricky Widianto, Shendy Puspa Irawati, Senatria Agus Setia Putra, Bellaetrix Manuputty, Rian Agung Saputro, Angga Pratama, Komala Dewi, Jenna Gozali, Hera Desi Ana Rachmawati, Rendy Sugiarto, Afiat Yuris Wirawan) (silver) China (Li Tian, Chen Ni, Wen Kai, Shi Xiao Qian, Tao Xun, Chen Yulu, Hu Wenqing, Lin Qing, Liu Fang Hua, Ye Ao Ting) (bronze) Thailand (Savitree Amitrapai, Suppanyu Avihingsanon, Bodin Isara, Nitchaon Jindapol, Maneepong Jongjit, Chanida Julrattanamanee, Nessara Somsri, Prinyawat Thongnuam) & Chinese Taipei (Chang Hsin-yun, Cheng Shao-chieh, Chou Tien-chen, Fang Chieh-min, Hsieh Pei-chen, Hsueh Hsuan-yi, Lai Chia-wen, Lee Sheng-mu, Liao Min-chun, Pai Hsia-oma, Wang Pei-rong, Wu Chun-wei)
  - Beach volleyball:
    - Men's tournament: (gold) Michal Kadziola–Jakub Szalankiewicz (POL) (silver) Sergey Prokopyev–Yury Bogatov (RUS) (bronze) Sergiy Popov–Valeriy Samoday (UKR)
  - Cycling:
    - Men's points race: (gold) Artur Ershov (RUS) 47 points (silver) Bernhard Oberholzer (SUI) 36 (bronze) Choi Seung-woo (KOR) 26
    - Men's sprint: (gold) Denis Dmitriev (RUS) (silver) Pavel Yakushevskiy (RUS) (bronze) Zhang Miao (CHN)
    - Women's sprint: (gold) Guo Shuang (CHN) (silver) Victoria Baranova (RUS) (bronze) Virginie Cueff (FRA)
  - Diving:
    - Women's 10m platform: (gold) Paola Espinosa (MEX) 385.25 points (silver) Pandelela Rinong (MAS) 381.75 (bronze) Wang Xin (CHN) 370.55
  - Fencing:
    - Men's team foil: (gold) China (Lei Sheng, Huang Liangcai, Zhu Jun, Chen Min) (silver) Italy (Alessio Foconi, Tommaso Lari, Martino Minuto, Luca Simoncelli) (bronze) Russia (Aleksey Khovanskiy, Igor Zapozdaev, Artur Akhmatkhuzin), Dmitry Komissarov)
    - Women's team sabre: (gold) China (Chen Xiaodong, Xia Min, Li Fei, Yuan Tingting) (silver) Ukraine (Alina Komashchuk, Olena Khomrova, Olha Kharlan, Halyna Pundyk) (bronze) South Korea (Choi Soo-yeon, Kim Ji-yeon, Lee Ra-jin)
  - Shooting:
    - Men's 50m pistol individual: (gold) Lee Dae-myung (KOR) (silver) Damir Mikec (SRB) (bronze) Mai Jiajie (CHN)
    - Men's 50m pistol team: (gold) China (Mai, Pang Wei, Wang Zhiwei) 1678+28 points (silver) South Korea (Lee, Gil Yang-sup, Jang Ha-lim) 1670+26 (bronze) Poland (Tomasz Palamarz, Tomasz Wawrzonowski, Witosław Krzak) 1635+23
    - Men's 10m air rifle individual: (gold) Niccolò Campriani (ITA) (silver) Yu Jae Chul (KOR) (bronze) Gong Jiawei (CHN)
    - Men's 10m air rifle team: (gold) Italy (Campriani, Tommaso Leonardi, Giovanni Matraxia) 1786+137 (silver) China (Gong, Cao Yifei, Zhang Qiang) 1781+135 (bronze) Russia (Nazar Luginets, Andrey Konkov, Vladimir Tugushev) 1775+128
    - Women's 10m air rifle individual: (gold) Petra Zublasing (ITA) (silver) Lisa Ungerank (AUT) (bronze) Manuela Christel Felix (GER)
    - Women's 10m air rifle team: (gold) China (Wang Weiyang, Xie Jieqiong, Lan Yuwen) 1187+85 (silver) South Korea (Kim Sun-hwa, Jeong Gyung-suk, Choi Yoon-jung) 1181+90 (bronze) Russia (Daria Vdovina, Valentina Protasova, Anna Sushko) 1180+86
    - Women's trap: (gold) Jana Beckmann (GER) 94 (silver) Catherine Skinner (AUS) 93 (bronze) Kang Gee-eun (KOR) 92+2
  - Swimming:
    - Men's 400m individual medley: (gold) László Cseh (HUN) 4:12.67 (silver) Yuya Horihata (JPN) 4:13.66 (bronze) Will Harris (USA) 4:15.40
    - Men's 50m breaststroke: (gold) Glenn Snyders (NZL) 27.37 (silver) João Gomes Júnior (BRA) 27.60 (bronze) Mattia Pesce (ITA) 27.80
    - Men's 200m freestyle: (gold) Matthew McLean (USA) 1:47.44 (silver) Clement Lefert (FRA) 1:47.78 (bronze) Sho Uchida (JPN) 1:49.06
    - Women's 1500m freestyle: (gold) Haley Anderson (USA) 16:21.72 (silver) Melania Costa-Schmid (ESP) 16:21.79 (bronze) Lauren Boyle (NZL) 16:26.37
    - Women's 50m backstroke: (gold) Jennifer Connelly (USA) 27.92 (silver) Aleksandra Gerasimenya (BLR) 27.93 (bronze) Grace Loh (AUS) 28.37
    - Women's 200m butterfly: (gold) Jessica Dickons (GBR) 2:08.91 (silver) Natsumi Hoshi (JPN) 2:08.94 (bronze) Choi Hye-ra (KOR) 2:09.35
    - Women's 4 × 100 m medley relay: (gold) China (Gao Chang, Sun Ye, Lu Ying, Tang Yi) 3:59.15 (silver) United States (Connolly, Ann Chandler, Lyndsay DePaul, Megan Romano) 4:00.15 (bronze) Japan (Shiho Sakai, Satomi Suzuki, Tomoyo Fukuda, Yayoi Matsumoto) 4:00.98
  - Table tennis:
    - Mixed doubles: (gold) Shang Kun/Rao Jingwen (CHN) (silver) Kentaro Miuchi/Yuka Ishigaki (JPN) (bronze) Lee Jae-hun/Kim So-ri (KOR) & Huang Sheng-sheng/Huang Yi-hua (TPE)
  - Taekwondo:
    - Men's individual poomsae: (gold) Zhu Yuxiang (CHN) (silver) Yang Ju-min (KOR) (bronze) Dinh Toan Nguyen (VIE) & Ali Nadali Najafabadi (IRI)
    - Women's individual poomsae: (gold) Zhang Jingjing (CHN) (silver) Mahsa Mardani (IRI) (bronze) Park Ji-young (KOR) & Ollin Medina (MEX)
  - Weightlifting:
    - Men's 105 kg: (gold) Gennady Muratov (RUS) 400 kg (silver) Mykola Hordiychuk (UKR) 382 kg (bronze) Aleksey Lovchev (RUS) 375 kg
    - Men's +105 kg: (gold) Mohamed Masoud (EGY) 412 kg (silver) Péter Nagy (HUN) 412 kg (bronze) Oleg Proshak (UKR) 402 kg
    - Women's +75 kg: (gold) Anastasia Chernykh (RUS) 250 kg (silver) Alexandra Aborneva (KAZ) 247 kg (bronze) Daryna Goncharova (UKR) 245 kg

==== Volleyball ====
- Women's African Championship in Nairobi, Kenya:
  - Group A: Egypt 3–2 Cameroon
  - Group B:
    - Tunisia 3–1 Rwanda
    - Senegal 3–0 Botswana
      - Standings: Tunisia 4 points (2 matches), Senegal 3 (2), Algeria 2 (1), Botswana 2 (2), Rwanda 1 (1).

=== August 17, 2011 (Wednesday) ===
==== Basketball ====
- FIBA Africa Championship in Antananarivo, Madagascar:
  - Group A:
    - Nigeria 84–59 Mali
    - Madagascar 67–77 Mozambique
  - Group C:
    - Ivory Coast 105–53 South Africa
    - Cameroon 96–81 Egypt

==== Football (soccer) ====
- FIFA U-20 World Cup in Colombia:
  - Semifinals:
    - France 0–2 **Portugal** in Medellín
    - **Brazil** 2–0 Mexico in Pereira
- UEFA Champions League Play-off round first leg:
  - Wisła Kraków (Poland) 1–0 (Cyprus) APOEL
  - Maccabi Haifa (Israel) 2–1 (Belgium) Genk
  - Dinamo Zagreb (Croatia) 4–1 (Sweden) Malmö FF
  - Odense (Denmark) 1–0 (Spain) Villarreal
  - Bayern Munich (Germany) 2–0 (Switzerland) Zürich
- Copa Sudamericana First stage second leg: (first leg scores in parentheses)
  - **Nacional** (Paraguay) 1–0 (0–0) (Bolivia) San José. Nacional win 4–1 on points.
  - **LDU Quito** (Ecuador) 1–0 (1–1) (Venezuela) Yaracuyanos. LDU Quito win 4–1 on points.
- CONCACAF Champions League group stage Matchday 1:
  - Group B: Colorado Rapids (United States) 3–2 (El Salvador) Isidro Metapán
  - Group C: UNAM (Mexico) 0–1 (United States) FC Dallas
  - Group D: Herediano (Costa Rica) 0–5 (Mexico) Monterrey
- (Spain) Supercopa de España second leg (first leg score in parentheses): **Barcelona** 3–2 (2–2) Real Madrid. Barcelona win 5–4 on aggregate.
  - Barcelona win the Supercopa for the third consecutive year, and tenth time overall.
- (United States) Women's Professional Soccer Playoffs:
  - First round in Boca Raton, Florida: **magicJack** 3–1 Boston Breakers

==== Multi-sport events ====
- Summer Universiade in Shenzhen, China:
  - Archery (KOR unless stated):
    - Men's recurve individual: (gold) Im Dong-hyun (silver) Kim Woo-jin (bronze) Kim Bub-min
    - Women's recurve individual: (gold) Ki Bo-bae (silver) Jung Dasomi (bronze) Cho Pei-chin (TPE)
  - Athletics:
    - Men's hammer throw: (gold) Paweł Fajdek (POL) 78.14m (silver) Marcel Lomnický (SVK) 73.90m (bronze) Lorenzo Povegliano (ITA) 73.39m
    - Men's 100m: (gold) Jacques Harvey (JAM) 10.14 (silver) Rytis Sakalauskas (LTU) 10.14 (bronze) Su Bingtian (CHN) 10.27
    - Men's 10,000m: (gold) Suguru Osako (JPN) 28:42.83 (silver) Stephen Mokoka (RSA) 28:53.09 (bronze) Ahmed Tamri (MAR) 29:06.20
    - Women's long jump: (gold) Anna Nazarova (RUS) 6.72m (silver) Iuliia Pidluzhnaia (RUS) 6.56m (bronze) Melanie Bauschke (GER) 6.51m
    - Women's discus throw: (gold) Żaneta Glanc (POL) 63.99m (silver) Zinaida Sendriūtė (LTU) 62.49m (bronze) Svetlana Saykina (RUS) 60.81m
    - Women's 100m: (gold) Carrie Russell (JAM) 11.05 (silver) Khrystyna Stuy (UKR) 11.34 (bronze) Lina Grinčikaitė (LTU) 11.44
  - Cycling:
    - Men's individual pursuit: (gold) Sergei Shilov (RUS) 4:30.927 (silver) Artur Ershov (RUS) 4:33.128 (bronze) Jang Sun-jae (KOR) 4:26.229
    - Women's individual pursuit: (gold) Vilija Sereikaitė (LTU) 3:36.944 (silver) Lesya Kalytovska (UKR) 3:40.068 (bronze) Svitlana Halyuk (UKR) 3:41.003
  - Diving:
    - Men's 3m springboard: (gold) He Chong (CHN) 539.30 points (silver) Julian Sanchez Gallegos (MEX) 515.50 (bronze) Ilya Zakharov (RUS) 471.95
  - Fencing:
    - Men's épée team: (gold) Russia (Nikita Glazkov, Sergey Khodos, Alexander Velikanov, Vseslav Morgoev) (silver) France (Alex Fava, Virgile Marchal, Adrien Penso-Tsai, Alexandre Bardenet) (bronze) Hungary (Péter Szényi, Dániel Budai, Márk Hanczvikkel)
    - Women's foil team: (gold) Russia (Viktoria Kozyreva, Yuliya Biryukova, Kamilla Gafurzianova, Yulia Rashidova) (silver) Poland (Hanna Lyczbinska, Marta Lyczbinska, Katarzyna Kryczało, Karolina Chlewińska) (bronze) France (Berangere Genevois, Maëva Roulin, Ysaora Thibus, Clarisse Luminet)
  - Judo:
    - Men's team: (gold) Japan (Ryunosuke Haga, Ryohei Anai, Takeshi Ojitani, Masaru Momose, Yuito Yoshida, Toru Shishime, Tomohiro Kawakami, Yasuhiro Awano) (silver) France (Florent Urani, Antoine Jeannin, Thibault Dracius, Alexandre Iddir, Farid Ben Ali, Mathieu Thorel, Clement Delvert) (bronze) South Korea (Hong Suk-woong, Hwang Bo-bae, Song Soo-keun), Kim Won-jung, Kim Sung-min) & Ukraine (Andriy Burdun, Anatoliy Laskuta, Quedjau Nhabali, Ivan Iefanov, Vitaliy Popovych, Razmik Tonoyan, Oleksandr Sizov)
    - Women's team: (gold) Japan (Kanae Yamabe, Yuko Imai, Aya Ishiyama, Shori Hamada, Yuki Hashimoto, Kaori Kondo, Miki Tanaka, Megumi Ishikawa) (silver) China (Ye Meixin, Guan Chunming, Lin Meiling, Yu Song, Zhang Jie, Chen Rong) (bronze) France (Emilie Andeol, Hélène Receveaux, Valériane Etienne, Géraldine Mentouopou, Aurore Urani Climence, Elodie Grou, Heloise Lacouchie) & Poland (Joanna Jaworska, Agata Ozdoba, Zuzanna Pawlikowska, Agata Perenc, Katarzyna Furmanek)
  - Swimming:
    - Men's 100m butterfly: (gold) Tim Phillips (USA) 52.06 (silver) Tom Shields (USA) 52.62 (bronze) Paweł Korzeniowski (POL) 52.96
    - Men's 400m freestyle: (gold) David McKeon (AUS) 3:48.78 (silver) Michael Klueh (USA) 3:48.84 (bronze) Sho Uchida (JPN) 3:51.93
    - Men's 200m individual medley: (gold) László Cseh (HUN) 1:57.86 (silver) Yuya Horihata (JPN) 1:59.74 (bronze) Yuma Kosaka (JPN) 1:59.81
    - Women's 50m breaststroke: (gold) Ann Chandler (USA) 31.13 (silver) Tera van Beilen (CAN) 31.45 (bronze) Valentina Artemyeva (RUS) 31.74
    - Women's 100m butterfly: (gold) Lu Ying (CHN) 57.86 (silver) Tomoyo Fukuda (JPN) 59.08 (bronze) Alice Mills (AUS) 59.11
    - Women's 100m backstroke: (gold) Shiho Sakai (JPN) 1:00.28 (silver) Jennifer Connelly (USA) 1:00.50 (bronze) Aleksandra Gerasimenya (BLR) 1:00.91
    - Women's 4 × 200 m freestyle relay: (gold) United States (Karlee Bispo, Chelsea Nauta, Kate Dwelley, Megan Romano) 7:55.02 (silver) New Zealand (Natasha Hind, Melissa Ingram, Amaka Gessler, Lauren Boyle) 7:59.60 (bronze) China (Tang Yi, Zhu Qianwei, Liu Jing, Lu) 7:59.62
  - Weightlifting:
    - Men's 94 kg: (gold) Andrey Demanov (RUS) 390 kg (silver) Aurimas Didžbalis (LTU) 387 kg (bronze) İbrahim Arat (TUR) 373 kg
    - Women's 69 kg: (gold) Yue Kang (CHN) 240 kg (silver) Mun Yu-ra (KOR) 238 kg (bronze) Marie-Ève Beauchemin-Nadeau (CAN) 235 kg
    - Women's 75 kg: (gold) Khanittha Petanang (THA) 236 kg (silver) Yang Li (CHN) 234 kg (bronze) Lee Ae-ra (KOR) 226 kg

==== Volleyball ====
- Women's African Championship in Nairobi, Kenya:
  - Group A: Nigeria 0–3 Kenya
  - Group B:
    - Senegal 0–3 Algeria
    - Botswana 1–3 Tunisia

=== August 16, 2011 (Tuesday) ===
==== Cricket ====
- Bangladesh in Zimbabwe:
  - 3rd ODI in Harare: Zimbabwe 250/7 (50 overs); Bangladesh 245 (49.2 overs; Mushfiqur Rahim 101). **Zimbabwe win by 5 runs; lead 5-match series 3–0.**
- Australia in Sri Lanka:
  - 3rd ODI in Colombo: Sri Lanka 286/9 (50 overs; Upul Tharanga 111); Australia 208 (44.2 overs; Lasith Malinga 5/28). **Sri Lanka win by 78 runs; Australia lead 5-match series 2–1.**

==== Football (soccer) ====
- UEFA Champions League Play-off round first leg:
  - Copenhagen (Denmark) 1–3 (Czech Republic) Viktoria Plzeň
  - BATE Borisov (Belarus) 1–1 (Austria) Sturm Graz
  - Twente (Netherlands) 2–2 (Portugal) Benfica
  - Arsenal (England) 1–0 (Italy) Udinese
  - Lyon (France) 3–1 (Russia) Rubin Kazan
- Copa Sudamericana First stage second leg: (first leg scores in parentheses)
  - **Universidad Católica** (Chile) 3–0 (1–1) (Uruguay) Bella Vista. Universidad Católica win 4–1 on points.
  - **Deportivo Anzoátegui** (Venezuela) 2–0 (0–1) (Ecuador) Deportivo Quito. 3–3 on points; Deportivo Anzoátegui win 2–1 on aggregate.
- CONCACAF Champions League group stage Matchday 1:
  - Group A:
    - Los Angeles Galaxy (United States) 2–0 (Honduras) Motagua
    - Alajuelense (Costa Rica) 1–0 (Mexico) Morelia
  - Group B: Santos Laguna (Mexico) 3–2 (Honduras) Real España
  - Group D: Seattle Sounders FC (United States) 4–1 (Guatemala) Comunicaciones

==== Multi-sport events ====
- Summer Universiade in Shenzhen, China:
  - Archery:
    - Men's compound individual: (gold) Alexander Dambaev (RUS) (silver) Choi Yong-hee (KOR) (bronze) Sébastien Brasseur (FRA)
    - Women's compound individual: (gold) Polina Nikitina (RUS) (silver) Kendal Nicely (USA) (bronze) Viktoria Balzhanova (RUS)
  - Athletics:
    - Men's shot put: (gold) O'Dayne Richards (JAM) 19.93m (silver) Soslan Tsyrikhov (RUS) 19.80m (bronze) Mason Finley (USA) 19.72m
    - Women's 10,000m: (gold) Fadime Suna (TUR) 33:11.92 (silver) Hanae Tanaka (JPN) 33:15.57 (bronze) Mai Ishibashi (JPN) 33:41.90
  - Cycling:
    - Women's 500m time trial: (gold) Gong Jinjie (CHN) 34.910 (silver) Lyubov Shulika (UKR) 34.985 (bronze) Victoria Baranova (RUS) 34.996
  - Diving:
    - Men's synchro 3m springboard: (gold) China (Qin Kai, Lin Jin) 419.07 points (silver) Mexico (Rommel Pacheco, Jonathan Ruvalcaba) 385.32 (bronze) Japan (Yu Okamoto, Sho Sakai) 374.40
    - Women's 1m springboard: (gold) Shi Tingmao (CHN) 320.65 points (silver) Kelci Bryant (USA) 304.00 (bronze) Chen Ye (CHN) 283.30
  - Fencing:
    - Men's team sabre: (gold) Ukraine (Dmytro Boyko, Oleh Shturbabin, Andriy Yagodka, Dmytro Pundyk) (silver) Italy (Marco Tricarico, Massimiliano Murolo, Luigi Miracco, Stefano Sbragia) (bronze) South Korea (Heo Young-gu, Gu Bon-gil, Hwang Byung-yul)
    - Women's team épée: (gold) France (Melissa Goram, Lauren Rembi, Marie-Gabrielle Fayolle, Mathilde Grumier) (silver) United States (Courtney Hurley, Kelley Hurley, Susannah Scanlan, Holly Buechel) (bronze) Russia (Vlada Vlasova, Elena Shasharina, Tatiana Andryushina, Maya Guchmazova)
  - Gymnastics:
    - Men's floor: (gold) Flavius Koczi (ROM) 15.450 points (silver) Ryūzō Sejima (JPN) 15.225 (bronze) Shoichi Yamamoto (JPN) 15.000
    - Men's pommel horse: (gold) Prashanth Sellathurai (AUS) 15.700 points (silver) Donna-Donny Truyens (BEL) 15.175 (bronze) Koczi 15.150
    - Men's rings: (gold) Arthur Zanetti (BRA) 15.600 points (silver) Samir Aït Saïd (FRA) 15.500 (bronze) Chen Chih-yu (TPE) 15.050
    - Men's vault: (gold) Koczi 16.237 points (silver) Nathan Gafuik (CAN) 16.112 (bronze) Cheng Ran (CHN) 16.075
    - Men's parallel bars: (gold) Wang Guanyin (CHN) 15.850 points (silver) Marius Berbecar (ROM) & Liu Rongbing (CHN) 15.175
    - Men's horizontal bar: (gold) Chen Xuezhang (CHN) 15.875 points (silver) Mykola Kuksenkov (UKR) 15.550 (bronze) Hiroki Ishikawa (JPN) 15.500
    - Women's vault: (gold) Jo Hyun-joo (KOR) 14.087 points (silver) Anna Myzdrikova (RUS) 13.800 (bronze) Alena Polyan (RUS) & Wong Hiuyingangel (HKG) 13.650
    - Women's uneven bars: (gold) Yu Minobe (JPN) 14.475 points (silver) Mai Yamagishi (JPN) 14.250 (bronze) Angelina Kysla (UKR) 13.850
    - Women's beam: (gold) Minobe 14.475 points (silver) Guan Wenii (CHN) 14.000 (bronze) Yamagishi 13.825
    - Women's floor: (gold) Polyan 14.325 points (silver) Keiko Mukumoto (JPN) 13.725 (bronze) Xiao Kangjun (CHN) 13.475
  - Judo:
    - Women's −48 kg: (gold) Kaori Kondo (JPN) (silver) Kristina Rumyantseva (RUS) (bronze) Violeta Dumitru (ROM) & Aurore Urani Climence (FRA)
    - Men's −60 kg: (gold) Kim Won-jin (KOR) (silver) Chinbat Otgon (MGL) (bronze) Robert Mshvidobadze (RUS) & Toru Shishime (JPN)
    - Women's Open: (gold) Kim Ji-youn (KOR) (silver) Aya Ishiyama (JPN) (bronze) Claudirene César (BRA) & Emilie Andeol (FRA)
    - Men's Open: (gold) Kim Sung-min (KOR) (silver) Renat Saidov (RUS) (bronze) Masaru Momose (JPN) & David Moura (BRA)
  - Swimming:
    - Men's 50m backstroke: (gold) Ryosuke Irie (JPN) 25.11 (silver) Guy Barnea (ISR) 25.21 (bronze) Sergey Makov (RUS) 25.42
    - Women's 400m individual medley: (gold) Madeline Dirado (USA) 4:40.79 (silver) Miho Takahashi (JPN) 4:42.28 (bronze) Jördis Steinegger (AUT) 4:43.30
    - Men's 100m freestyle: (gold) Jimmy Feigen (USA) 49.26 (silver) Norbert Trandafir (ROM) 49.41 (bronze) Shinri Shioura (JPN) 49.50
    - Men's 100m breaststroke: (gold) Giedrius Titenis (LTU) 1:00.39 (silver) Glenn Snyders (NZL) 1:00.71 (bronze) João Gomes Júnior (BRA) 1:00.78
    - Women's 200m breaststroke: (gold) Sun Ye (CHN) 2:24.63 (silver) Andrea Kropp (USA) 2:26.18 (bronze) Satomi Suzuki (JPN) 2:26.67
    - Women's 200m freestyle: (gold) Melania Costa-Schmid (ESP) 1:57.98 (silver) Lauren Boyle (NZL) 1:59.19 (bronze) Karlee Bispo (USA) 1:59.31
    - Men's 4 × 200 m freestyle relay: (gold) United States (Michael Klueh, Daxon Hill, Matthew Bartlett, Matthew McLean) 7:13.54 (silver) Japan (Sho Sotodate, Yuya Horihata, Yuma Kosaka, Sho Uchida) 7:14.66 (bronze) Australia (David McKeon, Mitchell Dixon, Kristopher Taylor, Nic Ffrost) 7:17.58
  - Table tennis:
    - Men's team: (gold) China (Fang Bo, Hu Bingtao, Shang Kun, Xu Xin, Yan An) (silver) Japan (Ryusuke Karube, Hiromitsu Kasahara, Kenji Matsudaira, Kentaro Miuchi, Jin Ueda) (bronze) Chinese Taipei (Chen Chien-an, Fu En-ti, Huang Shang-sheng, Shen Chi-min, Wang Yi-tse) & France (Thomas Le Breton, Emmanuel Lebesson, Adrien Mattenet, Abdel-Kader Salifou)
    - Women's team: (gold) China (Fan Ying, Ma Yuefei, Rao Jingwen, Tang Liying, Xiong Xinyun) (silver) Japan (Yuko Fujii, Yuka Ishigaki, Marina Matsuzawa, Shiho Ono, Yuri Yamanashi) (bronze) Romania (Ioana Ghemes, Elisabeta Samara, Anamaria Sebe) & Chinese Taipei (Chen Szu-yu, Cheng I-ching, Huang Yi-hua, Lee I-chen, Liu Hsing-yin)
  - Weightlifting:
    - Women's 63 kg: (gold) Hsiao Chun-ho (TPE) 211 kg (silver) Kim Yun-jong (PRK) 207 kg (bronze) Seda Ince (TUR) 203 kg
    - Men's 85 kg: (gold) Rinat Kireev (RUS) 365 kg (silver) Zhang Shichong (CHN) 353 kg (bronze) Ryu Jun-h (KOR) 351 kg

=== August 15, 2011 (Monday) ===
==== Auto racing ====
- Sprint Cup Series:
  - Heluva Good! Sour Cream Dips at The Glen in Watkins Glen, New York: (1) (Australia) Marcos Ambrose (Ford; Richard Petty Motorsports) (2) (Michigan) Brad Keselowski (Dodge; Penske Racing) (3) (Nevada) Kyle Busch (Toyota; Joe Gibbs Racing)
    - Ambrose becomes the first Australian to win a Cup Series race.
    - Drivers' championship standings (after 22 of 36 races): (1) Busch 752 points (3 wins) (2) (Missouri) Carl Edwards (Ford; Roush Fenway Racing) 752 (1 win) (3) (California) Jimmie Johnson (Chevrolet; Hendrick Motorsports) 746

==== Baseball ====
- The Minnesota Twins' Jim Thome becomes the eighth player in Major League Baseball history with 600 career home runs, reaching the mark with a three-run shot off Daniel Schlereth in the Twins' 9–5 win over the Detroit Tigers.

==== Multi-sport events ====
- Summer Universiade in Shenzhen, China:
  - Cycling:
    - Men's cross country: (gold) Pavel Pryadein (RUS) 1h 30' 36" (silver) Silvio Büsser (SUI) + 1' 47" (bronze) Jiří Hudeček (CZE) + 2' 17"
    - Women's cross country: (gold) Ksenia Kirillova (RUS) 1h 12' 24" (silver) Maaris Meier (EST) + 1' 47" (bronze) Melanie Gay (SUI) + 7' 21"
  - Fencing:
    - Men's foil individual: (gold) Martino Minuto (ITA) (silver) Lei Sheng (CHN) (bronze) Zhu Jun (CHN) & Heo Jun (KOR)
    - Women's sabre individual: (gold) Olha Kharlan (UKR) (silver) Bianca Alexandra Pascu (ROM) (bronze) Au Yeung Wai Sum (HKG) & Kim Ji-yeon (KOR)
  - Gymnastics:
    - Men's individual all-around: (gold) Mykola Kuksenkov (UKR) 89.050 points (silver) Shoichi Yamamoto (JPN) 88.900 (bronze) Nathan Gafuik (CAN) 88.350
    - Women's individual all-around: (gold) Xiao Kangjun (CHN) 56.700 points (silver) Mai Yamagishi (JPN) 56.100 (bronze) Alena Polyan (RUS) 55.350
  - Judo:
    - Women's −52 kg: (gold) Zuzanna Pawlikowska (POL) (silver) Seo Ha Na (KOR) (bronze) Yuki Hashimoto (JPN) & Meriem Moussa (ALG)
    - Men's −66 kg: (gold) Hwang Bo-bae (KOR) (silver) Yuito Yoshida (JPN) (bronze) Florent Urani (FRA) & Ma Duanbin (CHN)
    - Women's −57 kg: (gold) Megumi Ishikawa (JPN) (silver) Kim Jan-di (KOR) (bronze) Hélène Receveaux (FRA) & Hannah Luise Brück (GER)
    - Men's −73 kg: (gold) Denis Yartsev (RUS) (silver) Kim Won-jung (KOR) (bronze) Marcelo Contini (BRA) & Piotr Kurkiewicz (POL)
  - Swimming:
    - Men's 50m butterfly: (gold) Tim Phillips (USA) 23.51 (silver) Paolo Facchinelli (ITA) 23.85 (bronze) Masayuki Kishida (JPN) 23.93
    - Women's 400m freestyle: (gold) Lauren Boyle (NZL) 4:07.78 (silver) Melania Costa-Schmid (ESP) 4:07.97 (bronze) Stephanie Peacock (USA) 4:10.25
    - Men's 800m freestyle: (gold) Michael Klueh (USA) 7:52.31 (silver) Rocco Potenza (ITA) 7:53.45 (bronze) Yohsuke Miyamoto (AUS) 7:56.29
    - Men's 100m backstroke: (gold) Gareth Kean (NZL) 54.71 (silver) Juan Miguel Rando (ESP) 54.94 (bronze) Kurt Bassett (NZL) & Sebastiano Ranfagni (ITA) 55.21
    - Women's 200m individual medley: (gold) Izumi Kato (JPN) 2:13.52 (silver) Choi Hye-ra (KOR) 2:14.17 (bronze) Liu Jing (CHN) 2:14.39
    - Women's 100m freestyle: (gold) Tang Yi (CHN) 54.24 (silver) Darya Stepanyuk (UKR) 55.32 (bronze) Megan Romano (USA) 55.38
    - Men's 4 × 100 m freestyle relay: (gold) United States (Jimmy Feigen, Phillips, Kohlton Norys, Robert Savulich) 3:15.84 (silver) Brazil (Marcos Macedo, Marcelo Chierighini, Henrique Martins, Nicolas Oliveira) 3:17.30 (bronze) France (Clement Lefert, Guillaume Strohmeyer, Joris Hustache, Lorys Bourelly) 3:18.78
  - Weightlifting:
    - Men's 69 kg: (gold) Deni (INA) 321 kg (silver) Won Jeong-sik (KOR) 318 kg (bronze) Mohamed Sultan (EGY) 312 kg
    - Women's 58 kg: (gold) O Jong-Ae (PRK) 220 kg (silver) Liqin Luo (CHN) 211 kg (bronze) Lara Monica Dominguez (MEX) 201 kg
    - Men's 77 kg: (gold) Aghasi Aghasyan (ARM) 337 kg (silver) Viacheslav Lastukhin (RUS) 332 kg (bronze) Victor Kravchenko (RUS) 331 kg

=== August 14, 2011 (Sunday) ===
==== Auto racing ====
- Sprint Cup Series:
  - Heluva Good! Sour Cream Dips at The Glen in Watkins Glen, New York: Postponed to 10:00 am EDT August 15 due to rain.
- IndyCar Series:
  - MoveThatBlock.com Indy 225 in Loudon, New Hampshire: (1) Ryan Hunter-Reay (USA) (Andretti Autosport) (2) Oriol Servià (ESP) (Newman/Haas Racing) (3) Scott Dixon (NZL) (Chip Ganassi Racing)
    - Drivers' championship standings (after 13 of 18 races): (1) Dario Franchitti (GBR) (Chip Ganassi Racing) 443 points (2) Will Power (AUS) (Team Penske) 396 (3) Dixon 370

==== Badminton ====
- World Championships in London, England:
  - Men's singles: **Lin Dan** (CHN) def. Lee Chong Wei (MYS) 20–22, 21–14, 23–21
    - Lin wins his fourth world title in six years.
  - Women's singles: **Wang Yihan** (CHN) def. Cheng Shao-chieh (TPE) 21–15, 21–10
    - Wang wins her first world title.
  - Men's doubles: **Cai Yun** (CHN)/**Fu Haifeng** (CHN) def. Ko Sung-hyun (KOR)/Yoo Yeon-seong (KOR) 24–22, 21–16
    - Cai and Fu win their fourth world title in six years.
  - Women's doubles: **Wang Xiaoli** (CHN)/**Yu Yang** (CHN) def. Tian Qing (CHN)/Zhao Yunlei (CHN) 22–20, 21–11
    - Wang and Yu both win their first world title.
  - Mixed doubles: **Zhang Nan** (CHN)/**Zhao Yunlei** (CHN) def. Chris Adcock (ENG)/Imogen Bankier (SCO) 21–15, 21–7
    - Zhang and Zhao both win their first world title.

==== Basketball ====
- FIBA Europe Under-18 Championship for Women in Oradea, Romania:
  - Bronze medal game: (bronze) **Spain** 85–69 Sweden
  - Final: (gold) **Belgium** 77–49 (silver) France
    - Belgium win the title for the first time.

==== Cricket ====
- Australia in Sri Lanka:
  - 2nd ODI in Colombo: Sri Lanka 208 (49.3 overs); Australia 211/2 (38.2 overs). **Australia win by 8 wickets; lead 5-match series 2–0.**
- Bangladesh in Zimbabwe:
  - 2nd ODI in Harare: Bangladesh 188 (47.3 overs; Brian Vitori 5/20); Zimbabwe 191/3 (44.1 overs). **Zimbabwe win by 7 wickets; lead 5-match series 2–0.**

==== Cycling ====
- UCI World Tour:
  - Eneco Tour, stage 6: (gold) Edvald Boasson Hagen (NOR) (Team Sky) 4h 53' 06" (silver) Manuel Antonio Cardoso (POR) (Team RadioShack) s.t. (bronze) Lars Boom (NED) (Rabobank) s.t.
    - Final general classification: (1) Boasson Hagen 22h 54' 22" (2) Philippe Gilbert (BEL) (Omega Pharma–Lotto) + 22" (3) David Millar (GBR) (Garmin–Cervélo) + 28"
    - UCI World Tour standings (after 20 of 27 races): (1) Cadel Evans (AUS) (BMC Racing Team) 574 points (2) Gilbert 568 (3) Alberto Contador (ESP) (Saxo Bank–SunGard) 471
- UCI Mountain Bike World Cup in Nové Město na Moravě, Czech Republic:
  - Men: (gold) Jaroslav Kulhavý (CZE) 1h 41' 52" (silver) Nino Schurter (SUI) + 45" (bronze) Julien Absalon (FRA) + 54"
  - Women: (gold) Catharine Pendrel (CAN) 1h 45' 23" (silver) Julie Bresset (FRA) + 59" (bronze) Irina Kalentieva (RUS) + 1' 49"

==== Football (soccer) ====
- FIFA U-20 World Cup in Colombia:
  - Quarter-finals:
    - **France** 3–2 (a.e.t.) Nigeria in Cali
    - **Brazil** 2–2 (4–2 pen.) Spain in Pereira
- CAF Champions League group stage, matchday 3:
  - Group A:
    - Enyimba (Nigeria) 2–0 (Morocco) Raja Casablanca
    - Al-Hilal (Sudan) 2–1 (Cameroon) Coton Sport
      - Standings (after 3 matches): Enyimba, Al-Hilal 7 points, Coton Sport, Raja Casablanca 1.
  - Group B: Wydad Casablanca (Morocco) 2–2 (Tunisia) Espérance ST
    - Standings (after 3 matches): Espérance ST, Wydad Casablanca 5 points, (Egypt) Al-Ahly 4, (Algeria) MC Alger 1.
- CAF Confederation Cup group stage, matchday 3:
  - Group A: ASEC Mimosas (Ivory Coast) 2–1 (Nigeria) Kaduna United
    - Standings (after 3 matches): (Tunisia) Club Africain 5 points, (Angola) Inter Luanda, ASEC Mimosas 4, Kaduna United 2.
- (Spain) Supercopa de España first leg: Real Madrid 2–2 Barcelona

==== Golf ====
- Men's majors:
  - PGA Championship in Johns Creek, Georgia, United States:
    - Leaderboard after final round: (T1) Keegan Bradley (USA) & Jason Dufner (USA) 272 (−8) (3) Anders Hansen (DEN) 273 (−7)
    - Three-hole playoff: Bradley 10 (−1) [3–3–4] def. Dufner 11 (E) [4–4–3]
      - Bradley wins in his first major championship appearance.
- U.S. Women's Amateur in Barrington, Rhode Island:
  - Final: **Danielle Kang** (USA) def. Moriya Jutanugarn (THA) 6 & 5
    - Kang becomes the first player since Kelli Kuehne (USA) to win consecutive titles.

==== Mixed martial arts ====
- UFC Live: Hardy vs. Lytle in Milwaukee, Wisconsin, United States:
  - Welterweight bout: **Chris Lytle** (USA) def. Dan Hardy (ENG) via submission (guillotine choke)
  - Lightweight bout: **Benson Henderson** (USA) def. Jim Miller (USA) via unanimous decision (30–27, 29–28, 30–26)
  - Lightweight bout: **Donald Cerrone** (USA) def. Charles Oliveira (BRA) via TKO (punches)
  - Welterweight bout: **Duane Ludwig** (USA) def. Amir Sadollah (USA) via unanimous decision (29–28, 29–28, 29–28)

==== Motorcycle racing ====
- Moto GP:
  - Czech Republic Grand Prix in Brno, Czech Republic:
    - MotoGP: (1) Casey Stoner (AUS) (Honda) (2) Andrea Dovizioso (ITA) (Honda) (3) Marco Simoncelli (ITA) (Honda)
      - Riders' championship standings (after 11 of 18 races): (1) Stoner 218 points (2) Jorge Lorenzo (ESP) (Yamaha) 186 (3) Dovizioso 163
    - Moto2: (1) Andrea Iannone (ITA) (Suter) (2) Marc Márquez (ESP) (Suter) (3) Stefan Bradl (GER) (Kalex)
      - Riders' championship standings (after 10 of 17 races): (1) Bradl 183 points (2) Márquez 140 (3) Alex de Angelis (SMR) (Motobi) 95
    - 125cc: (1) Sandro Cortese (GER) (Aprilia) (2) Johann Zarco (FRA) (Derbi) (3) Alberto Moncayo (ESP) (Aprilia)
      - Riders' championship standings (after 10 of 17 races): (1) Nicolás Terol (ESP) (Aprilia) 166 points (2) Zarco 154 (3) Maverick Viñales (ESP) (Aprilia) 132

==== Multi-sport events ====
- Summer Universiade in Shenzhen, China:
  - Cycling:
    - Men's BMX: (gold) Evgeniy Kleshchenko (RUS) 31.654 (silver) Kirill Yashkin (RUS) 32.587 (bronze) Tautvydas Biknius (LTU) 32.731
    - Women's BMX: (gold) Vilma Rimšaitė (LTU) 37.400 (silver) Marina Beskhmelnova (RUS) 39.275 (bronze) Margarita Lomakova (RUS) 39.797
  - Fencing:
    - Men's épée individual: (gold) Péter Szényi (HUN) (silver) Virgile Marchal (FRA) (bronze) Raffaello Marzani (ITA) & Anatoliy Herey (UKR)
    - Women's foil individual: (gold) Kamilla Gafurzianova (RUS) (silver) Jeon Hee-sook (KOR) (bronze) Katarzyna Kryczało (POL) & Julia Biryukova (RUS)
  - Gymnastics:
    - Men's artistic competition: (gold) Japan (Yodai Hōjō, Hiroki Ishikawa, Ryūzō Sejima, Masayoshi Yamamoto, Shoichi Yamamoto) 269.200 points (silver) China (Chen Xuezhang, Cheng Ran, Liu Rongbing, Wang Guanyin, Yang Shengchao) 265.650 (bronze) Romania (Cristian Bățagă, Marius Berbecar, Ovidiu Buidoso, Vlad Cotuna, Flavius Koczi) 264.650
  - Judo:
    - Women's −63 kg: (gold) Esther Stam (NED) (silver) Miki Tanaka (JPN) (bronze) Chun Gum Hwang (PRK) & Lin Meiling (CHN)
    - Men's −81 kg: (gold) Tomohiro Kawakami (JPN) (silver) Rustam Alimli (AZE) (bronze) Murat Khabachirov (RUS) & Victor Oliveira (BRA)
    - Women's −70 kg: (gold) Kim Polling (NED) (silver) Laura Vargas-Koch (GER) (bronze) Yuko Imai (JPN) & Natalia Bordignon (BRA)
    - Men's −90 kg: (gold) Abdul Omarov (RUS) (silver) Sherali Juraev (UZB) (bronze) Valentin Radu (ROM) & Ryohei Anai (JPN)
  - Swimming:
    - Women's 50m butterfly: (gold) Lu Ying (CHN) 25.98 (silver) Marieke Guehrer (AUS) 26.24 (bronze) Alice Mills (AUS) 26.53
    - Men's 200m butterfly: (gold) László Cseh (HUN) 1:55.87 (silver) Robert Bollier (USA) 1:56.06 (bronze) Hidemasa Sano (JPN) 1:56.81
    - Men's 200m breaststroke: (gold) Glenn Snyders (NZL) & Giedrius Titenis (LTU) 2:10.85 (bronze) Kazuki Otsuka (JPN) 2:10.96
    - Women's 800m freestyle: (gold) Lauren Boyle (NZL) 8:26.30 (silver) Haley Anderson (USA) 8:27.11 (bronze) Melania Costa-Schmid (ESP) 8:33.66
    - Men's 200m backstroke: (gold) Ryosuke Irie (JPN) 1:56.01 (silver) Rexford Tullius (USA) 1:58.66 (bronze) Gareth Kean (NZL) 1:58.74
    - Women's 4 × 100 m freestyle relay: (gold) Australia (Cate Campbell, Mills, Jessica Morrison, Guehrer) 3:40.03 (silver) United States (Kate Dwelley, Felicia Lee, Shannon Vreeland, Megan Romano) 3:40.19 (bronze) China (Zhu Qianwei, Lu, Liu Jing, Tang Yi) 3:40.29
  - Weightlifting:
    - Women's 53 kg: (gold) Jing Ji (CHN) 222 kg (silver) Hsu Shu-ching (TPE) 207 kg (bronze) Pramsiri Bunphithak (THA) 205 kg
    - Men's 62 kg: (gold) Eko Yuli Irawan (INA) 310 kg (silver) Chen Meilong (CHN) 285 kg (bronze) Withawat Kritphet (THA) 283 kg

==== Tennis ====
- ATP World Tour:
  - Rogers Cup in Montreal, Canada:
    - Final: **Novak Djokovic** (SRB) def. Mardy Fish (USA) 6–2, 3–6, 6–4
      - Djokovic wins the tournament for the second time, for his ninth title of the year and 27th of his career. His victory, a fifth Masters 1000 tournament win of the year, sets a record for most Masters 1000 titles won in a season.
- WTA Tour:
  - Rogers Cup in Toronto, Canada:
    - Final: **Serena Williams** (USA) def. Samantha Stosur (AUS) 6–4, 6–2
      - Williams wins the tournament for the second time, for her second title of the year and 39th of her career.

==== Volleyball ====
- FIVB World Grand Prix Second round:
  - Pool E in Zielona Góra, Poland:
    - Poland 3–1 Cuba
    - South Korea 3–0 Argentina
  - Pool F in Almaty, Kazakhstan:
    - Kazakhstan 0–3 Thailand
    - Italy 1–3 Brazil
  - Pool G in Quanzhou, China:
    - Peru 0–3 Germany
    - China 0–3 Russia
  - Pool H in Komaki, Japan:
    - Japan 3–1 Dominican Republic
    - United States 1–3 Serbia
      - Standings (after 6 matches): Russia, Brazil 18 points, United States 14, Italy, Serbia 13, Japan 12, South Korea 11, Poland 10, Thailand 9, China 8, Cuba 6, Argentina, Germany 4, Dominican Republic 3, Kazakhstan 1, Peru 0.

=== August 13, 2011 (Saturday) ===
==== Auto racing ====
- Nationwide Series:
  - Zippo 200 at the Glen in Watkins Glen, New York: (1) (Nevada) Kurt Busch (Dodge; Penske Racing) (2) (California) Jimmie Johnson (Chevrolet; JR Motorsports) (3) (Connecticut) Joey Logano (Toyota; Joe Gibbs Racing)
    - Drivers' championship standings (after 23 of 34 races): (1) (Mississippi) Ricky Stenhouse Jr. (Ford; Roush Fenway Racing) 816 points (2) (Georgia (U.S. state)) Reed Sorenson (Chevrolet; Turner Motorsports) 806 (3) (Virginia) Elliott Sadler (Chevrolet; Kevin Harvick Incorporated) 792

==== Cricket ====
- India in England:
  - 3rd Test in Birmingham, day 4: India 224 & 244 (55.3 overs); England 710/7d. **England win by an innings and 242 runs; lead 4-match series 3–0.**

==== Cycling ====
- UCI World Tour:
  - Eneco Tour, stage 5: (gold) Matteo Bono (ITA) (Lampre–ISD) 4h 12' 14" (silver) Sergey Renev (KAZ) (Astana) s.t. (bronze) Artem Ovechkin (RUS) (Team Katusha) + 3"
    - General classification (after stage 5): (1) Edvald Boasson Hagen (NOR) (Team Sky) 18h 01' 26" (2) Philippe Gilbert (BEL) (Omega Pharma–Lotto) + 12" (3) David Millar (GBR) (Garmin–Cervélo) + 18"

==== Equestrianism ====
- Show jumping – Global Champions Tour:
  - 8th Competition in Valkenswaard, Netherlands (CSI 5*): (gold) Beezie Madden (USA) on Cortes 'C' (silver) Denis Lynch (IRL) on Lantinus (bronze) Jur Vrieling (NED) on Bubalu
    - Standings (after 8 of 10 competitions): (1) Edwina Alexander (AUS) 228 points (2) Luciana Diniz (POR) 192 (3) Ludger Beerbaum (GER) 186.5

==== Football (soccer) ====
- FIFA U-20 World Cup in Colombia:
  - Quarterfinals:
    - **Portugal** 0–0 (5–4 pen.) Argentina in Cartagena
    - **Mexico** 3–1 Colombia in Bogotá
- CAF Confederation Cup group stage, matchday 3:
  - Group A: Club Africain (Tunisia) 2–0 (Angola) Inter Luanda
    - Standings: Club Africain 5 points (3 matches), Inter Luanda 4 (3), (Nigeria) Kaduna United 2 (2), (Ivory Coast) ASEC Mimosas 1 (2).
  - Group B: Maghreb de Fès (Morocco) 1–0 (Nigeria) Sunshine Stars
    - Standings (after 3 matches): Maghreb de Fès 7 points, Sunshine Stars 6, (Democratic Republic of the Congo) Motema Pembe 4, (Algeria) JS Kabylie 0.

==== Golf ====
- Men's majors:
  - PGA Championship in Johns Creek, Georgia, United States:
    - Leaderboard after third round (all USA): (T1) Jason Dufner & Brendan Steele 203 (−7) (3) Keegan Bradley 204 (−6)

==== Multi-sport events ====
- Summer Universiade in Shenzhen, China:
  - Cycling:
    - Men's road race: (gold) Bernhard Oberholzer (SUI) 3h 50' 22" (silver) Patrick Schelling (SUI) s.t. (bronze) Genki Yamamoto (JPN) + 24"
    - Women's road race: (gold) Gu Sun-geun (KOR) 3h 31' 42" (silver) Son Hee-jung (KOR) s.t. (bronze) Anne Arnouts (BEL) s.t.
  - Fencing:
    - Men's sabre individual: (gold) Andriy Yagodka (UKR) (silver) Gu Bon-gil (KOR) (bronze) He Wei (CHN) & Massimiliano Murolo (ITA)
    - Women's épée individual: (gold) Lauren Rembi (FRA) (silver) Olena Kryvytska (UKR) (bronze) Shin A-lam (KOR) & Ayaka Shimookawa (JPN)
  - Gymnastics:
    - Women's artistic competition: (gold) Japan (Yuma Imanishi, Yu Minobe, Keiko Mukumoto, Kyoko Oshima, Mai Yamagishi) 165.200 points (silver) Ukraine (Yana Demyanchuk, Valentyna Holenkova, Maryna Kostiuchenko, Anastasia Koval, Angelina Kysla) 164.600 (bronze) Russia (Yulia Lozhechko, Anna Myzdrikova, Alena Polyan, Irina Sazonova, Ekaterina Skorodumova) 162.150
  - Judo:
    - Women's −78 kg: (gold) Viktoriia Turks (UKR) (silver) Géraldine Mentouopou (FRA) (bronze) Zhang Jie (CHN) & Jeong Gyeong-mi (KOR)
    - Men's −100 kg: (gold) Ryunosuke Haga (JPN) (silver) Clément Delvert (FRA) (bronze) Zafar Makhmadov (RUS) & Kim Kyeong-tae (KOR)
    - Women's +78 kg: (gold) Qin Qian (CHN) (silver) Kim Na-young (KOR) (bronze) Emilie Andeol (FRA) & Belkıs Zehra Kaya (TUR)
    - Men's +100 kg: (gold) Kim Soo-whan (KOR) (silver) Maciej Sarnacki (POL) (bronze) Mathieu Thorel (FRA) & Takeshi Ojitani (JPN)
  - Swimming:
    - Men's 10 km open water: (gold) Simone Ruffini (ITA) 1:58:00.74 (silver) Kirill Abrosimov (RUS) 2:00:03.35 (bronze) Yasunari Hirai (JPN) 2:00:05.54
    - Women's 10 km open water: (gold) Rachele Bruni (ITA) 2:06:49.31 (silver) Nadine Reichert (GER) 2:07:29.21 (bronze) Alice Franco (ITA) 2:08:42.77
  - Weightlifting:
    - Men's 56 kg: (gold) Lizhi Li (CHN) 273 kg (silver) Surahmat Bin Suwoto Wijoyo (INA) 239 kg (bronze) Tan Chi-chung (TPE) 236 kg
    - Women's 48 kg: (gold) Xiao Hongyu (CHN) 188 kg (silver) Ryang Chun-hwa (PRK) 186 kg (bronze) Pensiri Laosirikul (THA) 184 kg

==== Rugby union ====
- Tri Nations Series:
  - Match 4: South Africa 9–14 Australia in Durban
    - Standings: New Zealand 9 points (2 matches), Australia 9 (3), South Africa 1 (3).
- Mid-year Tests, Week 6:
  - Fiji 27–12 Tonga in Lautoka
  - Wales 19–9 England in Cardiff
  - France 19–12 Ireland in Bordeaux
  - Italy 31–24 Japan in Cesena
  - United States 7–27 Canada in Glendale, Colorado

==== Volleyball ====
- FIVB World Grand Prix Second round:
  - Pool E in Zielona Góra, Poland:
    - Poland 0–3 South Korea
    - Cuba 2–3 Argentina
  - Pool F in Almaty, Kazakhstan:
    - Brazil 3–0 Kazakhstan
    - Italy 3–2 Thailand
  - Pool G in Quanzhou, China:
    - Peru 0–3 Russia
    - China 3–2 Germany
  - Pool H in Komaki, Japan:
    - Serbia 3–0 Dominican Republic
    - Japan 0–3 United States
      - Standings (after 5 matches): Russia, Brazil 15 points, United States 14, Italy 13, Serbia 10, Japan 9, China, South Korea 8, Poland 7, Thailand, Cuba 6, Argentina 4, Dominican Republic 3, Germany, Kazakhstan 1, Peru 0.

=== August 12, 2011 (Friday) ===
==== Cricket ====
- India in England:
  - 3rd Test in Birmingham, day 3: India 224 & 35/1 (12 overs); England 710/7d (188.1 overs; Alastair Cook 294, Eoin Morgan 104). India trail by 451 runs with 9 wickets remaining.
    - England achieve their third-highest innings total, and highest since 1938.
- Bangladesh in Zimbabwe:
  - 1st ODI in Harare: Bangladesh 184 (48.4 overs; Brian Vitori 5/30); Zimbabwe 186/6 (41.2 overs). **Zimbabwe win by 4 wickets; lead 5-match series 1–0.**

==== Cycling ====
- UCI World Tour:
  - Eneco Tour, stage 4: (gold) Jesse Sergent (NZL) (Team RadioShack) 17' 55" (silver) Alex Rasmussen (DEN) (HTC–Highroad) + 14" (bronze) Jürgen Roelandts (BEL) (Omega Pharma–Lotto) + 20"
    - General classification (after stage 4): (1) Edvald Boasson Hagen (NOR) (Team Sky) 13h 49' 06" (2) Philippe Gilbert (BEL) (Omega Pharma–Lotto) + 12" (3) David Millar (GBR) (Garmin–Cervélo) + 18"

==== Football (soccer) ====
- CAF Champions League group stage, matchday 3:
  - Group B: Al-Ahly (Egypt) 2–0 (Algeria) MC Alger
    - Standings: (Morocco) Wydad Casablanca 4 points (2 matches), Al-Ahly 4 (3), (Tunisia) Espérance ST 4 (2), MC Alger 1 (3).
- CAF Confederation Cup group stage, matchday 3:
  - Group B: JS Kabylie (Algeria) 0–2 (Democratic Republic of the Congo) Motema Pembe
    - Standings: (Nigeria) Sunshine Stars 6 points (2 matches), (Morocco) Maghreb de Fès 4 (2), Motema Pembe 4 (3), JS Kabylie 0 (3).

==== Golf ====
- Men's majors:
  - PGA Championship in Johns Creek, Georgia, United States:
    - Leaderboard after second round (USA unless stated): (T1) Keegan Bradley & Jason Dufner 135 (−5) (T3) Jim Furyk, D. A. Points, John Senden (AUS) & Scott Verplank 136 (−4)

==== Volleyball ====
- FIVB World Grand Prix Second round:
  - Pool E in Zielona Góra, Poland:
    - Poland 3–0 Argentina
    - Cuba 2–3 South Korea
  - Pool F in Almaty, Kazakhstan:
    - Kazakhstan 2–3 Italy
    - Thailand 0–3 Brazil
  - Pool G in Quanzhou, China:
    - Germany 0–3 Russia
    - China 3–0 Peru
  - Pool H in Komaki, Japan:
    - United States 3–0 Dominican Republic
    - Japan 3–1 Serbia
      - Standings (after 4 matches): Russia, Brazil 12 points, United States, Italy 11, Japan 9, Poland, Serbia 7, China 6, Thailand, South Korea, Cuba 5, Dominican Republic 3, Argentina 2, Kazakhstan 1, Germany, Peru 0.

=== August 11, 2011 (Thursday) ===
==== Cricket ====
- India in England:
  - 3rd Test in Birmingham, day 2: India 224; England 456/3 (115 overs; Alastair Cook 182*). England lead by 232 runs with 7 wickets remaining in the 1st innings.

==== Cycling ====
- UCI World Tour:
  - Eneco Tour, stage 3: (gold) Philippe Gilbert (BEL) (Omega Pharma–Lotto) 4h 54' 53" (silver) Grega Bole (SLO) (Lampre–ISD) + 8" (bronze) Ben Hermans (BEL) (Team RadioShack) + 8"
    - General classification (after stage 3): (1) Gilbert 13h 30' 34" (2) Edvald Boasson Hagen (NOR) (Team Sky) + 5" (3) David Millar (GBR) (Garmin–Cervélo) + 13"

==== Football (soccer) ====
- Copa Sudamericana:
  - First stage, second leg (first leg score in parentheses): The Strongest (Bolivia) 2–1 (0–2) (Paraguay) **Olimpia**. 3–3 on points; Olimpia win 3–2 on aggregate.
  - Second stage, first leg: Vasco da Gama (Brazil) 2–0 (Brazil) Palmeiras

==== Golf ====
- Men's majors:
  - PGA Championship in Johns Creek, Georgia, United States:
    - Leaderboard after first round (all USA): (1) Steve Stricker 63 (−7) (2) Jerry Kelly 65 (−5) (3) Shaun Micheel 66 (−4)
      - Stricker becomes the 23rd player to shoot 63 at a major championship.

=== August 10, 2011 (Wednesday) ===
==== Cricket ====
- India in England:
  - 3rd Test in Birmingham, day 1: India 224 (62.2 overs); England 84/0 (25 overs). England trail by 140 runs with 10 wickets remaining in the 1st innings.
- Australia in Sri Lanka:
  - 1st ODI in Kandy: Sri Lanka 191 (41.1 overs; Mitchell Johnson 6/31); Australia 192/3 (38.1 overs). **Australia win by 7 wickets; lead 5-match series 1–0.**

==== Cycling ====
- UCI World Tour:
  - Eneco Tour, stage 2: (gold) André Greipel (GER) (Omega Pharma–Lotto) 4h 07' 21" (silver) Tyler Farrar (USA) (Garmin–Cervélo) s.t. (bronze) Edvald Boasson Hagen (NOR) (Team Sky) s.t.
    - General classification (after stage 2): (1) Taylor Phinney (USA) (BMC Racing Team) 8h 35' 38" (2) Boasson Hagen + 3" (3) David Millar (GBR) (Garmin–Cervélo) + 8"

==== Football (soccer) ====
- FIFA U-20 World Cup in Colombia:
  - Round of 16:
    - **Nigeria** 1–0 England in Armenia
    - **Spain** 0–0 (7–6 pen.) South Korea in Manizales
    - **Brazil** 3–0 Saudi Arabia in Barranquilla
    - **France** 1–0 Ecuador in Cartagena
- UEFA Euro 2012 qualifying, matchday 8:
  - Group C: Northern Ireland 4–0 Faroe Islands
    - Standings: Italy 16 points (6 matches), Slovenia 11 (7), Northern Ireland 9 (6), Serbia 8 (6), Estonia 7 (7), Faroe Islands 4 (8).
- Friendly internationals (top 10 in FIFA World Rankings):
  - (8) Italy 2–1 (1) Spain
  - (6) England – (2) Netherlands — cancelled due to rioting
  - (3) Germany 3–2 (4) Brazil
  - (7) Portugal 5–0 Luxembourg
  - Republic of Ireland 0–0 (9) Croatia
- Recopa Sudamericana First leg: Independiente (Argentina) 2–1 (Brazil) Internacional
- Copa Sudamericana Second stage, first leg:
  - Atlético Mineiro (Brazil) 1–2 (Brazil) Botafogo
  - Ceará (Brazil) 2–1 (Brazil) São Paulo
  - Flamengo (Brazil) 1–0 (Brazil) Atlético Paranaense

==== Snooker ====
- Players Tour Championship – Event 2 in Gloucester, England:
  - Final: Ding Junhui (CHN) 0–4 **Judd Trump** (ENG)
    - Trump wins his fifth professional title.
    - Order of Merit (after 2 of 12 events): (1) Ronnie O'Sullivan (ENG) 11,500 (2) Trump 10,000 (3) Joe Perry (ENG) 5,200

==== Volleyball ====
- FIVB Men's Junior World Championship in Rio de Janeiro, Brazil:
  - 3rd place match: (bronze) **Serbia** 3–1 United States
  - Final: (silver) Argentina 2–3 (gold) **Russia**
    - Russia win the title for the eighth time.

=== August 9, 2011 (Tuesday) ===
==== Cricket ====
- ICC Intercontinental Cup One-Day:
  - 4th ODI in Toronto: Afghanistan 150 (18.3/20 overs); Canada 133/9 (20 overs). **Afghanistan win by 17 runs.**
    - Standings (after 2 matches): Ireland, Afghanistan, Scotland 4 points, Kenya, United Arab Emirates 2, Netherlands, Canada, Namibia 0.

==== Cycling ====
- UCI World Tour:
  - Eneco Tour, stage 1: (gold) André Greipel (GER) (Omega Pharma–Lotto) 4h 21' 20" (silver) Denis Galimzyanov (RUS) (Team Katusha) s.t. (bronze) Tyler Farrar (USA) (Garmin–Cervélo) s.t.
    - General classification (after stage 1): (1) Taylor Phinney (USA) (BMC Racing Team) 4h 28' 17" (2) Edvald Boasson Hagen (NOR) (Team Sky) + 7" (3) David Millar (GBR) (Garmin–Cervélo) + 8"

==== Football (soccer) ====
- FIFA U-20 World Cup in Colombia:
  - Round of 16:
    - **Portugal** 1–0 Guatemala in Cali
    - **Argentina** 2–1 Egypt in Medellín
    - Cameroon 0–0 (0–3 pen.) **Mexico** in Pereira
    - **Colombia** 3–2 Costa Rica in Bogotá
- Copa Sudamericana First stage first leg: Universidad de Chile 1–0 (Uruguay) Fénix

=== August 8, 2011 (Monday) ===
==== Cricket ====
- Bangladesh in Zimbabwe:
  - Only Test in Harare, day 5: Zimbabwe 370 & 291/5d; Bangladesh 287 & 244 (57.3 overs). **Zimbabwe win by 130 runs.**
- Australia in Sri Lanka:
  - 2nd T20I in Kandy: Sri Lanka 157/9 (20 overs); Australia 149/9 (20 overs; Ajantha Mendis 6/16). **Sri Lanka win by 8 runs; win 2-match series 2–0.**
    - Mendis becomes the first bowler to take six wickets in a T20I innings, and the tenth to do so in any Twenty20 game.

==== Cycling ====
- UCI World Tour:
  - Eneco Tour, Prologue: (gold) Taylor Phinney (USA) (BMC Racing Team) 6' 57" (silver) Edvald Boasson Hagen (NOR) (Team Sky) + 7" (bronze) David Millar (GBR) (Garmin–Cervélo) + 8"

=== August 7, 2011 (Sunday) ===
==== Auto racing ====
- Sprint Cup Series:
  - Good Sam RV Insurance 500 in Long Pond, Pennsylvania: (1) (Michigan) Brad Keselowski (Dodge; Penske Racing) (2) (Nevada) Kyle Busch (Toyota; Joe Gibbs Racing) (3) (Nevada) Kurt Busch (Dodge; Penske Racing)
    - Drivers' championship standings (after 21 of 36 races): (1) (Missouri) Carl Edwards (Ford; Roush Fenway Racing) 720 points (2) (California) Jimmie Johnson (Chevrolet; Hendrick Motorsports) 711 (3) Kyle Busch 709
- IndyCar Series:
  - Honda Indy 200 in Lexington, Ohio: (1) Scott Dixon (NZL) (Chip Ganassi Racing) (2) Dario Franchitti (GBR) (Chip Ganassi Racing) (3) Ryan Hunter-Reay (USA) (Andretti Autosport)
    - Drivers' championship standings (after 12 of 18 races): (1) Franchitti 428 points (2) Will Power (AUS) (Team Penske) 366 (3) Dixon 335

==== Basketball ====
- FIBA Europe Under-16 Championship in Pardubice, Czech Republic:
  - Bronze place game: (bronze) **Spain** 61–53 (OT) France
  - Final: (gold) **Croatia** 67–57 (silver) Czech Republic
    - Croatia win the title for the second consecutive year, and third time overall.

==== Cricket ====
- Bangladesh in Zimbabwe:
  - Only Test in Harare, day 4: Zimbabwe 370 & 291/5d (92 overs; Brendan Taylor 105*); Bangladesh 287 & 112/3 (30 overs). Bangladesh require another 263 runs with 7 wickets remaining.
- ICC Intercontinental Cup One-Day:
  - 3rd ODI in King City, Ontario: Canada 230 (44.5 overs); Afghanistan 213/8 (41.1/43 overs). **Afghanistan win by 2 wickets (D/L).**

==== Equestrianism ====
- Dublin Horse Show in Dublin, Ireland:
  - Show jumping Grand Prix of Ireland (CSIO 5*): (gold) Lauren Hough (USA) on Quick Study (silver) Michel Robert (FRA) on Kellemoi de Pepita (bronze) Pénélope Leprevost (FRA) on Mylord Carthago

==== Football (soccer) ====
- (England) FA Community Shield in London: **Manchester United** 3–2 Manchester City
  - Manchester United win the Shield for the fourth time in five years and 19th time overall.

==== Golf ====
- World Golf Championships:
  - WGC-Bridgestone Invitational in Akron, Ohio, United States:
    - Winner: Adam Scott (AUS) 263 (−17)
      - Scott wins his first WGC title, and his eighth PGA Tour title.
- PGA Tour:
  - Reno-Tahoe Open in Reno, Nevada:
    - Winner: Scott Piercy (USA) 273 (−15)
      - Piercy wins his first PGA Tour title.
- Champions Tour:
  - 3M Championship in Blaine, Minnesota:
    - Winner: Jay Haas (USA) 201 (−15)
      - Haas wins his 15th Champions Tour title.

==== Horse racing ====
- Canadian Thoroughbred Triple Crown:
  - Breeders' Stakes in Toronto: (gold) Pender Harbour (trainer): Mike DePaulo; jockey: Luis Contreras) (silver) Crown's Path (trainer: Gregory de Gannes; jockey: Jesse Campbell) (bronze) Celtic Conviction (trainer: Michael Doyle; jockey: Emile Ramsammy)
    - Contreras becomes the first jockey to win the three Triple Crown events in a year on two different horses, having won the Queen's Plate on Inglorious and the Prince of Wales Stakes on Pender Harbour.

==== Tennis ====
- ATP World Tour:
  - Legg Mason Tennis Classic in Washington, United States:
    - Final: **Radek Štěpánek** (CZE) def. Gaël Monfils (FRA) 6–4, 6–4
      - Štěpánek wins his fifth ATP Tour title, and first since 2009.
- WTA Tour:
  - Mercury Insurance Open in San Diego, United States:
    - Final: **Agnieszka Radwańska** (POL) def. Vera Zvonareva (RUS) 6–3, 6–4
      - Radwańska wins her fifth WTA Tour title, and first since 2008.

==== Triathlon ====
- ITU World Championships, Leg 5 in London, United Kingdom:
  - Men: (gold) Alistair Brownlee (GBR) 1:50:09 (silver) Alexander Bryukhankov (RUS) 1:50:34 (bronze) Jonathan Brownlee (GBR) 1:51:04
    - Standings (after 5 of 6 events): (1) Javier Gómez (ESP) 2660 points (2) Alistair Brownlee 2490 (3) Bryukhankov 2403

==== Volleyball ====
- FIVB World Grand Prix First round:
  - Pool A in Bydgoszcz, Poland:
    - Poland 1–3 Italy
    - Dominican Republic 2–3 Argentina
  - Pool B in Nakhon Pathom, Thailand:
    - Peru 0–3 Cuba
    - Russia 3–0 Thailand
  - Pool C in Busan, South Korea:
    - South Korea 0–3 Brazil
    - Japan 3–0 Germany
  - Pool D in Luohe, China:
    - China 0–3 United States
    - Serbia 3–0 Kazakhstan
      - Standings (after 3 matches): Russia, Brazil, Italy 9 points, United States 8, Serbia 7, Japan 6, Thailand 5, Cuba, Poland 4, Dominican Republic, China, South Korea 3, Argentina 2, Germany, Kazakhstan, Peru 0.

=== August 6, 2011 (Saturday) ===
==== Athletics ====
- IAAF Diamond League:
  - London Grand Prix in London, United Kingdom:
    - Men:
      - 200m: Walter Dix (USA) 20.16
      - Mile: Leonel Manzano (USA) 3:51.24
      - 400m hurdles: Javier Culson (PUR) 48.33
      - 4 × 100 m relay: Stars & Stripes (Trell Kimmons, Mike Rodgers, Michael Tinsley, Joel Brown) 38.23
      - Discus throw: Virgilijus Alekna (LTU) 66.71m
      - High jump: Andrey Silnov (RUS) 2.36m
      - Triple jump: Christian Taylor (USA) 17.68m
    - Women:
      - 100m: Carmelita Jeter (USA) 10.93
      - 400m: Sanya Richards-Ross (USA) 49.66
      - 1500m: Lisa Dobriskey (GBR) 4:04.97
      - 5000m: Lauren Fleshman (USA) 15:00.57
      - 100m hurdles: Sally Pearson (AUS) 12.58
      - 3000m steeplechase: Milcah Chemos Cheywa (KEN) 9:22.80
      - Shot put: Valerie Adams (NZL) 20.07m

==== Auto racing ====
- Nationwide Series:
  - U.S. Cellular 250 in Newton, Iowa: (1) (Mississippi) Ricky Stenhouse Jr. (Ford; Roush Fenway Racing) (2) (Missouri) Carl Edwards (Ford; Roush Fenway Racing) (3) (Virginia) Elliott Sadler (Chevrolet; Kevin Harvick Incorporated)
    - Drivers' championship standings (after 22 of 34 races): (1) Stenhouse Jr. 787 points (2) (Georgia (U.S. state)) Reed Sorenson (Chevrolet; Turner Motorsports) 775 (3) Sadler 758

==== Cricket ====
- Bangladesh in Zimbabwe:
  - Only Test in Harare, day 3: Zimbabwe 370 & 92/4 (34.3 overs); Bangladesh 287 (96.2 overs). Zimbabwe lead by 175 runs with 6 wickets remaining.
- Australia in Sri Lanka:
  - 1st T20I in Kandy: Sri Lanka 198/3 (20 overs; Tillakaratne Dilshan 104*); Australia 163/8 (20 overs). **Sri Lanka win by 35 runs; lead 2-match series 1–0.**

==== Cycling ====
- UCI World Tour:
  - Tour de Pologne, stage 7: (gold) Marcel Kittel (GER) (Skil–Shimano) 2h 50' 00" (silver) Peter Sagan (SVK) (Liquigas–Cannondale) s.t. (bronze) Leigh Howard (AUS) (HTC–Highroad) s.t.
    - Final general classification: (1) Sagan 26h 40' 01" (2) Dan Martin (IRL) (Garmin–Cervélo) + 5" (3) Marco Marcato (ITA) (Vacansoleil–DCM) + 7"
    - UCI World Tour standings (after 19 of 27 races): (1) Cadel Evans (AUS) (BMC Racing Team) 574 points (2) Philippe Gilbert (BEL) (Omega Pharma–Lotto) 482 (3) Alberto Contador (ESP) (Saxo Bank–SunGard) 471

==== Equestrianism ====
- Dublin Horse Show in Dublin, Ireland:
  - Puissance (CSIO 5*): (gold) Rene Tebbel (GER) on Mats' Up du Plessis (silver) six second-placed riders

==== Football (soccer) ====
- FIFA U-20 World Cup in Colombia: (teams in **bold** advance to the Round of 16)
  - Group C:
    - **Ecuador** 3–0 **Costa Rica** in Pereira
    - Australia 1–5 **Spain** in Manizales
      - Final standings: Spain 9 points, Ecuador 4, Costa Rica 3, Australia 1.
  - Group D:
    - **Saudi Arabia** 0–2 **Nigeria** in Pereira
    - Croatia 0–1 **Guatemala** in Armenia
      - Final standings: Nigeria 9 points, Saudi Arabia 6, Guatemala 3, Croatia 0.
- (Italy) Supercoppa Italiana in Beijing, China: **Milan** 2–1 Internazionale
  - Milan win the Supercoppa for a record sixth time.

==== Mixed martial arts ====
- UFC 133 in Philadelphia, Pennsylvania, United States:
  - Light Heavyweight bout: **Rashad Evans** (USA) def. Tito Ortiz (USA) via TKO (strikes)
  - Middleweight bout: **Vitor Belfort** (BRA) def. Yoshihiro Akiyama (JPN) via KO (punches)
  - Welterweight bout: **Brian Ebersole** (USA) def. Dennis Hallman (USA) via TKO (strikes)
  - Middleweight bout: **Costas Philippou** (CYP) def. Jorge Rivera (USA) via split decision (28–29, 29–28, 29–28)
  - Welterweight bout: **Rory MacDonald** (CAN) def. Mike Pyle (USA) via TKO (strikes)

==== Rugby union ====
- Tri Nations Series:
  - Match 3: New Zealand 30–14 Australia in Auckland
    - Standings (after 2 matches): New Zealand 9 points, Australia 5, South Africa 0
- Mid-year Tests, Week 5:
  - Scotland 10–6 Ireland in Edinburgh
  - England 23–19 Wales in London
  - Canada 28–22 United States in Toronto

==== Surfing ====
- Women's World Tour:
  - U.S. Open of Surfing in Huntington Beach, United States: (1) Sally Fitzgibbons (AUS) (2) Lakey Peterson (USA) (3) Carissa Moore (USA) & Coco Ho (USA)
    - Final standings: (1) Moore 55,000 points (2) Fitzgibbons 51,650 (3) Stephanie Gilmore (USA) 40,550
      - Moore wins the title for the first time.

==== Tennis ====
- ATP World Tour:
  - Bet-at-home.com Cup in Kitzbühel, Austria:
    - Final: **Robin Haase** (NED) def. Albert Montañés (ESP) 6–4, 4–6, 6–1
      - Haase wins his first ATP Tour title.

==== Triathlon ====
- ITU World Championships, Leg 5 in London, United Kingdom:
  - Women: (gold) Helen Jenkins (GBR) 2:00:34 (silver) Gwen Jorgensen (USA) 2:00:41 (bronze) Anja Dittmer (GER) 2:00:49
    - Standings (after 5 of 6 events): (1) Bárbara Riveros Díaz (CHI) 2498 points (2) Andrea Hewitt (NZL) 2493 (3) Paula Findlay (CAN) 2490

==== Volleyball ====
- FIVB World Grand Prix First round:
  - Pool A in Bydgoszcz, Poland:
    - Poland 2–3 Dominican Republic
    - Italy 3–1 Argentina
  - Pool B in Nakhon Pathom, Thailand:
    - Peru 0–3 Russia
    - Cuba 2–3 Thailand
  - Pool C in Busan, South Korea:
    - South Korea 0–3 Japan
    - Brazil 3–1 Germany
  - Pool D in Luohe, China:
    - Kazakhstan 0–3 United States
    - China 1–3 Serbia
      - Standings (after 2 matches): Russia, Brazil, Italy 6 points, United States, Thailand 5, Poland, Serbia 4, China, Japan, South Korea 3, Dominican Republic 2, Cuba 1, Germany, Argentina, Kazakhstan, Peru 0.

=== August 5, 2011 (Friday) ===
==== Athletics ====
- IAAF Diamond League:
  - London Grand Prix in London, United Kingdom:
    - Men:
      - 100m: Yohan Blake (JAM) 9.95
      - 400m: Kirani James (GRN) 44.61
      - 800m: David Rudisha (KEN) 1:42.91
      - 3000m: Mo Farah (GBR) 7:40.15
      - 5000m: Craig Mottram (AUS) 13:23.97
      - 110m hurdles: Dayron Robles (CUB) 13.04
      - 3000m steeplechase: Willy Komen (KEN) 8:21.40
      - Long jump: Mitchell Watt (AUS) 8.45m
    - Women:
      - 200m: Bianca Knight (USA) 22.69
      - 800m: Jenny Meadows (GBR) 1:58.60
      - 400m hurdles: Kaliese Spencer (JAM) 52.79
      - 4 × 100 m relay: Stars & Stripes (Knight, Mikele Barber, Kayla Brookins, [Candyce McGrone) 42.92
      - Javelin throw: Christina Obergföll (GER) 66.74m
      - Pole vault: Jenn Suhr (USA) 4.79m
      - Triple jump: Olha Saladukha (UKR) 14.80m

==== Cricket ====
- Bangladesh in Zimbabwe:
  - Only Test in Harare, day 2: Zimbabwe 370 (131 overs; Hamilton Masakadza 104); Bangladesh 107/3 (46 overs). Bangladesh trail by 263 runs with 7 wickets remaining in the 1st innings.
- ICC Intercontinental Cup:
  - In King City, Ontario, day 4: Afghanistan 293 & 69/1 (11.3 overs); Canada 130 & 231 (f/o, 85.5 overs). **Afghanistan win by 9 wickets.**

==== Cycling ====
- UCI World Tour:
  - Tour de Pologne, stage 6: (gold) Dan Martin (IRL) (Garmin–Cervélo) 5h 41' 05" (silver) Wout Poels (NED) (Vacansoleil–DCM) + 1" (bronze) Marco Marcato (ITA) (Vacansoleil–DCM) + 4"
    - General classification (after stage 6): (1) Martin 23h 50' 06" (2) Peter Sagan (SVK) (Liquigas–Cannondale) + 3" (3) Marcato + 3"

==== Equestrianism ====
- Dublin Horse Show in Dublin, Ireland:
  - Show jumping – FEI Nations Cup:
    - Nations Cup of Ireland (CSIO 5*): (gold) Great Britain (Nick Skelton, Michael Whitaker, Scott Brash, Robert Smith) (silver) Ireland (Billy Twomey, Shane Sweetnam, Nicola Fitzgibbon, Denis Lynch) (bronze) Belgium & France
      - Standings (after 7 of 8 events): (1) Netherlands 44 points (2) Germany 40 (3) Great Britain 40

==== Football (soccer) ====
- FIFA U-20 World Cup in Colombia: (teams in **bold** advance to the Round of 16)
  - Group A:
    - **France** 2–0 Mali in Cali
    - **Colombia** 1–0 **South Korea** in Bogotá
      - Final standings: Colombia 9 points, France 6, South Korea 3, Mali 0.
  - Group B:
    - **Portugal** 1–0 New Zealand in Cali
    - Uruguay 0–1 **Cameroon** in Bogotá
      - Final standings: Portugal 7 points, Cameroon 4, New Zealand, Uruguay 2.
- Faroe Islands Cup Final: ÍF Fuglafjørður 0–3 **EB/Streymur**
  - EB/Streymur win the Faroe Islands Cup for the second successive time and fourth time overall.

==== Volleyball ====
- FIVB World Grand Prix First round:
  - Pool A in Bydgoszcz, Poland:
    - Poland 3–0 Argentina
    - Italy 3–1 Dominican Republic
  - Pool B in Nakhon Pathom, Thailand:
    - Russia 3–1 Cuba
    - Thailand 3–0 Peru
  - Pool C in Busan, South Korea:
    - Brazil 3–0 Japan
    - South Korea 3–1 Germany
  - Pool D in Luohe, China:
    - Serbia 2–3 United States
    - China 3–0 Kazakhstan

=== August 4, 2011 (Thursday) ===
==== Cricket ====
- Bangladesh in Zimbabwe:
  - Only Test in Harare, day 1: Zimbabwe 264/2 (90 overs); Bangladesh.
- ICC Intercontinental Cup:
  - In King City, Ontario, day 3: Afghanistan 293; Canada 130 (48 overs; Hamid Hassan 7/61) & 176/7 (f/o, 62 overs). Canada lead by 13 runs with 3 wickets remaining.

==== Cycling ====
- UCI World Tour:
  - Tour de Pologne, stage 5: (gold) Peter Sagan (SVK) (Liquigas–Cannondale) 4h 52' 26" (silver) Michael Matthews (AUS) (Rabobank) s.t. (bronze) Heinrich Haussler (AUS) (Garmin–Cervélo) s.t.
    - General classification (after stage 5): (1) Sagan 18h 08' 51" (2) Marco Marcato (ITA) (Vacansoleil–DCM) + 15" (3) Romain Feillu (FRA) (Vacansoleil–DCM) + 17"

==== Football (soccer) ====
- FIFA U-20 World Cup in Colombia: (teams in **bold** advance to the Round of 16)
  - Group E:
    - **Brazil** 4–0 Panama in Barranquilla
    - **Egypt** 4–0 Austria in Cartagena
      - Final standings: Brazil, Egypt 7 points, Panama, Austria 1.
  - Group F:
    - **Mexico** 0–0 **England** in Cartagena
    - **Argentina** 3–0 North Korea in Medellín
      - Final standings: Argentina 7 points, Mexico 4, England 3, North Korea 1.
- UEFA Europa League Third qualifying round second leg: (first leg scores in parentheses)
  - Mladá Boleslav (Czech Republic) 2–2 (0–3) (Cyprus) **AEK Larnaca**. AEK Larnaca win 5–2 on aggregate.
  - Varaždin (Croatia) 1–2 (2–2) (Romania) **Dinamo București**. Dinamo București win 4–3 on aggregate.
  - Aktobe (Kazakhstan) 1–1 (1–1) (Russia) **Alania Vladikavkaz**. 2–2 on aggregate; Alania Vladikavkaz win 4–2 on penalties.
  - Elfsborg (Sweden) 1–1 (0–4) (Norway) **Aalesund**. Aalesund win 5–1 on aggregate.
  - Qarabağ (Azerbaijan) 1–0 (1–4) (Belgium) **Club Brugge**. Club Brugge win 4–2 on aggregate.
  - Strømsgodset (Norway) 0–2 (1–2) (Spain) **Atlético Madrid**. Atlético Madrid win 4–1 on aggregate.
  - Sligo Rovers (Republic of Ireland) 0–2 (0–0) (Ukraine) **Vorskla Poltava**. Vorskla Poltava win 2–0 on aggregate.
  - Gomel (Belarus) 1–3 (1–2) (Turkey) **Bursaspor**. Bursaspor win 5–2 on aggregate.
  - **Legia Warsaw** (Poland) 0–0 (1–0) (Turkey) Gaziantepspor. Legia Warsaw win 1–0 on aggregate.
  - **Rennes** (France) 2–0 (5–2) (Georgia (country)) Metalurgi Rustavi. Rennes win 7–2 on aggregate.
  - **Spartak Trnava** (Slovakia) 2–1 (1–2) (Bulgaria) Levski Sofia. 3–3 on aggregate; Spartak Trnava win 5–4 on penalties.
  - **Dinamo Tbilisi** (Georgia (country)) 2–0 (4–1) (Iceland) KR Reykjavík. Dinamo Tbilisi win 6–1 on aggregate.
  - Senica (Slovakia) 0–3 (0–1) (Austria) **Red Bull Salzburg**. Red Bull Salzburg win 4–0 on aggregate.
  - **Gaz Metan Mediaș** (Romania) 1–1 (1–1) (Germany) Mainz 05. 2–2 on aggregate; Gaz Metan Mediaș win 4–3 on penalties.
  - **Helsingborg** (Sweden) 3–0 (0–1) (Israel) Bnei Yehuda. Helsingborg win 3–1 on aggregate.
  - Hajduk Split (Croatia) 0–1 (0–1) (England) **Stoke City**. Stoke City win 2–0 on aggregate.
  - Häcken (Sweden) 2–1 (0–3) (Portugal) **Nacional**. Nacional win 4–2 on aggregate.
  - Brøndby (Denmark) 4–2 (0–2) (Austria) **Ried**. 4–4 on aggregate; Ried win on away goals.
  - **Maccabi Tel Aviv** (Israel) 6–0 (2–0) (Bosnia and Herzegovina) Željezničar. Maccabi Tel Aviv win 8–0 on aggregate.
  - **Thun** (Switzerland) 1–1 (2–2) (Italy) Palermo. 3–3 on aggregate; Thun win on away goals.
  - Lokomotiv Sofia (Bulgaria) 0–0 (0–0) (Poland) **Śląsk Wrocław**. 0–0 on aggregate; Śląsk Wrocław win 4–3 on penalties.
  - Westerlo (Belgium) 0–2 (1–3) (Switzerland) **Young Boys**. Young Boys win 5–1 on aggregate.
  - Vaduz (Liechtenstein) 2–1 (0–4) (Israel) **Hapoel Tel Aviv**. Hapoel Tel Aviv win 5–2 on aggregate.
  - ADO Den Haag (Netherlands) 1–0 (0–3) (Cyprus) **Omonia**. Omonia win 3–1 on aggregate.
  - **Olympiacos Volos** (Greece) 3–0 (3–0) (Luxembourg) Differdange 03. Olympiacos Volos win 6–0 on aggregate.
  - **Rabotnički** (North Macedonia) 1–2 (2–0) (Cyprus) Anorthosis. Rabotnički win 3–2 on aggregate.
  - **PAOK** (Greece) 3–0 (2–0) (Norway) Vålerenga. PAOK win 5–0 on aggregate.
  - **Red Star Belgrade** (Serbia) 7–0 (2–1) (Latvia) Ventspils. Red Star Belgrade win 9–1 on aggregate.
  - Jablonec (Czech Republic) 1–1 (0–2) (Netherlands) **AZ**. AZ win 3–1 on aggregate.
  - **Fulham** (England) 2–0 (0–0) (Croatia) Split. Fulham win 2–0 on aggregate.
  - St Patrick's Athletic (Republic of Ireland) 1–3 (0–2) (Ukraine) **Karpaty Lviv**. Karpaty Lviv win 5–1 on aggregate.
  - **Heart of Midlothian** (Scotland) 4–1 (1–1) (Hungary) Paks. Heart of Midlothian win 5–2 on aggregate.
  - Sarajevo (Bosnia and Herzegovina) 0–2 (0–5) (Czech Republic) **Sparta Prague**. Sparta Prague win 7–0 on aggregate.
  - **Austria Wien** 3–2 (1–1) (Slovenia) Olimpija Ljubljana. Austria Wien win 4–3 on aggregate.
  - **Vitória Guimarães** (Portugal) 2–1 (0–0) (Denmark) Midtjylland. Vitória Guimarães win 2–1 on aggregate.
- Copa Sudamericana First stage first leg: Yaracuyanos (Venezuela) 1–1 (Ecuador) LDU Quito
- CONCACAF Champions League preliminary round second leg: (first leg score in parentheses)
  - Alpha United (Guyana) 2–2 (0–8) (Costa Rica) **Herediano**. Herediano win 10–2 on aggregate.
  - Municipal (Guatemala) 2–0 (0–4) (Honduras) **Motagua**. Motagua win 4–2 on aggregate.

=== August 3, 2011 (Wednesday) ===
==== Cricket ====
- ICC Intercontinental Cup:
  - In King City, Ontario, day 2: Afghanistan 293; Canada 21/4 (12 overs). Canada trail by 272 runs with 6 wickets remaining in the 1st innings.

==== Cycling ====
- UCI World Tour:
  - Tour de Pologne, stage 4: (gold) Peter Sagan (SVK) (Liquigas–Cannondale) 4h 21' 15" (silver) Dan Martin (IRL) (Garmin–Cervélo) + 3" (bronze) Marco Marcato (ITA) (Vacansoleil–DCM) + 3"
    - General classification (after stage 4): (1) Sagan 13h 16' 35" (2) Marcato + 5" (3) Romain Feillu (FRA) (Vacansoleil–DCM) + 7"

==== Football (soccer) ====
- FIFA U-20 World Cup in Colombia (teams in **bold** advance to knockout stage):
  - Group C in Manizales:
    - Ecuador 0–2 **Spain**
    - Australia 2–3 Costa Rica
      - Standings (after 2 matches): Spain 6 points, Costa Rica 3, Australia, Ecuador 1.
  - Group D in Armenia:
    - **Saudi Arabia** 6–0 Guatemala
    - Croatia 2–5 **Nigeria**
      - Standings (after 2 matches): Nigeria, Saudi Arabia 6 points, Croatia, Guatemala 0.
- UEFA Champions League Third qualifying round second leg: (first leg scores in parentheses)
  - **Rubin Kazan** (Russia) 2–1 (2–0) (Ukraine) Dynamo Kyiv. Rubin Kazan win 4–1 on aggregate.
  - **Malmö FF** (Sweden) 1–1 (1–0) (Scotland) Rangers. Malmö win 2–1 on aggregate.
  - Vaslui (Romania) 0–0 (0–2) (Netherlands) **Twente**. Twente win 2–0 on aggregate.
  - Slovan Bratislava (Slovakia) 0–2 (0–0) (Cyprus) **APOEL**. APOEL win 2–0 on aggregate.
  - **Viktoria Plzeň** (Czech Republic) 3–2 (1–0) (Norway) Rosenborg. Viktoria Plzeň win 4–2 on aggregate.
  - **Zürich** (Switzerland) 1–0 (1–1) (Belgium) Standard Liège. Zürich win 2–1 on aggregate.
  - **Wisła Kraków** (Poland) 3–1 (2–1) (Bulgaria) Litex Lovech. Wisła Kraków win 5–2 on aggregate.
  - **Sturm Graz** (Austria) 1–0 (1–1) (Georgia (country)) Zestafoni. Sturm Graz win 2–1 on aggregate.
  - Maribor (Slovenia) 1–1 (1–2) (Israel) **Maccabi Haifa**. Maccabi Haifa win 3–2 on aggregate.
  - **Dinamo Zagreb** (Croatia) 1–0 (2–1) (Finland) HJK Helsinki. Dinamo Zagreb win 3–1 on aggregate.
  - Partizan (Serbia) 1–1 (1–2) (Belgium) **Genk**. Genk win 3–2 on aggregate.
  - Trabzonspor (Turkey) 1–1 (0–2) (Portugal) **Benfica**. Benfica win 3–1 on aggregate.
- Copa Sudamericana First stage first leg:
  - San José (Bolivia) 0–0 (Paraguay) Nacional
  - Deportivo Quito (Ecuador) 1–0 (Venezuela) Deportivo Anzoátegui
  - Olimpia (Paraguay) 2–0 (Bolivia) The Strongest
- CONCACAF Champions League preliminary round second leg: (first leg score in parentheses)
  - **FC Dallas** (United States) 1–0 (1–0) (El Salvador) Alianza. Dallas win 2–0 on aggregate.
  - Tempête (Haiti) 0–2 (0–5) (Mexico) **Morelia**. Morelia win 7–0 on aggregate.
  - Puerto Rico Islanders 3–1 (0–2) (El Salvador) **Isidro Metapán**. 3–3 on aggregate; Isidro Metapán win on away goals.
  - **Seattle Sounders FC** (United States) 2–0 (a.e.t.) (0–1) (Panama) San Francisco. Seattle Sounders win 2–1 on aggregate.
  - Olimpia (Honduras) 2–1 (1–3) (Mexico) **Santos Laguna**. Santos Laguna win 4–3 on aggregate.

=== August 2, 2011 (Tuesday) ===
==== Cricket ====
- ICC Intercontinental Cup:
  - In King City, Ontario, day 1: Afghanistan 293 (81.1 overs); Canada 21/4 (12 overs). Canada trail by 272 runs with 6 wickets remaining in the 1st innings.

==== Cycling ====
- UCI World Tour:
  - Tour de Pologne, stage 3: (gold) Marcel Kittel (GER) (Skil–Shimano) 3h 09' 29" (silver) Romain Feillu (FRA) (Vacansoleil–DCM) s.t. (bronze) Jonas Aaen Jørgensen (DEN) (Saxo Bank–SunGard) s.t.
    - General classification (after stage 3): (1) Kittel 8h 55' 00" (2) Adrian Kurek (POL) (Team Poland BGŻ) + 17" (3) Gianluca Maggiore (ITA) (De Rosa–Ceramica Flaminia) + 22"

==== Football (soccer) ====
- FIFA U-20 World Cup in Colombia (team in **bold** advances to knockout stage):
  - Group A in Bogotá:
    - France 3–1 South Korea
    - **Colombia** 2–0 Mali
      - Standings (after 2 matches): Colombia 6 points, South Korea, France 3, Mali 0.
  - Group B in Cali:
    - Uruguay 1–1 New Zealand
    - Portugal 1–0 Cameroon
      - Standings (after 2 matches): Portugal 4 points, New Zealand, Uruguay 2, Cameroon 1.
- UEFA Champions League Third qualifying round second leg: (first leg scores in parentheses)
  - **BATE Borisov** (Belarus) 3–1 (0–0) (Lithuania) Ekranas. BATE Borisov win 3–1 on aggregate.
  - Shamrock Rovers (Republic of Ireland) 0–2 (0–1) (Denmark) **Copenhagen**. Copenhagen win 3–0 on aggregate.
  - Panathinaikos (Greece) 3–4 (1–1) (Denmark) **Odense**. Odense win 5–4 on aggregate.
- Copa Sudamericana First stage first leg:
  - Universidad César Vallejo (Peru) 1–1 (Colombia) Santa Fe
  - Bella Vista (Uruguay) 1–1 (Chile) Universidad Católica
- CONCACAF Champions League preliminary round second leg: (first leg score in parentheses)
  - Real Estelí (Nicaragua) 1–2 (1–2) (Canada) **Toronto FC**. Toronto win 4–2 on aggregate.

=== August 1, 2011 (Monday) ===
==== Cricket ====
- India in England:
  - 2nd Test in Nottingham, day 4: England 221 & 544 (120.2 overs); India 288 & 158 (47.4 overs; Tim Bresnan 5/48). **England win by 319 runs; lead 4-match series 2–0.**

==== Cycling ====
- UCI World Tour:
  - Tour de Pologne, stage 2: (gold) Marcel Kittel (GER) (Skil–Shimano) 3h 38' 35" (silver) Heinrich Haussler (AUS) (Garmin–Cervélo) s.t. (bronze) Graeme Brown (AUS) (Rabobank) s.t.
    - General classification (after stage 2): (1) Kittel 5h 45' 41" (2) Adrian Kurek (POL) (Team Poland BGŻ) + 7" (3) Haussler + 14"

==== Football (soccer) ====
- FIFA U-20 World Cup in Colombia:
  - Group E in Barranquilla:
    - Egypt 1–0 Panama
    - Brazil 3–0 Austria
      - Standings (after 2 matches): Brazil, Egypt 4 points, Panama, Austria 1.
  - Group F in Medellín:
    - Mexico 3–0 North Korea
    - Argentina 0–0 England
      - Standings (after 2 matches): Argentina 4 points, Mexico 3, England 2, North Korea 1.
- UEFA European Under-19 Championship in Romania:
  - Final in Chiajna: (silver) Czech Republic 2–3 (a.e.t.) (gold) **Spain**
    - Spain win the title for the fifth time.
