= EuroBasket 2011 Group E =

Group E of the EuroBasket 2011 took place between 7 and 11 September 2011. The group played all of its games at Siemens Arena in Vilnius, Lithuania.

The group composed of three best ranked teams from groups A and B. The four teams with the best records advanced to the quarterfinals.

== Standings ==
| Team | Pld | W | L | PF | PA | GA | Pts. | Tie |
|---|---|---|---|---|---|---|---|---|
| Spain | 5 | 4 | 1 | 405 | 340 | 1.191 | 9 | 1–0 |
| France | 5 | 4 | 1 | 383 | 388 | 0.987 | 9 | 0–1 |
| Lithuania | 5 | 3 | 2 | 405 | 397 | 1.020 | 8 | |
| Serbia | 5 | 2 | 3 | 388 | 412 | 0.942 | 7 | |
| Germany | 5 | 1 | 4 | 345 | 379 | 0.910 | 6 | 1–0 |
| Turkey | 5 | 1 | 4 | 331 | 341 | 0.991 | 6 | 0–1 |

== 7 September ==
=== Germany vs. Spain ===
7 September 2011
15:30

Report

| Germany | 68–77 | Spain |
Scoring by quarter: 15–16, 18–20, 22–20, 13–21
| Pts: Nowitzki 19; Rebs: Kaman 12; Asts: Schaffartzik 3 | | Pts: M. Gasol 24; Rebs: P. Gasol 7 Asts: Fernández, Navarro 5 |

Siemens Arena, Vilnius
Attendance: 3,500
Referees: Christos Christodoulou (GRE), Fernando Rocha (POR), Marek Cmikiewicz (POL)

=== Turkey vs. France ===
7 September 2011
18:00

Report

| Turkey | 64–68 | France |
Scoring by quarter: 14–12, 13–19, 17–26, 20–11
| Pts: Türkoğlu 13; Rebs: Aşık 11; Asts: Tunçeri 3 | | Pts: Parker 20; Rebs: Parker 6 Asts: Parker 5 |

Siemens Arena, Vilnius
Attendance: 5,500
Referees: Fabio Facchini (ITA), Seffi Shemmesh (ISR), Sergey Mikhaylov (RUS)

=== Serbia vs. Lithuania ===
7 September 2011
21:00

Report

| Serbia | 90–100 | Lithuania |
Scoring by quarter: 24–26, 20–28, 24–24, 22–22
| Pts: Krstić 21; Rebs: four players 4 Asts: Rašić 4 | | Pts: Kalnietis 19; Rebs: Jankūnas 7 Asts: Jasikevičius, Kalnietis 7 |

Siemens Arena, Vilnius
Attendance: 11,000
Referees: Luigi Lamonica (ITA), Damir Javor (SLO), Olegs Latisevs (LAT)

== 9 September ==
=== Spain vs. Serbia ===
9 September 2011
15:30

Report

| Spain | 84–59 | Serbia |
Scoring by quarter: 23–14, 20–18, 27–17, 14–10
| Pts: P. Gasol 26; Rebs: M. Gasol 10; Asts: Navarro 5 | | Pts: Krstić 12; Rebs: Krstić 7 Asts: Teodosić, Marković 6 |

Siemens Arena, Vilnius
Attendance: 4,000
Referees: Fabio Facchini (ITA), Spyridon Gontas (GRE), Apostolos Kalpakas (SWE)

=== Germany vs. Turkey ===
9 September 2011
18:00

Report

| Germany | 73–67 | Turkey |
Scoring by quarter: 6–13, 17–13, 25–20, 25–21
| Pts: Kaman 20; Rebs: Kaman, Nowitzki 7 Asts: Schaffartzik 5 | | Pts: Aşık 19; Rebs: Aşık 11; Asts: Türkoğlu 3 |

Siemens Arena, Vilnius
Attendance: 6,000
Referees: Luigi Lamonica (ITA), Robert Vyklicky (CZE), Aleksandar Milojevik (MKD)

=== Lithuania vs. France ===
9 September 2011
21:00

Report

| Lithuania | 67–73 | France |
Scoring by quarter: 16–18, 12–16, 18–9, 21–30
| Pts: Jasaitis 13; Rebs: Jankūnas 9 Asts: Jasikevičius 6 | | Pts: De Colo 21; Rebs: Noah 13; Asts: Batum 3 |

Siemens Arena, Vilnius
Attendance: 11,000
Referees: Christos Christodoulou (GRE), Fernando Rocha (POR), Petri Mäntylä (FIN)

== 11 September ==
=== Serbia vs. Turkey ===
11 September 2011
15:30

Report

| Serbia | 68–67 | Turkey |
Scoring by quarter: 18–11, 17–16, 21–26, 12–14
| Pts: Teodosić 20; Rebs: Tepić, Teodosić 8 Asts: Teodosić 5 | | Pts: Onan, Kanter 11; Rebs: Aşık 10; Asts: Arslan, Türkoğlu 2 |

Siemens Arena, Vilnius
Attendance: 3,000
Referees: Luigi Lamonica (ITA), Damir Javor (SLO), Petri Mäntylä (FIN)

=== France vs. Spain ===
11 September 2011
18:00

Report

| France | 69–96 | Spain |
Scoring by quarter: 22–21, 16–18, 10–29, 21–28
| Pts: Seraphin 18; Rebs: Diaw 5 Asts: Batum, de Colo 2 | | Pts: Navarro 16; Rebs: Ibaka 7 Asts: Fernández 6 |

Siemens Arena, Vilnius
Attendance: 7,000
Referees: Sreten Radovic (CRO), Olegs Latisevs (LAT), Miroslav Tomov (BUL)

=== Lithuania vs. Germany ===
11 September 2011
21:00

Report

| Lithuania | 84–75 | Germany |
Scoring by quarter: 21–17, 16–16, 21–19, 26–23
| Pts: Kaukėnas 19; Rebs: Jasaitis 9 Asts: Jasikevičius 4 | | Pts: Kaman 25; Rebs: Kaman 11; Asts: Kaman 2 |

Siemens Arena, Vilnius
Attendance: 11,000
Referees: Fabio Facchini (ITA), Spyridon Gontas (GRE), Sergey Mikhaylov (RUS)
