= EuroBasket 2011 Group F =

Group F of the EuroBasket 2011 took place between 8 and 12 September 2011. The group played all of its games at Siemens Arena in Vilnius, Lithuania.

The group composed of the three best ranked teams from groups C and D. The four teams with the best records advanced to the quarterfinals.

== Standings ==
Team	Pld	W	L	PF	PA	GA	Pts.
Russia	5	5	0	355	310	1.145	10
Macedonia	5	4	1	338	313	1.079	9
Greece	5	3	2	348	336	1.036	8
Slovenia	5	2	3	337	337	1.000	7
Finland	5	1	4	338	372	0.909	6
Georgia	5	0	5	329	377	0.873	5

== 8 September ==
=== Georgia vs. Macedonia ===
8 September 2011
15:30

Report

Georgia	63–65	Macedonia
Scoring by quarter: 12–13, 14–16, 18–25, 19–11
Pts: Tskitishvili 20; Rebs: Tskitishvili 10; Asts: Tsintsadze 3		Pts: McCalebb 27; Rebs: Antić 8 Asts: McCalebb 4

Siemens Arena, Vilnius
Attendance: 3,000
Referees: Robert Lottermoser (GER), Ademir Zurapovic (BIH), Marius Ciulin (ROU)

=== Finland vs. Russia ===
8 September 2011
18:00

Report

Finland	60–79	Russia
Scoring by quarter: 14–18, 6–15, 18–26, 22–20
Pts: Huff 14; Rebs: Nikkilä, Kotti 7 Asts: Muurinen 3		Pts: Kirilenko 14; Rebs: Khryapa, Monya 5 Asts: Khryapa 11

Siemens Arena, Vilnius
Attendance: 3,000
Referees: Miguel Perez Perez (ESP), Srdan Dozai (CRO), Tomas Jasevicius (LTU)

=== Slovenia vs. Greece ===
8 September 2011
21:00

Report

Slovenia	60–69	Greece
Scoring by quarter: 13–18, 12–19, 21–7, 14–25
Pts: Lakovič 14; Rebs: Begić 12; Asts: Lakovič 3		Pts: Zisis 19; Rebs: Koufos 8 Asts: Vasileiadis 4

Siemens Arena, Vilnius
Attendance: 6,000
Referees: Juan Arteaga (ESP), Sreten Radovic (CRO), Renaud Geller (BEL)

== 10 September ==
=== Georgia vs. Finland ===
10 September 2011
15:30

Report

Georgia	73–87	Finland
Scoring by quarter: 13–22, 20–14, 19–25, 21–26
Pts: Sanikidze 16; Rebs: Sanikidze 9 Asts: Gamqrelidze 5		Pts: Koivisto 14; Rebs: Muurinen 9 Asts: Rannikko 6

Siemens Arena, Vilnius
Attendance: 3,000
Referees: Juan Arteaga (ESP), Emin Mogulkoc (TUR), Volodymyr Drabikovsky (UKR)

=== Macedonia vs. Slovenia ===
10 September 2011
18:00

Report

Macedonia	68–59	Slovenia
Scoring by quarter: 20–16, 19–15, 15–11, 14–17
Pts: McCalebb 19; Rebs: Antić 6 Asts: Ilievski 5		Pts: Dragić 20; Rebs: Dragić, Begić 7 Asts: Dragić 3

Siemens Arena, Vilnius
Attendance: 5,000
Referees: Miguel Perez Perez (ESP), David Chambon (FRA), Murat Biricik (TUR)

=== Greece vs. Russia ===
10 September 2011
21:00

Report

Greece	67–83	Russia
Scoring by quarter: 16–15, 23–27, 18–23, 10–18
Pts: Koufos 15; Rebs: Fotsis, Papanikolaou 4 Asts: Bourousis 3		Pts: Mozgov 19; Rebs: Khryapa 7 Asts: Khryapa, Kirilenko 5

Siemens Arena, Vilnius
Attendance: 5,000
Referees: Ilija Belosevic (SRB), Robert Lottermoser (GER), Juris Kokainis (LAT)

== 12 September ==
=== Slovenia vs. Finland ===
12 September 2011
15:30

Report

Slovenia	67–60	Finland
Scoring by quarter: 14–12, 28–16, 12–20, 13–12
Pts: Lorbek 14; Rebs: Begić, Slokar 8 Asts: Dragić 4		Pts: Koponen 14; Rebs: Kotti 7 Asts: Koponen 3

Siemens Arena, Vilnius
Attendance: 1,000
Referees: Miguel Perez Perez (ESP), Robert Lottermoser (GER), Marek Cmikiewicz (POL)

=== Greece vs. Georgia ===
12 September 2011
18:00

Report

Greece	73–60	Georgia
Scoring by quarter: 12–13 , 20–22, 19–12, 22–13
Pts: Vasileiadis 15; Rebs: Fotsis 4 Asts: Bramos 3		Pts: Haynes, Shengelia 11; Rebs: Shermadini 14; Asts: Gamqrelidze 3

Siemens Arena, Vilnius
Attendance: 1,200
Referees: Ilija Belosevic (SRB), Ademir Zurapovic (BIH), Marius Ciulin (ROU)

=== Russia vs. Macedonia ===
12 September 2011
21:00

Report

Russia	63–61	Macedonia
Scoring by quarter: 19–20, 18–14, 14–15, 12–12
Pts: Shved 14; Rebs: Vorontsevich 8 Asts: Shved 4		Pts: McCalebb 16; Rebs: Antić 10; Asts: Antić 6

Siemens Arena, Vilnius
Attendance: 3500
Referees: Juan Arteaga (ESP), Srdan Dozai (CRO), Emin Mogulkoc (TUR)
