= EuroBasket 2011 =

International basketball event

2011 m. Europos krepšinio čempionatas (in Lithuanian)

Tournament details
- Host country: Lithuania
- Dates: 31 August – 18 September 2011
- Teams: 24
- Venues: 6 (in 6 host cities)

Final positions
- Champions: Spain (2nd title)
- Runners-up: France
- Third place: Russia
- Fourth place: Macedonia

Tournament statistics
- Games played: 90
- Attendance: 357,134 (3,968 per game)
- MVP: (Spain) Juan Carlos Navarro
- Top scorer: (France) Tony Parker (22.1 ppg)
- Top rebounds: (Germany) Chris Kaman (10.0 rpg)
- Top assists: (Serbia) Miloš Teodosić (5.7 apg)
- PPG (Team): Spain (85.2 ppg)
- RPG (Team): Lithuania (39.0 rpg)
- APG (Team): Spain (19.5 apg)

Official website
- www.fiba.basketball

EuroBasket 2011 was the 37th men's European Basketball Championship, held by FIBA Europe. The competition was hosted by Lithuania. This was the second time EuroBasket had been held in Lithuania, the country having also hosted the 1939 championship. FIBA Europe asserted that Lithuania managed to organize the best European championship in its history. The top two teams are guaranteed spots at the 2012 Summer Olympics.

EuroBasket 2011 was the largest sporting event in the history of the Baltic states, both in terms of the number of national teams (24), games (90), and that of spectators (158,000 tickets sold, with most tickets valid for three separate games.)

Spain won the title for the second consecutive tournament, after defeating France, by a score of 98–85 in the final. Spain's Juan Carlos Navarro was the tournament's MVP.

== Venues and attendances ==
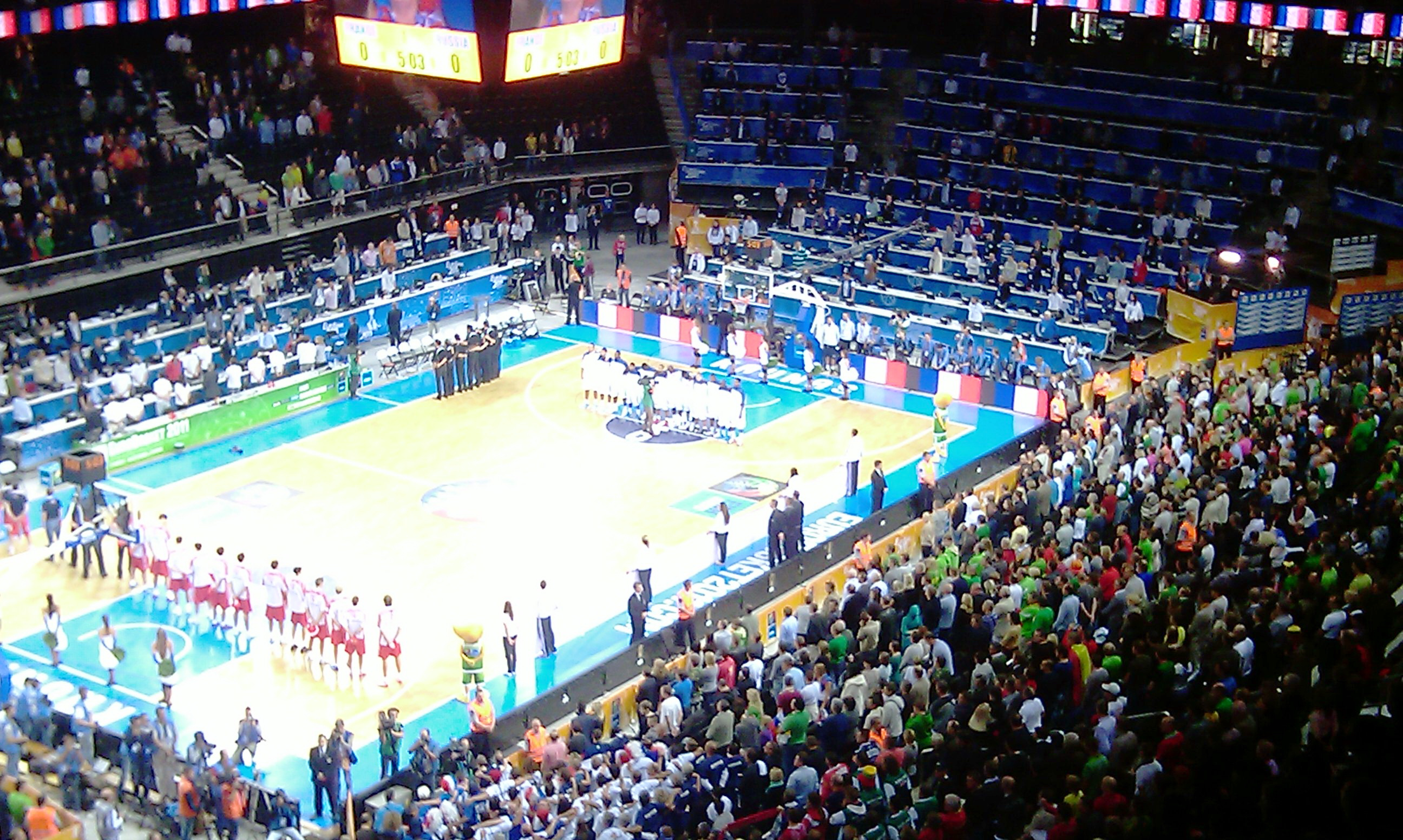
Inside of Žalgiris Arena

The group matches were played in four arenas, namely Alytus Arena, Šiauliai Arena, Cido Arena in Panevėžys and an arena in Klaipėda. The second stage matches were played at the Siemens Arena in the capital Vilnius and the playoffs at the new Žalgiris Arena in Kaunas.

All tickets were sold for matches in which Lithuania played in a matter of several hours after the start of sale. Other tickets were also sold out in advance for all venues except for Alytus (75% of available tickets sold in total). However the Organizing Committee's policy of selling tickets as a 3-game package meant that in some cases the sold-out arenas were not full as some fans would choose to go to only some of the games their ticket entitled them to. This policy was altered in Panevėžys where there were separate tickets for the games Lithuania played.

20,000 foreign visitors went to Lithuania for the championship. 135,000 local fans visited the arenas. 120,000 people (both local and foreign) watched EuroBasket 2011 matches in special fan zones that were constructed beside every arena with a large screen and outdoor seating available.

Among the foreign teams the Georgian, Slovenian, Russian and Latvian national teams had the most fans traveling from their home countries. Georgians had certain city squares decorated in their flags in both Klaipėda and Vilnius.

Several famous people and heads of states went to championship. This included the president of Georgia Mikheil Saakashvili, Foreign Minister of Russia Sergey Lavrov and prince of Spain Felipe.

Location	Picture	City	Arena	Capacity	Status	Round
EuroBasket 2011 is located in Lithuania		Kaunas	Žalgiris Arena	15,442	Opened in 2011	Knockout stage
EuroBasket 2011 is located in Lithuania		Vilnius	Siemens Arena	11,000	Opened in 2004	Group E, Group F
EuroBasket 2011 is located in Lithuania		Šiauliai	Šiauliai Arena	5,700	Opened in 2007	Group B
EuroBasket 2011 is located in Lithuania		Panevėžys	Cido Arena	5,656	Opened in 2008	Group A
EuroBasket 2011 is located in Lithuania		Alytus	Alytus Arena	5,500	Opened in 1981, reopened after reconstruction in 2011	Group C
EuroBasket 2011 is located in Lithuania		Klaipėda	Švyturio Arena	5,486	Opened in 2011	Group D

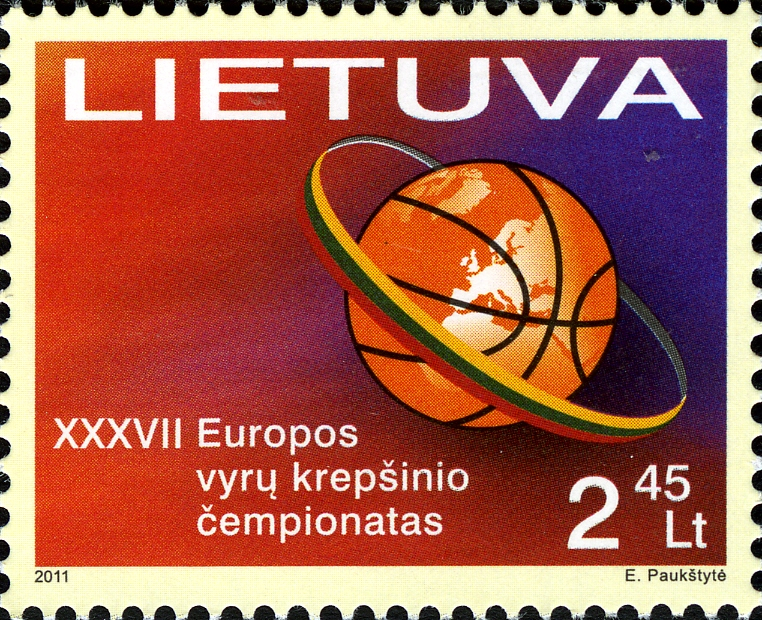
Postage stamp issued to commemorate the EuroBasket 2011

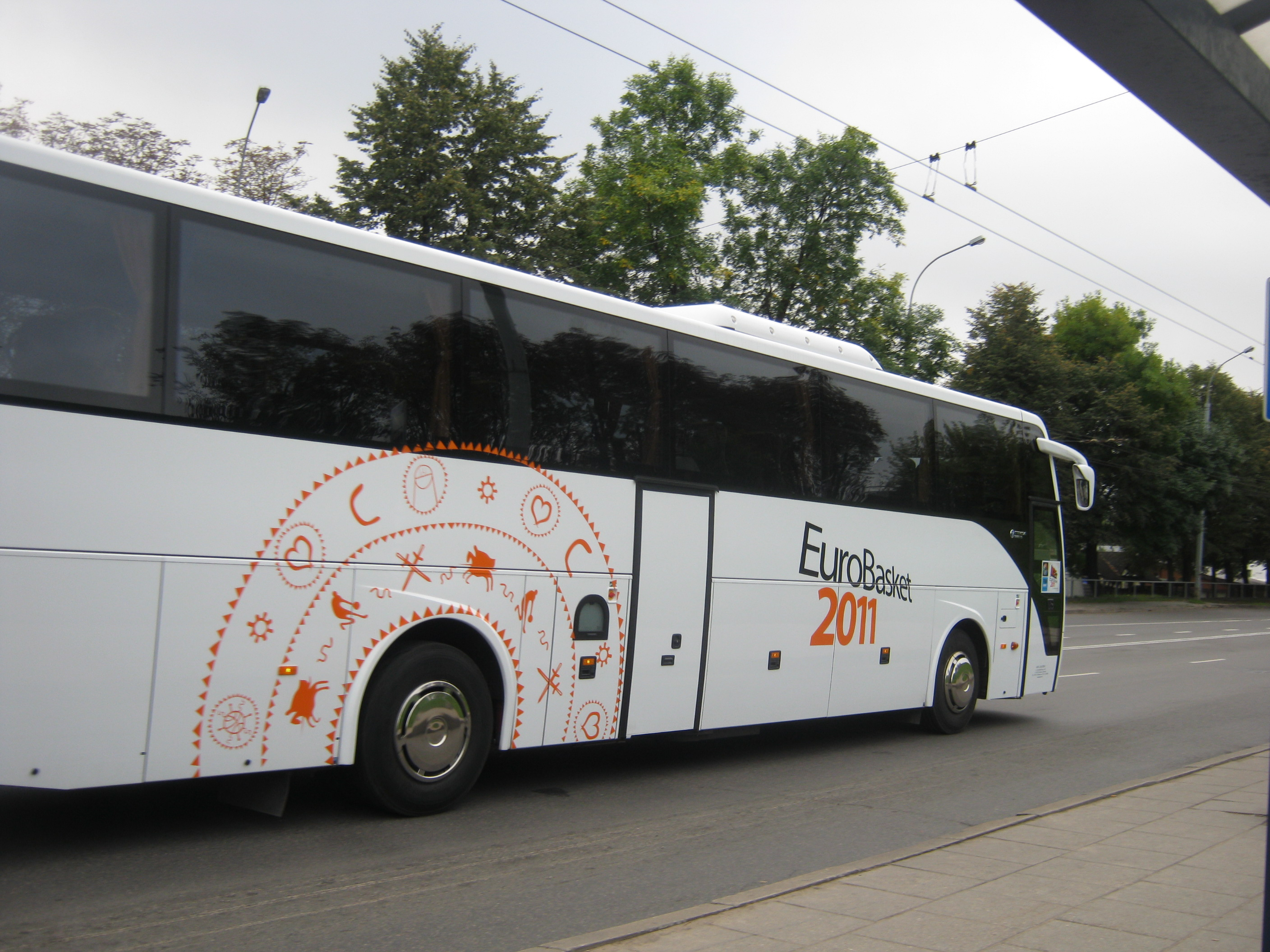
Slovenian national team bus in Vilnius

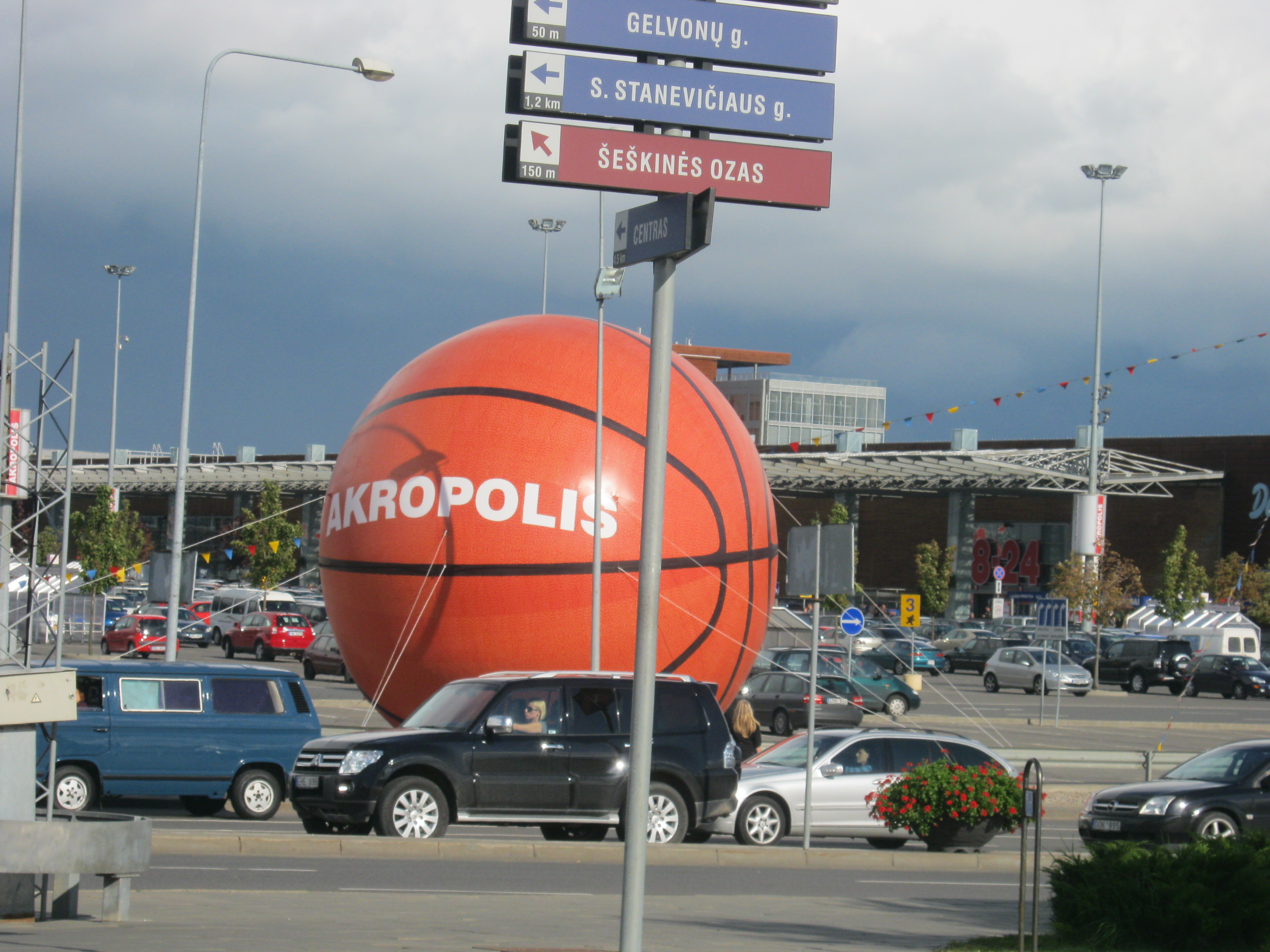
Huge ball for EuroBasket 2011 in Vilnius

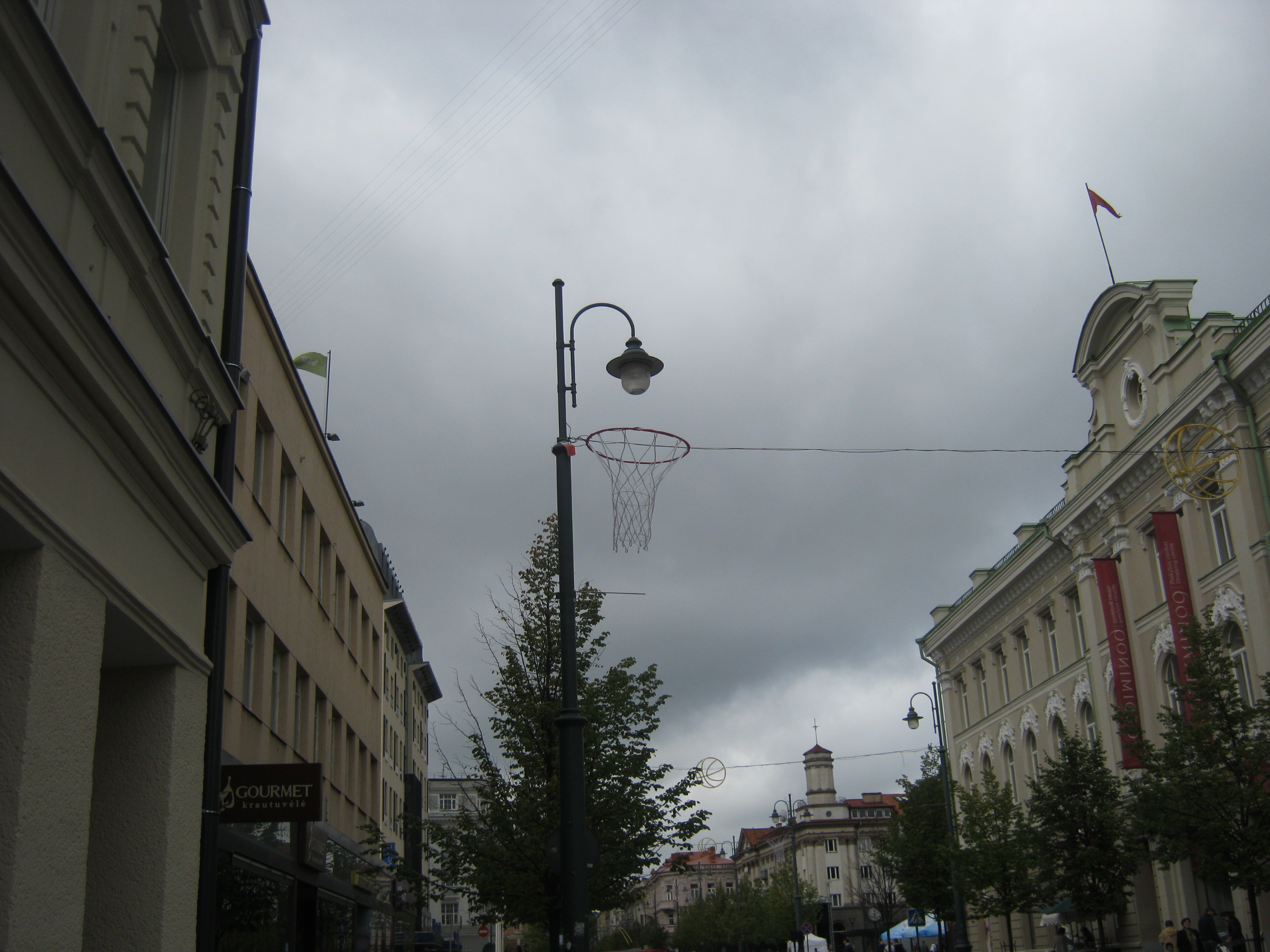
Baskets and balls in Vilnius center

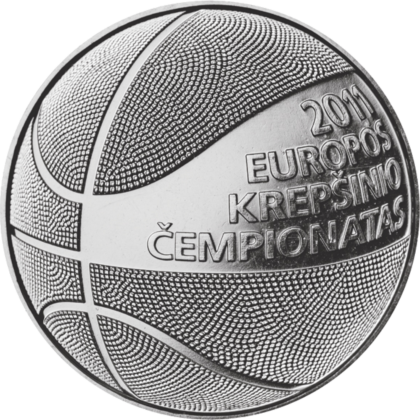
One Litas coin for EuroBasket 2011

== Teams ==
EuroBasket 2011 participants.

It was first decided that 16 teams would participate in EuroBasket 2011, however FIBA Europe decided on 5 September 2010, in a meeting in Istanbul, that there would be 24 teams in the tournament, after the Qualifying Round was concluded.

Lithuania automatically received a place as the hosts, nine other countries that competed in the 2010 FIBA World Championship also received a place, 12 Countries were determined through qualifying matches played in August 2010 (five had initially qualified, and seven were added after the decision to expand the tournament to 24 teams), and two more qualifiers were decided in an additional qualifying tournament that took place in August 2011. All but one of the 15 countries that participated in the Qualifying Round qualified for the final tournament.

== Qualification ==
=== Qualified teams ===
Competition	Date	Vacancies	Qualified
Host nation	–	1	Lithuania
Participant of 2010 FIBA World Championship	28 August – 12 September 2010	9	Croatia; France; Germany; Greece; Russia; Serbia; Slovenia; Spain; Turkey
Qualified through Qualifying Round	2 August 2010 – 29 August 2010	5	Belgium; Great Britain; Israel; Macedonia; Montenegro
Qualified through FIBA Europe decision	5 September 2010	7	Bosnia and Herzegovina; Bulgaria; Georgia; Italy; Latvia; Poland; Ukraine
Qualified through Additional Qualifying Round	9 August 2011 – 24 August 2011	2	Finland; Portugal

== Squads ==
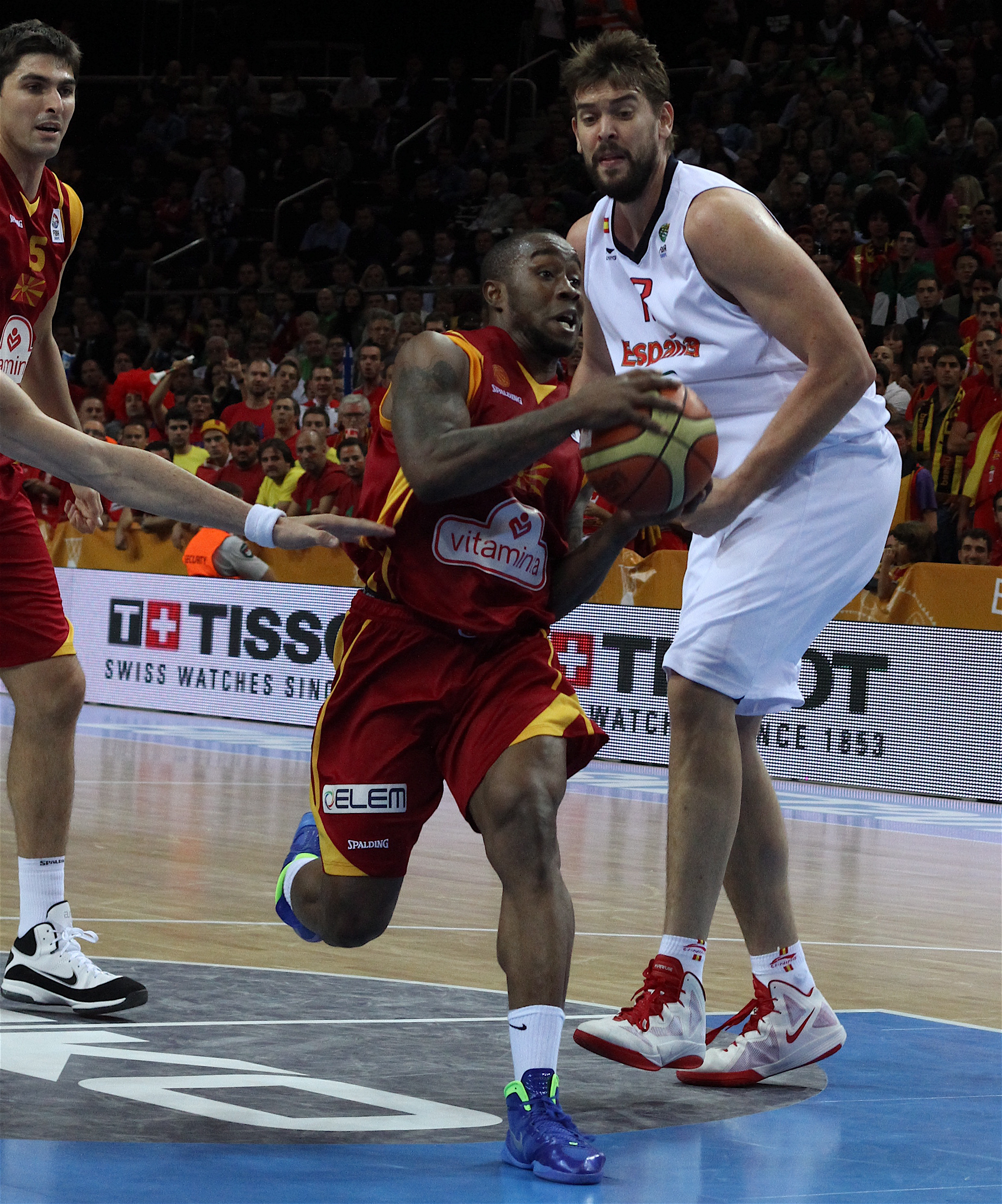
Bo McCalebb led Macedonia squad

Each team consisted of 12 players. Only 1 among the 12 could be a naturalised foreign player, who could not have been in the national team of another nation. Some of the teams had players that traced their ancestry to the teams they represent and were allowed to play for that team, such as Germany (US-born Chris Kaman) and Israel (US-born David Blu, who as Jewish was entitled to Israeli citizenship from birth). Other teams naturalised players participating in their country's league system, among them Spain (Congolese-born Serge Ibaka), Croatia (US-born Dontaye Draper), Bulgaria (US-born E. J. Rowland), Belgium (US-born Marcus Faison), and Poland (US-born Thomas Kelati, who qualified for Polish citizenship through marriage to a Pole). Montenegro and Macedonia each naturalised US-born players who had never played in their league system, but had played in neighbouring Serbia, respectively Omar Cook and Bo McCalebb. Other naturalised players moved to their current countries in their youth, with a notable example being Great Britain's Luol Deng, who fled the Sudanese Civil War with his family as a child.

Lithuania, Serbia, Portugal (Cape Verde was a Portuguese colony) and Finland are notable exceptions, with all of their players having been born in Lithuania, Portugal, Serbia and Finland respectively. Another exception was Latvia playing without foreign players. Turkey had Enes Kanter, who was born to Turkish parents in Switzerland as well as Emir Preldzic, who was born in Zenica, Bosnia and Herzegovina and had already played on the national team of Slovenia in the Olympic Qualifying Tournament in 2008 and Slovenian youth national teams.

Some of the Eastern European national teams, such as Bosnia and Herzegovina, were composed mainly or entirely from players playing abroad. This was primarily true for countries that have good basketball players but no powerful clubs or leagues to match that.

On the other hand, for countries with strong leagues, such as Italy, the National teams were primarily composed of players playing in the local league. The same was true for countries weak in basketball (i.e. with both weak national team and local league) as their players are unable to get into strong foreign leagues. Portugal could be an example here.

Many NBA players represented their national teams, with the Spanish team having 6 NBA stars, the French team having 5, the Turkish team having 4, and so on. It was a strong European basketball competition as a lot of European stars helped their nations.

=== Notable players and coaches ===
- Spain:
  - (Spain) Pau Gasol
  - (Spain) Marc Gasol
  - (Spain) Rudy Fernández
  - (Spain) Ricky Rubio
  - (Spain) Juan Carlos Navarro
  - (Spain) José Calderón
  - (Republic of the Congo) (Spain) Serge Ibaka
  - (Italy) Sergio Scariolo (coach)
- France:
  - (France) Tony Parker
  - (France) Joakim Noah
  - (France) Nicolas Batum
  - (France) Boris Diaw
  - (France) Mickaël Gelabale
  - (France) Nando de Colo
- Russia:
  - (Russia) Andrei Kirilenko
  - (Russia) Victor Khryapa
  - (Russia) Timofey Mozgov
  - (Russia) Andrey Vorontsevich
  - (Russia) Vitaly Fridzon
  - (Russia) Alexey Shved
  - (Russia) Sergei Monia
  - (United States) (Israel) David Blatt (coach)
- Macedonia:
  - (North Macedonia) Bo McCalebb
  - (North Macedonia) Vlado Ilievski
  - (North Macedonia) Pero Antić
- Finland
  - (Finland) Hanno Möttölä
  - (Finland) Petteri Koponen
  - (Finland) Sasu Salin
  - (Finland) Henrik Dettmann (coach)
- Lithuania:
  - (Lithuania) Šarūnas Jasikevičius
  - (Lithuania) Jonas Valančiūnas
  - (Lithuania) Darius Songaila
  - (Lithuania) Rimantas Kaukėnas
  - (Lithuania) Kšyštof Lavrinovič
- Greece:
  - (Greece) Ioannis Bourousis
  - (Greece) Nikos Zisis
  - (Greece) Nick Calathes
  - (Greece) Kostas Papanikolaou
  - (Greece) Kosta Koufos
- Slovenia:
  - (Slovenia) Jaka Lakovič
  - (Slovenia) Goran Dragić
  - (Slovenia) Erazem Lorbek
  - (Slovenia) Mirza Begić
  - (Serbia) Božidar Maljković (coach)
- Serbia:
  - (Serbia) Miloš Teodosić
  - (Serbia) Nemanja Bjelica
  - (Serbia) Nenad Krstić
  - (Serbia) Duško Savanović
  - (Serbia) Dušan Ivković (coach)
- Germany:
  - (Germany) Dirk Nowitzki
  - (Germany) Chris Kaman
- Turkey:
  - (Turkey) Ersan İlyasova
  - (Turkey) Ömer Aşık
  - (Turkey) Enes Kanter
  - (Turkey) Hedo Türkoğlu
- Georgia:
  - (Georgia (country)) Zaza Pachulia
  - (Georgia (country)) Giorgi Shermadini
  - (Georgia (country)) Tornike Shengelia
- Croatia:
  - (Croatia) Ante Tomić
  - (Croatia) Marko Popović
  - (Croatia) Bojan Bogdanović
  - (United States) (Croatia) Dontaye Draper
- Great Britain:
  - (United Kingdom) Luol Deng
  - (United Kingdom) Joel Freeland
- Israeli:
  - (Israel) Omri Casspi
- Poland:
  - (United States) (Poland) Thomas Kelati
  - (Kosovo) (Poland) Dardan Berisha
- Bosnia and Herzegovina
  - (Bosnia and Herzegovina) Mirza Teletović
- Italy:
  - (Italy) Andrea Bargnani
  - (Italy) Marco Belinelli
  - (Italy) Danilo Gallinari
  - (Italy) Simone Pianigiani (coach)
- Montenegro:
  - (United States) (Montenegro) Omar Cook
  - (Montenegro) Nikola Peković
  - (Montenegro) Nikola Vučević
- Latvia:
  - (Latvia) Dāvis Bertāns
  - (Latvia) Dairis Bertāns
- Belgium:
  - (Belgium) Tomas Van Den Spiegel
  - (Democratic Republic of the Congo) (Belgium) D. J. Mbenga
- Portugal:
  - (Portugal) Mário Palma (coach)

== Group draw and championship system ==
The draw ceremony held on 30 January 2011 in the Lithuanian National Drama Theatre, Vilnius, divided the qualified teams into four groups of six, groups A, B, C, and D. The hosts of the evening were Jurgita Jurkutė and Vytautas Rumšas. The balls were drawn by retired basketball players European champions and Olympic medalists Stasys Stonkus, Modestas Paulauskas, Dino Meneghin, Sergejus Jovaiša, Alexander Anatolyevich Volkov and Arvydas Sabonis. A special concert followed the draw where a song was dedicated for each of the participating nations.

It was decided that Group A games would take place in Panevėžys, Group B in Šiauliai, Group C in Alytus and Group D in Klaipėda.

Line 1	Line 2	Line 3	Line 4	Line 5	Line 6
Spain; Serbia; Greece; Slovenia	France; Croatia; Russia; Turkey	Lithuania; Germany; Montenegro; Belgium	Great Britain; Macedonia; Israel; Georgia	Italy; Bulgaria; Poland; Bosnia and Herzegovina	Ukraine; Latvia; Portugal; Finland

In the first stage every team had to play against every other team of their group (round robin). This meant five matches per team.

From every group the 3 best teams advanced to the second stage and the 3 worst teams were eliminated. In the second stage 2 new groups were formed. The 3 best teams from groups A and B were united to form group E whereas the 3 best teams from groups C and D were united to form group F.

In these two new groups of the second stage only matches by teams that had not yet played each other had to be played. As for the matches that had already happened in the first stage their results would also count in the second stage. Therefore, every team played 3 matches and there were 12 teams in the second stage.

Out of the second stage the 4 best teams from each of the two groups advanced to the quarterfinals (8 teams in total) whereas the 2 worst teams were eliminated from championship (4 teams in total).

== Logo, official song and mascot of the championship ==
Official mascot

"Celebrate Basketball" (2011)
Official EuroBasket 2011 song

A public contest was introduced to create the logo for the competition. 49 designs were presented initially to the organizers and the best three were sent to FIBA Europe, which selected the winning design. The author of it was designer Kęstutis Koira. The EuroBasket 2011 logo was unveiled on 24 January 2009 in Cido Arena, Panevėžys, during the final game of the Lithuanian Basketball Federation Cup. It displays the Columns of Gediminas overlaid on a backboard.

Lithuania is the first host country of EuroBasket to have an official EuroBasket song. The song "Celebrate basketball", written by Marijonas Mikutavičius and performed by Mia, Mantas Jankavičius and Marijonas Mikutavičius, was chosen by a televoting in Lithuania. There are two versions of the song – in Lithuanian and English. Later, another version was added – "Nebetyli sirgaliai" (lit. The Fans are no Longer Quiet).

The mascot of the championship was Amberis. Its head was in the form and color of a piece of amber. The name "Amberis" is a portmanteau of the English word amber and the Lithuanian nominative case masculine gender ending "is". The real word for amber in Lithuanian is Gintaras. There was an Amberis in every arena and quite frequently there were more than a single Amberis at a time interacting with each other as well as spectators. On the screens in the arenas a "legend" was shown where a piece of amber was given by a coach to a young basketball player to bring him luck and this piece turned into Amberis.

== Special events ==
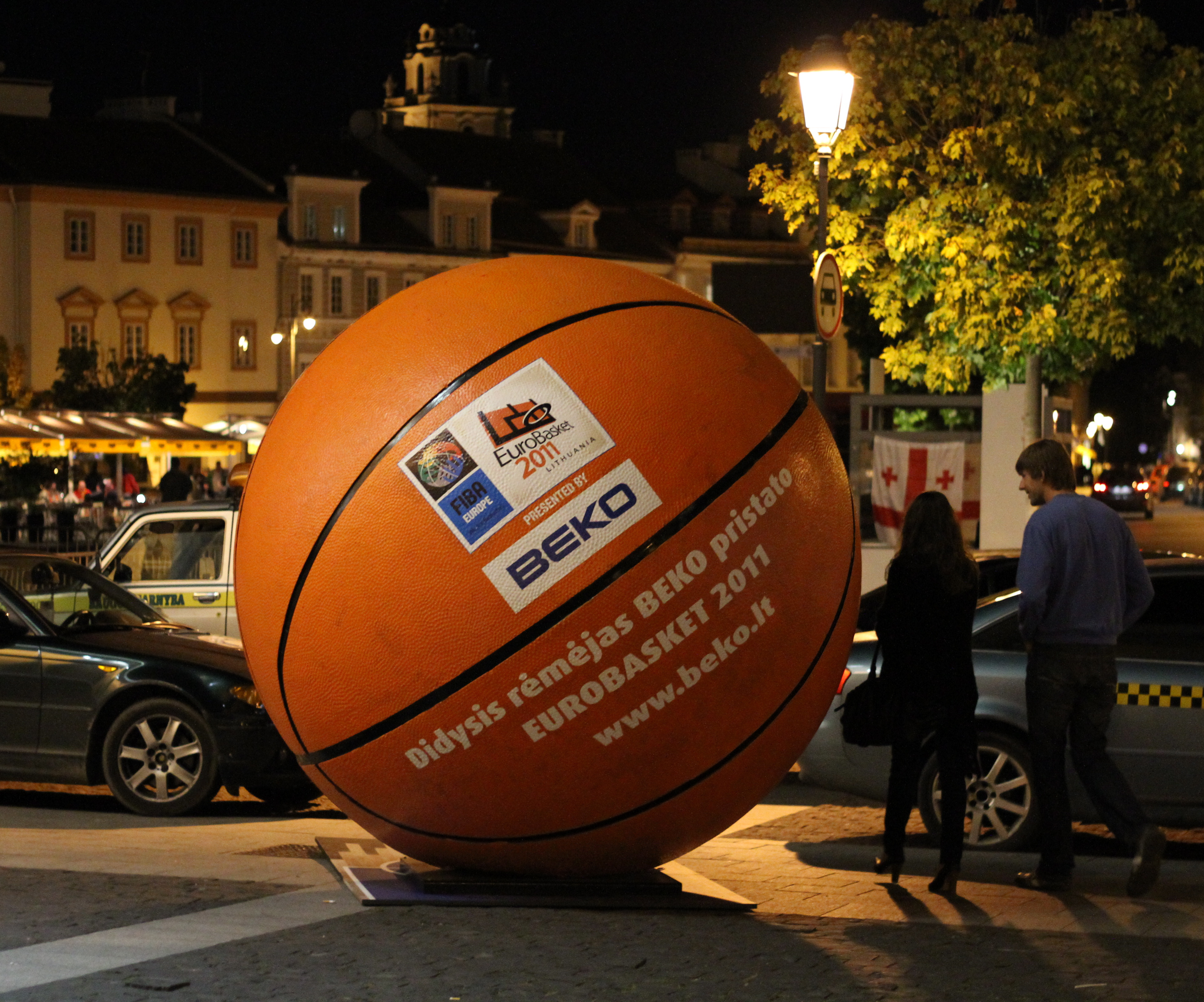
Huge ball in Vilnius center.

Basketball enjoys extraordinary popularity in Lithuania. As such, many events were organized to mark the championship, including:

- In summer 2011 a dribble marathon around the whole of Lithuania was organized. Groups of people would dribble from one town to the next one, where they would give the balls to another set of people who would then dribble to the next town and so on. Every town of Lithuania was visited with TV documenting the events every day. Among the people who took part in the event were the president of Lithuania, several ministers, mayors, sportsmen, opera and ballet stars and so on. In the end the 13 balls were given to the Lithuanian National Basketball team on 29 August 2011.
- On 29 August 2011, Lithuania set a new record for simultaneous dribbling, previously held by Poland. 60,000 Lithuanians from Vilnius, Kaunas, Panevėžys, Klaipėda, Šiauliai and Alytus dribbled Molten balls simultaneously, beating Poland's record of 30,000 people.
- The Vilnius TV Tower observation deck was turned into a large basketball basket. It was made of lights that shone in the dark. The "basket" was 160 meters tall, higher than any other building in Lithuania.
- Composer Vidmantas Bartulis and poet Gintaras Patackas wrote an oratorio for basketball called "That Space-like Feeling of Basketball" ("Tas kosminis krepšinio jausmas"). This oratorio, praising basketball and Kauno Žalgiris team, was performed during the opening of Kaunas Arena on 16 August 2011.

Additionally, from Spring 2011, many of the TV and newspaper advertisements became basketball-oriented. Each of the cities where EuroBasket 2011 would take place received many minor details marking the championship: for example, the trash bins in Panevėžys were repainted to look like basketballs, an abandoned building in Vilnius had its windows covered by flags of the participant nations while balls were drawn on the pavement in some places.

Many ordinary Lithuanians decorated their cars with small Lithuanian flags flying above side windows (like during every other basketball championship). Flags covering the opposite side of the car mirrors are also popular. Some foreign fans who visited Lithuania during the championship adopted this practice as well.

A major Lithuanian news company adopted the practice of predicting each Lithuania national basketball team match in the EuroBasket. Lazdeika the Crab served as the oracle. The crab selected one of the two coconut shells to hide in when light was shone on it. Each of the two coconut shells has a country's flag – Lithuania's flag and opponent flag. At the beginning the crab's guesses would prove to be correct yet in the end they went wrong. Some people believe that the predictions were fixed - that is, the crab would be filmed many times and only when its "prediction" would match that of bookmakers would the "prediction" be aired on TV.

== FIBA broadcasting rights ==
At least some matches were broadcast in 150 countries and territories all over the world.

Country	Broadcaster
Albania	SuperSport Albania
Argentina	DirecTV
Belgium	Be TV
Belgium	TELENET
Bosnia and Herzegovina	BHRT
Brazil	SporTV
Brazil	ESPN Brasil
Brazil	Band Sports
Brazil	TV Esporte Interativo
Bulgaria	BNT
Croatia	HRT
Czech Republic	Czech Television
Czech Republic	Sport 1
Cyprus	Lumiere TV
Denmark	Viasat Sport
Great Britain	ESPN
Great Britain	BBC Red Button
Estonia	Viasat Sport
Finland	Viasat Sport
Finland	Nelonen Pro
France	Sport+
Macedonia	Sitel
Macedonia	Sitel 3
Georgia	1TV
Germany	Sport1
Greece	ERT
Hungary	Sport 1
Israel	IBA
Israel	Charlton

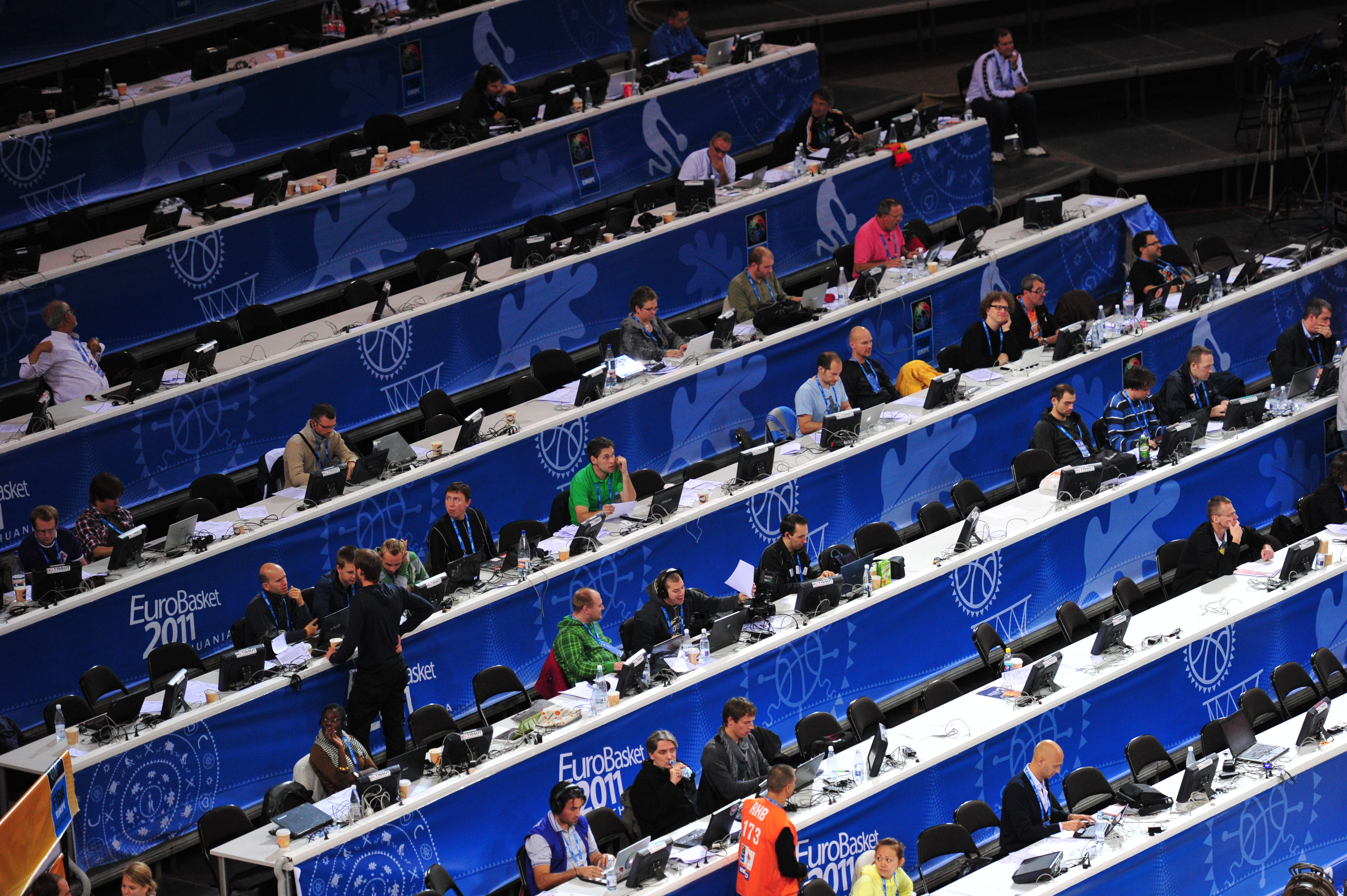
TV commentators for EuroBasket 2011

Country	Broadcaster
Italy	RAI
Latvia	TV6
Lithuania	TV3
Lithuania	Viasat Sport
Japan	J Sports
Montenegro	RTCG
Norway	Viasat Sport
Philippines	Basketball TV/AKTV
Poland	TVP
Portugal	Sport TV
Qatar	Al Jazeera Sports
Russia	NTV Plus
Russia	Russia 2
Romania	Sport 1
Serbia	RTS 1
Slovakia	Sport 1
Slovenia	RTVSLO
Slovenia	Šport TV
South Africa	SuperSport
Spain	La Sexta
Spain	Marca TV
Sweden	TV10
Taiwan	Videoland
Turkey	NTV Spor
Ukraine	2+2
USA	ESPN3

== Financial details ==
According to the Lithuanian Basketball Association the championship expenses were 32 million Litas and the income was 34.8 million Litas, which means the profit of the event was 2.8 million Litas.

Out of the 32 million Litas expenses some 9.8 million were funded by the Lithuanian state institutions whereas the remaining 22.2 million were amassed from sponsors or other sources. It is assumed that the state earned 11.9 million Litas due to VAT taxes paid by 20 000 foreign visitors therefore earning a 2.1 million Litas profit.

Out of the 34.8 million litas income 24.7 million Litas were amassed by selling tickets (TV rights and certain other rights are owned by FIBA rather than the local basketball association and therefore are not included in the revenues).

During the championship there were 3,984 people responsible for safety and 1,500 volunteers responsible for various duties such as helping spectators or giving the balls for play. The 1,500 volunteers were chosen out of 6,000 persons who wanted to volunteer.

1,300 journalists worked in the championships, out of them 200 were TV and radio commentators. 1,300 media accreditation licenses were issued.

== Preliminary round ==
Teams played each other once. The top three placed teams move on to the next round. In the event of a tie on points, direct matches between (points and goal average, i.e. points for/points against) were taken into account, if still tied, goal average in all matches was used as tiebreaker and not points difference.

All times are local (UTC+3)

=== Group A ===
Venue: Cido Arena, Panevėžys

Team	Pld	W	L	PF	PA	GA	Pts.	Tie
Spain	5	4	1	404	364	1.109	9	1–0
Lithuania	5	4	1	429	374	1.147	9	0–1
Turkey	5	3	2	385	333	1.156	8	
Great Britain	5	2	3	372	410	0.907	7	1–0
Poland	5	2	3	401	424	0.945	7	0–1
Portugal	5	0	5	344	430	0.800	5	

31 August 2011
Spain	83–78	Poland
Turkey	79–56	Portugal
Lithuania	80–69	Great Britain
1 September 2011
Portugal	73–87	Spain
Great Britain	61–90	Turkey
Poland	77–97	Lithuania
2 September 2011
Spain	86–69	Great Britain
Portugal	73–81	Poland
Turkey	68–75	Lithuania
4 September 2011
Great Britain	85–73	Portugal
Poland	84–83	Turkey
Lithuania	79–91	Spain
5 September 2011
Great Britain	88–81	Poland
Spain	57–65	Turkey
Portugal	69–98	Lithuania

=== Group B ===
Venue: Šiauliai Arena, Šiauliai

Team	Pld	W	L	PF	PA	GA	Pts.
France	5	5	0	438	391	1.120	10
Serbia	5	4	1	432	386	1.119	9
Germany	5	3	2	377	357	1.056	8
Israel	5	2	3	399	448	0.891	7
Italy	5	1	4	380	405	0.938	6
Latvia	5	0	5	385	424	0.908	5

31 August 2011
Serbia	80–68	Italy
France	89–78	Latvia
Germany	91–64	Israel
1 September 2011
Latvia	77–92	Serbia
Israel	68–85	France
Italy	62–76	Germany
2 September 2011
Serbia	89–80	Israel
Latvia	62–71	Italy
France	76–65	Germany
4 September 2011
Israel	91–88	Latvia
Italy	84–91	France
Germany	64–75	Serbia
5 September 2011
Israel	96–95 (OT)	Italy
Latvia	80–81	Germany
Serbia	96–97 (OT)	France

=== Group C ===
Venue: Alytus Arena, Alytus

Team	Pld	W	L	PF	PA	GA	Pts.	Tie
Macedonia	5	4	1	362	337	1.074	9	1–0
Greece	5	4	1	360	324	1.129	9	0–1
Finland	5	2	3	373	366	1.019	7	1–1, 1.155
Croatia	5	2	3	396	404	0.980	7	1–1, 0.959
Bosnia and Herzegovina	5	2	3	380	409	0.929	7	1–1, 0.907
Montenegro	5	1	4	357	388	0.921	6	

31 August 2011
Montenegro	70–65 (OT)	Macedonia
Greece	76–67	Bosnia and Herzegovina
Croatia	84–79	Finland
1 September 2011
Bosnia and Herzegovina	94–86	Montenegro
Finland	61–81	Greece
Macedonia	78–76	Croatia
3 September 2011
Finland	92–64	Bosnia and Herzegovina
Greece	58–72	Macedonia
Croatia	97–81	Montenegro
4 September 2011
Macedonia	72–70	Finland
Montenegro	55–71	Greece
Bosnia and Herzegovina	92–80	Croatia
5 September 2011
Finland	71–65	Montenegro
Greece	74–69	Croatia
Macedonia	75–63	Bosnia and Herzegovina

=== Group D ===
Venue: Klaipėda Arena, Klaipėda

Team	Pld	W	L	PF	PA	GA	Pts.	Tie
Russia	5	5	0	371	321	1.155	10	
Slovenia	5	4	1	356	324	1.098	9	
Georgia	5	2	3	352	343	1.026	7	1–1, 1.045
Bulgaria	5	2	3	339	357	0.949	7	1–1, 0.993
Ukraine	5	2	3	322	327	0.984	7	1–1, 0.960
Belgium	5	0	5	304	372	0.817	5	

31 August 2011
Belgium	59–81	Georgia
Slovenia	67–59	Bulgaria
Russia	73–64	Ukraine
1 September 2011
Bulgaria	68–65	Belgium
Georgia	58–65	Russia
Ukraine	64–68	Slovenia
3 September 2011
Ukraine	67–56	Bulgaria
Slovenia	87–75	Georgia
Russia	79–58	Belgium
4 September 2011
Georgia	69–53	Ukraine
Bulgaria	77–89	Russia
Belgium	61–70	Slovenia
5 September 2011
Georgia	69–79	Bulgaria
Slovenia	64–65	Russia
Ukraine	74–61	Belgium

== Second round ==
=== Group E ===
The group composed of the three best ranked teams from Groups A and B. Teams coming from the same initial group didn't play again vs. each other, but "carried" the results of the matches played between them for the first round.

Four teams with the best records advanced to the quarter-finals.

Team	Pld	W	L	PF	PA	GA	Pts.	Tie
Spain	5	4	1	405	340	1.191	9	1–0
France	5	4	1	383	388	0.987	9	0–1
Lithuania	5	3	2	405	397	1.020	8	
Serbia	5	2	3	388	412	0.942	7	
Germany	5	1	4	345	379	0.910	6	1–0
Turkey	5	1	4	331	341	0.991	6	0–1

7 September 2011
Germany	68–77	Spain	Siemens Arena, Vilnius
Turkey	64–68	France	Siemens Arena, Vilnius
Serbia	90–100	Lithuania	Siemens Arena, Vilnius
9 September 2011
Spain	84–59	Serbia	Siemens Arena, Vilnius
Germany	73–67	Turkey	Siemens Arena, Vilnius
Lithuania	67–73	France	Siemens Arena, Vilnius
11 September 2011
Serbia	68–67	Turkey	Siemens Arena, Vilnius
France	69–96	Spain	Siemens Arena, Vilnius
Lithuania	84–75	Germany	Siemens Arena, Vilnius

=== Group F ===
The group composed of the three best ranked teams from groups C and D. Teams coming from the same initial group didn't play again vs. each other, but "carried" the results of the matches played between them for the first round.

The four teams with the best records advanced to the quarter-finals.

Team	Pld	W	L	PF	PA	GA	Pts.
Russia	5	5	0	355	310	1.145	10
Macedonia	5	4	1	338	313	1.079	9
Greece	5	3	2	348	336	1.036	8
Slovenia	5	2	3	337	337	1.000	7
Finland	5	1	4	338	372	0.909	6
Georgia	5	0	5	329	377	0.873	5

8 September 2011
Georgia	63–65	Macedonia	Siemens Arena, Vilnius
Finland	60–79	Russia	Siemens Arena, Vilnius
Slovenia	60–69	Greece	Siemens Arena, Vilnius
10 September 2011
Georgia	73–87	Finland	Siemens Arena, Vilnius
Macedonia	68–59	Slovenia	Siemens Arena, Vilnius
Greece	67–83	Russia	Siemens Arena, Vilnius
12 September 2011
Slovenia	67–60	Finland	Siemens Arena, Vilnius
Greece	73–60	Georgia	Siemens Arena, Vilnius
Russia	63–61	Macedonia	Siemens Arena, Vilnius

== Knockout stage ==
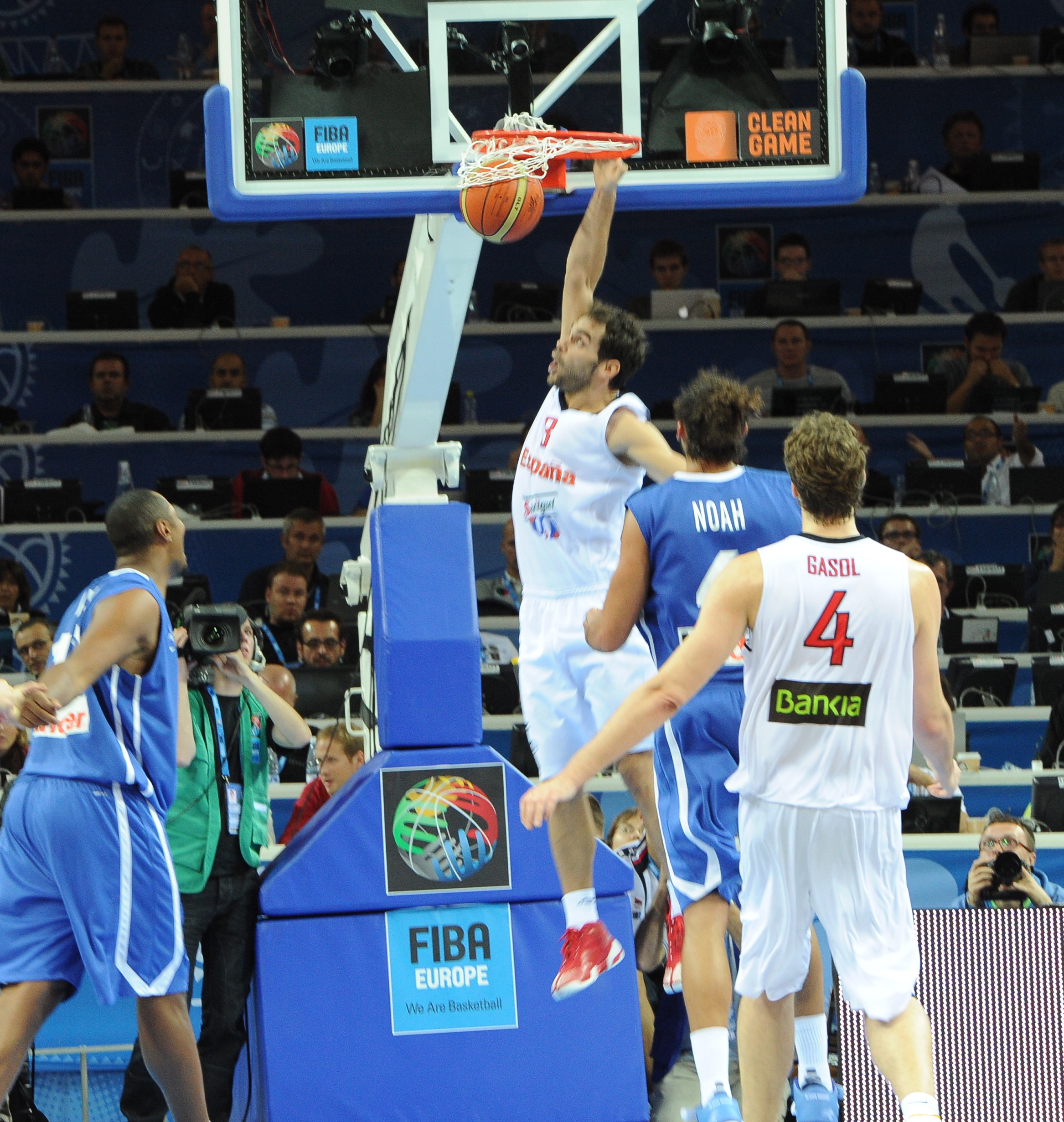
Finals: Spain vs. France

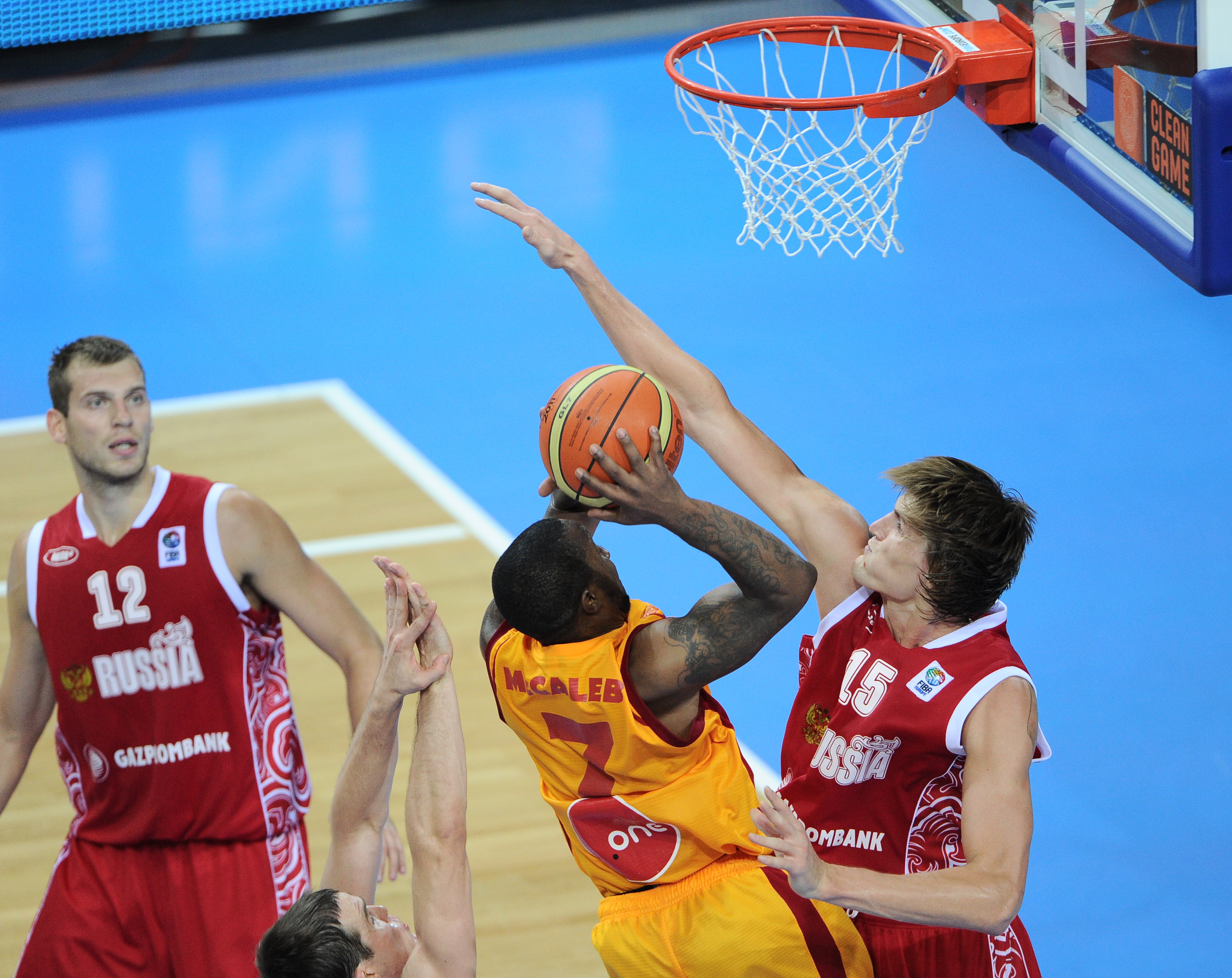
Bronze game: Macedonia vs. Russia

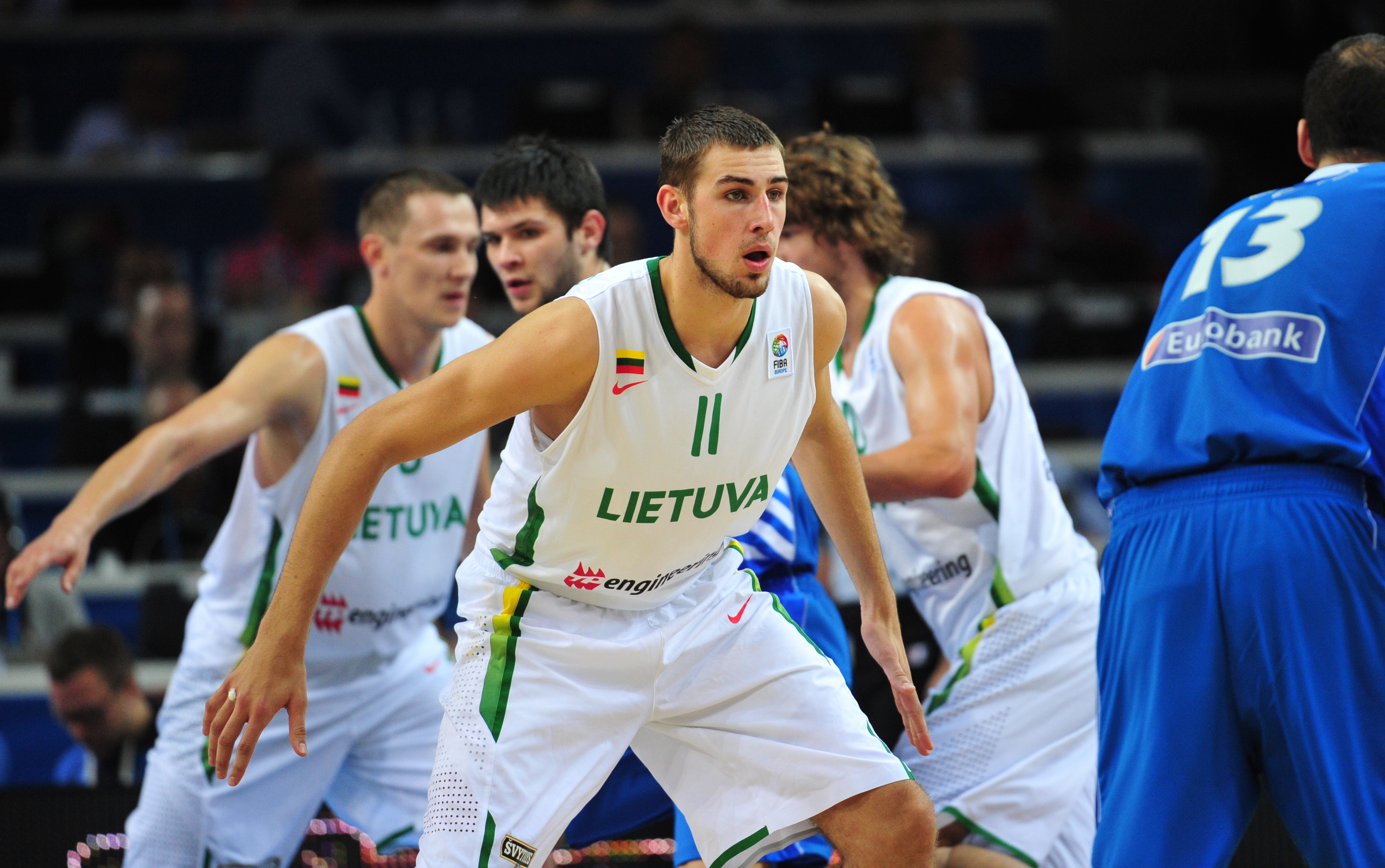
5th place game: Lithuania vs. Greece

All matches were played in: Žalgiris Arena, Kaunas

Quarter-finals
14 September
Spain	86
Slovenia	64
14 September
Macedonia	67
Lithuania	65
15 September
France	64
Greece	56
15 September
Russia	77
Serbia	67

Semi-finals
16 September
Spain	92
Macedonia	80
16 September
France	79
Russia	71

Final
18 September
Spain	98
France	85
Third place
18 September
Macedonia	68
Russia	72

5th place bracket

Semi-finals
15 September
Slovenia	77
Lithuania	80
16 September
Greece	87
Serbia	77

Fifth place
17 September
Lithuania	73
Greece	69
Seventh place
17 September
Slovenia	72
Serbia	68

=== Quarterfinals ===
14 September
18:00

Report

Spain	86–64	Slovenia
Scoring by quarter: 16–23, 19–8, 36–14, 15–19

Žalgiris Arena, Kaunas
Attendance: 11,000

14 September
21:00

Report

Macedonia	67–65	Lithuania
Scoring by quarter: 18–20, 12–14, 19–18, 18–13

Žalgiris Arena, Kaunas
Attendance: 15,000

15 September
18:00

Report

France	64–56	Greece
Scoring by quarter: 14–17, 13–14, 13–12, 24–13

Žalgiris Arena, Kaunas
Attendance: 9,000

15 September
21:00

Report

Russia	77–67	Serbia
Scoring by quarter: 16–12, 18–15, 20–21, 23–19

Žalgiris Arena, Kaunas
Attendance: 11,500

=== Classification 5–8 ===
15 September
15:30

Report

Slovenia	77–80	Lithuania
Scoring by quarter: 20–19, 13–25, 24–19, 20–17

Žalgiris Arena, Kaunas
Attendance: 11,000

16 September
15:00

Report

Greece	87–77	Serbia
Scoring by quarter: 34–8, 14–18, 16–22, 23–29

Žalgiris Arena, Kaunas
Attendance: 1,500

=== Semifinals ===
16 September
17:30

Report

Spain	92–80	Macedonia
Scoring by quarter: 26–18, 18–27, 27–17, 21–18

Žalgiris Arena, Kaunas
Attendance: 11,000

16 September
21:00

Report

France	79–71	Russia
Scoring by quarter: 17–16, 22–18, 16–13, 24–24

Žalgiris Arena, Kaunas
Attendance: 14,000

=== Seventh place game ===
17 September
18:00

Report

Slovenia	72–68	Serbia
Scoring by quarter: 27–20, 17–19, 20–12, 8–17

Žalgiris Arena, Kaunas
Attendance: 5,000

=== Fifth place game ===
17 September
21:00

Report

Lithuania	73–69	Greece
Scoring by quarter: 14–20, 18–17, 24–11, 17–21

Žalgiris Arena, Kaunas
Attendance: 14,000

=== Third place game ===
18 September
17:30

Report

Macedonia	68–72	Russia
Scoring by quarter: 13–17, 17–19, 20–16, 18–20

Žalgiris Arena, Kaunas
Attendance: 11,000

=== Final ===
18 September
21:00

Report

Spain	98–85	France
Scoring by quarter: 25–20, 25–21, 25–21, 23–23

Žalgiris Arena, Kaunas
Attendance: 14,500
Referees: Luigi Lamonica (ITA), Ilija Belosevic (SRB), Sreten Radovic (CRO)

EuroBasket 2011 champions

Spain
Second title

== Final standings ==
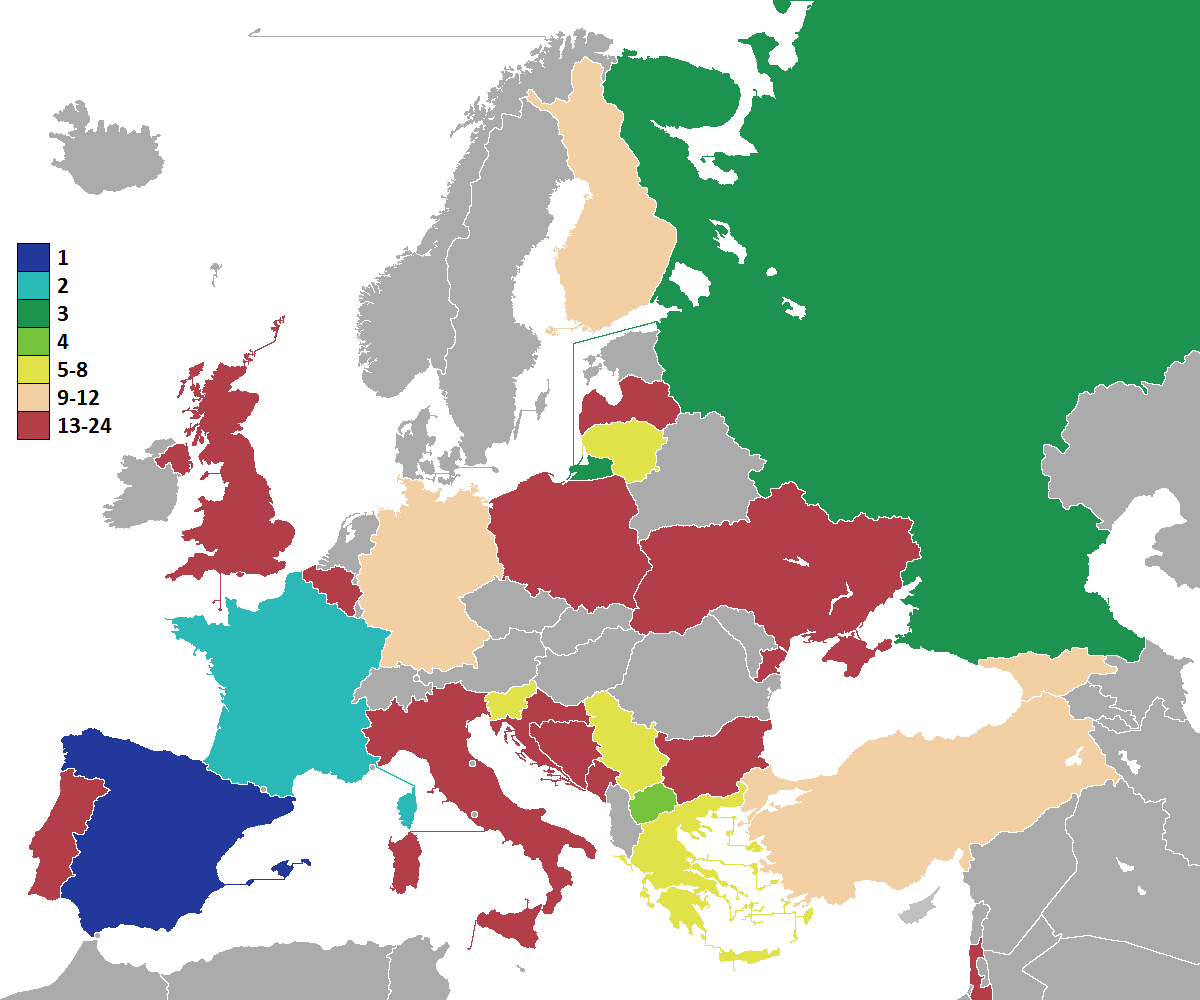
Results

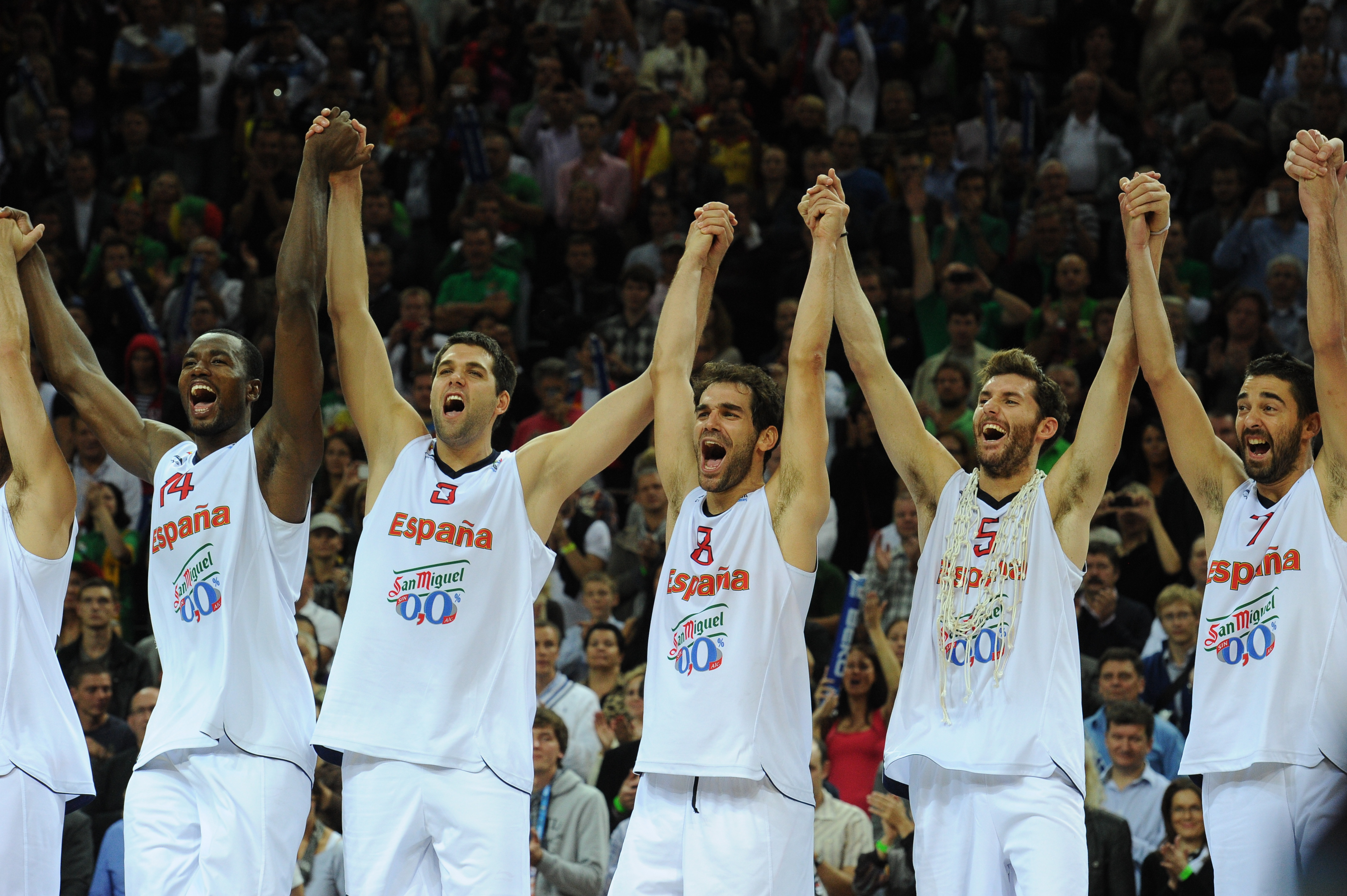
Spain became the Champions of Europe

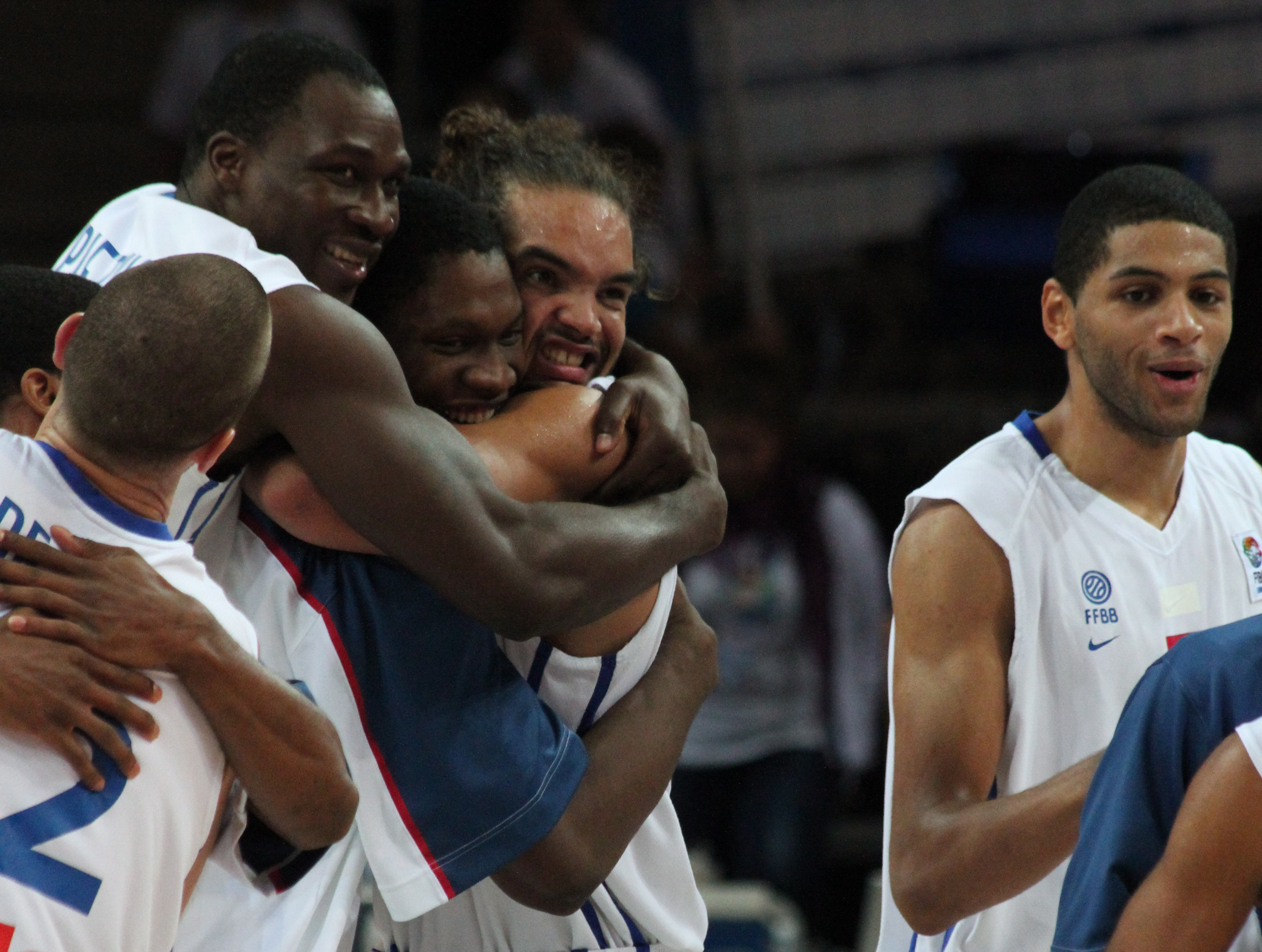
France won their second Silver medals

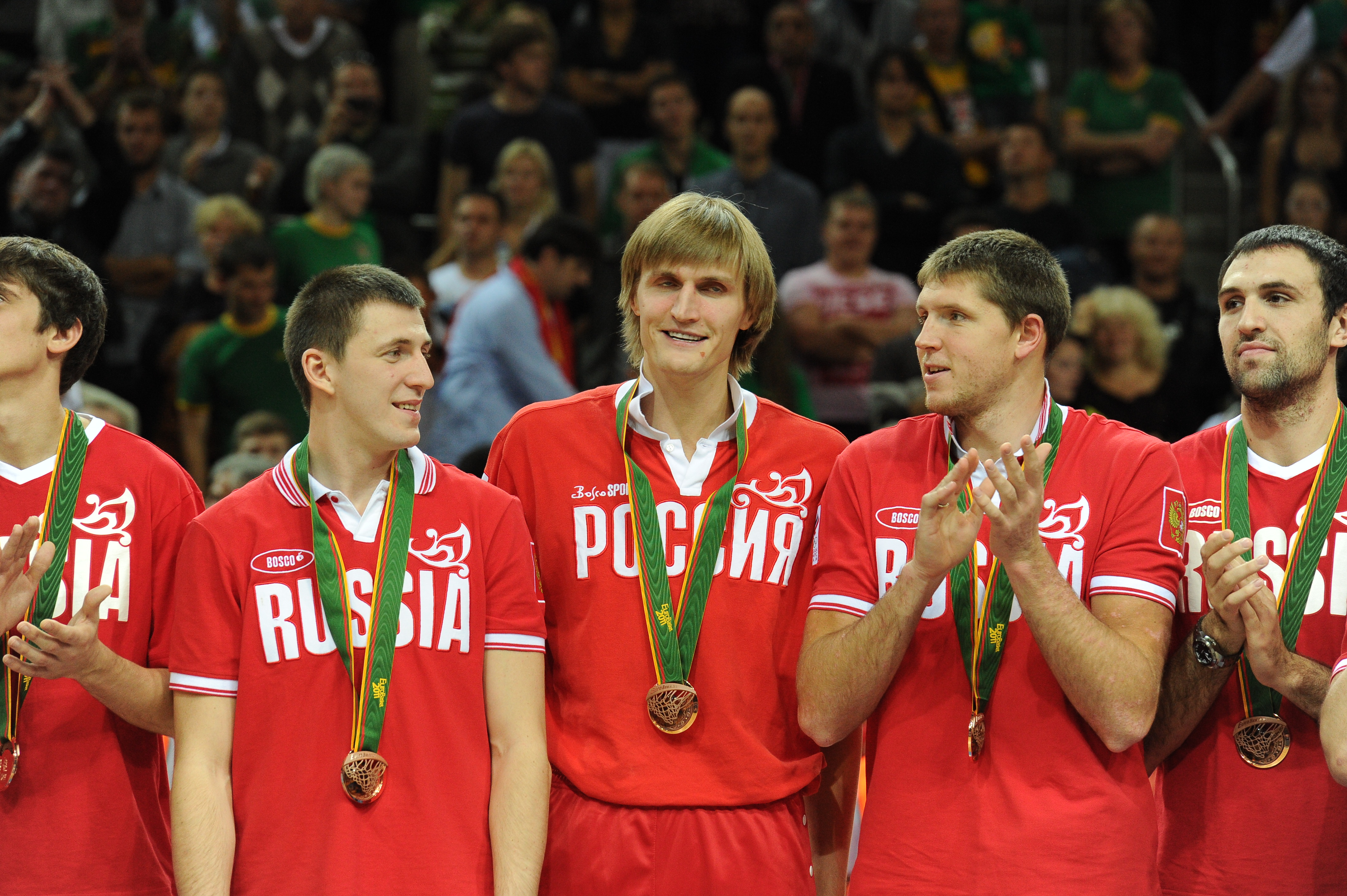
Russia won Bronze medals

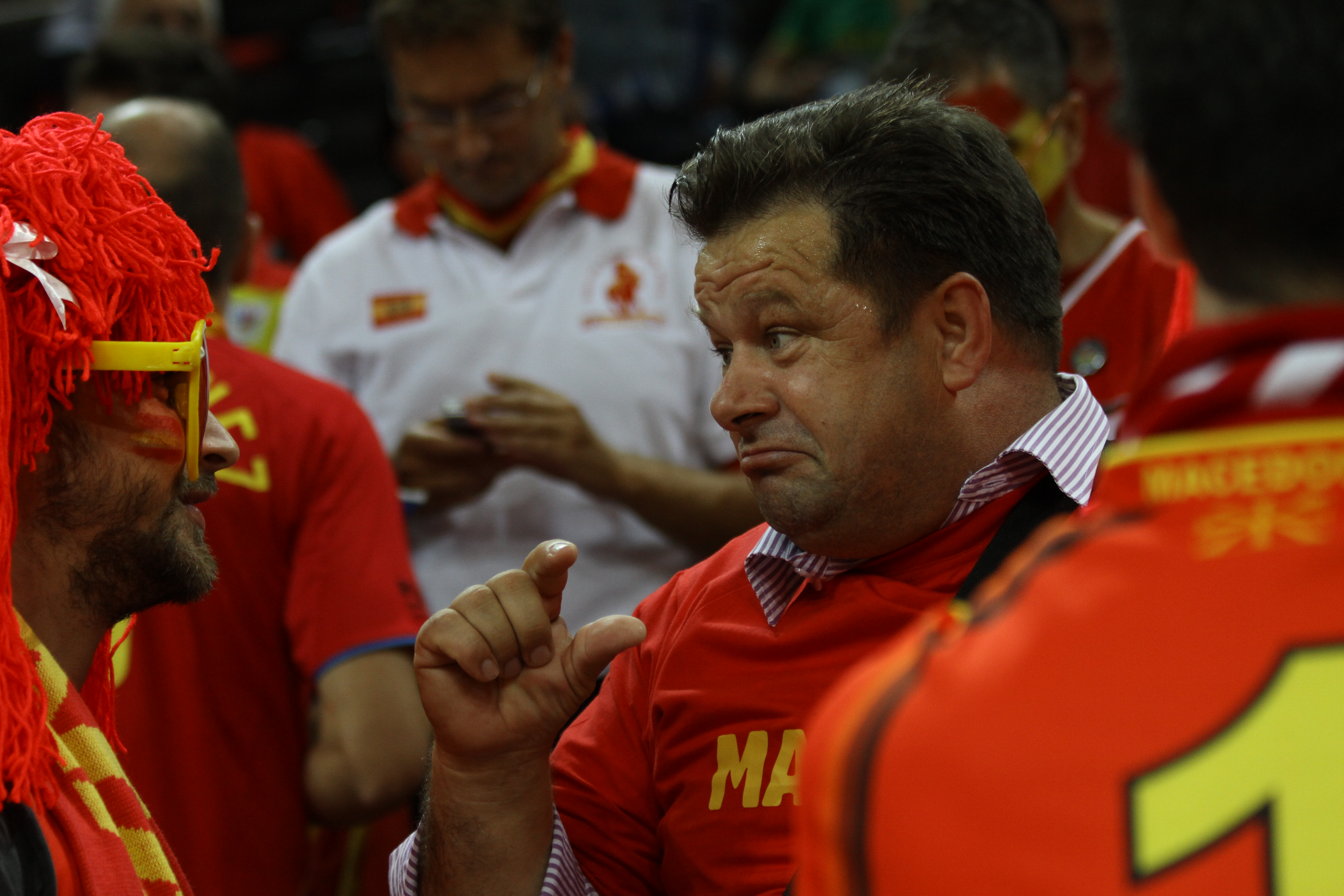
Macedonia was only one-step away from their first ever EuroBasket medal

The results of the championship included some surprises. Finland and Georgia, the latter supported by some 1,500 fans who had traveled to Lithuania, managed to reach the second stage despite being allowed to take part in the championship only after FIBA Europe decision. In fact Finland had the possibility of advancing to the quarterfinals until the very last game against Slovenia.

Croatia on the other hand was a powerful team that failed to reach even the second stage. Turkey with 5 NBA players failed to reach the quarterfinals.

The biggest surprise was probably Macedonia, a country that had had no major basketball victories prior to this championship. Having lost only two games in the first and second stages and these two by just a single point each (one of them after overtime) Macedonia easily advanced to the quarterfinals. In the quarterfinals the Macedonians defeated the hosts Lithuanians, and went to the semifinals.

A match between Georgia and Russia in Klaipėda was regarded to have political significance due to these countries having recently fought a war (the South Ossetia War). There were more than 1,000 Georgians and under 1,000 Russians in the arena during the game and large police forces were amassed to prevent possible riots. Despite the tight battle the Russians defeated the Georgians and prevented any surprise result. No riots happened.

These are the final standings. Two countries, Spain and France, qualified for the 2012 Summer Olympics basketball tournament outright. Four more qualified for the 2012 Olympic Qualifying Tournament, with Russia and Lithuania obtaining qualification through the tournament. In addition, Great Britain qualified as host.

Qualified for the 2012 Summer Olympics.
Qualified as host nation for the 2012 Summer Olympics.
Qualified for the 2012 FIBA World Olympic Qualifying Tournament.

Rank	Team	Record
1st place, gold medalist(s)	Spain	10–1
2nd place, silver medalist(s)	France	9–2
3rd place, bronze medalist(s)	Russia	10–1
4	Macedonia	7–4
5	Lithuania	8–3
6	Greece	7–4
7	Slovenia	6–5
8	Serbia	5–6
9-10	Germany	4–4
9-10	Finland	3–5
11-12	Turkey	3–5
11-12	Georgia	2–6
13-16	Croatia	2–3
13-16	Bulgaria	2–3
13-16	Great Britain	2–3
13-16	Israel	2–3
17-20	Ukraine	2–3
17-20	Poland	2–3
17-20	Bosnia and Herzegovina	2–3
17-20	Italy	1–4
21-24	Montenegro	1–4
21-24	Latvia	0–5
21-24	Belgium	0–5
21-24	Portugal	0–5

== Statistical leaders ==
=== Individual Tournament Highs ===
Points

Rank	Name	G	Pts	PPG
1	(France) Tony Parker	10	221	22.1
2	(North Macedonia) Bo McCalebb	11	235	21.4
3	(Spain) Pau Gasol	10	201	20.1
4	(Germany) Dirk Nowitzki	8	156	19.5
5	(Spain) Juan Carlos Navarro	11	206	18.7
6	(Serbia) Nenad Krstić	10	155	15.5
7	(Germany) Chris Kaman	8	124	15.5
8	(Russia) Andrei Kirilenko	10	146	14.6
9	(France) Nicolas Batum	10	142	14.2
10	(Spain) Marc Gasol	10	135	13.5

Rebounds

Rank	Name	G	Rbs	RPG
1	(Germany) Chris Kaman	8	80	10.0
2	(North Macedonia) Pero Antić	10	88	8.8
3	(Turkey) Ömer Aşık	8	68	8.5
4	(Spain) Pau Gasol	9	73	8.1
5	(France) Joakim Noah	9	72	8.0
5	(Georgia (country)) Viktor Sanikidze	8	64	8.0
7	(Spain) Marc Gasol	10	74	7.4
8	(Germany) Dirk Nowitzki	8	53	6.6
9	(Turkey) Ersan İlyasova	8	52	6.5
10	(Slovenia) Mirza Begić	11	71	6.5

Assists

Rank	Name	G	Ast	APG
1	(Serbia) Miloš Teodosić	11	63	5.7
2	(Russia) Victor Khryapa	10	51	5.1
3	(Lithuania) Šarūnas Jasikevičius	11	51	4.6
4	(Finland) Teemu Rannikko	8	36	4.5
5	(France) Tony Parker	9	39	4.3
6	(Germany) Heiko Schaffartzik	8	31	3.9
7	(Lithuania) Mantas Kalnietis	11	42	3.8
7	(Greece) Nick Calathes	11	42	3.8
9	(North Macedonia) Bo McCalebb	11	41	3.7
10	(Georgia (country)) Giorgi Tsintsadze	6	20	3.3

Steals

Rank	Name	G	Stl	SPG
1	(Russia) Andrei Kirilenko	10	29	2.9
2	(France) Nicolas Batum	10	21	2.1
3	(North Macedonia) Bo McCalebb	11	23	2.1
4	(Finland) Tuukka Kotti	8	15	1.9
5	(North Macedonia) Vojdan Stojanovski	10	18	1.8
6	(France) Tony Parker	9	15	1.7
7	(Slovenia) Goran Dragić	11	18	1.6
7	(Greece) Nick Calathes	11	18	1.6
9	(Spain) Rudy Fernández	10	16	1.6
10	(Georgia (country)) Manuchar Markoishvili	8	12	1.5

Blocks

Rank	Name	G	Blk	BPG
1	(Slovenia) Mirza Begić	11	21	1.9
2	(Germany) Chris Kaman	8	14	1.8
3	(Spain) Pau Gasol	10	17	1.7
4	(Russia) Timofey Mozgov	10	15	1.5
4	(Turkey) Ömer Aşık	8	12	1.5
6	(Spain) Serge Ibaka	11	13	1.2
7	(Lithuania) Jonas Valančiūnas	10	11	1.1
8	(Greece) Kosta Koufos	11	12	1.1
9	(North Macedonia) Predrag Samardžiski	11	10	0.9
10	(North Macedonia) Todor Gečevski	6	5	0.8

Minutes

Rank	Name	G	Min	MPG
1	(North Macedonia) Vlado Ilievski	10	375	37.5
2	(France) Tony Parker	9	311	34.6
3	(North Macedonia) Pero Antić	10	344	34.4
4	(North Macedonia) Bo McCalebb	11	376	34.2
5	(Georgia (country)) Manuchar Markoishvili	8	260	32.5
6	(Georgia (country)) Viktor Sanikidze	8	257	32.1
7	(France) Nicolas Batum	10	314	31.4
8	(Finland) Petteri Koponen	8	250	31.3
9	(Germany) Heiko Schaffartzik	8	241	30.1
10	(Germany) Dirk Nowitzki	8	239	29.9

=== Individual Game Highs ===
Department	Name	Total	Opponent
Points	(Italy) Andrea Bargnani	36	Latvia
Rebounds	(North Macedonia) Pero Antić	19	Finland
Assists	(Croatia) Dontaye Draper	12	Montenegro
Steals	(France) Nicolas Batum (France) Tony Parker	6	Israel; Serbia
Blocks	(Spain) Serge Ibaka	5	France
2-point field goal percentage	(United Kingdom) Joel Freeland	100% (11/11)	Poland
3-point field goal percentage	(North Macedonia) Vojdan Stojanovski	100% (5/5)	Lithuania
Free throw percentage	(France) Tony Parker (Portugal) Miguel Minhava	100% (12/12)	Serbia; Great Britain
Turnovers	(Serbia) Miloš Teodosić	9	Russia

=== Team Tournament Highs ===
Offensive PPG

Pos.	Name	PPG
1	Spain	85.2
2	Lithuania	82.3
3	Serbia	81.1
4	Poland	80.2
5	Israel	79.8
6	Croatia	79.2
7	France	79.1
8	Latvia	77.0
9	Bosnia and Herzegovina	76.0
9	Italy	76.0

Defensive PPG

Pos.	Name	PPG
1	Russia	63.3
2	Macedonia	65.2
3	Ukraine	65.4
4	Greece	65.7
5	Turkey	67.8
6	Slovenia	68.7
7	Spain	69.3
8	Georgia	71.0
9	Bulgaria	71.4
10	Finland	73.1
10	Germany	73.1

Rebounds

Pos.	Name	RPG
1	Lithuania	39
2	Spain	38.7
3	Georgia	37.6
4	Turkey	37.1
5	Slovenia	36.4
6	Macedonia	35.4
7	Russia	34.7
8	Germany	34.5
9	Serbia	34.5
10	France	34.2

Assists

Pos.	Name	APG
1	Spain	19.2
2	Russia	19.0
3	Lithuania	17.7
4	Croatia	17.4
5	Serbia	17.3
6	Poland	15.4
7	Israel	14.8
8	Finland	14.6
9	Belgium	14.6
10	Montenegro	13.8

Steals

Pos.	Name	SPG
1	Spain	8.6
2	Macedonia	8.4
3	France	7.6
4	Great Britain	7.6
5	Slovenia	7.5
6	Russia	7.5
7	Portugal	7.2
8	Greece	7.1
9	Poland	7.0
10	Israel	6.4

Blocks

Pos.	Name	BPG
1	Greece	3.7
2	Turkey	3.4
3	Russia	3.3
4	Spain	3.1
5	Ukraine	3.0
6	Germany	2.6
7	Italy	2.6
8	France	2.4
9	Lithuania	2.2
10	Great Britain	2.2

2-point field goal percentage

Pos.	Name	%
1	Bosnia and Herzegovina	58.3
2	Poland	56.3
3	Lithuania	55.4
4	Croatia	54.7
5	Russia	54.6
6	Georgia	52.9
7	Spain	52.8
8	Turkey	52.0
9	Serbia	51.6
10	France	51.5

3-point field goal percentage

Pos.	Name	%
1	Lithuania	41.1
2	Germany	39.2
3	Finland	39.1
4	Bosnia and Herzegovina	36.6
5	Ukraine	36.3
6	Serbia	36.1
7	France	35.7
8	Russia	35.6
9	Belgium	35.6
10	Latvia	35.5

Free throw percentage

Pos.	Name	%
1	Italy	84.6
2	France	81.3
3	Germany	80.1
4	Spain	79.7
5	Greece	79.5
6	Serbia	79.4
7	Croatia	78.9
8	Portugal	78.4
9	Macedonia	77.7
10	Poland	75.8

=== Team Game highs ===
Department	Name	Total	Opponent
Points	Lithuania	100	Serbia
Rebounds	Montenegro	50	Macedonia
Assists	Croatia	26	Montenegro
Steals	France; Russia	14	Serbia; Finland
Blocks	Spain	10	France
2-point field goal percentage	Lithuania	78.4% (29/37)	Poland
3-point field goal percentage	Lithuania	63.3% (7/11)	Portugal
Free throw percentage	Spain	100% (16/16)	Great Britain
Turnovers	Montenegro; Ukraine	23	Macedonia; Georgia

== All-Tournament Team ==
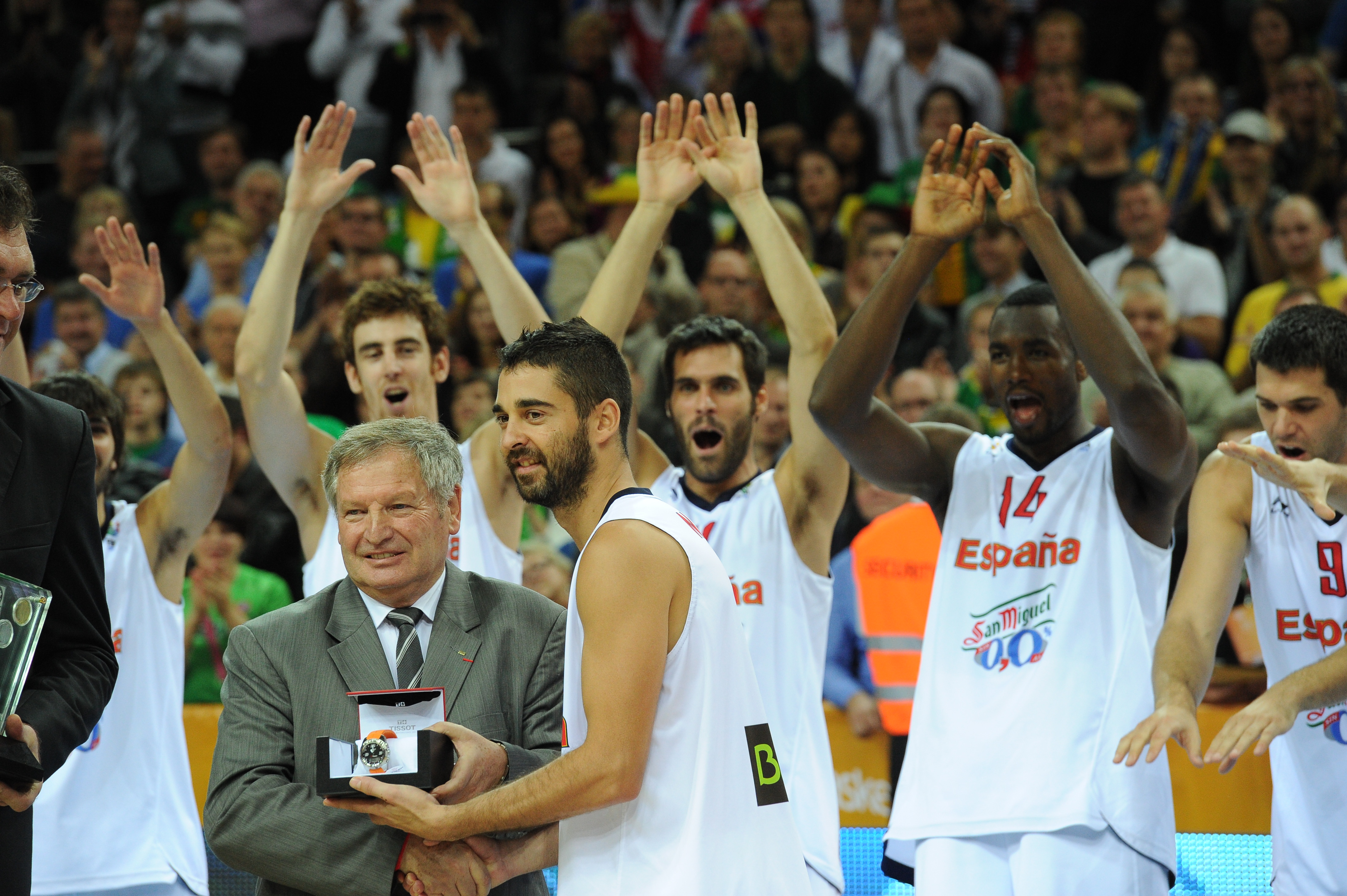
Juan Carlos Navarro was named MVP

The following players were named to the All-Tournament Team:

PG – (France) Tony Parker

SG – (North Macedonia) Bo McCalebb

SF – (Spain) Juan Carlos Navarro (MVP)

PF – (Russia) Andrei Kirilenko

C – (Spain) Pau Gasol
