= Alytus Arena =

Sports venue in Alytus, Lithuania

- Alytaus Sporto ir Rekreacijos centras
- Interactive map of Alytus Arena
- Full name: Alytaus Sporto ir Rekreacijos centras
- Former names: Alytaus sporto rūmai
- Address: Naujoji g. 52
- Location: Alytus, Lithuania
- Coordinates: 54°24′14″N 24°01′20″E
- Capacity: Basketball: 5,500; Concerts: 7,000

Construction
- Opened: 1977; 12 February 2011
- Renovated: 2009–2011
- Expanded: 2009–2011
- Cost: 10 million EUR

Tenants
- BC Alita (1995–2005); BC Alytus (2011); BC Dzūkija (2012–2022); BC Wolves (2022–2023)

Website
- asrc.lt

The Alytus Arena is a universal indoor arena in Alytus, Lithuania. It was opened in 1977. Its reconstruction began in 2009 and was completed by the end of 2010. The arena was officially opened on 12 February 2011. The arena hosted the Group C games of EuroBasket 2011 from 31 August 2011 to 5 September 2011.

== League attendances ==
This is a list of league games attendances of BC Dzūkija at Alytus Arena.

Season	Total	High	Low	Average
2012–13 NKL	24,348	2,311	342	1,217
2013–14 LKL	22,380	2,831	913	1,316
2014–15 LKL	36,173	2,950	550	1,644
2015–16 LKL	41,617	4,503	1,145	2,312
2016–17 LKL	33,927	3,156	731	1,786
2017–18 LKL	32,512	3,764	415	1,806
2018–19 LKL	30,483	4,217	813	1,604
2019–20 LKL	14,991	2,972	358	1,363

== See also ==
- List of indoor arenas in Lithuania
