= EuroBasket 2011 Group D =

Group D of the EuroBasket 2011 took place between 31 August and 5 September 2011. The group played all of its games at Klaipėda Arena in Klaipėda, Lithuania.

The group was composed of Bulgaria, Georgia, Russia, Ukraine, Belgium and Slovenia. Georgia was playing in its first ever European Basketball Championship after finishing second at the qualification group C. The three best ranked teams advanced to the second round.

== Standings ==
Team	Pld	W	L	PF	PA	GA	Pts.	Tie
Russia	5	5	0	371	321	1.155	10	
Slovenia	5	4	1	356	324	1.098	9	
Georgia	5	2	3	352	343	1.026	7	1–1, 1.045
Bulgaria	5	2	3	339	357	0.949	7	1–1, 0.993
Ukraine	5	2	3	322	327	0.984	7	1–1, 0.960
Belgium	5	0	5	304	372	0.817	5	

All times are local (UTC+3)

== 31 August ==
=== Belgium vs. Georgia ===
31 August 2011
15:30

Report

Belgium	59–81	Georgia
Scoring by quarter: 11–20, 13–17, 18–21, 17–23
Pts: Beghin 13; Rebs: Beghin 6 Asts: Beghin, Van Rossom 4		Pts: Pachulia 16; Rebs: Sanikidze 11; Asts: three players 4

Klaipėda Arena, Klaipėda
Attendance: 1,800
Referees: Ilija Belosevic (SRB), Seffi Shemmesh (ISR), Csaba Cziffra (HUN)

=== Slovenia vs. Bulgaria ===
31 August 2011
18:00

Report

Slovenia	67–59	Bulgaria
Scoring by quarter: 17–13, 12–12, 18–15, 20–19
Pts: Lorbek 18; Rebs: Lorbek 9 Asts: Dragić 6		Pts: Rowland 20; Rebs: Ivanov 11; Asts: Ivanov 2

Klaipėda Arena, Klaipėda
Attendance: 1,300
Referees: Juan Arteaga (ESP), Olegs Latisevs (LAT), Tomas Jasevicius (LTU)

=== Russia vs. Ukraine ===
31 August 2011
21:00

Report

Russia	73–64	Ukraine
Scoring by quarter: 15–11, 13–13, 25–26, 20–14
Pts: Kirilenko 20; Rebs: Kirilenko 11; Asts: Khryapa 4		Pts: Lishouk 13; Rebs: Pecherov 9 Asts: Bertt 6

Klaipėda Arena, Klaipėda
Attendance: 2,300
Referees: Fabio Facchini (ITA), Murat Biricik (TUR), Oliver Krause (GER)

== 1 September ==
=== Bulgaria vs. Belgium ===
1 September 2011
15:30

Report

Bulgaria	68–65	Belgium
Scoring by quarter: 14–13, 18–20, 24–19, 12–13
Pts: Rowland 22; Rebs: Videnov 8 Asts: Rowland 2		Pts: Van Rossom 17; Rebs: van den Spiegel 8 Asts: Lauwers 4

Klaipėda Arena, Klaipėda
Attendance: 1,000
Referees: Fabio Facchini (ITA), Oliver Krause (GER), Neil Wilkinson (ENG)

=== Georgia vs. Russia ===
1 September 2011
18:00

Report

Georgia	58–65	Russia
Scoring by quarter: 16–20, 11–20, 18–12, 13–13
Pts: Markoishvili 21; Rebs: Sanikidze 8 Asts: Tsintsadze 3		Pts: Kirilenko 20; Rebs: Khryapa 6 Asts: Khryapa 7

Klaipėda Arena, Klaipėda
Attendance: 2,100
Referees: Juan Arteaga (ESP), Tomas Jasevicius (LTU), Murat Biricik (TUR)

=== Ukraine vs. Slovenia ===
1 September 2011
21:00

Report

Ukraine	64–68	Slovenia
Scoring by quarter: 12–18, 8–23, 18–16, 26–11
Pts: Bertt 14; Rebs: Lishouk 5 Asts: Bertt 5		Pts: Begić 14; Rebs: Begić, Murić 7 Asts: Lakovič 6

Klaipėda Arena, Klaipėda
Attendance: 2,800
Referees: Ilija Belosevic (SRB), Seffi Shemmesh (ISR), Olegs Latisevs (LAT)

== 3 September ==
=== Ukraine vs. Bulgaria ===
3 September 2011
15:30

Report

Ukraine	67–56	Bulgaria
Scoring by quarter: 16–14, 18–11, 19–13, 14–18
Pts: Kolchenko 18; Rebs: Kravtsov 10; Asts: Bertt 4		Pts: Kostov, Videnov 10; Rebs: Videnov, Varbanov 8 Asts: Rowland 5

Klaipėda Arena, Klaipėda
Attendance: 900
Referees: Ilija Belosevic (SRB), Tomas Jasevicius (LTU), Neil Wilkinson (ENG)

=== Slovenia vs. Georgia ===
3 September 2011
18:00

Report

Slovenia	87–75	Georgia
Scoring by quarter: 15–25, 25–15, 19–18, 28–17
Pts: Lakovič 22; Rebs: Lorbek 6 Asts: Dragić 5		Pts: Pachulia 22; Rebs: Shengelia 7 Asts: Tsintsadze 6

Klaipėda Arena, Klaipėda
Attendance: 2,500
Referees: Juan Arteaga (ESP), Seffi Shemmesh (ISR), Oliver Krause (GER)

=== Russia vs. Belgium ===
3 September 2011
21:00

Report

Russia	79–58	Belgium
Scoring by quarter: 21–16, 16–16, 20–16, 22–10
Pts: Fridzon 22; Rebs: Khryapa 10; Asts: Bykov 7		Pts: Faison 14; Rebs: De Zeeuw 12; Asts: three players 2

Klaipėda Arena, Klaipėda
Attendance: 2,900
Referees: Fabio Facchini (ITA), Olegs Latisevs (LAT), Csaba Cziffra (HUN)

== 4 September ==
=== Georgia vs. Ukraine ===
4 September 2011
15:30

Report

Georgia	69–53	Ukraine
Scoring by quarter: 10–17, 20–16, 21–11, 18–9
Pts: Tsintsadze, Markoishvili 14; Rebs: Sanikidze 12; Asts: Markoishvili 5		Pts: Bertt, Pecherov 11; Rebs: three players 4 Asts: Bertt, Zabirchenko 5

Klaipėda Arena, Klaipėda
Attendance: 1,800
Referees: Fabio Facchini (ITA), Olegs Latisevs (LAT), Murat Biricik (TUR)

=== Bulgaria vs. Russia ===
4 September 2011
18:00

Report

Bulgaria	77–89	Russia
Scoring by quarter: 18–23, 20–19, 21–25, 18–22
Pts: Ivanov 23; Rebs: Ivanov 8 Asts: Rowland 4		Pts: Kirilenko 25; Rebs: three players 5 Asts: Khryapa 8

Klaipėda Arena, Klaipėda
Attendance: 1,800
Referees: Juan Arteaga (ESP), Seffi Shemmesh (ISR), Csaba Cziffra (HUN)

=== Belgium vs. Slovenia ===
4 September 2011
21:00

Report

Belgium	61–70	Slovenia
Scoring by quarter: 15–14, 15–15, 17–21, 14–20
Pts: van den Spiegel 16; Rebs: van den Spiegel 7 Asts: Van Rossom 7		Pts: Dragić 18; Rebs: Begić 7 Asts: three players 3

Klaipėda Arena, Klaipėda
Attendance: 900
Referees: Ilija Belosevic (SRB), Tomas Jasevicius (LTU), Neil Wilkinson (ENG)

== 5 September ==
=== Georgia vs. Bulgaria ===
5 September 2011
15:30

Report

Georgia	69–79	Bulgaria
Scoring by quarter: 15–19, 22–15, 18–18, 14–27
Pts: Sanikidze 18; Rebs: Sanikidze 9 Asts: Sanikidze, Boisa 3		Pts: Rowland 25; Rebs: Ivanov 9 Asts: Videnov 7

Klaipėda Arena, Klaipėda
Attendance: 2,000
Referees: Fabio Facchini (ITA), Tomas Jasevicius (LTU), Oliver Krause (GER)

=== Slovenia vs. Russia ===
5 September 2011
18:00

Report

Slovenia	64–65	Russia
Scoring by quarter: 19–16, 21–18, 15–19, 9–12
Pts: Lorbek 14; Rebs: Slokar 9 Asts: Lorbek 5		Pts: Vorontsevich 18; Rebs: Monya 7 Asts: Bykov 5

Klaipėda Arena, Klaipėda
Attendance: 4,300
Referees: Juan Arteaga (ESP), Ilija Belosevic (SRB), Olegs Latisevs (LAT)

=== Ukraine vs. Belgium ===
5 September 2011
21:00

Report

Ukraine	74–61	Belgium
Scoring by quarter: 13–16, 30–10, 13–13, 18–22
Pts: Pecherov 15; Rebs: Kravtsov 16; Asts: Lukashov 6		Pts: Van Rossom 17; Rebs: De Zeeuw 6 Asts: Lauwers 6

Klaipėda Arena, Klaipėda
Attendance: 1,300
Referees: Seffi Shemmesh (ISR), Murat Biricik (TUR), Neil Wilkinson (ENG)
