= EuroBasket 2011 Group C =

Group C of the EuroBasket 2011 took place between 31 August and 5 September 2011. The group played all of its games at Alytus Arena in Alytus, Lithuania.

The group was composed of Bosnia and Herzegovina, Macedonia, Croatia, Montenegro, Greece and Finland, who qualified from additional qualifying round. Montenegro was playing in its first ever European Basketball Championship after finishing first at the qualification group A. The three best ranked teams advanced to the second round.

== Standings ==
Team	Pld	W	L	PF	PA	GA	Pts.	Tie
Macedonia	5	4	1	362	337	1.074	9	1–0
Greece	5	4	1	360	324	1.129	9	0–1
Finland	5	2	3	373	366	1.019	7	1–1, 1.155
Croatia	5	2	3	396	404	0.980	7	1–1, 0.959
Bosnia and Herzegovina	5	2	3	380	409	0.929	7	1–1, 0.907
Montenegro	5	1	4	357	388	0.921	6	

All times are local (UTC+3)

== 31 August ==
=== Montenegro vs. Macedonia ===
31 August 2011
15:30

Report

Montenegro	70–65 (OT)	Macedonia
Scoring by quarter: 15–14, 10–16, 24–19, 12–12, Overtime: 9–4
Pts: Dasic 20; Rebs: Dasic 16; Asts: Jeretin, Cook 4		Pts: McCalebb 17; Rebs: Samardziski 11; Asts: McCalebb 4

Alytus Arena, Alytus
Attendance: 700
Referees: Luigi Lamonica (ITA), Marek Cmikiewicz (POL), Emin Mogulkoc (TUR)

=== Greece vs. Bosnia and Herzegovina ===
31 August 2011
18:00

Report

Greece	76–67	Bosnia and Herzegovina
Scoring by quarter: 15–17, 16–17, 24–15, 21–18
Pts: Zisis, Calathes 13; Rebs: Koufos 10; Asts: Zisis 4		Pts: Kikanovic 15; Rebs: Domercant 6 Asts: Vasiljevic 5

Alytus Arena, Alytus
Attendance: 800
Referees: Miguel Perez Perez (ESP), Milivoje Jovcic (SRB), Juris Kokainis (LAT)

=== Croatia vs. Finland ===
31 August 2011
21:00

Report

Croatia	84–79	Finland
Scoring by quarter: 25–26, 16–17, 19–13, 24–23
Pts: Bogdanović 27; Rebs: Tomić 8 Asts: three players 3		Pts: Koponen 14; Rebs: Kotti 9 Asts: Koponen 6

Alytus Arena, Alytus
Attendance: 800
Referees: Robert Lottermoser (GER), David Chambon (FRA), Fernando Rocha (POR)

== 1 September ==
=== Bosnia and Herzegovina vs. Montenegro ===
1 September 2011
15:30

Report

Bosnia and Herzegovina	94–86	Montenegro
Scoring by quarter: 25–19, 23–22, 19–27, 27–18
Pts: Teletović 23; Rebs: Vasiljević 6 Asts: Đedović 5		Pts: Peković, Cook 16; Rebs: Dašić 11; Asts: Dašić 7

Alytus Arena, Alytus
Attendance: 500
Referees: Luigi Lamonica (ITA), David Chambon (FRA), Jurgis Laurinavicius (LTU)

=== Finland vs. Greece ===
1 September 2011
18:00

Report

Finland	61–81	Greece
Scoring by quarter: 14–20, 18–21, 12–16, 17–24
Pts: Koponen 21; Rebs: Kotti 4 Asts: Rannikko 4		Pts: Bourousis 19; Rebs: Bourousis 10; Asts: Xanthopoulos 6

Alytus Arena, Alytus
Attendance: 700
Referees: Miguel Perez Perez (ESP), Juris Kokainis (LAT), Emin Mogulkoc (TUR)

=== Macedonia vs. Croatia ===
1 September 2011
21:00

Report

Macedonia	78–76	Croatia
Scoring by quarter: 21–18, 16–23, 23–21, 18–14
Pts: McCalebb 19; Rebs: Gecevski 8 Asts: McCalebb 5		Pts: Draper 13; Rebs: Tomić 7 Asts: Draper 6

Alytus Arena, Alytus
Attendance: 800
Referees: Robert Lottermoser (GER), Milivoje Jovcic (SRB), Fernando Rocha (POR)

== 3 September ==
=== Finland vs. Bosnia and Herzegovina ===
3 September 2011
15:30

Report

Finland	92–64	Bosnia and Herzegovina
Scoring by quarter: 24–20, 18–18, 34–18, 16–8
Pts: Koivisto 17; Rebs: Salin 7 Asts: Rannikko 6		Pts: Domercant 25; Rebs: Teletović 6 Asts: Vasiljević 4

Alytus Arena, Alytus
Attendance: 1,600
Referees: Robert Lottermoser (GER), Milivoje Jovcic (SRB), Fernando Rocha (POR)

=== Greece vs. Macedonia ===
3 September 2011
18:00

Report

Greece	58–72	Macedonia
Scoring by quarter: 18–16, 11–14, 18–20, 11–22
Pts: Fotsis 16; Rebs: Bourousis 10; Asts: Bourousis, Zisis 4		Pts: McCalebb 27; Rebs: Antić 8 Asts: McCalebb 4

Alytus Arena, Alytus
Attendance: 2,200
Referees: Luigi Lamonica (ITA), David Chambon (FRA), Jurgis Laurinavicius (LTU)

=== Croatia vs. Montenegro ===
3 September 2011
21:00

Report

Croatia	87–81	Montenegro
Scoring by quarter: 24–16, 22–26, 21–18, 20–21
Pts: Tomić 26; Rebs: Tomić 8 Asts: Draper 12		Pts: Jeretin 18; Rebs: Vraneš, Dašić 6 Asts: Cook 8

Alytus Arena, Alytus
Attendance: 2,400
Referees: Miguel Perez Perez (ESP), Marek Cmikiewicz (POL), Emin Mogulkoc (TUR)

== 4 September ==
=== Macedonia vs. Finland ===
4 September 2011
15:30

Report

Macedonia	72–70	Finland
Scoring by quarter: 20–21, 18–19, 16–18, 18–12
Pts: McCalebb 18; Rebs: Antić 19; Asts: Ilievski, Antić 4		Pts: Koivisto, Koponen 11; Rebs: Kotti 5 Asts: Rannikko 10

Alytus Arena, Alytus
Attendance: 1,200
Referees: Miguel Perez Perez (ESP), Emin Mogulkoc (TUR), Juris Kokainis (LAT)

=== Montenegro vs. Greece ===
4 September 2011
18:00

Report

Montenegro	55–71	Greece
Scoring by quarter: 18–21, 13–11, 10–26, 14–13
Pts: Peković 15; Rebs: Peković 7 Asts: Jeretin 3		Pts: Koufos 19; Rebs: Bramos 9 Asts: Calathes 6

Alytus Arena, Alytus
Attendance: 1,000
Referees: Robert Lottermoser (GER), Milivoje Jovcic (SRB), Fernando Rocha (POR)

=== Bosnia and Herzegovina vs. Croatia ===
4 September 2011
21:00

Report

Bosnia and Herzegovina	92–80	Croatia
Scoring by quarter: 28–28, 15–8, 21–23, 28–21
Pts: Teletović 26; Rebs: Teletović 9 Asts: Vasiljević 7		Pts: Tomić 23; Rebs: Draper 6 Asts: Draper 9

Alytus Arena, Alytus
Attendance: 500
Referees: Luigi Lamonica (ITA), Marek Cmikiewicz (POL), Jurgis Laurinavicius (LTU)

== 5 September ==
=== Finland vs. Montenegro ===
5 September 2011
15:30

Report

Finland	71–65	Montenegro
Scoring by quarter: 25–14, 11–26, 21–14, 14–11
Pts: Lee 12; Rebs: Huff, Kotti 8 Asts: Ranniko, Koponen 4		Pts: Pekovic 16; Rebs: Mihailovic 7 Asts: Mihailovic 4

Alytus Arena, Alytus
Attendance: 1,350
Referees: Marek Cmikiewicz (POL), David Chambon (FRA), Jurgis Laurinavicius (LTU)

=== Greece vs. Croatia ===
5 September 2011
18:00

Report

Greece	74–69	Croatia
Scoring by quarter: 25–13, 19–14, 14–18, 16–24
Pts: Vasileiadis, Fotsis 17; Rebs: Calathes 8 Asts: Zisis, Calathes 4		Pts: Marko Popović, Barać 14; Rebs: Andrić 8 Asts: Draper 5

Alytus Arena, Alytus
Attendance: 1,200
Referees: Miguel Perez Perez (ESP), Robert Lottermoser (GER), Juris Kokainis (LAT)

=== Macedonia vs. Bosnia and Herzegovina ===
5 September 2011
21:00

Report

Macedonia	75–63	Bosnia and Herzegovina
Scoring by quarter: 16–17, 19–21, 18–9, 22–16
Pts: McCalebb 22; Rebs: Antić 14; Asts: Ilievski 7		Pts: Đedović 15; Rebs: Teletović, Đedović 7 Asts: Vasiljević 7

Alytus Arena, Alytus
Attendance: 600
Referees: Luigi Lamonica (ITA), Milivoje Jovcic (SRB), Fernando Rocha (POR)
