= EuroBasket 2011 Group A =

Group A of the EuroBasket 2011 took place between 31 August and 5 September 2011. The group played all of its games at Cido Arena in Panevėžys, Lithuania.

The group was composed of Poland, Great Britain, Turkey, host Lithuania, defending champions Spain and Portugal, who qualified from additional qualifying round. The three best ranked teams advanced to the second round.

== Standings ==
Team	Pld	W	L	PF	PA	GA	Pts.	Tie
Spain	5	4	1	404	364	1.109	9	1–0
Lithuania	5	4	1	429	374	1.147	9	0–1
Turkey	5	3	2	385	333	1.156	8	
Great Britain	5	2	3	372	410	0.907	7	1–0
Poland	5	2	3	401	424	0.945	7	0–1
Portugal	5	0	5	344	430	0.800	5	

All times are local (UTC+3)

== 31 August ==
=== Spain vs. Poland ===
31 August 2011
15:15

BoxScore

Spain	83–78	Poland
Scoring by quarter: 22–15, 22–16, 17–21, 22–26
Pts: P. Gasol 29; Rebs: P. Gasol, M. Gasol 7 Asts: San Emeterio, Sada 3		Pts: Koszarek 19; Rebs: Hrycaniuk 9 Asts: Kelati 7

Cido Arena, Panevėžys
Attendance: 1,500
Referees: Damir Javor (SLO), Sergey Mikhaylov (RUS), Petri Mäntylä (FIN)

=== Turkey vs. Portugal ===
31 August 2011
17:45

Report

Turkey	79–56	Portugal
Scoring by quarter: 15–9, 24–18, 25–11, 15–18
Pts: Türkoğlu, Kanter 14; Rebs: İlyasova 8 Asts: Tunçeri 6		Pts: Évora 18; Rebs: Évora 18; Asts: Miranda, Minhava 3

Cido Arena, Panevėžys
Attendance: 1,800
Referees: Zoran Sutulovic (MNE), Spyridon Gontas (GRE), Sergiy Zashchuk (UKR)

=== Lithuania vs. Great Britain ===
31 August 2011
21:00

Report

Lithuania	80–69	Great Britain
Scoring by quarter: 19–18, 30–21, 5–18, 26–12
Pts: Kaukėnas 16; Rebs: three players 6 Asts: Kalnietis 5		Pts: Deng 25; Rebs: Deng 10; Asts: Deng 4

Cido Arena, Panevėžys
Attendance: 6,900
Referees: Sreten Radovic (CRO), Robert Vyklicky (CZE), Petar Obradovic (BIH)

== 1 September ==
=== Portugal vs. Spain ===
1 September 2011
15:15

Report

Portugal	73–87	Spain
Scoring by quarter: 16–26, 20–27, 16–24, 21–10
Pts: Tavares 17; Rebs: Andrade 7 Asts: Minhava 5		Pts: P. Gasol 20; Rebs: M. Gasol 9 Asts: Fernández 6

Cido Arena, Panevėžys
Attendance: 1,000
Referees: Robert Vyklicky (CZE), Petar Obradovic (BIH), Miroslav Tomov (BUL)

=== Great Britain vs. Turkey ===
1 September 2011
17:45

Report

Great Britain	61–90	Turkey
Scoring by quarter: 10–22, 16–22, 17–20, 18–26
Pts: Deng 22; Rebs: Deng 8 Asts: van Oostrum 2		Pts: Preldžič 15; Rebs: Aşık 9 Asts: Preldžič, Arslan 6

Cido Arena, Panevėžys
Attendance: 1,100
Referees: Sreten Radovic (CRO), Damir Javor (SLO), Petri Mäntylä (FIN)

=== Poland vs. Lithuania ===
1 September 2011
21:00

BoxScore

Poland	77–97	Lithuania
Scoring by quarter: 20–25, 18–28, 14–23, 25–21
Pts: Kelati 16; Rebs: Lapeta 6 Asts: Koszarek 4		Pts: Kalnietis 19; Rebs: Lavrinovič 9 Asts: Kalnietis 6

Cido Arena, Panevėžys
Attendance: 6,900
Referees: Spyridon Gontas (GRE), Zoran Sutulovic (MNE), Sergey Mikhaylov (RUS)

== 2 September ==
=== Spain vs. Great Britain ===
2 September 2011
15:15

Report

Spain	86–69	Great Britain
Scoring by quarter: 19–16, 19–16, 22–13, 26–24
Pts: P. Gasol 21; Rebs: M. Gasol 11; Asts: M. Gasol 5		Pts: Deng 17; Rebs: Clark 12; Asts: van Oostrum 6

Cido Arena, Panevėžys
Attendance: 550
Referees: Zoran Sutulovic (MNE), Sergey Mikhaylov (RUS), Robert Vyklicky (CZE)

=== Portugal vs. Poland ===
2 September 2011
17:45

BoxScore

Portugal	73–81	Poland
Scoring by quarter: 13–10, 23–19, 13–20, 24–32
Pts: Tavares, Costa 13; Rebs: Andrade 5 Asts: da Silva 4		Pts: Koszarek 18; Rebs: Leończyk 9 Asts: Koszarek 4

Cido Arena, Panevėžys
Attendance: 1,000
Referees: Damir Javor (SLO), Petri Mäntylä (FIN), Miroslav Tomov (BUL)

=== Turkey vs. Lithuania ===
2 September 2011
21:00

Report

Turkey	68–75	Lithuania
Scoring by quarter: 17–19, 18–13, 14–19, 19–24
Pts: İlyasova 20; Rebs: Aşık 13; Asts: Türkoğlu 4		Pts: Songaila 12; Rebs: Javtokas 6 Asts: Jasikevičius 7

Cido Arena, Panevėžys
Attendance: 5,500
Referees: Sreten Radovic (CRO), Spyridon Gontas (GRE), Sergiy Zashchuk (UKR)

== 4 September ==
=== Great Britain vs. Portugal ===
4 September 2011
15:15

Report

Great Britain	85–73	Portugal
Scoring by quarter: 16–16, 28–18, 15–11, 26–28
Pts: Deng 31; Rebs: Deng 10; Asts: Deng 4		Pts: Andrade 24; Rebs: Andrade, Santos 10; Asts: three players 2

Cido Arena, Panevėžys
Attendance: 800
Referees: Spyridon Gontas (GRE), Petar Obradovic (BIH), Sergiy Zashchuk (UKR)

=== Poland vs. Turkey ===
4 September 2011
17:45

BoxScore

Poland	84–83	Turkey
Scoring by quarter: 17–14, 22–21, 22–27, 23–21
Pts: Berisha 21; Rebs: Hrycaniuk 6 Asts: Koszarek 4		Pts: Kanter 19; Rebs: Preldžič 7 Asts: Preldžič 4

Cido Arena, Panevėžys
Attendance: 1,400
Referees: Zoran Sutulovic (MNE), Sergey Mikhaylov (RUS), Miroslav Tomov (BUL)

=== Lithuania vs. Spain ===
4 September 2011
21:00

Report

Lithuania	79–91	Spain
Scoring by quarter: 12–31, 24–31, 23–19, 20–10
Pts: Valančiūnas 13; Rebs: Lavrinovič 8 Asts: five players 3		Pts: Navarro 22; Rebs: Ibaka 9 Asts: five players 4

Cido Arena, Panevėžys
Attendance: 5,684
Referees: Sreten Radovic (CRO), Damir Javor (SLO), Petri Mäntylä (FIN)

== 5 September ==
=== Great Britain vs. Poland ===
5 September 2011
15:15

BoxScore

Great Britain	88–81	Poland
Scoring by quarter: 18–17, 21–14, 16–25, 33–25
Pts: Deng 28; Rebs: Deng 14; Asts: Deng 6		Pts: Berisha 19; Rebs: Hrycaniuk 7 Asts: Koszarek 8

Cido Arena, Panevėžys
Attendance: 800
Referees: Spyridon Gontas (GRE), Robert Vyklicky (CZE), Miroslav Tomov (BUL)

=== Spain vs. Turkey ===
5 September 2011
17:45

Report

Spain	57–65	Turkey
Scoring by quarter: 19–10, 19–25, 17–14, 2–16
Pts: M. Gasol 12; Rebs: Ibaka 8 Asts: Ibaka, Navarro 3		Pts: Preldžič 18; Rebs: İlyasova 11; Asts: Arslan 6

Cido Arena, Panevėžys
Attendance: 3,500
Referees: Sreten Radovic (CRO), Zoran Sutulovic (MNE), Damir Javor (SLO)

=== Portugal vs. Lithuania ===
5 September 2011
21:00

Report

Portugal	69–98	Lithuania
Scoring by quarter: 16–28, 19–13, 15–27, 19–30
Pts: Andrade 16; Rebs: Fonseca, Andrade 5 Asts: da Silva 5		Pts: Pocius, Jasikevičius 14; Rebs: Valančiūnas, Lavrinovič 7 Asts: three players 3

Cido Arena, Panevėžys
Attendance: 5,684
Referees: Sergey Mikhaylov (RUS), Petar Obradovic (BIH), Sergiy Zashchuk (UKR)
