= EuroBasket 2011 Group B =

Group B of the EuroBasket 2011 took place between 31 August and 5 September 2011. The group played all of its games at Šiauliai Arena in Šiauliai, Lithuania.

The group was composed of Italy, Israel, France, Latvia, Germany and current vice-champions Serbia. The three-best ranked teams advanced to the next round.

== Standings ==
Team	Pld	W	L	PF	PA	GA	Pts.
France	5	5	0	438	391	1.120	10
Serbia	5	4	1	432	386	1.119	9
Germany	5	3	2	377	357	1.056	8
Israel	5	2	3	399	448	0.891	7
Italy	5	1	4	380	405	0.938	6
Latvia	5	0	5	385	424	0.908	5

All times are local (UTC+3)

== 31 August ==
=== Serbia vs. Italy ===
31 August 2011
15:15

Report

Serbia	80–68	Italy
Scoring by quarter: 10–18, 25–11, 22–24, 23–15
Pts: Teodosić, Tepić 15; Rebs: Mačvan 8 Asts: Teodosić 8		Pts: Bargnani 22; Rebs: Bargnani 9 Asts: Belinelli 5

Šiauliai Arena, Šiauliai
Attendance: 2,200
Referees: Christos Christodoulou (GRE), Volodymyr Drabikovsky (UKR), Marius Ciulin (ROU)

=== France vs. Latvia ===
31 August 2011
17:45

Report

France	89–78	Latvia
Scoring by quarter: 18–25, 22–16, 23–18, 26–19
Pts: Parker 31; Rebs: Noah 7 Asts: Parker 7		Pts: Blūms 32; Rebs: Šeļakovs 6 Asts: Blūms 6

Šiauliai Arena, Šiauliai
Attendance: 2,400
Referees: Ademir Zurapovic (BIH), Renaud Geller (BEL), Aleksandar Milojevik (MKD)

=== Germany vs. Israel ===
31 August 2011
21:00

Report

Germany	91–64	Israel
Scoring by quarter: 15–14, 25–12, 25–17, 26–21
Pts: Nowitzki 25; Rebs: Kaman 10; Asts: Hamann 4		Pts: Pnini 20; Rebs: Eliyahu 6 Asts: Ohayon 3

Šiauliai Arena, Šiauliai
Attendance: 2,600
Referees: Srdan Dozai (CRO), Apostolos Kalpakas (SWE), Anton Makhlin (RUS)

== 1 September ==
=== Latvia vs. Serbia ===
1 September 2011
15:15

Report

Latvia	77–92	Serbia
Scoring by quarter: 7–23, 26–15, 25–32, 19–22
Pts: Freimanis 19; Rebs: Freimanis 8 Asts: three players 3		Pts: Krstić 23; Rebs: Kešelj 6 Asts: Teodosić 9

Šiauliai Arena, Šiauliai
Attendance: 1,300
Referees: Srdan Dozai (CRO), Marius Ciulin (ROU), David Berekashvili (GEO)

=== Israel vs. France ===
1 September 2011
17:45

Report

Israel	68–85	France
Scoring by quarter: 14–24, 21–18, 13–22, 20–21
Pts: Eliyahu, Halperin 15; Rebs: Burstein, Kadir 4 Asts: Mekel 3		Pts: Parker 21; Rebs: Noah 9 Asts: Parker 8

Šiauliai Arena, Šiauliai
Attendance: 2,100

=== Italy vs. Germany ===
1 September 2011
21:00

Report

Italy	62–76	Germany
Scoring by quarter: 18–16, 12–20, 15–10, 17–30
Pts: Gallinari 17; Rebs: Gallinari 11; Asts: Belinelli 4		Pts: Nowitzki 21; Rebs: Kaman 17; Asts: Schaffartzik 5

Šiauliai Arena, Šiauliai
Attendance: 2,200

== 2 September ==
=== Serbia vs. Israel ===
2 September 2011
15:15

Report

Serbia	89–80	Israel
Scoring by quarter: 22–25, 13–16, 23–23, 31–16
Pts: Savanović 24; Rebs: four players 7 Asts: Teodosić 5		Pts: Halperin 18; Rebs: Kadir 10; Asts: Nissim 9

Šiauliai Arena, Šiauliai
Attendance: 2,500
Referees: Volodymyr Drabikovsky (UKR), Aleksandar Milojevik (MKD), David Berekashvili (GEO)

=== Latvia vs. Italy ===
2 September 2011
17:45

Report

Latvia	62–71	Italy
Scoring by quarter: 21–18, 12–13, 20–24, 9–16
Pts: Kuksiks 19; Rebs: Strēlnieks 8 Asts: Strēlnieks 4		Pts: Bargnani 36; Rebs: Mancinelli, Gallinari 9 Asts: Mancinelli 3

Šiauliai Arena, Šiauliai
Attendance: 4,500
Referees: Christos Christodoulou (GRE), Marius Ciulin (ROU), Anton Makhlin (RUS)

=== France vs. Germany ===
2 September 2011
21:00

Report

France	76–65	Germany
Scoring by quarter: 12–16, 17–12, 29–12, 18–25
Pts: Parker 32; Rebs: Noah 7 Asts: Parker 6		Pts: Nowitzki 20; Rebs: Nowitzki 6 Asts: Hamann, Schaffartzik 3

Šiauliai Arena, Šiauliai
Attendance: 3,000
Referees: Srdan Dozai (CRO), Ademir Zurapovic (BIH), Apostolos Kalpakas (SWE)

== 4 September ==
=== Israel vs. Latvia ===
4 September 2011
15:15

Report

Israel	91–88	Latvia
Scoring by quarter: 23–22, 24–23, 19–22, 25–21
Pts: Eliyahu 26; Rebs: Eliyahu 10; Asts: Mekel 4		Pts: Blūms 27; Rebs: Šeļakovs 9 Asts: Blūms 6

Šiauliai Arena, Šiauliai
Attendance: 3,500
Referees: Ademir Zurapovic (BIH), Anton Makhlin (RUS), David Berekashvili (GEO)

=== Italy vs. France ===
4 September 2011
17:45

Report

Italy	84–91	France
Scoring by quarter: 23–20, 25–21, 19–19, 17–31
Pts: Bargnani 22; Rebs: Bargnani, Gallinari 5 Asts: Hackett 5		Pts: Diaw 21; Rebs: Noah 7 Asts: Parker, Diaw 4

Šiauliai Arena, Šiauliai
Attendance: 4,500
Referees: Srdan Dozai (CRO), Marius Ciulin (ROU), Aleksandar Milojevik (MKD)

=== Germany vs. Serbia ===
4 September 2011
21:00

Report

Germany	64–75	Serbia
Scoring by quarter: 10–17, 18–21, 13–19, 23–18
Pts: Nowitzki 25; Rebs: Kaman 11; Asts: three players 2		Pts: Savanović 18; Rebs: Teodosić, Mačvan 9 Asts: Teodosić 9

Šiauliai Arena, Šiauliai
Attendance: 3,400
Referees: Christos Christodoulou (GRE), Volodymyr Drabikovsky (UKR), Renaud Geller (BEL)

== 5 September ==
=== Israel vs. Italy ===
5 September 2011
15:15

Report

Israel	96–95 (OT)	Italy
Scoring by quarter: 27–26, 22–15, 30–19, 5–24, Overtime: 12–11
Pts: Pnini 22; Rebs: Eliyahu 7 Asts: Halperin 5		Pts: Bargnani 26; Rebs: Bargnani 11; Asts: Hackett 5

Šiauliai Arena, Šiauliai
Attendance: 2,000
Referees: Ademir Zurapovic (BIH), Apostolos Kalpakas (SWE), Anton Makhlin (RUS)

=== Latvia vs. Germany ===
5 September 2011
17:45

Report

Latvia	80–81	Germany
Scoring by quarter: 14–15, 19–18, 15–23, 32–25
Pts: Kuksiks 27; Rebs: Freimanis 7 Asts: Jeromanovs 4		Pts: five players 11; Rebs: Kaman 7 Asts: Schaffartzik 10

Šiauliai Arena, Šiauliai
Attendance: 4,000
Referees: Marius Ciulin (ROU), Aleksandar Milojevik (MKD), David Berekashvili (GEO)

=== Serbia vs. France ===
5 September 2011
21:00

Report

Serbia	96–97 (OT)	France
Scoring by quarter: 25–24, 16–19, 23–19, 16–18, Overtime: 16–17
Pts: Kešelj 25; Rebs: Savanović, Perović 5 Asts: Teodosić 7		Pts: Parker 24; Rebs: Noah 9 Asts: Diaw 5

Šiauliai Arena, Šiauliai
Attendance: 4,000
Referees: Christos Christodoulou (GRE), Srdan Dozai (CRO), Renaud Geller (BEL)
