= Kalnapilio Arena =

Kalnapilis Arena
- Kalnapilis Arena (March, 2023)
- Interactive map of Kalnapilis Arena
- Address: Parko g. 12
- Location: Panevėžys, Lithuania
- Coordinates: 55.73349°N 24.339266°E
- Owner: Panevėžio nekilnojamojo turto valdymo centras
- Capacity: Basketball: 5,656–7,000; Cycling: 3,142; Concerts: 7,000
- Record attendance: 7,013 (Lietkabelis vs Žalgiris; 6 June 2017)

Construction
- Groundbreaking: 2007
- Built: May 2007–October 2008
- Opened: October 24, 2008
- Cost: 108 million LTL
- Architects: UAB "FORMA"; Andrius Bakšys, Elvita Byčiūtė, Saulius Mikšas, Gintas Reisgys, Olegas Tuliakovas, Andrius Zanevičius
- General contractor: PST

Tenant
- BC Lietkabelis

Website
- kalnapilisarena.lt

Kalnapilis Arena, formerly Cido Arena, is the largest multifunctional arena in Panevėžys, Lithuania. It generally hosts track cycling events, as well as basketball games and concerts.

== History ==
The basketball club BC Lietkabelis, which currently competes in the domestic LKL league, uses the facility for all of its LKL home fixtures. It was opened on October 24, 2008. It replaced Sports Palace Aukštaitija as the home of BC Lietkabelis. The arena boasts an indoor 250 m long Olympic cycling track, the only one in the Baltic States.

The arena hosted the FIBA EuroBasket 2011 Group A matches and the European Track Championships. In 2021, it hosted the second stage of inaugural 2021 UCI Track Champions League.

== See also ==
- List of cycling tracks and velodromes
- List of indoor arenas in Lithuania

Preceded by Omnisport Apeldoorn; Apeldoorn	European Track Championships; Venue; 2012	Succeeded by Omnisport Apeldoorn; Apeldoorn
