= 2026–27 FC Barcelona Bàsquet season =

Spanish basketball club season

FC Barcelona
2026–27 season
- FC Barcelona roster in September 2026
- President: Joan Laporta
- Head coach: Aleksander Sekulić
- Arena: Palau Blaugrana
- Supercopa de España: Runners-up
Home	Away	Third
- All statistics correct as of 25 June 2026.

The 2026–27 season is FC Barcelona's 100th in existence, their 61st consecutive season in the top flight of Spanish basketball and 28th consecutive season in the EuroLeague.

In the 2026–27 season, FC Barcelona competed in the Liga ACB, the EuroLeague and the Supercopa.

== Overview ==
=== Pre-season ===
Before the end of the 2025–26 season, coach Xavi Pascual announced he would be leaving the club in the summer. On July 14, the club officially announced Pascual's departure after the activation of his contract's release clause. On July 22, Slovenian coach Aleksander Sekulić was announced as the team's new head coach. On August 7, the club announced Jurica Žuža, Jernej Valentinčič and Marc Estany, the assistant coaches who completed Sekulić's staff with Rafa Martínez and Xavier Beltran remaining in their previous roles.

On July 31, the club announced Barcelona legend Juan Carlos Navarro would be stepping away from his role as sporting director to become an ambassador and mentor for Barcelona's basketball section. On August 3, Xevi Pujol was announced as the club's new sporting director, after previously experiences with Manresa and Baskonia.

As he had announced before the end of the previous season, veteran center Jan Veselý retired from professional basketball during the summer. On June 30, the club announced the departure of several players after the expiration of their contract, including Myles Cale, Miles Norris and Willy Hernangómez. Team captain Tomáš Satoranský was also among the departing players, ending his second spell with Barcelona. Point guard Juani Marcos also left the club after reaching a mutual agreement to terminate his contract. On July 2, the departure of Youssoupha Fall and Nicolás Laprovíttola was announced after the expiration of their contracts. On July 4, the club announced Will Clyburn was also leaving the team after the release clause on the player's contract was triggered. On August 6, the club announced power forward Tornike Shengelia had activated his contract's release clause and would therefore be leaving Barcelona.

On July 12, Finnish power forward Olivier Nkamhoua was announced as the first addition to the squad, signing on a two-season deal. On July 13, American point guard Justin Robinson was announced as the second signing also on a two-season deal. American-born naturalized Slovenian center Josh Nebo was the third addition on July 15, signing until 2029. On July 16, American-born naturalized Bulgarian point guard Umoja Gibson was announced as the summer's fourth addition, signing a two-season deal. On July 17, former academy player Agustín Ubal signed on a three-season deal, returning to Barcelona after leaving in 2024. Nigerian-American swingman Stanley Umude signed a two-season deal on July 21. On July 23, Polish center Aleksander Balcerowski signed on a two-season contract. Tyrese Martin, an American swingman with NBA experience was announced on July 24, signing a one-season contract. British power forward Tosan Evbuomwan was announced after signing a two-season deal on July 27. On August 22, the club announced the signing of French forward Yoan Makoundou on a two-season contract. On September 1, Dominican-American forward Justin Minaya was announced on a two-season contract.

After the major roster overhaul during the off-season, Kevin Punter was named team captain on September 4. He became the second American to ever fulfill the role, after Norman Carmichael in the 1970s.

== Players ==
=== Roster ===
Note: Flags indicate national team eligibility at FIBA-sanctioned events. Players may hold other non-FIBA nationalities not displayed.

FC Barcelona roster
Players
Coaches

Pos.	No.	Nat.	Name	Ht.	Wt.	Age
SG	0	(United States) (Serbia)	Punter, Kevin (injured) (C)	1.93 m (6 ft 4 in)	81 kg (179 lb)	33 – 25 June 1993
PG	1	(Bulgaria)	Gibson, Umoja (injured)	1.83 m (6 ft 0 in)	77 kg (170 lb)	28 – 4 July 1998
G/F	2	(United States)	Martin, Tyrese	1.98 m (6 ft 6 in)	98 kg (216 lb)	27 – 7 March 1999
G/F	3	(United States) (Nigeria)	Umude, Stanley	1.98 m (6 ft 6 in)	95 kg (209 lb)	27 – 12 April 1999
PG	5	(United States)	Robinson, Justin	1.85 m (6 ft 1 in)	84 kg (185 lb)	29 – 12 October 1997
SG	8	(Spain)	Brizuela, Darío	1.88 m (6 ft 2 in)	78 kg (172 lb)	32 – 8 November 1994
PG	9	(France)	Hayes, Killian	1.93 m (6 ft 4 in)	78 kg (172 lb)	25 – 21 July 2001
G/F	10	(Uruguay)	Ubal, Agustín	2.03 m (6 ft 8 in)	88 kg (194 lb)	23 – 19 July 2003
PF	13	(Finland)	Nkamhoua, Olivier	2.03 m (6 ft 8 in)	101 kg (223 lb)	26 – 2 May 2000
PG	17	(Spain)	Núñez, Juan	1.94 m (6 ft 4 in)	86 kg (190 lb)	22 – 4 June 2004
F	20	(United Kingdom)	Evbuomwan, Tosan (injured)	2.05 m (6 ft 9 in)	98 kg (216 lb)	25 – 16 February 2001
C	22	(Poland)	Balcerowski, Olek	2.16 m (7 ft 1 in)	123 kg (271 lb)	26 – 19 November 2000
F	24	(Dominican Republic)	Minaya, Justin	1.96 m (6 ft 5 in)	93 kg (205 lb)	27 – 26 March 1999
C	32	(Slovenia)	Nebo, Josh	2.06 m (6 ft 9 in)	111 kg (245 lb)	29 – 17 July 1997
F	44	(Spain)	Parra, Joel	2.02 m (6 ft 8 in)	88 kg (194 lb)	26 – 4 April 2000
F/C	55	(France)	Makoundou, Yoan (injured)	2.07 m (6 ft 9 in)	102 kg (225 lb)	26 – 9 August 2000

Head coach

- (Basketball Federation of Slovenia) Aleksander Sekulić

Assistant coach(es)

- (Croatian Basketball Federation) Jurica Žuža
- (Basketball Federation of Slovenia) Jernej Valentinčič
- (Spanish Basketball Federation) Marc Estany

Team manager

- (Spanish Basketball Federation) Xevi Pujol

Legend

- (C) Team captain
- (Y) Youth player
- Injured

- Roster
- Transactions

=== Depth chart ===
Pos.	Starting 5	Bench 1	Bench 2	Inactive
C	Josh Nebo	Olek Balcerowski †		Yoan Makoundou (injured)
PF	Joel Parra †	Olivier Nkamhoua		Tosan Evbuomwan (injured)
SF	Tyrese Martin *	Justin Minaya	Stanley Umude
SG	Darío Brizuela †	Agustín Ubal †		Kevin Punter (injured)
PG	Justin Robinson *	Juan Núñez †	Killian Hayes	Umoja Gibson (injured)

Notes: Blue † – homegrown player; (Note: A homegrown player is a player that played for at least three years before the age of 20 on a Spanish team. In Liga ACB, the team must register at least four homegrown players in rosters of 10–12 players or at least three homegrown players in rosters of 8–9 players. In EuroLeague, the team did not have any limitations regarding the number of homegrown players.) Red * – overseas player; (Note: An overseas player is a player from outside EEA, FIBA Europe or ACP states. In Liga ACB, the team may register at most two overseas players. In EuroLeague, the team did not have any limitations regarding the number of overseas players.) Green ‡ – youth player (Note: In Liga ACB, the team may register under-22 players linked to the youth system. In EuroLeague, the team may register under-20 players linked to the youth system.)

=== Roster changes ===
==== In ====
No.	Pos.	Nat.	Name	Moving from		Type	Date	Source
13	PF/C	(Finland)	Olivier Nkamhoua	Pallacanestro Varese	(Italy)	End of contract	12 Jul 2026	
5	PG	(United States)	Justin Robinson	Paris Basketball	(France)	Contract buyout	13 Jul 2026	
32	C	(Slovenia)	Josh Nebo	Olimpia Milano	(Italy)	End of contract	15 Jul 2026	
1	PG	(Bulgaria)	Umoja Gibson	Cedevita Olimpija	(Slovenia)	Contract buyout	16 Jul 2026	
10	G/F	(Uruguay)	Agustín Ubal	Bàsquet Manresa	(Spain)	Contract buyout	17 Jul 2026	
3	G/F	(Nigeria)	Stanley Umude	Austin Spurs	(United States)	End of contract	21 Jul 2026	
22	C	(Poland)	Aleksander Balcerowski	Baloncesto Málaga	(Spain)	Parted ways	23 Jul 2026	
2	G/F	(United States)	Tyrese Martin	Philadelphia 76ers	(United States)	End of contract	24 Jul 2026	
20	F	(United Kingdom)	Tosan Evbuomwan	Greensboro Swarm	(United States)	End of contract	27 Jul 2026	
55	F/C	(France)	Yoan Makoundou	AS Monaco	(France)	End of contract	22 Aug 2026	
24	F	(Dominican Republic)	Justin Minaya	Osceola Magic	(United States)	End of contract	1 Sep 2026	
9	PG	(France)	Killian Hayes	Sacramento Kings	(United States)	End of contract	18 Nov 2026	

==== Out ====
No.	Pos.	Nat.	Name	Moving to		Type	Date	Source
6	C	(Czech Republic)	Jan Veselý			Retirement	30 Jun 2026	
5	PF	(United States)	Miles Norris	Bayern Munich	(Germany)	End of contract	30 Jun 2026	
3	SF	(United States)	Myles Cale	ASVEL Basket	(France)	End of contract	30 Jun 2026	
2	PG	(Argentina)	Juani Marcos	UCAM Murcia	(Spain)	Parted ways	30 Jun 2026	
14	C	(Spain)	Willy Hernangómez	Baloncesto Málaga	(Spain)	End of contract	30 Jun 2026	
13	PG	(Czech Republic)	Tomáš Satoranský	Hapoel Tel Aviv	(Israel)	End of contract	30 Jun 2026	
19	C	(Senegal)	Youssoupha Fall	Nanjing Monkey Kings	(China)	End of contract	2 Jul 2026	
20	G	(Argentina)	Nicolás Laprovíttola	Joventut Badalona	(Spain)	End of contract	2 Jul 2026	
21	SF	(United States)	Will Clyburn	Fenerbahçe	(Turkey)	Contract termination	4 Jul 2026	
23	PF	(Georgia (country))	Tornike Shengelia	Dubai Basketball	(United Arab Emirates)	Contract buyout	6 Aug 2026	

== Pre-season and friendlies ==
=== Friendly matches ===
6 September 2026 VIII Trofeu Encamp	MoraBanc Andorra (Andorran Basketball Federation)	96–101(OT)	(Catalonia) FC Barcelona	Encamp
12:30	Scoring by quarter: 21–26, 27–20, 23–19, 17–23, Overtime: 8–13
	Pts: Bottiroli, Robertson 13; Rebs: Best 8 Asts: Luz 7 PIR: Luz 16	Boxscore	Pts: Martin 16; Rebs: Parra 11; Asts: Gibson 6 PIR: Nkamhoua 22	Arena: Complex Esportiu i Sociocultural d'Encamp; Referees: Zamora, Domingo, Remisa

=== Lliga Catalana de Bàsquet ===
10 September 2026	FC Barcelona (Catalonia)	88–84	(Andorran Basketball Federation) MoraBanc Andorra	Tarragona
21:00	Scoring by quarter: 28–16, 24–21, 17–29, 19–18
	Pts: Brizuela 19; Rebs: Nebo 8 Asts: Gibson 4 PIR: Brizuela 20	Boxscore	Pts: Kuric 21; Rebs: three players 5 Asts: Best 5 PIR: Kuric 24	Arena: Palau d'Esports Catalunya; Referees: Arnau Padrós, Alberto Baena, Andrés Fernández

11 September 2026	Kids&Us Manresa (Catalonia)	77–90	(Catalonia) FC Barcelona	Tarragona
21:00	Scoring by quarter: 18–14, 24–24, 13–24, 22–28
	Pts: Allen 18; Rebs: Allen 6 Asts: Benitez 5 PIR: Allen 18	Boxscore	Pts: Robinson 17; Rebs: Martin 10; Asts: Brizuela 5 PIR: Parra 22	Arena: Palau d'Esports Catalunya; Referees: Jordi Aliaga, Juan de Dios Oyón, Leandro Lezcano

13 September 2026 Final	FC Barcelona (Catalonia)	96–87	(Catalonia) iLERNA Lleida	Tarragona
12:00	Scoring by quarter: 18–23, 22–21, 26–25, 30–18
	Pts: Parra 21; Rebs: Parra 7 Asts: Robinson 7 PIR: Robinson 25	Boxscore	Pts: McGhee 18; Rebs: Perrin 16; Asts: Ejim 4 PIR: Perrin 33	Arena: Palau d'Esports Catalunya; Referees: Òscar Perea, Alberto Baena, Jordi Aliaga

== Competitions ==
=== Overview ===
Competition	First match	Last match	Starting round	Final position	Record							
Competition	First match	Last match	Starting round	Final position	Pld	W	D	L	PF	PA	PD	Win %
Liga ACB	26 September 2026		Round 1		8	6		2	789	744	+45	75.00
EuroLeague	24 September 2026		Round 1		13	8		5	1,149	1,122	+27	61.54
Supercopa	19 September 2026	20 September 2026	Semi-finals	Runners-up	2	1		1	174	187	−13	50.00
Total					23	15	0	8	2,112	2,053	+59	65.22

Last updated: 21 November 2026
Source: Competitions

=== Liga ACB ===
==== League table ====
Pos	Team	Pld	W	L	PF	PA	PD	Qualification or relegation
2	Valencia Basket	8	6	2	805	713	+92	Qualification to playoffs
3	La Laguna Tenerife	8	6	2	697	637	+60	Qualification to playoffs
4	Barça	8	6	2	789	744	+45	Qualification to playoffs
5	Kosner Baskonia	8	5	3	749	688	+61	Qualification to playoffs
6	Río Breogán	8	5	3	838	801	+37	Qualification to playoffs

Updated to match(es) played on 15 November 2026. Source: ACB
Rules for classification: 1) Win–loss record; 2) Head–to–head record; 3) Head–to–head point difference; 4) Point difference; 5) Points scored; 6) Sum of quotients of points scored (Note: Head–to–head record is used only after all the matches between the teams in question have been played)

==== Results summary ====
Overall						Home					Away				
Pld	W	L	PF	PA	PD	W	L	PF	PA	PD	W	L	PF	PA	PD
8	6	2	789	744	+45	5	0	514	442	+72	1	2	275	302	−27

Source: Competitive matches

==== Results by round ====
Round	1	2	3	4	5	6	7	8	9	10	11	12	13	14	15	16	17	18	19	20	21	22	23	24	25	26	27	28	29	30	31	32	33	34
Ground	H	A	H	A	H	A	H	H	A	A	H	A	A	H	A	H	A	H	H	A	H	A	H	A	H	A	A	H	H	A	H	A	A	H
Result	W	L	W	L	W	W	W	W																										
Position	1	4	6	10	7	7	6	4																										

Source: Competitive matches
A = Away; H = Home; W = Win; L = Loss; R = Rest

==== Matches ====
26 September 2026 1	FC Barcelona	119–101	Leyma Coruña	Barcelona
21:00	Scoring by quarter: 22–18, 30–29, 33–32, 34–22
	Pts: Balcerowski 21; Rebs: Balcerowski 6 Asts: Núñez 6 PIR: Balcerowski 30	Boxscore	Pts: Conditt 17; Rebs: Conditt 8 Asts: Verge 9 PIR: Conditt 20	Arena: Palau Blaugrana; Attendance: 3,388; Referees: Luis Miguel Castillo, Alfonso Olivares, Cristóbal Sánchez

4 October 2026 2	UCAM Murcia	100–94	FC Barcelona	Murcia
19:00	Scoring by quarter: 18–18, 28–28, 24–27, 30–21
	Pts: Radebaugh 16; Rebs: Pansa 11; Asts: Marcos 5 PIR: Radebaugh 16	Boxscore	Pts: Punter 18; Rebs: Balcerowski 6 Asts: Robinson 3 PIR: Nkamhoua 19	Arena: Palacio de Deportes; Attendance: 7,211; Referees: Emilio Pérez Pizarro, Joaquín García, Guillermo Ríos

11 October 2026 3	FC Barcelona	89–86	Valencia Basket	Barcelona
19:00	Scoring by quarter: 19–26, 20–14, 29–20, 21–26
	Pts: Punter 13; Rebs: Martin 13; Asts: Robinson 6 PIR: Nebo 17	Boxscore	Pts: Shorts 19; Rebs: Puerto 7 Asts: Taylor 5 PIR: Shorts 22	Arena: Palau Blaugrana; Attendance: 5,342; Referees: Carlos Peruga, Alberto Baena, Andrés Fernández

18 October 2026 4	ASISA Joventut	113–89	FC Barcelona	Badalona
19:00	Scoring by quarter: 23–26, 26–19, 33–23, 31–21
	Pts: Rubio 19; Rebs: Cheatham, Sulejmanović 4 Asts: Laprovíttola 9 PIR: Rubio 25	Boxscore	Pts: Martin 21; Rebs: Martin 6 Asts: Gibson 5 PIR: Martin 23	Arena: Palau Municipal d'Esports; Attendance: 10,248; Referees: Fernando Calatrava, Alberto Sánchez Sixto, Iyán González

24 October 2026 5	FC Barcelona	99–81	Casademont Zaragoza	Barcelona
21:00	Scoring by quarter: 24–21, 24–19, 24–17, 27–24
	Pts: Núñez 23; Rebs: Nebo, Umude 6 Asts: three players 3 PIR: Núñez 22	Boxscore	Pts: Olaseni 18; Rebs: Blumbergs, Brussino 4 Asts: Vives 7 PIR: Brussino 20	Arena: Palau Blaugrana; Attendance: 3,910; Referees: Luis Miguel Castillo, Vicente Martínez, Igor Esteve

1 November 2026 6	Unicaja	89–92	FC Barcelona	Málaga
19:00	Scoring by quarter: 29–25, 25–20, 18–27, 17–20
	Pts: Hunt 16; Rebs: Kravish 8 Asts: Pantzar 4 PIR: Kravish 25	Boxscore	Pts: Parra 17; Rebs: Nkamhoua 7 Asts: Robinson 5 PIR: Parra 17	Arena: Martín Carpena; Attendance: 10,681; Referees: Antonio Conde, Arnau Padrós, Cristóbal Sánchez

8 November 2026 7	FC Barcelona	99–91	Río Breogán	Barcelona
12:00	Scoring by quarter: 23–20, 16–20, 30–30, 30–21
	Pts: Brizuela, Parra 16; Rebs: Martin 10; Asts: Martin 5 PIR: Martin 22	Boxscore	Pts: Brown 15; Rebs: Aranitović, Branković 4 Asts: Bolton 7 PIR: Bolton 20	Arena: Palau Blaugrana; Attendance: 3,875; Referees: Rafael Serrano, Jorge Martínez, Ariadna Chueca

15 November 2026 8	FC Barcelona	108–83	Monbus Obradoiro	Barcelona
17:00	Scoring by quarter: 25–18, 26–22, 22–22, 35–21
	Pts: Martin 22; Rebs: Ubal 6 Asts: Robinson 6 PIR: Martin 23	Boxscore	Pts: Childress, Meindl 15; Rebs: Meindl 9 Asts: Agada 5 PIR: dos Anjos 16	Arena: Palau Blaugrana; Attendance: 3,910; Referees: Fernando Calatrava, Rubén Sánchez Mohedas, Roberto Lucas

22 November 2026 9	La Laguna Tenerife	vs.	FC Barcelona	San Cristóbal de la Laguna
18:00
				Arena: Santiago Martín

6 December 2026 10	FIATC Girona	vs.	FC Barcelona	Girona
12:00
				Arena: Fontajau

8 December 2026 11	FC Barcelona	vs.	iLERNA Lleida	Barcelona
12:00
				Arena: Palau Blaugrana

13 December 2026 12	Recoletas Salud San Pablo Burgos	vs.	FC Barcelona	Burgos
19:00
				Arena: Coliseum Burgos

20 December 2026 13	Surne Bilbao	vs.	FC Barcelona	Bilbao
17:00
				Arena: Bilbao Arena

27 December 2026 14	FC Barcelona	vs.	Real Madrid	Barcelona
21:00
				Arena: Palau Blaugrana

8 January 2027 15	Kids&Us Manresa	vs.	FC Barcelona	Manresa
21:00
				Arena: Nou Congost

3 January 2027 16	FC Barcelona	vs.	Kosner Baskonia	Barcelona
19:00
				Arena: Palau Blaugrana

10 January 2027 17	MoraBanc Andorra	vs.	FC Barcelona	Andorra la Vella
12:30
				Arena: Poliesportiu d'Andorra

17 January 2027 18	FC Barcelona	vs.	Unicaja	Barcelona
19:00
				Arena: Palau Blaugrana

24 January 2027 19	FC Barcelona	vs.	ASISA Joventut	Barcelona
19:00
				Arena: Palau Blaugrana

31 January 2027 20	Casademont Zaragoza	vs.	FC Barcelona	Zaragoza
12:30
				Arena: Príncipe Felipe

7 February 2027 21	FC Barcelona	vs.	La Laguna Tenerife	Barcelona
17:00
				Arena: Palau Blaugrana

14 February 2027 22	iLERNA Lleida	vs.	FC Barcelona	Lleida
17:00
				Arena: Barris Nord

7 March 2027 23	FC Barcelona	vs.	Surne Bilbao	Barcelona
12:00
				Arena: Palau Blaugrana

14 March 2027 24	Río Breogán	vs.	FC Barcelona	Lugo
17:00
				Arena: Pazo dos Deportes

21 March 2027 25	FC Barcelona	vs.	MoraBanc Andorra	Barcelona
17:00
				Arena: Palau Blaugrana

28 March 2027 26	Real Madrid	vs.	FC Barcelona	Madrid
19:00
				Arena: Movistar Arena

4 April 2027 27	Leyma Coruña	vs.	FC Barcelona	A Coruña
12:00
				Arena: Coliseum da Coruña

11 April 2027 28	FC Barcelona	vs.	Recoletas Salud San Pablo Burgos	Barcelona
17:00
				Arena: Palau Blaugrana

18 April 2027 29	FC Barcelona	vs.	UCAM Murcia	Barcelona
19:00
				Arena: Palau Blaugrana

25 April 2027 30	Valencia Basket	vs.	FC Barcelona	Valencia
19:00
				Arena: Roig Arena

2 May 2027 31	FC Barcelona	vs.	Kids&Us Manresa	Barcelona
12:00
				Arena: Palau Blaugrana

8 May 2027 32	Kosner Baskonia	vs.	FC Barcelona	Vitoria-Gasteiz
21:00
				Arena: Buesa Arena

16 May 2027 33	Monbus Obradoiro	vs.	FC Barcelona	Santiago de Compostela
19:00
				Arena: Fontes do Sar

21 May 2027 34	FC Barcelona	vs.	FIATC Girona	Barcelona
				Arena: Palau Blaugrana

=== EuroLeague ===
==== League table ====
Pos	Team	Pld	W	L	PF	PA	PD	Qualification
5	(Turkish Basketball Federation) Fenerbahçe Tarfin	13	8	5	1080	1005	+75	Qualification to playoffs
6	(Basketball Federation of Serbia) Crvena zvezda Meridianbet	13	8	5	1071	1021	+50	Qualification to playoffs
7	(Spanish Basketball Federation) Barcelona	13	8	5	1149	1122	+27	Qualification to play-in
8	(Lithuanian Basketball Federation) Žalgiris	13	8	5	1115	1094	+21	Qualification to play-in
9	(Spanish Basketball Federation) Real Madrid	13	7	6	1227	1152	+75	Qualification to play-in

Updated to match(es) played on 20 November 2026. Source: EuroLeague
Rules for classification: Regular season tiebreakers

==== Results summary ====
Overall						Home					Away				
Pld	W	L	PF	PA	PD	W	L	PF	PA	PD	W	L	PF	PA	PD
13	8	5	1149	1122	+27	3	4	621	617	+4	5	1	528	505	+23

Last updated: 21 November 2026.
Source: Competitive matches

==== Results by round ====
Round	1	2	3	4	5	6	7	8	9	10	11	12	13	14	15	16	17	18	19	20	21	22	23	24	25	26	27	28	29	30	31	32	33	34	35	36	37	38
Ground	H	A	A	H	H	H	A	A	H	A	A	H	H	H	A	A	A	H	A	A	H	H	A	A	H	H	A	A	H	A	H	H	A	A	H	H	A	H
Result	W	L	W	L	W	L	W	W	W	W	W	L	L																									
Position	6	10	6	9	7	10	9	8	8	7	4	6	7																									

Source: Competitive matches
A = Away; H = Home; W = Win; L = Loss; P = Postponed

==== Matches ====
24 September 2026 1	FC Barcelona (Spanish Basketball Federation)	89–82	(Turkish Basketball Federation) Anadolu Efes	Barcelona
20:30	Scoring by quarter: 16–25, 29–19, 18–23, 26–15
	Pts: Brizuela 20; Rebs: Gibson 6 Asts: Parra 3 PIR: Punter 22	Boxscore	Pts: James 22; Rebs: Jones, Šarić 5 Asts: James 5 PIR: Šarić 26	Arena: Palau Blaugrana; Attendance: 5,621; Referees: Saša Pukl, Maxime Boubert, Ioannis Tiganis

29 September 2026 2	Dubai Basketball (United Arab Emirates Basketball Association)	94–87	(Spanish Basketball Federation) FC Barcelona	Dubai
18:00	Scoring by quarter: 23–25, 29–12, 24–25, 18–25
	Pts: Kabengele 21; Rebs: Bacon 7 Asts: Okobo 6 PIR: Kabengele 24	Boxscore	Pts: Punter 25; Rebs: Martin, Punter 5 Asts: Robinson 5 PIR: Punter 28	Arena: Coca-Cola Arena; Attendance: 7,313; Referees: Oļegs Latiševs, Piotr Pastusiak, Gentian Cici

2 October 2026 3	Beşiktaş (Turkish Basketball Federation)	89–95	(Spanish Basketball Federation) FC Barcelona	Istanbul
20:00	Scoring by quarter: 17–25, 23–27, 22–25, 20–18
	Pts: Wilbekin 17; Rebs: Žižić 9 Asts: Morgan 5 PIR: Žižić 18	Boxscore	Pts: Punter 16; Rebs: Martin 5 Asts: Punter 4 PIR: Gibson 20	Arena: Basketball Development Center; Attendance: 8,500; Referees: Borys Ryzhyk, Michele Rossi, Anne Panther

9 October 2026 4	FC Barcelona (Spanish Basketball Federation)	81–88	(Lithuanian Basketball Federation) Žalgiris	Barcelona
20:30	Scoring by quarter: 18–23, 23–16, 24–16, 16–33
	Pts: Robinson 20; Rebs: Nebo 6 Asts: Gibson 3 PIR: Robinson 21	Boxscore	Pts: Edwards 19; Rebs: Valančiūnas 9 Asts: Edwards 7 PIR: Edwards 21	Arena: Palau Blaugrana; Attendance: 4,346; Referees: Milan Nedović, Sašo Petek, Hugues Thépénier

13 October 2026 5	FC Barcelona (Spanish Basketball Federation)	90–87	(Israeli Basketball Association) Maccabi Tel Aviv	Barcelona
20:30	Scoring by quarter: 23–24, 17–18, 27–22, 23–23
	Pts: Punter 19; Rebs: Martin 7 Asts: Brizuela 4 PIR: Punter 21	Boxscore	Pts: Madar 22; Rebs: Theis 5 Asts: Madar, Wallace 4 PIR: Madar 31	Arena: Palau Blaugrana; Attendance: 3,637; Referees: Gytis Vilius, Josip Radojković, Kerem Baki

16 October 2026 6	FC Barcelona (Spanish Basketball Federation)	100–105(OT)	(Hellenic Basketball Federation) Olympiacos Piraeus	Barcelona
20:30	Scoring by quarter: 30–26, 17–31, 19–20, 26–15, Overtime: 8–13
	Pts: Martin, Robinson 17; Rebs: Nebo 10; Asts: Gibson 7 PIR: Nebo, Robinson 22	Boxscore	Pts: Vezenkov 25; Rebs: Jones, Ndiaye 7 Asts: Montero 7 PIR: Vezenkov 38	Arena: Palau Blaugrana; Attendance: 5,394; Referees: Tomislav Hordov, Artūras Šukys, Miloš Koljenšić

22 October 2026 7	Armani Olimpia Milan (Italian Basketball Federation)	81–89	(Spanish Basketball Federation) FC Barcelona	Assago
20:30	Scoring by quarter: 21–23, 19–21, 24–27, 17–18
	Pts: Burnell 15; Rebs: Wright 8 Asts: Cole 5 PIR: Bolmaro, Thompson 15	Boxscore	Pts: Punter 17; Rebs: Martin 7 Asts: Robinson 8 PIR: Gibson 21	Arena: Unipol Forum; Attendance: 6,657; Referees: Saša Pukl, Damir Javor, Jakub Zamojski

27 October 2026 8	Bayern Munich (German Basketball Federation)	84–88	(Spanish Basketball Federation) FC Barcelona	Munich
20:30	Scoring by quarter: 17–21, 25–20, 19–23, 23–24
	Pts: Jokubaitis, Norris 17; Rebs: Wiley 8 Asts: Jokubaitis 7 PIR: Jokubaitis 20	Boxscore	Pts: Punter 23; Rebs: Nebo 9 Asts: Robinson 5 PIR: Punter 23	Arena: BMW Park; Attendance: 11,124; Referees: Milan Nedović, Tomasz Trawicki, Thomas Bissuel

30 October 2026 9	FC Barcelona (Spanish Basketball Federation)	98–94	(Spanish Basketball Federation) Valencia Basket	Barcelona
20:30	Scoring by quarter: 30–25, 14–17, 25–26, 29–26
	Pts: Robinson 22; Rebs: Nebo 10; Asts: Punter 4 PIR: Parra 24	Boxscore	Pts: Brooks 26; Rebs: Sako 10; Asts: Shorts 5 PIR: Brooks 20	Arena: Palau Blaugrana; Attendance: 6,004; Referees: Oļegs Latiševs, Uroš Obrknežević, Denis Hadžić

5 November 2026 10	Hapoel Tel Aviv (Israeli Basketball Association)	90–93	(Spanish Basketball Federation) FC Barcelona	Sofia
19:45	Scoring by quarter: 21–19, 25–27, 18–27, 26–20
	Pts: Bryant 25; Rebs: Oturu 7 Asts: Micić 7 PIR: Bryant 35	Boxscore	Pts: Brizuela 22; Rebs: Nebo 10; Asts: Robinson 6 PIR: Brizuela 19	Arena: Arena Sofia; Attendance: 3,428; Referees: Tomislav Hordov, Gytis Vilius, Luka Kardum

13 November 2026 11	Panathinaikos Athens (Hellenic Basketball Federation)	74–76	(Spanish Basketball Federation) FC Barcelona	Marousi
21:15	Scoring by quarter: 17–17, 16–15, 24–11, 17–33
	Pts: Nunn 19; Rebs: Nunn, Yabusele 6 Asts: Hayes-Davis 6 PIR: Nunn 19	Boxscore	Pts: Robinson 24; Rebs: Nkamhoua 7 Asts: Brizuela, Martin 3 PIR: Robinson 20	Arena: Telekom Center Athens; Attendance: 19,073; Referees: Mehdi Difallah, Damir Javor, Milivoje Jovčić

17 November 2026 12	FC Barcelona (Spanish Basketball Federation)	86–89	(French Federation of Basketball) Paris Basketball	Barcelona
20:30	Scoring by quarter: 20–24, 26–19, 23–25, 17–21
	Pts: Balcerowski 17; Rebs: Nebo 12; Asts: Brizuela 9 PIR: Balcerowski 28	Boxscore	Pts: Hifi 25; Rebs: Johnson 8 Asts: Hifi 8 PIR: Hifi 29	Arena: Palau Blaugrana; Attendance: 5,534; Referees: Saša Pukl, Miloš Koljenšić, Rain Peerandi

20 November 2026 13	FC Barcelona (Spanish Basketball Federation)	100–103(OT)	(Basketball Federation of Serbia) Crvena zvezda	Barcelona
20:30	Scoring by quarter: 23–15, 17–29, 26–24, 19–17, Overtime: 15–18
	Pts: Brizuela 22; Rebs: Minaya, Parra 7 Asts: Robinson 9 PIR: Brizuela 31	Boxscore	Pts: Carter 31; Rebs: Koloko 7 Asts: Butler 6 PIR: Carter 30	Arena: Palau Blaugrana; Attendance: 4,915; Referees: Emin Moğulkoç, Ioannis Foufis, Christian Theis

24 November 2026 14	FC Barcelona (Spanish Basketball Federation)	vs.	(Turkish Basketball Federation) Fenerbahçe Istanbul	Barcelona
21:00
		Boxscore		Arena: Palau Blaugrana

3 December 2026 15	Real Madrid (Spanish Basketball Federation)	vs.	(Spanish Basketball Federation) FC Barcelona	Madrid
20:45
		Boxscore		Arena: Movistar Arena

11 December 2026 16	Partizan (Basketball Federation of Serbia)	vs.	(Spanish Basketball Federation) FC Barcelona	Belgrade
20:45
		Boxscore		Arena: Belgrade Arena

16 December 2026 17	Baskonia (Spanish Basketball Federation)	vs.	(Spanish Basketball Federation) FC Barcelona	Vitoria-Gasteiz
20:30
		Boxscore		Arena: Buesa Arena

18 December 2026 18	FC Barcelona (Spanish Basketball Federation)	vs.	(Italian Basketball Federation) Virtus Bologna	Barcelona
20:45
		Boxscore		Arena: Palau Blaugrana

22 December 2026 19	ASVEL Villeurbanne (French Federation of Basketball)	vs.	(Spanish Basketball Federation) FC Barcelona	Décines-Charpieu
20:00
		Boxscore		Arena: LDLC Arena

30 December 2026 20	Anadolu Efes (Turkish Basketball Federation)	vs.	(Spanish Basketball Federation) FC Barcelona	Istanbul
20:30
		Boxscore		Arena: Basketball Development Center

6 January 2027 21	FC Barcelona (Spanish Basketball Federation)	vs.	(Turkish Basketball Federation) Beşiktaş	Barcelona
20:30
		Boxscore		Arena: Palau Blaugrana

12 January 2027 22	FC Barcelona (Spanish Basketball Federation)	vs.	(Italian Basketball Federation) Armani Olimpia Milan	Barcelona
20:30
		Boxscore		Arena: Palau Blaugrana

15 January 2027 23	Virtus Bologna (Italian Basketball Federation)	vs.	(Spanish Basketball Federation) FC Barcelona	Bologna
20:30
		Boxscore		Arena: Unipol Hall

22 January 2027 24	Crvena zvezda (Basketball Federation of Serbia)	vs.	(Spanish Basketball Federation) FC Barcelona	Belgrade
20:00
		Boxscore		Arena: Belgrade Arena

29 January 2027 25	FC Barcelona (Spanish Basketball Federation)	vs.	(United Arab Emirates Basketball Association) Dubai Basketball	Barcelona
20:30
		Boxscore		Arena: Palau Blaugrana

3 February 2027 26	FC Barcelona (Spanish Basketball Federation)	vs.	(French Federation of Basketball) ASVEL Villeurbanne	Barcelona
20:30
		Boxscore		Arena: Palau Blaugrana

5 February 2027 27	Valencia Basket (Spanish Basketball Federation)	vs.	(Spanish Basketball Federation) FC Barcelona	Valencia
20:45
		Boxscore		Arena: Roig Arena

11 February 2027 28	Maccabi Tel Aviv (Israeli Basketball Association)	vs.	(Spanish Basketball Federation) FC Barcelona	Limassol
20:05
		Boxscore		Arena: Spyros Kyprianou Arena

5 March 2027 29	FC Barcelona (Spanish Basketball Federation)	vs.	(Spanish Basketball Federation) Real Madrid	Barcelona
20:30
		Boxscore		Arena: Palau Blaugrana

9 March 2027 30	Žalgiris (Lithuanian Basketball Federation)	vs.	(Spanish Basketball Federation) FC Barcelona	Kaunas
20:00
		Boxscore		Arena: Žalgirio Arena

12 March 2027 31	FC Barcelona (Spanish Basketball Federation)	vs.	(Spanish Basketball Federation) Baskonia	Barcelona
20:30
		Boxscore		Arena: Palau Blaugrana

19 March 2027 32	FC Barcelona (Spanish Basketball Federation)	vs.	(Israeli Basketball Association) Hapoel Tel Aviv	Barcelona
20:30
		Boxscore		Arena: Palau Blaugrana

24 March 2027 33	Olympiacos Piraeus (Hellenic Basketball Federation)	vs.	(Spanish Basketball Federation) FC Barcelona	Piraeus
21:15
		Boxscore		Arena: Peace and Friendship Stadium

26 March 2027 34	Fenerbahçe Istanbul (Turkish Basketball Federation)	vs.	(Spanish Basketball Federation) FC Barcelona	Istanbul
20:45
		Boxscore		Arena: Ülker Sports and Event Hall

2 April 2027 35	FC Barcelona (Spanish Basketball Federation)	vs.	(Hellenic Basketball Federation) Panathinaikos Athens	Barcelona
20:30
		Boxscore		Arena: Palau Blaugrana

6 April 2027 36	FC Barcelona (Spanish Basketball Federation)	vs.	(German Basketball Federation) Bayern Munich	Barcelona
20:45
		Boxscore		Arena: Palau Blaugrana

8 April 2027 37	Paris Basketball (French Federation of Basketball)	vs.	(Spanish Basketball Federation) FC Barcelona	Paris
20:45
		Boxscore		Arena: Adidas Arena

16 April 2027 38	FC Barcelona (Spanish Basketball Federation)	vs.	(Basketball Federation of Serbia) Partizan	Barcelona
20:30
		Boxscore		Arena: Palau Blaugrana

=== Supercopa de España ===
==== Semifinals ====
19 September 2026	Valencia Basket	86–87	FC Barcelona	Badalona
21:00	Scoring by quarter: 19–24, 21–19, 21–23, 25–21
	Pts: Taylor 23; Rebs: Shorts 6 Asts: Shorts 7 PIR: Shorts 29	Boxscore	Pts: Robinson 17; Rebs: Nkamhoua 12; Asts: Gibson 5 PIR: Nkamhoua 22	Arena: Pavelló Olímpic; Attendance: 8,231; Referees: Carlos Peruga, Óscar Perea, Alfonso Olivares

==== Final ====
20 September 2026	Joventut Badalona	101–87	FC Barcelona	Badalona
19:00	Scoring by quarter: 32–23, 20–23, 19–22, 30–19
	Pts: Laprovíttola 31; Rebs: Sulejmanović 9 Asts: Rubio 8 PIR: Laprovíttola 28	Boxscore	Pts: Parra 24; Rebs: Martin, Umude 5 Asts: Parra, Robinson 3 PIR: Parra 27	Arena: Pavelló Olímpic; Attendance: 12,046; Referees: Antonio Conde, Carlos Peruga, Arnau Padrós

== Individual awards ==
=== Liga ACB ===
Player of the Round

- (Poland) Olek Balcerowski – Round 1
