= Lazdeika the Crab =

Individual rainbow crab

Lazdeika the Crab (Lithuanian: Krabas Lazdeika) is a rainbow crab from Lithuania. The crab was used by Delfi.lt web portal as an oracle to predict the outcomes of each of the Lithuania national basketball team matches in the EuroBasket 2011. The crab has also predicted the outcomes of Lithuania in 2012 FIBA World Olympic Qualifying Tournament and at the 2012 Summer Olympics.

== Methodology ==
During divinations, Lazdeika was presented with two coconut shells, each marked with one of the flags of the competing countries. The coconut Lazdeika chose to shelter in first was considered to be his prediction as to the winner of the game.

== Predictions ==
=== EuroBasket 2011 ===
Teams	Stage	Date	Prediction	Result	Outcome
Lithuania vs Great Britain	Group stage	31 August	Lithuania	80–69	Correct
Poland vs Lithuania	Group stage	1 September	Lithuania	77–97	Correct
Turkey vs Lithuania	Group stage	2 September	Lithuania	68–75	Correct
Lithuania vs Spain	Group stage	4 September	Spain	79–91	Correct
Portugal vs Lithuania	Group stage	5 September	Lithuania	69–98	Correct
Serbia vs Lithuania	Second round	7 September	Lithuania	90–100	Correct
Lithuania vs France	Second round	9 September	France	67–73	Correct
Lithuania vs Germany	Second round	11 September	Lithuania	84–75	Correct
North Macedonia vs Lithuania	Quarterfinals	14 September	Lithuania	67–65	Incorrect
Slovenia vs Lithuania	Classification	15 September	N/A	77–80	—
Lithuania vs Greece	Classification	17 September	N/A	73–69	—
Spain vs France	Final	18 September	France	98–85	Incorrect

=== 2012 FIBA World Olympic Qualifying Tournament ===
Teams	Stage	Date	Prediction	Result	Outcome
Venezuela vs Lithuania	Group stage	3 July	Lithuania	82–100	Correct
Lithuania vs Nigeria	Group stage	4 July	Lithuania	80–86	Incorrect
Lithuania vs Puerto Rico	Quarterfinals	6 July	Lithuania	76–72	Correct
Lithuania vs Dominican Republic	Semifinals	7 July	Lithuania	109–83	Correct

=== 2012 Olympic Basketball Tournament ===
Teams	Stage	Date	Prediction	Result	Outcome
Argentina vs Lithuania	Preliminary round	29 July	Lithuania	102–79	Incorrect
Lithuania vs Nigeria	Preliminary round	31 July	Lithuania	74–55	Correct
France vs Lithuania	Preliminary round	2 August	Lithuania	74–82	Incorrect
Lithuania vs United States	Preliminary round	4 August	USA	94–99	Correct
Tunisia vs Lithuania	Preliminary round	6 August	Lithuania	63–76	Correct
Russia vs Lithuania	Quarterfinals	6 August	Russia	83–74	Correct
