= EuroBasket 2011 knockout stage =

The knockout stage of the EuroBasket 2011 took place between 14 and 18 September 2011. All matches were played at the Žalgiris Arena at Kaunas. The top four teams from both second round groups played a knockout-system to the final.

== Bracket ==
Quarter-finals
14 September
Spain	86
Slovenia	64
14 September
Macedonia	67
Lithuania	65
15 September
France	64
Greece	56
15 September
Russia	77
Serbia	67

Semi-finals
16 September
Spain	92
Macedonia	80
16 September
France	79
Russia	71

Final
18 September
Spain	98
France	85
Third place
18 September
Macedonia	68
Russia	72

5th place bracket

Semi-finals
15 September
Slovenia	77
Lithuania	80
16 September
Greece	87
Serbia	77

Fifth place
17 September
Lithuania	73
Greece	69
Seventh place
17 September
Slovenia	72
Serbia	68

== Quarterfinals ==
=== Spain vs. Slovenia ===
14 September 2011
18:00

Report

Spain	86–64	Slovenia
Scoring by quarter: 16–23, 19–8, 36–14, 15–19
Pts: Navarro 26; Rebs: P. Gasol 16; Asts: four players 3		Pts: G. Dragić 14; Rebs: Begić, G. Dragić 5 Asts: Udrih 3

Žalgiris Arena, Kaunas
Attendance: 11,000
Referees: Christos Christodoulou (GRE), Ilija Belosevic (SRB), Olegs Latisevs (LAT)

=== Macedonia vs. Lithuania ===
14 September 2011
21:00

Report

Macedonia	67–65	Lithuania
Scoring by quarter: 18–20, 12–14, 19–18, 18–13
Pts: McCalebb 23; Rebs: Samardžiski 10; Asts: Ilievski 3		Pts: Javtokas 13; Rebs: Kalnietis 9 Asts: Jasikevičius 5

Žalgiris Arena, Kaunas
Attendance: 15,000
Referees: Luigi Lamonica (ITA), Damir Javor (SLO), Fernando Rocha (POR)

=== France vs. Greece ===
15 September 2011
18:00

Report

France	64–56	Greece
Scoring by quarter: 14–17, 13–14, 13–12, 24–13
Pts: Parker 18; Rebs: Noah 8 Asts: Parker, Diaw 3		Pts: Bourousis 17; Rebs: Bourousis 11; Asts: Zisis 5

Žalgiris Arena, Kaunas
Attendance: 9,000
Referees: Juan Arteaga (ESP), Sreten Radovic (CRO), Petri Mäntylä (FIN)

=== Russia vs. Serbia ===
15 September 2011
21:00

Report

Russia	77–67	Serbia
Scoring by quarter: 16–12, 18–15, 20–21, 23–19
Pts: Kirilenko 14; Rebs: Kirilenko 11; Asts: Kirilenko 6		Pts: Teodosić 20; Rebs: Krstić, Kešelj 5 Asts: Teodosić, Marković 3

Žalgiris Arena, Kaunas
Attendance: 11,500
Referees: Miguel Perez Perez (ESP), Robert Lottermoser (GER), Ademir Zurapovic (BIH)

== Classification 5–8 ==
=== Slovenia vs. Lithuania ===
15 September 2011
15:30

Report

Slovenia	77–80	Lithuania
Scoring by quarter: 20–19, 13–25, 24–19, 20–17
Pts: Lorbek, G. Dragić 16; Rebs: Smodiš 6 Asts: Lakovič, G. Dragić 4		Pts: Kalnietis 17; Rebs: Valančiūnas 6 Asts: Jasikevičius 7

Žalgiris Arena, Kaunas
Attendance: 11,000
Referees: Fabio Facchini (ITA), Srdan Dozai (CRO), Spyridon Gontas (GRE)

=== Greece vs. Serbia ===
16 September 2011
15:00

Report

Greece	87–77	Serbia
Scoring by quarter: 34–8, 14–18, 16–22, 23–29
Pts: Bourousis 27; Rebs: Fotsis, Papanikolaou 8 Asts: Calathes 10		Pts: Kešelj 22; Rebs: Kešelj, Perović, Mačvan 4 Asts: Teodosić 7

Žalgiris Arena, Kaunas
Attendance: 1,500
Referees: Sreten Radovic (CRO), Damir Javor (SLO), Sergey Mikhaylov (RUS)

== Semifinals ==
=== Spain vs. Macedonia ===
16 September 2011
17:30

Report

Spain	92–80	Macedonia
Scoring by quarter: 26–18, 18–27, 27–17, 21–18
Pts: Navarro 35; Rebs: P. Gasol 17; Asts: M. Gasol 5		Pts: McCalebb 25; Rebs: Antić 9 Asts: McCalebb 5

Žalgiris Arena, Kaunas
Attendance: 11,000
Referees: Fabio Facchini (ITA), Srdan Dozai (CRO), Spyridon Gontas (GRE)

=== France vs. Russia ===
16 September 2011
21:00

Report

France	79–71	Russia
Scoring by quarter: 17–16, 22–18, 16–13, 24-24
Pts: Parker 22; Rebs: Noah 8 Asts: Batum 4		Pts: Kirilenko 21; Rebs: Mozgov 4 Asts: Khryapa 5

Žalgiris Arena, Kaunas
Attendance: 14,000
Referees: Luigi Lamonica (ITA), Ilija Belosevic (SRB), Christos Christodoulou (GRE)

== Seventh place game ==
=== Slovenia vs. Serbia ===
17 September 2011
18:00

Report

Slovenia	72–68	Serbia
Scoring by quarter: 27–20, 17–19, 20–12, 8–17
Pts: Dragic 21; Rebs: Begic 9 Asts: Ozbolt 4		Pts: Perovic 13; Rebs: Bjelica 9 Asts: Markovic, Bjelica 5

Žalgiris Arena, Kaunas
Attendance: 5,000
Referees: Srdan Dozai (CRO), Emin Mogulkoc (TUR), Tomas Jasevicius (LTU)

== Fifth place game ==
=== Lithuania vs. Greece ===
17 September 2011
21:00

Report

Lithuania	73–69	Greece
Scoring by quarter: 14–20, 18–17, 24–11, 17–21
Pts: Pocius 13; Rebs: Javtokas 10; Asts: Kalnietis 3		Pts: Calathes 16; Rebs: Fotsis 10; Asts: Calathes 7

Žalgiris Arena, Kaunas
Attendance: 14,000
Referees: Miguel Perez Perez (ESP), David Chambon (FRA), Marius Ciulin (ROU)

== Bronze medal game ==
=== Macedonia vs. Russia ===
18 September 2011
17:30

Report

Macedonia	68–72	Russia
Scoring by quarter: 13–17, 17–19, 20–16, 18–20
Pts: McCalebb 22; Rebs: Antić 5 Asts: Ilievski 4		Pts: Kirilenko 18; Rebs: Monya 8 Asts: Bykov 5

Žalgiris Arena, Kaunas
Attendance: 11,000
Referees: Juan Arteaga (ESP), Christos Christodoulou (GRE), Robert Lottermoser (GER)

== Final ==
=== Spain vs. France ===
18 September 2011
21:00

Report

Spain	98–85	France
Scoring by quarter: 25–20, 25–21, 25–21, 23–23
Pts: Navarro 27; Rebs: P. Gasol 10; Asts: Navarro 5		Pts: Parker 26; Rebs: Noah 8 Asts: Diaw 7

Žalgiris Arena, Kaunas
Attendance: 14,500
Referees: Luigi Lamonica (ITA), Ilija Belosevic (SRB), Sreten Radovic (CRO)
