= EuroBasket 2011 final =

EuroBasket 2011 Final
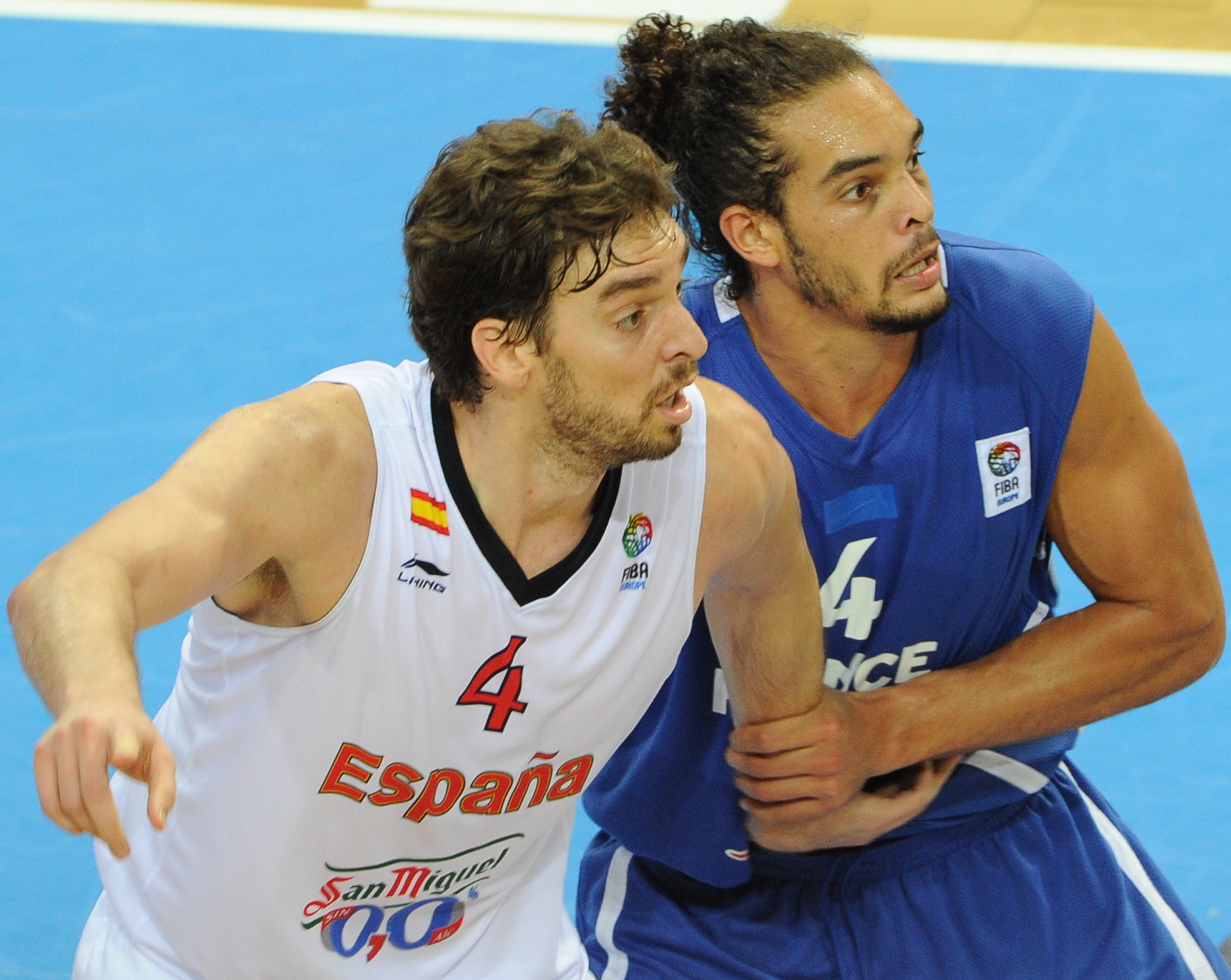
- Pau Gasol and Joakim Noah at the final.
- Event: FIBA EuroBasket 2011
Spain	France
(Spain)	(France)
98	85
	1	2	3	4	Total
Spain	25	25	25	23	98
France	20	21	21	23	85
- Date: 18 September 2011
- Venue: Žalgiris Arena, Kaunas
- Attendance: 14,500

The EuroBasket 2011 final was the championship game of EuroBasket 2011 played at the Žalgiris Arena in Kaunas, Lithuania on 18 September between Spain and France. By virtue of FIBA Europe's two outright berths in the 2012 Summer Olympic basketball tournament, both finalists qualified for the 2012 London Games.

The defending European champions Spain qualified to the final after topping their preliminary round group, winning their second round group, and beating Slovenia and Macedonia in the final round. France, in their first EuroBasket final, also topped their preliminary round group, finished second in their second round group behind Spain, and defeated Greece and Russia in the final round.

The Spanish team retained their European championship with a 98–85 win. Shooting guard Juan Carlos Navarro was named the tournament MVP.

He joined his teammate Pau Gasol and opponent Tony Parker as members of the all-tournament team who played in the final. Macedonia's Bo McCalebb and Russia's Andrei Kirilenko were also named to the team.

== Match details ==
Joakim Noah started the game with two dunks to give the French team an 8–7 lead. José Calderón scored five points to give the Spaniards a 17–12 lead, forcing French coach Vincent Collet to call a timeout. The teams scored on several three-point shots but Spain held a 25–20 lead at the end of the first quarter. Spain stretched the lead to nine in the second quarter but two three-pointers from Mickaël Gelabale and Tony Parker kept the game close. However, Serge Ibaka's third block of the night led to a Pau Gasol basket to pad the Spanish lead to ten. Coming off another timeout, Ibaka blocked two more French shots. Later, Rudy Fernández was called for an unsportsmanlike foul against Tony Parker, whom he pulled down to the floor. This led to a French 7–0 run, capped off by a Nicolas Batum three-pointer and a dunk to cut the lead to five. Spain increased their lead to nine, 50–41, at the end of the first half.

While the French were able to score at the start of the third quarter, Spain managed to maintain the lead within the 10-point margin. France scored five points in a row but Juan Carlos Navarro scored to prevent the lead from decreasing. The Spanish team started the fourth quarter with another run, and they retained the title they had won two years ago in Poland.

Navarro, who scored 27 points in the final and 35 points in the semifinal against Macedonia, was named tournament MVP. Pau Gasol achieved a double-double in the final, scoring 17 points and grabbing 10 rebounds, while Calderón scored 17 points, Fernández had 14, and Gasol's younger brother Marc had 11. Spain's successful title defense was the first since Yugoslavia's 1997 title.

After the game, Prime Minister of Spain José Luis Rodríguez Zapatero congratulated the team, remarking that "discounting the national football team which has just started its brilliant run, I think there is no other team in Spanish sport history that has shone as long as you have."

18 September
21:00

Report

Spain	98–85	France
Scoring by quarter: 25–20, 25–21, 25–21, 23–23
Pts: Navarro 27; Rebs: P. Gasol 10; Asts: Navarro 5		Pts: Parker 26; Rebs: Noah 8 Asts: Diaw 7

Žalgiris Arena, Kaunas
Attendance: 14,500
Referees: Luigi Lamonica (ITA), Ilija Belosevic (SRB), Sreten Radovic (CRO)

== Road to the final ==
Spain	Stage	France
Team / Pld / W / L / PF / PA / GA / Pts. / Tie; Spain / 5 / 4 / 1 / 404 / 364 / 1.109 / 9 / 1–0; Lithuania / 5 / 4 / 1 / 429 / 374 / 1.147 / 9 / 0–1; Turkey / 5 / 3 / 2 / 385 / 333 / 1.156 / 8; Great Britain / 5 / 2 / 3 / 372 / 410 / 0.907 / 7 / 1–0; Poland / 5 / 2 / 3 / 401 / 424 / 0.945 / 7 / 0–1; Portugal / 5 / 0 / 5 / 344 / 430 / 0.800 / 5; Defeated Poland 83–78; Defeated Portugal 87–73; Defeated Great Britain 86–69; Defeated Lithuania 91–79; Defeated by Turkey 57–65	Preliminary round	Team / Pld / W / L / PF / PA / GA / Pts.; France / 5 / 5 / 0 / 438 / 391 / 1.120 / 10; Serbia / 5 / 4 / 1 / 432 / 386 / 1.119 / 9; Germany / 5 / 3 / 2 / 377 / 357 / 1.056 / 8; Israel / 5 / 2 / 3 / 399 / 448 / 0.891 / 7; Italy / 5 / 1 / 4 / 380 / 405 / 0.938 / 6; Latvia / 5 / 0 / 5 / 385 / 424 / 0.908 / 5; Defeated Latvia 89–78; Defeated Israel 85–68; Defeated Germany 76–65; Defeated Italy 91–84; Defeated Serbia 97–96 (OT)
Team / Pld / W / L / PF / PA / GA / Pts. / Tie; Spain / 5 / 4 / 1 / 405 / 340 / 1.191 / 9 / 1–0; France / 5 / 4 / 1 / 383 / 388 / 0.987 / 9 / 0–1; Lithuania / 5 / 3 / 2 / 405 / 397 / 1.020 / 8; Serbia / 5 / 2 / 3 / 388 / 412 / 0.942 / 7; Germany / 5 / 1 / 4 / 345 / 379 / 0.910 / 6 / 1–0; Turkey / 5 / 1 / 4 / 331 / 341 / 0.991 / 6 / 0–1; Defeated Germany 77–68; Defeated Serbia 84–59; Defeated France 96–69	Second round	Team / Pld / W / L / PF / PA / GA / Pts. / Tie; Spain / 5 / 4 / 1 / 405 / 340 / 1.191 / 9 / 1–0; France / 5 / 4 / 1 / 383 / 388 / 0.987 / 9 / 0–1; Lithuania / 5 / 3 / 2 / 405 / 397 / 1.020 / 8; Serbia / 5 / 2 / 3 / 388 / 412 / 0.942 / 7; Germany / 5 / 1 / 4 / 345 / 379 / 0.910 / 6 / 1–0; Turkey / 5 / 1 / 4 / 331 / 341 / 0.991 / 6 / 0–1; Defeated Turkey 68–64; Defeated Lithuania 73–67; Defeated by Spain 96–69
Defeated Slovenia 86–64	Quarterfinals	Defeated Greece 64–56
Defeated Macedonia 92–80	Semifinals	Defeated Russia 79–71

=== Spain ===
The Spanish started their EuroBasket 2011 campaign with a close win against Poland, which cut a 17-point lead to two with 17 seconds left before losing, The Spaniards had an easier win over Portugal, posting a ten-point lead in the first quarter and never trailing thereafter. In their final Group A games, Luol Deng's and Dan Clark's 21 points in the first half were not enough against Spain, which were led by Marc Gasol's in the third quarter, who scored 12 points in that period to deny the British from cutting the gap. The Spaniards secured the top seed in Group A with a blowout win against hosts Lithuania; Spain's 38–12 lead at the end of the first quarter proved to be too much for the Lithuanians. In the preliminary round finale, Turkey won against Spain, who were leading by six points at the end of the third quarter when the Turks had a 16–2 run in the fourth period. Pau Gasol did not play as he injured his ankle in the game against Lithuania.

In their first game in the second round, Spain led by nine against Germany but the Germans ended the quarter with a 12–3 run; Dirk Nowitzki gave the lead to Germany with a jump shot at the start of the fourth quarter. However, Fernando San Emeterio and Rudy Fernandez scored on the next possessions to put Spain back in the lead, but Heiko Schaffartzik and Chris Kaman kept the deficit to three points until Spain made the deciding run of the game, leading 72–65 with two minutes left in the game to put the game away for Germany. In their next game, Spain had an easy win against Serbia; the Spaniards limited Milos Teodosic's productivity, and the outcome was never in doubt when they led by as much as 29 points in the third quarter, despite a last-ditch 13–0 run by the Serbs in the fourth quarter. The win clinched Spain's quarterfinal berth. With qualification secure for both teams, France benched Tony Parker and Joakim Noah in their final second game, while Spain played most of their main players, leading to a blowout win for Spain.

Slovenia led in the first quarter of their quarterfinal game 23–16 when Spain tied the score with a 9–2 run. Spain eventually led 35–31 at halftime and never trailed again at the restart to advance to the semifinals. Spain's semifinal opponent Macedonia started the game leading 7–4, later in the quarter, Pau Gasol was benched for committing two personal fouls. Gasol's replacement, Serge Ibaka had several dunks that led to a Spanish run to end the quarter, capped off by a Sergio Llull three-pointer to put Spain's lead at 26–18. Gasol returned in the second quarter, dunking to give the Spaniards their first double-digit margin when the Macedonians had their own 14–3 run, capped off a three-pointer from Damjan Stojanovski to retake the lead, 32–31; Macedonia retained the one-point lead at halftime. Neither of the teams pulled away early in the third quarter, but Juan Carlos Navarro's three-point shots give Spain a 71–62 margin to prevent the Macedonians from getting close, qualifying for the final anew.

=== France ===
The French opened EuroBasket 2011 trailing 41–40 at halftime against Latvia. The French pulled away early in the third quarter but Jānis Blūms scored on several three-pointers to cut the lead to two points, at 72–70. Nicolas Batum and Mickaël Gelabale converted their own three-point shots to bring back the French lead to eight. In their game against Israel, Tony Parker scored 21 points in a game in which the Israelis made it close when he was on the bench; with France leading 28–14 in the second quarter and Parker on the bench, Lior Eliyahu and Yotam Halperin brought the Israelis within a single-digit advantage when Parker returned. He scored on a lay-up, but David Blu converted on a three-pointer to give Israel the lead. Parker scored on his own three-pointer, and led a 12–0 run after the break to put the game out of reach for the Israelis. In a game where both teams are undefeated, Tony Parker had a game high 32 points, erasing Germany's lead in the first quarter and creating an unassailable French lead; Dirk Nowitzki and Chris Kaman were benched for much of the second half, but Nowitzki returned to cut the lead to ten. That was the closest the Germans would get as Nowitzki finished with a team high 26 points. With Parker sitting out the next game, Italy started the game strong, leading by a point after Steed Tchicamboud and Gelabale each scored a three-pointer. Danilo Gallinari also made a three-pointer, but the French tied the score off two made free-throws from Batum; Gelabale scored on another three-point shot to wrest the lead back for the French. With the Italians taking a one-point lead off Gallinari's split free-throws, Boris Diaw was fouled on the post. Diaw scored on both free-throws, Andrea Bargnani missed on the other end, and Diaw scored on a lay-up to give the French an 85–82 lead with 36 left. After a time out, Gallinari missed on a three-pointer, and when the French rebounded the ball, the game was out of reach for the Italians. On the preliminary round finale that will decide the group winner, the game went into overtime when Parker missed on a three-pointer at the buzzer. In the extension, Marko Keselj converted his seventh three-pointer of the game to give the Serbs a 96–95 lead. Parker made his two free-throws at the other end, and Dusko Savanovic three-pointer was short, to give France the victory.

The Turks trailed in their opening game of the second round against the French 61–48 with 6:33 remaining in the game when they made a 13–2 run, ended by an Ersan İlyasova three-point play to cut the lead to two with 45 seconds left. Parker scored on two free-throws to bring the French lead to four with 18 seconds left when Emir Preldžić made an off-balanced three-pointer to cut the deficit to one, with eight seconds left. The Turks fouled Parker with five seconds left, who made both free-throws. Preldzic, off a Turkish time out, was called for a five-second violation, sealing the game for the French. The French next faced the hosts Lithuania, whom they led at the half by nine points. The Lithuanians then had a 12–2 run at the final six minutes of the third quarter to cut the lead to three. Nando de Colo scored on a three-pointer to give France the two-point lead, and free-throws two minutes later were enough to keep the hosts from retaking the lead. The French suffered their first humiliating defeat of the championship when they were beaten by Spain, 96–69. Noah and Parker sat out in the game; French coach Vincent Collet justified their absences, saying that Noah was advised to sit out due to an issue with his calf, and Parker who was tired from the last couple of games.

Facing the Greeks in the quarterfinals, the French trailed 15–4 after a three-pointer by Antonios Fotsis. The French had a 10–2 run the at rest of the quarter to limit the lead to a single possession. The Greeks extended their lead back to seven, but France tied the game with seven unanswered points. Noah, who had missed his first six attempts, dunked to give France a four-point lead. The Greeks retook the lead at the end of the half, with Ioannis Bourousis getting his own dunk to post a halftime score of 39–32. The French erected a deciding 16–5 run, but while Greece was able to cut the lead to two with two minutes left, the French were able to hold off Greece to score a semifinal appearance.

The French next faced an undefeated Russia in the semifinals. The French had a deciding 8–0 run in the third quarter to deny a repeat of the 2007 final, although Andrei Kirilenko led a Russian run to cut the lead to four, but it wasn't enough as Parker and Batum scored on clutch shots at the final minutes. The win clinched France's first appearance in the EuroBasket final
