= EuroBasket 2007 final =

Sport event

EuroBasket 2007 Final
- Event: EuroBasket 2007
Spain	Russia
(Spain)	(Russia)
59	60
	1	2	3	4	Total
Spain	11	20	15	14	60
Russia	22	12	15	10	59
- Date: 16 September 2007
- Venue: Palacio de Deportes de la Comunidad de Madrid, Madrid
- Referees: Nikolaos Zavlanos; Ilija Belošević; Zoran Šutulović
- Attendance: 15,500

The EuroBasket 2007 Final was the championship game of the EuroBasket 2007 tournament. The game was played on 16 September 2007 at the Palacio de Deportes de la Comunidad de Madrid in Madrid, Spain.

Russia won their first title after the Soviet Union dissolution by defeating Spain 60–59. Naturalized J.R. Holden scored the last basket with only 2.1 seconds left and Pau Gasol missed the last shot at the buzzer. Andrei Kirilenko was named MVP of the tournament.

== Final ==
16 September
21:30

Boxscore

Spain	59–60	Russia
Scoring by quarter: 22–11, 12–20, 15–15, 10–14
Pts: Calderón 15; Rebs: P. Gasol 14; Asts: P. Gasol 3		Pts: Kirilenko 17; Rebs: Khryapa 12; Asts: Khryapa 4

Palacio de Deportes de la Comunidad de Madrid, Madrid
Attendance: 15,500
Referees: Nikolaos Zavlanos (GRE), Ilija Belošević (SRB), Zoran Šutulović (MNE)

Game Statistics

Spain

#	Player	Min played	Pts	FT	2-FG	3-FG	Rebs	Assists
4	Pau Gasol	33	14	5/12	3/12	1/1	14	3
5	Rudy Fernández	24	5	2/2	0/2	1/3	2	1
6	Carlos Cabezas	10	2	-	1/2	0/1	–	1
7	Juan Carlos Navarro	17	–	-	0/3	0/2	–	1
8	José Manuel Calderón	28	15	-	0/2	5/7	4	2
9	Felipe Reyes	21	5	1/2	2/9	–	8	–
10	Carlos Jiménez	28	5	2/4	0/2	1/4	5	2
11	Sergio Rodríguez	2	–	-	–	0/1	–	–
12	Berni Rodríguez	1	–	–	–	–	–	–
13	Marc Gasol	6	5	5/6	0/1	–	–	–
14	Álex Mumbrú	12	–	-	0/1	–	1	–
15	Jorge Garbajosa	18	8	-	1/1	2/5	–	–
	TOTALS (Team)	200	59	15/26	7/35	10/24	43	11

Head coach: (Spain) Pepu Hernández

Russia

#	Player	Min played	Pts	FT	2-FG	3-FG	Rebs	Assists
4	Nikita Shabalkin	–	–	–	–	–	–	–
5	Jon Robert Holden	39	8	-	4/9	0/4	1	1
6	Sergei Bykov	–	–	–	–	–	–	–
7	Andrei Kirilenko	30	17	6/7	4/6	1/4	5	2
8	Nikita Morgunov	9	4	-	2/5	0/1	2	–
9	Petr Samoylenko	16	–	-	0/2	–	2	1
10	Victor Khryapa	35	7	-	2/2	1/6	12	4
11	Zakhar Pashutin	18	3	-	0/2	1/2	3	1
12	Sergei Monia	9	3	-	–	1/2	1	1
13	Anton Ponkrashov	18	8	3/4	1/1	1/1	3	2
14	Aleksey Savrasenko	24	10	2/4	4/8	–	1	1
15	Nikolay Padius	4	–	–	–	–	–	–
	TOTALS (Team)	200	60	11/15	17/35	5/20	38	13

Head coach: (United States) David Blatt

Legend: PTS = points, FT = free-throws (made/attempts), 2-FG = 2-point field goals (made/attempts), 3-PG = 3-point field goals (made/attempts), Rebs = Rebounds
