= Umoja Gibson =

American basketball player (born 1998)

- Gibson with FC Barcelona in 2026

No. 1 – FC Barcelona
- Position: Point guard
- League: Liga ACB; EuroLeague

Personal information
- Born: July 4, 1998 (age 28) Waco, Texas, U.S.
- Listed height: 6 ft 0 in (1.83 m)
- Listed weight: 175 lb (79 kg)

Career information
- High school: University (Waco, Texas)
- College: North Texas (2017–2020); Oklahoma (2020–2022); DePaul (2022–2023)
- NBA draft: 2023: undrafted
- Playing career: 2023–present

Career history
- 2023–2024: Göttingen
- 2024–2025: Spartak Subotica
- 2025–2026: Cedevita Olimpija
- 2026–present: FC Barcelona

Career highlights
- Second-team All-Conference USA (2020)

Umoja Adeyemi Gibson (born July 4, 1998) is an American-born naturalized Bulgarian professional basketball player for FC Barcelona of the Spanish Liga ACB and the EuroLeague. He plays the point guard position.

== College career ==
Gibson began his collegiate career at the University of North Texas, where he played three seasons from 2017 to 2020. He later transferred to the University of Oklahoma, competing for the Sooners from 2020 to 2022. Gibson concluded his college career with the DePaul Blue Demons during the 2022–23 season.

== Professional career ==
After college, Gibson signed his first professional contract with BG Göttingen of the Basketball Bundesliga for the 2023–24 season.

He later joined Spartak Office Shoes of the ABA League during the 2024–25 season.

In June 2025, Gibson signed with Slovenian club Cedevita Olimpija for the 2025–26 season, competing in both the ABA League and the EuroCup. On January 7, 2026, Gibson received a Hoops Agents Player of the Week award after having the game-high 30 points and 5 assists in his team's win. Over the regular season of the 2025-26 EuroCup Gibson led Cedevita in points (16.3) and assists (4.7) per game, and in PIR (17.8).

On July 16, 2026, Gibson signed a two–year deal with FC Barcelona of the Liga ACB and the EuroLeague.

== National team career ==
In June 2026, Gibson received a Bulgarian passport and became eligible to play for the Bulgaria national team ahead of the qualifiers for EuroBasket 2029.

== Career statistics ==
Legend
GP	Games played	GS	Games started	MPG	Minutes per game
FG%	Field goal percentage	3P%	3-point field goal percentage	FT%	Free throw percentage
RPG	Rebounds per game	APG	Assists per game	SPG	Steals per game
BPG	Blocks per game	PPG	Points per game	**Bold**	Career high

=== EuroCup ===
Year	Team	GP	GS	MPG	FG%	3P%	FT%	RPG	APG	SPG	BPG	PPG	PIR
2025–26	Cedevita Olimpija	20	18	24.8	.439	.378	.881	2.2	4.9	1.4	.1	15.9	17.2
Career		20	18	24.8	.439	.378	.881	2.2	4.9	1.4	.1	15.9	17.2

=== College ===
Year	Team	GP	GS	MPG	FG%	3P%	FT%	RPG	APG	SPG	BPG	PPG
2017–18	North Texas	2	2	20.0	.381	.400	.500	**4.0**	2.0	1.5	**.5**	10.5
2018–19	North Texas	33	23	29.0	.400	.393	.800	2.7	1.9	1.4	.1	12.6
2019–20	North Texas	31	31	30.4	.412	.394	.845	2.2	1.9	1.4	.0	14.5
2020–21	Oklahoma	27	15	27.0	.393	.411	.733	3.1	1.2	1.2	.0	9.1
2021–22	Oklahoma	**35**	**35**	32.1	**.435**	.390	**.871**	2.1	1.5	1.3	.0	13.3
2022–23	DePaul	33	33	**34.4**	.424	**.416**	.867	2.8	**4.7**	**1.8**	.2	**15.8**
Career		161	139	30.6	.415	.400	.839	2.6	2.3	1.4	.1	13.2
