= Tyrese Martin =

American basketball player (born 1999)

- Martin with FC Barcelona in 2026

No. 2 – FC Barcelona
- Position: Shooting guard / small forward
- League: Liga ACB; EuroLeague

Personal information
- Born: March 7, 1999 (age 27) Allentown, Pennsylvania, U.S.
- Listed height: 6 ft 7 in (2.01 m)
- Listed weight: 215 lb (98 kg)

Career information
- High school: William Allen (Allentown, Pennsylvania); Massanutten Military Academy (Woodstock, Virginia)
- College: Rhode Island (2018–2020); UConn (2020–2022)
- NBA draft: 2022: 2nd round, 51st overall pick
- Drafted by: Golden State Warriors
- Playing career: 2022–present

Career history
- 2022–2023: Atlanta Hawks
- 2022–2023: →College Park Skyhawks
- 2023–2024: Iowa Wolves
- 2024–2026: Brooklyn Nets
- 2024–2025: →Long Island Nets
- 2026: Philadelphia 76ers
- 2026: →Delaware Blue Coats
- 2026–present: FC Barcelona
- Stats at NBA.com
- Stats at Basketball Reference

Tyrese Jeffrey Martin (born March 7, 1999) is an American professional basketball player for FC Barcelona of the Liga ACB and the EuroLeague. He played college basketball for the Rhode Island Rams and the UConn Huskies.

== Early life and education ==
Martin was born on March 7, 1999, in Allentown, Pennsylvania.

=== High school career ===
Martin played basketball for William Allen High School in Allentown. As a senior, he averaged 21.3 points and 11.4 rebounds per game. He was named Eastern Pennsylvania Conference (EPC) MVP, and led Allen High School to its first EPC title since 2006.

He played a postgraduate season at Massanutten Military Academy in Woodstock, Virginia, to gain more exposure from college programs.

In 2017, he committed to playing college basketball for Rhode Island over offers from Minnesota, Utah and Seton Hall, and others.

=== College career ===
As a freshman at Rhode Island, Martin averaged 8.1 points and 5.2 rebounds per game. On February 26, 2020, he posted season highs of 24 points and 16 rebounds in a 76–75 win against Fordham. Martin averaged 12.8 points and 7 rebounds per game as a sophomore.

For his junior season, he transferred to UConn to play under head coach Dan Hurley, who had recruited him to Rhode Island. During the offseason, he worked a full-time job at a warehouse in Allentown after his mother was laid off from her job during the COVID-19 pandemic.

Martin was granted a waiver from the NCAA for immediate eligibility at UConn. However, he was suspended by the NCAA for the season opener against Central Connecticut for playing in an unsanctioned summer league game.

As a junior, Martin averaged 10.3 points and 7.5 rebounds per game. On December 1, 2021, he was ruled out after spraining his wrist several games previously. On December 21, 2021, Martin scored a career-high 25 points and passed the 1,000-point mark in a 78–70 win over Marquette.

On March 22, 2022, Martin declared for the 2022 NBA draft, forgoing his remaining college eligibility.

== Professional career ==
=== Atlanta Hawks / College Park Skyhawks (2022–2023) ===
Martin was drafted by the Golden State Warriors with the 51st overall selection in the 2022 NBA draft and was subsequently traded to the Atlanta Hawks. On July 16, 2022, he signed a multi-year contract with the Hawks. In the 2022–23 season, Martin played 16 games for the Hawks, averaging 1.3 points in 4.1 minutes per game, and also played 30 games for the College Park Skyhawks, averaging 18.1 points, 8.9 rebounds, and 1.7 assists in 33.0 minutes per game. On July 21, 2023, he was waived by the Hawks.

=== Iowa Wolves (2023–2024) ===
On September 28, 2023, Martin signed with the Minnesota Timberwolves, but was waived on October 20. Nine days later, he joined the Iowa Wolves, the Timberwolves' NBA G League affiliate.

=== Brooklyn Nets (2024–2026) ===
On September 20, 2024, Martin signed with the Brooklyn Nets and on October 19, his training camp deal was converted into a two-way contract. On November 27, Martin scored a career-high 30 points in a 127-117 win over the Phoenix Suns. He was 10-13 from the field and made a career-high eight threes. Martin also set a franchise record for points in a game by a player on a two-way contract. On February 19, 2025, Martin’s two-way contract was converted into a standard contract. He made 60 total appearances (including 11 starts) for Brooklyn during the 2024–25 NBA season, averaging 8.7 points, 3.7 rebounds, and 2.0 assists.

Martin played in 37 games (starting six) for the Nets during the 2025–26 season, recording averages of 7.3 points, 2.9 rebounds, and 1.9 assists. On February 5, 2026, the Nets waived Martin.

=== Philadelphia 76ers (2026) ===
On February 19, 2026, Martin signed a two-way contract with the Philadelphia 76ers, splitting time with their NBA G League affiliate, the Delaware Blue Coats. Martin made nine appearances for Philadelphia, averaging 2.2 points, 1.1 rebounds, and 1.0 assists.

=== FC Barcelona (2026–present) ===
On July 24, 2026, Martin signed with FC Barcelona of the Liga ACB and the EuroLeague on a one-season contract.

== Career statistics ==
Legend
GP	Games played	GS	Games started	MPG	Minutes per game
FG%	Field goal percentage	3P%	3-point field goal percentage	FT%	Free throw percentage
RPG	Rebounds per game	APG	Assists per game	SPG	Steals per game
BPG	Blocks per game	PPG	Points per game	**Bold**	Career high

=== NBA ===
Year	Team	GP	GS	MPG	FG%	3P%	FT%	RPG	APG	SPG	BPG	PPG
2022–23	Atlanta	16	0	4.1	.391	.143	**1.000**	.8	.1	.1	.0	1.3
2024–25	Brooklyn	**60**	**11**	**21.9**	.406	**.351**	.793	**3.7**	**2.0**	**.6**	**.2**	**8.7**
2025–26	Brooklyn	37	6	18.8	.392	.336	.731	2.9	1.9	**.6**	.1	7.3
2025–26	Philadelphia	9	0	9.0	**.409**	.154	.000	1.1	1.0	.3	**.2**	2.2
Career		122	17	17.7	.401	.337	.761	2.8	1.7	.5	.1	6.8

=== College ===
Year	Team	GP	GS	MPG	FG%	3P%	FT%	RPG	APG	SPG	BPG	PPG
2018–19	Rhode Island	**33**	19	27.0	.418	.311	.648	5.2	1.0	.8	.3	8.1
2019–20	Rhode Island	30	**30**	**34.2**	.433	.321	.662	7.0	1.1	**1.1**	.3	12.8
2020–21	UConn	22	21	30.1	.440	.320	.672	**7.5**	1.0	1.0	**.5**	10.3
2021–22	UConn	29	29	32.1	**.449**	**.430**	**.689**	**7.5**	**1.9**	.8	**.5**	**13.6**
Career		114	99	30.8	.435	.346	.670	6.7	1.3	.9	.4	11.1
