= Xevi Pujol =

Spanish basketball coach and executive

- Pujol with Baskonia in 2026

FC Barcelona
- Position: General manager
- League: Liga ACB; EuroLeague

Personal information
- Born: March 17, 1990 (age 36) Manresa, Catalonia

Career history

Coaching
- 2014–2020: Manresa (assistant coach)
- 2020–2025: Manresa (general manager)
- 2025–2026: Baskonia (general manager)
- 2026–present: FC Barcelona (general manager)

Career highlights
- As general manager: Spanish Cup winner (2026)

Xavier Pujol i Estela, commonly known as Xevi Pujol (born March 17, 1990) is a professional basketball coach and executive who is the current general manager of FC Barcelona of the Liga ACB and the EuroLeague.

== Early life ==
Born in Manresa, Catalonia, Pujol played basketball in the youth ranks of his hometown's team, Bàsquet Manresa. Eventually coaching junior teams himself, Pujol had his first senior coaching experience as an intern for the staff of Jaume Ponsarnau, who served as head coach of Manresa.

== Professional career ==
=== Manresa (2014–2025) ===
In 2014, Pujol officially joined the staff of Pedro Martínez as an assistant coach for Manresa. Over the next six seasons, Pujol remained as an assistant coach as Manresa played in both the Liga ACB and the LEB Oro. In his time in Manresa's staff, he worked under several coaches, including Ibon Navarro, Diego Ocampo, Joan Peñarroya and once again Pedro Martínez.

After nine seasons in coaching roles, Pujol became Manresa's general manager in May 2020. During his tenure as Manresa's director, Pujol signed future EuroLeague stars like Brancou Badio, Sylvain Francisco or Chima Moneke among others. In June 2025, Pujol parted ways with Manresa after more than 25 years with the club.

=== Baskonia (2025–2026) ===
On June 13, 2025, Baskonia of the Liga ACB and the EuroLeague announced Pujol as the team's new general manager, signing a three-season deal. Despite finding success with Baskonia winning the 2026 Spanish Cup, Pujol and the Basques parted ways in August 2026.

=== Barcelona (2026–present) ===
On August 3, 2026, Pujol was announced as the new general manager for FC Barcelona of the Liga ACB and the EuroLeague. Signing a three-season contract, Pujol replaced former player and Barcelona legend Juan Carlos Navarro.
