= Juan Carlos Navarro (basketball) =

Spanish basketball player (born 1980)

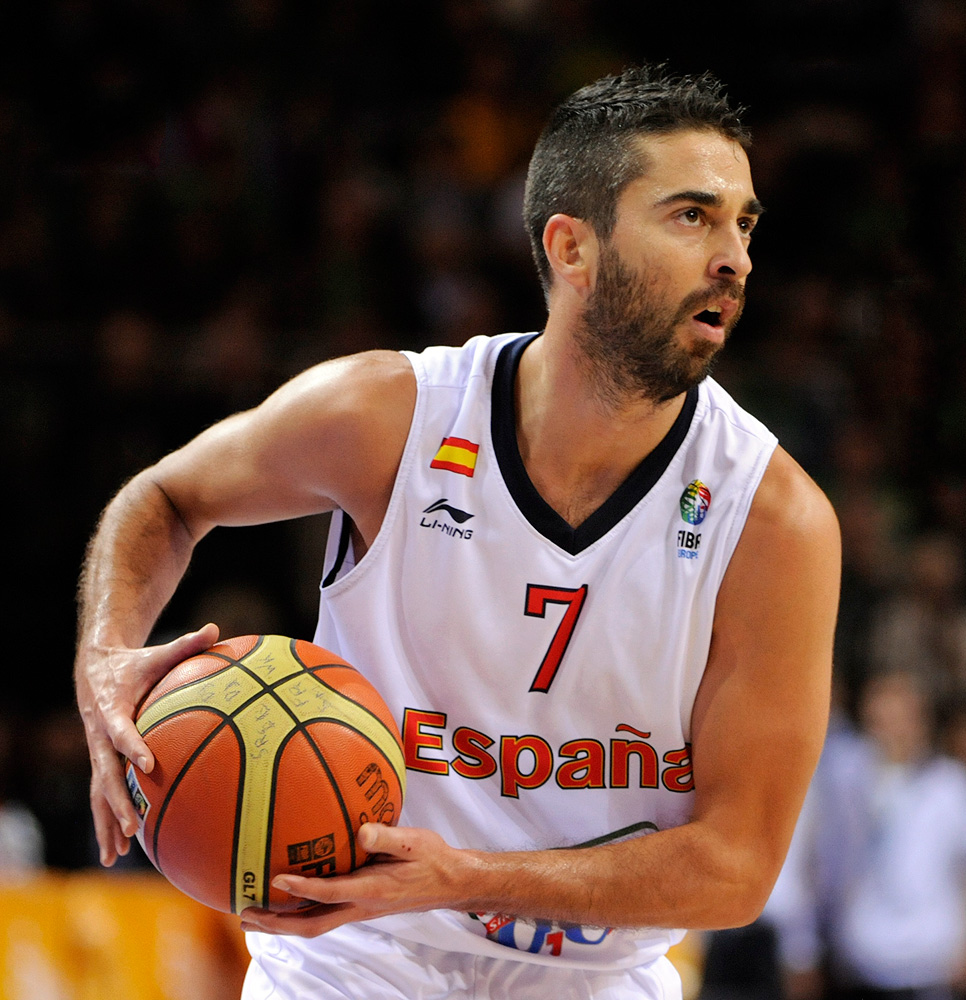
- Navarro with the Spain national team in 2011

FC Barcelona
- League: Liga ACB; EuroLeague

Personal information
- Born: June 13, 1980 (age 46) Sant Feliu de Llobregat, Spain
- Listed height: 6 ft 4 in (1.93 m)
- Listed weight: 201 lb (91 kg)

Career information
- NBA draft: 2002: 2nd round, 40th overall pick
- Drafted by: Washington Wizards
- Playing career: 1997–2018
- Position: Shooting guard
- Number: 11, 2

Career history
- 1997–2007: FC Barcelona
- 2007–2008: Memphis Grizzlies
- 2008–2018: FC Barcelona

Career highlights
- As a player: NBA All-Rookie Second Team (2008); Mister Europa Player of the Year (2010); EuroBasket MVP (2011); 2× EuroLeague champion (2003, 2010); EuroLeague MVP (2009); EuroLeague Final Four MVP (2010); 5× All-EuroLeague First Team (2006, 2007, 2009–2011); 2× All-EuroLeague Second Team (2012, 2013); EuroLeague Top Scorer (2007); EuroLeague 2000–2010 All-Decade Team (2010); EuroLeague 2010–2020 All-Decade Team (2020); EuroLeague 25th Anniversary Team (2025); EuroLeague Legend (2014); 101 Greats of European Basketball (2018); FIBA Korać Cup champion (1999); Spanish Sportsman of the Year (2011); 8× Liga ACB champion (1999, 2001, 2003, 2004, 2009, 2011, 2012, 2014); 7× Spanish Cup winner (2001, 2003, 2007, 2010, 2011, 2013, 2018); 5× Spanish Supercup winner (2004, 2009–2011, 2015); Liga ACB MVP (2006); 3× Liga ACB Finals MVP (2009, 2011, 2014); 4× All-Liga ACB First Team (2006, 2007, 2009, 2010); Liga ACB Top Scorer (2007); 3× Spanish Supercup MVP (2009–2011); No. 11 retired by FC Barcelona (2019)
- Stats at NBA.com
- Stats at Basketball Reference
Medals
Men's basketball
Representing Spain
Summer Olympic Games
Silver medal – second place	2008 Beijing
Silver medal – second place	2012 London
Bronze medal – third place	2016 Rio de Janeiro
FIBA World Cup
Gold medal – first place	2006 Japan
FIBA EuroBasket
Gold medal – first place	2009 Poland
Gold medal – first place	2011 Lithuania
Silver medal – second place	2003 Sweden
Silver medal – second place	2007 Spain
Bronze medal – third place	2001 Turkey
Bronze medal – third place	2017 Finland–Israel–Romania–Turkey
FIBA U19 World Cup
Gold medal – first place	1999 Portugal	U19 Team
FIBA U18 EuroBasket
Gold medal – first place	1998 Bulgaria	U18 Team

Juan Carlos Navarro Feijoo, commonly known as either Juan Carlos Navarro or J. C. Navarro (born June 13, 1980), is a Spanish former professional basketball player and current basketball executive. He currently a club ambassador and player mentor of the Spanish EuroLeague club FC Barcelona Bàsquet. During his playing career, at a height of 6 ft 4 in (1.93 m) tall, he played at the shooting guard position. During his playing days, Navarro was nicknamed "La Bomba" (English: "The Bomb"), which is also the Spanish name for his signature basketball move, the tear drop, which was the shot Navarro was a specialist in and became well-known for.

Navarro is widely regarded as one of the best European basketball players of all time. Navarro was the Eurobasket News All-Europe Player of the Year in 2009, 2010, and 2011. He was also named Mr. Europa in 2010. On March 14, 2014, Navarro was inducted into the Euroleague's Hall of Fame, after he was named a EuroLeague Legend. In 2018, he was named to the 101 Greats of European Basketball selection. Along with the Greek player Vassilis Spanoulis, Navarro was one of just two players, that were still active players at the time, that were specially selected for the honor. All of the other players that were chosen for the honor, had already retired from actively playing.

During his pro club career, Navarro was a two-time EuroLeague champion, in 2003 and 2010. He was also named the EuroLeague MVP in 2009, the EuroLeague Final Four MVP in 2010, and he was also selected as a member of the EuroLeague 2000–2010 All-Decade Team and the EuroLeague 2010–2020 All-Decade Team. As the captain of the senior national team of Spain, Navarro notably won, among other medals, a FIBA World Cup gold medal in 2006, two FIBA Summer Olympics silver medals in 2008 and 2012, as well as two FIBA EuroBasket gold medals in 2009 and 2011. He also earned two All-EuroBasket Team selections (2005, 2011), and was the competition's MVP in 2011.

== Early life ==
Juan Carlos Navarro Feijoo was born in Sant Feliu de Llobregat, Barcelona, Spain. Navarro began playing youth system club basketball, with a local club in Sant Feliu de Llobregat, called Club Bàsquet Santfeliuenc, at the age of 8. At the age of 12, he moved to the youth clubs of FC Barcelona.

== Professional career ==
=== FC Barcelona (1997–2008) ===
Navarro started playing with the senior men's club of FC Barcelona at the age of 17, making his Spanish ACB League debut on November 23, 1997. That year he was selected to attend the Nike Hoop Summit, but he opted stayed in Europe, and play for the Barcelona pro team. Due to his club obligations, he was also not on the Spanish junior national team that won the Albert Schweitzer Tournament, in Mannheim, in 1998.

With the acquisitions of Dejan Bodiroga and Gregor Fučka in 2003, FC Barcelona won all the competitions they played in that year. It was the first time the club won the EuroLeague championship. By winning the Spanish ACB League, the Spanish King's Cup, and the 2002–03 EuroLeague all in the same year, Barcelona won the coveted Triple Crown championship that year.

With Barcelona, Navarro played on Liga ACB (Spanish League) championship teams eight times: 1999, 2001, 2003, 2004, 2009, 2011, 2012 and 2014; the Spanish King's Cup winners seven times: 2001, 2003, 2007, 2010, 2011, 2013 and 2018; the Spanish Supercup winners five times: 2004, 2009, 2010, 2011 and 2015; the FIBA Korać Cup champions once: 1999; and the EuroLeague champions twice: 2003 and 2010. Navarro helped Barcelona reach the EuroLeague Final Four seven times: 2000, 2003, 2006, 2009, 2010, 2012, and 2014. Navarro was selected to the All-EuroLeague Team seven times: 2006, 2007, 2009, 2010, 2011, 2012 and 2013. In 2006, Juan Carlos Navarro earned the regular season Most Valuable Player award of the Spanish Liga ACB. He was named the Spanish Liga ACB Finals Most Valuable Player in 2009 and 2011. He was named the EuroLeague MVP in 2009, and the EuroLeague Final Four MVP in 2010

As a member of FC Barcelona, Navarro played with players like Sasha Đjorđjević, Artūras Karnišovas, Rony Seikaly, Pau Gasol, and Šarūnas Jasikevičius, which helped make him a better player, and he became one of the most promising young European players, early on in his career with Barcelona. Several NBA mock drafts started to set him as a projected NBA draft pick.

In the 2001–02 season, Navarro was plagued by injuries, which dropped his NBA draft stock. Eventually, the Washington Wizards drafted Navarro in the second round (with the 40th pick overall) of the 2002 NBA draft. Navarro subsequently declined the Wizards contract offer, as he preferred to stay with Barcelona.

On August 3, 2007, the Washington Wizards traded Navarro's draft rights to the Memphis Grizzlies in exchange for a future first-round draft pick. Navarro would later be reunited with his former Barcelona and Spain national teammate Pau Gasol on the Grizzlies. After securing his €10 million contract buyout with Barcelona, Navarro signed a one-year contract with the Memphis Grizzlies of the NBA, and he played with them during the 2007–08 season.

In his rookie NBA season, Navarro was one of the Grizzlies' team leaders in three-point shooting (.361). He was also named to the 2007–08 NBA All-Rookie Second Team after averaging 10.9 points per game. On June 18, 2008, he decided to leave the NBA and return to Spain. He signed a four-year deal worth €12 million net income (with an optional fifth year that would bring the total contract to €15 million net income) with Barcelona, his former team. A qualifying contract offer, that had been previously tendered to Navarro by the Memphis Grizzlies, was eventually rescinded by the team on September 10, 2009. That allowed the Grizzlies the cap space to then sign Allen Iverson.

Navarro's final NBA game was played on April 16, 2008, in a 111–120 loss to the Denver Nuggets where he recorded 16 points, 7 assists, 4 rebounds and 2 steals.

=== FC Barcelona (2008–2018) ===
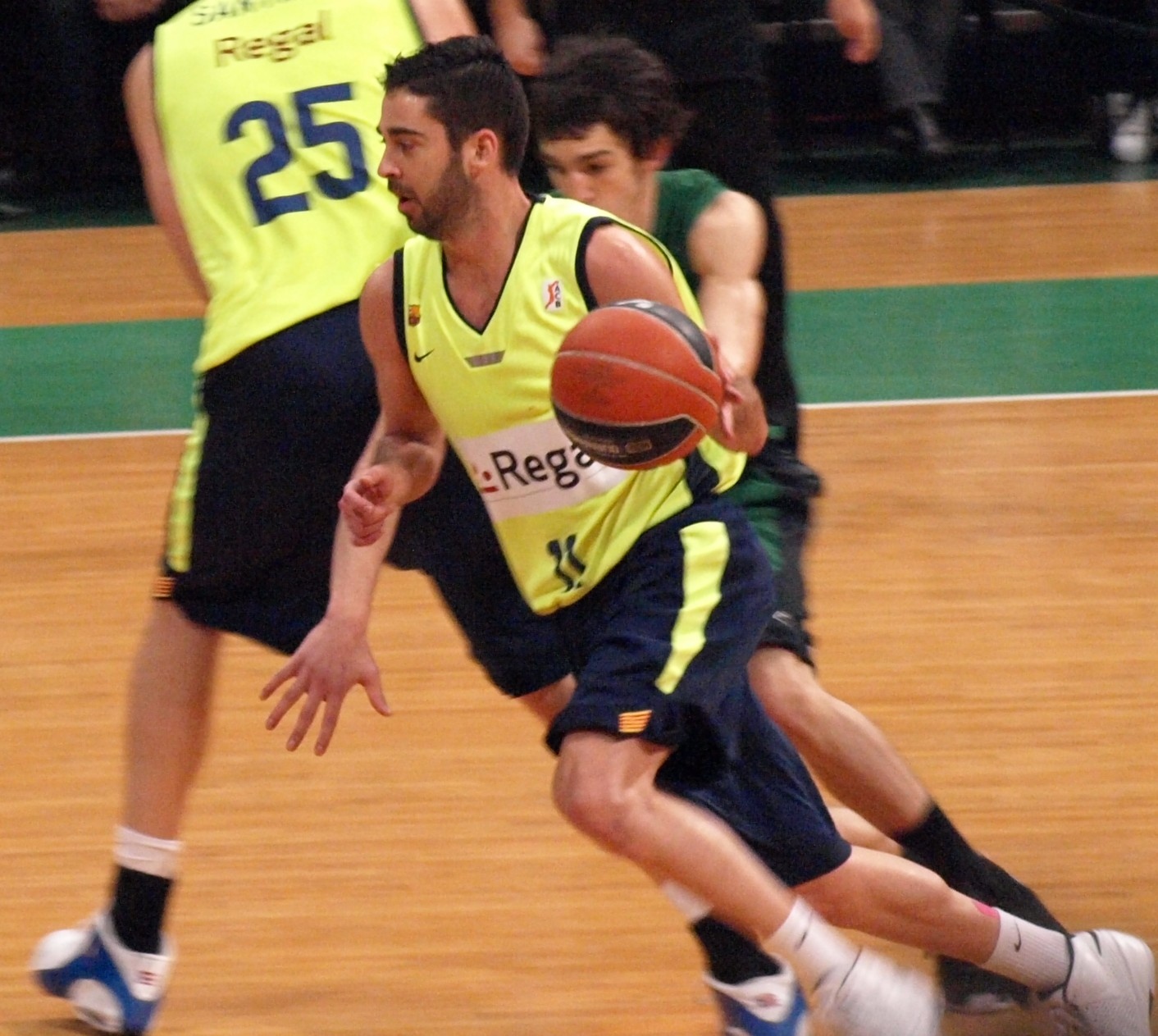
Navarro with FC Barcelona, getting past Joventut's Pau Ribas, after a screen performed by Daniel Santiago (2009).

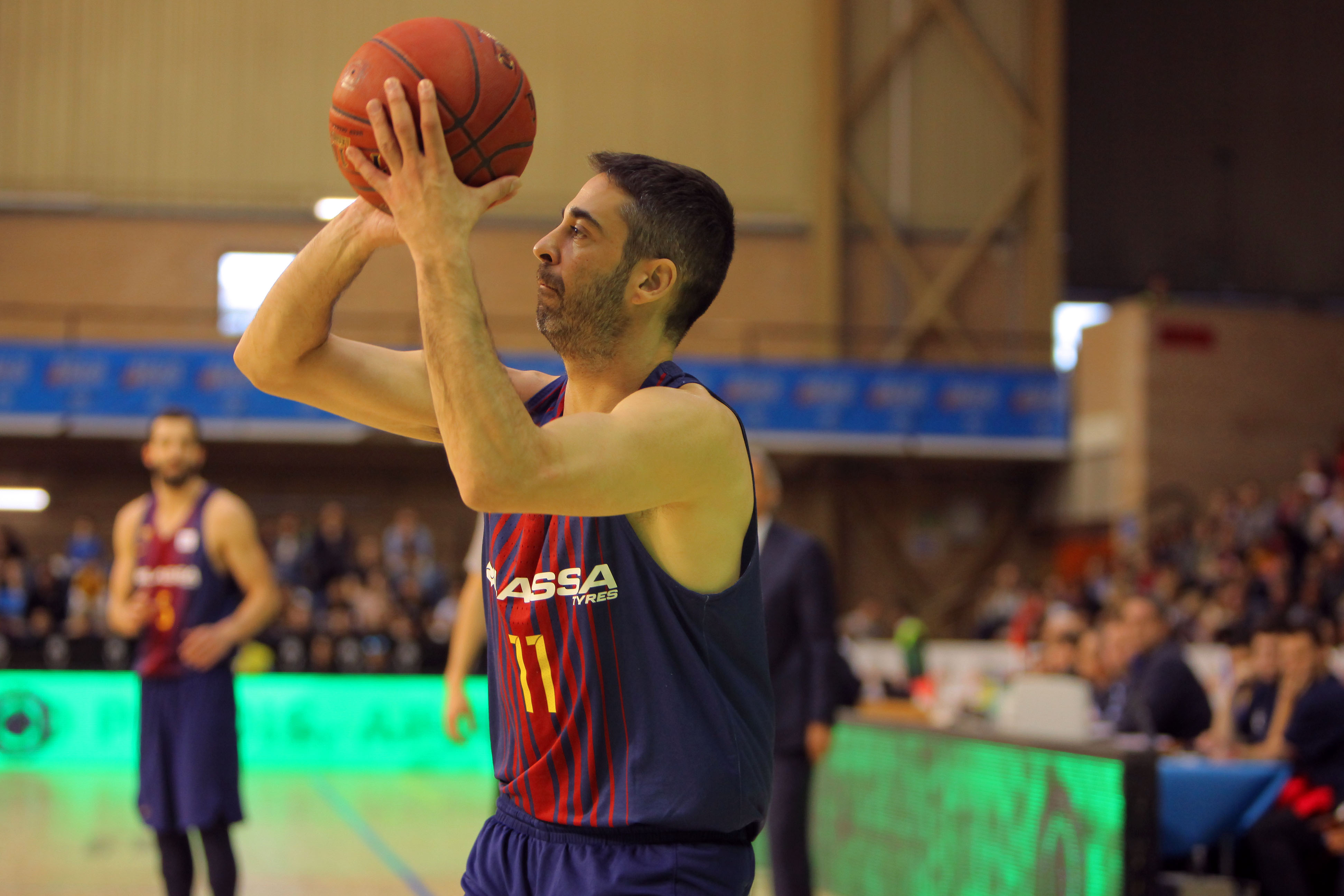
Navarro with FC Barcelona (2017).

After spending the 2007–08 season in the NBA, with the Memphis Grizzlies, Navarro returned to FC Barcelona in the summer of 2008, on a 4-year €12 million net income contract. The contract included a €10 million buyout amount. The contract also included an optional fifth year, which brought the total contract to €15 million net income. In 2012, Barcelona picked up the fifth optional year of his contract (€3 million net income), and extended him for another two additional years, at a salary of €2.6 million per season after that, bringing the total to €8.2 million net income over three years.

Over the 2014–15 season, Navarro experienced several injury problems with his right leg. In late December 2014, it was announced that he would miss up to six weeks of action, due to a torn muscle in his right thigh. On June 29, 2015, it was announced by Barcelona that Navarro would miss three months of game action, due to plantar fasciitis on his right foot. Those injuries negatively impacted his performances over the season, in which he had averages of 10.5 points and 3.1 assists per game, on 37% shooting from the field overall, in 17 EuroLeague 2014–15 season games.

On August 17, 2018, Navarro retired from competing in active sports competition, and he joined the FC Barcelona club's head office structure. That fulfilled what had been previously established in the 10-year contract that he signed with the club in September 2017 - that he would join the club's front office, after he retired from playing basketball with the team.

At the time of his retirement from playing professional basketball, Navarro was the EuroLeague's all-time career leader in total Performance Index Rating (PIR) (that record was eventually broken by Vassilis Spanoulis), and also the league's career leader in total points scored (4,152 points) in the modern EuroLeague Basketball era of the competition, since the year 2000 (that record was also eventually broken by Spanoulis). Navarro also retired as the all-time career leader in total points scored (4,321 points), in the entire history of the EuroLeague (since 1958), including when the competition was run by FIBA Europe, as he also scored 169 total points in the FIBA EuroLeague 1999–00 season. In March 2019, Navarro's number 11 jersey was retired by the club.

== National team career ==
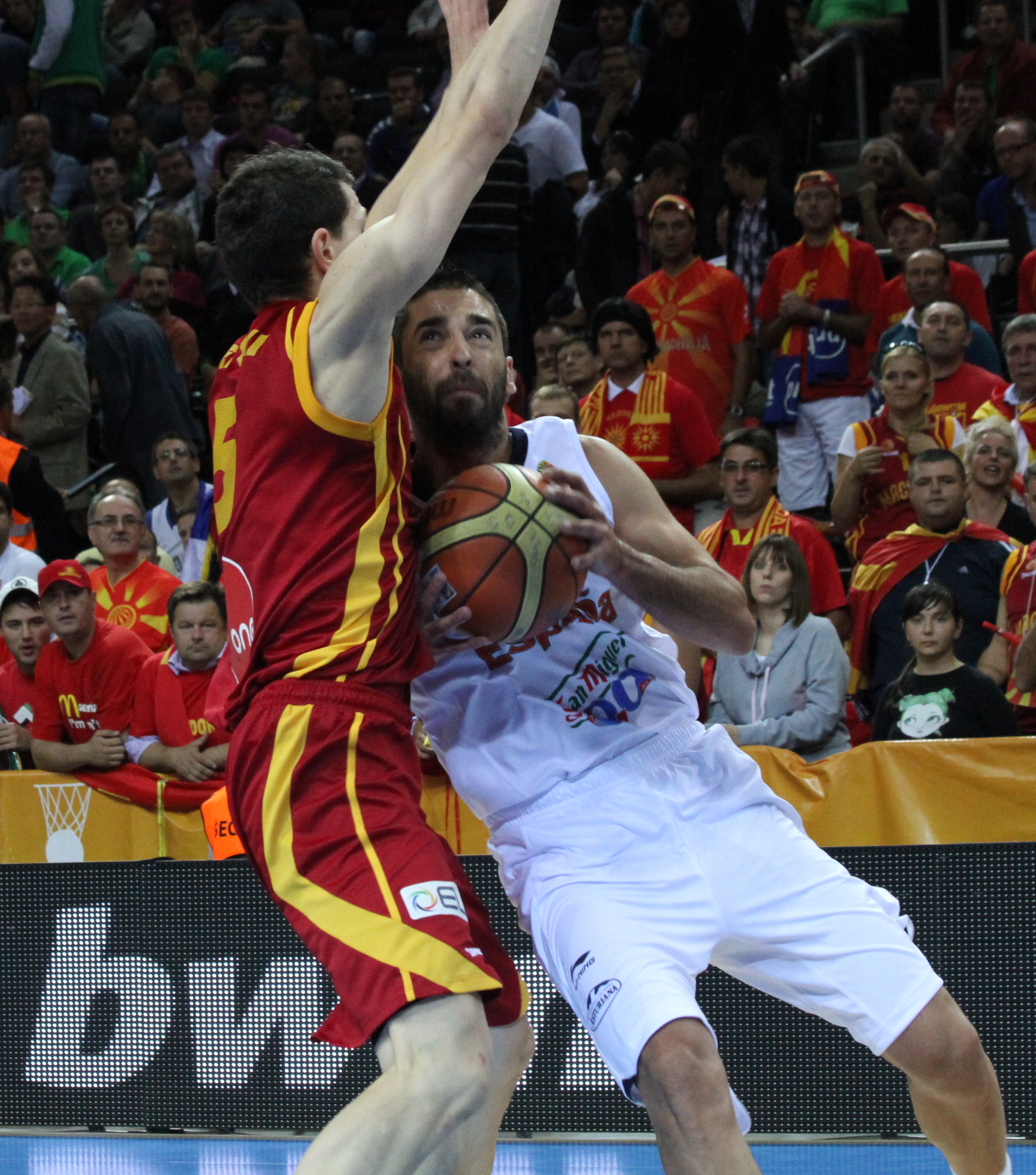
Navarro with Spain's national team, attacking the paint against Macedonia, in 2011.

In the summer of 1998, Navarro was a member of the Spanish under-18 junior national team that won the gold medal at the 1998 FIBA Europe Under-18 Championship. He was also one of "The Golden Generation" boys of Spain (along with Felipe Reyes and future NBA players Pau Gasol and Raúl López) that defeated the United States' junior national team at the 1999 FIBA Under-19 World Cup.

Navarro played with the senior Spanish national team at the 2000 Sydney Summer Olympics. He also played at the 2001 EuroBasket, where he won two games during the tournament with buzzer-beaters. He scored 27 points during the bronze medal game against Germany. At the 2003 EuroBasket in Sweden, Navarro won a silver medal with the Spain's national team.

In Spain's seventh-place finish at the 2004 Athens Summer Olympics, he scored 18 points in Spain's loss against Team USA. At the 2005 EuroBasket, the Spanish national team, playing without Pau Gasol, finished in fourth place. Navarro was the second leading scorer of the tournament, with an average of 25.2 points per game, finishing behind only Dirk Nowitzki. In August 2006, he played on the Spanish national team that won the gold medal at the 2006 FIBA World Championship, after they defeated Greece in the tournament's final; after the Greeks had earlier defeated Team USA, in their semifinal, by a score of 101–95.

In September 2007, Navarro and Spain lost against Russia, in the gold medal game at the 2007 EuroBasket, which was held in Madrid, on Spain's home floor. Navarro was a member of Spain's national team that won the silver medal at the 2008 Beijing Summer Olympics. Navarro scored 18 points in the gold medal game that Spain lost against Team USA.

Navarro was part of the Spain's national team that won the 2009 EuroBasket. As the defending champions, Spain retained their European crown at the 2011 EuroBasket. Navarro led his team with a game-high 27 points in the championship game over France. He earned All-Tournament Team accolades, along with his teammate, Pau Gasol, and he was named the EuroBasket MVP.

Navarro won a silver medal with Spain at the 2012 London Summer Olympics. He also played at the 2014 FIBA World Cup, at the 2016 Rio Summer Olympics, where he won a bronze medal, and at the 2017 EuroBasket, where he also won a bronze medal.

== Post-playing career ==
After Navarro retired from playing professional basketball, in August 2018, he began working in the front office of the Spanish Liga ACB club FC Barcelona. In April 2021, Navarro was appointed as Barcelona's general manager, by the President of the club, Joan Laporta. Navarro replaced Nacho Rodríguez in the role. On July 31, 2026, the club announced Navarro would be stepping away from his role as general manager to become an ambassador and player mentor for Barcelona's basketball section. He was replaced on the job by Xevi Pujol.

== Career statistics ==
Legend
GP	Games played	GS	Games started	MPG	Minutes per game
FG%	Field-goal percentage	3P%	3-point field-goal percentage	FT%	Free-throw percentage
RPG	Rebounds per game	APG	Assists per game	SPG	Steals per game
BPG	Blocks per game	PPG	Points per game	PIR	Performance index rating
**Bold**	Career high

=== NBA ===
*	Led the league

==== Regular season ====
Year	Team	GP	GS	MPG	FG%	3P%	FT%	RPG	APG	SPG	BPG	PPG
2007–08	Memphis	82*	30	25.8	.402	.361	.849	2.6	2.2	.6	.0	10.9
Career		82	30	25.8	.402	.361	.849	2.6	2.2	.6	.0	10.9

=== EuroLeague ===
†	Denotes season in which Navarro won the EuroLeague
*	Led the league

Year	Team	GP	GS	MPG	FG%	3P%	FT%	RPG	APG	SPG	BPG	PPG	PIR
FIBA EuroLeague
1997–98	Barcelona	3	0	3.0	.000	.000	.000	.0	0.3	0.7	.0	0.0	0.0
Spent the 1998–99 season in the FIBA Korać Cup competition
1999–00	Barcelona	22	5	18.7	.444	.452	.800	1.3	1.3	0.9	.0	7.7	5.4
EuroLeague
2000–01	Barcelona	12	8	27.8	.465	.388	.682	**2.8**	2.7	1.1	—	12.7	12.2
2001–02	Barcelona	17	2	19.0	.433	.333	.816	1.5	1.9	1.0	—	10.4	10.3
2002–03†	Barcelona	22	6	26.1	.398	.367	.880	1.6	1.4	.6	.0	11.5	10.0
2003–04	Barcelona	20	6	25.4	.494	.425	.808	1.5	1.5	1.1	**.1**	13.7	12.4
2004–05	Barcelona	20	10	26.6	.437	.395	.892	2.0	1.9	**1.3**	—	13.3	13.2
2005–06	Barcelona	22	**21**	27.4	.438	**.462**	.806	2.3	2.5	1.0	—	15.1	13.4
2006–07	Barcelona	22	**21**	**28.6**	**.496**	.408	.838	2.0	3.0	.9	—	**16.8**	**16.9**
2008–09	Barcelona	21	**21***	27.7	.428	.363	.935	1.6	**3.6**	**1.3**	—	14.7	15.1
2009–10†	Barcelona	21	**21**	25.4	.430	.348	.857	1.4	3.1	.9	—	14.1	14.1
2010–11	Barcelona	15	12	26.5	.478	.398	.868	1.5	2.8	.3	—	14.1	12.9
2011–12	Barcelona	16	13	25.6	.402	.297	.880	1.3	3.2	1.0	—	13.6	12.9
2012–13	Barcelona	**26**	**21**	25.2	.448	.445	.852	1.7	2.2	.3	—	13.2	12.0
2013–14	Barcelona	**26**	**21**	24.0	.404	.346	.868	1.7	3.1	.5	—	11.3	11.4
2014–15	Barcelona	17	14	22.1	.370	.356	.865	1.6	3.1	.2	—	10.5	10.8
2015–16	Barcelona	**26**	**21**	20.3	.373	.325	.900	.9	2.2	.5	—	9.0	7.2
2016–17	Barcelona	16	8	15.4	.319	.286	**.938**	1.1	1.8	.4	—	5.7	3.4
2017–18	Barcelona	22	7	15.5	.343	.333	.889	1.1	1.9	.3	—	6.9	5.6
Career		341	225	25.0	.426	.373	.861	1.6	2.4	.7	.0	12.2	11.4

=== Domestic leagues ===
==== Regular season ====
†	Denotes season in which Navarro won the Liga ACB championship
*	Led the league

Year	Team	League	GP	MPG	FG%	3P%	FT%	RPG	APG	SPG	BPG	PPG
1998-99†	(Spain) Barcelona	ACB	12	9.4	.361	.111	.676	.7	.9	.4	—	4.2
1999-2000	(Spain) Barcelona	ACB	17	9.7	**.510**	.235	.826	.5	.8	.4	—	4.3
2000-01†	(Spain) Barcelona	ACB	**34**	17.1	.374	.231	.796	.9	1.3	.8	—	7.3
2001-02	(Spain) Barcelona	ACB	31	21.8	.388	.311	.856	2.1	2.2	1.3	—	13.1
2002-03†	(Spain) Barcelona	ACB	**34**	28.8	.468	.373	.783	1.9	2.3	1.0	—	10.2
2003-04†	(Spain) Barcelona	ACB	33	27.5	.416	.382	.865	2.2	1.9	.7	**.1**	13.6
2004-05	(Spain) Barcelona	ACB	33	26.1	.503	**.473***	.783	1.6	2.3	.8	—	14.3
2005-06	(Spain) Barcelona	ACB	30	**30.3**	.483	.429	.875	2.1	2.8	.9	—	**17.9**
2006-07	(Spain) Barcelona	ACB	33	30.0	.460	.446	.880	2.0	2.7	**1.5**	—	17.3*
2008-09†	(Spain) Barcelona	ACB	28	27.4	.442	.411	.865	1.9	**3.3**	.9	—	15.7
2009-10	(Spain) Barcelona	ACB	33	25.9	.466	.394	.845	1.6	2.2	.9	—	14.8
2010-11†	(Spain) Barcelona	ACB	27	25.5	.464	.431	.882	1.9	2.7	.7	—	16.4
2011-12†	(Spain) Barcelona	ACB	28	23.8	.419	.367	.864	1.4	3.0	.4	—	13.7
2012-13	(Spain) Barcelona	ACB	19	21.8	.478	.415	.868	**2.5**	2.0	.4	—	12.0
2013-14†	(Spain) Barcelona	ACB	28	22.1	.372	.316	.807	2.3	3.1	.6	—	9.6
2014-15	(Spain) Barcelona	ACB	17	26.0	.347	.350	.786	1.4	2.1	.4	—	6.0
2014-15	(Spain) Barcelona	ACB	21	17.0	.417	.381	.917	1.2	1.9	.5	—	8.1
2016-17	(Spain) Barcelona	ACB	16	13.4	.462	.333	**.944***	.7	1.2	.5	—	7.3
2017-18	(Spain) Barcelona	ACB	27	13.1	.405	.413	.895	1.6	1.2	.3	—	5.6

== Awards and accomplishments ==
=== Club honours ===
- EuroLeague: 2002–03, 2009–10
- Spanish League: 1998–99, 2000–01, 2002–03, 2003–04, 2008–09, 2010–11, 2011–12, 2013–14
- FIBA Korać Cup: 1998–99
- Spanish King's Cup: 2001, 2003, 2007, 2010, 2011, 2013, 2018
- Spanish Supercup: 2004, 2009, 2010, 2011, 2015
- Catalan League: 2000, 2001, 2004, 2009, 2010, 2011, 2012, 2013, 2014, 2015, 2016, 2017, 2018

=== Spanish junior national team ===
- 1998 FIBA Under-18 EuroBasket: Gold
- 1999 FIBA Under-19 World Cup: Gold

=== Spanish senior national team ===
- 2001 EuroBasket: Bronze
- 2003 EuroBasket: Silver
- 2006 FIBA World Cup: Gold
- 2007 EuroBasket: Silver
- 2008 Summer Olympics: Silver
- 2009 EuroBasket: Gold
- 2011 EuroBasket : Gold
- 2012 Summer Olympics: Silver
- 2016 Summer Olympics: Bronze
- 2017 EuroBasket: Bronze

=== Individual awards ===
==== Clubs ====
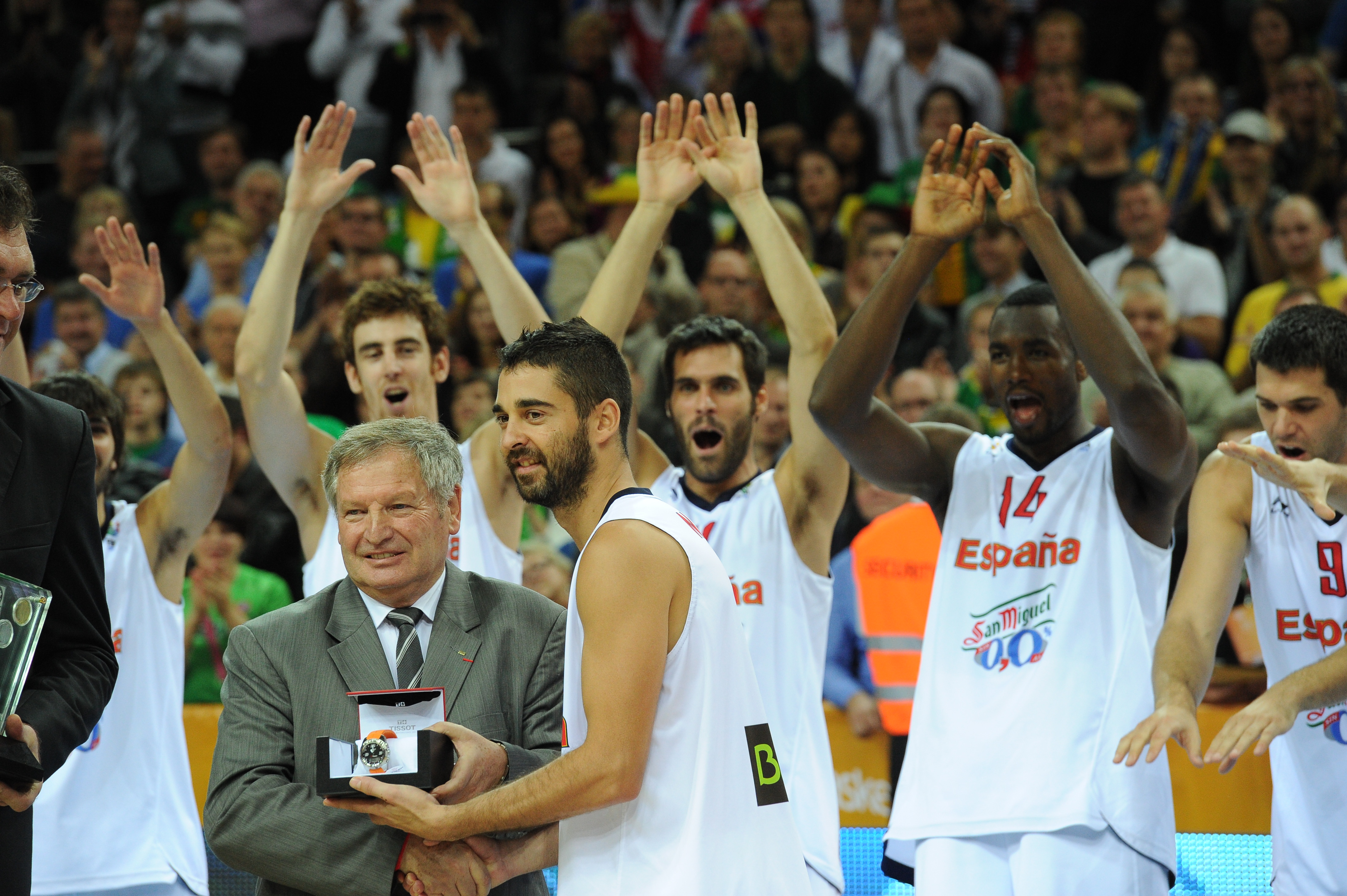
Navarro, receiving the 2011 EuroBasket's MVP award trophy.

- Catalan League Final MVP: 2000, 2001
- All-Spanish League Team: 2006, 2007, 2009, 2010
- Spanish League MVP: 2006
- Eurobasket News All-EuroLeague Guard of the Year: (2006)
- EuroLeague Top Scorer: 2007
- Spanish League Top Scorer: 2007
- NBA All-Rookie Second Team: 2008
- EuroLeague MVP: 2009
- Spanish League Finals MVP: 2009, 2011, 2014
- Spanish Supercup MVP: 2009, 2010, 2011
- Eurobasket News All-Europe Player of the Year: 2009, 2010, 2011
- Mr. Europa: 2010
- EuroLeague 2000–2010 All-Decade Team: 2010
- EuroLeague 2010–2020 All-Decade Team: 2020
- EuroLeague Legend: 2014
- EuroLeague Final Four MVP: 2010
- EuroLeague Finals Top Scorer: (2010)
- All-EuroLeague Team: 2006, 2007, 2009, 2010, 2011, 2012, 2013
  - All-EuroLeague First Team: 2006, 2007, 2009, 2010, 2011
  - All-EuroLeague Second Team: 2012, 2013
- Eurobasket.com's Liga ACB Domestic Player of the Year: (2010, 2012)
- 101 Greats of European Basketball: (2018)
- Number 11 jersey retired by FC Barcelona: (2019)

==== Spanish national team ====
- EuroBasket All-Tournament Team: 2005, 2011
- EuroBasket MVP: 2011
- Spanish Sportsman of the Year: 2011

== See also ==
- Basketball in Spain
- List of athletes with the most appearances at Olympic Games
