= List of players in the Naismith Memorial Basketball Hall of Fame =

The Naismith Memorial Basketball Hall of Fame, located in Springfield, Massachusetts, honors players who have shown exceptional skill at basketball, all-time great coaches, referees, and other major contributors to the sport. It is named after Dr. James Naismith, who conceived the sport in 1891; he was inducted into the Hall as a contributor in 1959. The Player category has existed since the beginning of the Hall of Fame. For a person to be eligible on the ballot for Hall of Fame honors as a player, he or she must be fully retired for three years. If a player retired for a short period, then "his/her case and eligibility is reviewed on an individual basis".

As part of the inaugural class of 1959, four players were inducted; over 150 more individuals have been inducted as players since then. Five players have also been inducted as coaches: John Wooden in 1973, Lenny Wilkens in 1998, Bill Sharman in 2004, Tom Heinsohn in 2015, and Bill Russell in 2021.

Of the inducted players, 36 were also members of teams that have been inducted into the Hall as units.

- Zack Clayton, Tarzan Cooper, William "Pop" Gates, and John Isaacs were members of the New York Renaissance. The induction category of another former player for the team, Nathaniel "Sweetwater" Clifton, is subject to dispute; he was originally announced as a contributor, but is now listed with player inductees by the Hall.
- Marques Haynes and Reece "Goose" Tatum were two of the most famous players of the Harlem Globetrotters. Five other players who made their greatest contributions with other teams—Sonny Boswell, Wilt Chamberlain, Connie Hawkins, Inman "Big Jack" Jackson, Albert "Runt" Pullins, and Lynette Woodard—were members of the Globetrotters at some point in their professional careers. Furthermore, longtime member Meadowlark Lemon has been inducted as a contributor, and the aforementioned Clifton, who briefly played for the team, is (depending on definitions) a member as either a player or contributor.
- Walt Bellamy, Jerry Lucas, Oscar Robertson, and Jerry West were members of the 1960 United States Olympic Team.
- Charles Barkley, Larry Bird, Clyde Drexler, Patrick Ewing, Magic Johnson, Michael Jordan, Karl Malone, Chris Mullin, Scottie Pippen, David Robinson, and John Stockton were members of the 1992 United States Olympic Team, better known as the "Dream Team". In fact, all but one of the players on the "Dream Team" roster (Christian Laettner) have been inducted in the Hall of Fame as individuals.
- Carmelo Anthony, Chris Bosh, Kobe Bryant, Dwight Howard, Jason Kidd, and Dwyane Wade were members of the 2008 United States Olympic Team, better known as the "Redeem Team".

== Players ==
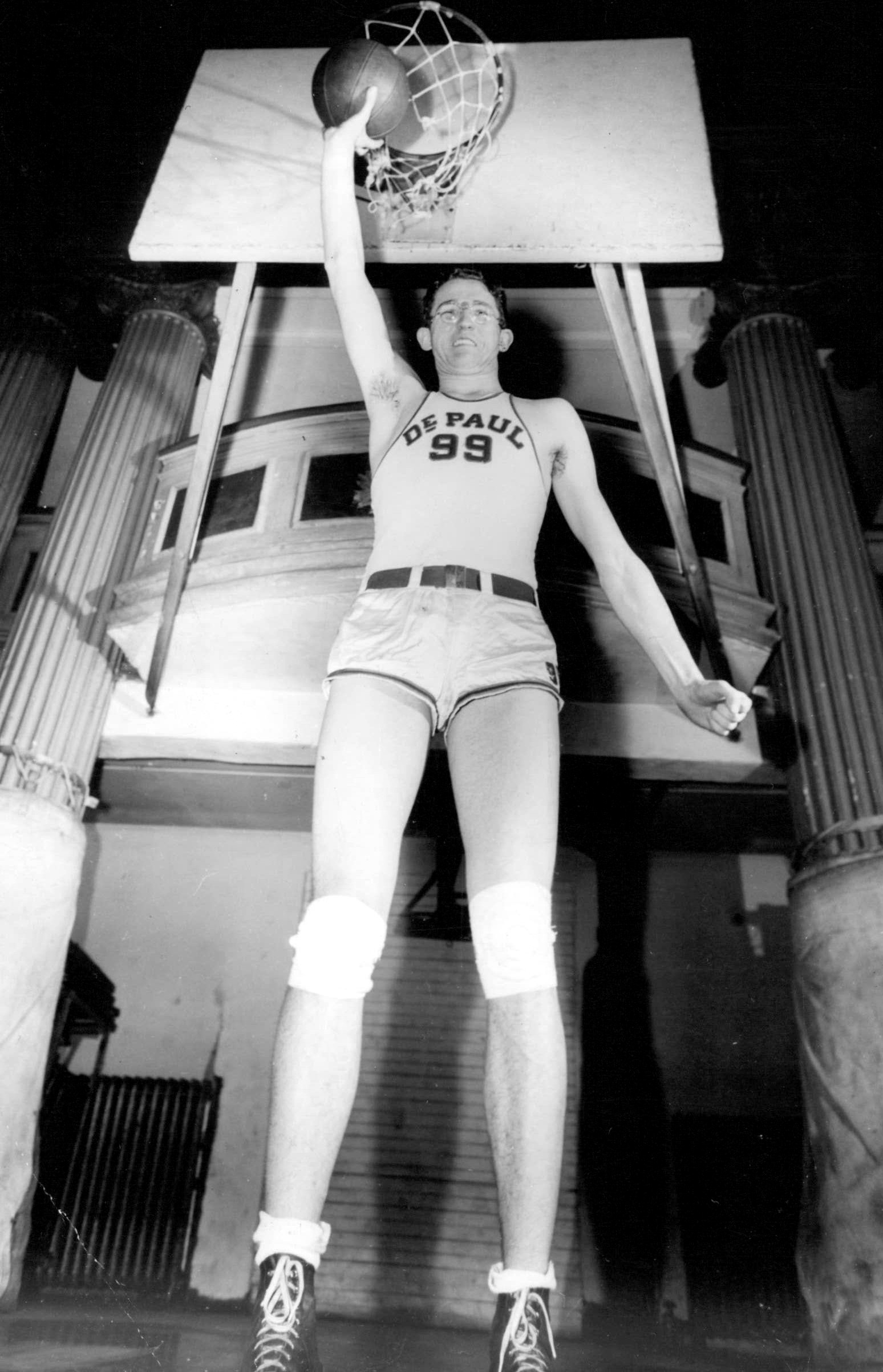
George Mikan, inducted in 1959

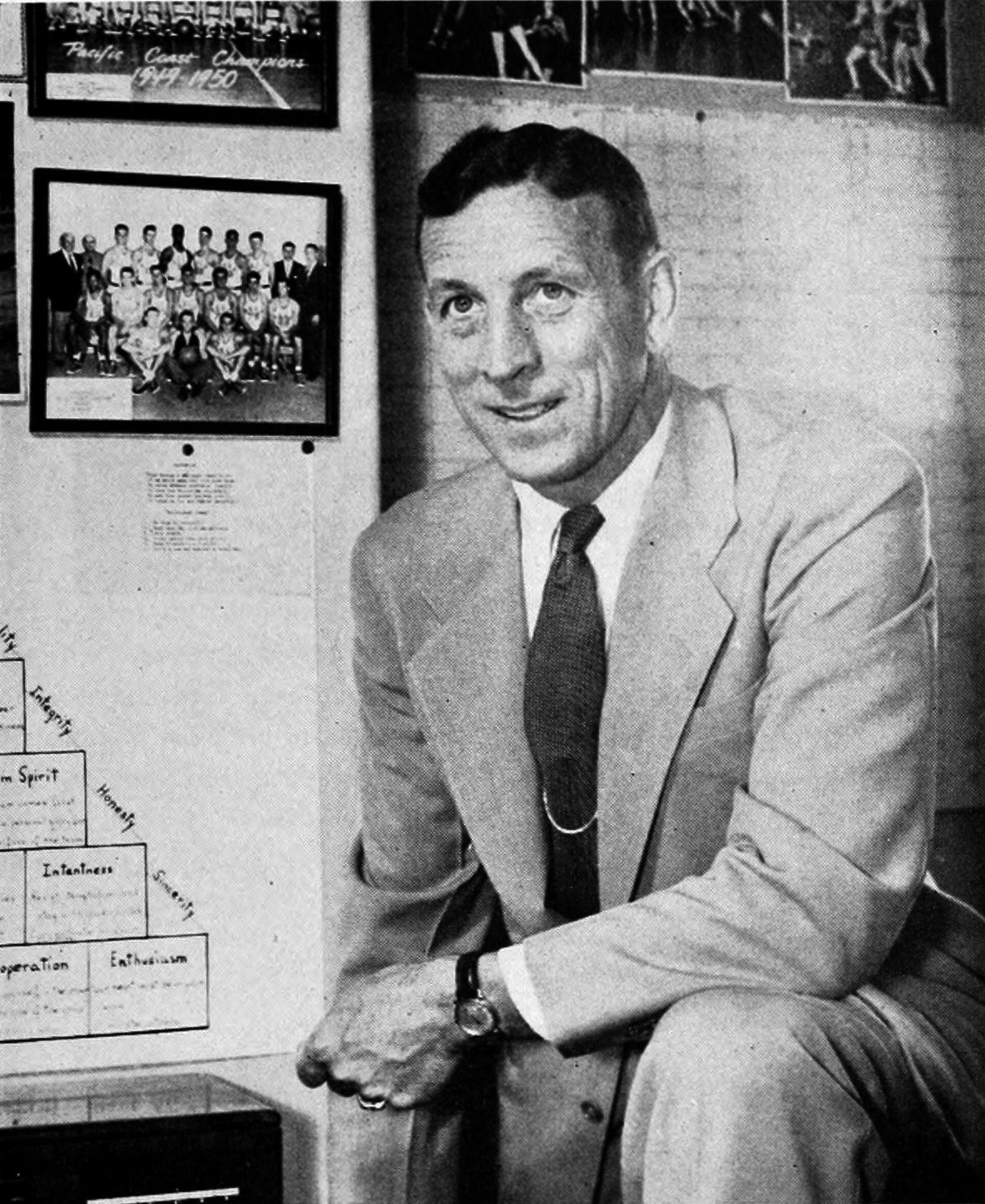
John Wooden, inducted as a player in 1960 and as a coach in 1973

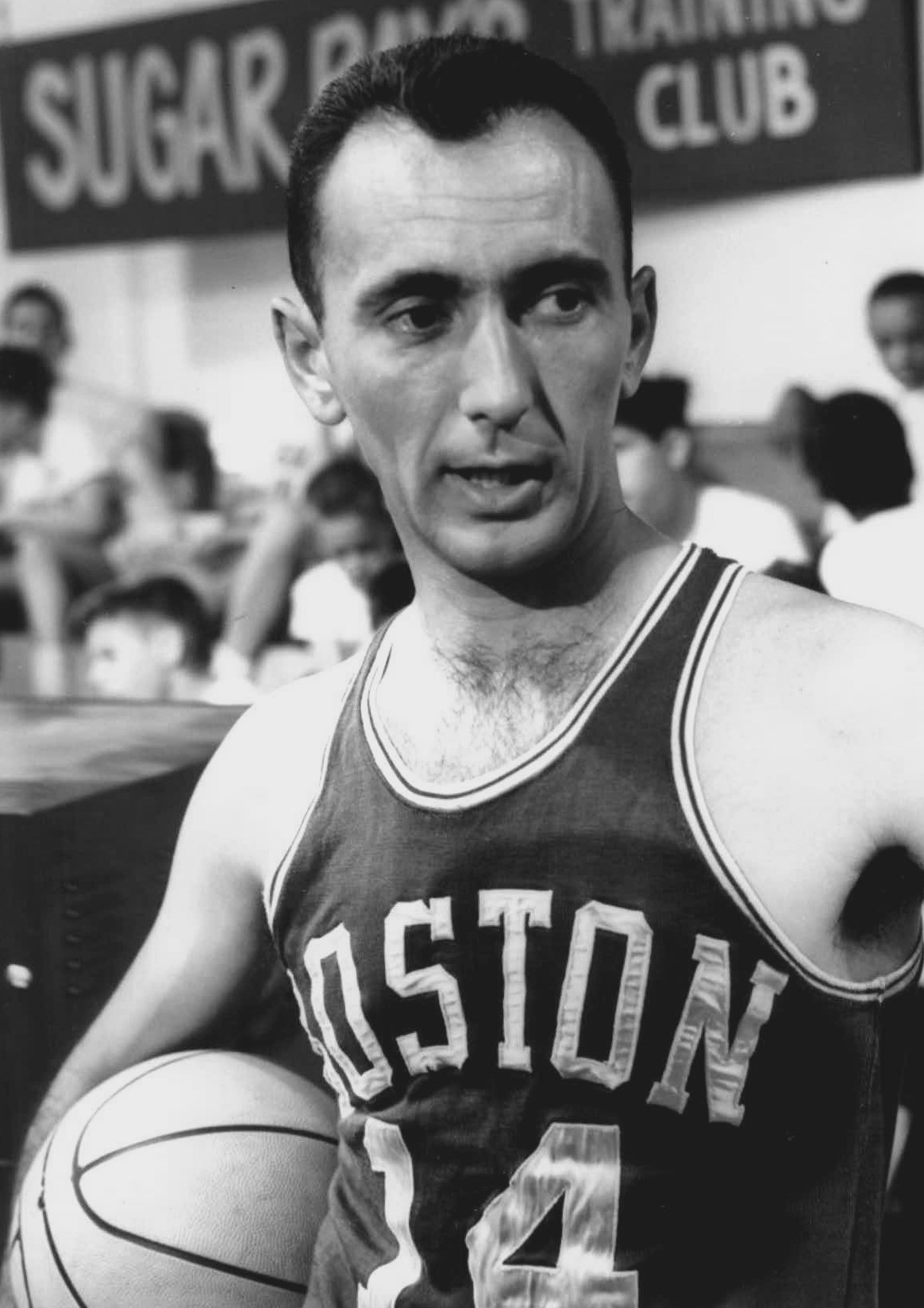
Bob Cousy, inducted in 1971

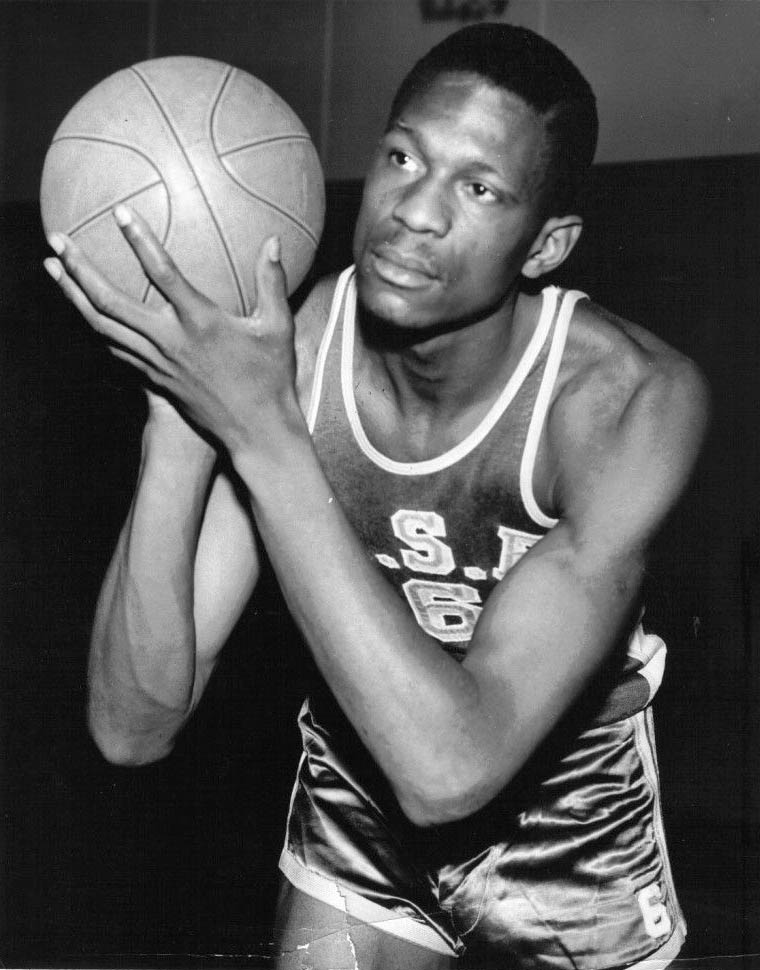
Bill Russell, inducted in 1975

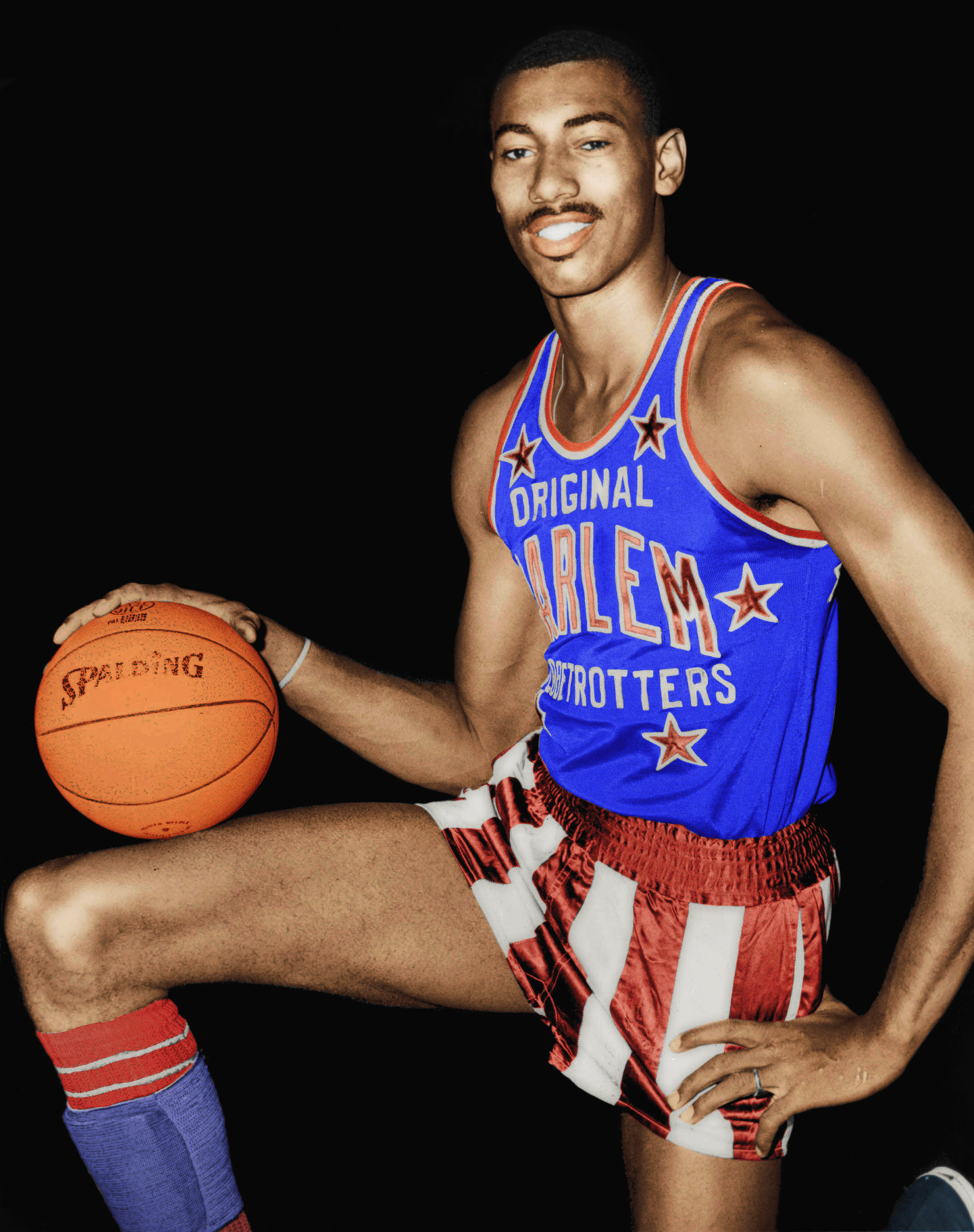
Wilt Chamberlain, inducted in 1979

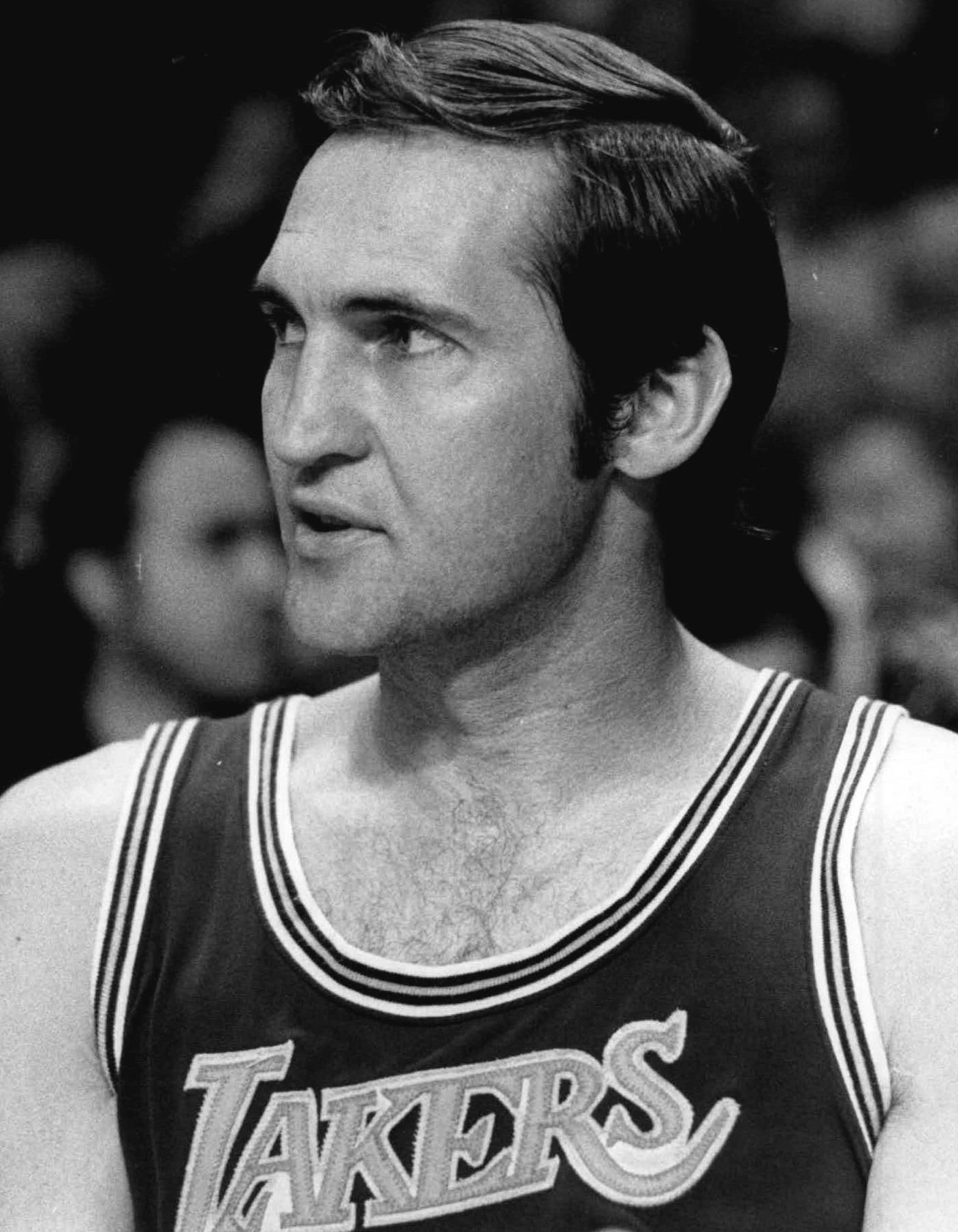
Jerry West, inducted in 1980

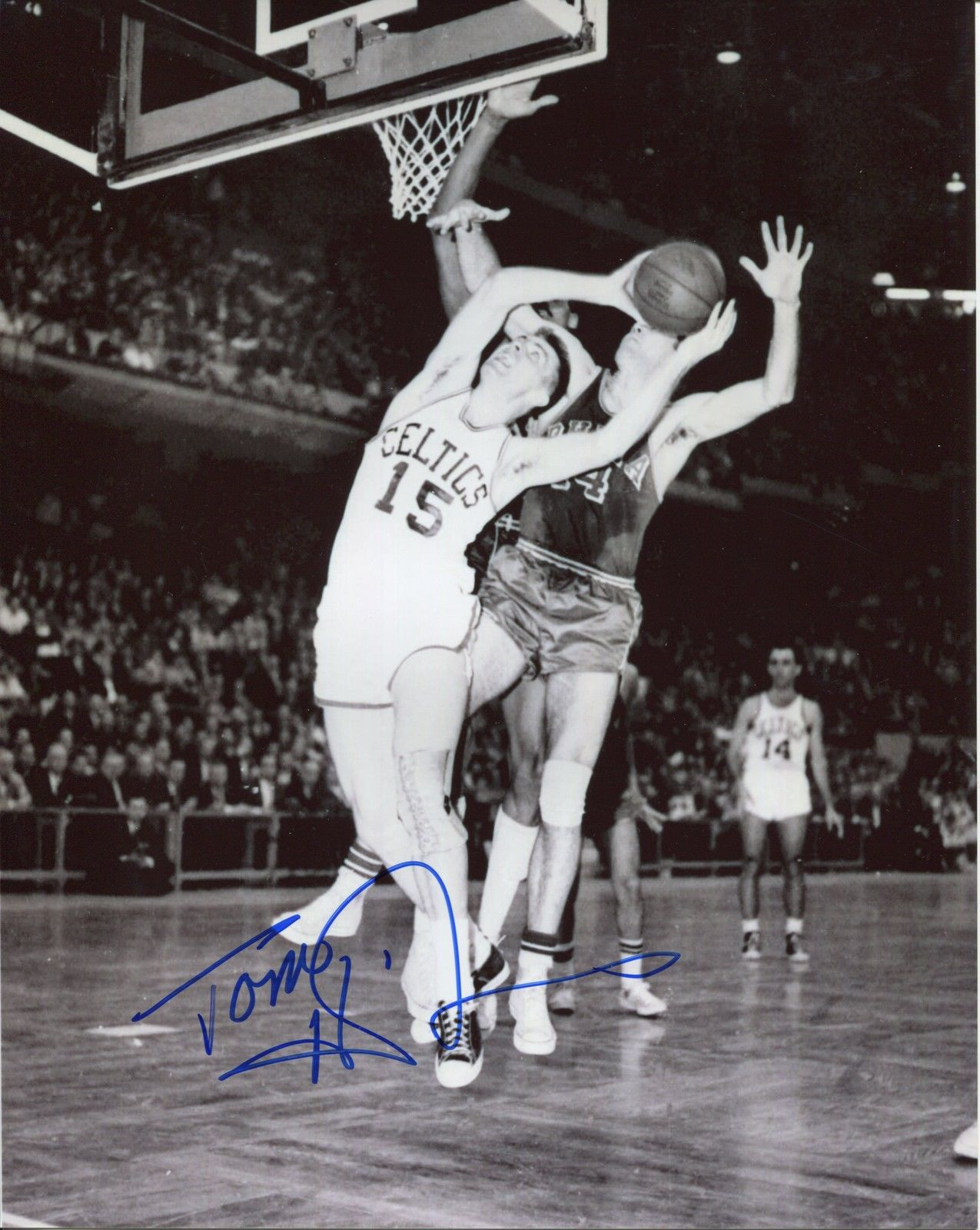
Tom Heinsohn, inducted in 1986

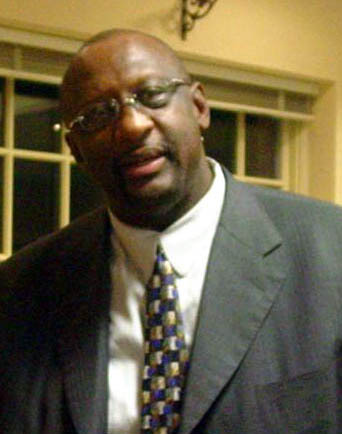
Bob Lanier, inducted in 1992

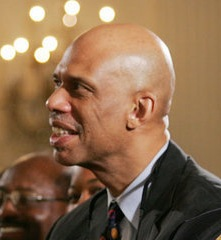
Kareem Abdul-Jabbar, inducted in 1995

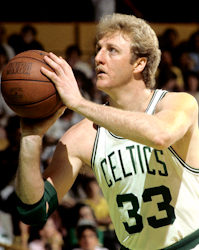
Larry Bird, inducted in 1998

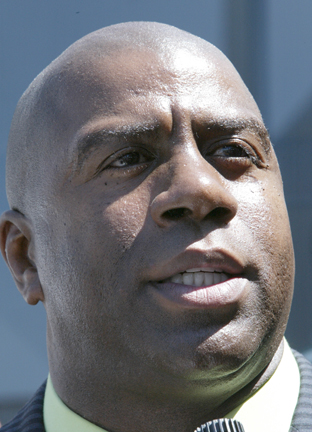
Magic Johnson, inducted in 2002

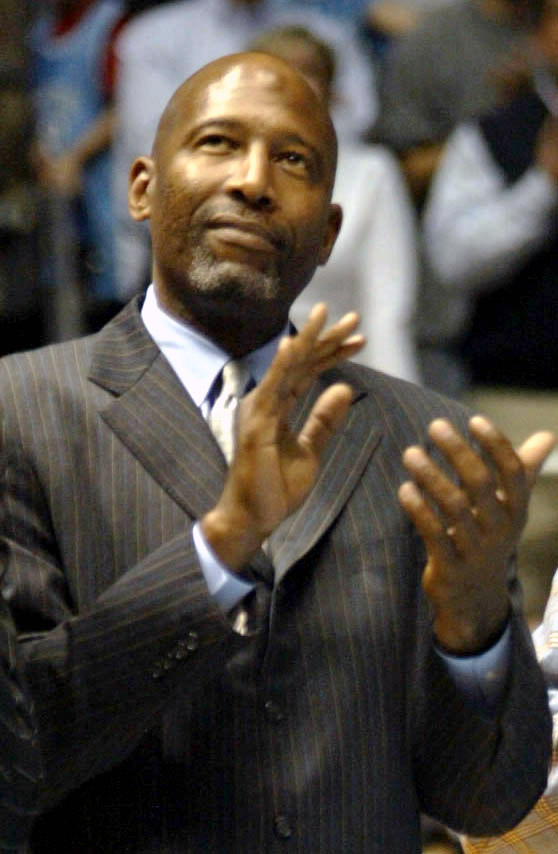
James Worthy, inducted in 2003

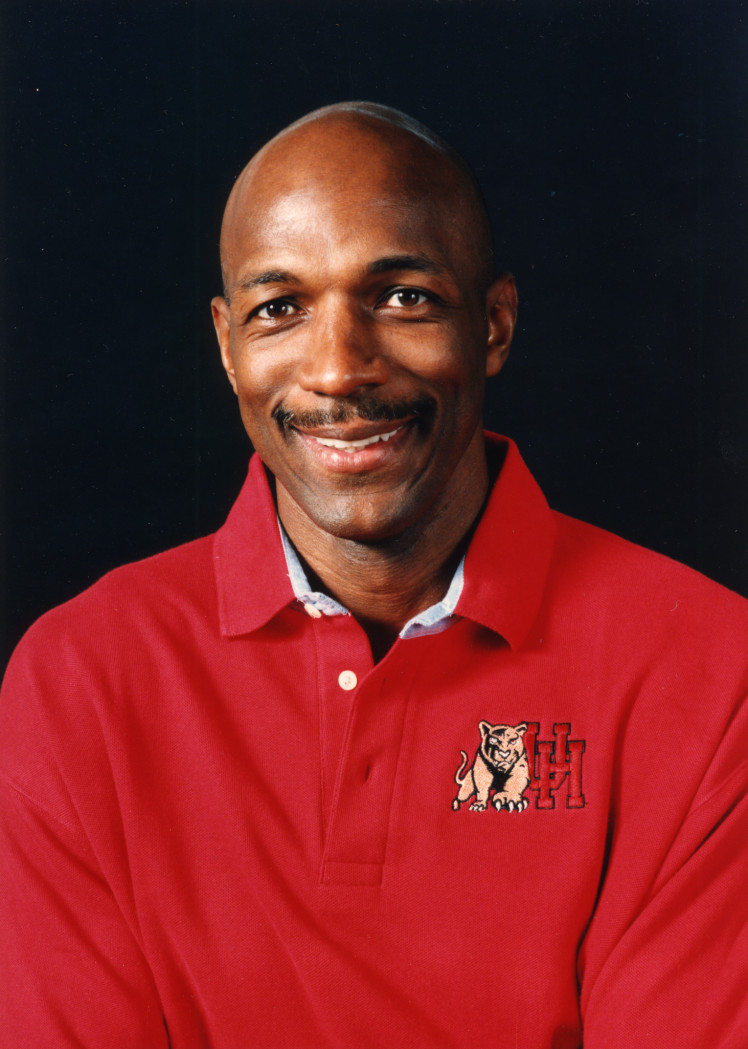
Clyde Drexler, inducted in 2004

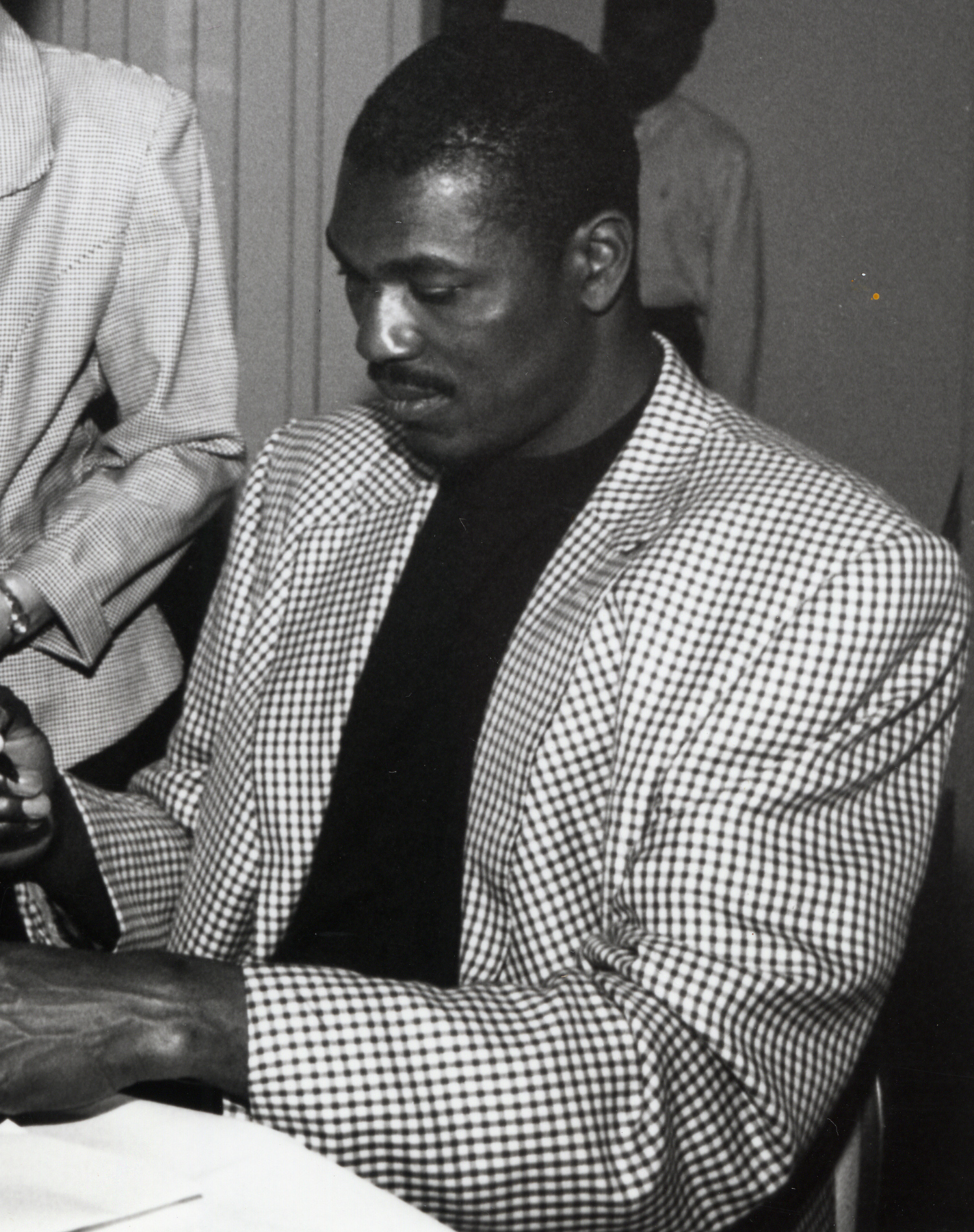
Hakeem Olajuwon, inducted in 2008

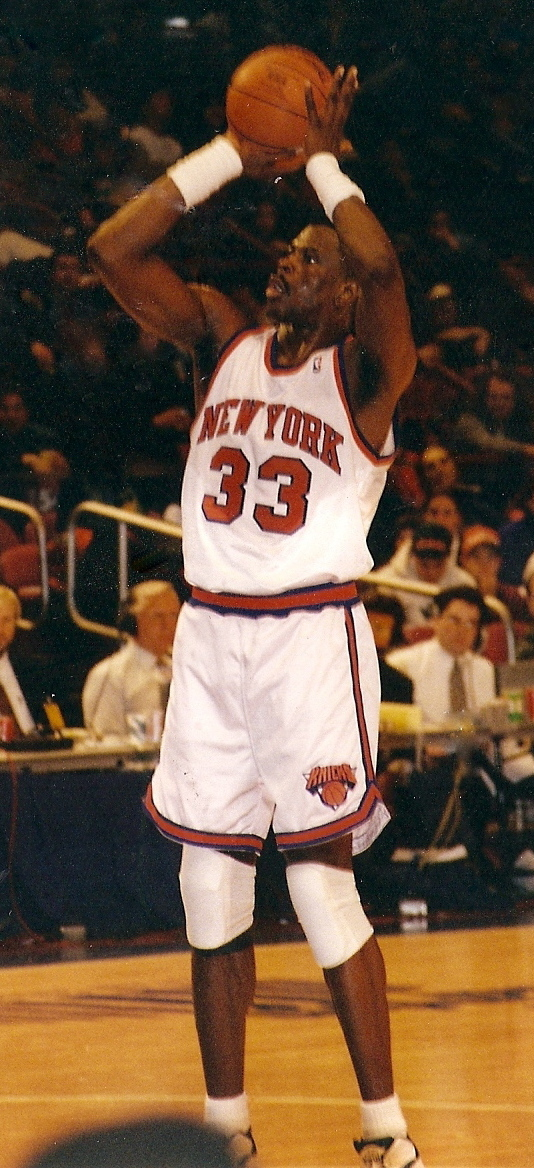
Patrick Ewing, inducted in 2008

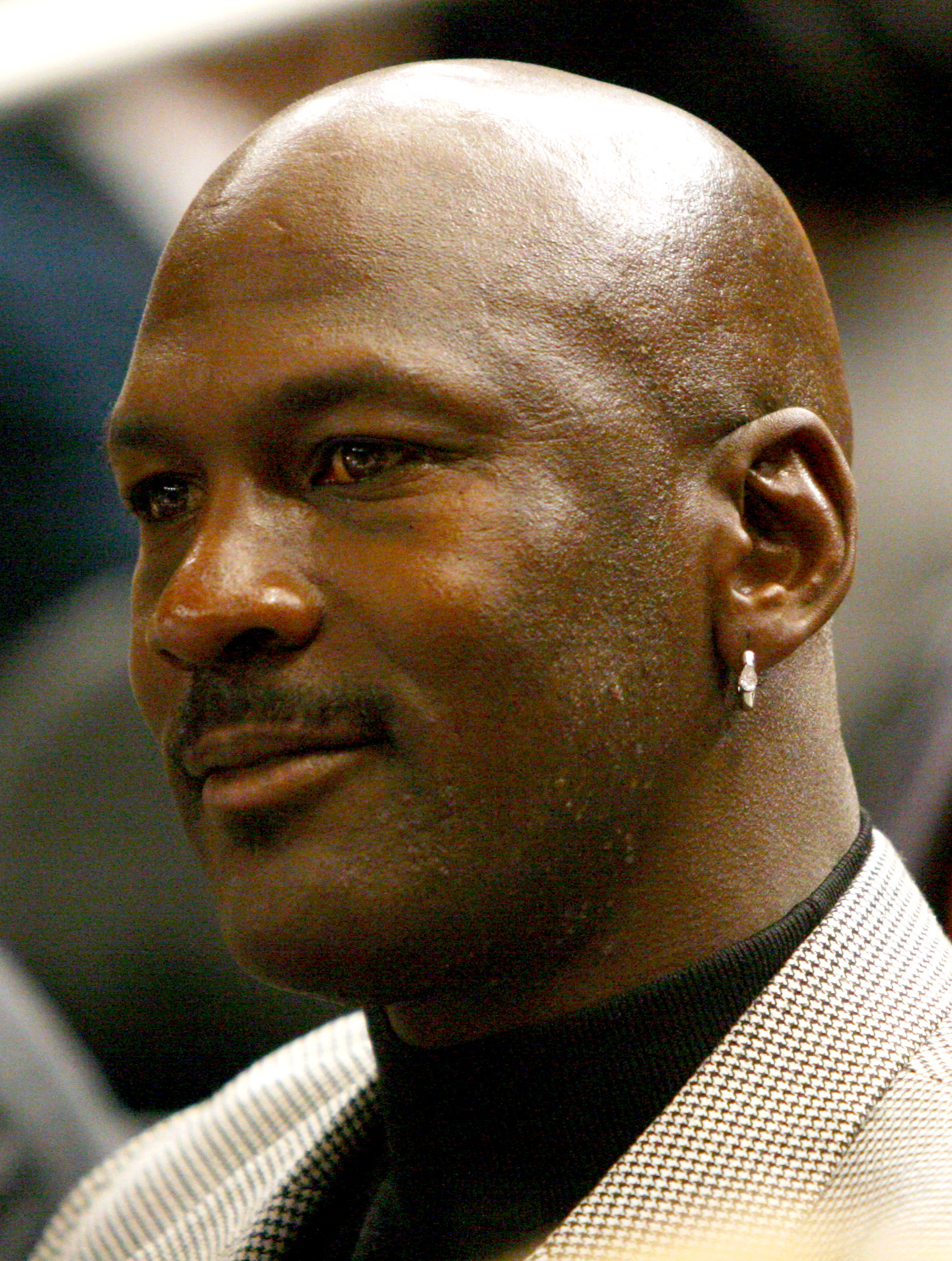
Michael Jordan, inducted in 2009

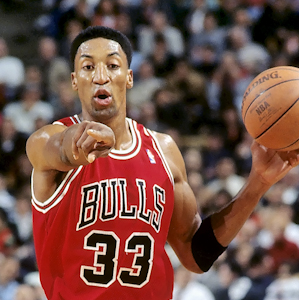
Scottie Pippen, inducted in 2010

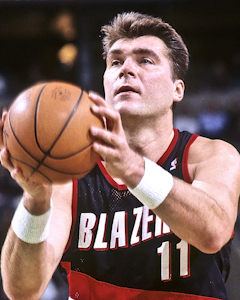
Arvydas Sabonis, inducted in 2011

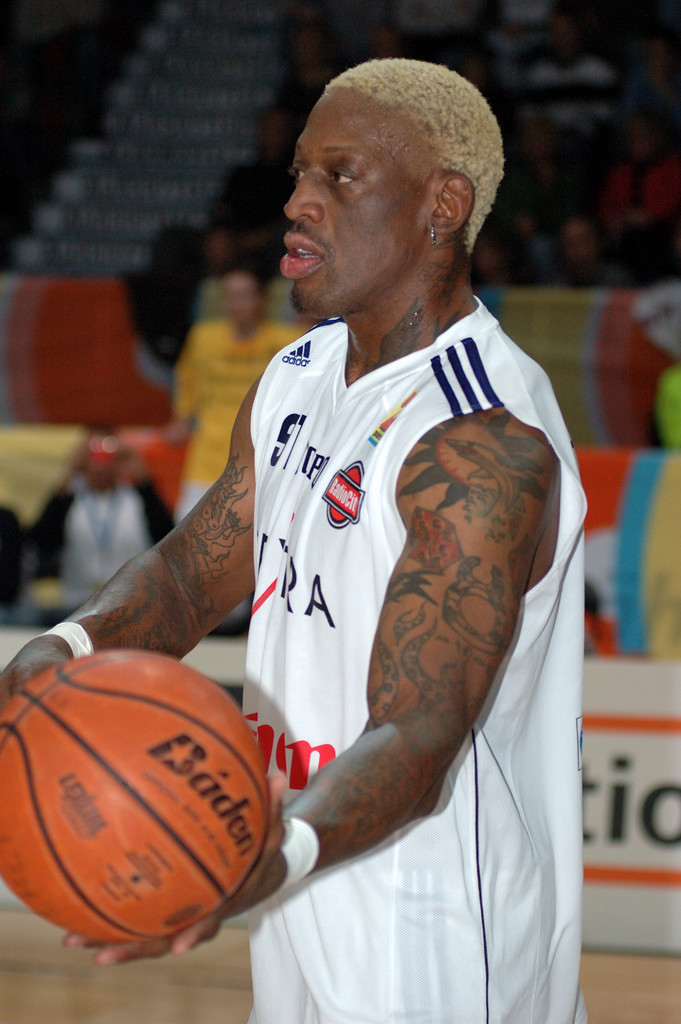
Dennis Rodman, inducted in 2011

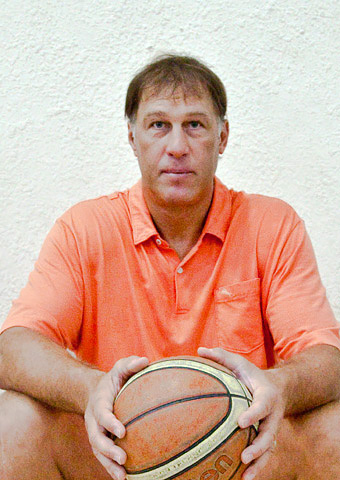
Šarūnas Marčiulionis, inducted in 2014

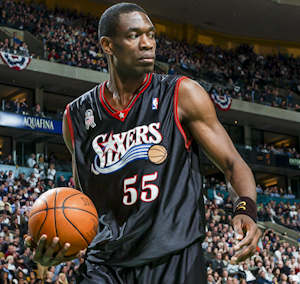
Dikembe Mutombo, inducted in 2015

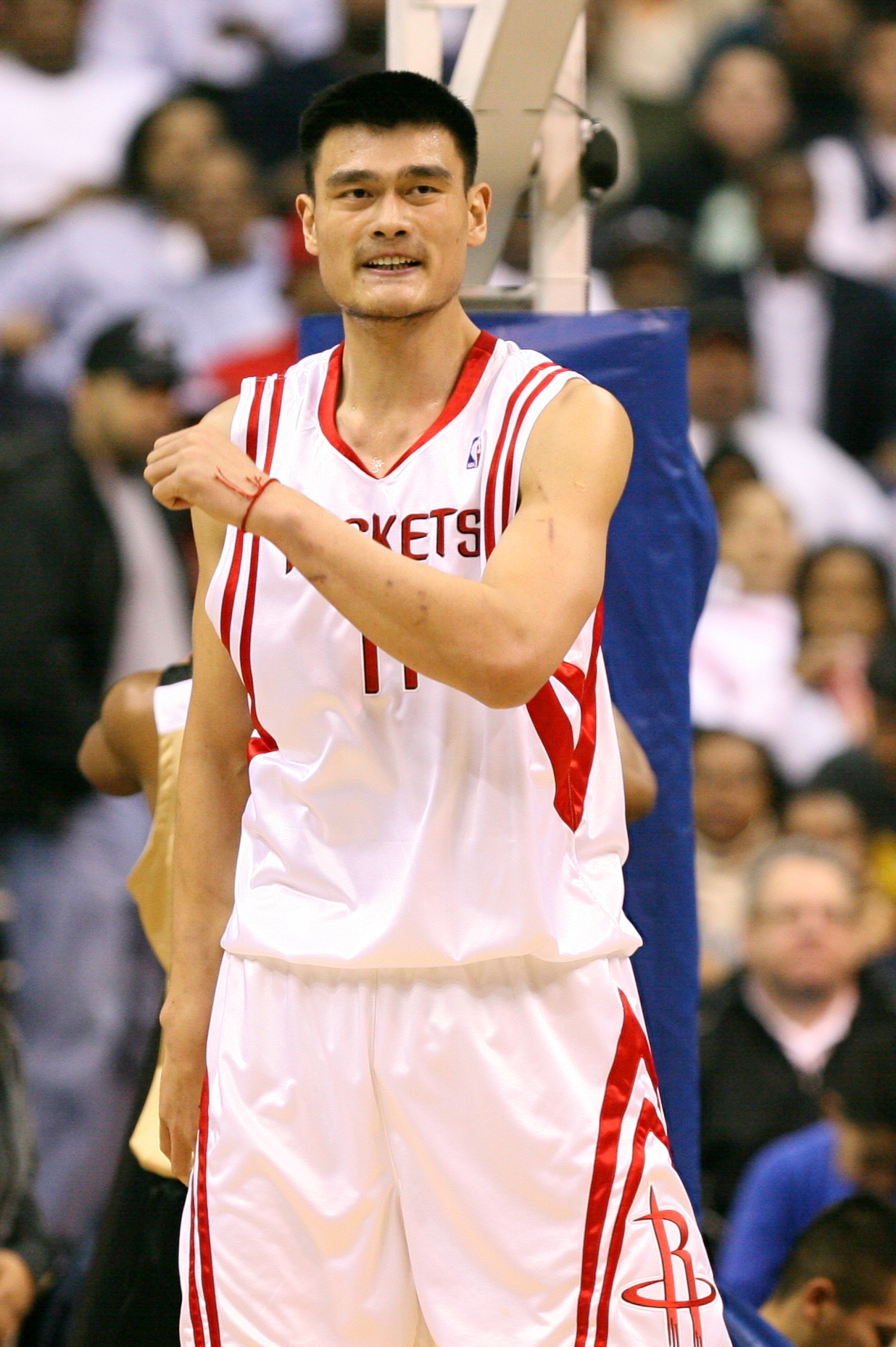
Yao Ming, inducted in 2016

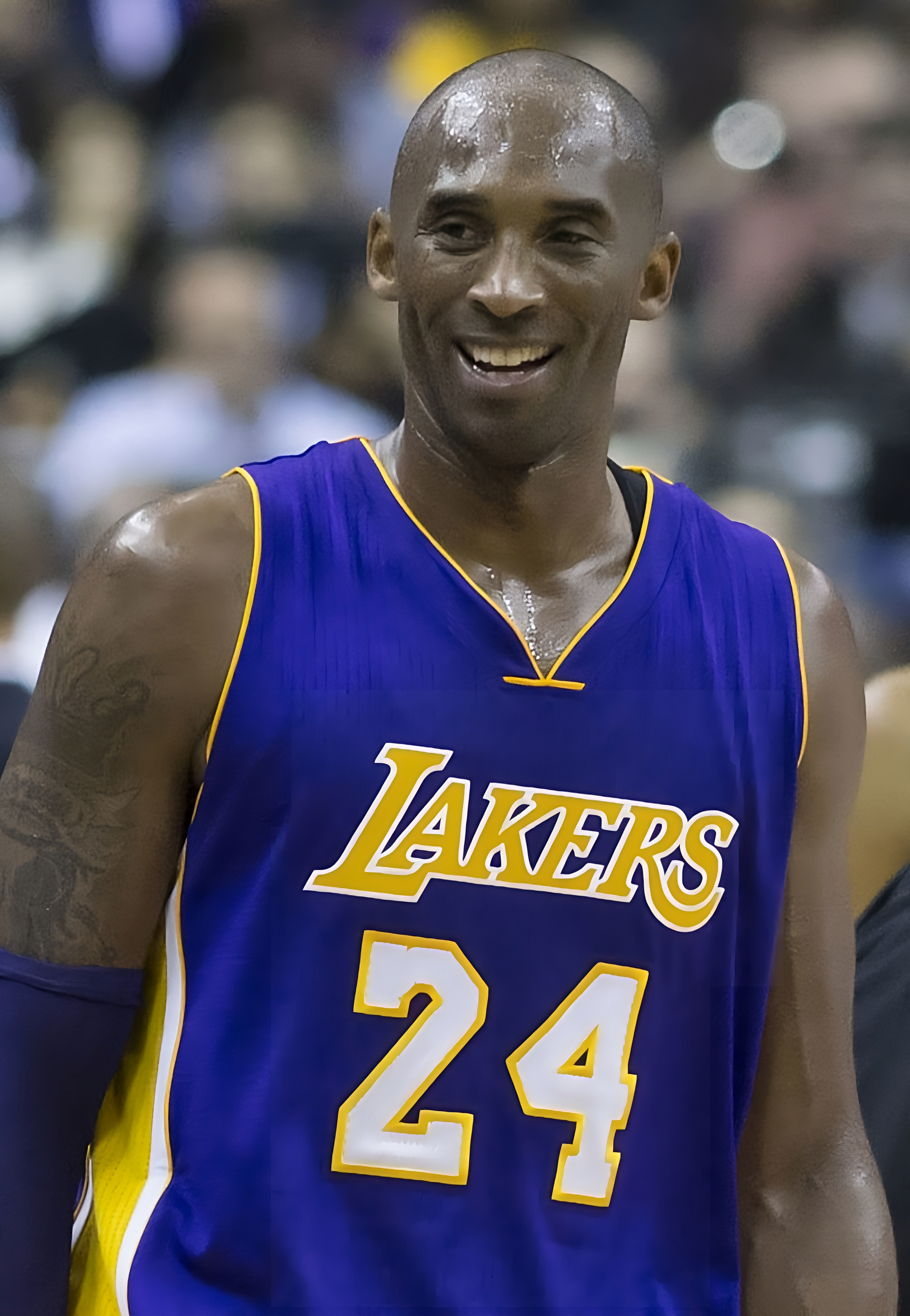
Kobe Bryant, posthumously inducted in 2020

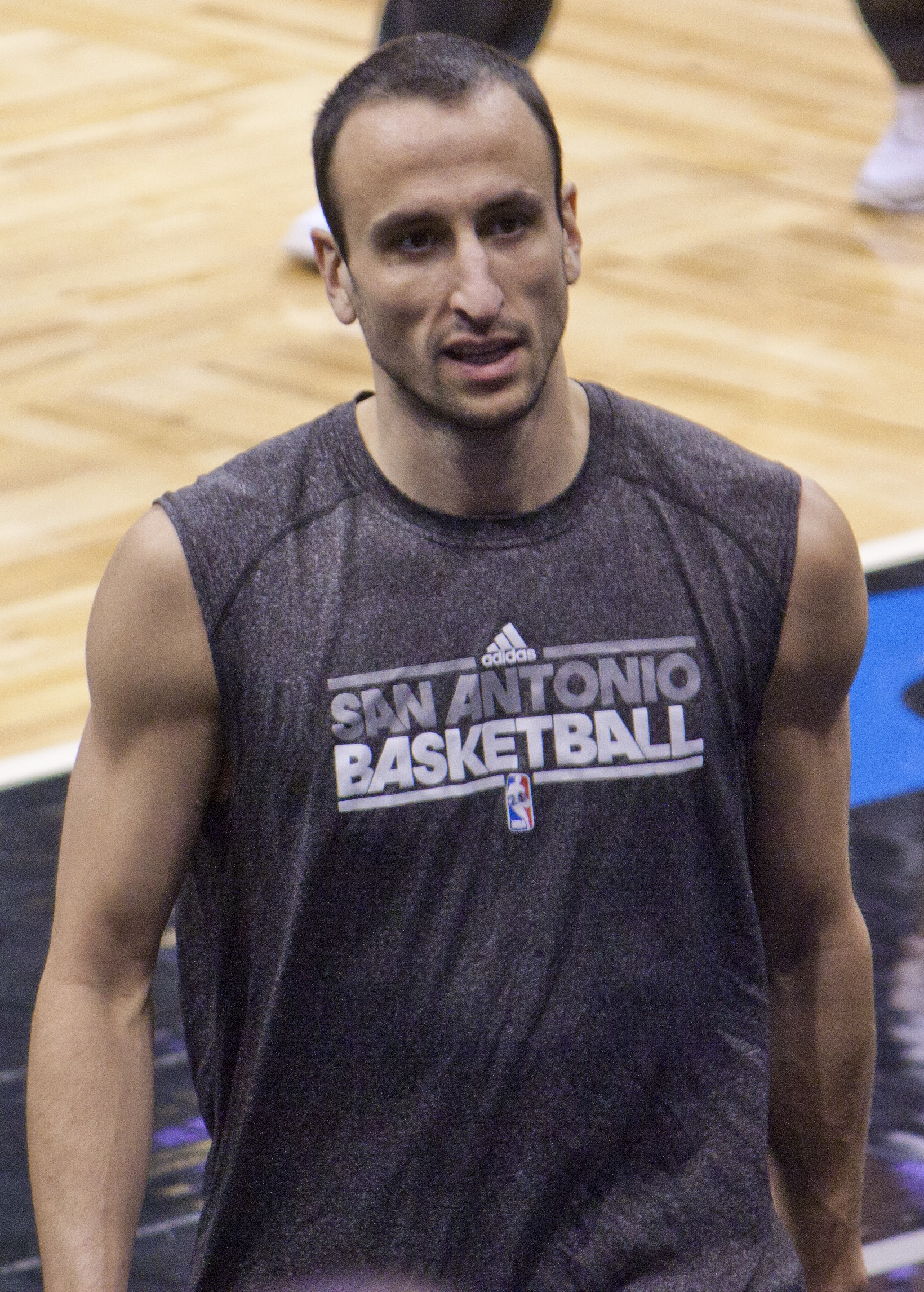
Manu Ginobili, inducted in 2022

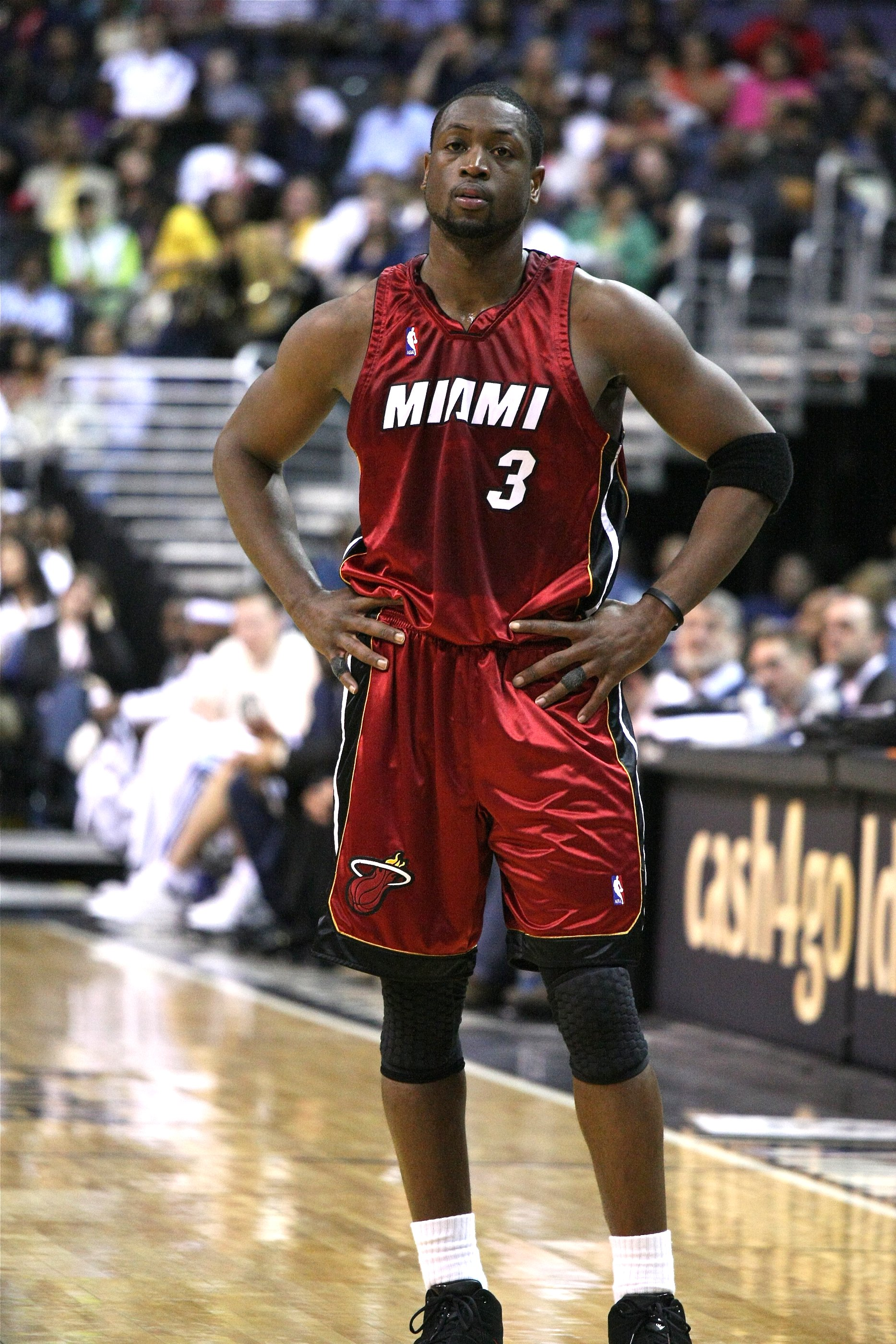
Dwyane Wade, inducted in 2023

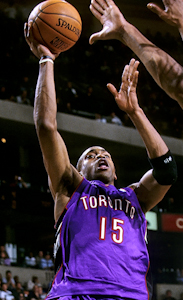
Vince Carter, inducted in 2024

Year	Inductees (Note: Nationality based on playing career)	Pos.	Achievements	Ref.
1959	(United States) Chuck Hyatt	G	National championship (Pittsburgh, 1928, 1930); College All-America (1929, 1930); Helms Foundation Player of the Year (1930)	
1959	(United States) Hank Luisetti	F	3 Pacific Coast Conference championships (Stanford, 1936–38); National championship (Stanford, 1937); Helm's Foundation Player of the Year (1937–38); 2-time All-America (1937–38)	
1959	(United States) George Mikan	C	All-America (DePaul, 1944–45); All-NBA First-Team (1950–54); 4-time NBA All-Star (1951–54); NBL/NBA Championships (Chicago Gears, 1947; Minneapolis Lakers, 1948–50, 1952–54)	
1959	(United States) John Schommer	G	Big Ten Championships (Chicago, 1907–09); All-America (1907–09); Mythical U.S. championship (Chicago, 1908); officiated Big Ten games (1911–40)	
1960	(United States) Vic Hanson	G	Helms Foundation Championship (Syracuse, 1926); Helms Foundation Player of the Year (1927); Grantland Rice's All-Time, All-America Team (1952); played with ABL's Cleveland Rosenblums (1927–30)	
1960	(United States) Ed Macauley	C-F	All-America (Saint Louis, 1948–49); Associated Press College Player of the Year (1949); MVP, NIT championship team (1949); All-NBA First-Team (1951–53); NBA Champion (1958)	
1960	(United States) Branch McCracken	F	Led Indiana in scoring (1928–30); All-Big Ten First Team (1928–30); set the Big Ten record for points (147) as a senior (1930); Helms Foundation All-America (1930); Coach of the Year (1940, 1953)	
1960	(United States) Charles Murphy	C	Big Ten co-championships (Purdue, 1928–29); Helms Foundation All-America (1929–30); set Big Ten scoring record of 143 points (1929); Big Ten Championship (1930)	
1960	(United States) John Wooden	G	Helms Foundation All-America (Purdue, 1930–32); Helms Foundation Player of the Year (1932); National championship (Purdue, 1932); All-NBL First Team (1938)	
1961	(United States) Bennie Borgmann	G	#1 scorer in the 1920s; earned fifteen scoring titles with various leagues (1922–35); led the Patterson Legionnaires and Kingston Colonials to league titles (1923); played in nearly 3,000 basketball games	
1961	(United States) Forrest DeBernardi	C	AAU championships (Kansas City Athletic Club, 1921, Hillyard Shine Alls, 1926–27, Cook Paint Company, 1928–29); 7-time AAU All-America	
1961	(United States) Bob Kurland	C	All-America (1944–46); NCAA Championships (Oklahoma A&M, 1945–46); Helms Foundation Player of the Year (1946); first 2-time Olympic Gold Medal winner (1948, 1952)	
1961	(United States) Andy Phillip	G-F	Consensus two-time All-America (1943, 1947); National College Player of the Year (Illinois, 1943); 5 championship finals (1947, 1955–58); 5-time BAA/NBA All-Star (1951–55)	
1961	(United States) John Roosma	G	3-time All-American selection at Army; 3-time All-Eastern selection at Army; led the Cadets to a 73–13 record and 33 consecutive wins; led Passaic High School to New Jersey State championships (1919–21)	
1961	(United States) Chris Steinmetz	G	Led Wisconsin National Championship Game (1905); Western championship (1905); charter member of Helms Foundation Hall of Fame; enshrined in Wisconsin Athletic Hall of Fame	
1961	(United States) Ed Wachter	C	Played 8 different leagues and with independent teams (1899–1924); Member Troy championship team in Hudson River (1910–11) and New York State Leagues (1912–13, 1915); credited by many with inventing the bounce pass; chosen All-America basketball center by leading basketball authorities of the era	
1962	(United States) Jack McCracken	F	Second place in National High School Tournament in Chicago (Classen High School, 1929); 8-time AAU All-America (1932, 1935, 1937–39, 1940, 1942, 1945); 3 AAU national titles (1937, 1939, 1942)	
1962	(United States) Pat Page	G	1 National AAU title (University of Chicago, 1907); 3 National championships (1908, 1909, 1910); Helms Foundation All-America (1908–10); Helms Foundation National Player of the Year (1910)	
1962	(United States) Barney Sedran	G	Shortest player to be inducted in the Hall of Fame; 1 Hudson Valley League championship (Newburgh, 1912); Pennsylvania League championship and 35 straight wins with Carbondale (1917); 1 New York State League championship (Albany, 1921)	
1962	(United States) John Thompson	F	All-America (Montana State, 1928–30); All-Rocky Mountain Conference (1928–30); led Montana State to Helms National Championship with 35–2 record (1929); Helms Foundation National Player of the Year (1930)	
1963	(United States) Robert Gruenig	C	AAU All-America First-Team (1937–40, 1942–46, 1948); AAU championship (Denver Safeway, 1937; Denver Nuggets, 1939; Denver American Legion, 1942)	
1964	(United States) Bud Foster	F	All-America (1930); Big Ten Conference titles (1935, 1941, 1947); NCAA Championship (Wisconsin, 1941)	
1964	(United States) Nat Holman	G	Eastern League championships (1921–22); player-coach of the Original Celtics (1926–29); American Basketball League titles (Original Celtics, 1927–28); NCAA and NIT championships as coach of City College of New York (CCNY) (1950)	
1964	(United States) John Russell	G	ABL championship as a player-coach (Cleveland Rosenblums, 1926); Eastern League championship (Trenton Moose, 1933); ABL championship (New York Jewels, 1939); played in the Interstate, New York State, Pennsylvania State, Metropolitan, and American Basketball Leagues	
1966	(United States) Joe Lapchick	C	Interstate League championship (Holyoke Reds, 1922); ABL championships (Original Celtics, 1927–28); American Basketball League titles (Cleveland Rosenblums, 1929–30); NIT championships as coach (St. John's, 1943–44, 1959, 1965)	
1969	(United States) Dutch Dehnert	F	Famed member of the Original Celtics of New York in the 1920s, also a successful pro coach.	
1970	(United States) Bob Davies	G-F	'The Harrisburg Houdini ', star ballhandling guard of the late 1940s and early 1950s. NBA All-Star for the Rochester Royals multiple times.	
1971	(United States) Bob Cousy	G	Star point guard for the Boston Celtics, known for passing and ballhandling. Six-time NBA champion as player (1957, 1959–1963); NBA Most Valuable Player (1957); 13-time NBA All-Star (1951–1963); eight-time NBA assists leader (1953–1960); member, NBA's 50th Anniversary All-Time Team; NCAA champion (Holy Cross, 1947).	
1971	(United States) Bob Pettit	F	Star NBA big man of the late 1950s and early 1960s, NBA Most Valuable Player, led 1958 Hawks to NBA title. The first NBA player to net 20,000 career points.	
1972	(United States) Paul Endacott	F	Helms Athletic Foundation Championship with Kansas, 1923; Helms Athletic Foundation Player of the Year, 1923; All-Missouri Valley Conference First-Team, 1922, 1923; All-Missouri Valley Conference Second-Team, 1921	
1972	(United States) Marty Friedman	G	Hudson River Valley League championship with Newburgh Tenths, 1911–12; World Championship with Utica Utes, 1914; Pennsylvania Inter-County championship with Carbondale, 1915; New York State League championship with Albany Senators, 1919	
1973	(United States) John Beckman	G	"Iron Man" and "Babe Ruth" of basketball in the 1920s. Member of the Original Celtics. Won Interstate League championships with Patterson, Bridgeport Blue Ribbons and Nanticoke Nans	
1973	(United States) Dolph Schayes	F-C	1950s NBA star for the Syracuse Nationals, led them to 1955 NBA title.	
1974	(United States) Ernest Schmidt	F	Central Conference leading scorer, 1931, 1932, 1933; All-America by College Humor Magazine,1932; AAU star with Reno Creameries and the Denver Piggly Wiggly team Second-Team AAU All-America, 1932	
1975	(United States) Joe Brennan	G	Metropolitan Basketball League championship with Brooklyn, 1922, 1924, 1925; National League championship with Brooklyn Visitations, 1927; Led Metropolitan Basketball League in scoring, 1922, 1927; Played in Eastern, New York State, Pennsylvania State, Interstate, Metropolitan, and American Basketball Leagues	
1975	(United States) Bill Russell	C	Summer Olympics Gold: 1956; 11× NBA Champion (1957, 1959–1966, 1968, 1969); 12× NBA All-Star(1958–1969); 5× NBA MVP (1958, '61, '62, '63, '65); 3× All-NBA First Team Selection (1959, 1963, 1965); 8× All-NBA Second Team Selection (1958, 1960–1962, 1964, 1966–1968); 1× NBA All-Defensive First Team Selection (1969); 50 Greatest Players in NBA History (1996); NBA 35th Anniversary Team (1980); NBA 25th Anniversary Team (1971); FIBA Hall of Fame (2007)	
1975	(United States) Robert Vandivier	G	State championships with Franklin High School, 1920–22; All-State at Franklin High School, 1920, 1921, 1922; Captain of The Wonder Five, Indiana's legendary high school team All Mid-West at Franklin College, 1926	
1976	(United States) Tom Gola	G-F	major college basketball star at LaSalle in the 1950s, then star 6' 6 guard -forward for the Philadelphia Warriors in late 1950s, early 1960s.	
1976	(United States) Ed Krause	C	Helms Foundation All-America at Notre Dame, 1932; Consensus Collegiate All-America, 1932, 1933, 1934; All-Western Conference, 1932, 1933, 1934; One of the first college players in history to average over ten points a game in a season, 1932–33	
1976	(United States) Bill Sharman	G	Star shooting guard for the Boston Celtics. Four-time NBA champion (1957, 1959–1961); eight-time NBA All-Star (1953–1960); member, NBA 50th Anniversary Team.	
1977	(United States) Elgin Baylor	F	Gravity-defying star forward for the Minneapolis-Los Angeles Lakers in the 1960s. NBA Rookie of the Year (1959); eleven-time NBA All-Star (1959–1965, 1967–1970); member, NBA 50th Anniversary All-Time Team.	
1977	(United States) Tarzan Cooper	C	2x World Professional Basketball Tournament winner	
1977	(United States) Lauren Gale	F	All Pacific Coast Conference First-Team, 1938, 1939; Led Pacific Coast Conference in scoring, 1938, 1939; Helms Athletic Foundation All-America, 1939; NCAA Championship with Oregon, 1939	
1977	(United States) William Johnson	C	First Team Big Six Conference at Kansas, 1932, 1933; Second Team Big Six Conference, 1931; College Humor All-America, 1933; Second Team AAU All-America, 1934	
1978	(United States) Paul Arizin	F	Line drive shooter, scoring star at Villanova, then for the Philadelphia Warriors in the 1950s, 'Pitchin Paul'.	
1978	(United States) Joe Fulks	F	The first Philadelphia Warriors NBA star, high scoring 6' 5 forward of the 1940s, the first major star of The Basketball Association Of America, the league that became the NBA in 1949.	
1978	(United States) Cliff Hagan	F	' Lil Abner ', remarkably tough 6' 5 forward, played college ball at Kentucky, star for the St. Louis Hawks, helped them win 1958 NBA title. Remarkable athlete, was player /coach for years, later played in the ABA in the late 1960s as well.	
1978	(United States) Jim Pollard	F	'Jumping Jim', college star at Stanford, high-leaping star forward for the Minneapolis Lakers in the 1950s. Five-time NBA champion (1949, 1950, 1952–1954); four-time NBA All-Star (1951, 1952, 1954, 1955); NCAA champion (Stanford, 1942).	
1979	(United States) Wilt Chamberlain	C	4× NBA Most Valuable Player (1960, 1966–1968); 2× NBA champion (1967, 1972); NBA Finals MVP (1972); 13× NBA All-Star (1960–1969, 1971–1973); NBA All-Star Game MVP (1960); 7× All-NBA First Team (1960–1962, 1964, 1965–1968); 3× All-NBA Second Team (1963, 1966, 1972); 2× NBA All-Defensive First Team (1972–1973); 7× NBA scoring champion (1960–1966); 11× NBA rebounding champion (1960–1963, 1966–1969, 1971–1973); NBA assists leader (1968)	
1980	(United States) Jerry Lucas	F-C	high school Ohio phenom, then led Ohio State to three NCAA Finals, star of 1960s USA Olympic team, all-pro big man for the Cincinnati Royals.	
1980	(United States) Oscar Robertson	PG	NBA Champion (1971); NBA Most Valuable Player (1964); 12× NBA All-Star (1961–1972); 9× All-NBA First Team (1961–1969); 2× All-NBA Second Team (1970–1971); NBA Rookie of the Year(1961); NBA 35th Anniversary Team (1980); 50 Greatest Players in NBA History (1996); FIBA Hall of Fame (2009); First NBA player to average a triple double in one full season (1962)	
1980	(United States) Jerry West	G	Star guard for the Los Angeles Lakers. One of the 50 Greatest Players in NBA History (1996); NBA Champion (1972); NBA Finals MVP (1969), the only player in history to receive the honor while playing on the losing team; 14-time NBA All-Star (1961–'74); NBA scoring champion (1970); selected an All-Star every year of his career; NBA 35th Anniversary Team (1980); appeared in the NBA Finals nine times; Olympic gold medalist (1960); the NBA league logo is modeled after West's silhouette.	
1981	(United States) Tom Barlow	C	Defeated Original Celtics and New York Rens as a member of Philadelphia SPHAS, 1926; Played in first professional game at the old Madison Square Garden; Played under Hall of Fame coach Eddie Gottlieb with Philadelphia SPHAS and Warriors; Known as basketball's first enforcer	
1982	(United States) Hal Greer	G	Star guard for Syracuse Nationals / Philadelphia 76ers with ten NBA All-Star selections, seven All-NBA Second Team selections and 21,586 points; 1967 NBA champion	
1982	(United States) Slater Martin	G	Star ball handler for the title-winning Minneapolis Lakers of the 1950s, then also the 1958 St. Louis Hawks.	
1982	(United States) Frank Ramsey	F-G	Star forward at Kentucky then for the Boston Celtics in the 1950s and 1960s; the first of Red Auerbach's "Sixth Man" stars.	
1982	(United States) Willis Reed	C	star big man who starred at Grambling, then for the New York Knickerbockers. Led Knicks to 1970 NBA title. Later also a pro coach.	
1983	(United States) Bill Bradley	F-G	Three-time All-American at Princeton (1963–65); Olympic gold medal (1964); USBWA College Player of the Year (1965); NCAA Tournament MOP (1965); Sullivan Award as top amateur athlete in the U.S. (1965); Rhodes Scholar; European Champions Cup (now EuroLeague) title with Simmenthal Milan (1966); two NBA titles (New York Knicks, 1970, 1973); first player ever to win Olympic gold medal, EuroLeague title, and NBA title	
1983	(United States) Dave DeBusschere	F	' Defensive Dave ', All-American for U. Of Detroit, then an NBA star for the Detroit Pistons and New York Knickerbockers. The youngest player / coach in NBA history for Detroit, age 24. Later, also commissioner of the ABA.	
1983	(United States) Jack Twyman	F	All-America at Cincinnati (1955); six-time NBA All-Star (1957–60, 1962–63); twice Second Team All-NBA (1960, 1962); among the NBA's top 15 scorers for eight seasons. Also known for serving as guardian of former teammate Maurice Stokes from his crippling head injury in 1958 until his death in 1970.	
1984	(United States) John Havlicek	F	' Hondo ', legendary basketball athlete, ' Sixth Man ' star for the title-winning Boston Celtics, then star forward as starter. Played 17 years, scored over 25,000 NBA points.	
1984	(United States) Sam Jones	G	Star shooting guard from small college in North Carolina; 10× NBA champion (1959, 1960, 1961, 1962, 1963, 1964, 1965, 1966, 1968, 1969).	
1985	(United States) Al Cervi	G-F	tough star guard for the Rochester Royals in the 1940s, then player / coach of Syracuse Nationals. Won championships with both teams.	
1985	(United States) Nate Thurmond	C-F	' Great Nate ' star center for the San Francisco Warriors in the 1960s, known for his defensive intensity. Finished career with the Cleveland Cavaliers.	
1986	(United States) Billy Cunningham	F	Star forward for the Philadelphia 76s, NBA All-Star (1969, 1970, 1971, 1972); ABA All-Star (1973); NBA Champion (1967, 1983); ABA MVP (1973)	
1986	(United States) Tom Heinsohn	F	8x NBA Champion (1957, 1959–65) 6x NBA All-Star (1957, 1961-1965) 4x All-NBA Second Team (1961-1964) 1957 NBA Rookie Of The Year Consensus First Team NCAA All-American (1956)	
1987	(United States) Rick Barry	F	NBA Champion (1975); 8× NBA All-Star (1966–1967, 1973–1978); 5× All-NBA First Team (1966–1967, 1974–1976); NBA Rookie of the Year (1966); NBA steals leader 50 Greatest Players in NBA History (1996)	
1987	(United States) Walt Frazier	G	' Clyde ', legendary quick-handed star guard for the New York Knickerbockers in the 1970s.	
1987	(United States) Bob Houbregs	C-F	Helms Foundation Player of the Year, 1953; All-America, 1953; All-Pacific Coast Conference, 1951–1953; Led Washington to PCC titles, 1951–1953	
1987	(United States) Pete Maravich	G	NCAA Division I All-Time Leading Scorer 5x NBA All-Star (1973, 1974, 1977-1979) 2x All-NBA First Team (1976, 1977) 2x All-NBA Second Team (1973, 1978) NBA Scoring Champion (1977) 2x National College Player Of The Year (1969, 1970) 3x Consensus NCAA First Team All-American (1968-1970)	
1987	(United States) Bobby Wanzer	G	NBA championship with Rochester Royals, 1951; Led the league in free-throw percentage, 90.4 in 1952; NBA All-Star, 1952–56; NBA Most Valuable Player, 1953	
1988	(United States) Clyde Lovellette	C-F	Star big man of the 1950s, for Kansas as collegian, Phillips 66ers in the NIBL, then for four NBA teams.	
1988	(United States) Bobby McDermott	G	Star scoring guard and player coach for the Fort Wayne Zollner Pistons during The Wars Years of the 1940s.	
1988	(United States) Wes Unseld	C-F	NBA MVP (1969) NBA Champion (1978) NBA Finals MVP (1978) 5x NBA All-Star	
1989	(United States) William Gates	F	Two-time World Professional Tournament championship with New York Rens (1939) and Washington Bears (1943); Played under Hall of Fame coach Bob Douglas; Only player to have appeared in all ten World Professional Tournaments. First African-American player-coach in major leagues with the 1948–49 Dayton Rens of the NBL	
1989	(United States) K.C. Jones	G	NCAA championship with USF, 1955, 1956; U.S. Olympic Gold Medal, 1956; AAU All-America, 1957–58; NBA championships with Boston Celtics, 1959–66	
1989	(United States) Lenny Wilkens	G	Called ' Lefty ' as star passing /scoring guard player for St. Louis Hawks, Seattle SuperSonics and Cleveland Cavaliers. Then became outstanding pro coach for two of those teams. Had two Hall Of Fame careers, one as player, one as coach.	
1990	(United States) Dave Bing	G	All-America at Syracuse University, 1966; NBA All-Star, 1968–69, 1971–76; All-NBA First-Team, 1968, 1971; NBA 50th Anniversary All-Time Team, 1996	
1990	(United States) Elvin Hayes	F-C	' The Big E ', high leaping, scoring big man at U. Of Houston, then for San Diego-Houston Rockets. Later also starred for title-winning Washington Bullets in lengthy NBA career.	
1990	(United States) Neil Johnston	C	high scoring center at Ohio State as collegian, then for Philadelphia Warriors in the 1950s. Led the Warriors to 1956 NBA title.	
1990	(United States) Earl Monroe	G	' Earl The Pearl ', playground legend from Philadelphia, then crowd pleasing / scoring star for Baltimore Bullets and New York Knickerbockers.	
1991	(United States) Nate Archibald	G	NBA Champion (1981); 6× NBA All-Star (1973, 1975–1976, 1980–1982); 3× All-NBA First Team (1973, 1975–1976); 2× All-NBA Second Team (1972, 1981); 50 Greatest Players in NBA History (1996)	
1991	(United States) Dave Cowens	C-F	high intensity big man / center for the Boston Celtics, helped lead team to two NBA titles.	
1991	(United States) Harry Gallatin	F-C	NBA All-Star, 1951–57; All-NBA First-Team, 1954; All-NBA Second-Team, 1955; NBA Coach of the Year with St. Louis, 1963	
1992	(Soviet Union) Sergei Belov	G	First international player to be inducted With the Soviet national team; 4× EuroBasket Gold: 1967, 1969, 1971, 1979; EuroBasket MVP 1969; 2× FIBA World Championship Gold: 1967, 1974; FIBA World Championship MVP 1970; Summer Olympics Gold: 1972; With CSKA Moscow; 11× USSR League champion: 1969, 1970, 1971, 1972, 1973, 1974, 1976, 1977, 1978, 1979, 1980; 2× USSR Cup winner: 1972, 1973; 2 EuroLeague champion 1969, 1971; FIBA's 50 Greatest Players 1991; FIBA Hall of Fame 2007; 50 Greatest EuroLeague Contributors 2008	
1992	(United States) Lusia Harris-Stewart	C	AIAW National Championship with Delta State, 1975–77; All-America at Delta State, 1975–77; Pan American Gold Medal, 1975; Olympic Silver Medal, 1976	
1992	(United States) Connie Hawkins	F-C	' The Hawk ' playground legend, high-gliding star big man from Brooklyn. Career marred by alleged point-shaving scandal. Nonetheless starred for Harlem Globetrotters, ABL-ABA Pittsburgh Pipers, which he led to the first ABA title in 1968.	
1992	(United States) Bob Lanier	C	All-America at St. Bonaventure University, 1968, 1969, 1970; NCAA Final Four, 1970; Eight-time NBA All-Star, 1972–75, 1977–79, 1982; NBA's Walter J. Kennedy Citizenship Award, 1978	
1992	(United States) Nera White	F	Led Nashville Business College to ten national AAU championships Named Outstanding Player in national AAU tournaments ten times MVP, World Championship, 1957–58; Led U.S. to World Championship, 1957–58	
1993	(United States) Walt Bellamy	C	Summer Olympics Gold: 1960; 4× NBA-All Star (1962–1965); NBA Rookie of the Year (1962)	
1993	(United States) Julius Erving	F	NBA Champion (1983); 2× ABA Champion (1974, 1976); NBA MVP (1981); 3× ABA MVP (1974–1976); 11× NBA All-Star (1977–1987); 5× ABA All-Star (1972–1976); 5× All-NBA First Team (1978, 1980–1983); 50 Greatest Players in NBA History (1996)	
1993	(United States) Dan Issel	C-F	Odds-defying star big man at Kentucky, then for ABA Kentucky Colonels, then for ABA/NBA Denver Nuggets in lengthy playing career. Later also coached Denver. Netted over 25,000 pro points.	
1993	(United States) Dick McGuire	G	NIT championship at St. John's, 1944; Helms Foundation All-America at St. John's, 1944; NCAA Final Four at Dartmouth, 1944; NBA All-Star, 1951, 1952, 1954–56, 1958–59	
1993	(United States) Ann Meyers	G	Olympic Silver Medal, 1976; All-America at UCLA, 1976–78; AIAW National Championship, 1978; Broderick Cup, symbolic of nation's outstanding female player, 1978, FIBA Hall of Fame (2007)	
1993	(United States) Calvin Murphy	G	NBA All-Star (1979); NBA All-Rookie First Team (1971); J. Walter Kennedy Citizenship Award (1979); 2× Consensus NCAA All-American First Team (1969–1970); Consensus NCAA All-American Second Team (1968)	
1993	(Soviet Union) Uļjana Semjonova	C	Unbeaten in international team competition in her 18-year career; two Olympic gold medals (1976, 1980); three World Championship gold medals (1971, 1975, 1983); 11 European Women's Championships; 16 European women's club championships; 15 Soviet club championships; member of the inaugural class of inductees to the Women's Basketball Hall of Fame in 1999; inducted into the FIBA Hall of Fame in 2007	
1993	(United States) Bill Walton	C	2× NBA Champion (1977, 1986); NBA Most Valuable Player (1978); 2× NBA All-Star (1977–1978); NBA Finals MVP (1977); All-NBA First Team (1978); All-NBA Second Team (1977); 2× NBA All-Defensive First Team (1977–1978); NBA Sixth Man of the Year (1986); 50 Greatest Players in NBA History (1996)	
1994	(United States) Carol Blazejowski	G	All-America at Montclair State, 1976–78; Led Montclair State to AIAW Final Four, 1976; Converse Women's Player of the Year, 1977; Gold medal, World University team, 1979	
1994	(United States) Buddy Jeannette	G	World Professional Tournament Championship with Detroit Eagles, 1941; World Professional Tournament MVP, 1941, 1945; All-NBL First-Team, 1941, 1944–46; All-BAA Second-Team, 1942	
1995	(United States) Kareem Abdul-Jabbar	C	6× NBA Champion (1971, 1980, 1982, 1985, 1987–1988); 6× NBA Most Valuable Player (1971–1972, 1974, 1976–1977, 1980); 19× NBA All-Star (1970–1977, 1979–1989); 2× NBA Finals MVP (1971, 1985); 10× All-NBA First Team (1971–1974, 1976–1977, 1980–1981, 1984, 1986); 5× All-NBA Second Team (1970, 1978–1979, 1983, 1985); 5× NBA All-Defensive First Team (1974–1975, 1979–1981); 6× NBA All-Defensive Second Team (1970–1971, 1976–1978, 1984); NBA Rookie of the Year (1970); NBA All-Rookie Team (1970); 2× NBA scoring champion NBA rebounding champion 4× NBA blocks leader 50 Greatest Players in NBA History (1996); 3× NCAA Men's Basketball Champion (1967–1969); 3× NCAA basketball tournament Most Outstanding Player (1967–1969); Naismith College Player of the Year (1969); 2× USBWA College Player of the Year (1967–1968)	
1995	(United States) Anne Donovan	C	AIAW Championship with Old Dominion University, 1979; All-America, 1981–83; NCAA Final Four with Old Dominion University, 1983; Naismith Player of the Year, 1983; Olympic Gold Medal (1984, 1988), FIBA Hall of Fame (2015)	
1995	(United States) Vern Mikkelsen	F-C	NAIA national championship at Hamline, 1949; All-America, 1949; Six-time NBA All-Star, 1951–53, 1955–57; NBA championships with Minneapolis Lakers, 1951–53, 1955	
1995	(United States) Cheryl Miller	F	NCAA Championship with Southern California, 1983, 1984; NCAA tournament MVP, 1983; Naismith Player of the Year, 1984–86; Olympic Gold Medal, 1984, FIBA Hall of Fame (2010)	
1996	(Socialist Federal Republic of Yugoslavia) Krešimir Ćosić	C	2× EuroBasket MVP: 1971, 1975; 2× FIBA World Championship Gold: 1970, 1978; 3× EuroBasket Gold: 1973, 1975, 1977; Summer Olympics Gold: 1980; Croatian Sportsman of the Year 1980; FIBA's 50 Greatest Players 1991; National Collegiate Basketball Hall of Fame 2006; FIBA Hall of Fame 2007; 50 Greatest EuroLeague Contributors 2008	
1996	(United States) George Gervin	G	9× NBA All-Star (1977–1985); NBA All-Star Game MVP (1980); 5× All-NBA First Team (1978–1982); 2× All-NBA Second Team (1977, 1983); 3× ABA All-Star (1974–1976); 2× All-ABA Second Team (1975–1976); ABA All-Rookie Team (1973); ABA All-Time Team; 50 Greatest Players in NBA History (1996)	
1996	(United States) Gail Goodrich	G	NBA Champion (1972); 5× NBA All-Star (1969, 1972–1975)	
1996	(United States) Nancy Lieberman	G	All-America at Old Dominion, 1978, 1979, 1980; Olympic Silver Medal, 1976; Pan American Gold Medal, 1975; Became first female player in history to play in a men's league with the USBL Springfield Fame, 1986	
1996	(United States) David Thompson	G-F	4× NBA All-Star (1977–1979, 1983); ABA All-Star (1976); 2× All-NBA First Team (1977, 1978); NBA All-Star Game MVP (1979); ABA All-Star Game MVP (1976); All-ABA Second Team (1976); ABA Rookie of the Year (1976); ABA All-Rookie First Team (1976); Naismith College Player of the Year (1975); Adolph Rupp Trophy (1975); ABA All-Time Team	
1996	(United States) George Yardley	F-G	' Jumping George ', high-leaping star scoring forward at Stanford as collegian, then for the Fort Wayne – Detroit Pistons in the 1950s.	
1997	(United States) Joan Crawford	C	Gold Medals in 1957 FIBA World Championship and 1959 & 1963 Pan American Games for Women's Basketball. 2× AAU Most Valuable Player. AAU Hall of Fame in 1961. Helms Hall of Fame in 1967. Women's Basketball Hall of Fame in 1999.	
1997	(United States) Denise Curry	F	Gold Medals in 1979 & 1983 FIBA World Championship, 1983 Pan American Games and 1984 Olympics for Women's Basketball. UCLA Athletics Hall of Fame in 1994. Women's Basketball Hall of Fame in 1999.	
1997	(United States) Alex English	F	8× NBA All-Star (1982–1989); 3× All-NBA Second Team (1982–1983, 1986); J. Walter Kennedy Citizenship Award (1988); NBA Scoring Champion (1983)	
1997	(United States) Bailey Howell	F	2× NBA Champion (1968–1969); 6× NBA All-Star (1961–1964, 1966–1967); All-NBA Second Team (1963)	
1998	(United States) Larry Bird	F	Summer Olympics Gold: 1992; 3× NBA Champion (1981, 1984, 1986); 3× NBA Most Valuable Player (1984–1986); 12× NBA All-Star (1980–1988, 1990–1992); 2× NBA Finals MVP (1984, 1986); 9× All-NBA First Team (1980–1988); All-NBA Second Team (1990); 3× NBA All-Defensive Second Team (1982–1984); NBA Rookie of the Year (1980); NBA All-Rookie Team (1980); 50 Greatest Players in NBA History (1996); AP Athlete of the Year (1986); Member of the "Dream Team" inducted as a unit in 2010	
1998	(United States) Marques Haynes	G	Harlem Globetrotters' premiere ball handler	
1998	(United States) Arnie Risen	C	2× NBA Champion (1951, 1957); 4× NBA All-Star (1952–55); 9× All-BAA Second Team (1949)	
1999	(United States) Kevin McHale	F	3× NBA Champion (1981, 1984, 1986); 7× NBA All-Star (1984, 1986–1991); 2× NBA Sixth Man of the Year (1984–1985); All-NBA First Team (1987); 3× NBA All-Defensive First Team (1986–1988); 3× NBA All-Defensive Second Team (1983, 1990–1991); NBA All-Rookie Team (1981); Pan American Games Gold: 1979; 50 Greatest Players in NBA History (1996)	
2000	(United States) Bob McAdoo	C-F	2× NBA Champion (1982, 1985); NBA Most Valuable Player (1975); 2× FIBA European Champions Cup (EuroLeague) champion (1987, 1988); EuroLeague Final Four MVP (1988); 5× NBA All-Star (1974–1978); All-NBA First Team (1975); All-NBA Second Team (1974); NBA Rookie of the Year (1973); NBA All-Rookie Team (1973)	
2000	(United States) Isiah Thomas	G	2× NBA Champion (1989–1990); 12× NBA All-Star (1982–1993); NBA Finals MVP (1990); 3× All-NBA First Team (1984–1986); 2× All-NBA Second Team (1983, 1987); 3× NBA All-Defensive First Team (1986–1988); NBA All-Rookie Team (1982); USA Basketball Male Athlete of the Year (1980); Pan American Games Gold: 1979; 50 Greatest Players in NBA History (1996)	
2001	(United States) Moses Malone	C	NBA Champion (1983); 3× NBA Most Valuable Player (1979, 1982–1983); 13× NBA All-Star (1975, 1978–1989); NBA Finals MVP (1983); 4× All-NBA First Team (1979, 1982–1983, 1985); 4× All-NBA Second Team (1980–1981, 1984, 1987); NBA All-Defensive First Team (1983); NBA All-Defensive Second Team (1979); 50 Greatest Players in NBA History (1996)	
2002	(United States) Magic Johnson	G	Summer Olympics Gold: 1992; NCAA Champion (Michigan State, 1979); NCAA Tournament Most Outstanding Player; 12× NBA All-Star (1979); 5× NBA Champion (1980,1982,1985,1987,1988); 3× NBA Finals MVP (1980, 1982, 1987); 3× NBA MVP (1987,1989,1990); 9× All-NBA First Team; All-NBA Second Team; 4× NBA assists leader 2× NBA steals leader NBA All-Rookie Team (1980); Member of the "Dream Team" inducted as a unit in 2010; 50 Greatest Players in NBA History (1996)	
2002	(Socialist Federal Republic of Yugoslavia) (Croatia) Dražen Petrović	G	FIBA World Championship Gold: 1990; EuroBasket Gold: 1989; 3× Olympic Medalist ( Silver silver, SFR Yugoslavia, 1988, Croatia, 1992; Bronze bronze, SFR Yugoslavia, 1984); 2× EuroLeague champion (1985, 1986); 2× European Cup Winners' Cup Winner (1987, 1989); FIBA World Championship MVP (1986); EuroBasket MVP (1989); 4× Euroscar (1986, 1989, 1992, 1993); 2× Mr. Europa (1986, 1993); FIBA's 50 Greatest Players in 1991; All-NBA Third Team (1993); FIBA Hall of Fame (2007)	
2003	(Italy) Dino Meneghin	C	EuroBasket Gold: 1983; Summer Olympics Silver: 1980; 7× EuroLeague champion (1970, 1972, 1973, 1975, 1976, 1987, 1988); 2× European Cup Winners' Cup Winner (1967, 1980); Korać Cup Winner (1985); Euroscar (1983); 2× Mr. Europa (1980, 1983); 12× Italian League Champion (1969, 1970, 1971, 1973, 1974, 1977, 1978, 1982, 1985, 1986, 1987, 1989); 6× Italian Cup Winner (1969, 1970, 1971, 1973, 1986, 1987); FIBA's 50 Greatest Players in 1991; Italian Basketball Hall of Fame (2006); 50 Greatest EuroLeague Contributors (2008); FIBA Hall of Fame (2010)	
2003	(United States) Robert Parish	C	4× NBA Champion (1981, 1984, 1986, 1997); 9× NBA All-Star (1981–1987, 1990–1991); All-NBA Second Team (1982); All-NBA Third Team (1987); 50 Greatest Players in NBA History (1996)	
2003	(United States) James Worthy	F	3× NBA Champion (1985, 1987–1988); 7× NBA All-Star (1986–1992); NBA Finals MVP (1988); 2× All-NBA Third Team (1990–1991); NBA All-Rookie Team (1983); 50 Greatest Players in NBA History (1996)	
2004	(Socialist Federal Republic of Yugoslavia) Dražen Dalipagić	F	FIBA World Championship Gold: 1978; 3× EuroBasket Gold: 1973, 1975, 1977; Summer Olympics Gold: 1980; FIBA Korać Cup Winner (1978); FIBA World Cup MVP (1978); EuroBasket MVP (1977); 2× Mr. Europa (1977, 1978); The Best Athlete of Yugoslavia (1978); Yugoslav Sportsman of the Year (1978); Euroscar (1980); FIBA's 50 Greatest Players in 1991; FIBA Hall of Fame (2007)	
2004	(United States) Clyde Drexler	G	1× NBA Champion (Houston Rockets, 1995); Summer Olympics Gold: 1992; 10× NBA All-Star (1986, 1988–1993, 1994, 1996, 1997); 1× All-NBA First Team Selection (1992); 2× All-NBA Second Team Selection (1988, 1991); 2× All-NBA Third Team Selection (1990, 1995) member of the "Dream Team" inducted as a unit in 2010; 50 Greatest Players in NBA History (1996)	
2004	(United States) Maurice Stokes	F-C	3× NBA All-Star(1956–58); 3× All-NBA Second Team Selection (1956–58); NBA Rookie of the Year (1956)	
2004	(United States) Lynette Woodard	G	Gold Medalist in 1984 Olympics and 1990 FIBA World Championship for Women. Inducted to Women's Basketball Hall of Fame in 2005.	
2005	(Brazil) Hortencia de Fatima Marcari	G	First played on the Brazil national team at age 15; gold medals at the 1991 Pan American Games and 1994 FIBA World Championship for Women; silver medal at the 1996 Olympics; four wins in the South American Championships; inducted into the Women's Basketball Hall of Fame in 2002 and the FIBA Hall of Fame in 2007	
2006	(United States) Charles Barkley	F	2× Summer Olympics Gold: 1992, 1996; NBA Most Valuable Player (1993); FIBA Americas Championship Gold: 1992; 11× NBA All-Star (1987–1997); 5× All-NBA First Team (1988–1991, 1993); 5× All-NBA Second Team (1986–1987, 1992, 1994–1995); All-NBA Third Team (1996); NBA All-Rookie Team (1985); NBA All-Star Game MVP (1991); 50 Greatest Players in NBA History (1996) member of the "Dream Team" inducted as a unit in 2010	
2006	(United States) Joe Dumars	G	2× NBA Champion (1989–1990); NBA Finals MVP (1989); 6× NBA All-Star (1990–1993, 1995, 1997); All-NBA Second Team (1993); 2× All-NBA Third Team (1990–1991); 4× NBA All-Defensive First Team (1989–1990, 1992–1993); NBA All-Defensive Second Team (1991); NBA All-Rookie Team (1986); FIBA Basketball World Cup Gold: (1994)	
2006	(United States) Dominique Wilkins	F	EuroLeague Champion (1996); 9× NBA All Star (1986–1994); NBA scoring champion (1986); All-NBA First Team (1986); 4× All-NBA Second Team (1987–1988, 1991, 1993); 2× All-NBA Third Team (1989, 1994); Greek Cup Winner (1996); Greek Cup MVP (1996); EuroLeague Final Four MVP (1996); NBA All-Rookie Team (1983); FIBA Basketball World Cup Gold: (1994)	
2008	(United States) Adrian Dantley	F	6× NBA All-Star (1980–1982, 1984–1986); 2× All-NBA Second Team (1981,1984); NBA Rookie of the Year (1977); NBA All-Rookie First Team (1977)	
2008	(Jamaica) (United States) Patrick Ewing	C	2× Summer Olympics Gold: 1984, 1992; FIBA Americas Championship Gold: 1992; 11× NBA All-Star (1986, 1988–1997); All-NBA First Team (1990); 6× All-NBA Second Team (1988–1989, 1991–1993, 1997); 3× NBA All-Defensive Second Team (1988–1989, 1992); NBA Rookie of the Year (1986); NBA All-Rookie First Team (1986); NCAA Men's Basketball Champion (1984); NCAA basketball tournament Most Outstanding Player (1984); Naismith College Player of the Year (1985); Adolph Rupp Trophy (1985); Member of the "Dream Team" inducted as a unit in 2010; 50 Greatest Players in NBA History	
2008	(Nigeria) (United States) Hakeem Olajuwon	C	2× NBA Champion (1994, 1995); Summer Olympics Gold: 1996; NBA MVP (1994); 12× NBA All-Star (1985–1990, 1992–1997); 2× NBA Finals MVP (1994, 1995); 2× NBA Defensive Player of the Year (1993–1994); 6× All-NBA First Team Selection (1987–1989, 1993–1994, 1997); 3× All-NBA Second Team Selection (1986, 1990, 1996); 3× All-NBA Third Team Selection (1991, 1995, 1999); 5× NBA All-Defensive First Team Selection (1987–1988, 1990, 1993–1994); 4× NBA All-Defensive Second Team Selection (1985, 1991, 1996–1997); 2× NBA rebounding leader (1989, 1990); 3× NBA blocks leader (1990, 1991, 1993); NBA All-Rookie Team (1985); 50 Greatest Players in NBA History; FIBA Hall of Fame (2016)	
2009	(United States) Michael Jordan	G	6× NBA Champion (1991–1993, 1996–1998); 5× NBA MVP (1988, 1991–92, 1996, 1998); 14× NBA All-Star (1985–1993, 1996–1998, 2002–2003); 6× NBA Finals MVP (all-time record)(1991–93, 1996–98); 10× All-NBA First Team Selection (1987–1993, 1996–1998); 9× NBA All-Defensive First Team Selection (1988–1993, 1996–1998); 1× NBA Defensive Player of the Year (1988); NBA All-Rookie First Team (1985); NBA Rookie of the Year (1985); 10× NBA Season Scoring Title (all-time record)(1987–1993, 1996–1998); 3× NBA Season Steals Leader (1988, 1990, 1993); NCAA Men's Basketball Champion (1982); Naismith Award (1984); 2× Summer Olympics Gold: 1984, 1992; FIBA Americas Championship Gold: 1992; Pan American Games Gold: 1983; 2× USA Basketball Male Athlete of the Year (1983, 1984); Member of the "Dream Team" inducted as a unit in 2010; 50 Greatest Players in NBA History; FIBA Hall of Fame (2015)	
2009	(United States) David Robinson	C	2× NBA Champion (1999, 2003); 1× NBA MVP (1995); 10× NBA All-Star (1990–96, 1998, 2000–01); 4× All-NBA First Team Selection (1991–92, 1995–96); 2× All-NBA Second Team Selection (1994, 1998); 4× All-NBA Third Team Selection (1990, 1993, 2000–01); 1× NBA Defensive Player of the Year (1992); 4× NBA All-Defensive First Team Selection (1991–92, 1995–96); 4× NBA All-Defensive Second Team Selection (1990, 1993–94, 1998); NBA Rookie of the Year (1990); NBA All-Rookie First Team (1990); 3× Summer Olympics Gold: 1992, 1996 Bronze: 1988; FIBA Basketball World Cup Gold: (1986); Pan American Games Silver: 1987; USA Basketball Male Athlete of the Year (1986); Member of the "Dream Team" inducted as a unit in 2010; 50 Greatest Players in NBA History (1996); FIBA Hall of Fame (2013)	
2009	(United States) John Stockton	G	10× NBA All-Star (1989–1997, 2000); 2× All-NBA First Team Selection; 6× All-NBA Second Team Selection; 3× All-NBA Third Team Selection; 5× NBA All-Defensive Second Team Selection; 9× NBA assists leader 2× NBA steals leader NBA All-Star MVP (1993); 2× Summer Olympics Gold: 1992, 1996; Member of the "Dream Team" inducted as a unit in 2010; 50 Greatest Players in NBA History; All-time leader in assists All-time leader in steals	
2010	(United States) Cynthia Cooper-Dyke	G	2× NCAA Champion (USC, 1983, 1984); Olympic gold medal (1988); 4× WNBA Champion (Houston Comets, 1997–2000); 2× WNBA MVP (1997, 1998); 3× WNBA All-Star (1999, 2000, 2003); 3× WNBA Scoring Leader (1997–1999)	
2010	(United States) Dennis Johnson	G	5× NBA All-Star (1979–82, 1985); All-NBA First Team (1979), NBA Finals MVP (1979); 6× NBA All-Defensive First Team (1979–83, 1987); 3× NBA Champion (Seattle SuperSonics, 1979; Boston Celtics, 1984, 1986)	
2010	(United States) Gus Johnson	F	5× NBA All-Star (1965, 1968–71); 4× All-NBA Second Team (1965–66, 1970–71); 2× NBA All-Defensive First Team (1970–71); NBA All-Rookie First Team (1964); ABA Champion (Indiana Pacers, 1973)	
2010	(United States) Karl Malone	F	14× NBA All-Star (1988–1998, 2000–2002); 2× NBA MVP (1997, 1999); 11× All-NBA First Team Selection (1989–1999); 2× All-NBA Second Team Selection (1988, 2000); 1× All-NBA Third Team Selection (2001); 3× NBA All-Defensive First Team Selection (1997–1999); 1× NBA All-Defensive Second Team Selection (1988); NBA All-Rookie Team (1986); 2× NBA All-Star MVP (1989, 1993); 50 Greatest Players in NBA History (1996); 2× Summer Olympics Gold: 1992, 1996; Member of the "Dream Team" inducted as a unit in 2010	
2010	(Brazil) Ubiratan Pereira Maciel	C	Known as O Rei (The King) in his homeland of Brazil; represented Brazil in four Summer Olympics, winning a bronze medal in 1964; gold medalist at 1963 FIBA World Championship and 1971 Pan American Games; 5-time gold medalist at the FIBA South American Championship (1963, 1968, 1971, 1973, 1977); 5× Brazilian Championship champion (1965, 1966, 1969, 1977, 1981); FIBA Order of Merit (1994); FIBA's 50 Greatest Players in 1991; FIBA Hall of Fame (2009)	
2010	(United States) Scottie Pippen	F	6× NBA Champion (1991–1993, 1996–1998); 7× NBA All-Star (1990, 1992–1997); 1× NBA All-Star Game MVP (1994); 3× All-NBA First Team Selection (1994–1996); 2× All-NBA Second Team Selection (1992, 1997); 2× All-NBA Third Team Selection (1993, 1998); 8× NBA All-Defensive First Team Selection (1992–1999); 2× NBA All-Defensive Second Team Selection (1991, 2000); NBA steals leader 50 Greatest Players in NBA History (1996); 2× Summer Olympics Gold: 1992, 1996; USA Basketball Male Athlete of the Year (1996); Member of the "Dream Team" inducted as a unit in 2010	
2011	(United States) Dennis Rodman	F	5× NBA Champion (1989–1990, 1996–1998); 2× NBA Defensive Player of the Year (1990–1991); 2× NBA All-Star (1990, 1992); 2× All-NBA Third Team (1992, 1995); 7× NBA All-Defensive First Team (1989–1993, 1995–1996); NBA All-Defensive Second Team (1994); 7× NBA Rebounding Champion (1991–98)	
2011	(United States) Chris Mullin	F	5× NBA All-Star (1989–1993); All-NBA First Team (1992); 2× All-NBA Second Team (1989, 1991); All-NBA Third Team (1990); 2× Summer Olympics Gold: 1984, 1992; Pan American Games Gold: 1983; Member of the "Dream Team" inducted as a unit in 2010; 1× USBWA College Player of the Year (1985); John R. Wooden Award (1985)	
2011	(Soviet Union) (Lithuania) Arvydas Sabonis	C	3× Summer Olympic Medalist ( Gold, USSR, 1988; Bronze, Lithuania, 1992 and 1996); 2× FIBA Basketball World Cup medalist Gold: 1982 Silver: 1986; 4× EuroBasket medalist Gold: 1985 Silver: 1995, Bronze: 1983, 1989; EuroBasket MVP (1985); 2× Spanish ACB League MVP (1994, 1995); 2× Spanish ACB League Finals MVP (1993, 1994); EuroLeague Final Four MVP (1995); NBA All-Rookie First Team (1996); EuroLeague Regular Season and Top 16 MVP (regular season and Top 16 phases, 2004); 6× Euroscar (1984, 1985, 1988, 1995, 1997, 1999); 2× Mr. Europa (1985, 1997); FIBA's 50 Greatest Players in 1991; 50 Greatest EuroLeague Contributors (2008); FIBA Hall of Fame (2010)	
2011	(United States) Artis Gilmore	C	ABA All-Time Team (1997); ABA MVP (1972); ABA Rookie of the Year (1972); 5× ABA All-Star (1972–76); 5× All-ABA First Team (1972–76); 5× ABA All-Defensive First Team (1972–76); ABA All-Star Game MVP (1974); ABA Playoff MVP (1975); 6× NBA All-Star (1978, 1979, 1981–83, 1986); NBA All-Defensive Second Team (1978); NBA career leader in field goal percentage	
2011	(United States) Teresa Edwards	G	5× Olympic Medalist (gold, 1984, 1988, 1996, 2000; bronze, 1992); Inductee, Women's Basketball Hall of Fame (2010); NCAA Silver Anniversary Award (2011), FIBA Hall of Fame (2013)	
2011	(United States) Goose Tatum	F	Member of the Harlem Globetrotters inducted as a unit in 2002	
2012	(United States) Mel Daniels	C	ABA Rookie of the Year (1968); 2× ABA Most Valuable Player (1969, 1971); 3× ABA champion (Indiana Pacers, 1970, 1972, 1973); 7× ABA All-Star	
2012	(United States) Katrina McClain	F	2× Kodak All-America (Georgia, 1986, 1987); WBCA Player of the Year (1987); 2× Olympic gold medalist with Team USA (1988, 1996); 2× World Championship gold medalist (1986, 1990); 2× USA Basketball Female Athlete of the Year	
2012	(United States) Reggie Miller	G	Retired with the most three-point field goals in NBA history (2,560); 5× NBA All-Star; 3× All-NBA Third Team; J. Walter Kennedy Citizenship Award (2004); FIBA Basketball World Cup Gold: 1994; Summer Olympics Gold: 1996; USA Basketball Male Athlete of the Year (2002)	
2012	(United States) Ralph Sampson	C	3× Naismith Award (Virginia, 1981, 1982, 1983); 2× Wooden Award (1982, 1983); 3× consensus first-team All-American (1981–1983); 4× NBA All-Star; NBA All-Star Game MVP (1985)	
2012	(United States) Chet Walker	F	Consensus first-team All-America (Bradley, 1962); NBA All-Rookie Team (1963); 7× NBA All-Star; NBA champion (Philadelphia 76ers, 1967)	
2012	(United States) Jamaal Wilkes	F	3× Academic All-America (UCLA, 1972, 1973, 1974); Consensus first-team All-American (1974); NBA Rookie of the Year (1975); 3× NBA All-Star; No. 52 retired by Los Angeles Lakers; 4× NBA champion (Golden State Warriors, 1975; Los Angeles Lakers, 1980, 1982, 1985)	
2013	(United States) Roger Brown	G-F	ABA Playoffs MVP (1970); 4× ABA All-Star; All-ABA First Team (1971); 3× ABA champion (Indiana Pacers, 1970, 1972, 1973)	
2013	(United States) Bernard King	F	4× NBA All Star; 2× All-NBA First Team; NBA scoring champion (1985); NBA All-Rookie Team	
2013	(United States) Gary Payton	G	NBA champion (Miami Heat, 2006); 9× NBA All-Star; 2× All-NBA First Team; NBA Defensive Player of the Year; 9× NBA All-Defensive First Team; NBA steals leader 2× Summer Olympics Gold: 1996, 2000; 2× FIBA Americas Championship Gold (1999), Silver (1989)	
2013	(United States) Richie Guerin	G	6× NBA All-Star; 3× All-NBA Second Team	
2013	(United States) Dawn Staley	G	2× Naismith Award (Virginia, 1991, 1992); 6× WNBA All-Star; 2× ABL All-Star; 3× Olympic Gold Medalist (1996, 2000, 2004)	
2013	(Brazil) Oscar Schmidt	F	All-time Top Scorer in FIBA World Cup basketball history All-time Top Scorer in Summer Olympic Games history 3× Summer Olympic Games Top Scorer (1988, 1992, 1996); 1× FIBA World Cup Top Scorer (1990); 16× Top Scorer in national domestic leagues (8× in Brazil, 7× in Italy, 1× in Spain); Gold Medalist at the Pan American Games (1987); Longest professional career for a basketball player (29 years); FIBA's 50 Greatest Players (1991); FIBA Hall of Fame (2010); Italian Basketball Hall of Fame (2017)	
2014	(United States) Nathaniel "Sweetwater" Clifton	F	First African American player to sign an NBA contract who caught on with a team; one-time NBA All-Star (1957); also played with two Hall of Fame teams in the New York Renaissance and Harlem Globetrotters; 1978 inductee in the Black Athletes Hall of Fame	
2014	(Soviet Union) (Lithuania) Šarūnas Marčiulionis	G	3× Summer Olympics medalist ( Gold with the Soviet Union in 1988, Bronze with Lithuania in 1992 and 1996); 3× EuroBasket medalist Silver: 1987, 1995, Bronze: 1989; EuroBasket MVP (1995); Mr. Europa (1988); 4× Lithuanian Sportsman of the Year (1987, 1989, 1990, 1991); FIBA's 50 Greatest Players (1991); Pioneer of European players in the NBA; Resurrected the Lithuania national team after Lithuania's return to independence in 1990; Founder of the top-tier level Lithuanian League, the LKL; FIBA Hall of Fame (2015)	
2014	(United States) Alonzo Mourning	C	Summer Olympics Gold: 2000; 2× FIBA Basketball World Cup medalist Gold: 1994 Bronze: 1990; Consensus First Team All-American (Georgetown, 1992); Consensus Second Team All-American (1990); Third-team All-American – NABC (1991); 7× NBA All-Star (1994–1997, 2000–2002); All-NBA First Team (1999); All-NBA Second Team (2000); 2× NBA Defensive Player of the Year (1999, 2000); 2× NBA All-Defensive First Team (1999–2000); 2× NBA blocks leader (1999–2000); NBA All-Rookie First Team (1993); J. Walter Kennedy Citizenship Award (2002); NBA champion (Miami Heat, 2006)	
2014	(United States) Mitch Richmond	G	6× NBA All-Star; NBA Rookie of the Year (1988); 3× All-NBA second team NBA Champion (Los Angeles Lakers, 2002); 2× Olympic medalist with Team USA ( Bronze in 1988, Gold in 1996)	
2014	(United States) Guy Rodgers	G	3× MVP in the Philadelphia Big 5 Consensus First Team All-American (Temple, 1958); Consensus Second Team All-American (1957); NCAA All-Tournament Team (1958); 4× NBA All-Star; 2× NBA assists leader	
2015	(United States) Louie Dampier	G	ABA All-Time Team (1997); ABA All-Rookie First Team (1968); 7× ABA All-Star; 4× All-ABA Second Team; ABA Champion(Kentucky Colonels, 1975); AP First Team All-America, 1966; 2× Consensus Second Team All-American (1966, 1967)	
2015	(United States) Spencer Haywood	F	Summer Olympics Gold: 1968; ABA All-Time Team (1997); ABA All-Rookie First Team (1970); ABA Rookie of the Year (1970); ABA MVP (1970); ABA All-Star Game MVP (1970); ABA All-Star; All-ABA First Team; NBA Champion (Los Angeles Lakers, 1980); 4× NBA All-Star (1972–1975); 2× All-NBA First Team; 2× All-NBA Second Team	
2015	(United States) John Isaacs	G	World Professional Basketball Tournament Championships (1939, 1943); World Professional Basketball Tournament Second Team (1943); Utica Pics MVP (1947); New York City Basketball Hall of Fame Inductee (1992)	
2015	(United States) Lisa Leslie	C	Naismith Award (USC, 1994); Kodak All-America (1994); 8× WNBA All-Star; 3× WNBA All-Star Game MVP; 4× Summer Olympics Gold: 1996, 2000, 2004, 2008; 3× WNBA MVP (2001, 2004, 2006); 2× WNBA Champions (Los Angeles Sparks, 2001, 2002); 2× WNBA Finals MVP (2001, 2002); 8× First Team All-WNBA; 4× Second Team All-WNBA; 2× WNBA Defensive Player of the Year; 2× All-Defensive First Team; 2× All-Defensive Second Team; First player to dunk in a WNBA game	
2015	(Democratic Republic of the Congo) Dikembe Mutombo	C	8× NBA All-Star (1992, 1995–1998, 2000–2002); All-NBA Second Team (2001); 2× All-NBA Third Team (1998, 2002); 4× NBA Defensive Player of the Year (1995, 1997, 1998, 2001); 3× All-NBA Defensive First Team (1997–1998, 2001); 3× NBA All-Defensive Second Team (1995, 1999, 2002); NBA All-Rookie First Team (1992); 2× NBA rebounding leader 3× NBA blocks leader 2× J. Walter Kennedy Citizenship Award (2001, 2009); Third-team All-American – AP, UPI (1991)	
2015	(United States) Jo Jo White	G	Summer Olympics Gold: 1968; 2× NBA Champion (1974, 1976); 7× NBA All Star; NBA Finals MVP (1976); 2× All-NBA Second Team; NBA All-Rookie First Team (1970); 2× Consensus Second Team All-American (1968, 1969); The Sporting News First Team All-America (1968, 1969)	
2016	(China) Yao Ming	C	8× NBA All-Star; 2× All-NBA Second Team; 3× All-NBA Third Team; NBA All-Rookie First Team (2003); CBA champion (2002); CBA MVP (2001); CBA Finals MVP (2002); 3× FIBA Asia Cup MVP (2001, 2003, 2005); FIBA World Cup Top Scorer (2006)	
2016	(United States) Cumberland Posey	G	Known as the "best basketball player" of the 1900s-1920s. Formed, operated, and played for the Loendi Big Five, which became the most dominant basketball team of the Black Fives Era through the mid-1920s, winning four straight Colored Basketball World Championship titles.	
2016	(United States) Sheryl Swoopes	G	First player to be signed to the WNBA. 3× WNBA MVP; 4× WNBA Champion; 6× WNBA All-Star; 5× First Team All-WNBA; 2× Second Team All-WNBA; 2× WNBA Scoring Leader; 2× WNBA Steals Leader; 2× WNBA Defensive Player of the Year; 2× All-Defensive First Team; 3× Summer Olympics Gold:1996, 2000, 2004	
2016	(United States) Zelmo Beaty	C	2× NBA All-Star; NBA All-Rookie First Team (1963); 3× ABA All-Star; ABA All-Time Team	
2016	(United States) Shaquille O'Neal	C	4× NBA champion (2000, 2001, 2002, 2006); 3× NBA Finals MVP (2000–2002); NBA Most Valuable Player (2000); FIBA Basketball World Cup MVP (1994); 15× NBA All-Star (1993–1998, 2000–2007, 2009); 3× NBA All-Star Game MVP (2000, 2004, 2009); 8× All-NBA First Team (1998, 2000–2006); NBA Rookie of the Year (1993); NBA 50th Anniversary Team; Summer Olympics Gold: 1996; FIBA Basketball World Cup Gold: 1994; FIBA Hall of Fame (2017)	
2016	(United States) Allen Iverson	G	NBA Most Valuable Player (2001); 11× NBA All-Star (2000–2010); 3× All-NBA First Team (1999, 2001, 2005); NBA Rookie of the Year (1997); 4× NBA scoring champion (1999, 2001, 2002, 2005); 3× NBA steals leader (2001–2003); Summer Olympics Bronze: 2004; FIBA Americas Championship Gold (2003)	
2017	(United States) Tracy McGrady	G-F	7× NBA All-Star (2001–2007); 2× NBA scoring champion (2003, 2004); 2× All-NBA First Team (2002, 2003); 3× All-NBA Second Team (2001, 2004, 2007); 2× All-NBA Third Team (2005, 2008); NBA Most Improved Player (2001); Mr. Basketball USA (1997); FIBA Americas Championship Gold (2003)	
2017	(Greece) Nikos Galis	G	2× EuroBasket medalist Gold: 1987, Silver: 1989; EuroBasket MVP (1987); 4× EuroBasket Top Scorer (1983, 1987, 1989, 1991); FIBA World Cup Top Scorer (1986); 5× EuroLeague Top Scorer (1988–1990, 1992, 1994); EuroLeague assists leader (1994); 5× Greek League MVP (1988–1992); 4× Greek League Finals MVP (1988–1991); 5× Greek Cup Finals Top Scorer (1987, 1989, 1990, 1992, 1993); 11× Greek League Top Scorer (1981–1991); Euroscar (1987); Mr. Europa (1987); FIBA's 50 Greatest Players in 1991; FIBA Hall of Fame (2007); 50 Greatest EuroLeague Contributors (2008)	
2017	(United States) George McGinnis	F-C	ABA Playoffs Most Valuable Player (1973); ABA Most Valuable Player (1975); 3× NBA All-Star (1976, 1977, 1979); All-NBA First Team (1976); All-NBA Second Team (1977); 3× ABA All-Star (1973–1975); 2× All-ABA First Team (1974, 1975); All-ABA Second Team (1973); ABA All-Rookie First Team (1972); ABA All-Time Team; No. 30 retired by Indiana Pacers; Third-team All-American – AP, NABC, UPI (1971); Mr. Basketball USA 1969	
2017	(United States) Zack Clayton	G	2x World Professional Basketball Tournament winner	
2018	(United States) Ray Allen	G	Former All-Time Leader three-point field goals (2,973); 2× NBA champion (2008, 2013); 10× NBA All-Star (2000–2002, 2004–2009, 2011); All-NBA Second Team (2005); All-NBA Third Team (2001); NBA Sportsmanship Award (2003); NBA Three-Point Shootout champion (2001); NBA All-Rookie Second Team (1997); Consensus first-team All-American (1996); UPI Player of the Year (1996); Big East Player of the Year (1996); 2× First-team All-Big East (1995, 1996); USA Basketball Male Athlete of the Year (1995); Summer Olympics Gold: 2000	
2018	(United States) Maurice Cheeks	G	NBA champion (1983); 4× NBA All-Star (1983, 1986–1988); 4× NBA All-Defensive First Team (1983–1986); NBA All-Defensive Second Team (1987); No. 10 retired by the Philadelphia 76ers	
2018	(United States) Grant Hill	F	7× NBA All-Star (1995–1998, (2000–2001, 2005); All-NBA First Team (1997); 4× All-NBA Second Team (1996, 1998–2000); NBA Co-Rookie of the Year (1995); NBA All-Rookie First Team (1995); 3× NBA Sportsmanship Award (2005, 2008, 2010); 2× NCAA champion (1991, 1992); Consensus first-team All-American (1994); Consensus second-team All-American (1993); ACC Player of the Year (1994); NABC Defensive Player of the Year (1993); Summer Olympics Gold: 1996; No. 33 retired by Duke	
2018	(United States) Jason Kidd	G	NBA champion (2011); 10× NBA All-Star (1996, 1998, 2000–2004, 2007, 2008, 2010); 5× All-NBA First Team (1999–2002, 2004); All-NBA Second Team (2003); 4× NBA All-Defensive First Team (1999, 2001, 2002, 2006); 5× NBA All-Defensive Second Team (2000, 2003–2005, 2007); NBA Co-Rookie of the Year (1995); 5× NBA assists leader (1999–2001, 2003, 2004); 2× NBA Sportsmanship Award (2012, 2013); USA Basketball Male Athlete of the Year (2007); No. 5 retired by the Brooklyn Nets; Consensus first-team All-American (1994); USBWA National Freshman of the Year (1993); Pac-10 Player of the Year (1994); Pac-10 Freshman of the Year (1993); No. 5 retired by University of California; Naismith Prep Player of the Year (1992); 2× California Mr. Basketball (1991, 1992); 2× Summer Olympics Gold: 2000, 2008	
2018	(Canada) Steve Nash	G	2× NBA Most Valuable Player (2005, 2006); 8× NBA All-Star (2002, 2003, 2005–2008, 2010, 2012); 3× All-NBA First Team (2005–2007); 2× All-NBA Second Team (2008, 2010); 2× All-NBA Third Team (2002, 2003); 5× NBA assists leader (2005–2007, 2010, 2011); 4× 50–40–90 club (2006, 2008–2010); J. Walter Kennedy Citizenship Award (2007); Phoenix Suns Ring of Honor; No. 13 retired by Phoenix Suns; 2× FIBA AmeriCup MVP (1999, 2003); Lou Marsh Trophy (2005); 3× Lionel Conacher Award (2002, 2005, 2006); 2× WCC Player of the Year (1995, 1996); No. 11 retired by Santa Clara	
2018	(United States) Katie Smith	G-F	2× WNBA champion (2006, 2008); WNBA Finals MVP (2008); 2× All-WNBA First Team (2001, 2003); 7× WNBA All-Star (2000–2003, 2005, 2006, 2009); WNBA scoring champion (2001); WNBA's All-Decade Team (2006); WNBA's Top 15 Players of All Time (2011); WNBA Top 20@20 (2016); Big Ten Player of the Year (1996); Chicago Tribune Silver Basketball (1996); 3× Summer Olympics Gold: 2000, 2004, 2008; 3× World Cup Gold: 1998, 2002 Bronze: 2006	
2018	(United States) Tina Thompson	F	4× WNBA champion (1997, 1998, 1999, 2000); 9× WNBA All-Star (1999–2003, 2006, 2007, 2009, 2013); WNBA All-Star Game MVP (2000); 3× All-WNBA First Team (1997–1998, 2004); 4× All-WNBA Second Team (1999–2002); WNBA's Top 15 Players of All Time (2011); WNBA Top 20@20 (2016); Member of WNBA All-Decade Team; Russian National League champion (2007); EuroLeague champion (2007); Romanian National League champion (2010); 2× Summer Olympics Gold: 2004, 2008; 2× World Cup Gold: 1998 Bronze: 2006	
2018	(United States) Ora Mae Washington		Women's Basketball Hall of Fame (2009)	
2018	(Socialist Federal Republic of Yugoslavia) (Croatia) Dino Rađa	F-C	2× EuroLeague champion (1989, 1990); FIBA European Selection (1991); FIBA Korać Cup champion (1992); 3× Yugoslav League champion (1988–1990); 2× Greek League champion (1998, 1999); Greek League Finals MVP (1998); 2× Croatian League champion (2002, 2003); Yugoslav Cup winner (1990); Croatian Cup winner (2000); NBA All-Rookie Second Team (1994); EuroLeague Final Four MVP (1989); FIBA's 50 Greatest Players (1991); 50 Greatest EuroLeague Contributors (2008); 2× Summer Olympics Silver: 1988, 1992; 2× FIBA World Cup Gold: 1990 Bronze: 1994; 5x EuroBasket Gold: 1989, 1991 Bronze: 1987, 1993, 1995	
2018	(United States) Charlie Scott	G	NBA champion (1976); 3× NBA All-Star (1973–1975); 2× ABA All-Star (1971, 1972); All-ABA First Team (1971); All-ABA Second Team (1972); ABA Rookie of the Year (1971); ABA All-Rookie First Team (1971); ABA All-Time Team; 2× Consensus second-team All-American (1969, 1970); ACC Athlete of the Year (1970); College Basketball Hall of Fame (2015); Summer Olympics Gold: 1968	
2019	(United States) Carl Braun	G	NBA champion (1962); 5× NBA All-Star (1953–1957); All-BAA Second Team (1948); All-NBA Second Team (1954)	
2019	(United States) Chuck Cooper	F/G	First African-American drafted into the NBA; No. 15 retired by Duquesne; Consensus second-team All-American (1950)	
2019	(Socialist Federal Republic of Yugoslavia) (Serbia and Montenegro) Vlade Divac	C	NBA All-Star (2001); NBA All-Rookie First Team (1990); J. Walter Kennedy Citizenship Award (2000); No. 21 retired by the Sacramento Kings; Mister Europa Player of the Year (1989); FIBA's 50 Greatest Players (1991); 50 Greatest EuroLeague Contributors (2008); 2× Summer Olympics Silver: 1988, 1996; FIBA World Cup Bronze 1986; 2x FIBA World Cup Gold: 1990, 2002; 3x EuroBasket Gold: 1989, 1991, 1995; 2x EuroBasket Bronze: 1987, 1999; FIBA Hall of Fame (2010)	
2019	(United States) Bobby Jones	F	NBA champion (1983); 4× NBA All-Star (1977, 1978, 1981, 1982); 8× NBA All-Defensive First Team (1977–1984); NBA All-Defensive Second Team (1985); NBA Sixth Man of the Year (1983); ABA All-Star (1976); All-ABA Second Team (1976); 2× ABA All-Defensive First Team (1975, 1976); ABA All-Rookie First Team (1975); No. 24 retired by Philadelphia 76ers Consensus second-team All-American (1974); Summer Olympics Silver: 1972	
2019	(United States) Sidney Moncrief	G	5x NBA All-Star (1982–1986); All-NBA First Team (1983); 4x All-NBA Second Team (1982, 1984–1986); 2x NBA Defensive Player of the Year (1983, 1984); 4x NBA All-Defensive First Team (1983–1986); NBA All-Defensive Second Team (1982); No. 4 retired by the Milwaukee Bucks; Consensus first-team All-American (1979); SWC Player of the Year (1979); College Basketball Hall of Fame (2018)	
2019	(United States) Jack Sikma	F/C	NBA champion (1979); 7× NBA All-Star (1979–1985); NBA All-Defensive Second Team (1982); NBA All-Rookie First Team (1978); No. 43 retired by the Seattle SuperSonics; 2x First-Team NAIA All-American (1976, 1977); Third-Team NAIA All-American (1975); 3x CCIW Player of the Year (1975–1977)	
2019	(United States) Teresa Weatherspoon	G	First WNBA player with 1,000 points and 1,000 assists 5× WNBA All-Star (1999–2003); 2x WNBA Defensive Player of the Year (1997, 1998); 4× All-WNBA Second Team (1997–2000); WNBA's Top 15 Players of All Time (2011); WNBA Top 20@20 (2016); 6x Italian League All-Star (1989–1994); Wade Trophy (1988); Honda Sports Award (1988); 2x Kodak All-American (1987, 1988); America South Player of the Year (1988); Broderick Cup (1988); Summer Olympics Gold: 1988 Bronze: 1992; World Cup Gold: 1986	
2019	(United States) Paul Westphal	G	NBA champion (1974); 5× NBA All-Star (1977–1981); 3x All-NBA First Team (1977, 1979, 1980); All-NBA Second Team (1978); Phoenix Suns Ring of Honor; No. 44 retired by the Phoenix Suns; No. 25 retired by USC; College Basketball Hall of Fame (2018)	
2020	(United States) Kobe Bryant	G	5× NBA champion (2000–2002, 2009, 2010); 2× NBA Finals MVP (2009, 2010); NBA Most Valuable Player (2008); 18× NBA All-Star (1998, 2000–2016); 4× NBA All-Star Game MVP (2002, 2007, 2009, 2011); 11× All-NBA First Team (2002–2004, 2006–2013); 2× All-NBA Second Team (2000, 2001); 2× All-NBA Third Team (1999, 2005); 9× NBA All-Defensive First Team (2000, 2003, 2004, 2006–2011); 3× NBA All-Defensive Second Team (2001, 2002, 2012); 2× NBA scoring champion (2006, 2007); NBA Slam Dunk Contest champion (1997); NBA All-Rookie Second Team (1997); Nos. 8 & 24 retired by Los Angeles Lakers; Naismith Prep Player of the Year (1996); First-team Parade All-American (1996); Fourth-team Parade All-American (1995); McDonald's All-American (1996); 2× Summer Olympics Gold: 2008, 2012	
2020	(United States) Tamika Catchings	F	WNBA champion (2012); WNBA Finals MVP (2012); WNBA MVP (2011); 10× WNBA All-Star (2002, 2003, 2005–2007, 2009, 2011, 2013–2015); 7× All-WNBA First Team (2002, 2003, 2006, 2009–2012); 5× All-WNBA Second Team (2004, 2005, 2007, 2013, 2015); 5× WNBA Defensive Player of the Year (2005, 2006, 2009, 2010, 2012); 10× WNBA All-Defensive First Team (2005–2013, 2015); 2× WNBA All-Defensive Second Team (2014, 2016); 8× WNBA steals leader (2002, 2005–2007, 2009, 2010, 2013, 2016); WNBA Rookie of the Year (2002); WNBA 10th Anniversary Team (2006); WNBA 15th Anniversary Team (2011); WNBA 20th Anniversary Team (2016); WNBA 25th Anniversary Team (2021); Indiana Fever No. 24 retired NCAA champion (1998); Women's Basketball Hall of Fame (2021); Summer Olympics Gold: 2004, 2008, 2012, 2016; FIBA World Championship Gold: 2002, 2010; Bronze: 2006; FIBA Under-19 World Cup Gold: 1997; FIBA Under-18 Americas Championship Silver: 1996	
2020	(United States) Tim Duncan	F/C	5× NBA champion (1999, 2003, 2005, 2007, 2014); 3× NBA Finals MVP (1999, 2003, 2005); 2× NBA Most Valuable Player (2002, 2003); 15× NBA All-Star (1998, 2000–2011, 2013, 2015); NBA All-Star Game co-MVP (Note: along with Shaquille O'Neal) (2000); 10× All-NBA First Team (1998–2005, 2007, 2013); 3× All-NBA Second Team (2006, 2008, 2009); 2× All-NBA Third Team (2010, 2015); 8× NBA All-Defensive First Team (1999–2003, 2005, 2007, 2008); 7× NBA All-Defensive Second Team (1998, 2004, 2006, 2009, 2010, 2013, 2015); NBA Rookie of the Year (1998); NBA All-Rookie First Team (1998); NBA 75th Anniversary Team; No. 21 retired by San Antonio Spurs; No. 21 retired by Wake Forest Demon Deacons; Summer Olympics Bronze: 2004; FIBA Americas Championship Gold: 1999, 2003; Goodwill Games Bronze: 1994; Summer Universiade Gold: 1995 Fukuoka	
2020	(United States) Kevin Garnett	F/C	NBA champion (2008); NBA Most Valuable Player (2004); 15× NBA All-Star (1997, 1998, 2000–2011, 2013); NBA All-Star Game MVP (2003); 4× All-NBA First Team (2000, 2003, 2004, 2008); 3× All-NBA Second Team (2001, 2002, 2005); 2× All-NBA Third Team (1999, 2007); NBA Defensive Player of the Year (2008); 9× NBA All-Defensive First Team (2000–2005, 2008, 2009, 2011); 3× NBA All-Defensive Second Team (2006, 2007, 2012); 4× NBA rebounding champion (2004–2007); NBA All-Rookie Second Team (1996); J. Walter Kennedy Citizenship Award (2006); Mr. Basketball USA (1995); 2× First-team Parade All-American (1994, 1995); McDonald's All-American Game MVP (1995); Illinois Mr. Basketball (1995); South Carolina Mr. Basketball (1994); Summer Olympics Gold: 2000	
2021	(United States) Chris Bosh	C/F	2x NBA champion (2012 & 2013); 11x NBA All-Star (2006-2016); NBA All-Rookie First Team (2004); 1x All-NBA Second Team (2007); Summer Olympics Gold: 2008	
2021	(United States) Bob Dandridge	F/G	2x NBA Champion (1971, 1978); 4x NBA All-Star (1973, 1975, 1976, 1979); NBA All-Rookie First Team (1970); 1x All-NBA Second Team (1979); 1x NBA All-Defensive First Team (1979)	
2021	(United States) Yolanda Griffith	C	WNBA champion (2005); WNBA Finals MVP (2005); WNBA MVP (1999); 8× WNBA All-Star (1999–2001, 2003–2007); 2× All-WNBA First Team (1999, 2005); 3× All-WNBA Second Team (2000, 2001, 2004); 2× WNBA rebounding champion (1999, 2001); 2× WNBA steals champion (1999, 2004); WNBA Defensive Player of the Year (1999); 2× WNBA All-Defensive Team (2005, 2006); WNBA 10th Anniversary Team (2006); WNBA 15th Anniversary Team (2011); WNBA 20th Anniversary Team (2016); WNBA 25th Anniversary Team (2021); Women's Basketball Hall of Fame (2014); Summer Olympics Gold: 2000, 2004	
2021	(Australia) Lauren Jackson	F/C	7× WNBL champion (1999, 2000, 2002, 2003, 2006, 2010, 2024); 4× WNBL MVP (1999, 2000, 2003, 2004); 4× WNBL Grand Final MVP (2002, 2003, 2006, 2010); 6× WNBL All-Star Five (1999–2004); 2× WNBA champion (2004, 2010); 3× WNBA MVP (2003, 2007, 2010); WNBA Finals MVP (2010); WNBA Defensive Player of the Year (2007); 7× All-WNBA First Team (2003–2007, 2009, 2010); All-WNBA Second Team (2008); 7× WNBA All-Star (2001–2003, 2005–2007, 2009); 3× WNBA scoring champion (2003, 2004, 2007); WNBA rebounding champion (2007); 2× All-Defensive First Team (2007, 2009); 3× All-Defensive Second Team (2005, 2008, 2010); 3× WNBA Peak Performer (2003, 2004, 2007); WNBA 10th Anniversary Team (2006); WNBA 15th Anniversary Team (2011); WNBA 20th Anniversary Team (2016); WNBA 25th Anniversary Team (2021); No. 15 retired by Seattle Storm; Australian Basketball Hall of Fame (2019); Women's Basketball Hall of Fame (2021); Summer Olympics Silver: 2000, 2004, 2008; Bronze: 2012, 2024; FIBA World Championship Gold: 2006; Bronze: 1998, 2002, 2022; World Junior Championships Silver: 1997; Commonwealth Games Gold: 2006	
2021	(United States) Fats Jenkins		A Two-Sport professional Athlete in both baseball and basketball in the 1920s and 1930s when both sports were racially segregated. Played basketball for the St. Christopher's Club youth team and then for the first teams that were named "Colored Basketball World's Champions" in 1917, 1918 and 1919. Went on to play for the New York Incorporators, the Loendi Big Five, the Commonwealth Big Five and eventually the renowned New York Renaissance where he served as team captain. The Colored Basketball World Championships were won by his team for eight straight years, even though he moved twice to three different teams. Standing at just 5’7” and 170 pounds, Jenkins was admired for his ability to remain poised and guide his team, while always aspiring for excellence.	
2021	(Socialist Federal Republic of Yugoslavia) (Croatia) Toni Kukoč	F	3× NBA champion (1996–1998); NBA Sixth Man of the Year (1996); NBA All-Rookie Second Team (1994); FIBA World Championship MVP (1990); FIBA EuroBasket MVP (1991); FIBA's 50 Greatest Players (1991); 5× Euroscar Player of the Year (1990, 1991, 1994, 1996, 1998); 4× Mister Europa Player of the Year (1990–1992, 1996); 3× EuroLeague champion (1989–1991); 3× EuroLeague Final Four MVP (1990, 1991, 1993); EuroLeague Finals Top Scorer (1990); FIBA European Selection (1991); 50 Greatest EuroLeague Contributors (2008); Italian League champion (1992); Italian Cup winner (1993); 4× Yugoslav League champion (1988–1991); 2× Yugoslav Cup winner (1990, 1991); 3× Croatian Sportsman of the Year (1989–1991); Franjo Bučar State Award for Sport (1992); FIBA Under-19 World Cup MVP (1987); 4× EuroBasket medalist Gold: 1989, 1991, Bronze: 1987, 1995; 2x FIBA World Cup medalist Gold: 1990, Bronze:1994; 2x Summer Olympics Silver: 1988, 1992	
2021	(United States) Pearl Moore		Women’s college basketball all-time leader in points scored (4,061 Points); 4x AIAW Small College All-American; Averaged 30 points per game Scored in double figures in all 127 college games American Women’s Sports Foundation Small College Player of the Year (1979); South Carolina AIAW Player of the Year (1979); South Carolina Amateur Athlete of the Year (1979); 1x WBL All-Star (1981); Enshrinee of the South Carolina Athletic Hall of Fame (2000)	
2021	(United States) Paul Pierce	F	NBA champion (2008); NBA Finals MVP (2008); 10x NBA All-Star (2002-2006, 2008-2012); NBA All-Rookie First Team (1999); 1x All-NBA Second Team (2009); 3x All-NBA Third Team (2002, 2003, 2008)	
2021	(United States) Ben Wallace	C	NBA champion (2004); 4x NBA All-Star (2003-2006); 4x NBA Defensive Player of the Year (2002, 2003, 2005, 2006); 3x All-NBA Second Team (2003, 2004, 2006); 2x All-NBA Third Team (2002, 2005); 5x NBA All-Defensive First Team (2002-2006); 1x NBA All-Defensive Second Team (2007); 2x NBA rebounding leader (2002, 2003); 1x NBA blocks leader (2002); First undrafted player in modern NBA history to be elected into the Basketball Hall of Fame.	
2021	(United States) Chris Webber	F	5x NBA All-Star (1997, 2000-2003); 1x All-NBA First Team (2001); 3x All-NBA Second Team (1999, 2002, 2003); 1x All-NBA Third Team (2000); NBA Rookie Of The Year (1994); NBA All-Rookie First Team (1994); 1x NBA rebounding leader (1999)	
2022	(United States) Sonny Boswell	G	World Professional Basketball Tournament winner	
2022	(Argentina) Manu Ginóbili	G	4× NBA champion (2003, 2005, 2007, 2014); 2× NBA All-Star (2005, 2011); 2× All-NBA Third Team (2008, 2011); NBA Sixth Man of the Year (2008); NBA All-Rookie Second Team (2003); EuroLeague champion (2001); EuroLeague Finals MVP (2001); All-EuroLeague First Team (2002); Italian League champion (2001); 2× Italian Cup winner (2001, 2002); 2× Italian League MVP (2001, 2002); Italian Cup MVP (2002); 50 Greatest EuroLeague Contributors (2008); Summer Olympics Gold: 2004, Bronze: 2008; FIBA Olympics MVP (2004)	
2022	(United States) Theresa Grentz	F	3x Association for Intercollegiate Athletics for Women championships winner	
2022	(United States) Tim Hardaway	G	5× NBA All-Star (1991–1993, 1997, 1998); All-NBA First Team (1997); 3× All-NBA Second Team (1992, 1998, 1999); All-NBA Third Team (1993); NBA All-Rookie First Team (1990); Summer Olympics Gold: 2000	
2022	(United States) Lou Hudson	G	6x NBA All-Star (1969-74)	
2022	(United States) Inman Jackson	C	World Professional Basketball Tournament winner	
2022	(Socialist Federal Republic of Yugoslavia) Radivoj Korać	F	Summer Olympics Silver: 1968; 2x FIBA World Cup medalist Silver: 1963, 1967	
2022	(United States) Albert Pullins		Member of the first Harlem Globetrotters; Created the Harlem Clowns	
2022	(United States) Lindsay Whalen	G	4× WNBA champion (2011, 2013, 2015, 2017); 5× WNBA All-Star (2006, 2011, 2013–2015); 3× All-WNBA First Team (2008, 2011, 2013); 2× All-WNBA Second Team (2012, 2014); 3× WNBA Peak Performer (2008, 2011, 2012); 3× WNBA assists leader (2008, 2011–2012); WNBA 20th Anniversary Team (2016); WNBA 25th Anniversary Team (2021); Summer Olympics Gold: 2012, 2016	
2022	(United States) Swin Cash	F	3× WNBA champion (2003, 2006, 2010); 4× WNBA All-Star (2003, 2005, 2009, 2011); 2× WNBA All-Star MVP (2009, 2011); 2× All-WNBA Second Team (2003, 2004); WNBA 20th Anniversary Team (2016); WNBA 25th Anniversary Team (2021); 2× NCAA champion (2000, 2002); Summer Olympics Gold: 2004, 2012	
2023	(Spain) Pau Gasol	F/C	2× NBA champion (2009, 2010); 6× NBA All-Star (2006, 2009, 2010, 2011, 2015, 2016); 2× All-NBA Second Team (2012, 2016); 2× All-NBA Third Team (2010, 2011); NBA Rookie of the Year (2003); NBA All-Rookie First Team (2003); 3× Liga ACB champion (1999, 2001, 2021); Spanish King's Cup winner (2001); Spanish King's Cup MVP (2001); ACB Finals MVP (2001); 2× FIBA Europe Player of the Year (2008, 2009); 2× Mister Europa Player of the Year (2004, 2009); 4× Euroscar Player of the Year (2008–2010, 2015); FIBA World Cup MVP (2006); FIBA EuroBasket MVP (2009, 2015); Summer Olympics Silver: 2008, 2012, Bronze: 2016; No. 16 retired by Los Angeles Lakers	
2023	(United States) (Russia) Becky Hammon	G	6× WNBA All-Star (2003, 2005–2007, 2009, 2011); 2× All-WNBA First Team (2007, 2009); 2× All-WNBA Second Team (2005, 2008); WNBA 15th Anniversary Team (2011); WNBA 20th Anniversary Team (2016); WNBA 25th Anniversary Team (2021); Spanish League champion (2010); Queen's Cup winner (2010); Summer Olympics Bronze: 2008; No. 25 retired by San Antonio Stars/Las Vegas Aces	
2023	(Germany) Dirk Nowitzki	F	NBA champion (2011); NBA Finals MVP (2011); NBA Most Valuable Player (2007); 14× NBA All-Star (2002–2012, 2014, 2015, 2019); 4× All-NBA First Team (2005–2007, 2009); 5× All-NBA Second Team (2002, 2003, 2008, 2010, 2011); 3× All-NBA Third Team (2001, 2004, 2012); NBA Three-Point Contest champion (2006); NBA Teammate of the Year (2017); NBA 75th Anniversary Team; Bundesliga Most Valuable Player (1999); FIBA World Cup MVP (2002); FIBA EuroBasket MVP (2005); 6× Euroscar Player of the Year (2002–2006, 2011); 2× FIBA Europe Men's Player of the Year (2005, 2011); 9× All-Europeans Power Forward of the Year (2005–2011, 2013, 2014); Mister Europa Player of the Year (2005); Laureus Lifetime Achievement Award (2020); No. 41 retired by Dallas Mavericks; No. 14 retired by Germany national team	
2023	(France) Tony Parker	G	4× NBA champion (2003, 2005, 2007, 2014); NBA Finals MVP (2007); 6× NBA All-Star (2006, 2007, 2009, 2012, 2013, 2014); 3× All-NBA Second Team (2011, 2012, 2013–14); All-NBA Third Team (2008–09); NBA All-Rookie First Team (2002); FIBA EuroBasket MVP (2013); 2× FIBA EuroBasket Top Scorer (2011, 2013); 2× FIBA Europe Player of the Year (2013, 2014); 2× Euroscar Award (2007, 2013); 2× L'Équipe Champion of Champions (2003, 2013); LNB All-Star (2001); No. 9 retired by San Antonio Spurs	
2023	(United States) Dwyane Wade	G	3× NBA champion (2006, 2012, 2013); NBA Finals MVP (2006); 13× NBA All-Star (2005–2016, 2019); NBA All-Star Game MVP (2010); 2× All-NBA First Team (2009, 2010); 3× All-NBA Second Team (2005, 2006, 2011); 3× All-NBA Third Team (2007, 2012, 2013); 3× NBA All-Defensive Second Team (2005, 2009, 2010); NBA scoring champion (2009); NBA All-Rookie First Team (2004); NBA 75th Anniversary Team; Consensus first-team All-American (2003); Conference USA Player of the Year (2003); Summer Olympics Gold: 2008, Bronze: 2004; No. 3 retired by Miami Heat; No. 3 retired by Marquette Golden Eagles	
2024	(United States) Seimone Augustus	F	4× WNBA champion (2011, 2013, 2015, 2017); WNBA Finals MVP (2011); 8× WNBA All-Star (2006, 2007, 2011, 2013–2015, 2017, 2018); All-WNBA First Team (2012); 5× All-WNBA Second Team (2006, 2007, 2011, 2013, 2014); WNBA Rookie of the Year (2006); WNBA All-Rookie Team (2006); WNBA 20th Anniversary Team (2016); WNBA 25th Anniversary Team (2021); Turkish Cup winner (2009); 2× Wade Trophy (2005, 2006); 2x Honda Sports Award for basketball (2005, 2006); USBWA National Player of the Year (2005); 2x All-American – USBWA (2005, 2006); 2× First-team All-American – AP (2005, 2006); 2x Third-team All-American – AP (2003, 2004); 3× Kodak All-American (2004–2006); USA Basketball Female Athlete of the Year (2003); USBWA National Freshman of the Year (2003); McDonald's All-American (2002); Summer Olympics Gold: 2008, 2012, 2016	
2024	(United States) Dick Barnett	G	2× NBA champion (1970, 1973); 1× NBA All-Star (1968); 1x ABL champion (1962); 1x All-ABL First Team (1962); No. 12 retired by New York Knicks; 3x NAIA champion (1957-1959); 3x AP Little College All-American (1957-1959); 2x UPI (1958, 1959); 2x NAIA tournament MVP (1958, 1959)	
2024	(United States) Chauncey Billups	G	NBA champion (2004); NBA Finals MVP (2004); 5× NBA All-Star (2006–2010); All-NBA Second Team (2006); 2× All-NBA Third Team (2007, 2009); 2× NBA All-Defensive Second Team (2005, 2006); NBA Sportsmanship Award (2009); FIBA Basketball World Cup Gold: 2010; No. 1 retired by Detroit Pistons	
2024	(United States) Vince Carter	G/F	8× NBA All-Star (2000–2007); All-NBA Second Team (2001); All-NBA Third Team (2000); NBA Rookie of the Year (1999); NBA All-Rookie First Team (1999); NBA Slam Dunk Contest champion (2000); NBA Twyman-Stokes Teammate of the Year Award (2016); NBA Sportsmanship Award (2020); Consensus second-team All-American (1998); First-team Parade All-American (1995); McDonald's All-American (1995); Florida Mr. Basketball (1995); Summer Olympics Gold: 2000; No. 15 honored by North Carolina Tar Heels; No. 15 retired by Toronto Raptors; No. 15 retired by Brooklyn Nets	
2024	(United States) Michael Cooper	G	5x NBA champion (1980, 1982, 1985, 1987, 1988); NBA Defensive Player of the Year (1987); 5x NBA All-Defensive First Team (1982, 1984, 1985, 1987, 1988); 3x NBA All-Defensive Second Team (1981, 1983, 1986); 1x First-team All-American – USBWA (1978); 2× First-team All-WAC (1977, 1978); No. 21 retired by Los Angeles Lakers	
2024	(United States) Walter Davis	G/F	6× NBA All-Star (1978–1981, 1984, 1987); 2x All-NBA Second Team (1978, 1979); NBA Rookie of the Year (1978); NBA All-Rookie First Team (1978); No. 6 retired by Phoenix Suns; First-team All-ACC (1977); Second-team All-ACC (1976); Summer Olympics Gold: 1976	
2025	(United States) Carmelo Anthony	F	10× NBA All-Star (2007, 2008, 2010–2017); 2× All-NBA Second Team (2010, 2013); 4× All-NBA Third Team (2006, 2007, 2009, 2012); NBA scoring champion (2013); NBA All-Rookie First Team (2004); NBA 75th Anniversary Team; NCAA champion (2003); NCAA Final Four Most Outstanding Player (2003); Consensus second-team All-American (2003); USBWA National Freshman of the Year (2003); No. 15 retired by Syracuse Orange; 2× USA Basketball Male Athlete of the Year (2006, 2016); First-team Parade All-American (2002); Summer Olympics Gold (2008, 2012, 2016) Bronze (2004); FIBA World Championship Bronze (2006); FIBA Americas Championship Gold (2007)	
2025	(United States) Sue Bird	G	4× WNBA champion (2004, 2010, 2018, 2020); 13× WNBA All-Star (2002, 2003, 2005–2007, 2009, 2011, 2014, 2015, 2017, 2018, 2021, 2022); 5× All-WNBA First Team (2002–2005, 2016); 3× All-WNBA Second Team (2008, 2010, 2011); 3× WNBA assists leader (2005, 2009, 2016); 2× WNBA peak performer (2009, 2016); WNBA 10th Anniversary Team (2006); WNBA 15th Anniversary Team (2011); WNBA 20th Anniversary Team (2016); WNBA 25th Anniversary Team (2021); USA Basketball Female Athlete of the Year (2021); 5× Russian National League champion (2007, 2008, 2012–2014); 5× EuroLeague champion (2007–2010, 2013); 2× Europe SuperCup winner (2009, 2010); Summer Olympics Gold: 2004, 2008, 2012, 2016, 2020; FIBA World Championship Gold: 2002, 2010, 2014, 2018; Bronze: 2006; No. 10 retired by Seattle Storm	
2025	(United States) Sylvia Fowles	C	2× WNBA champion (2015, 2017); 2× WNBA Finals MVP (2015, 2017); WNBA MVP (2017); 8× WNBA All-Star (2009, 2011, 2013, 2017–2019, 2021, 2022); 3× All-WNBA First Team (2010, 2013, 2017); 5× All-WNBA Second Team (2011, 2012, 2016, 2021, 2022); 4x WNBA Defensive Player of the Year (2011, 2013, 2016, 2021); 8x WNBA All-Defensive First Team (2010–2013, 2016, 2017, 2021, 2022); 3× WNBA All-Defensive Second Team (2008, 2014, 2018); 2× WNBA blocks leader (2010, 2011); 3× WNBA rebounding champion (2013, 2018, 2022); 3× WNBA Peak Performer (2013, 2018, 2022); WNBA All-Rookie Team (2008); Kim Perrot Sportsmanship Award (2022); WNBA 25th Anniversary Team (2021); 2× WCBA champion (2016, 2017); 3× Turkish Cup winner (2011–2013); 2× Europe SuperCup winner (2009, 2010); 2× EuroLeague champion (2009, 2010); WBCA Defensive Player of the Year (2008); Summer Olympics Gold: 2008, 2012, 2016, 2020; FIBA World Championship Gold: 2010; No. 34 retired by Minnesota Lynx	
2025	(United States) Dwight Howard	C	NBA champion (2020); 8× NBA All-Star (2007–2014); 5× All-NBA First Team (2008–2012); All-NBA Second Team (2014); 2× All-NBA Third Team (2007, 2013); 3× NBA Defensive Player of the Year (2009–2011); 4× NBA All-Defensive First Team (2009–2012); NBA All-Defensive Second Team (2008); NBA All-Rookie First Team (2005); 5× NBA rebounding leader (2008–2010, 2012, 2013); 2× NBA blocks leader (2009, 2010); NBA Slam Dunk Contest champion (2008); Naismith Prep Player of the Year (2004); McDonald's All-American Game Co-MVP (2004); First-team Parade All-American (2004); Mr. Georgia Basketball (2004); Summer Olympics Gold (2008); FIBA World Championship Bronze (2006); FIBA Americas Championship Gold (2007)	
2025	(United States) Maya Moore	F	4× WNBA champion (2011, 2013, 2015, 2017); WNBA Finals MVP (2013); WNBA MVP (2014); 6× WNBA All-Star (2011, 2013–2015, 2017–2018); 3× WNBA All-Star Game MVP (2015, 2017, 2018); 5× All-WNBA First Team (2013–2017); 2× All-WNBA Second Team (2012, 2018); 2× WNBA All-Defensive Second Team (2014, 2017); WNBA steals leader (2018); WNBA scoring leader (2014); WNBA Rookie of the Year (2011); WNBA All-Rookie Team (2011); WNBA 20th Anniversary Team (2016); WNBA 25th Anniversary Team (2021); FIBA World Championship MVP (2014); 2× EuroLeague Women champion (2012, 2018); Liga Femenina champion (2012); 3× WCBA champion (2013–2015); Summer Olympics Gold: 2012, 2016; FIBA World Championship Gold: 2010, 2014; World University Games Gold: 2009; Women's Basketball Hall of Fame inductee (2024); No. 23 retired by Minnesota Lynx	
2026	(United States) Elena Delle Donne	G/F	WNBA champion (2019); 2× WNBA MVP (2015, 2019); 7× WNBA All-Star (2013–2015, 2017–2019, 2023); 4× All-WNBA First Team (2015, 2016, 2018, 2019); All-WNBA Second Team (2013); WNBA 25th Anniversary Team (2021); 50–40–90 club (2019); WNBA Rookie of the Year (2013); WNBA All-Rookie Team (2013); WNBA scoring champion (2015); WNBA Peak Performer (2015); NCAA season scoring leader (2012); Summer Olympics Gold: 2016; FIBA World Championship Gold: 2018; World University Games Gold: 2011	
2026	(United States) Chamique Holdsclaw	F	6× WNBA All-Star (1999–2003, 2005); 3× All-WNBA Second Team (1999, 2001, 2002); WNBA Rookie of the Year (1999); 2× WNBA rebounding champion (2002, 2003); WNBA scoring champion (2002); Summer Olympics Gold: 2000; FIBA World Championship Gold: 1998	
2026	(United States) Candace Parker	F	3× WNBA champion (2016, 2021, 2023); WNBA Finals MVP (2016); 2× WNBA MVP (2008, 2013); 7× WNBA All-Star (2011, 2013, 2014, 2017, 2018, 2021, 2022); WNBA All-Star Game MVP (2013); 7× All-WNBA First Team (2008, 2012–2014, 2017, 2020, 2022); 3× All-WNBA Second Team (2009, 2015, 2018); 2× WNBA All-Defensive Second Team (2009, 2012); WNBA Rookie of the Year (2008); WNBA All-Rookie Team (2008); WNBA Defensive Player of the Year (2020); WNBA assists leader (2015); 3× WNBA rebounding leader (2008, 2009, 2020); 2× WNBA blocks leader (2009, 2012); 3× WNBA peak performer (2008, 2009, 2020); WNBA 20th Anniversary Team (2016); WNBA 25th Anniversary Team (2021); No. 3 retired by Los Angeles Sparks; No. 3 retired by Chicago Sky; 2× NCAA champion (2007, 2008); 2× NCAA Tournament MOP (2007, 2008); Summer Olympics Gold: 2008, 2012; FIBA Under-18 Americas Championship Gold: 2018; World University Games Gold: 2004	
2026	(United States) Amar'e Stoudemire	F/C	6× NBA All-Star (2005, 2007–2011); All-NBA First Team (2007); 4× All-NBA Second Team (2005, 2008, 2010, 2011); NBA Rookie of the Year (2003); NBA All-Rookie First Team (2003); No. 32 retired by Phoenix Suns; Summer Olympics Bronze (2004); FIBA Americas Championship Gold (2007)	
