= Portland Trail Blazers accomplishments and records =

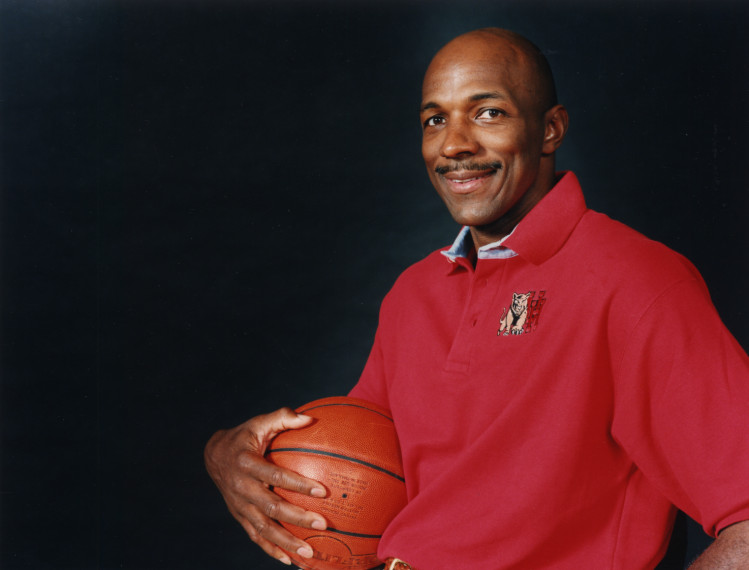
Clyde Drexler is the Trail Blazers' franchise leader in games played, minutes played, field goals made and attempted, free throws made and attempted, offensive rebounds, steals, personal fouls, and turnovers

The Portland Trail Blazers are an American professional basketball team based in Portland, Oregon. The Trail Blazers play in the Northwest Division of the Western Conference in the National Basketball Association (NBA). The franchise entered the NBA in 1970, and is one of two major league franchise in Oregon. The Trail Blazers sold out 814 consecutive home games from 1977 through 1995, the second longest such streak for American professional sports teams which was broken July 9, 2011, by the Dayton Dragons. The team has played their home games at the Moda Center (formerly known as the Rose Garden), since the 1995–96 NBA season. The Trail Blazers are owned by the Paul G. Allen Trust chaired by Jody Allen, since the passing of owner Paul Allen in 2018. Since the team joined the NBA in 1970, it has won one NBA championship, three conference championships, six division championships, and has appeared in the NBA playoffs 34 times.

The team has advanced to the NBA Finals three times, winning the NBA Championship once, in 1977. The other NBA Finals appearances were in 1990 and 1992. The team has qualified for the playoffs in the majority of its seasons, including a streak of 21 straight appearances from 1983 to 2003. Six Hall of Fame players have played for the Trail Blazers (Lenny Wilkens, Bill Walton, Clyde Drexler, Dražen Petrović, Scottie Pippen, and Arvydas Sabonis), four of whom (Wilkens, Walton, Drexler, and Pippen) were recognized as one of the league's 50 greatest. Bill Walton is the franchise's most decorated player; he was the NBA Finals Most Valuable Player (MVP) in 1977, and the regular season MVP the following year. Four Blazer rookies (Geoff Petrie, Sidney Wicks, Brandon Roy. and Damian Lillard) have won the NBA Rookie of the Year award. Two Hall of Fame coaches, Lenny Wilkens and Jack Ramsay, have coached the Blazers, and two others, Mike Schuler and Mike Dunleavy, have won the NBA Coach of the Year award with the team.

The Blazers have set several team and individual league records. They are the only team to have held a team scoreless during overtime on two occasions. In a game that went to four overtime periods, the Blazers and the Chicago Bulls combined to commit 87 personal fouls. In another four-overtime game, the Blazers and the Utah Jazz collected a combined 106 defensive rebounds. The Blazers set two records against the Golden State Warriors: the record for combined three-point field-goal attempts by both teams and the record for the most three-point field-goal attempts by one player. This page details the all-time statistics, records, and other achievements pertaining to the Portland Trail Blazers.

== Individual records ==
=== Franchise leaders ===
Bold denotes still active with team.

Italic denotes still active but not with team.

Points scored (regular season) (as of the end of the 2025–26 season)

1. **Damian Lillard** (19,376)
2. Clyde Drexler (18,040)
3. LaMarcus Aldridge (12,562)
4. Terry Porter (11,330)
5. CJ McCollum (10,710)
6. Clifford Robinson (10,405)
7. Jerome Kersey (10,067)
8. Jim Paxson (10,003)
9. Geoff Petrie (9,732)
10. Mychal Thompson (9,215)
11. Rasheed Wallace (9,119)
12. Sidney Wicks (8,882)
13. Kevin Duckworth (7,188)
14. Damon Stoudamire (6,745)
15. Kiki Vandeweghe (6,698)
16. Zach Randolph (6,202)
17. Brandon Roy (6,107)
18. Anfernee Simons (5,837)
19. Calvin Natt (5,738)
20. Buck Williams (5,677)

Other statistics (regular season) (as of the end of the 2025–26 season)

Most games played
Player	Games
Clyde Drexler	867
Jerome Kersey	831
**Damian Lillard**	769
Terry Porter	758
LaMarcus Aldridge	648
Clifford Robinson	644
Jim Paxson	627
Larry Steele	610
CJ McCollum	564
Buck Williams	557

Most minutes played
Player	Minutes
Clyde Drexler	29,496
**Damian Lillard**	27,942
Terry Porter	23,978
LaMarcus Aldridge	22,972
Jerome Kersey	21,760
Clifford Robinson	19,839
Rasheed Wallace	19,309
Mychal Thompson	18,913
Jim Paxson	18,398
CJ McCollum	17,746

Most rebounds
Player	Rebounds
LaMarcus Aldridge	5,434
Clyde Drexler	5,339
Jerome Kersey	5,078
Mychal Thompson	4,878
Buck Williams	4,861
Sidney Wicks	4,086
Rasheed Wallace	3,797
Arvydas Sabonis	3,436
Lloyd Neal	3,370
Clifford Robinson	3,352

Most assists
Player	Assists
Terry Porter	5,319
**Damian Lillard**	5,151
Clyde Drexler	4, 933
Damon Stoudamire	3,018
Rod Strickland	2,573
Geoff Petrie	2,057
Jim Paxson	2,007
CJ McCollum	1,892
Mychal Thompson	1,848
Jerome Kersey	1,762

Most steals
Player	Steals
Clyde Drexler	1,795
Terry Porter	1,182
Jerome Kersey	1,059
Jim Paxson	857
Larry Steele	846
**Damian Lillard**	732
Clifford Robinson	69
Lionel Hollins	598
Bob Gross	593
Damon Stoudamire	556

Most blocks
Player	Blocks
Mychal Thompson	768
Clifford Robinson	726
Rasheed Wallace	693
LaMarcus Aldridge	658
Joel Przybilla	623
Jerome Kersey	622
Clyde Drexler	594
Bill Walton	533
Arvydas Sabonis	494
Wayne Cooper	425

Most three-pointers made
Player	3-pointers made
**Damian Lillard**	2,387
CJ McCollum	1,297
Anfernee Simons	967
Wesley Matthews	826
Terry Porter	773
Nicolas Batum	751
Damon Stoudamire	717
**Jerami Grant**	499
Clifford Robinson	492
Steve Blake	492

== Individual accomplishments ==
=== All-Stars and All-Star Weekend participants ===
The NBA All-Star Game is played between the Eastern Conference All-Star Team and the Western Conference All-Star Team; the teams' starters are chosen through fan voting, and the teams' reserves are chosen by NBA teams' coaches.

NBA All-Star Game Selections

- 8× – Clyde Drexler (1986, 1988–1994).
- 7× – Damian Lillard (2014, 2015, 2018–2021, 2023)
- 4× – LaMarcus Aldridge (2012–2015)
- 4× – Sidney Wicks (1972–1975).
- 3× – Maurice Lucas (1977–1979).
- 3× – Brandon Roy (2008–2010)
- 2× – Kevin Duckworth (1989, 1991)
- 2× – Jim Paxson (1983–1984)
- 2× – Geoff Petrie (1971, 1974)
- 2× – Terry Porter (1991, 1993)
- 2× – Rasheed Wallace (2000–2001)
- 2× – Bill Walton (1977–1978)
- 1× – Deni Avdija (2026)
- 1× – Lionel Hollins (1978)
- 1× – Steve Johnson (1988)
- 1× – Clifford Robinson (1994)
- 1× – Kermit Washington (1980)

NBA All-Star Game head coach

- 1× – Jack Ramsay (1978)
- 1× – Rick Adelman (1991)

All-Star Weekend participants

Rookie Challenge

- Damian Lillard, 2012–13
- LaMarcus Aldridge, 2007–08
- Rudy Fernández, 2008–09
- Greg Oden, 2008–09 (DNP)
- Brandon Roy, 2006–07 and 2007–08
- Arvydas Sabonis, 1995–96
- Alvin Williams, 1997–98

Slam Dunk Contest

- Damian Lillard
- Clyde Drexler
- Rudy Fernández
- Jerome Kersey participated in four Slam Dunk Contests, finishing in second in 1987.
- Anfernee Simons Winner in 2021.

Three-point Shootout

- Clyde Drexler
- Terry Porter
- Clifford Robinson
- Kiki Vandeweghe, 1987
- Damian Lillard, 2014, 2019–2020, 2023 Winner
- Wesley Matthews, 2015
- CJ McCollum, 2016 & 2017
- Seth Curry, 2019

Skills Challenge

- Damian Lillard – Winner in 2013 and 2014

== Individual awards ==
The NBA presents several annual awards to recognize its teams, players and coaches for their accomplishments. In addition, three honorary teams (All-NBA, All-Rookie, All-Defensive) are formed by voting to honor the best players, best rookies and best defenders respectively.

Most Valuable Player

- Bill Walton, 1977–78

Finals Most Valuable Player

- Bill Walton, 1976–77

Rookie of the Year

- Geoff Petrie, 1970–71 (shared with Dave Cowens)
- Sidney Wicks, 1971–72
- Brandon Roy, 2006–07
- Damian Lillard, 2012–13

Most Improved Player

- Kevin Duckworth, 1987–88
- Zach Randolph, 2003–04
- CJ McCollum, 2015–16

Sixth Man of the Year

- Clifford Robinson, 1992–93

J. Walter Kennedy Citizenship Award

- Terry Porter, 1992–93
- Chris Dudley, 1995–96
- Brian Grant, 1998–99
- Damian Lillard, 2018–19

Twyman–Stokes Teammate of the Year

- Damian Lillard, 2020–21

Kareem Abdul-Jabbar Social Justice Champion Award

- Carmelo Anthony, 2020–21

Coach of the Year

- Mike Schuler, 1986–87
- Mike Dunleavy, 1998–99

First Team, All-NBA

- Bill Walton, 1977–78,
- Clyde Drexler, 1991–92
- Damian Lillard, 2017–18

Second Team, All-NBA

- Bill Walton, 1976–77
- Maurice Lucas, 1977–78
- Jim Paxson, 1983–84
- Clyde Drexler, 1987–88, 1990–91
- Brandon Roy, 2008–09
- LaMarcus Aldridge, 2014–15
- Damian Lillard, 2015–16, 2018–19, 2019–20, 2020–21

Third Team, All-NBA

- Clyde Drexler, 1989–90
- Brandon Roy, 2009–10
- LaMarcus Aldridge, 2010–11, 2013–14
- Damian Lillard, 2013–14, 2022–23

First Team, All-Defensive

- Bill Walton, 1976–77, 1977–78
- Maurice Lucas, 1977–78
- Lionel Hollins, 1977–78
- Buck Williams, 1989–90, 1990–91

Second Team, All-Defensive

- Maurice Lucas, 1978–79,
- Bobby Gross, 1977–78
- Kermit Washington, 1979–80, 1980–81
- Buck Williams, 1991–92
- Scottie Pippen, 1999–2000
- Theo Ratliff, 2003–04
- Toumani Camara, 2024–25

NBA All-Rookie First Team

- Sidney Wicks, 1971–72
- Lloyd Neal, 1972–73
- Lionel Hollins, 1975–76
- Mychal Thompson, 1978–79
- Ron Brewer, 1978–79
- Calvin Natt, 1979–80
- Kelvin Ransey, 1980–81
- Sam Bowie, 1984–85
- Arvydas Sabonis, 1995–96
- LaMarcus Aldridge, 2006–07
- Brandon Roy, 2006–07
- Damian Lillard, 2012–13

NBA All-Rookie Second Team

- Rudy Fernandez, 2008–09
- Donovan Clingan, 2024–25

== European awards and honors ==
European players in the NBA are currently eligible for three prestigious continent-wide awards for their performances with their club and national teams:

- Mr. Europa, awarded since 1976 by the Italian weekly magazine Superbasket
- Euroscar, awarded since 1979 by the Italian sports daily La Gazzetta dello Sport
- FIBA Europe Player of the Year Award, awarded since 2005 by FIBA Europe and based on voting by fans and a continent-wide panel of basketball experts, journalists, and coaches

Two Blazers players have won at least one of these awards while in Portland.

- Dražen Petrović won the Euroscar in 1989, a year that he started with Real Madrid and finished with the Blazers. Before coming to Portland, he swept the Euroscar and Mr. Europa in 1986, and after being traded to the New Jersey Nets, he won the Euroscar again in 1992 and won both awards posthumously in 1993.
- Arvydas Sabonis, like Petrović before him, won the Euroscar in the year he arrived from Real Madrid, 1995. Sabonis swept Mr. Europa and the Euroscar in 1997, and won the Euroscar again in 1999. During his previous career in the former Soviet Union, Sabonis won the Euroscar in 1984 and 1988, and both awards in 1985.

== Hall of Fame and Top 50 players ==
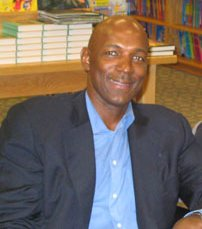
Clyde Drexler

The Naismith Memorial Basketball Hall of Fame, located in downtown Springfield, Massachusetts, honors players who have shown exceptional skill at basketball, all-time great coaches, referees, and other major contributors to the game. In 1996, the 50 Greatest Players in NBA History (also referred to as the NBA's 50th Anniversary All-Time Team or NBA's Top 50) were chosen by a panel of media, former players and coaches, current and former general managers and team executives. Five Trail Blazers players have been inducted into the Naismith Hall solely as players, and the team had four players selected to be in the NBA's Top 50 Players list. The Blazers have also had one coach inducted into the Naismith Hall exclusively in that capacity. Finally, Lenny Wilkens, who both played for and coached the Blazers, is one of only three individuals to have been inducted into the Naismith Hall in both roles.

- Clyde Drexler. Hall of Fame, Top 50.
- Dražen Petrović. Hall of Fame. Also a member of the FIBA Hall of Fame.
- Arvydas Sabonis. Hall of Fame. Also a member of the FIBA Hall of Fame.
- Bill Walton. Hall of Fame, Top 50.
- Lenny Wilkens. Hall of Fame (as both player and coach), Top 50. Spent two years as head coach of the Blazers in the 1970s, including one year as player-coach. Also named one of the Top 10 coaches—the only person to make both lists.
- Scottie Pippen. Hall of Fame, Top 50.
- Coach Dr. Jack Ramsay — Hall of Fame, coached the team to their only NBA title in 1977.

The Blazers have had three players inducted to the FIBA Hall of Fame. In addition to Petrović (inducted as part of the inaugural class in 2007) and Sabonis (inducted in 2010), Fernando Martín, who played for the Blazers in the 1986–87 season, was inducted alongside Petrović.

=== Retired numbers ===
Several players (and others) have had their numbers retired by the team. These are:

- 13 Dave Twardzik, G, 1976–80
- 14 Lionel Hollins G, 1975–80 (number retired April 18, 2007)
- 15 Larry Steele, G, 1971–80
- 20 Maurice Lucas, F, 1976–80 and 1987–88 (number retired November 4, 1988)
- 22 Clyde Drexler, G, 1983–95 (number retired March 6, 2001)
- 30 Bob Gross, F, 1975–82
- 30 Terry Porter, G, 1985–95 (number retired December 16, 2008)
- 32 Bill Walton, C, 1974–78
- 36 Lloyd Neal, C, 1972–79
- 45 Geoff Petrie, G, 1970–76

Two non-players also have honorary jerseys hanging in the rafters:

- 1 Larry Weinberg, Team founder-owner, 1970–88. Jersey is honorary, as #1 is still used by team players.
- 77 Dr. Jack Ramsay, Head Coach, 1976–86. Number selected in honor of 1976–77 season.

=== Oregon Sports Hall of Fame ===
Drexler, Lucas, Petrie, Twardzik, and Walton are members of the Oregon Sports Hall of Fame, which honors Oregon athletes, teams, coaches, and others who have made a significant contribution to sports in Oregon. Also inducted into the Hall are the 1976–77 team, and the following Trail Blazers' players:

- Danny Ainge (#9, G, 1990–92, also Oregon native)
- Steve Johnson (#33, C, 1986–89, from Oregon State)
- Steve Jones (#23, G, 1975–76, from Portland and the University of Oregon)
- Jim Paxson (#4, G, 1980–87)

== NBA records ==
Several league record performances have been recorded by members of the Trail Blazers or the team as a whole; or against the Trail Blazers by an opponent. A partial list is as follows:

Most points scored in a game, franchise history
- Damian Lillard scored 71 points in 39 minutes played against the Houston Rockets on February 26, 2023, setting a new franchise record and career high.
Most rebounds in a game, franchise history
- Enes Kanter grabbed a franchise record of 30 rebounds against the Detroit Pistons on April 10, 2021.
Most assists in a game, franchise history
- Rod Strickland tied the franchise record of 20 assists on March 30, 1996, against the Dallas Mavericks.
Most steals in a game, franchise history
- Brandon Roy stole the ball from the Washington Wizards 10 times on January 24, 2009, setting a new franchise record.
Most blocked shots in a game, franchise history
- Hassan Whiteside blocked 10 shots by the Chicago Bulls on November 29, 2019, setting a new franchise record.
Most three-point field goals in a game, franchise history
- Damian Lillard, made 13 three-point field goals against the Houston Rockets on February 26, 2023, setting a new franchise record and career high.
Most three-point field goals, half
- The Trail Blazers made 12 three-point field goals against the New Orleans Hornets on January 14, 2005, and allowed the same amount against the Milwaukee Bucks on January 5, 2001. In the latter game, Tim Thomas hit eight 3-pointers in a half, also an NBA record.
Most three-point field goal attempts, game (combined)
- The Blazers and the Golden State Warriors combined for 69 three-point field goal attempts on April 15, 2005. In that game, Damon Stoudamire of the Blazers attempted 21 three-point shots, also a record.
Largest margin of victory in overtime
- The Blazers outscored the Houston Rockets 17–0 during the first (and only) overtime period on January 22, 1983.
Most games holding an opponent scoreless in overtime
- In eight games, a team has been held scoreless in an overtime period; the Trail Blazers are the only NBA team to have held a team scoreless in overtime on two occasions, against the Rockets and the Indiana Pacers.
Most combined personal fouls, game (since the 1954–55 season)
- The Blazers and the Chicago Bulls combined for 87 personal fouls in a game that went to four overtime periods on March 16, 1984.
Fewest combined personal fouls, game
- The Blazers and the Phoenix Suns committed a combined 21 personal fouls on December 1, 2001.
Fewest turnovers, game
- The Blazers committed three turnovers against the Suns on February 22, 1991.
Most combined defensive rebounds, game
- Portland and the Utah Jazz combined for 106 defensive rebounds in a game that went to four overtime periods on October 18, 1974.
Most assists, 1st quarter
- Steve Blake tied the NBA record for most assists in the 1st quarter with 14 against the Los Angeles Clippers on February 22, 2009.

Fewest points (combined) in the first half of a game
- The Trail Blazers and the New Jersey Nets combined for 55 points in the first half of a game on November 28, 2004 (Portland led 30–25).
Fewest blocks (combined), game
- On November 22, 1973 (against Seattle) and on November 25, 1979 (against Phoenix), the Blazers and their opponents combined for zero blocks, a record that has been matched eight other times.

== See also ==
- NBA records
