= FIBA Europe Young Men's Player of the Year Award =

The FIBA Europe Young Men's Player of the Year Award was an annual Player of the Year (POY) award that was given by FIBA Europe, the European division of FIBA, the international governing body of the sport of basketball, to the best basketball player with European citizenship, aged 22 and under of the year. The inaugural award was given out in the year 2005 to Nikos Zisis of Greece. The vote was decided upon by a panel of basketball experts and also by fan voting.

The candidates included all European basketball players aged 22 and under in the world, regardless of whether they played in Europe, or anywhere else in the world. Also, the candidates included all players, from both professional sports leagues such as the NBA or the EuroLeague, etc. (including from both senior and junior level sports clubs) and amateur status, such as the NCAA's college basketball competitions, etc. The FIBA Europe Young Men's Player of the Year Award was the junior European Player of the Year award (only for players aged 22 and under) that was given by FIBA, and is not to be confused with the senior men's award, which was the FIBA Europe Men's Player of the Year Award.

The award was a calendar year by calendar year award, and was not a season by season award.

== Award winners ==
FIBA Europe Young Men's Player of the Year
- Sport: Basketball

History
- First award: 2005
- Editions: 10
- First winner: (Greece) Nikos Zisis
- Most wins: (Spain) Ricky Rubio (3)
- Most recent: (Croatia) Dario Šarić (2014)

Year	Winner	Club(s)
2005	(Greece) Nikos Zisis	(Italy) Benetton Treviso
2006	(Spain) Rudy Fernández	(Spain) Joventut Badalona
2007	(Spain) Ricky Rubio	(Spain) Joventut Badalona
2008	(Spain) Ricky Rubio (2×)	(Spain) Joventut Badalona
2009	(Spain) Ricky Rubio (3×)	(Spain) FC Barcelona
2010	(Czech Republic) Jan Veselý	(Serbia) Partizan
2011	(Lithuania) Jonas Valančiūnas	(Lithuania) Lietuvos Rytas
2012	(Lithuania) Jonas Valančiūnas (2×)	(Canada) Toronto Raptors
2013	(Croatia) Dario Šarić	(Croatia) Cibona
2014	(Croatia) Dario Šarić (2×)	(Turkey) Anadolu Efes

== See also ==
- FIBA Europe Men's Player of the Year Award
- Euroscar
- Mr. Europa
- EuroLeague MVP
- EuroLeague Final Four MVP
