= Peja Stojaković =

Serbian basketball player (born 1977)

Peja Stojaković Пеђа Стојаковић
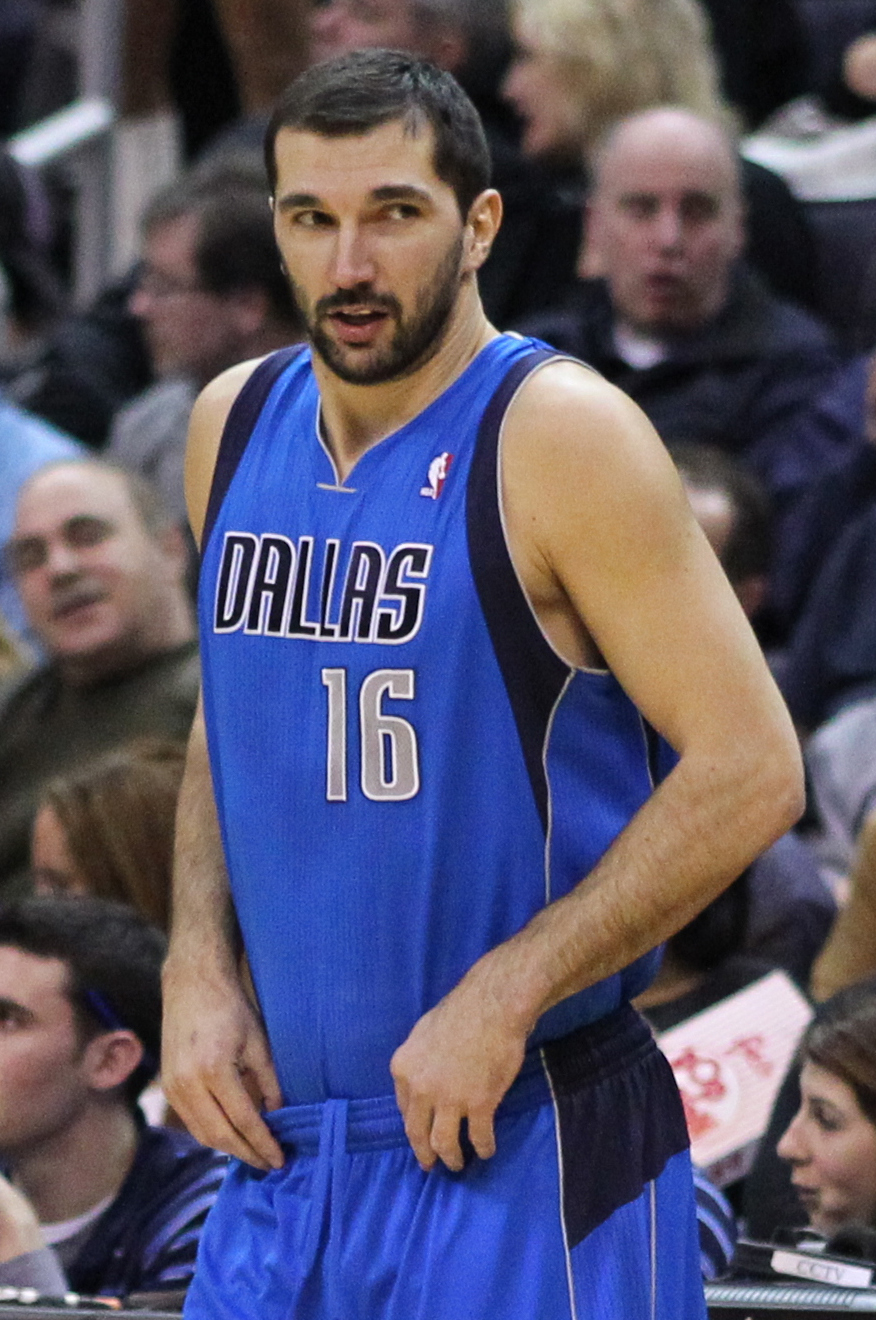
- Stojaković with the Dallas Mavericks in 2011

Personal information
- Born: 9 June 1977 (age 49) Slavonska Požega, SR Croatia, SFR Yugoslavia
- Listed height: 6 ft 10 in (2.08 m)
- Listed weight: 229 lb (104 kg)

Career information
- NBA draft: 1996: 1st round, 14th overall pick
- Drafted by: Sacramento Kings
- Playing career: 1992–2011
- Position: Small forward
- Number: 8, 16

Career history
- 1992–1993: Crvena zvezda
- 1993–1998: PAOK
- 1998–2006: Sacramento Kings
- 2006: Indiana Pacers
- 2006–2010: New Orleans Hornets
- 2010–2011: Toronto Raptors
- 2011: Dallas Mavericks

Career highlights
- As a player: NBA champion (2011); 3× NBA All-Star (2002–2004); All-NBA Second Team (2004); 2× NBA Three-Point Contest champion (2002, 2003); No. 16 retired by Sacramento Kings; FIBA EuroBasket MVP (2001); FIBA EuroLeague Top Scorer (1998); FIBA EuroStar (2007); Greek Cup winner (1995); Greek League MVP (1998); 2× Greek League All-Star (1996 II, 1997); Greek League Hall of Fame (2022); 2× Mister Europa Player of the Year (2001, 2002); Euroscar Player of the Year (2001)

Career statistics
- Points: 13,647 (17.0 ppg)
- Rebounds: 3,782 (4.7 rpg)
- Assists: 1,408 (1.8 apg)
- Stats at NBA.com
- Stats at Basketball Reference
- FIBA Hall of Fame
Medals
Men's basketball
Representing (Federal Republic of Yugoslavia) FR Yugoslavia
FIBA World Cup
Gold medal – first place	2002 Indianapolis
FIBA EuroBasket
Bronze medal – third place	1999 France
Gold medal – first place	2001 Turkey

Predrag Stojaković (Serbian Cyrillic: Предраг Стојаковић, pronounced [ˌprêdraːɡ ˈstôjaːkoʋit͜ɕ]; born 9 June 1977), known by his nickname Peja (Peđa, Пеђа, pronounced [ˈpêd͡ʑa]), is a Serbian former professional basketball player and basketball executive. Stojaković played for five teams in an NBA career that spanned from 1998 to 2011. Standing at 6 ft 10 in (2.08 m), he played mostly as a small forward. Stojaković starred for the Sacramento Kings in the 2000s and was named an NBA All-Star three times during his Kings tenure. He is regarded as one of the greatest shooters in NBA history, having made 1,760 three-point field goals in his career; this total ranked fourth all-time upon his retirement from the NBA. Stojaković won an NBA championship with the Dallas Mavericks in 2011.

After starting in Crvena zvezda and while playing for PAOK, Stojaković was drafted 14th overall by the Sacramento Kings in the 1996 NBA draft. In the NBA, he had a breakthrough season in 2000–01, averaging 20.4 points and 5.8 rebounds while shooting .400 from three-point range in his first season as a starter. He finished second in voting for the 2001 Most Improved Player Award. A three-time All-Star and a member of the 2004 All-NBA Second Team, Stojaković enjoyed success with the Kings, reaching the 2002 Western Conference Finals. He also played for the Indiana Pacers, New Orleans Hornets and Toronto Raptors. Stojaković ended his NBA career in 2011 as a member of the Dallas Mavericks. He won the NBA Three-Point Contest two times during the All-Star Weekend competitions.

Stojaković helped to lead the senior FR Yugoslavian national team to gold medals in the 2001 FIBA EuroBasket and the 2002 FIBA World Championship. Considered one of the greatest European basketball players of all time, Stojaković was named the Euroscar Basketball Player of the Year by the Italian sports newspaper Gazzetta dello Sport and the Mister Europa Player of the Year twice by the Italian sports magazine Superbasket. HoopsHype named Stojaković one of the 75 Greatest International Players Ever in 2021.

On 19 December 2011, Stojaković announced his retirement from professional basketball. On 16 December 2014, the Sacramento Kings retired his number. As an executive, he has held multiple positions in the Sacramento Kings' front office.

== Early life ==
Stojaković was born into an ethnic Serb family to Miodrag and Branka Stojaković in Požega, SR Croatia, SFR Yugoslavia. The Stojakovićs hail from the Papuk mountain region. However, his family later fled to Belgrade, Serbia at the start of the Yugoslav wars.

In 1993, at the age of 16, Stojaković moved to Thessaloniki, Greece. His father stayed behind in his homeland and fought in the Army of the Republic of Serbian Krajina against the Croatian Army. In 1995, he joined his son in Thessaloniki. Many of Stojaković's relatives reside in Serbia.

== Professional career ==
=== Red Star Belgrade (1992–1993) ===
At 15 years of age, Stojaković joined the Crvena zvezda (Red Star Belgrade) basketball club. With Red Star, he played in 2 senior men's level seasons (1992–93 and 1993–94 seasons). With the club, he also won a FR Yugoslav national championship, in the 1992–93 season. In the 1993–94 season, he only played in the FR Yugoslav national cup tournament. With Red Star, he played in a total of 39 games, in which he scored a total of 113 points, for a scoring average of 2.9 points per game.

=== PAOK Thessaloniki (1993–1998) ===
Stojaković moved to Greece in 1993, at the age of 16, and joined the Greek League club PAOK Thessaloniki one year later. With PAOK, he won the 1994–95 Greek Cup tournament. He also played in the European-wide secondary level FIBA European Cup (FIBA Saporta Cup)'s 1995–96 season's Final.

Stojaković scored a memorable last-second three-pointer against Olympiacos, in Piraeus, in a 1998 Greek League playoff semifinals series, which won the game for PAOK, by a score of 58–55. That victory, which ended the five-year reign of Olympiacos as Greek League champions, allowed PAOK to face Panathinaikos in the league's finals series, although the club had a disadvantage in home games, and ultimately lost the five-game series (and the league's championship) 3–2. Stojaković, who was closely guarded throughout the series by his future head coach in New Orleans, Byron Scott, who was wrapping up his basketball playing career, as one of Panathinaikos' key players, did not play at his normal level.

In his final season with PAOK, Stojaković averaged 23.9 points, 4.9 rebounds, 2.5 assists, and 1.2 steals per game in the Greek League, and 20.9 points, 3.6 rebounds, and 1.5 assists per game in the European-wide top level EuroLeague's 1997–98 season.

=== Sacramento Kings (1998–2006) ===
Stojaković was selected by the Sacramento Kings in the first round (14th overall pick) of the 1996 NBA draft while playing in Greece. He continued to play there until the Kings signed him prior to the 1998–99 NBA lockout season. After two seasons on the bench with Sacramento, he had a breakthrough season in 2000–01, averaging 20.4 points and 5.8 rebounds while shooting .400 from three-point range in his first season as a starter. He finished second in voting for the 2001 Most Improved Player Award.

In 2001–02, he played in the NBA All-Star Game for the first time. His scoring average went up to 21.2 ppg, and he reached career highs in shooting percentage (.484) and three-point percentage (.416). His scoring average dropped slightly to 19.2 ppg in 2002–03, but he played again in the All-Star Game. In both seasons, he won the Three-Point Contest conducted during All-Star Weekend. During the '02–03 season, Stojaković was one of twenty-four athletes who signed their likeness to The LEGO Group to be recreated for their LEGO Sports theme, historic for being the first LEGO minifigures with natural skin tones since their creation in 1978.

In 2003–04, Stojaković was again selected as an All-Star, and finished second in the league in scoring with a career-high 24.2 ppg. He finished fourth in MVP voting and was voted on to the All-NBA 2nd Team. He also led the NBA in free-throw percentage (.933) and three-pointers made for the season (240). In 2004–05, he missed 16 games to injury, and was somewhat hampered in several games, but still averaged 20.1 ppg. Stojaković's number 16 was retired by the Sacramento Kings on 16 December 2014.

=== Indiana Pacers (2006) ===
On 25 January 2006 Stojaković was traded to the Indiana Pacers in exchange for forward Ron Artest, ending his eight-year tenure with the Kings. However, he missed four games of their first round playoff series with the New Jersey Nets, all losses.

=== New Orleans Hornets (2006–2010) ===
During the 2006 offseason, he agreed to a deal with the then-New Orleans/Oklahoma City Hornets worth $64 million over five years. On 14 November 2006 Stojaković scored a career-high 42 points against the Charlotte Bobcats, and became the first player in NBA history to open the game with 20 straight points for his team. His strong start to the season was halted by injuries, as a result missing all but the first 13 games of the 2006–07 season.

Stojaković bounced back the following season, starting all 77 games he played in, and was a key contributor in helping the Hornets win a franchise-record 56 games, and their first ever division title. In the first two games of their second round match-up against the defending champion San Antonio Spurs, both wins, Stojaković averaged 23.5 points per game while shooting 63.7% from the three-point line. The Hornets ultimately lost to the Spurs in seven games, ending their run.

The Hornets' core of Chris Paul, Tyson Chandler, David West and Stojaković would keep the Hornets in contention the following year, but injuries and the trade of Chandler forced New Orleans into a team rebuild, making the veteran Stojaković expendable.

=== Toronto Raptors (2010–2011) ===
On 20 November 2010 Stojaković was traded to the Toronto Raptors along with Jerryd Bayless in exchange for Jarrett Jack, Marcus Banks, and David Andersen.

After appearing in only two games, on 20 January 2011, Stojaković was released by the Raptors. He had missed 26 games due to a left knee injury.

=== Dallas Mavericks (2011) ===
On 24 January 2011 Stojaković signed a deal with the Dallas Mavericks. The Mavericks won the NBA championship that year, with Stojaković having a significant supporting role, averaging 7.1 points per game during the Mavericks' playoff run. He scored more than 20 points in two different playoff games for the Mavericks.

On 19 December 2011 Stojaković announced his retirement, citing ongoing back and neck problems that had hindered his play later in his career.

=== Legacy ===
Stojaković is regarded as one of the greatest shooters in NBA history. He made 1,760 three-point field goals in his career which ranked fourth all-time upon his retirement from the NBA.

== Post-playing career ==
In August 2015, Stojaković was appointed director of player personnel and development for the Sacramento Kings. In May 2018, Stojaković was announced as the Kings' assistant general manager. In this role, he served for the Stockton Kings, the Kings' NBA Development League affiliate. On 15 August 2020, the Kings announced that Stojaković had stepped down from the position of assistant general manager.

== National team career ==
As a member of the senior FR Yugoslavia national basketball team, Stojaković earned a bronze medal at the 1999 edition of the FIBA EuroBasket, which was held in France. He also competed at the 2000 edition of the Summer Olympic Games.

He also won gold medals at the 2001 FIBA EuroBasket, which was held in Turkey, and at the 2002 edition of the FIBA World Championship, which was held in Indianapolis, Indiana. Stojaković was named the MVP of the 2001 FIBA EuroBasket, and he was also named a member of the FIBA World Championship All-Tournament Team at Indianapolis, in 2002. Joining him on that All-Tournament Team were fellow NBA stars Manu Ginóbili, Dirk Nowitzki, and Yao Ming, as well as New Zealand's Pero Cameron.

He finished out his national team career at EuroBasket 2003 where the newly formed Serbia and Montenegro finished sixth.

== Personal life ==
Stojaković acquired full Greek citizenship at the age of 17, while he was playing with PAOK in Greece. His name, in Greek transliteration, is Prentragk "Petza" Kinis Stogiakovits (Greek: Πρέντραγκ "Πέτζα" Κίνης Στογιάκοβιτς). Stojaković also speaks Greek.

He is married to Greek model Aleka Kamila. The couple has three children, including Andrej (born 2004), who currently plays basketball for the University of Illinois Fighting Illini. In 2014, the family lived in Glyfada, Greece.

Stojaković served in the Hellenic Army, a mandatory service for each male Greek citizen. He also runs the Peja Stojaković Children's Foundation, which is a charity that is designed to help improve the lives of children in the Balkan countries of Serbia, Montenegro, and Greece.

== NBA career statistics ==
Legend
GP	Games played	GS	Games started	MPG	Minutes per game
FG%	Field goal percentage	3P%	3-point field goal percentage	FT%	Free throw percentage
RPG	Rebounds per game	APG	Assists per game	SPG	Steals per game
BPG	Blocks per game	PPG	Points per game	**Bold**	Career high
†	Won an NBA championship	*	Led the league

=== Regular season ===
Year	Team	GP	GS	MPG	FG%	3P%	FT%	RPG	APG	SPG	BPG	PPG
1998–99	Sacramento	48	1	21.4	.378	.320	.851	3.0	1.5	.9	.1	8.4
1999–2000	Sacramento	74	11	23.6	.448	.375	.882	3.7	1.4	.7	.1	11.9
2000–01	Sacramento	75	75	38.7	.470	.400	.856	5.8	2.2	1.2	.2	20.4
2001–02	Sacramento	71	71	37.3	.484	.416	.876	5.3	**2.5**	1.1	.2	21.2
2002–03	Sacramento	72	72	34.0	.481	.382	.875	5.5	2.0	1.0	.1	19.2
2003–04	Sacramento	**81**	**81**	**40.3**	.480	.433	.927*	**6.3**	2.1	**1.3**	.2	**24.2**
2004–05	Sacramento	66	66	38.4	.444	.402	.920	4.3	2.1	1.2	.2	20.1
2005–06	Sacramento	31	31	37.0	.403	.397	.933	5.3	2.2	.6	.1	16.5
2005–06	Indiana	40	40	36.4	.461	.404	.903	**6.3**	1.7	.7	.2	19.5
2006–07	New Orleans	13	13	32.7	.423	.405	.816	4.2	.8	.6	**.3**	17.8
2007–08	New Orleans	77	77	35.2	.440	.441	.929*	4.3	1.2	.7	.1	16.4
2008–09	New Orleans	61	59	34.2	.399	.378	.894	4.3	1.2	.9	.0	13.3
2009–10	New Orleans	62	55	31.4	.404	.375	.897	3.7	1.5	.8	.1	12.6
2010–11	New Orleans	6	0	14.8	.424	.440	.857	1.0	1.0	.3	.0	7.5
2010–11	Toronto	2	0	11.0	**.700**	**.667**	**1.000**	1.5	.5	.0	.0	10.0
2010–11	Dallas†	25	13	20.2	.429	.400	.938	2.6	.9	.4	.1	8.6
**Career**		804	665	33.5	.450	.401	.895	4.7	1.8	.9	.1	17.0
**All-Star**		3	0	14.7	.364	.385	.000	2.0	1.0	.3	.0	7.0

=== Playoffs ===
Year	Team	GP	GS	MPG	FG%	3P%	FT%	RPG	APG	SPG	BPG	PPG
1999	Sacramento	5	0	21.6	.346	.214	**1.000**	3.8	.4	.6	.0	4.8
2000	Sacramento	5	0	25.8	.400	.462	.667	3.4	.6	.8	.0	8.8
2001	Sacramento	8	8	38.4	.406	.346	.968	6.4	.4	.6	.4	21.6
2002	Sacramento	10	7	33.8	.376	.271	.897	6.3	1.0	.5	.0	14.8
2003	Sacramento	12	**12**	40.5	**.480**	.457	.850	6.9	**2.5**	.8	.4	**23.1**
2004	Sacramento	12	**12**	**43.1**	.384	.315	.897	**7.0**	1.5	**1.8**	.3	17.5
2005	Sacramento	5	5	40.4	.470	.367	.955	5.2	1.4	.8	.2	22.0
2006	Indiana	2	2	25.5	.444	.000	.857	4.5	2.0	.5	**.5**	11.0
2008	New Orleans	12	**12**	37.9	.436	**.549**	.926	5.4	.5	.5	.1	14.1
2009	New Orleans	5	5	32.4	.367	.308	.923	2.8	.4	.8	.2	11.2
2011†	Dallas	**19**	0	18.4	.408	.377	.778	1.7	.4	.6	.1	7.1
**Career**		95	63	32.7	.418	.376	.900	4.9	1.0	.8	.2	14.4

== Awards and achievements ==
- NBA Champion: 2011
- All-NBA Team:
  - Second Team: 2004
- 3× NBA All-Star: 2002, 2003, 2004
- 2× NBA Three-Point Contest Champion: 2002, 2003
- NBA three-point scoring leader: (2004)
- 2× NBA free-throw percentage leader: (2004, 2008)
- All-Time NBA European Second Team: 2022
- 4th in NBA history in career free-throw percentage at .895
- 23rd in NBA history in 3-pointers made with 1,760
- 9th in NBA playoff history in free-throw percentage at .900
- 28th in NBA history in 3-pointers attempted with 4,392
- First player in NBA history to start a game off by scoring 20 consecutive points for his team.
- He and Steve Nash of Phoenix were the only players to rank in the top 25 in both free-throw and 3-point percentage during the '04–'05 and '05–'06 seasons.
- FIBA EuroLeague Top Scorer: 1998
- FIBA EuroStar: 2007
- Greek Cup Winner: 1995
- Greek League MVP: 1998
- 2× Greek League All-Star: 1996 II, 1997
- 2× Greek All-Star Game MVP: 1996 II, 1997
- FR Yugoslav League Best Young Player: 1993
- FIBA EuroBasket All-Tournament Team: 2001
- FIBA EuroBasket MVP: 2001
- Won the 2001 Euroscar, given to the best European basketball player by Italian newspaper La Gazzetta dello Sport.
- Named Mister Europa Player of the Year in 2001 and 2002 by Italian weekly magazine Superbasket.
- No. 16 retired by Sacramento Kings: 2014
- HoopsHype's 75 Greatest International Players Ever: 2021
- Greek Basket League Hall of Fame: 2022

== See also ==
- List of National Basketball Association career 3-point scoring leaders
- List of National Basketball Association career 3-point field goal percentage leaders
- List of National Basketball Association career free throw percentage leaders
- List of National Basketball Association season statistical leaders
- List of National Basketball Association annual free throw percentage leaders
- List of National Basketball Association annual three-point field goals leaders
- List of European basketball players in the United States
- List of Serbian NBA players
