= Ricky Rubio =

Spanish basketball player (born 1990)

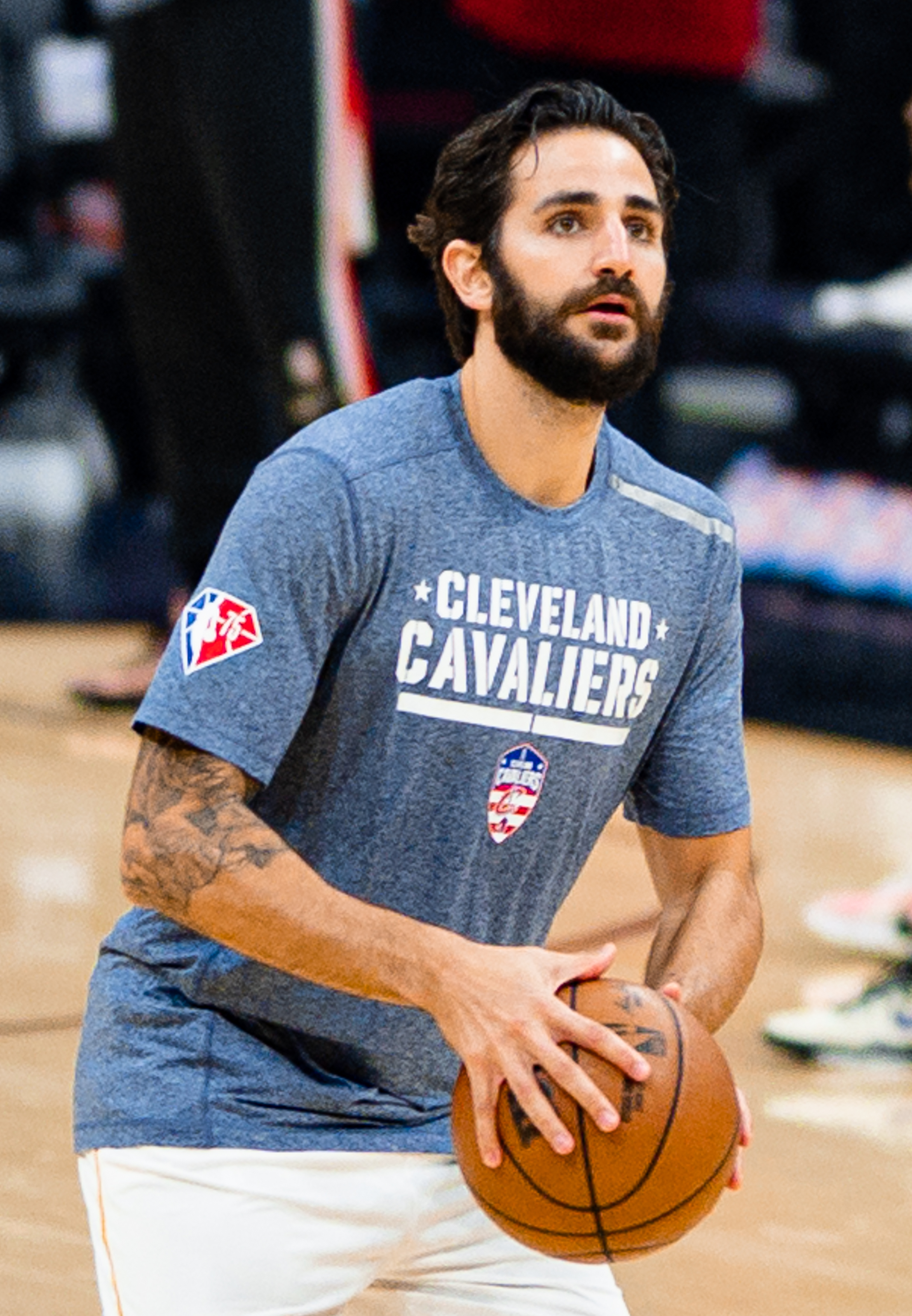
- Rubio with the Cleveland Cavaliers in 2021

No. 9 – Joventut Badalona
- Position: Point guard
- League: Liga ACB

Personal information
- Born: 21 October 1990 (age 36) El Masnou, Spain
- Listed height: 6 ft 2 in (1.88 m)
- Listed weight: 190 lb (86 kg)

Career information
- NBA draft: 2009: 1st round, 5th overall pick
- Drafted by: Minnesota Timberwolves
- Playing career: 2005–present

Career history
- 2005–2009: Joventut Badalona
- 2009–2011: FC Barcelona
- 2011–2017: Minnesota Timberwolves
- 2017–2019: Utah Jazz
- 2019–2020: Phoenix Suns
- 2020–2021: Minnesota Timberwolves
- 2021–2024: Cleveland Cavaliers
- 2024: FC Barcelona
- 2025–present: Joventut Badalona

Career highlights
- NBA All-Rookie First Team (2012); FIBA World Cup MVP (2019); EuroLeague champion (2010); EuroLeague Rising Star (2010); EuroLeague steals leader (2007); EuroCup champion (2008); FIBA EuroChallenge champion (2006); All-FIBA Champions League First Team (2026); Liga ACB champion (2011); 3× Copa del Rey winner (2008, 2010, 2011); Spanish Supercup winner (2026); 2× All-Liga ACB First Team (2008, 2010); All-Liga ACB Second Team (2026); Liga ACB Rising Star (2007); Liga ACB Most Spectacular Player (2010); Spanish Sportsman of the Year (2019); Mister Europa Player of the Year (2008); 3× FIBA Young Player of the Year (2007–2009); FIBA Europe Under-16 Championship MVP (2006)
- Stats at NBA.com
- Stats at Basketball Reference
Medals
Men's basketball
Representing Spain
Summer Olympics
Silver medal – second place	2008 Beijing
Bronze medal – third place	2016 Rio de Janeiro
World Cup
Gold medal – first place	2019 China
EuroBasket
Gold medal – first place	2009 Poland
Gold medal – first place	2011 Lithuania
Bronze medal – third place	2013 Slovenia
Bronze medal – third place	2017 Finland–Israel–Romania–Turkey

Ricard Rubio Vives (born 21 October 1990) is a Spanish professional basketball player for Joventut Badalona of the Liga ACB. He became the youngest player ever to play in the Spanish Liga ACB on 15 October 2005, at age 14. He made his EuroLeague debut on 24 October 2006, a few days after turning 16, making him one of the youngest players to play in the EuroLeague.

A point guard, Rubio was drafted with the fifth pick in the first round of the 2009 NBA draft by the Minnesota Timberwolves, making him the first player born in the 1990s to be drafted by an NBA team. The Timberwolves had an agreement in principle with his Spanish team, DKV Joventut, to buy out his contract, but Rubio backed out of the deal. Joventut later traded his rights to FC Barcelona, and Rubio signed a six-year contract with FC Barcelona the following day. In 2011, Rubio joined the Timberwolves, and spent six seasons in Minnesota before being traded to the Utah Jazz in June 2017. He signed with the Phoenix Suns in July 2019, before returning to Minnesota in 2020. Rubio was traded to the Cleveland Cavaliers in August 2021, but was dealt to the Indiana Pacers a month after suffering a season ending ACL injury in December.

In August 2023, Rubio announced he was taking a break from the sport to prioritise his mental health. In January 2024, he announced that he would be retiring from the NBA.

== Professional career ==
=== Joventut (2005–2009) ===
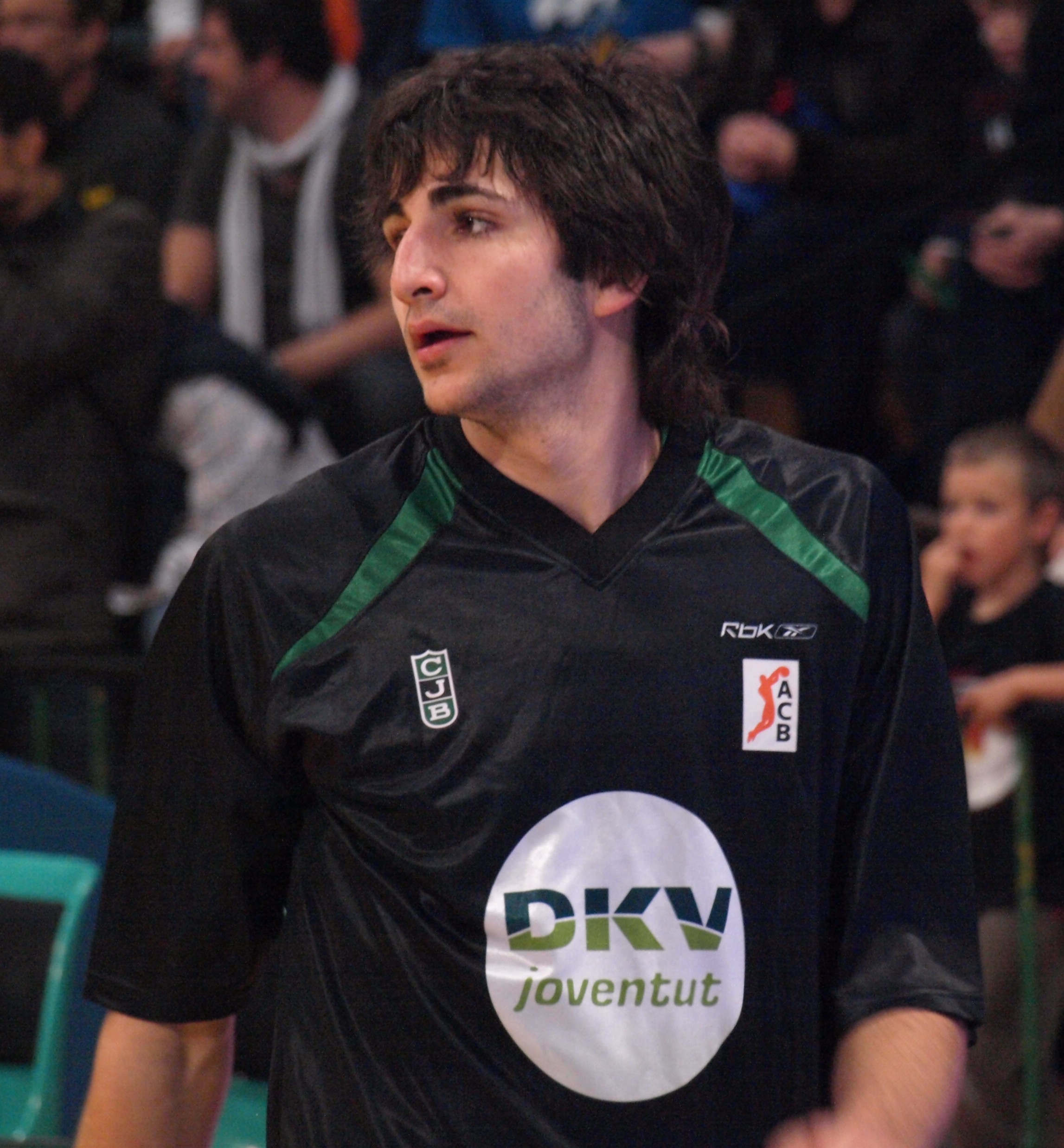
Rubio with Joventut Badalona in 2009

Rubio debuted in the Spanish ACB League in the 2005–06 season with DKV Joventut. Rubio was the youngest player ever to debut in the ACB, at 14 years and 11 months. He won the FIBA EuroChallenge championship with Joventut that year. He led the Spanish ACB League in steals during the 2006–07 season. He also won the Spanish ACB League's Rising Star Award that season. Rubio was also named the FIBA Europe Young Player of the Year in 2007, 2008, and 2009. He made his EuroLeague debut on 24 October 2006, versus Panathinaikos of Athens as Joventut's backup point guard for Elmer Bennett. He became the fifth-youngest EuroLeague player at the time. Rubio averaged 2.8 assists per game in his first season of EuroLeague play. He won the EuroCup championship with Joventut in 2008. He was also voted the Spanish ACB League's best point guard in 2008 and 2010. He won the 2009–10 EuroLeague with FC Barcelona.

Despite his notability, he was carefully shielded. DKV Joventut and Rubio's parents agreed not to make him available for interviews until his 18th birthday on 21 October 2008. The restrictions were ended a few months early once he was selected for the Spain national team that would play at the 2008 Olympics.

Rubio won the 2008 Mr. Europa Award, which was given out yearly by the Italian Superbasket Magazine. In 2009, his club Badalona raised the amount of money his contract paid per year from 80,000 euros net income to 300,000 euros net income. He was named the Defensive Player of the Year for the Spanish ACB League 2008–09 season, and he also led the league in steals that season. Rubio declared himself eligible for the 2009 NBA draft on 20 April 2009. Rubio's agent during that time was Dan Fegan.

=== Barcelona (2009–2011) ===
After the 2009 NBA draft, Rubio played for the FC Barcelona for the next two seasons as agreed upon with the Minnesota Timberwolves. During that time, he helped the team win the EuroLeague Championship in 2010 and the Liga ACB Championship in 2011.

=== Minnesota Timberwolves (2011–2017) ===
On 24 June 2009, the Minnesota Timberwolves acquired the fifth pick in the 2009 NBA draft, Etan Thomas, Darius Songaila and Oleksiy Pecherov from the Washington Wizards, in exchange for Randy Foye and Mike Miller. With the 5th pick, Minnesota selected Rubio, making him the first player born in the 1990s to be drafted with Steph Curry still on the board. The Timberwolves had a total of four first-round picks in the 2009 NBA draft. They used the 6th and 18th picks in the first round and chose two other point guards, Jonny Flynn from Syracuse and Ty Lawson from North Carolina, surprising many in the NBA. Lawson's draft rights were soon traded to the Denver Nuggets. The Timberwolves then used the 28th pick to select Wayne Ellington, a shooting guard from North Carolina.

The following day, Rubio's father told a Spanish media outlet his son might return to Spain for at least one more season. Rubio did not attend an introductory press conference by the Timberwolves. Rubio had a buyout clause in his Joventut contract reported by various media outlets as ranging from $6.6 million to $8.2 million, and Timberwolves general manager David Kahn admitted Rubio would probably have to play one more season in Spain to reduce or avoid the buyout.

On 22 July, the Associated Press reported Rubio was seeking to leave Joventut, regardless of whether he was able to come to the NBA. The report indicated that the ACB powers FC Barcelona and Real Madrid were both interested in signing Rubio if he could not immediately go to the NBA. The main stumbling block to Rubio's NBA move was a clause in the league's collective bargaining agreement that prohibited a team from paying more than $500,000 toward a player's contract buyout. Barça and Real, as ACB clubs, were not subject to this rule and could pay far more toward a buyout. In another development, the St. Paul Pioneer Press reported on 4 August Rubio's representatives had been actively seeking endorsement deals in Minnesota to help finance his buyout (the NBA buyout rules are binding on teams, but not on third parties).

However, on 31 August 2009, ESPN reported Rubio would not come to the NBA until 2011 at the earliest. Joventut expressed a willingness to reduce the buyout, and the Timberwolves apparently had a deal to bring him to the NBA, but in the end Rubio did not feel ready to cross the Atlantic. Rubio issued the following statement:

The reason leading me to take this next step is to have a period of preparation to better take the challenge of the NBA in better conditions as a player. The Minnesota Timberwolves continue to be my first option and I wish to play with them in the near future.

Kahn believed Rubio and his family were being pressured by the Spanish media, his national teammates, and people in his hometown to stay in Spain, adding, "It's just been a tough summer. From an 18-year-old's perspective and his family's perspective, it was very nerve-racking".

ESPN reported his original buyout with Joventut was €5.7 million ($8.1 million) in both 2009 and 2010. Barça bought out Rubio's contract for €3.5 million ($5.0 million), and announced on September 1 he had signed a six-year deal with the club. The contract gave him the option to go to the NBA after the 2010–11 season, with ESPN reporting the buyout at that time would be a more manageable $1.4 million (of which the Timberwolves could pay $500,000).

==== 2011–12 season ====
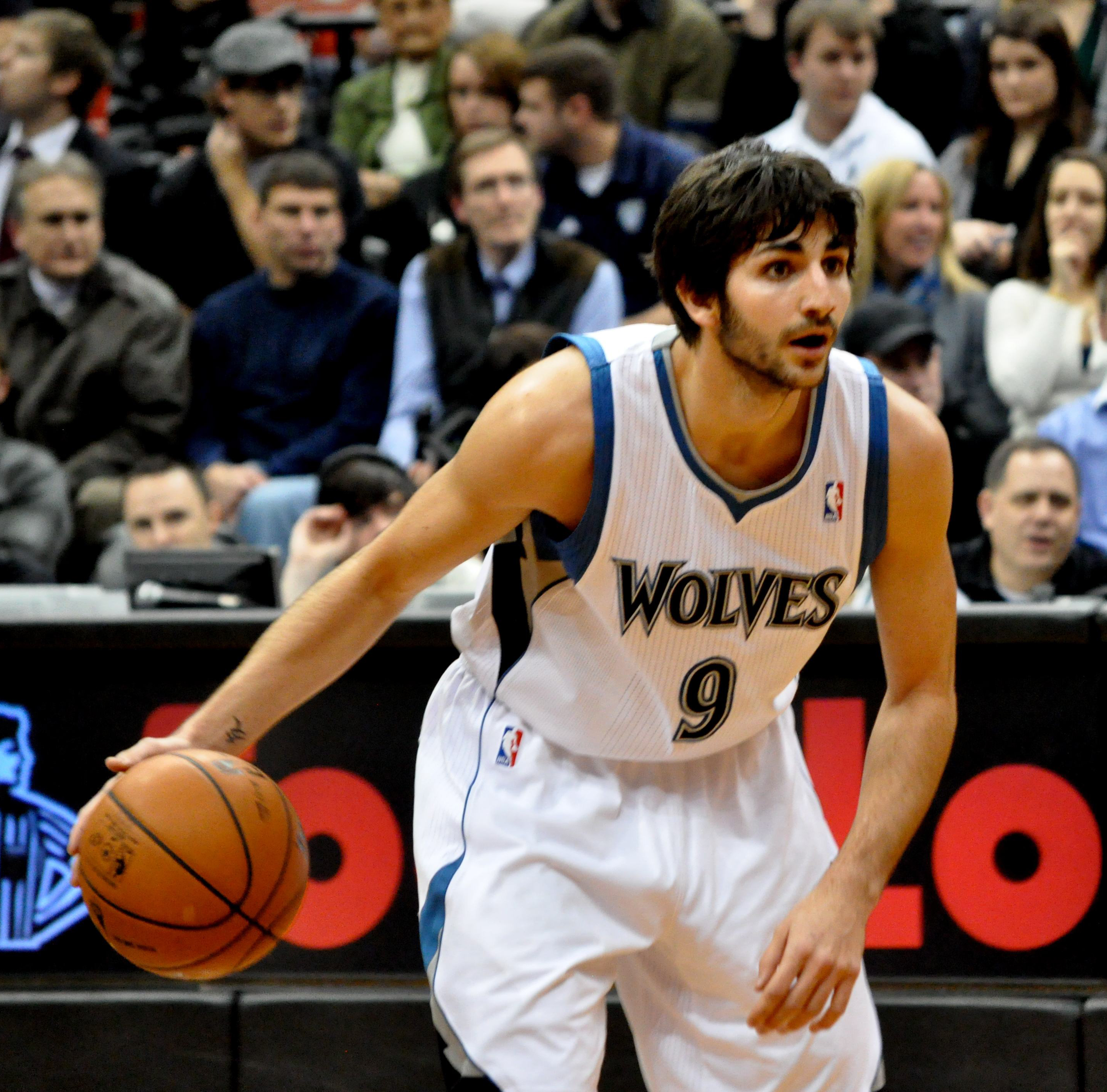
Rubio with the Minnesota Timerwolves in 2012

On 1 June 2011, sources reported Rubio had "reached an agreement with Minnesota to join the Timberwolves" for the 2011–12 NBA season. Rubio arrived off a plane in Minnesota to a barrage of fans waiting to welcome him to the United States. On 17 June 2011, Rubio held a press conference announcing he had signed with Minnesota.

Becoming the 10th Spanish NBA player, Rubio made his regular season debut on 26 December 2011, to a sellout crowd at the Target Center, the team's first sellout crowd since the 2007–08 season. Rubio recorded 6 points, 5 rebounds and 6 assists in 26 minutes in a 4-point loss to the Oklahoma City Thunder. He was named Western Conference Rookie of the Month after the first month of the season. In February, Rubio and teammate Derrick Williams were selected to participate in the 2012 Rising Stars challenge. Rubio was drafted to Team Shaq, while Williams was drafted to Team Chuck. Rubio scored 22 points on 19 February 2012 in a win over the Philadelphia 76ers. In a loss to the Los Angeles Lakers on 9 March 2012, Rubio tore his ACL and his lateral collateral ligament defending Kobe Bryant. He missed the rest of the season. Rubio finished second in Rookie of the Year voting, trailing only Cleveland Cavaliers rookie Kyrie Irving. Rubio had averaged 10.6 points, 8.2 assists and 2.2 steals in 41 games.

==== 2012–13 season ====
Rubio returned from his injury on 15 December 2012, in an overtime victory over the Dallas Mavericks, playing for 19 minutes and totaling 9 assists and 8 points. He then recorded his first career triple-double with 21 points, 13 rebounds and 12 assists in a win over the San Antonio Spurs on 13 March 2013. Rubio almost recorded his second career triple-double in a loss to the Memphis Grizzlies on March 30 with 23 points, 10 rebounds and 9 assists. Then on 13 April, he recorded a then career-high 24 points, 10 assists, 5 rebounds and 5 steals in a win over the Phoenix Suns. Rubio finished the 2012–13 season with averages of 10.7 points, 7.3 assists and 2.4 steals per game. He also finished second in steals per game, behind Chris Paul.

==== 2013–14 season ====
On 11 November 2013, Rubio recorded his second career triple-double with 12 points, 14 assists and 10 rebounds in a 113–90 win over the Los Angeles Lakers.

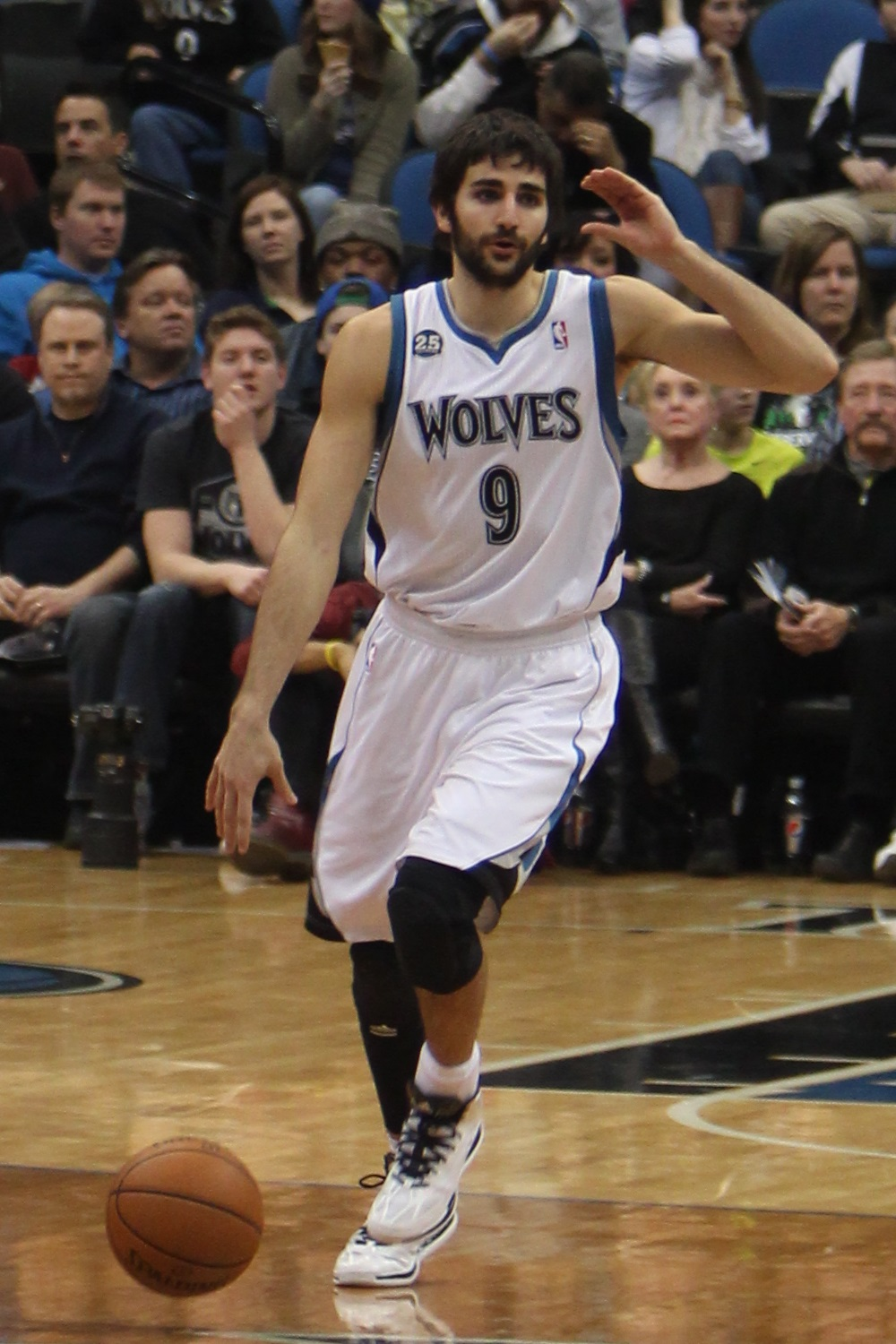
Rubio with the Timberwolves in 2014

On 19 February 2014, Rubio recorded a career-high 17 assists, along with 6 points, 7 rebounds and 2 steals, in a 104–91 win over the Indiana Pacers. Rubio also tied the Timberwolves' franchise record with his 17 assists. On 19 March 2014, Rubio recorded his third career triple-double with 22 points, 15 assists and 10 rebounds in a 123–122 overtime win over the Dallas Mavericks. On 28 March 2014, Rubio tied Tyrone Corbin for the Wolves season-record in steals at 175 with his one steal in a 143–107 win over the Los Angeles Lakers. Two days later, he passed that record when he recorded 2 steals against the Brooklyn Nets.

==== 2014–15 season ====
On 31 October 2014, Rubio signed a four-year, $56 million contract extension with the Timberwolves. On 1 November 2014, he was ruled out indefinitely after he severely sprained his left ankle in the 7 November game loss to the Orlando Magic. Rubio returned to action on 2 February 2015 against the Dallas Mavericks, recording 10 points and 4 assists in a 100–94 loss. On 2 March 2015, he recorded his fourth career triple-double with 18 points, 11 assists and 12 rebounds in a loss to the Los Angeles Clippers. He later underwent surgery on his ankle in April 2015.

==== 2015–16 season ====
On 28 October 2015, Rubio scored a then career-high 28 points in a season opening win over the Los Angeles Lakers. He later missed four games with a sore left knee, returning to action on 17 November. On 16 December, he recorded a near quadruple-double with 12 assists, 10 rebounds, 9 points and 8 steals in a loss to the New York Knicks. On 30 December, he tied a career high with 17 assists in a 94–80 win over the Utah Jazz. Having recorded 14 assists two nights prior in a loss to the San Antonio Spurs, Rubio became the first Wolves player with at least 14 assists in consecutive games since Terrell Brandon did so in April 1999. On 11 March 2016, Rubio's three-pointer with 0.2 seconds remaining lifted the Timberwolves to a 99–96 win over the Oklahoma City Thunder. He finished with 13 points and 12 assists for his eighth double-double of the season, as the Timberwolves snapped a 10-game losing streak against the Thunder. On 14 March against the Phoenix Suns, for the fourth time in his career, Rubio had a 17-assist effort.

==== 2016–17 season ====
On 11 January 2017, in a win over the Houston Rockets, Rubio had a 17-assist effort for the fifth time in his career. Rubio also passed Sam Mitchell to move into fourth place on the team's career games played list with 292. On 30 January 2017, he made a then career-high six three-pointers to lead the Timberwolves to a 111–105 overtime victory over the Orlando Magic. He finished with 22 points, eight rebounds and eight assists. On 4 March 2017, he recorded his fifth career triple-double with 11 points, 13 rebounds and 10 assists in a 97–90 overtime loss to the San Antonio Spurs. On 13 March 2017, Rubio scored 22 points and broke his own franchise record with 19 assists in a 119–104 win over the Washington Wizards. Two days later, he had a season-high 23 points in a 117–104 loss to the Boston Celtics. On 30 March 2017, Rubio had a then career-high 33 points, 10 assists and five rebounds in a 119–104 win over the Lakers.

=== Utah Jazz (2017–2019) ===
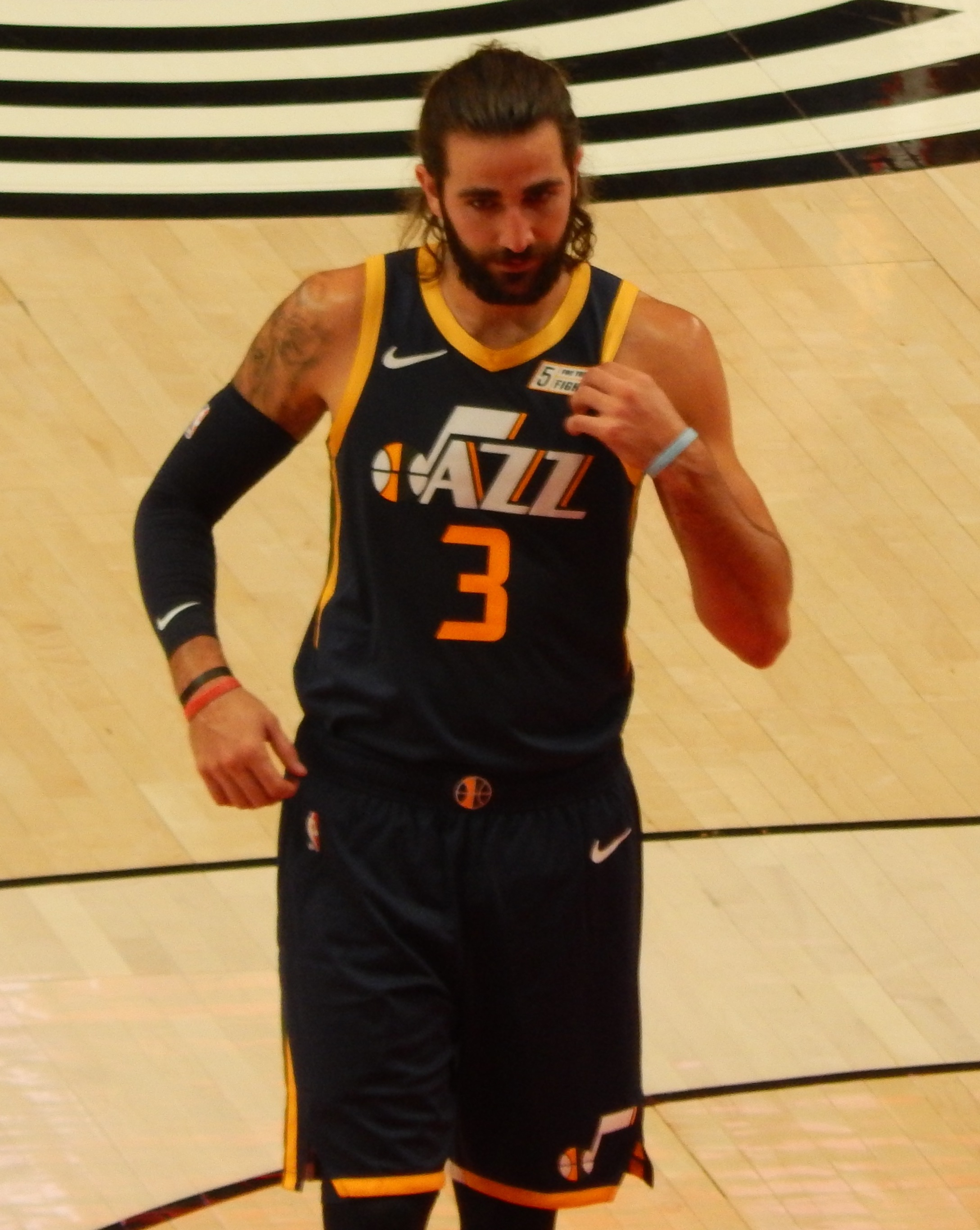
Rubio with the Utah Jazz in 2018

On 30 June 2017, Rubio was traded to the Utah Jazz in exchange for a 2018 first-round draft pick. On 1 November 2017, Rubio scored a season-high 30 points in a 112–103 overtime win over the Portland Trail Blazers. On 3 February 2018, he set a new season high with 34 points in a 120–111 win over the San Antonio Spurs. On 11 March 2018, he had 30 points, 10 rebounds and seven assists in a 116–99 win over the New Orleans Pelicans. In Game 3 of the Jazz's first-round playoff series against the Oklahoma City Thunder, Rubio had 26 points, 11 rebounds and 10 assists, as the Jazz took a 2–1 lead in the series with a 115–102 win. Rubio's triple-double was the first by a Jazz player in the postseason since John Stockton in the 2001 playoffs against Dallas. In Game 6, Rubio suffered a left hamstring injury that rendered him out for the remainder of the playoffs.

=== Phoenix Suns (2019–2020) ===
On 8 July 2019, Rubio signed with the Phoenix Suns on a three-year, $51 million contract. On 23 October, Rubio put up 11 points and 11 assists in a 124–95 win over the Sacramento Kings. His 11 assists tied Elliot Perry as the only players to put up a double-double with 11 assists in a Suns debut game. On 16 December, Rubio put up his first triple-double with the Suns with 10 points, 11 rebounds, and 14 assists in a 111–110 loss to the Portland Trail Blazers. On 24 February 2020, Rubio put up 22 points, 11 assists, 7 steals, and 6 rebounds in a 131–111 win over his former team, the Utah Jazz. He became the first Suns player to put up at least 20+ points, 10+ assists, and 7+ steals in a game since Kevin Johnson back in 1996. Rubio recorded his second triple-double with the Suns on 8 March with 25 points, 13 rebounds, and 13 assists in a 140–131 win over the Milwaukee Bucks.

On 23 June 2020, the Suns reported that two of their own players tested positive for COVID-19. In a 22 July interview, Rubio revealed himself as one of the two players to test positive for the COVID-19 virus. However, Rubio would rejoin the team in the 2020 NBA Bubble removed from the virus during the team's scrimmage games for the resumed season, eventually returning on 31 July as a starter in a 125–112 win over the Washington Wizards.

=== Second stint with Minnesota (2020–2021) ===
On 16 November 2020, Rubio was traded to the Oklahoma City Thunder alongside Jalen Lecque, Kelly Oubre Jr., Ty Jerome, and a 2022 first-round draft pick in a trade for Chris Paul and Abdel Nader. Two days later, Rubio and the draft rights to Jaden McDaniels and Leandro Bolmaro were traded to the Minnesota Timberwolves in exchange for James Johnson, the draft rights to Aleksej Pokuševski, and Minnesota's 2024 second-round selection.

=== Cleveland Cavaliers (2021–2024) ===
Rubio with the Cleveland Cavaliers in 2021

On 3 August 2021, Rubio was traded to the Cleveland Cavaliers in exchange for Taurean Prince, a 2022 second-round pick, and cash considerations. On 7 November, Rubio scored 37 points and made eight three-pointers, both career highs, alongside 10 assists in a 126–109 win over the New York Knicks. On 13 December, Rubio recorded his 5,000th career assist. On 28 December, he tore his left ACL during a game between the New Orleans Pelicans, and the next day, it was confirmed to be a season-ending injury.

On 7 February 2022, Rubio was traded to the Indiana Pacers along with a lottery-protected 2022 first-round pick, a 2022 second-round pick and a 2027 second-round pick in exchange for Caris LeVert and a 2022 second-round pick. Due to his knee injury, he never played a game for the team.

On 8 July 2022, Rubio, still injured, returned to the Cleveland Cavaliers on a three-year, $18 million contract.

On 12 January 2023, Rubio made his return from injury, putting up nine points in ten minutes in his season debut, in a 119–113 win over the Portland Trail Blazers.

On 5 August 2023, Rubio decided to pause his career so he could focus on his mental health.

On 4 January 2024, Rubio and the Cavaliers agreed to a contract buyout. Later that same day, Rubio announced on social media that he would be leaving the NBA .

=== Return to Barcelona (2024) ===
On 6 February 2024, Rubio signed with FC Barcelona for the remainder of the season. He played 28 games in the ACB and EuroLeague, mainly in a reserve role, but did not re-sign.

=== Return to Joventut (2025–present) ===
On 22 July 2025, Joventut Badalona announced the return of Rubio, 16 years after leaving his childhood club. He was named to the FIBA Champions League First Team for the 2025-26 and helped Joventut to the 2026 Spanish Supercopa.

On 30 July 2026, Rubio re–signed with Badalona on a one–year contract.

== National team career ==
=== Junior national team ===
In August 2006, Rubio led the rising junior Spain national team to the FIBA Europe Under-16 Championship. During the tournament Rubio achieved two triple-doubles and a quadruple-double. In the 110–106 double overtime finale victory over Russia, Rubio scored 51 points, the first player to do so in FIBA junior tournaments since Luol Deng (in 2001), grabbed 24 rebounds, made 12 assists, and stole the ball 7 times. He also forced the first overtime with a three-point, buzzer-beating shot from mid-court. Rubio was then named the Most Valuable Player of the tournament after leading it in points, rebounds, assists and steals.

=== Senior national team ===
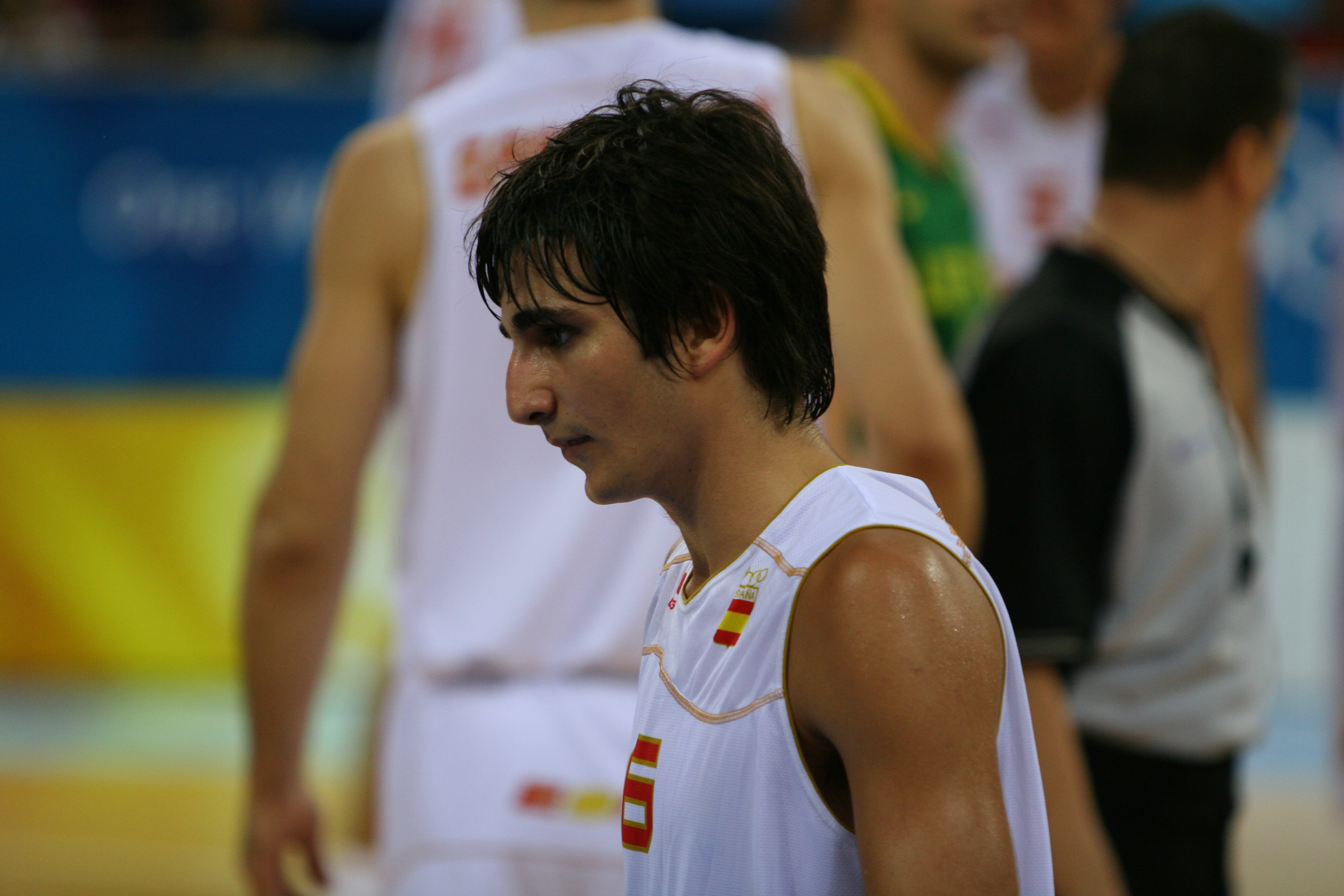
Rubio with Spain at the 2008 Olympics

The young Spaniard competed internationally with the senior Spain National Team at the 2008 Beijing Summer Olympics. The team included current and former NBA players such as Pau Gasol, José Calderón, Rudy Fernández, Marc Gasol, Raúl López, Jorge Garbajosa, and Juan Carlos Navarro.

He played in the 2008 Olympics Basketball Tournament's gold medal game against the USA's "Redeem Team", and at 17 became the youngest player in an Olympic basketball final. The team took the silver medal after a loss at the gold, 118–107. The team continued international play at the 2009 EuroBasket in Poland, where Spain defeated Serbia for the gold medal, 85–63. Rubio's contribution averaged 22.7 minutes, 5.9 points, 2.2 rebounds, 3.9 assists, and 1.4 steals per game.

Rubio led Spain to a gold medal in the 2019 FIBA Basketball World Cup in China. They beat Argentina in the final, 95–75. Rubio was chosen as one of the FIBA World Cup All-Star Five alongside Serbian's Bogdan Bogdanovic, France's Evan Fournier, Spain's Marc Gasol, and Argentina's Luis Scola. He was also named the World Cup MVP. Rubio was named the Spanish Sportsman of the Year, in 2019.

In the Tokyo 2020 Olympics he broke the record for most points scored against Team USA with 38 points. The previous record was 35 points by Butch Lee in the 1976 Montreal Olympics.

== Player profile ==
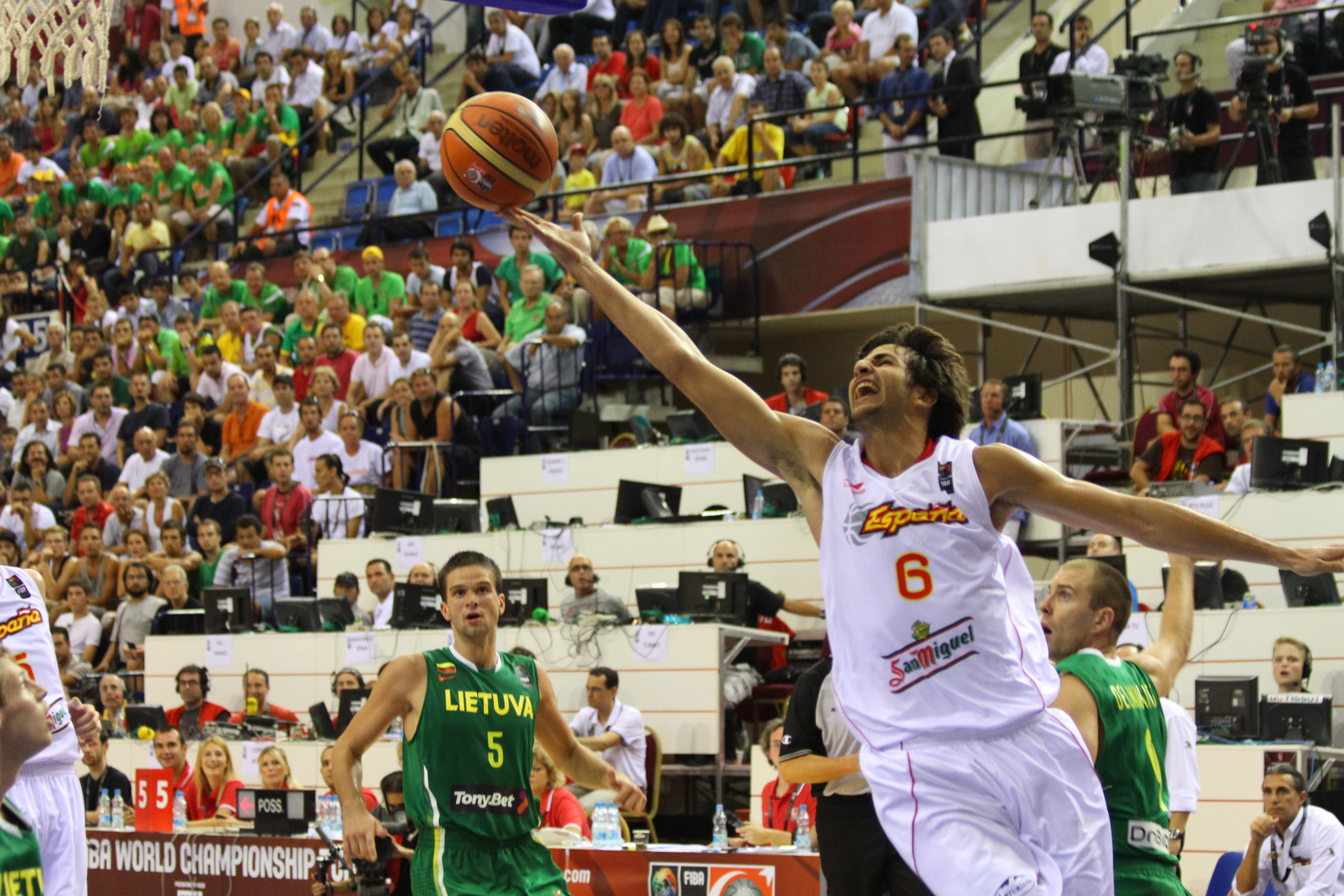
Rubio with Spain in 2010

Rubio was regarded by some as the best European guard prospect ever. Rubio has been compared by some to Pete Maravich.

== Personal life ==
In May 2016, Rubio's mother Tona Vives died at the age of 56. He has a sister named Laia. On 14 January 2020, Rubio's wife Sara gave birth to their son.

== Awards and accomplishments ==
=== Joventut ===
- Spanish King's Cup: 2008
- FIBA EuroChallenge: 2006
- ULEB Cup: 2008
- Catalan League: 2005, 2007, 2008

=== FC Barcelona Basquet ===
- Liga ACB: 2010–11
- Spanish King's Cup: 2010, 2011
- EuroLeague: 2010
- Spanish Supercup: 2009, 2010
- Catalan League: 2009, 2010

=== Spain junior national team ===
- 2005 FIBA Europe Under-16 Championship: Bronze
- 2006 FIBA Europe Under-16 Championship: Gold

=== Spain senior national team ===
- 2008 Summer Olympics: Silver
- 2009 EuroBasket: Gold
- 2011 EuroBasket: Gold
- 2013 EuroBasket: Bronze
- 2016 Summer Olympics: Bronze
- 2017 EuroBasket: Bronze
- 2019 World Cup : Gold

=== Personal awards ===
- MVP of the 2006 FIBA Europe Under-16 Championship: he averaged 22.3 points, 12.8 rebounds, 7.1 assists, 6.5 steals. In the final, accumulated 51 points, 24 rebounds, 12 assists and 7 steals.
- 2× led the Liga ACB in steals: (2007, 2009)
- Won the Spanish ACB League Rising Star Award: (2007)
- 3× FIBA European Young Player of the Year: (2007, 2008, 2009)
- 2× All-Spanish ACB League Team: (2008, 2010)
- Mister Europa Player of the Year: (2008)
- Spanish ACB League Defensive Player of the Year: (2009)
- Catalan League MVP: (2009)
- EuroLeague Rising Star: (2010)
- ACB Most Spectacular Player: (2010)
- NBA All-Rookie First Team: (2012)
- FIBA World Cup All-Tournament Team: (2019)
- FIBA World Cup MVP: (2019)
- Spanish Sportsman of the Year: (2019)
- FIBA Summer Olympics All-Star Five: (2020)

== Career statistics ==
Legend
GP	Games played	GS	Games started	MPG	Minutes per game
FG%	Field-goal percentage	3P%	3-point field-goal percentage	FT%	Free-throw percentage
RPG	Rebounds per game	APG	Assists per game	SPG	Steals per game
BPG	Blocks per game	PPG	Points per game	PIR	Performance index rating
**Bold**	Career high

=== NBA ===
==== Regular season ====
Year	Team	GP	GS	MPG	FG%	3P%	FT%	RPG	APG	SPG	BPG	PPG
2011–12	Minnesota	41	31	**34.2**	.357	.340	.803	4.2	8.2	2.2	**.2**	10.6
2012–13	Minnesota	57	47	29.7	.360	.293	.799	4.0	7.3	**2.4**	.1	10.7
2013–14	Minnesota	**82**	**82**	32.2	.381	.331	.802	4.2	8.6	2.3	.1	9.5
2014–15	Minnesota	22	22	31.5	.356	.255	.803	**5.7**	8.8	1.7	.0	10.3
2015–16	Minnesota	76	76	30.6	.374	.326	.847	4.3	8.7	2.1	.1	10.1
2016–17	Minnesota	75	75	32.9	.402	.306	**.891**	4.1	**9.1**	1.7	.1	11.1
2017–18	Utah	77	77	29.3	**.418**	.352	.866	4.6	5.3	1.6	.1	**13.1**
2018–19	Utah	68	67	27.9	.404	.311	.855	3.6	6.1	1.3	.1	12.7
2019–20	Phoenix	65	65	31.0	.415	**.361**	.863	4.7	8.8	1.4	**.2**	13.0
2020–21	Minnesota	68	51	26.1	.388	.308	.867	3.3	6.4	1.4	.1	8.6
2021–22	Cleveland	34	8	28.5	.363	.339	.854	4.1	6.6	1.4	**.2**	**13.1**
2022–23	Cleveland	33	2	17.2	.343	.256	.800	2.1	3.5	.8	**.2**	5.2
Career		698	603	29.6	.388	.324	.843	4.1	7.4	1.8	.1	10.8

==== Playoffs ====
Year	Team	GP	GS	MPG	FG%	3P%	FT%	RPG	APG	SPG	BPG	PPG
2018	Utah	**6**	**6**	30.2	.354	**.313**	.783	**7.3**	7.0	1.3	**.5**	14.0
2019	Utah	5	5	**33.6**	**.424**	.200	**.850**	3.2	**8.6**	**2.4**	.2	**15.4**
2023	Cleveland	3	0	5.7	.000	–	–	2.0	1.0	.3	–	0.0
Career		14	11	26.1	.384	.269	.814	4.7	6.3	1.5	.3	11.5

=== EuroLeague ===
†	Denotes season in which Rubio won the EuroLeague
*	Led the league

Year	Team	GP	GS	MPG	FG%	3P%	FT%	RPG	APG	SPG	BPG	PPG	PIR
2006–07	Joventut Badalona	16	0	18.9	.348	.167	.767	2.4	2.8	**3.2***	**.1**	3.6	7.7
2008–09	Joventut Badalona	5	2	13.3	.300	.333	.625	2.4	2.8	1.8	—	2.4	6.2
2009–10†	Barcelona	**22***	**22***	20.9	**.370**	**.358**	**.893**	2.9	4.1	1.4	.0	**6.8**	**10.7**
2010–11	Barcelona	20	17	**22.7**	.310	.224	.836	**3.3**	3.5	1.6	**.1**	6.5	9.6
2023–24	Barcelona	13	3	17.2	.274	.182	.852	3.2	**4.3**	1.4	—	4.7	8.0
Career		76	44	19.8	.328	.262	.835	2.9	3.6	1.9	.0	5.4	9.0

=== EuroCup ===
Year	Team	GP	GS	MPG	FG%	3P%	FT%	RPG	APG	SPG	BPG	PPG	PIR
2007–08	Joventut Badalona	16	10	20.9	.531	.360	.771	3.4	4.5	2.4	.1	7.6	12.9
Career		16	10	20.9	.531	.360	.771	3.4	4.5	2.4	.1	7.6	12.9

=== Domestic leagues ===
Year	Team	League	GP	MPG	FG%	3P%	FT%	RPG	APG	SPG	BPG	PPG
2005–06	(Spain) Joventut Badalona	ACB	14	7.8	.474	.667	.700	1.1	.7	1.0	.1	2.6
2006–07	(Spain) Joventut Badalona	ACB	43	19.2	.382	.258	.691	2.6	2.1	1.9	.0	4.5
2007–08	(Spain) Joventut Badalona	ACB	39	23.2	.363	.265	.794	3.3	3.9	2.0	.3	10.2
2008–09	(Spain) Joventut Badalona	ACB	25	22.7	.400	.417	.806	2.7	5.8	2.2	.3	9.8
2009–10	(Spain) Barcelona	ACB	42	20.4	.404	.366	.767	2.7	4.3	1.9	.2	6.4
2010–11	(Spain) Barcelona	ACB	42	21.7	.320	.268	.779	3.2	3.9	1.6	.1	4.7
2023–24	(Spain) Barcelona	ACB	15	18.4	.377	.292	.886	3.1	4.1	1.1	.1	6.0

== See also ==
- List of European basketball players in the United States
- List of youngest EuroLeague players
