= FIBA Europe Men's Player of the Year Award =

The FIBA Europe Men's Player of the Year Award was an annual official FIBA Europe award for the Player of the Year (POY), that was inaugurated in the year 2005, and bestowed until 2014. The winner was a basketball player who had European citizenship, and whose performances with his sports club and/or national team throughout the year had reached the highest level of excellence. All players with European citizenship, regardless of where they played in the world, qualified for the award, including NBA players. Players did not have to play in any FIBA competitions in order to be eligible.

The winner received the prize, after winning a vote of both fans and a panel of basketball experts, media members, and coaches, from twenty five countries. Consequently, the legitimacy of the award was somewhat higher than Superbasket magazine's old Mister Europa Award, Gazzetta dello Sport's Euroscar Award, and Eurobasket.com's All-Europe Player of the Year award, which did not, or still do not include the fan vote. That being specified, the importance of the former awards relies on their tradition, as their inception occurred in 1976, 1979, and 2002 respectively. All in all, the laureates are often the same on all four lists, with all of them representing many of the biggest European basketball stars since the mid-1970s.

== Winners ==
FIBA Europe Player of the Year
- Sport: Basketball

History
- First award: 2005
- Editions: 10
- First winner: (Germany) Dirk Nowitzki
- Most wins: (Spain) Pau Gasol (2) (Germany) Dirk Nowitzki (2) (Russia) Andrei Kirilenko (2) (France) Tony Parker (2)
- Most recent: (France) Tony Parker (2014)

If a winner played for more than one club team in the calendar year of his award, all teams are listed in chronological order.

=== FIBA Europe Men's Players of the Year ===
Year	Men's Players of the Year	Club(s)
2005	(Germany) Dirk Nowitzki	(United States) Dallas Mavericks
2006	(Greece) Theo Papaloukas	(Russia) CSKA Moscow
2007	(Russia) Andrei Kirilenko	(United States) Utah Jazz
2008	(Spain) Pau Gasol	(United States) Memphis Grizzlies & (United States) Los Angeles Lakers
2009	(Spain) Pau Gasol (2×)	(United States) Los Angeles Lakers
2010	(Serbia) Miloš Teodosić	(Greece) Olympiacos
2011	(Germany) Dirk Nowitzki (2×)	(United States) Dallas Mavericks
2012	(Russia) Andrei Kirilenko (2×)	(Russia) CSKA Moscow & (United States) Minnesota Timberwolves
2013	(France) Tony Parker	(United States) San Antonio Spurs
2014	(France) Tony Parker (2×)	(United States) San Antonio Spurs

== See also ==
- EuroLeague Player Of the Year
- FIBA Europe Young Men's Player of the Year Award
- Euroscar
- Mr. Europa
- EuroLeague MVP
- EuroLeague Final Four MVP
- EuroLeague Player Of the Year, Group Stage MVP, and Top 16 Stage MVP
