= Dino Meneghin =

Italian basketball player (born 1950)

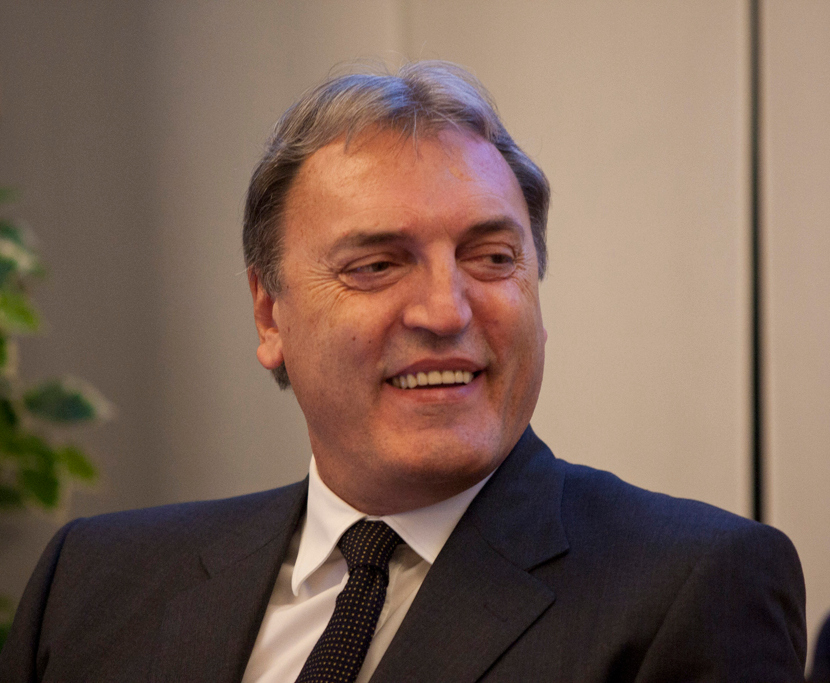
- Meneghin in 2010

Personal information
- Born: 18 January 1950 (age 76) Alano di Piave, Italy
- Listed height: 6 ft 9 in (2.06 m)
- Listed weight: 243 lb (110 kg)

Career information
- NBA draft: 1970: 11th round, 182nd overall pick
- Drafted by: Atlanta Hawks
- Playing career: 1966–1994
- Position: Center

Career history
- 1966–1981: Pallacanestro Varese
- 1981–1990: Olimpia Milano
- 1990–1993: Pallacanestro Trieste
- 1993–1994: Olimpia Milano

Career highlights
- 4× FIBA Intercontinental Cup champion (1967, 1970, 1973, 1987); 7× EuroLeague champion (1970, 1972, 1973, 1975, 1976, 1987, 1988); 3× FIBA European Selection (1975, 1978, 1980); 2× Mister Europa (1980, 1983); Euroscar (1983); 2× FIBA Saporta Cup champion (1967, 1980); FIBA Korać Cup champion (1985); 12× Italian League champion (1969–1971, 1973, 1974, 1977, 1978, 1982, 1985–1987, 1989); 6× Italian Cup winner (1969–1971, 1973, 1986, 1987); FIBA's 50 Greatest Players (1991); Gigantes del Basket's Best European Player of All-Time (1991); Italian Basketball Hall of Fame (2006); 50 Greatest EuroLeague Contributors (2008); Walk of Fame of Italian sport (2015); No. 11 retired by Olimpia Milano (2019)
- Stats at Basketball Reference
- Basketball Hall of Fame
- FIBA Hall of Fame
Medals
Men's basketball
Representing Italy
Summer Olympic Games
Silver medal – second place	1980 Moscow
FIBA EuroBasket
Bronze medal – third place	1971 West Germany
Bronze medal – third place	1975 Yugoslavia
Gold medal – first place	1983 France
FIBA European Championship for Juniors
Bronze medal – third place	1966 Italy	Under-18
Bronze medal – third place	1968 Spain	Under-18

Dino Meneghin (Italian pronunciation: [ˈdiːno meneˈɡin], Venetian: [meneˈɡiŋ]; born 18 January 1950) is an Italian former professional basketball player. He is widely considered to be the best Italian player ever, as well as one of Europe's all-time greats. A 2.06 m (6 ft 9 in) tall center, Meneghin was born in Alano di Piave, Veneto (northeast Italy). On 20 November 1966, when he was 16 years old, he played in his first game in the Italian League, with Ignis Varese. He played the last game of his career at the age of 45.

He holds the record for the most EuroLeague championships won by a player, with seven, when counting all formats of the competition's history, dating back to the inaugural 1958 season. In December 1991, the Spanish basketball magazine Gigantes del Basket, voted Meneghin the Best European Player of All-Time. In 2003, Meneghin became a Basketball Hall of Fame player. In 2006, he became a member of the Italian Basketball Hall of Fame. In 2010, he became a FIBA Hall of Fame player. Meneghin was inducted into the Walk of Fame of Italian sport in May 2015.

== Professional career ==
In total, Meneghin played in 836 games and scored 8,560 points in the Italian League championship. Meneghin became the second player from a European league to be drafted by an NBA team, when the Atlanta Hawks manager Marty Blake selected him with a late-round pick in the 1970 NBA draft. He never played in the US, however.

In 1980 and 1983, he was elected European Player of the Year: Mr. Europa, and he also won the Euroscar European Player of the Year award in 1983. In December 1991, he was named the greatest European basketball player in history by Gigante del Basket, which is a Spanish basketball magazine.

One of the greatest records of his career is his number of Finals appearances in the FIBA European Champions Cup (EuroLeague). He played in 10 consecutive finals with Pallacanestro Varese, winning 5; and later in 2 more consecutive finals with Olimpia Milano, winning both. Finally, before his playing career ended, Meneghin played in the Italian League against his son, Andrea, who was also a great international player.

On 5 September 2003, Meneghin became the second Italian player to enter into the Basketball Hall of Fame, after Cesare Rubini, who served Olimpia Milano, both as player and coach between the 1940s and the 1970s.

On 28 October 2019, 25 years after he last played professionally, Olimpia Milano retired the number 11 in honor of Meneghin. The number 11 matched the number of seasons that he had played with the Italian club.

== National team career ==
With the senior Italian national basketball team, Meneghin played in 271 games, and totaled 2,847 points scored. With Italy, he won the bronze medal at both the 1971 FIBA EuroBasket and the 1975 FIBA EuroBasket. He also won the silver medal at the 1980 Summer Olympics, and the gold medal at the 1983 FIBA EuroBasket.

== Basketball executive career ==
After he finishded his professional basketball club playing career, Meneghin became a basketball executive. He was the president of the Italian Basketball Federation (FIP), and also worked for the Italian League basketball club Olimpia Milano.

== Personal life ==
Dino Meneghin is the father of Andrea Meneghin, who also played professional basketball. Andrea played against his father, during the latter's last season as a pro.

== Honours and awards ==
=== Clubs ===
- 4× FIBA World Cup for Clubs champion: (1967, 1970, 1973, 1987)
- 7× FIBA European Champions Cup (EuroLeague) champion: (1970, 1972, 1973, 1975, 1976, 1987, 1988)
- 2× FIBA European Cup Winners Cup (Saporta Cup) champion: (1967, 1980)
- FIBA Korać Cup champion: (1985)
- 12× Italian League champion: (1969–1971, 1973, 1974, 1977, 1978, 1982, 1985, 1986, 1987, 1989)
- 6× Italian Cup winner: (1969, 1970, 1971, 1973, 1986, 1987)

=== Italian senior national team ===
- 1971 FIBA EuroBasket: Bronze
- 1975 FIBA EuroBasket: Bronze
- 1980 Summer Olympic Games: Silver
- 1983 FIBA EuroBasket: Gold

=== Individual ===
- EuroLeague Finals Top Scorer: (1974)
- FIBA European Selection: (1975)
- 2× Mister Europa European Player of the Year: (1980, 1983)
- Euroscar European Player of the Year: (1983)
- Gigantes del Basket's Best European Player of All-Time: (1991)
- FIBA's 50 Greatest Players: (1991)
- Italian Basketball Hall of Fame: (2006)
- 50 Greatest EuroLeague Contributors: (2008)
- FIBA Hall of Fame: (2010)
- Walk of Fame of Italian sport (2015)
- Number 11 jersey retired by retired by Olimpia Milano: (2019)
