= 2011 Copa del Rey de Baloncesto =

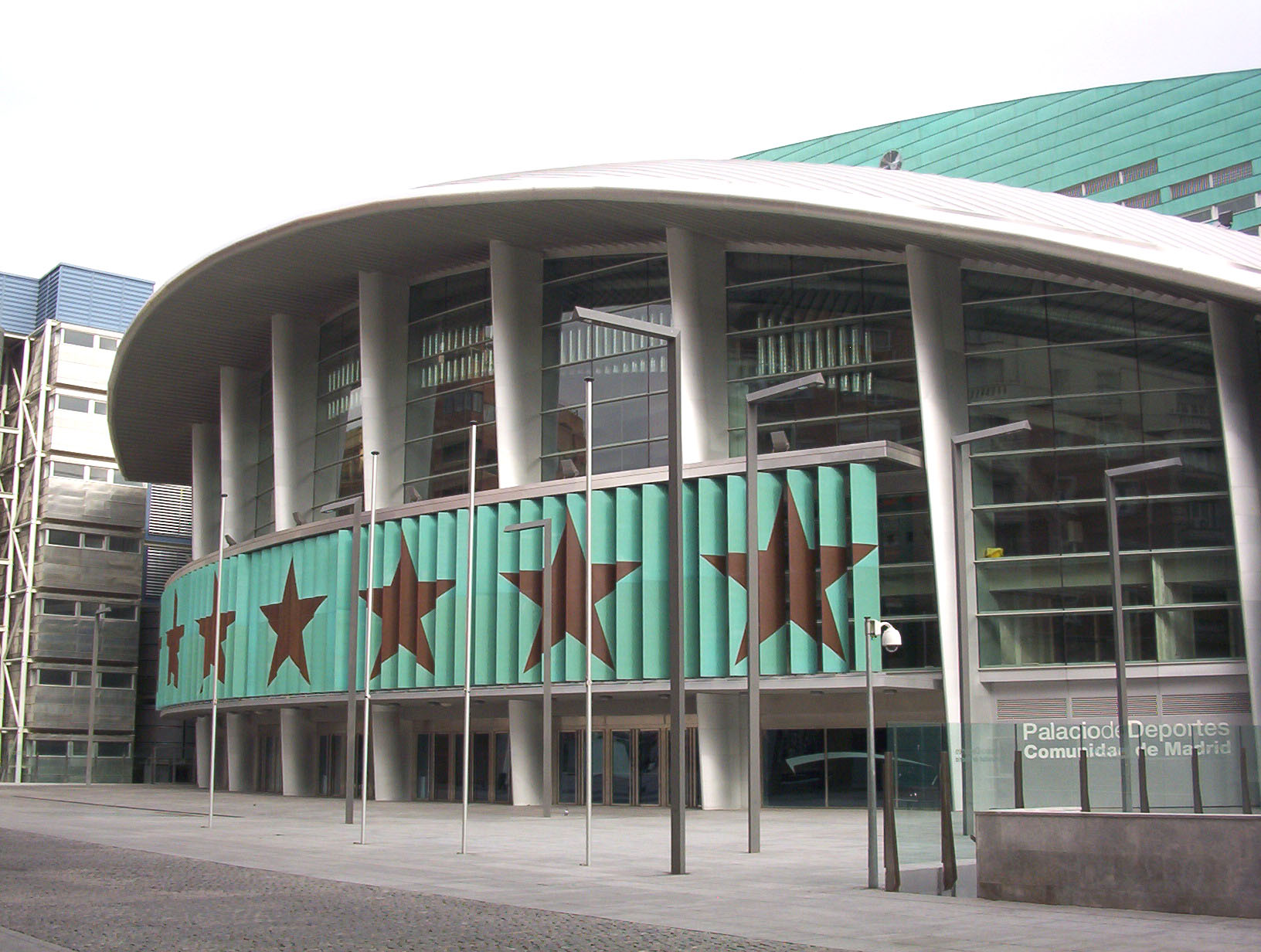
Palacio de Deportes de la Comunidad de Madrid (Madrid, Spain, built: 2002–2005). Indoor sports building

The Copa del Rey 2010-11 was the 75th edition of the Spanish basketball Cup. It was managed by the ACB and was played in Madrid, in the Palacio de los Deportes on February 10–13 2011.

== Bracket ==
Quarterfinals; February 10 & 11		Semifinals; February 12		Final; February 13
B de R Valladolid	60
PE Valencia	83	PE Valencia	59
Real Madrid	78	Real Madrid	69
Gran Canaria 2014	72			Real Madrid	60
Bilbao Bizkaia Basket	74			Regal FC Barcelona	68
Caja Laboral	76	Caja Laboral	73
Regal FC Barcelona	86	Regal FC Barcelona	92
DKV Joventut	66

By the score of 60–68, FC Barcelona Bàsquet defeated Real Madrid Baloncesto and defended its 2010 title. Alan Anderson was named MVP of the tournament.

=== Quarterfinals ===
FORTA & Teledeporte (Spain)

February 10
19:00 GTM+1

Report

Blancos de Rueda Valladolid (Castile and León)	60–83	(Valencian Community) Power Electronics Valencia
Scoring by quarter: 16-19, 14-25, 14-18, 16-21
Pts: García 15; Rebs: Báez 8 Asts: Dumas 2		Pts: Claver 19; Rebs: Claver 9 Asts: Cook 6

Palacio de los Deportes, Madrid
Attendance: 9,550
Referees: Hierrezuelo, Conde, Cortés

Teledeporte (Spain)

February 10
21:30 GTM+1

Report

Real Madrid (Community of Madrid)	78–72	(Canary Islands) Gran Canaria 2014
Scoring by quarter: 14-21, 25-13, 17-17, 22-21
Pts: Rodríguez 17; Rebs: Suárez 7 Asts: Rodríguez, Suárez 3		Pts: Carroll 30; Rebs: Rey 9 Asts: three players 3

Palacio de los Deportes, Madrid
Attendance: 12,500
Referees: De la Maza, Pérez Pérez, Peruga

FORTA & Teledeporte (Spain)

February 11
19:00 GTM+1

Report

Bizkaia Bilbao Basket (Basque Country (autonomous community))	74–76	(Basque Country (autonomous community)) Caja Laboral
Scoring by quarter: 24 - 20, 19 - 16, 15 - 15, 18 -23
Pts: Huertas 18; Rebs: Batista 7 Asts: Huertas 10		Pts: Vasileiadis 31; Rebs: Mavroeidis 8 Asts: Jackson 4

Palacio de los Deportes, Madrid
Attendance: 12,850

Teledeporte (Spain)

February 11
21:30 GTM+1

Report

Regal FC Barcelona (Catalonia)	86–66	(Catalonia) DKV Joventut
Scoring by quarter: 24 - 18, 19 - 15, 15 - 19, 28 - 14
Pts: N'Dong 18; Rebs: Rubio, Morris 6 Asts: Lakovič 6		Pts: Hosley, McDonald 13; Rebs: Trias 8 Asts: Trias 6

Palacio de los Deportes, Madrid
Attendance: 12950

=== Semifinals ===
Teledeporte (Spain)

February 12
18:00 GTM+1

Report

Power Electronics Valencia (Valencian Community)	59–69	Real Madrid (Community of Madrid)
Scoring by quarter: 11-14, 16-21, 19- 13, 23-11
Pts: Martínez 19; Rebs: Claver 4 Asts: Martìnez, Cook 2		Pts: Suárez 16; Rebs: Mirotić 4 Asts: Rodríguez 5

Palacio de los Deportes, Madrid
Attendance: 13045
Referees: J.A. Martín Bertrán, J.R. García Ortiz, Vicente Bultó

FORTA & Teledeporte (Spain)

February 12
20:30 GTM+1

Report

Caja Laboral (Basque Country (autonomous community))	73–92	(Catalonia) Regal FC Barcelona
Scoring by quarter: 11-21, 25-18, 13-23, 24-30
Pts: Logan, Barać 15; Rebs: Barac 8 Asts: Huertas 10		Pts: Navarro 26; Rebs: Perović 8 Asts: Rubio, Navarro 3

Palacio de los Deportes, Madrid
Attendance: 13045
Referees: Daniel Hierrezuelo, Redondo, Antonio Conde

=== Final ===
FORTA & Teledeporte (Spain)

February 13
18:00 GTM+1

Report

Real Madrid (Community of Madrid)	60–68	(Catalonia) Regal FC Barcelona
Scoring by quarter: 17-19, 13-11, 13-18, 17-20
Pts: Tomić 12; Rebs: Suárez 9 Asts: Tomić 3		Pts: Anderson 19; Rebs: N'Dong 9 Asts: Sada 6

Palacio de los Deportes, Madrid
Attendance: 13045

Copa del Rey 2011 Champions

Regal Barcelona
22nd title
