= Euroscar =

Annual basketball award

- Sport: Basketball

History
- First award: 1979
- Editions: 36
- First winner: (Soviet Union) Vladimir Tkachenko
- Most wins: (Germany) Dirk Nowitzki (Lithuania) Arvydas Sabonis (6 awards)
- Most recent: (Slovenia) Luka Dončić (1st award)

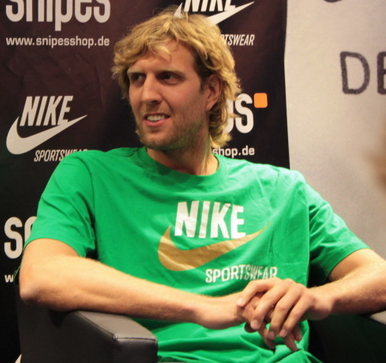
German-born power forward Dirk Nowitzki has won six Euroscar Awards.

The Euroscar European Player of the Year Award is an annual basketball award given to the year's best male European basketball player. Its name is a portmanteau of Europe and Oscar, and the award is often referred to as "European basketball’s Oscar”.

Any player with European citizenship is eligible for the award, regardless of his current club. The award is judged on the basis of both sports club and national team performances and accomplishments. The honor is presented the January after the calendar year it is awarded for, i.e. the 2011 award was presented in 2012. It was first given out in 1979 to Soviet center Vladimir Tkachenko, and has since then been routinely given to players who fared well in international competitions such as the EuroBasket, FIBA World Cup or Olympic Games. As of 2020, the most recent winner is Slovenian player Luka Dončić. Lithuanian center Arvydas Sabonis and German power forward Dirk Nowitzki hold the record for most wins with six each.

The Euroscar is decided upon by a committee composed of general managers, coaches, players, sportswriters from 33 countries. The award is presented by the Italian newspaper La Gazzetta dello Sport. It is one of the two main player of the year awards that any European basketball player can currently receive, along with Eurobasket.com's All-Europe Player of the Year. Previously, there was also the official FIBA Europe Men's Player of the Year Award (2005–2014), and Italian magazine's Superbasket Mr. Europa Award (1976–2010).

== History and distinctions ==
The Euroscar was first awarded in 1979, and 21 of the first 23 winners were born in the Soviet Union or Yugoslavia. Thereafter, Dirk Nowitzki of Germany and Pau Gasol of Spain won eleven times between them, and as of 2022 an Eastern European has won the award only four times in the past twenty years.

Lithuanian center Arvydas Sabonis won six Euroscar Awards between 1984 and 1999.

The early winners of the Euroscar played primarily for EuroLeague clubs. Since Dražen Petrović won his third award in 1992, while playing for the New Jersey Nets, only four Euroscar winners (Sabonis in 1995, Gregor Fučka in 2000, Kirilenko in 2012, and Teodosić in 2016) played in a European league during the year they won the award, and only Fučka and Teodosić did not play in the NBA for any part of their award-winning years.

As of 2015, three players have won five or more Euroscars: Sabonis (six), Nowitzki (six), and Toni Kukoč (five). Nowitzki holds the record for most consecutive wins with five. Seven Euroscar winners have been inducted into the FIBA Hall of Fame: Tkachenko, Sabonis, Petrović, Dražen Dalipagić, Dino Meneghin, Dragan Kićanović and Nikos Galis. Sabonis, Petrović, Dalipagić, Galis and Meneghin are also in the Naismith Memorial Basketball Hall of Fame. One pair of brothers have each won the award: the Spaniards Pau and Marc Gasol. As of the 2019–20 basketball season, the Gasols, Antetokounmpo, Goran Dragić and Dončić are the only award winners still active in the NBA. As of 2020, Nowitzki and Antetokounmpo are also the only players to win the Euroscar Award and the NBA Most Valuable Player Award, albeit in different seasons. Kukoč (1996, 1998), Nowitzki (2011), Parker (2007) and Pau Gasol (2009–10) all won NBA titles in their Euroscar-winning years; Kukoč and Gasol are the only players to do so more than once. Dalipagić (1980) and Sabonis (1988) won Olympic gold medals and a Euroscar in the same year.

== Award winners ==
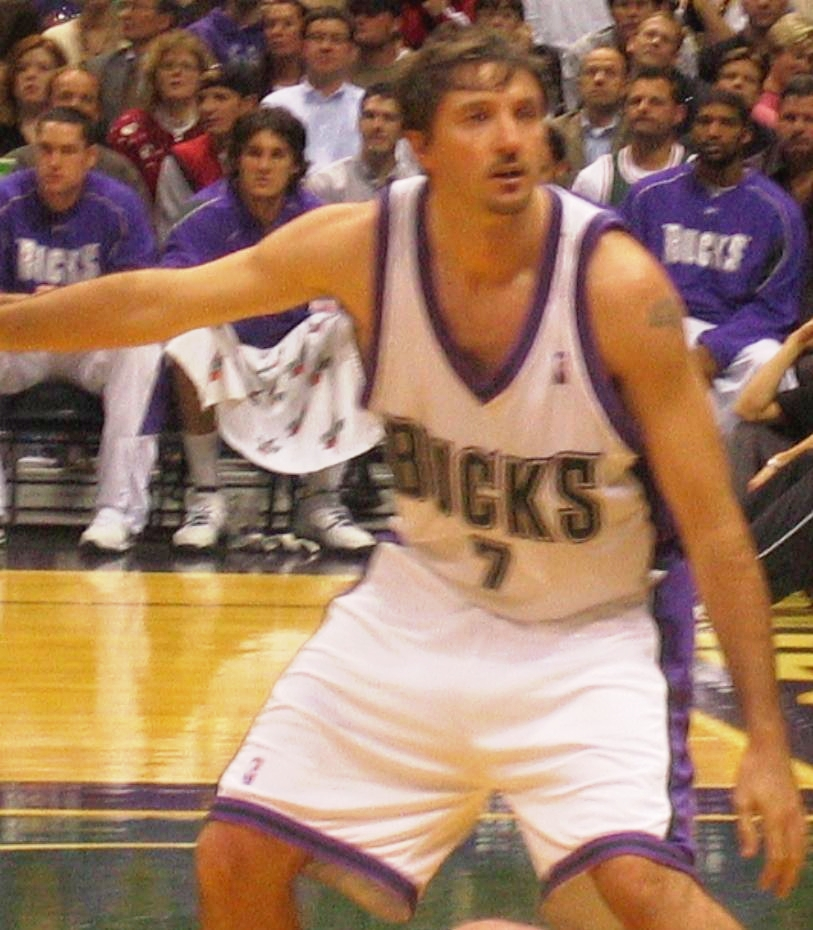
Croatian player Toni Kukoč won five Euroscar Awards between 1990 and 1998.

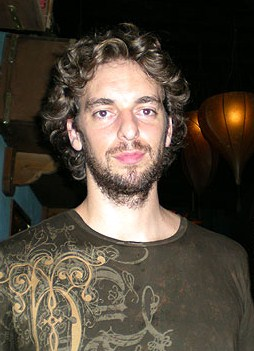
Spanish forward/center Pau Gasol won three straight awards between 2008 and 2010. His brother Marc won the award in 2014.

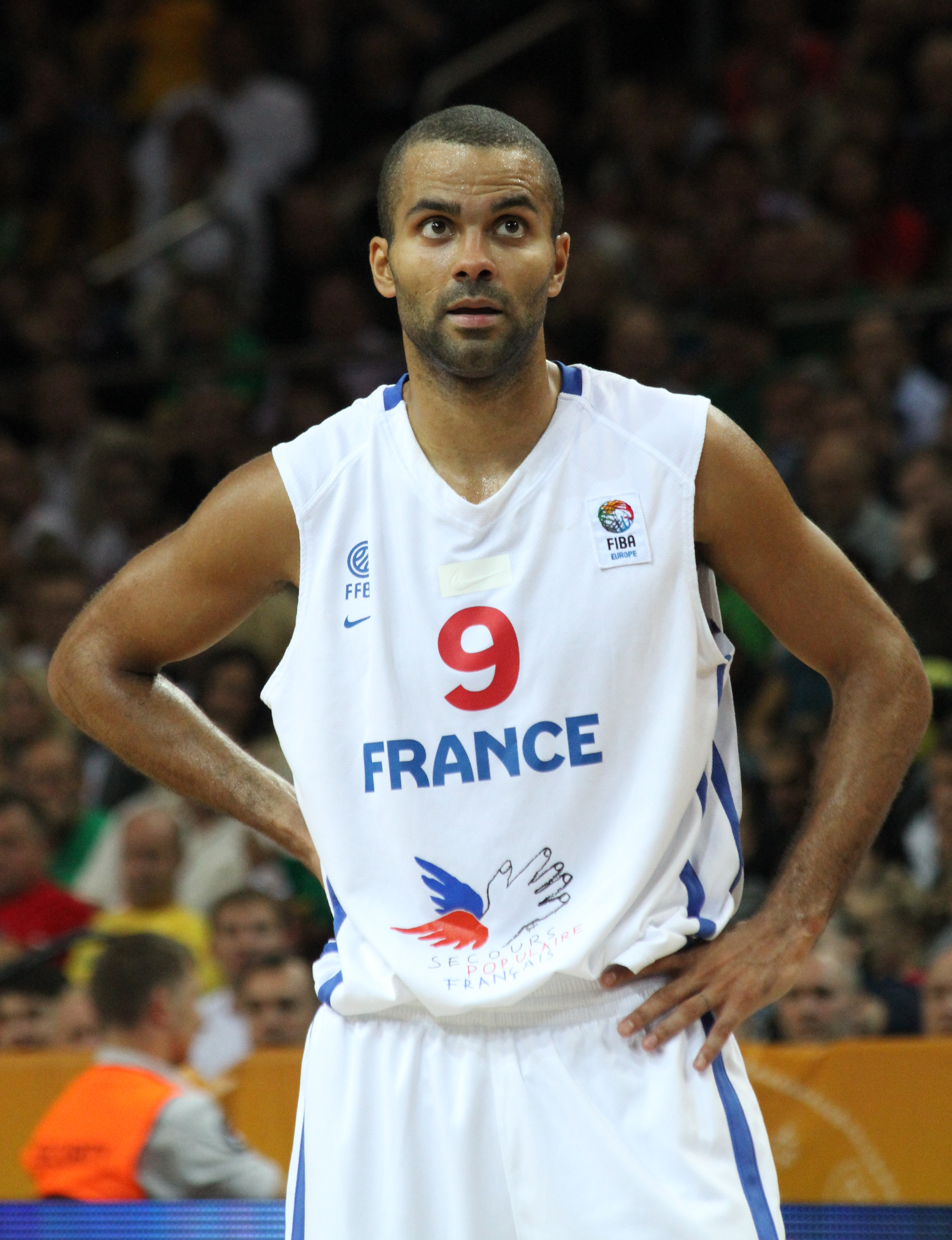
French point guard Tony Parker won the award in 2007 and 2013.

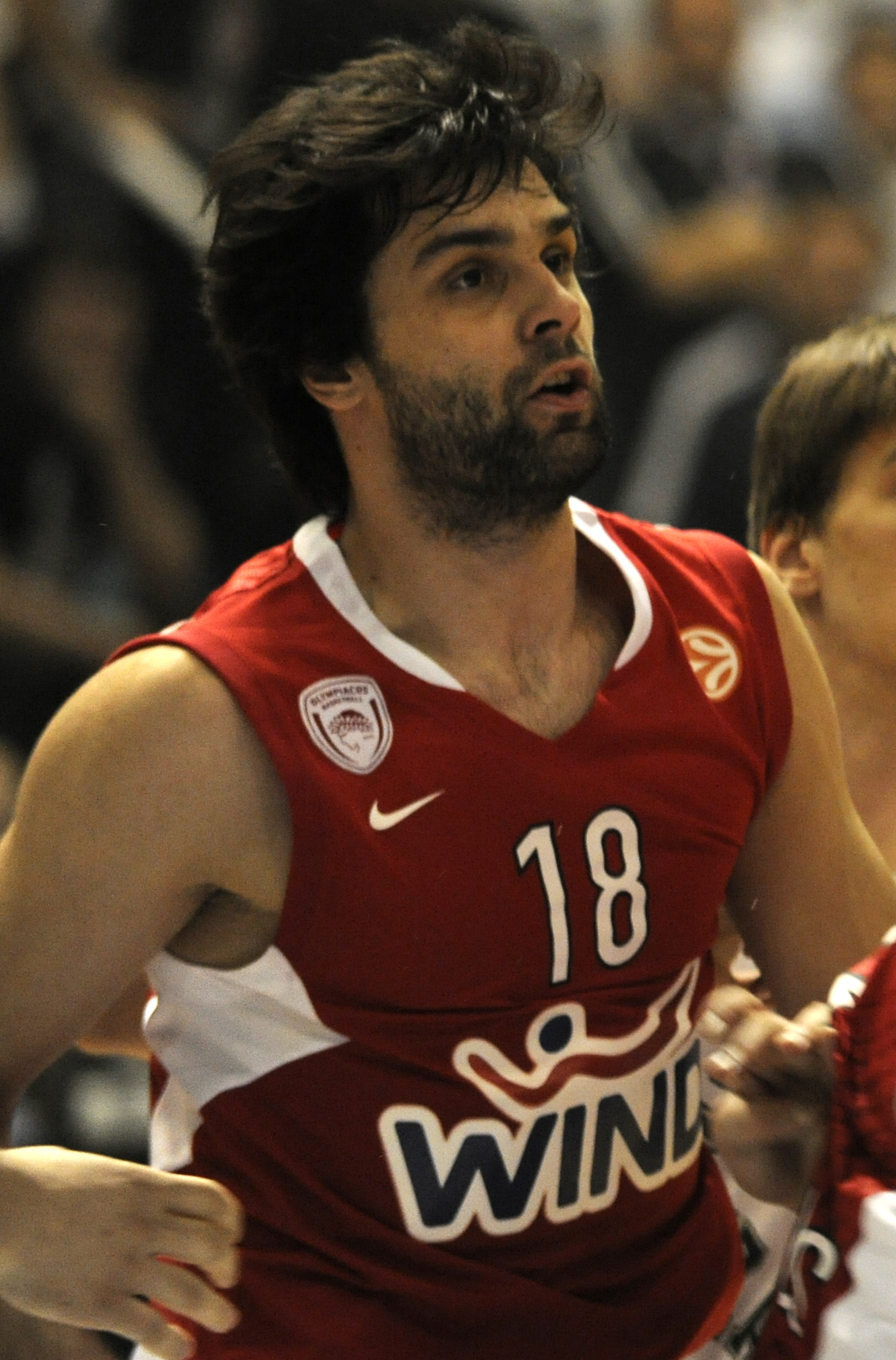
Serbian point guard Miloš Teodosić, 2016

When a winner has played for more than one club team in the calendar year of his award, all are listed.

^	Denotes player who is still active
*	Inducted into the Naismith Memorial Basketball Hall of Fame
**	Inducted into the FIBA Hall of Fame
***	Inducted into both the Naismith and FIBA Halls of Fame
Player (X)	Denotes the number of times the player won the Euroscar Award

Year	Winner	Country	Club(s)	Ref.
1979	Vladimir Tkachenko**	Soviet Union	Stroitel	
1980	Dražen Dalipagić***	Yugoslavia	Partizan	
1981	Dragan Kićanović**	Yugoslavia	Partizan and Scavolini Pesaro	
1982	Dragan Kićanović** (2)	Yugoslavia	Scavolini Pesaro	
1983	Dino Meneghin***	Italy	Billy / Simac Milano	
1984	Arvydas Sabonis***	Soviet Union	Žalgiris	
1985	Arvydas Sabonis*** (2)	Soviet Union	Žalgiris	
1986	Dražen Petrović***	Yugoslavia	Cibona	
1987	Nikos Galis***	Greece	Aris	
1988	Arvydas Sabonis*** (3)	Soviet Union	Žalgiris	
1989	Dražen Petrović*** (2)	Yugoslavia	Real Madrid and Portland Trail Blazers	
1990	Toni Kukoč**	Yugoslavia	Jugoplastika / POP 84	
1991	Toni Kukoč** (2)	Yugoslavia; Croatia	POP 84 and Benetton Treviso	
1992	Dražen Petrović*** (3)	Croatia	New Jersey Nets	
1993	Dražen Petrović*** (4)	Croatia	New Jersey Nets	
1994	Toni Kukoč** (3)	Croatia	Chicago Bulls	
1995	Arvydas Sabonis*** (4)	Lithuania	Real Madrid Teka and Portland Trail Blazers	
1996	Toni Kukoč** (4)	Croatia	Chicago Bulls	
1997	Arvydas Sabonis*** (5)	Lithuania	Portland Trail Blazers	
1998	Toni Kukoč** (5)	Croatia	Chicago Bulls	
1999	Arvydas Sabonis*** (6)	Lithuania	Portland Trail Blazers	
2000	Gregor Fučka	Italy	Paf Wennington Bologna	
2001	Peja Stojaković**	Yugoslavia	Sacramento Kings	
2002	Dirk Nowitzki*	Germany	Dallas Mavericks	
2003	Dirk Nowitzki* (2)	Germany	Dallas Mavericks	
2004	Dirk Nowitzki* (3)	Germany	Dallas Mavericks	
2005	Dirk Nowitzki* (4)	Germany	Dallas Mavericks	
2006	Dirk Nowitzki* (5)	Germany	Dallas Mavericks	
2007	Tony Parker*	France	San Antonio Spurs	
2008	Pau Gasol*	Spain	Memphis Grizzlies and Los Angeles Lakers	
2009	Pau Gasol* (2)	Spain	Los Angeles Lakers	
2010	Pau Gasol* (3)	Spain	Los Angeles Lakers	
2011	Dirk Nowitzki* (6)	Germany	Dallas Mavericks	
2012	Andrei Kirilenko	Russia	CSKA Moscow and Minnesota Timberwolves	
2013	Tony Parker* (2)	France	San Antonio Spurs	
2014	Marc Gasol	Spain	Memphis Grizzlies	
2015	Pau Gasol* (4)	Spain	Chicago Bulls	
2016	Miloš Teodosić	Serbia	CSKA Moscow	
2017	Goran Dragić	Slovenia	Miami Heat	
2018	Giannis Antetokounmpo^	Greece	Milwaukee Bucks	
2019	Luka Dončić^	Slovenia	Dallas Mavericks	
