= Mr. Europa =

European Basketball Award

- Sport: Basketball

History
- First award: 1976
- Editions: 35
- First winner: (Italy) Pierluigi Marzorati
- Most wins: (Croatia) Toni Kukoč (4)
- Most recent: (Spain) Juan Carlos Navarro (2010)

Arvydas Sabonis won the Mr. Europa award 2 times (1985, 1997).

The Mister Europa European Player of the Year Award was an annual basketball award created in 1976, and given until 2010, by the panel of journalists of the Italian weekly magazine Superbasket. Its purpose was to praise the best basketball player with European citizenship for a given season, regardless of where he played in the world, including the NBA. The award was judged on the basis of both sports club and national team performances and accomplishments.

Like the Italian newspaper's La Gazzetta dello Sport Euroscar Award, and Eurobasket.com's All-Europe Player of the Year, it was not the official FIBA Europe Men's Player of the Year Award, which is given out by FIBA. Its legitimacy, however, stemmed from the fact that it was the oldest of all four awards, as it was created three years before the Euroscar, twenty-six years before the All-Europe Player of the Year, and twenty-nine years before the official FIBA award. Croatian small forward Toni Kukoč, holds the record for most wins with four, three of them being consecutive, a record as well.

== Honor roll ==
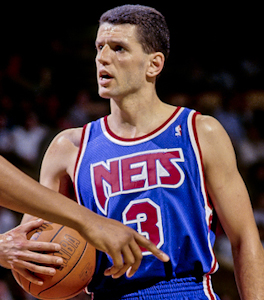
Dražen Petrović won the Mr. Europa award 2 times (1986, 1993).

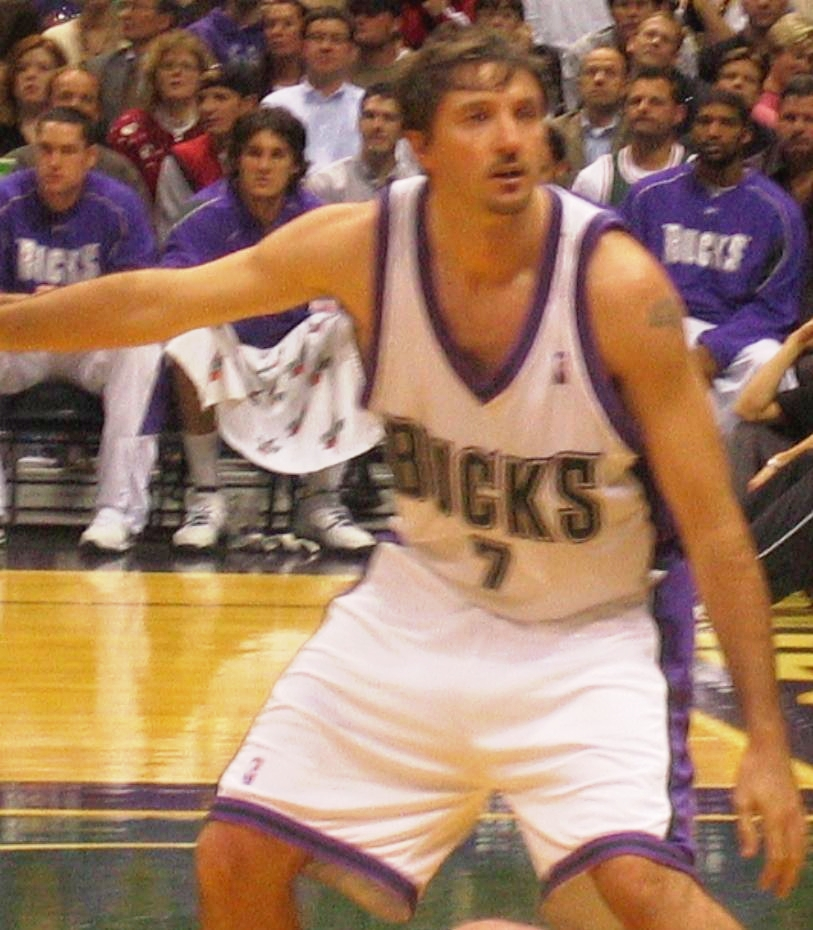
Toni Kukoč won the Mr. Europa award 4 times (1990, 1991, 1992, 1996).

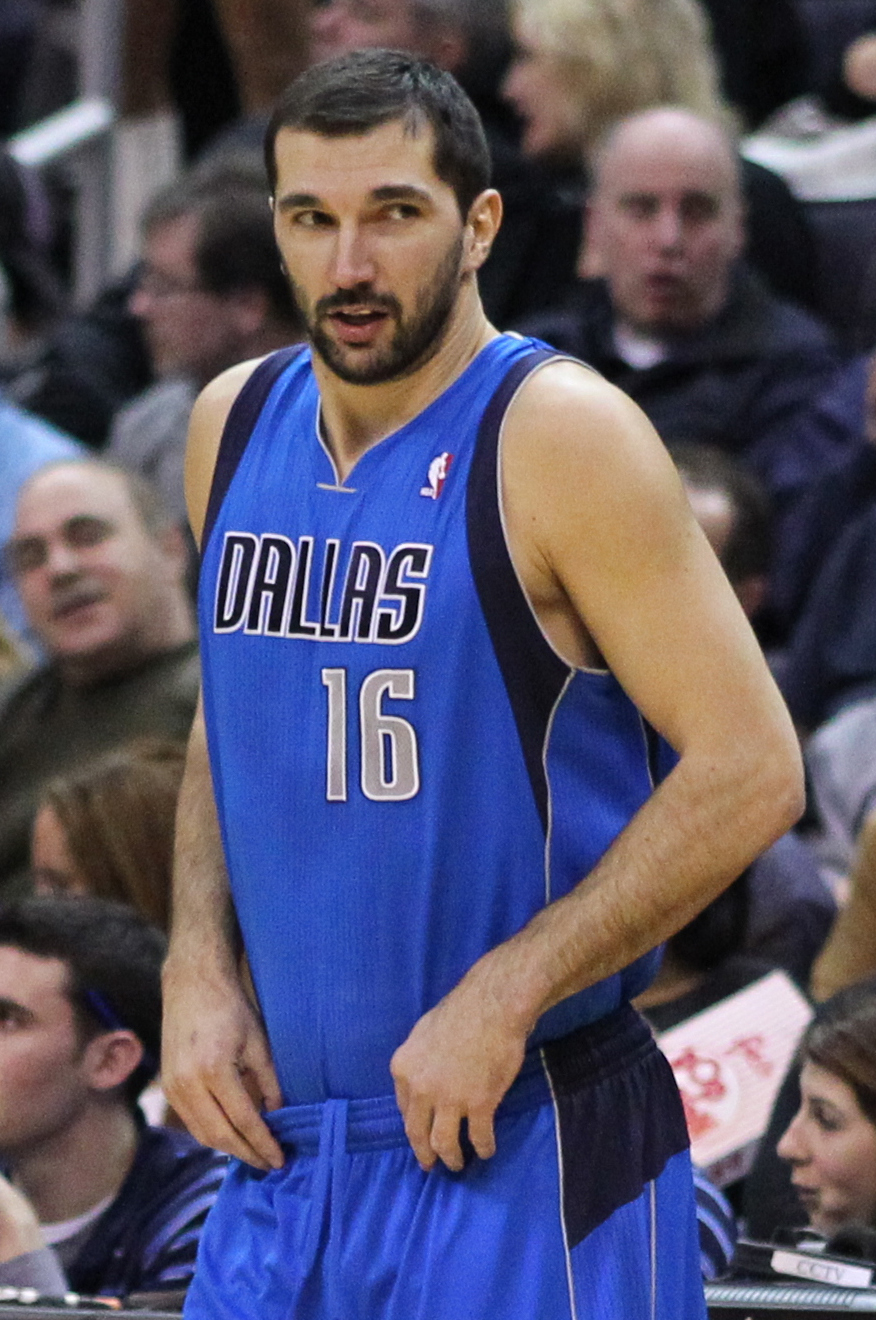
Peja Stojaković won the Mr. Europa award 2 times (2001, 2002).

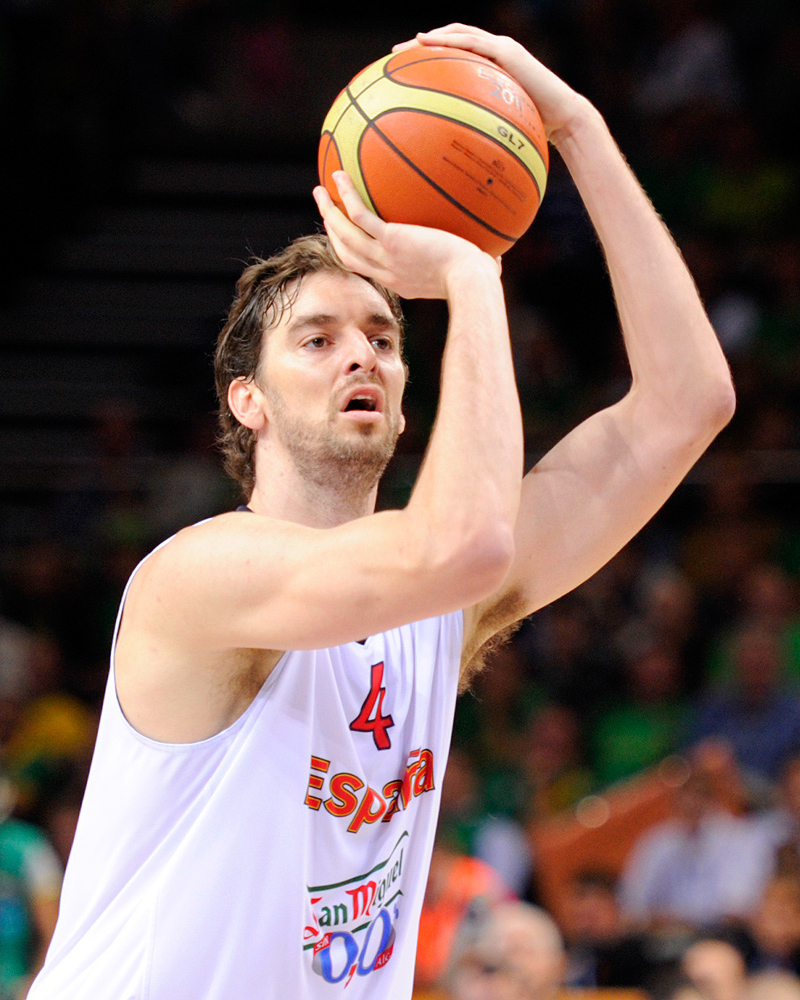
Pau Gasol won the Mr. Europa award 2 times (2004, 2009).

When a player was with more than one club in the calendar year of his award, all are listed.

Two players are listed as citizens of more than one country:

- Toni Kukoč is listed for 1991 as a citizen of both Yugoslavia and Croatia because Croatia declared its independence in that year.
- Peja Stojaković is listed as a citizen of both FR Yugoslavia and Serbia and Montenegro in 2002, the year of establishment of the latter entity. He also holds Greek citizenship.

*	Member of the Naismith Memorial Basketball Hall of Fame
**	Member of the FIBA Hall of Fame
***	Member of both the Naismith and FIBA Halls of Fame

Year	Winner	Club(s)
1976	(Italy) Pierlo Marzorati**	(Italy) Birra Forst Cantù
1977	(Socialist Federal Republic of Yugoslavia) Dražen Dalipagić***	(Socialist Federal Republic of Yugoslavia) Partizan
1978	(Socialist Federal Republic of Yugoslavia) Dražen Dalipagić*** (2)	(Socialist Federal Republic of Yugoslavia) Partizan
1979	(Soviet Union) Vladimir Tkachenko	(Soviet Union) Stroitel
1980	(Italy) Dino Meneghin***	(Italy) Emerson Varese & (Italy) Billy Milano
1981	(Socialist Federal Republic of Yugoslavia) Dragan Kićanović**	(Socialist Federal Republic of Yugoslavia) Partizan & (Italy) Scavolini Pesaro
1982	(Socialist Federal Republic of Yugoslavia) Dragan Kićanović** (2)	(Italy) Scavolini Pesaro
1983	(Italy) Dino Meneghin*** (2)	(Italy) Billy / Simac Milano
1984	(Spain) Juan Antonio San Epifanio "Epi"	(Spain) FC Barcelona
1985	(Soviet Union) Arvydas Sabonis***	(Soviet Union) Žalgiris
1986	(Socialist Federal Republic of Yugoslavia) Dražen Petrović***	(Socialist Federal Republic of Yugoslavia) Cibona
1987	(Greece) Nikos Galis***	(Greece) Aris
1988	(Soviet Union) Šarūnas Marčiulionis***	(Soviet Union) Statyba
1989	(Socialist Federal Republic of Yugoslavia) Vlade Divac***	(Socialist Federal Republic of Yugoslavia) Partizan & (United States) Los Angeles Lakers
1990	(Socialist Federal Republic of Yugoslavia) Toni Kukoč***	(Socialist Federal Republic of Yugoslavia) Jugoplastika / POP 84
1991	(Socialist Federal Republic of Yugoslavia) (Croatia) Toni Kukoč*** (2)	(Socialist Federal Republic of Yugoslavia) POP 84 & (Italy) Benetton Treviso
1992	(Croatia) Toni Kukoč*** (3)	(Italy) Benetton Treviso
1993	(Croatia) Dražen Petrović*** (2)	(United States) New Jersey Nets
1994	(Federal Republic of Yugoslavia) Aleksandar "Saša" Đorđević	(Italy) Recoaro Milano & (Italy) Filodoro Bologna
1995	(Federal Republic of Yugoslavia) Aleksandar "Saša" Đorđević (2)	(Italy) Filodoro / Teamsystem Bologna
1996	(Croatia) Toni Kukoč*** (4)	(United States) Chicago Bulls
1997	(Lithuania) Arvydas Sabonis*** (2)	(United States) Portland Trail Blazers
1998	(Federal Republic of Yugoslavia) Predrag "Saša" Danilović	(Italy) Kinder Bologna
1999	(Italy) Andrea Meneghin	(Italy) Varese Roosters
2000	(Italy) Gregor Fučka	(Italy) Paf Wennington Bologna
2001	(Federal Republic of Yugoslavia) Peja Stojaković	(United States) Sacramento Kings
2002	(Federal Republic of Yugoslavia) Peja Stojaković (2)	(United States) Sacramento Kings
2003	(Lithuania) Šarūnas Jasikevičius	(Spain) FC Barcelona & (Israel) Maccabi Elite Tel Aviv
2004	(Spain) Pau Gasol*	(United States) Memphis Grizzlies
2005	(Germany) Dirk Nowitzki*	(United States) Dallas Mavericks
2006	(Spain) Jorge Garbajosa	(Spain) Unicaja & (Canada) Toronto Raptors
2007	(Greece) Dimitris Diamantidis	(Greece) Panathinaikos
2008	(Spain) Ricky Rubio	(Spain) DKV Joventut
2009	(Spain) Pau Gasol* (2)	(United States) Los Angeles Lakers
2010	(Spain) Juan Carlos Navarro	(Spain) Regal FC Barcelona

== See also ==
- Euroscar
- FIBA Europe Men's Player of the Year Award
- FIBA Europe Young Men's Player of the Year Award
- EuroLeague MVP
- EuroLeague Final Four MVP
