= Superbasket Magazine =

Italian basketball magazine

Superbasket Magazine is an Italian magazine dedicated to the coverage of European and world basketball. It was first published in 1979, being one of the oldest basketball publications in Europe.

== History and profile ==
Superbasket Magazine was founded by Aldo Giordani in 1979. Every year of its existence until 2010, a panel of its journalists delivered the Mister Europa Player of the Year Award, which was based on European players' performances with their sport clubs and national teams.

The magazine was headquartered in Milan until 1992 when it was moved to Bologna.

Due to financial issues, it had to shut down its publication from February 2012 to March 2014, when a monthly online version was introduced.
