= Pilar (given name) =

Pilar is a feminine Spanish language given name, traditionally short for "Maria del Pilar". Notable people with the name include:

== Female ==
- Pilar Adón (born 1971), Spanish writer and translator
- Pilar Alcaide, Spanish-born cardiac biologist and immunologist
- Pilar Arlando (born 1989), Portuguese holder of the title of Miss World Singapore for 2009–2010
- Pilar Barbosa (1898–1997), Puerto Rican educator, historian and political activist
- Pilar Bardem (1939–2021), Spanish film and television actress
- Pilar Barreiro (born 1955), Spanish politician
- Pilar Bayer (born 1946), Spanish mathematician
- Pilar Caballero Alvarez (born 1993), German politician
- Pilar Cabot (1940–2017), Catalan writer
- Pilar Calveiro (born 1953), Argentine political scientist
- Pilar Calvo (born 1963), Catalan politician
- Pilar Calvo Rodero (1910-1974), sculptor, costume designer, set designer
- Pilar Campoy (born 1990), Argentine field hockey player
- Pilar Cattaneo (born 2007), Argentine gymnast
- Pilar Cisneros (born 1954), Peruvian-Costa Rican journalist and politician
- Pilar De Biase (born 1996), Argentine field hockey player
- Pilar de Borbón (1936–2020), Infanta Pilar of Spain, Duchess of Badajoz
- Pilar del Castillo (born 1952), Spanish Member of the European Parliament
- Pilar de Lusarreta (1914–1967), Argentine author and critic
- Pilar Espuña i Domènech (1928–2010), Catalan labor and feminist activist
- Pilar Fuertes Ferragut (1962–2012), Spanish diplomat
- Pilar Geijo (born 1984), Argentine Marathon swimmer
- Pilar González i Duarte (born 1945), Spanish chemist
- Pilar Hidalgo (born 1979), Spanish female athlete
- Pilar Hidalgo-Lim (1893–1973), Filipino educator and civic leader
- Pilar Homem de Melo (born 1963), Portuguese singer-songwriter
- Pilar Khoury (born 1995), Lebanese footballer
- Pilar López de Ayala (born 1978), Spanish film actress
- Pilar López Júlvez (1912–2008), Spanish choreographer and ballerina
- Pilar Lorengar (1928–1996), Spanish soprano
- Pilar Manjón (born 1958), president of the association for the victims of 11-M (11 March 2004 Madrid train bombings)
- Pilar Mateos (born 1942), Spanish writer of children's literature
- Pilar Mazzetti (born 1946), Peruvian doctor who currently holds the title of Minister of the Interior
- Pilar Medina (born c. 1956), first Spanish delegate to win the Miss International title in 1977
- Pilar Miró (1940–1997), Spanish screenwriter and film director
- Pilar Montenegro (born 1969), Mexican Latin pop singer and actress
- Pilar Morlón de Menéndez, Cuban suffragist
- Pilar Muñoz (1911–1980), Spanish actress of stage and film
- Pilar Muñoz, Spanish singer, member of the band Las Ketchup
- Pilar Nores de García (born 1949), Argentine economist
- Pilar Nouvilas i Garrigolas (1854-1938), Spanish painter
- Pilar Pallete (born 1936), Peruvian actress and third wife of the American film star John Wayne
- Pilar Paz Pasamar (1932–2019), Spanish poet and writer
- Pilar Pellicer (1938–2020), Mexican film actress
- Pilar Prades (1928-1959), last Spanish woman to be executed by garrote
- Pilar Rahola (born 1958), Spanish journalist, writer and former politician and MP
- Pilar Ramírez (1964–2017), Mexican synchronized swimmer
- Pilar Revuelta, Spanish film set decorator and art director
- Pilar Rioja (born 1932), Mexican dancer
- Pilar Roldán (born 1939), Mexican fencer
- Pilar Romang (born 1992), Argentine field hockey player
- Pilar Romero (born 1982), Argentine handball player
- Pilar Rubio (born 1978), Spanish reporter and TV presenter
- Pilar Ruiz-Lapuente (born 1964), Spanish astrophysicist working as a professor in University of Barcelona
- Pilar Seurat (1938–2001), Filipina-American film and television actress
- Pilar Vallugera (born 1967), Catalan politician
- Pilar Zabala Aguirre (born 1951), Spanish researcher, writer, and professor
- Pilar Zeta (born 1986), Argentine artist, graphic designer, and fashion designer

== Male ==
- Pilar Barrios (1889–1974), Uruguayan poet
- Pilar García (brigadier general) (born 1896), Cuban Chief of National Police in 1958 and 1959

== Fictional characters ==
- Pilar, from Ernest Hemingway's novel For Whom the Bell Tolls (also the name of his boat and nickname for his wife)
- Pilar (ピラル), a fictional character and techie in the original net animated (ONA) miniseries Cyberpunk: Edgerunners, based on the action role-playing game Cyberpunk 2077
- Pilar Estravados from Agatha Christie's "Hercule Poirot's Christmas"
- Pilar, from Paulo Coelho's novel By the River Piedra I Sat Down and Wept
- Pilar, from the musical Legally Blonde (musical)
- Pilar Cortez, from the ABC television series Last Resort
- Pilar Ortega, from the CBS nighttime soap opera Falcon Crest
- Pilar Lopez-Fitzgerald, from the NBC/DirecTV soap opera Passions
- Pilar Reed, from the SyFy television series Eureka
- Pilar Ternera, from the novel One Hundred Years of Solitude
- Pilar, a doll in the Groovy Girls line by Manhattan Toy
- Pilar Zuazo, from the Showtime dark comedy series Weeds
- Pilar, from Margaret Atwood's novel The Year of the Flood
- Pilar Dunoff, from Argentine soap opera Rebelde Way
- Pilar, from Emeric Pressburger's Killing a Mouse on Sunday
- Pilar, from the 2025 Spanish comedy television series soap opera Su majestad
