= Lapuente (surname) =

Lapuente is a Spanish surname. Notable people with the surname include:

- Fernando Lapuente (1928–1993), Argentine sprinter
- Manuel Lapuente (1944–2025), Mexican football player and manager

== See also ==
- Luis de la Puente (1554–1624), Spanish Jesuit theologian and ascetic writer
- Pilar Ruiz-Lapuente (born 1964), Spanish astrophysicist
- Sheila Herrero Lapuente (born 1976), Spanish inline speed skater
