= Nearby Supernova Factory =

Experiment

- Alternative names: SNfactory

The Nearby Supernova Factory (SNfactory) is a collaborative experiment led by Greg Aldering, designed to collect data on more Type Ia supernovae than have ever been studied in a single project before, and by studying them, to increase understanding of the expanding universe and dark energy.

The project began as an outgrowth of the Supernova Cosmology Project at Lawrence Berkeley National Laboratory, but while the SCP focused on supernovae with redshifts of approximately 1.2, corresponding to a distance of 8.7 billion light years, SNfactory searches for nearby supernovae with redshifts of 0.03 to 0.08, corresponding to a distance of only 400 million to 1.1 billion light years.

SNfactory uses a highly automated "pipeline" in which survey images from NASA's Near-Earth Asteroid Tracking project are processed by a supercomputing cluster to find promising candidates, which are then observed using the project's Supernova Integral Field Spectrograph (SNIFS) on the University of Hawaii 88-inch (2.2 m) telescope atop Mauna Kea in Hawaii.

Results from the project will also be used in refining the planned Supernova/Acceleration Probe.

== See also ==
- Supernova Cosmology Project
- Supernova/Acceleration Probe
