= Alcaide =

- Gender: Male
- Language: Portuguese; Spanish

Origin
- Meaning: "Castle Commander"
- Region of origin: Iberian Peninsula

Other names
- Variant form: Alcaid

Alcaide is a Portuguese and Spanish name, meaning 'castle commander'. It is borrowed from the Arabic term qāʾid, which literally means 'commander'.

== Etymology ==
From the Arabic 'commander' it becomes the Spanish form alcayde or alcaide, origin of the Portuguese form alcaide.

== Notable people ==
- Ana Alcaide (born 1976), Spanish musician
- Anselmo Pardo Alcaide (1913–1977), Spanish entomologist.
- Carmen Alcayde (born 1973), Spanish TV presenter and actress
- Chris Alcaide (1922–2004), American actor
- David Alcaide (born 1978), Spanish pool player
- Guillermo Alcaide (born 1986), Spanish tennis player
- Pepe Alcaide (born 1979), Spanish footballer
- Pilar Alcaide, Spanish-born cardiac biologist and immunologist
- Víctor Aguirre Alcaide (born 1972), Mexican politician
