= Pau Gasol =

Spanish basketball player (born 1980)

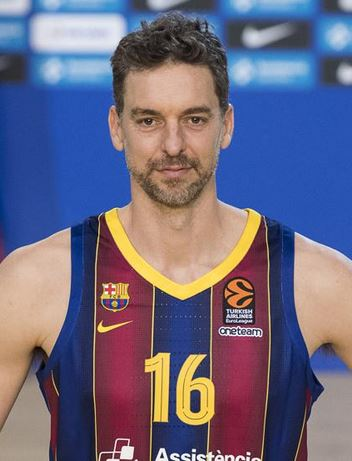
- Gasol with FC Barcelona in 2021

Bàsquet Girona
- Title: Vice-president
- League: Liga ACB

Personal information
- Born: July 6, 1980 (age 46) Barcelona, Catalonia, Spain
- Listed height: 7 ft 0 in (2.13 m) (Note: Gasol was listed at 7 feet 0 inches (2.13 m) until the 2019–20 NBA season, in which after the NBA standardized measurements and had the players' heights taken without shoes, Gasol was consequently listed at 7 feet 1 inch (2.16 m) as he was on the Portland Trail Blazers at that time. However, since he never played a single game after the 2018–19 season, official sources reverted his height back to 7 feet 0 inches (2.13 m) following his departure from the Trail Blazers.)
- Listed weight: 250 lb (113 kg)

Career information
- NBA draft: 2001: 1st round, 3rd overall pick
- Drafted by: Atlanta Hawks
- Playing career: 1998–2021
- Position: Power forward / center
- Number: 16, 17

Career history
- 1998–2001: FC Barcelona
- 2001–2008: Memphis Grizzlies
- 2008–2014: Los Angeles Lakers
- 2014–2016: Chicago Bulls
- 2016–2019: San Antonio Spurs
- 2019: Milwaukee Bucks
- 2021: FC Barcelona

Career highlights
- 2× NBA champion (2009, 2010); 6× NBA All-Star (2006, 2009–2011, 2015, 2016); 2× All-NBA Second Team (2011, 2015); 2× All-NBA Third Team (2009, 2010); NBA Rookie of the Year (2002); NBA All-Rookie First Team (2002); No. 16 retired by Los Angeles Lakers; All-EuroLeague Second Team (2001); 3× Liga ACB champion (1999, 2001, 2021); Spanish King's Cup winner (2001); Spanish King's Cup MVP (2001); ACB Finals MVP (2001); 2× FIBA Europe Player of the Year (2008, 2009); 2× Mister Europa Player of the Year (2004, 2009); 4× Euroscar Player of the Year (2008–2010, 2015); Spanish Sportsman of the Year (2011); FIBA World Cup MVP (2006); 2× FIBA EuroBasket MVP (2009, 2015); FIBA EuroBasket Dream Team (2020)

Career statistics
- Points: 20,894 (17.0 ppg)
- Rebounds: 11,305 (9.2 rpg)
- Assists: 3,925 (3.2 apg)
- Stats at NBA.com
- Stats at Basketball Reference
- Basketball Hall of Fame
- FIBA Hall of Fame
Medals
Men's basketball
Representing Spain
Summer Olympics
Silver medal – second place	2008 Beijing	Team
Silver medal – second place	2012 London	Team
Bronze medal – third place	2016 Rio de Janeiro	Team
World Cup
Gold medal – first place	2006 Japan	Team
EuroBasket
Gold medal – first place	2009 Poland	Team
Gold medal – first place	2011 Lithuania	Team
Gold medal – first place	2015 France–Croatia–Germany–Latvia	Team
Silver medal – second place	2003 Sweden	Team
Silver medal – second place	2007 Spain	Team
Bronze medal – third place	2001 Turkey	Team
Bronze medal – third place	2017 Finland–Israel–Romania–Turkey	Team

Pau Gasol Sáez (Note: Catalan: [ˈpaw ɣəˈzɔl] Spanish: [ˈpaw ɣaˈsol]) (born July 6, 1980) is a Spanish former professional basketball player who played in the National Basketball Association (NBA) for 18 seasons, primarily as a power forward. He was a six-time NBA All-Star and a four-time All-NBA team selection, twice on the second team and twice on the third team. Gasol won two NBA championships with the Los Angeles Lakers in 2009 and 2010. He was the NBA Rookie of the Year in 2002 with the Memphis Grizzlies, the first non-American to win that award. He is regarded as one of the greatest power forwards of all time and one of the greatest European players of all time. He is the older brother of former NBA player Marc Gasol.

Gasol was selected by the Atlanta Hawks with the third overall pick in the first round of the 2001 NBA draft, but his rights were traded to the Vancouver Grizzlies. He holds the Grizzlies' franchise record for free throws made and attempted. Following more than six seasons with Memphis, Gasol played for the Los Angeles Lakers (2008–2014), Chicago Bulls (2014–2016), San Antonio Spurs (2016–2019), and Milwaukee Bucks (2019).

Internationally, Gasol has won a FIBA World Cup title, three EuroBasket titles, two Olympic silver medals, and an Olympic bronze medal with the Spanish national basketball team. Gasol was named MVP of the 2006 FIBA World Cup and the 2009 and 2015 FIBA EuroBasket. Pau Gasol shares (with Krešimir Ćosić) the record for most EuroBasket MVP awards, with two each. Gasol is also the all-time leading scorer in the EuroBasket.

In 2021, he became a member of the International Olympic Committee (IOC). In 2023, it was announced that Gasol would be inducted into the Naismith Memorial Basketball Hall of Fame.

== Early life ==
Gasol was born in Barcelona. Both of his parents played basketball in organized leagues. His father Agustí, a nurse administrator, stood 6 feet 3 inches (1.91 m), and his mother Marisa, a medical doctor, was 6 feet 1 inch (1.85 m). When Gasol was born, his family was living in Cornellà, although he was born in Barcelona, at Sant Pau Hospital, where both of his parents worked. When he was 6 years old, his family moved to a city close to Barcelona, Sant Boi de Llobregat, where he spent the remainder of his childhood. Gasol was interested in football, but loved basketball. The first sport he played was actually rugby, before switching to basketball. He is described as "a family boy and the perfect student, a tad shy, and a bit of a joker."

He originally did not want to make sports his career. On the day that Magic Johnson announced his HIV-positive status in 1991, the 11-year-old Gasol, who had heard the news in school, decided that he wanted to be a doctor and find a cure for AIDS. He enrolled in medical school at the University of Barcelona in 1998, but left after one year as his basketball career at FC Barcelona advanced.

== Professional career ==
=== Barcelona (1998–2001) ===
Gasol began playing basketball as a center with his school team, Llor, and eventually signed with Cornellà. When he was sixteenile, he began playing for FC Barcelona's junior team. With Spain's national under-18 team, he won both the 1998 Albert Schweitzer Tournament and the 1998 FIBA Europe Under-18 Championship. Gasol made his debut on January 17, 1999, with the senior team of FC Barcelona and played just 25 total minutes in the Spanish ACB League's 1998–99 season, and averaged 13.7 minutes per game in the ACB the next year. However, in his final season in the ACB, Gasol averaged 12.4 points and 5.8 rebounds in 24.7 minutes per game. FC Barcelona was victorious in the Spanish National Cup's 2001 Final's championship game, and Gasol was named the Most Valuable Player of the tournament. After entering the NBA draft, Gasol was selected third overall in the first round of the 2001 NBA draft by the Atlanta Hawks, who traded his draft rights to the Vancouver Grizzlies in exchange for Shareef Abdur-Rahim and the Grizzlies' 27th pick in the draft Jamaal Tinsley.

=== Memphis Grizzlies (2001–2008) ===
==== 2001–2005: Rookie of the Year and first playoff appearances ====
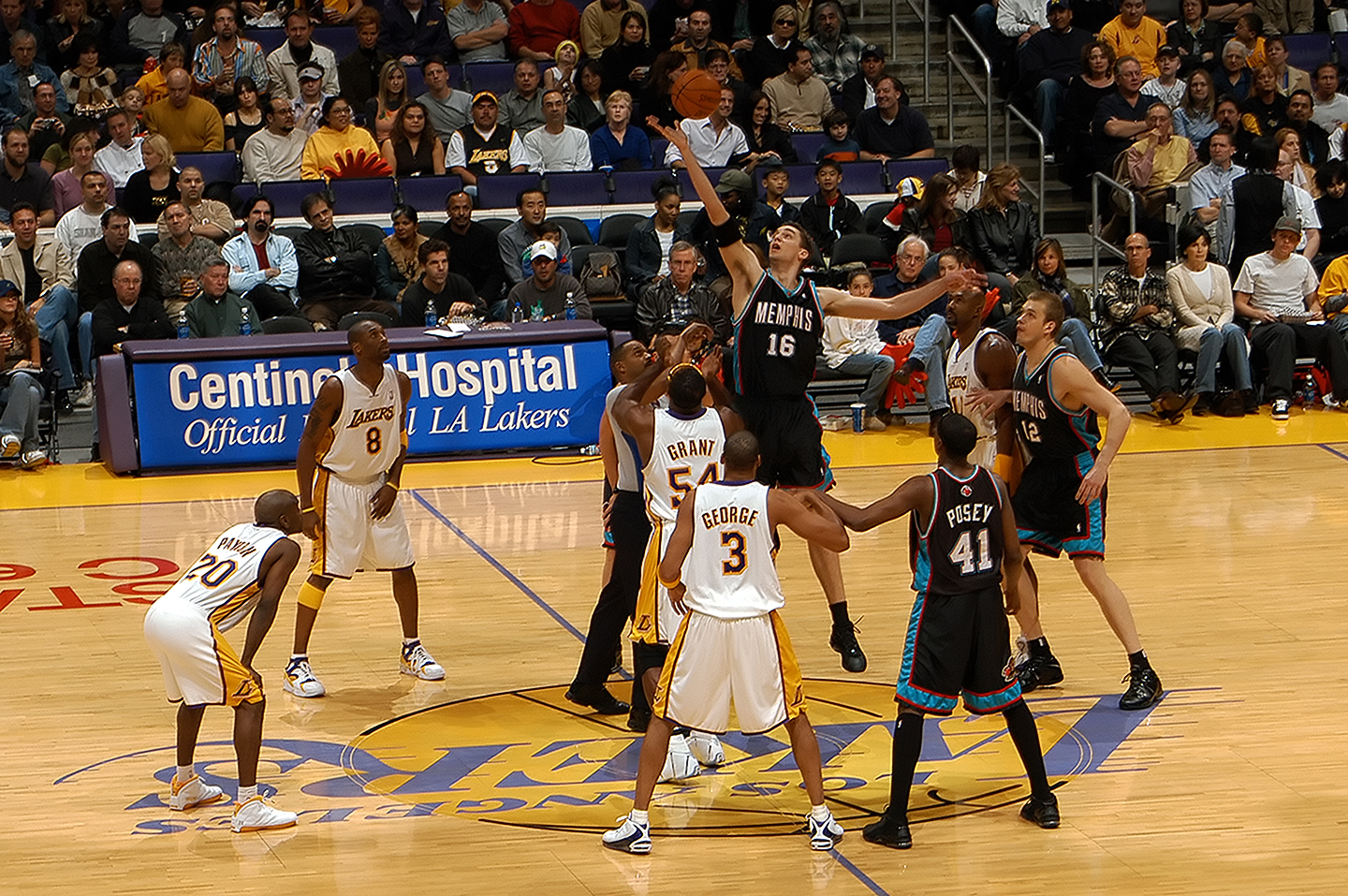
Gasol with the Memphis Grizzlies wins a jump ball during the opening tip against the Los Angeles Lakers in November 2003

In his first season with the Grizzlies, Gasol became the first foreign player to win the NBA Rookie of the Year Award, and was named to the NBA All-Rookie First Team. He averaged 17.6 points and 8.9 rebounds per game, and was also the only team member to play in all 82 games that season. Gasol led the team in scoring (19.0 points per game) in his second year with the Grizzlies, and for the second year in a row, played in all 82 games. Gasol missed the first game of his career, during his third year, with a foot injury on April 5, 2004, which snapped his string of 240 consecutive games played. He grabbed the 1,500th rebound of his career on November 12, 2003, against the Orlando Magic and scored his 3,000th career point on October 31, 2003, against the Boston Celtics. Despite having 22 points in Game 4 against the San Antonio Spurs, the highest by a Memphis players in the playoffs, his team was eliminated in the first round, not winning a single game against San Antonio. This was both the Grizzlies and Gasol's first trip to the NBA Playoffs. Following the season, Gasol signed a six-year, $86.5 million extension that began in the 2005–06 season and last through the 2011–12 season. On January 11, 2005, he scored 31 points and blocked four shots against the Indiana Pacers to earn 5,000 points and 500 blocks in his career, becoming the 10th fastest player to reach 5,000 points/500 blocks since 1973–74. He also helped his team make it to the playoffs for the second time in his career, but they were eliminated in the first round and did not win a single game against the Phoenix Suns.

==== 2005–2008: First All-Star appearance and franchise records ====
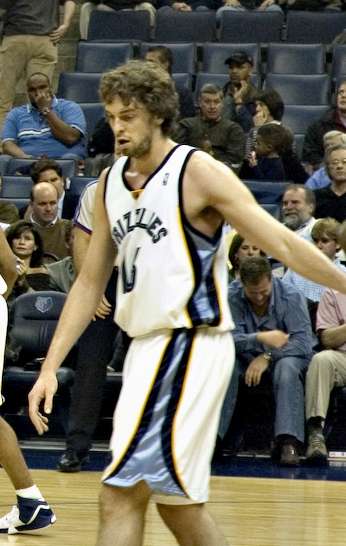
Gasol (pictured in 2007) with the Memphis Grizzlies

In his fifth year with the Grizzlies, he became the franchise's all-time leading rebounder on March 24 against the New York Knicks when he grabbed his 3,072nd rebound in a Grizzlies uniform. He made 29 consecutive free throw attempts from January 24 to 28, tying the second best mark in Grizzlies history, including two straight games going 12–12 from the line, tying the best single-game mark in franchise history. Gasol and the Grizzlies returned to the playoffs for the third time in his and his team's history. Once again, they were eliminated in the first round and did not win a single game against the Dallas Mavericks.

On February 9, 2006, making his first appearance, Gasol was selected to play in the 2006 NBA All-Star Game in Houston, Texas as a reserve center for the Western Conference. At the time, he was one of four players ranked among Western Conference forwards in the top ten in points, rebounds, assists and blocked shots. He was the first Spanish basketball player as well as the first Grizzlies player to ever make it to the All-Star Game.

Gasol missed the first 23 games of the 2006–07 NBA season due to a broken foot suffered near the end of Spain's semifinal win over Argentina in the 2006 FIBA World Championship. He would go on to be named Most Valuable Player of the tournament, which Spain won. He had a season-high 34 points (most by a Grizzly that season), and eight rebounds and tied a career-high and franchise record with eight blocks on January 29 against the Sacramento Kings, and surpassed Shareef Abdur-Rahim as the franchise's all-time leader in free throw attempts on January 31 against the Dallas Mavericks. He became the all-time franchise leader in field goals made on February 6 against the Houston Rockets, and became the all-time franchise leader in minutes played on February 7 at Dallas. He surpassed Shareef Abdur-Rahim (7,801 points) as the Grizzlies' all-time leading scorer on March 7, 2007, against the Toronto Raptors (7,809 points at the time). On January 24, 2007, Gasol recorded his second career triple-double against the hosting Utah Jazz, garnering 17 points, 13 rebounds, and 12 assists. He also registered 2 blocks and one steal.

=== Los Angeles Lakers (2008–2014) ===
==== 2008–2011: Back-to-back championships and All-NBA appearances ====
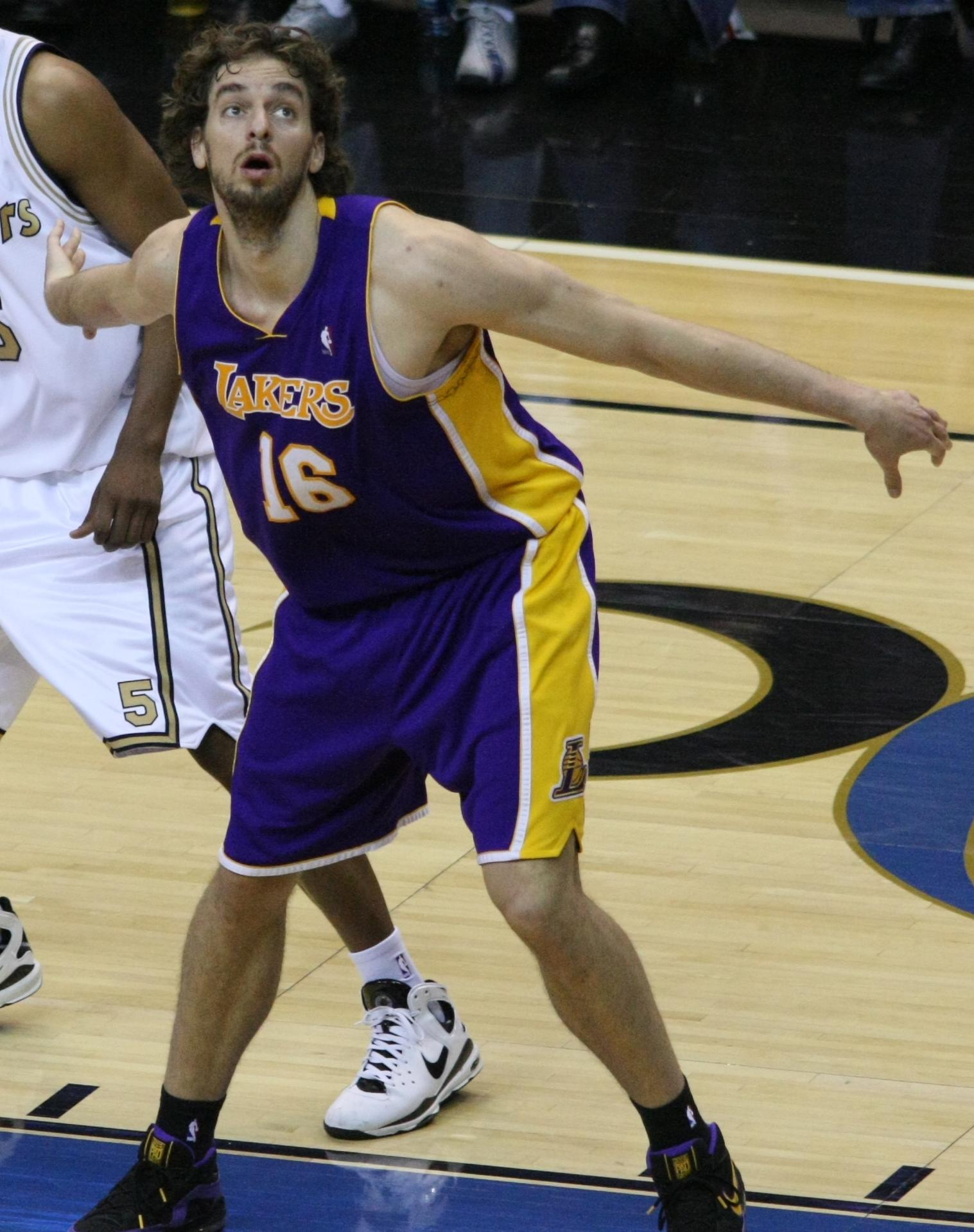
Gasol boxing out with the Los Angeles Lakers, 2008

On February 1, 2008, Memphis traded Gasol to the Los Angeles Lakers along with a 2010 second round draft pick for Kwame Brown, Javaris Crittenton, Aaron McKie, the rights to Marc Gasol (Pau's younger brother), and 2008 and 2010 first round draft picks. There has been some controversy surrounding the trade. Chris Wallace denied in an ESPN article that he had been ordered by owner Michael Heisley to make the Grizzlies more attractive to a potential buyer. Wallace said, "No one put pressure on me to do this, and Michael Heisley has actually been reluctant to move Pau." He also said that they had been "trolling" the waters for a while and dealt with a number of teams. He selected the Lakers deal because "it didn't get any better than this." When Gasol departed the Grizzlies, he held twelve franchise records, including games played, minutes played, field goals made, free throws made and attempted, offensive, defensive, and total rebounds, blocked shots, turnovers, and points. Per game statistics, he leads Memphis in defensive and total rebounds along with blocked shots.

After being traded to the Lakers, Gasol lived in Redondo Beach, across the street from the shoreline. On February 5, Gasol made his first Lakers appearance in a game against the New Jersey Nets, during which he scored 24 points and had 12 rebounds in a 105–90 win over the Nets. On March 14, Gasol sprained his ankle in a game against the New Orleans Hornets, stepping on the foot of teammate Vladimir Radmanović in the first quarter. Gasol was expected to miss the remaining three games of the Lakers' road trip after x-rays came up negative. Gasol returned to the starting lineup on April 2 against the Portland Trail Blazers and played nearly thirty-two minutes, registering 10 points, six rebounds and seven assists. He admitted to feeling limited with the swelling in his ankle still present. Gasol helped the Lakers finish the regular season with the best record in the Western Conference (57–25), with him in the starting lineup the Lakers went 22–5. Kobe Bryant has also stated that playing with Gasol clicked from the start.

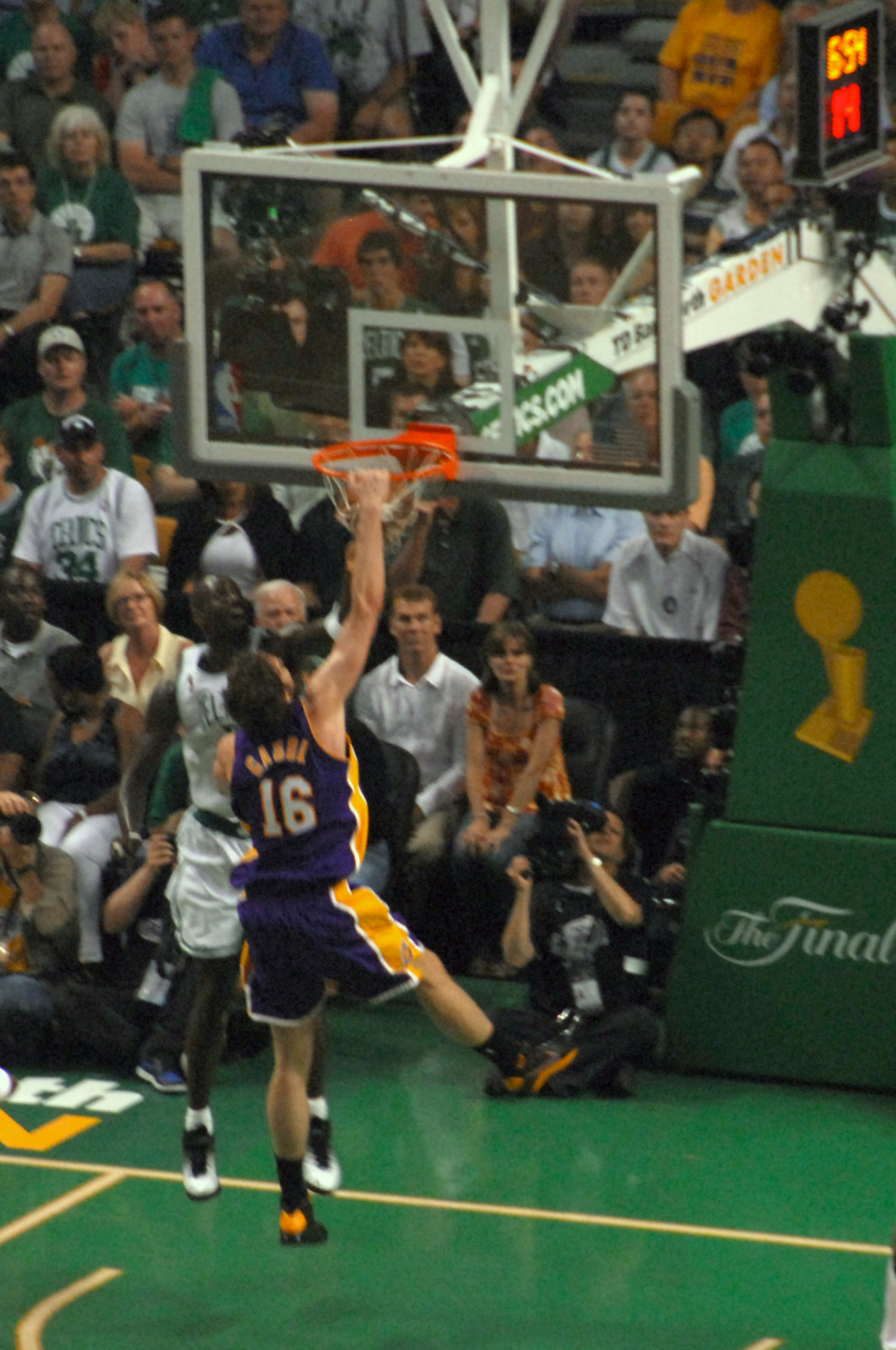
Dunk by Gasol in Game 2 of the 2008 NBA Finals vs. the Boston Celtics

In the Lakers' opening game of the playoffs, he contributed 36 points, 16 rebounds, 8 assists and 3 blocked shots. When the Lakers swept the Denver Nuggets in the first round, it was Gasol's first trip to the second round in four tries. His previous team, the Grizzlies, failed to reach the playoffs for the second year in a row. He contributed 17 points and 13 rebounds in Game 6 against the Utah Jazz to help the Lakers advance to the conference finals. On May 31, he recorded a career high 19 rebounds in a series-clinching win against the San Antonio Spurs, and he became the first Spaniard to reach the NBA Finals. Gasol scored 14.7 points per game on .532 shooting in the 2008 Finals against the Boston Celtics, which was below his scoring average of 18.9 during the regular season, However, he led the Lakers in rebounding with 10.2 per game throughout the championship series, up from his regular-season average of 8.4. Los Angeles lost in six games against Boston in the Finals, including a 131–92 loss in Game 6. In the Playoffs, Gasol was the second leading Laker in points (16.9), rebounds (9.3) and assists per game (4.0). He was the leader in blocks per game (1.90) and was tied with Lamar Odom with the most postseason double-doubles (10).

On January 2, 2009, in a win against the Utah Jazz, Gasol scored his 10,000th career point. Gasol earned his second All-Star appearance as a reserve for the Western Conference squad during the 2008–09 NBA season, his first as a Laker. He was also named Western Conference Player of the Month after helping the Lakers to an 11–2 record for the month of February that included road wins over Boston and Cleveland. He finished the regular season with averages of 18.9 points, 9.6 rebounds, 3.5 assists, and 1 block per game. Gasol then won his first NBA championship ring when the Lakers defeated the Orlando Magic in the 2009 Finals.

On December 24, 2009, Gasol signed a 3-year extension with the Lakers worth $64.7 million. Gasol earned his third All-Star appearance as a reserve for the Western Conference and finished the regular season with averages of 18.3 points, 11.3 rebounds, 3.4 assists, and 1.7 blocks. In Game 6 of the first round, Gasol grabbed 18 rebounds and his last-second putback eliminated the Oklahoma City Thunder. In the conference semifinals against the Utah Jazz, he averaged 23.5 points and 14.5 rebounds, and finally in the conference finals against the Phoenix Suns, he averaged 19.7 points with 7.2 rebounds. In Game 7 of the NBA Finals against the Boston Celtics, Gasol scored 19 points, (6–16 FGM-A, 7–13 FTM-A) grabbed 18 rebounds and recorded two blocks as the Lakers repeated as champions. He averaged 18.6 points, 11.6 rebounds, and 2.6 blocks per game in the series, on a 47.8% field goal percentage. In 2010, he was chosen as the 15th-smartest athlete in sports by Sporting News.

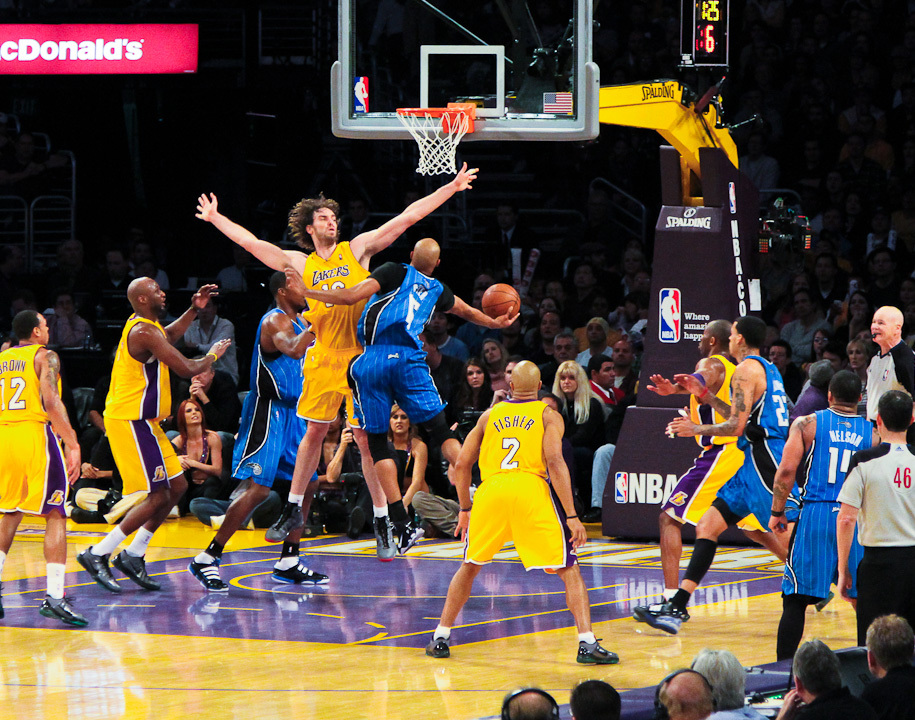
Gasol attempts to block a shot by Vince Carter, 2010

Challenged by Lakers' coach Phil Jackson to be more assertive while Bryant recovered from offseason knee surgery, Gasol started the season's first week averaging 25.3 points on 52.5 percent shooting, 10.3 rebounds, and five assists per game as the Lakers started 3–0. He was named Western Conference Player of the Week. He earned his third straight All-Star selection and his season averages of 19 points and 10 rebounds were nearly identical to what he had put up as a Laker the previous three seasons. Pau's play also merited him All-NBA second team honors for the first time in his career. In the playoffs, Gasol only averaged 13 points on 42% shooting over 10 games, and the Lakers were swept by the Dallas Mavericks in the second round. Gasol had the worst post season performance of his career. Lakers Hall of Famer and ESPN analyst Magic Johnson cited Gasol as a possible trade option for the Lakers to acquire Magic center Dwight Howard. Gasol ignored the false reports about his relationship status with his girlfriend as the cause of his poor performance and has accepted the criticism of his play as valid.

==== 2011–2014: Failed trade and final years with Lakers ====
During the 2011–12 NBA season, Gasol and teammate Lamar Odom were subjected to trade rumors involving former New Orleans Hornets guard Chris Paul. After the trade fell through, Gasol vowed that it would not affect the way he played. Odom, on the other hand, was angry at the Lakers and was traded to the 2010–11 NBA champion Dallas Mavericks for a future first round pick. After Lakers co-captain Derek Fisher was traded in March 2012, Gasol joined Bryant as co-captains of the team. He won the 2011–12 seasonlong NBA Community Assist Award.

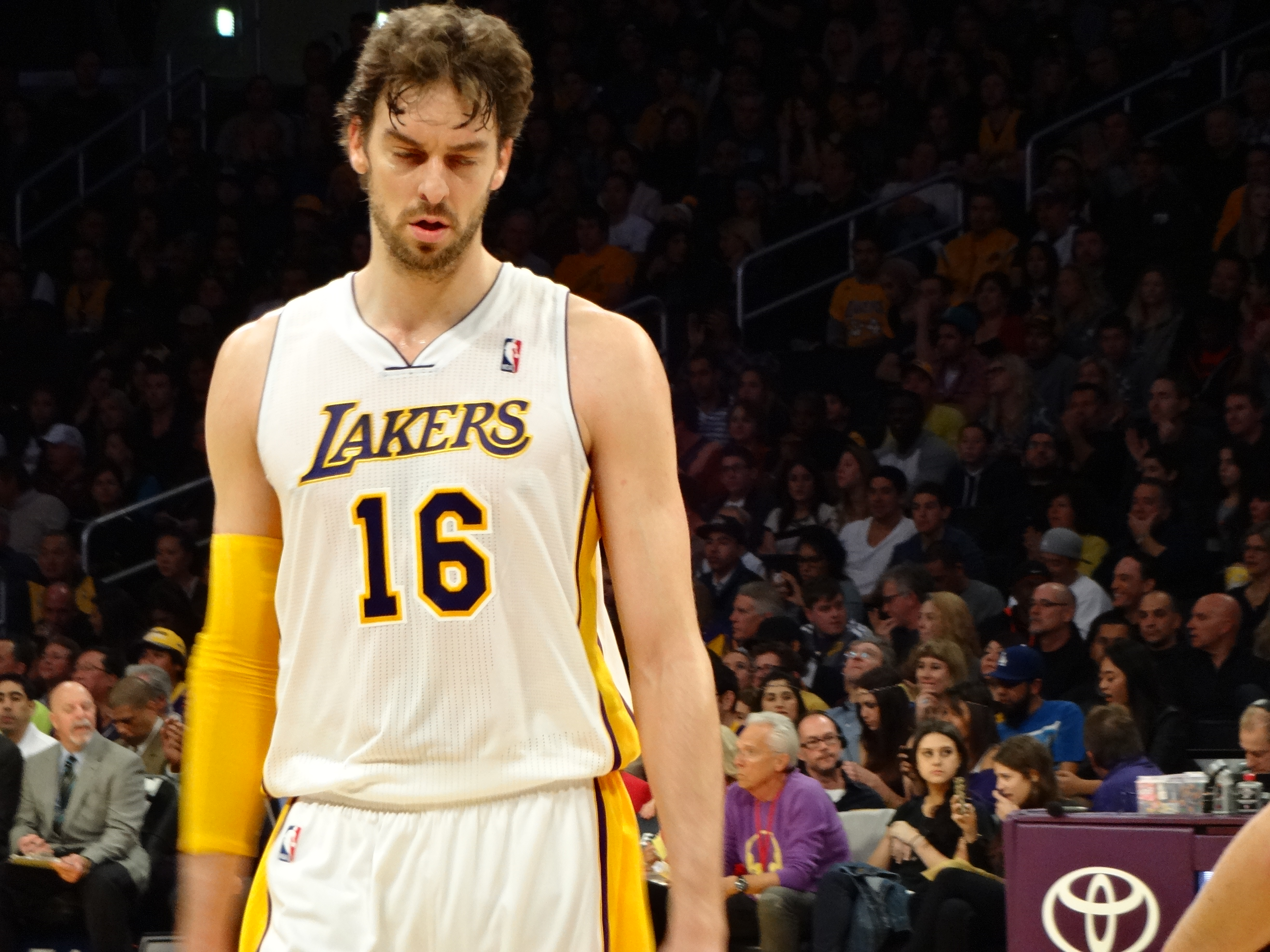
Gasol in 2013 came off the bench after starting 345 games for the Lakers.

After a 1–4 start to the 2012–13 season, the Lakers replaced head coach Mike Brown with Mike D'Antoni. Gasol was struggling after seven games under D'Antoni, averaging 10.1 points and 8.0 rebounds while shooting 38.8 percent, and he was benched in the fourth quarter in multiple games. The team had difficulties getting Gasol involved in D'Antoni's offense, which historically had not had post players playing forward. Gasol ranked only 27th in the league in post-up points with 2.7 per game, down from prior seasons when he was fifth in 2010–11 and ninth in 2011–12. On November 18, 2012, in a win against the Houston Rockets, Gasol scored his 15,000th career point. Bothered by tendinitis in both knees since training camp, Gasol sat out eight games in December before returning to the starting lineup. Later, he was diagnosed with plantar fasciitis, but continued playing. General manager Mitch Kupchak told Lakers season-ticket holders the team needed Gasol to be more involved. On January 7, 2013, Gasol received a blow to the face from Denver's JaVale McGee in the fourth quarter of a 112–105 loss. He suffered a concussion, forcing him to miss the next five games. In his first game back, he came off the bench after having started his first 345 games with the Lakers. In the next game, he returned to the starting lineup and scored 25 points against Toronto, only his second 20-point game of the season. However, in the next game on January 21, D'Antoni moved Gasol to a reserve role and started Earl Clark, a change the coach considered permanent. On February 5 against the Brooklyn Nets, Gasol tore the plantar fascia of his right foot. Gasol had tweaked the fascia in the first half, but played through the soreness until he felt it pop when he tried to block a shot by Brook Lopez towards the end of the game. He returned over six weeks later on March 22 after missing 20 games, with D'Antoni returning him to the starting lineup over Clark. After a two-game adjustment period, Gasol's play was solid, and Bryant insisted that Gasol receive the ball in the post. D'Antoni stated that Gasol had played well since January, and attributed the forward's earlier struggles to injuries and the team's evolving offensive system. "I have a lot more confidence in him now, and he's playing great", D'Antoni said. He finished the season with career lows in points (13.7) and field-goal percentage (.466), and his rebounds (8.6) were his lowest since his first season with Los Angeles. He was limited to a career-low 49 games. However, he had three triple-doubles in his last seven games including the playoffs.

Gasol was owed $19.3 million in 2013–14 in the final year of his contract, which cost the Lakers around $50 million including luxury taxes. He became a free agent after the season.

=== Chicago Bulls (2014–2016) ===
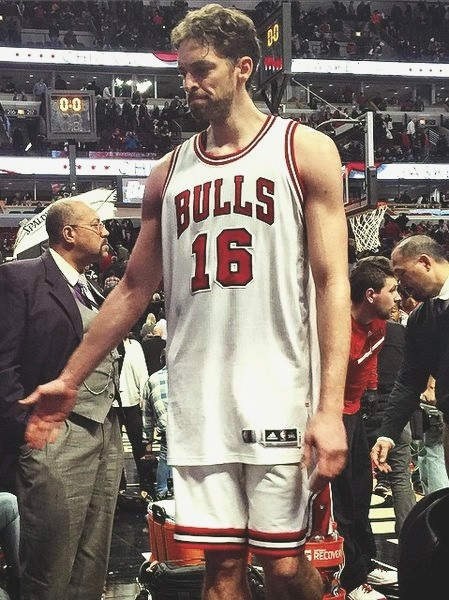
Gasol with the Bulls in 2015

On July 18, 2014, Gasol signed with the Chicago Bulls on a three-year, $22 million contract with a player option in the final season. He said after he was introduced: "It was a gut feeling. I thought Chicago was going to be the best fit for me. It's a great challenge, but I'm driven by challenge. I look forward to it."

On January 1, 2015, Gasol recorded a career-high 9 blocks, along with 17 points and 9 rebounds, in the 106–101 win over the Denver Nuggets. Ten days later, he scored a career-high 46 points on 17-of-30 shooting in a 95–87 win over the Milwaukee Bucks. On April 9, 2015, he recorded a league-best 51st double-double of the season with 16 points and 15 rebounds in an 89–78 win over the Miami Heat. He recorded his 54th double-double of the season in the regular season finale on April 15 against the Atlanta Hawks to finish as the league-leader in double-doubles in 2014–15.

On December 5, 2015, Gasol became the 116th player to reach 1,000 regular-season games. He had 13 points and 11 rebounds against the Charlotte Hornets for his ninth double-double of the season. On January 25, 2016, he recorded his first career first quarter double-double with 13 points and 10 rebounds. He finished the game with 19 points and 17 rebounds, as the Bulls were defeated by the Miami Heat 89–84. On February 9, Gasol was named as his Chicago Bulls teammate Jimmy Butler's replacement on the 2016 Eastern Conference All-Star squad. On February 27, he recorded his eighth career triple-double and first as a Bull with 22 points, 16 rebounds and a career-high 14 assists in a 103–95 loss to the Portland Trail Blazers. At 35 years old, he became the oldest player to record a triple-double since Kobe Bryant did so at 36 years old in 2014. On March 7, he recorded his second triple-double of the season with 12 points, 17 rebounds and 13 assists in a 100–90 win over the Milwaukee Bucks, becoming just the fourth player 35 years or older with multiple triple-doubles in a season, joining Jason Kidd, Kobe Bryant and Paul Pierce. On April 2, in a loss to the Detroit Pistons, he became the 38th NBA player to reach 10,000 career rebounds. He also became the 36th with 10,000 points and 10,000 rebounds.

=== San Antonio Spurs (2016–2019) ===
On July 14, 2016, Gasol signed a two-year, $30 million contract that had a player option in the second year with the San Antonio Spurs. On November 11, 2016, he had season highs with 21 points and six assists in a 96–86 win over the Detroit Pistons. On January 19, 2017, he was ruled out indefinitely after breaking his left ring finger during pregame warmups earlier that night. He underwent surgery the following day to repair a fracture of his left fourth metacarpal. On February 24, 2017, in a 105–97 win over the Los Angeles Clippers, Gasol had 17 points and 11 rebounds off the bench in his return from a 15-game absence because of the finger injury. On April 12, 2017, Gasol scored 13 points to reach 20,000 career points in a 101–97 regular-season finale loss against the Utah Jazz, becoming the second European player to reach the mark after Dirk Nowitzki.

On July 24, 2017, Gasol re-signed with the Spurs on a three-year, $48 million contract. On December 20, 2017, he had 20 points and a season-high 17 rebounds in a 93–91 win over the Portland Trail Blazers. On December 23, 2017, he recorded his 10th career triple-double with 14 points, 11 rebounds and a season-high 10 assists in a 108–99 win over the Sacramento Kings. On December 26, 2017, in a 109–97 win over the Brooklyn Nets, Gasol collected his 10,817th rebound, moving him past Jack Sikma for 30th in league history. On January 26, 2018, in a 97–78 loss to the Philadelphia 76ers, Gasol became the 34th player in NBA history to play 40,000 career minutes. On March 25, 2018, he had 22 points on 10-of-15 shooting and grabbed 13 rebounds in a 106–103 loss to the Milwaukee Bucks.

After appearing in the first nine games of the 2018–19 season, Gasol missed the next 26 games with a stress fracture in his right foot. On March 1, 2019, he was released by the Spurs in a buyout agreement.

=== Milwaukee Bucks (2019) ===
On March 3, 2019, Gasol signed with the Milwaukee Bucks. He played in three games for the Bucks. On March 23, it was reported that the Bucks expected Gasol to miss the next month due to a left ankle injury. Gasol's injury ended his season. He was unable to play in the playoffs and had surgery on his injured foot on May 9, 2019.

=== Return to Barcelona (2021) ===
On July 25, 2019, Gasol signed with the Portland Trail Blazers. On November 20, he was waived by the Trail Blazers without having played in a game for the team.

On February 23, 2021, Gasol returned to Spain to play in Liga ACB club FC Barcelona. He won the 2020–21 ACB championship with Barcelona and helped the team reach the final of the 2020–21 EuroLeague, where they lost to Anadolu Efes.

On October 5, 2021, Gasol announced his retirement from professional basketball.

== National team career ==
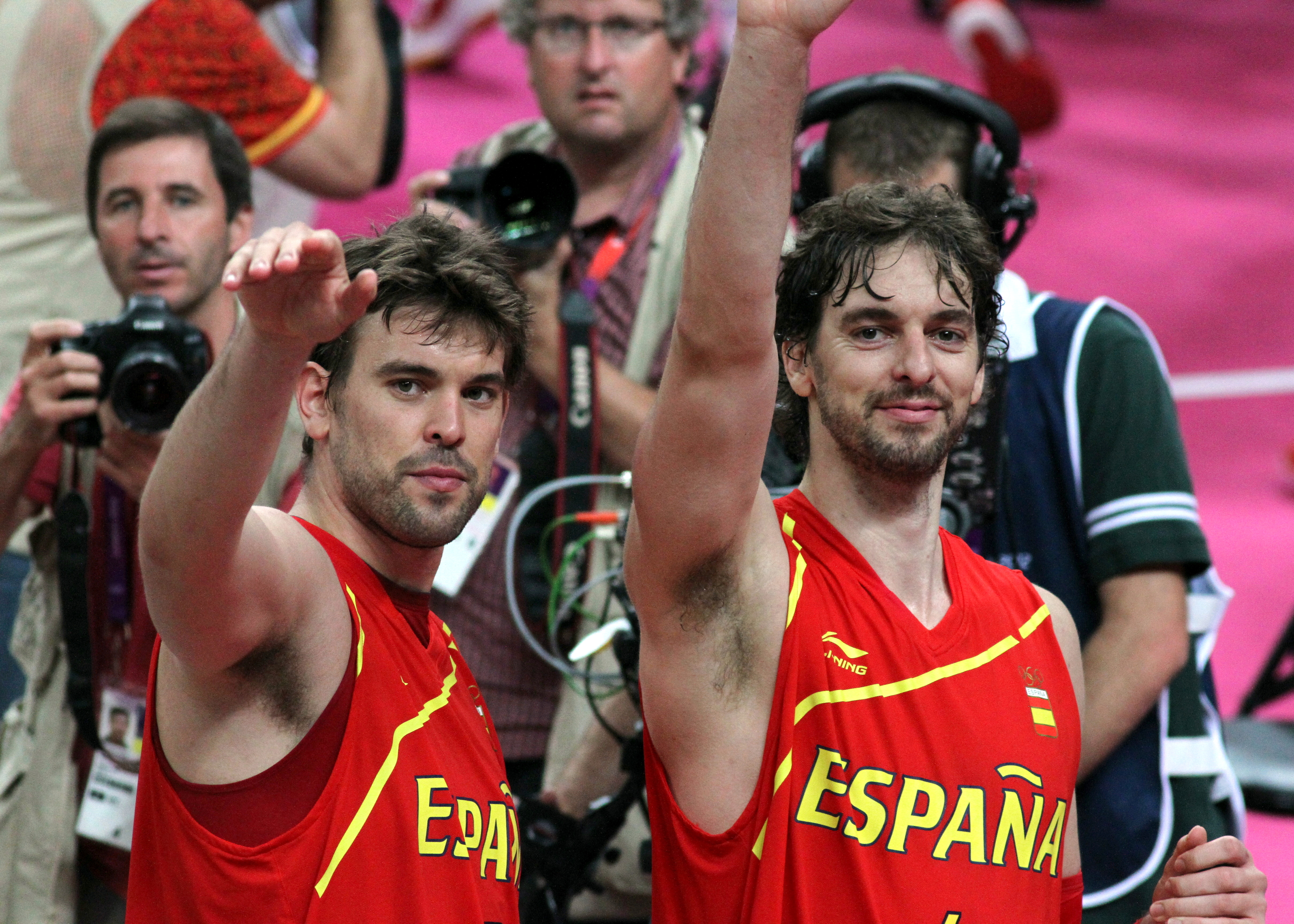
Pau Gasol with brother Marc at the 2012 Summer Olympics

Gasol's first competition with the senior Spain national basketball team was the 2001 EuroBasket tournament, after having previously won the 1998 FIBA Europe Under-18 Championship and 1999 FIBA Under-19 World Championship with the Spanish junior teams. Being considered, against his own will, the leader of the team, Gasol ended up with the bronze medal in the competition. Gasol was named the Spanish Sportsman of the Year, in 2001. After that, Gasol had a lot more success with the Spanish team, winning the 2006 FIBA World Championship and the 2009 and 2011 EuroBasket tournaments, being chosen as the Most Valuable Player in the first two; he also won silver medals at the 2003 and 2007 EuroBasket, and the 2008 and 2012 Olympic Games.

Gasol was also the highest-scoring player of the 2004 Summer Olympics, and Spain's flag bearer at the opening ceremony of the 2012 Summer Olympics, replacing the injured Rafael Nadal. In 2014, Gasol was named to the All-tournament team of the 2014 FIBA Basketball World Cup. In the 2015 EuroBasket, Gasol was named the MVP of the competition, after some amazing performances, averaging 25.6 points and 8.8 rebounds per game (he was the competition leader for points per game, and 4th in rebounds per game). During the knockout matches of the competition, Gasol inspired the Spanish side which was missing many of its stars like Ricky Rubio, Juan Carlos Navarro, Álex Abrines, and his brother Marc Gasol. Gasol scored 40 points in the semifinal against France, which was half of his team's points. The 35-year-old player was also named the competition's leader for blocked shots per game (2.3).

On September 7, 2017, in a game against Hungary, Gasol became FIBA EuroBasket's all-time leading scorer, passing Tony Parker with 1,033 points. He ended up at 1,183 total points scored at the EuroBasket. He was named to the FIBA EuroBasket 2000–2020 Dream Team in 2020.

=== International Olympic Committee Athletes' Commission ===
In August 2021, Gasol was elected as a member of the IOC Athletes' Commission. Since February 2026, he has chaired this commission, where he advocates for athletes' interests, participates in organizing future IOC events, and promotes physical activity among the general public. In doing so, Gasol became the first Spaniard to chair the committee.

=== Role with FIBA ===
In 2022, a partnership with FIBA was formalized with Gasol's appointment as a global ambassador for the FIBA Women's World Cup in Australia. He took on the same role for the 2023 Men's World Cup and is serving as an ambassador once again for the 2026 Women's World Cup.

== Player profile ==
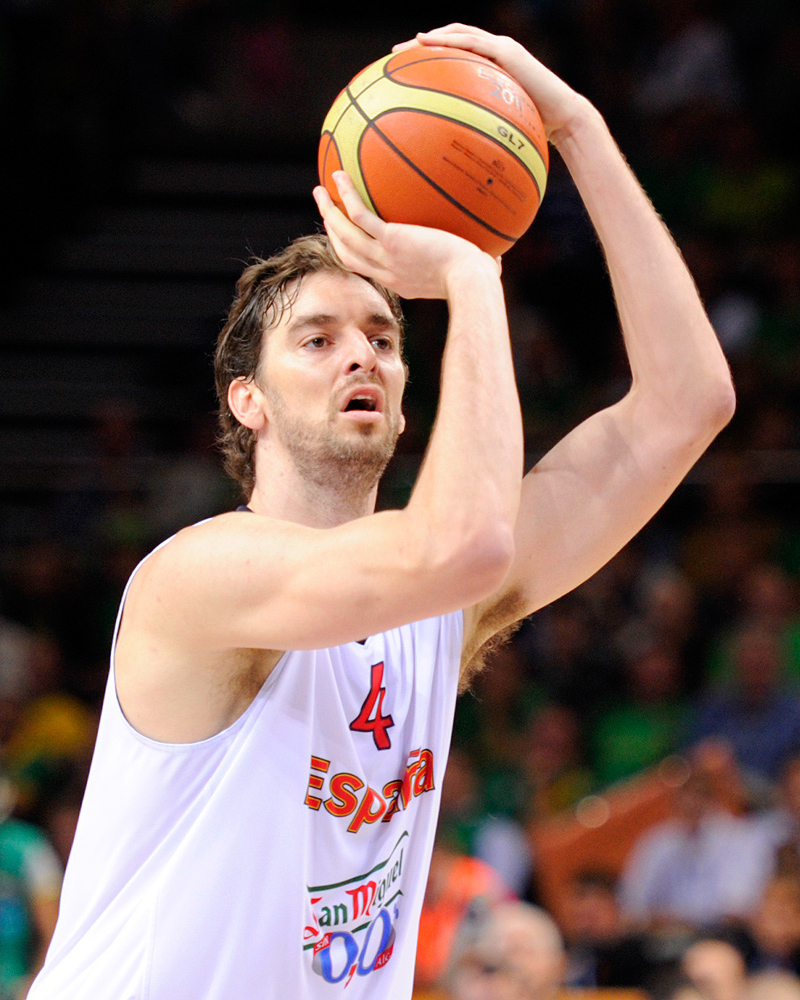
Gasol during EuroBasket 2011

Listed at 7 feet 0 inches (2.13 m), (Note: Gasol was listed at 7 feet 0 inches (2.13 m) until 2019–20, when it increased by one inch (25 mm) after the NBA standardized measurements across the league.) Gasol was athletic for his size, allowing him to play both the power forward and center positions, much like fellow European players Toni Kukoč and Dirk Nowitzki. He was a refined scorer in the post and midrange; his overall game was near-ambidextrous, making it difficult for opposing teams to defend. Gasol used a variety of midrange jumpers, hook shots, up-and-under moves, and shot fakes to score very efficiently. In addition, his foot speed relative to his size allowed him to run the fast break and finish effectively. He was also a skilled passer for a big man, earning 3.2 assists per game over his career. Defensively, he is an above-average shot blocker with a career average of 1.7 blocks per game. Kobe Bryant said of Gasol, "You'd be hard-pressed to find a big [man] with his skill set in the history of the game."

Gasol recorded over 550 double-doubles in his NBA career. On April 2, 2016, he became the 36th player in NBA history to reach the 10,000-point/10,000-rebound mark. While Gasol became the 43rd player in NBA history to reach to the 20,000-point milestone, he is just the fourth with that many points, 10,000 rebounds, 3,500 assists and 1,500 blocks.

== Personal life ==
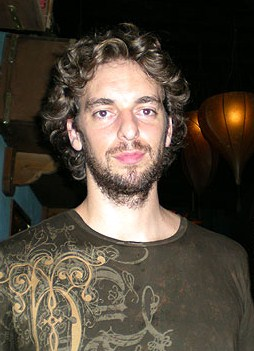
Gasol in 2008

Gasol remains strongly interested in medicine. He regularly visits Children's Hospital of Los Angeles, a standard stop for athletes making charitable visits in the L.A. area, but does not limit his business to visiting young patients. On one visit, he asked a group of doctors well-informed questions about their treatment of children with scoliosis. In April 2010, Gasol was scheduled to sit in on a spinal surgery, wearing surgical scrubs, with Dr. David Skaggs, the hospital's chief of orthopedic surgery. Skaggs has said, "We talk to him now almost like he is a surgical colleague." Gasol canceled his original plans to observe a surgery when he came down with a low-grade fever the day before the operation, not wishing to risk infecting anyone at the hospital. He was able to reschedule his observation for June 2010, witnessing Skaggs lead a team operating on a 13-year-old girl from Colorado with scoliosis.

Gasol has a broad range of intellectual and cultural interests. He has taught himself Italian and French to go along with his childhood languages of Catalan and Spanish plus English. While with the Lakers, he and Kobe Bryant spoke to one another during games in Spanish to keep opponents from knowing their plans. Gasol also regularly reads historical novels, plays French classical music on his keyboard, and attends concerts and operas; he is a friend of Spanish tenor Plácido Domingo, and often visits him backstage after performances.

Gasol married Catherine McDonnell in July 2019. He posted a photo of his wedding on his Instagram account. The couple's daughter Elisabet Gianna Gasol was born on September 13, 2020. Elisabet's middle name is a tribute to Bryant's late daughter and Bryant's widow Vanessa is her godmother. In December 2022, the couple announced the arrival of a son, Max.

His younger brother Marc, who is 6 feet 11 inches (2.11 m) tall and weighs 255 pounds (116 kg), also played for the Los Angeles Lakers. Marc was drafted by the Los Angeles Lakers, 48th overall, in the 2007 NBA draft and his rights were traded to the Memphis Grizzlies, as part of the deal that sent Gasol to the Lakers. Their youngest brother, Adrià, played for Lausanne's basketball team; his coach at Lausanne said, "He's built like Pau, with a mean streak like Marc", although he was not at the time considered a major basketball prospect. After returning to Spain for his final two years of high school basketball, Adrià enrolled at University of California, Los Angeles (UCLA) in August 2012 and joined the UCLA basketball team as a walk on.

His parents moved to the Memphis suburb of Germantown, Tennessee, after he signed with the Grizzlies, and enrolled his younger brothers Marc and Adrià in Lausanne Collegiate School in Memphis. They planned to move to the Los Angeles area when Pau was traded to the Lakers, with Agustí accepting a job with a health-care company in that area; although the Grizzlies obtained the rights to Marc's services as part of the trade, he was expected to re-sign with his Spanish team Akasvayu Girona. However, when Marc decided to sign with the Grizzlies, their parents chose to stay in Germantown. Agustí now works from home for the same company, while Marisa now volunteers at St. Jude Children's Research Hospital.

=== Gasol16 Ventures ===
In late 2025, he announced the creation of Gasol16 Ventures, an investment and business advisory firm chaired by Pau Gasol himself. Its goal is to maximize the potential of the companies with which the former athlete becomes involved. Through this entity, he participates in companies within the sports, health, and wellness sectors.

In June 2026, he announced a €55 million investment to foster the professionalization, internationalization, and expansion of Liga F clubs, marking the largest private contribution to the league.

== Work and social commitment ==
In 2003, he was named a UNICEF ambassador, and since then has repeatedly taken part in different campaigns, traveling on several occasions África to participate in its projects there. In recognition of his commitment to solidarity endeavors, he received the Corazón de Oro (Gold Heart) in 2004, awarded by the Spanish Heart Foundation, and the 2010 Charitable Athlete Prize, given by the Fundación SOS. Gasol has worked in support of infant survival and for the rights of children in other African countries as well as in campaigns against malnutrition in the Horn of Africa. In addition, since his arrival in Memphis, he has worked with the Saint Jude Children's Research Hospital, which he visits every time he in the city where he lived at the start of his career.

In 2009, Gasol, along with several other NBA players, joined the "Hoops for St. Jude" charity program benefitting the St. Jude Children's Research Hospital.

In 2010, UNICEF's Pau Project commenced in Ethiopia, to aid in the fight against infant malnutrition, which each year claims the lives of more than 2 million children, and for the right to an education. In December 2010 he took part, along with other NBA stars, in We Are Bigger Than Aids, a campaign against the HIV virus.

In 2012, the Professional Basketball Writers Association (PBWA) stated that Pau "personifies everything that is good about NBA players and their charity projects, not only in their own communities but all over the world, working to help children achieve their goals and have the opportunities that they wouldn't be able to get otherwise." Thus, in April 2015, they gave him their Magic Johnson Award.

In September 2018, after the publication of his book Bajo el aro (Under the Hoop) Gasol said that in spite of not being a doctor, he tries to use his public profile to help others. That same month, he joined the campaign of Spain's Fundación Atresmedia to bring families into schools.

In July 2019, he was named Global Champion for Nutrition and Zero Childhood Obesity by UNICEF Global.

=== Gasol Foundation ===
In 2013, along with his brother Marc, he established the Gasol Foundation, to help to promote community health and healthy living habits, especially by preventing and fighting childhood obesity. In November 2015, after having been named Global Impact Player by the National Basketball Players Association (NBPA), which represents the NBA players, he created a t-shirt to help the Foundation's work. In March 2017 they decided to move the Foundation's headquarters from Barcelona to Sant Boi, where he was born. Along with his brother Marc Gasol, he has received the Special Recognition Prize from Estrategia NAOS for the work of the Gasol Foundation for fighting childhood obesity.

In September 2019, the Gasol Foundation presented the Estudio Pasos, a pioneering work in studying obesity levels in kids between 8 and 18 years of age, and which also threw light on the levels of physical inactivity among children and adolescents. At the press conference to present the study, Pau Gasol called for concrete action from governments, families and the food industry to end this problem.

In early 2025, the Gasol Foundation signed an agreement with the Spanish Ministry of Health to develop the National Strategic Plan for the Reduction of Childhood Obesity (PENROI). In June 2025, the foundation organized the inaugural Gasol Foundation Golf Invitational, a charity tournament featuring athletes such as Rafa Nadal, Rudy Fernández, and Álvaro Morata. Held at La Hacienda Links Golf Resort, the event raised €116,000 to fight childhood obesity; the second edition of the event took place in June 2026.

In May 2025, Movistar Plus+ premiered *Childhood Obesity: The Ignored Pandemic* (*Obesidad infantil. La pandemia ignorada*), an original documentary by TBS and the Gasol Foundation. The film addresses childhood obesity as a public health challenge by sharing the personal stories of families in Spain, Europe, and the United States who are facing the issue without the necessary resources.

=== Pau Gasol Academy ===
Founded in 2004, the Pau Gasol Academy is a basketball skills camp held annually in Barcelona during the first week of July. It aims to become a benchmark for training by fostering the holistic development of players, including education on healthy habits. Designed for children aged 8 to 17, the camp comprises three sections:

Pau Gasol Academy Classic, a recreational and sports program for boys and girls looking to improve their game; Rising Stars, aimed at 36 players selected from among the best in Europe, with the goal of teaching them how to balance their athletic development with their academic education; and Special Olympics, aimed at players with intellectual disabilities.

Each year, the academy features top-tier international coaches and players. Notable past guests include Silvia Domínguez, Jarred Vanderbilt, Jusuf Nurkic, Phil Handy, Anna Montañana, Jaume Ponsarnau, and Pedro Martínez. Since 2018, the academy has been known as the Pau Gasol Academy by Santander Bank, with the bank serving as its main sponsor.

The 2026 edition, held in Barcelona from June 29 to July 4, saw the highest level of international participation to date, as well as the highest female participation in the event's history.

=== Defending equality in sports ===
In May 2018, he published an open letter in The Players Tribune defending the role of women as coaches and specifically in favor of the candidacy of Becky Hammon as an NBA coach. He noted that in its 72 years of history there has never been a woman coach and advocated adopting new social norms to meet this changing period of equality and diversity.

=== Membership in sporting associations and clubs ===
From 2017 to 2020, he was vice president of the NBPA (National Basketball Players Association, of the NBA). He was the first player to participate in the executive committee of this association without previously having been in the NCAA.

Since June 2019, Pau Gasol has been a member of the Advisory Council of Spanish Sport (CADE), which is part of the Association of Spanish Sport (ADESP). In addition, he is Strategic Advisor and Global Ambassador for Barça in the United States. From this position he defends the values of sports and the proposals toward healthy living advocated by his Foundation.

== Career statistics ==
Legend
GP	Games played	GS	Games started	MPG	Minutes per game
FG%	Field goal percentage	3P%	3-point field goal percentage	FT%	Free throw percentage
RPG	Rebounds per game	APG	Assists per game	SPG	Steals per game
BPG	Blocks per game	PPG	Points per game	**Bold**	Career high
†	Won an NBA championship	*	Led the league

=== NBA ===
==== Regular season ====
Year	Team	GP	GS	MPG	FG%	3P%	FT%	RPG	APG	SPG	BPG	PPG
2001–02	Memphis	**82**	79	36.7	.518	.200	.709	8.9	2.7	.5	**2.1**	17.6
2002–03	Memphis	**82**	**82***	36.0	.510	.100	.736	8.8	2.8	.4	1.8	19.0
2003–04	Memphis	78	78	31.5	.482	.267	.714	7.7	2.5	.6	1.7	17.7
2004–05	Memphis	56	53	32.0	.514	.167	.768	7.3	2.4	**.7**	1.7	17.8
2005–06	Memphis	80	80	**39.2**	.503	.250	.689	8.9	**4.6**	.6	1.9	20.4
2006–07	Memphis	59	59	36.2	.538	.273	.748	9.8	3.4	.5	**2.1**	**20.8**
2007–08	Memphis	39	39	36.7	.501	.267	.819	8.8	3.0	.4	1.4	18.9
2007–08	L.A. Lakers	27	27	34.0	**.589**	.000	.789	7.8	3.5	.5	1.6	18.8
2008–09†	L.A. Lakers	81	81	37.0	.567	.500	.781	9.6	3.5	.6	1.0	18.9
2009–10†	L.A. Lakers	65	65	37.0	.536	.000	.790	11.3	3.4	.6	1.7	18.3
2010–11	L.A. Lakers	**82**	**82***	37.0	.529	.333	**.823**	10.2	3.3	.6	1.6	18.8
2011–12	L.A. Lakers	65	65	37.4	.501	.259	.782	10.4	3.6	.6	1.4	17.4
2012–13	L.A. Lakers	49	42	33.8	.466	.286	.702	8.6	4.1	.5	1.2	13.7
2013–14	L.A. Lakers	60	60	31.4	.480	.286	.736	9.7	3.4	.5	1.5	17.4
2014–15	Chicago	78	78	34.4	.494	.462	.803	**11.8**	2.7	.3	1.9	18.5
2015–16	Chicago	72	72	31.8	.469	.348	.792	11.0	4.1	.6	2.0	16.5
2016–17	San Antonio	64	39	25.4	.502	**.538**	.707	7.8	2.3	.4	1.1	12.4
2017–18	San Antonio	77	63	23.5	.458	.358	.756	8.0	3.1	.3	1.0	10.1
2018–19	San Antonio	27	6	12.2	.466	.500	.711	4.7	1.9	.2	.5	4.2
2018–19	Milwaukee	3	0	10.0	.167	.333	.500	3.3	.7	.0	.3	1.3
Career		1,226	1,150	33.4	.507	.368	.753	9.2	3.2	.5	1.6	17.0
All-Star		6	1	19.3	.565	.000	.846	8.7	1.2	.7	.7	10.5

==== Playoffs ====
Year	Team	GP	GS	MPG	FG%	3P%	FT%	RPG	APG	SPG	BPG	PPG
2004	Memphis	4	4	33.5	.571	–	**.900**	5.0	2.5	**1.0**	1.5	18.5
2005	Memphis	4	4	33.3	.488	**1.000**	.500	7.5	2.5	.5	1.8	**21.3**
2006	Memphis	4	4	39.5	.433	.000	.767	6.8	3.0	.5	1.2	20.3
2008	L.A. Lakers	21	21	39.8	.530	–	.692	9.3	4.0	.5	1.9	16.9
2009†	L.A. Lakers	**23**	**23**	**40.5**	**.580**	–	.714	10.8	2.5	.8	2.0	18.3
2010†	L.A. Lakers	**23**	**23**	39.7	.539	.000	.759	11.1	3.5	.4	**2.1**	19.6
2011	L.A. Lakers	10	10	35.8	.420	.500	.800	7.8	3.8	.4	1.7	13.1
2012	L.A. Lakers	12	12	37.0	.434	.400	.828	9.5	3.7	.5	**2.1**	12.5
2013	L.A. Lakers	4	4	36.5	.481	–	.545	**11.5**	**6.5**	.5	.8	14.0
2015	Chicago	10	10	31.7	.487	.000	.762	9.4	3.1	.5	**2.1**	14.4
2017	San Antonio	16	7	22.8	.439	.333	.708	7.1	1.9	.4	.9	7.7
2018	San Antonio	5	0	18.0	.500	.333	**.900**	4.8	2.8	.0	.2	6.0
Career		136	122	35.5	.508	.297	.741	9.2	3.2	.5	1.7	15.4

=== EuroLeague ===
Year	Team	GP	GS	MPG	FG%	3P%	FT%	RPG	APG	SPG	BPG	PPG	PIR
FIBA EuroLeague
1999–00	Barcelona	**21**	**8**	13.4	.545	.333	.609	2.1	.3	.1	.2	4.3	3.6
EuroLeague
2000–01	Barcelona	6	5	**25.7**	**.667**	**.500**	**.738**	**6.0**	**.7**	**.8**	.7	**18.5**	**22.5**
2020–21	Barcelona	7	2	9.5	.429	**.500**	.714	2.4	.4	.4	**.9**	4.6	6.0
Career		34	15	14.8	.573	.414	.694	2.9	.4	.3	.4	6.9	7.4

== Awards and honors ==
=== NBA ===
- 2× NBA champion 2009, 2010
- 4x All-NBA Team selections
  - 2× Second Team: 2011, 2015
  - 2× Third Team: 2009, 2010
- 6× NBA All-Star 2006, 2009, 2010, 2011, 2015, 2016
- NBA Rookie of the Year Award: 2002
- NBA All-Rookie First Team: 2002
- J. Walter Kennedy Citizenship Award: 2012
- Magic Johnson Award: 2015
- NBA Community Assist Award: 2011–12
- All-Time NBA European First Team (2022)
- Gasol's no. 16 was retired by the Los Angeles Lakers on March 7, 2023

=== Liga ACB and EuroLeague ===
- Spanish League champion: 1999, 2001, 2021
- Spanish League Finals MVP: 2001
- Spanish King's Cup winner: 2001
- Spanish King's Cup MVP: 2001
- All-EuroLeague Second Team: 2001

=== European Player of the Year awards ===
- 2× Mr. Europa: 2004, 2009
- 4× Euroscar: 2008, 2009, 2010, 2015
- 2× FIBA Europe Player of the Year: 2008, 2009
- 2× All-Europeans Player of the Year: 2009, 2010

=== Spanish National Team ===
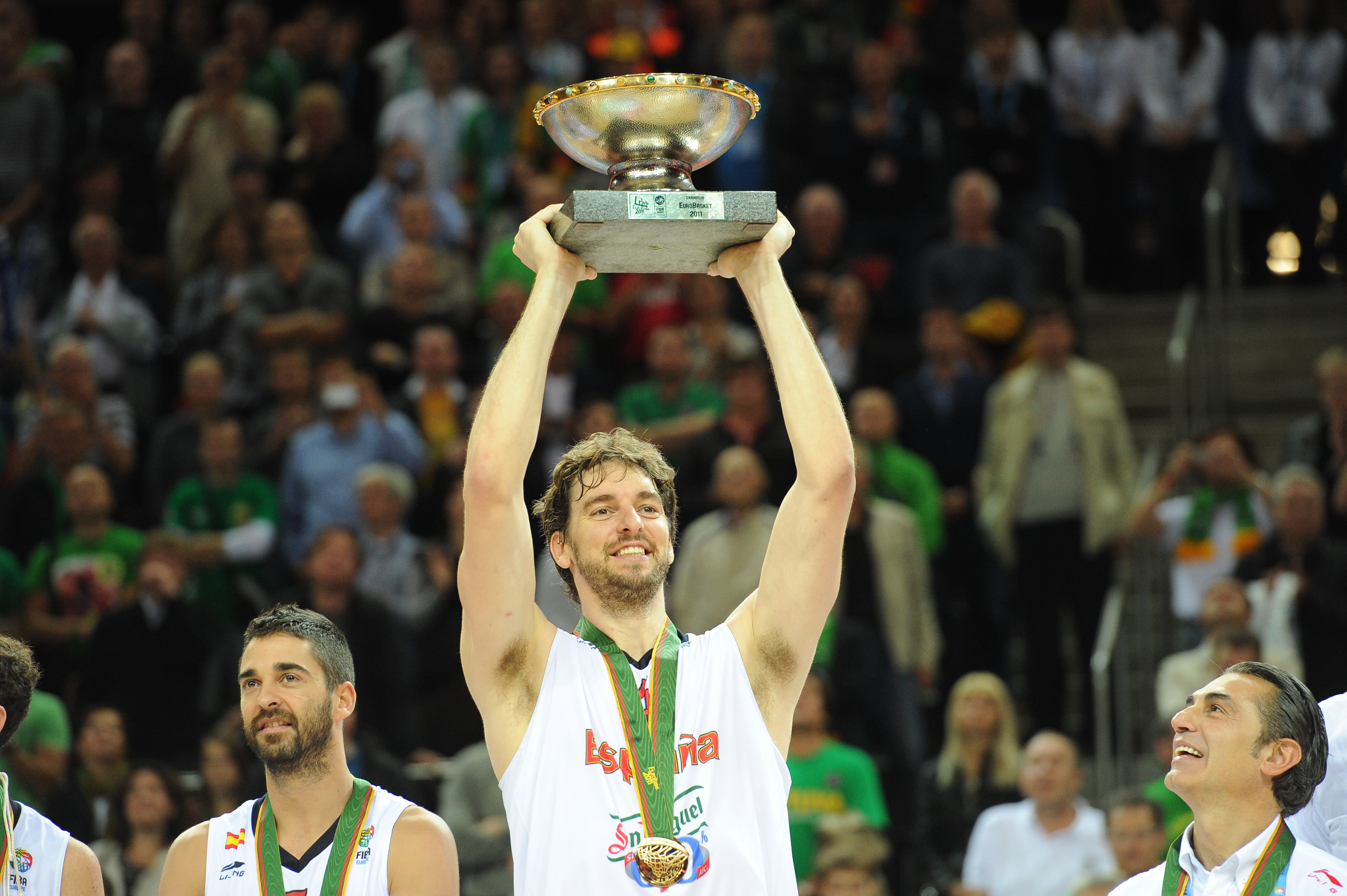
Gasol won the gold with Spain at EuroBasket 2011.

- 2x Olympics silver medalist: 2008, 2012
- Olympics bronze medalist: 2016
- FIBA World Championship gold medalist: 2006
- FIBA World Championship MVP: 2006
- 2x FIBA World Cup All-Tournament Team: 2006, 2014
- 3x EuroBasket gold medalist: 2009, 2011, 2015
- 2x EuroBasket silver medalist: 2003, 2007
- 2x EuroBasket bronze medalist: 2001, 2017
- 2x EuroBasket MVP: 2009, 2015
- 3x EuroBasket Top Scorer: 2003, 2009, 2015
- 7x EuroBasket All-Tournament Team: 2001, 2003, 2017, 2009, 2011, 2015, 2017
- FIBA EuroBasket 2000–2020 Dream Team
- FIBA Europe Under-20 Championship bronze medalist: 2000
- FIBA Under-19 World Championship: gold medalist: 1999
- FIBA Europe Under-18 Championship gold medalist1998
- Spanish Sportsman of the Year: 2001

== See also ==
- List of athletes with the most appearances at Olympic Games
- List of National Basketball Association career scoring leaders
- List of National Basketball Association career rebounding leaders
- List of National Basketball Association career blocks leaders
- List of National Basketball Association career playoff blocks leaders
- List of National Basketball Association career minutes played leaders
- List of European basketball players in the United States
- 2012 Summer Olympics Parade of Nations
- List of UNICEF Goodwill Ambassadors

== Notes ==
Awards and achievements
Olympic Games
Preceded by David Cal	Flagbearer for Spain; London 2012	Succeeded by Rafael Nadal
