= UH88 =

University of Hawai'i 88-inch telescope, at Mauna Kea Observatories

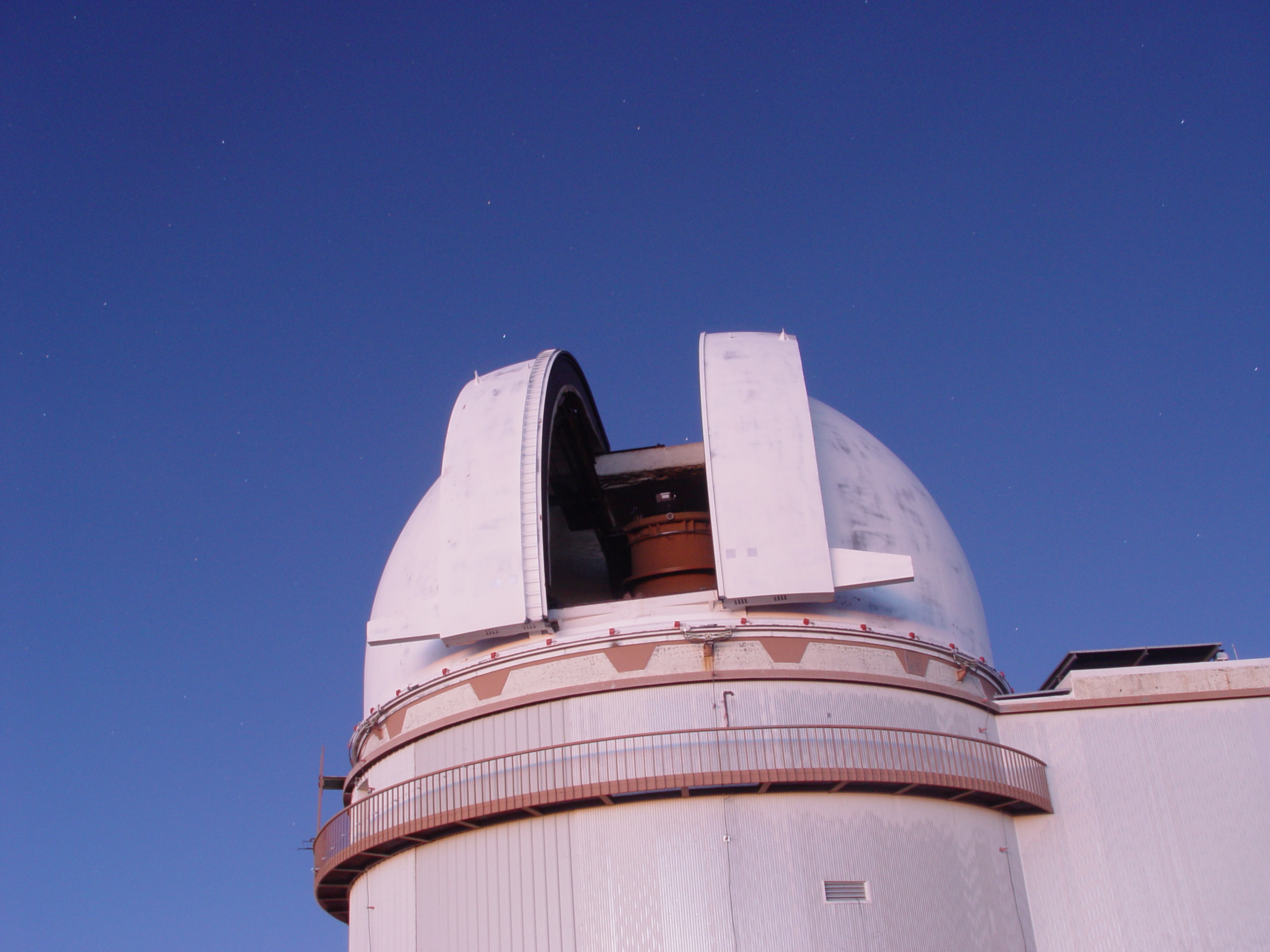
- UH88 at sunset
- Location: Hawaiʻi County, Hawaii
- Coordinates: 19°49′23″N 155°28′12″W
- Observatory code: T12
- Diameter: 2.2 m (7 ft 3 in)
- Website: www.ifa.hawaii.edu/88inch/
- Location within Hawaii
- Related media on Commons

The University of Hawaiʻi 88-inch (2.24-meter) telescope—called UH88, UH2.2, or simply 88 by members of the local astronomical community—is situated at the Mauna Kea Observatories and operated by the University's Institute for Astronomy. It was constructed in 1968, and entered service in 1970, at which point it was known as "The Mauna Kea Observatory". It became one of the first professional telescopes to be controlled by a computer. The telescope was built with funding from NASA, to support Solar System missions, and is controlled by the University of Hawaiʻi. The success of the telescope helped demonstrate the value of Mauna Kea for astronomical observations.

On December 4, 1984 it became the first telescope to make optical closure phase measurements on an astronomical source using an aperture mask.

UH88 is a Cassegrain reflector tube telescope with an f/10 focal ratio, supported by a large open fork equatorial mount. It was the last telescope on Mauna Kea to use a tube design rather than an open truss, and is the largest in the complex to use an open fork mount, with neighboring telescopes in the 3-meter class using English mount designs.

As the only research telescope controlled solely by the University, UH88 has long been the primary telescope used by its professors, postdoctoral scholars, and graduate students, and, as a result, the site of numerous discoveries. David C. Jewitt and Jane X. Luu discovered the first Kuiper belt object, 15760 Albion, using UH88, and a team led by Jewitt and Scott S. Sheppard discovered 45 of the known moons of Jupiter, as well as moons of Saturn, Uranus and Neptune.

The Institute for Astronomy also makes agreements with other organizations for portions of available observing time. Currently, the National Astronomical Observatory of Japan uses UH88 for some research projects for which its far larger and more expensive Subaru Observatory, also on Mauna Kea, would be overkill. The Nearby Supernova Factory project, based at Lawrence Berkeley National Laboratory, also has its Supernova Integrated Field Spectrograph (SNIFS) instrument mounted on UH88.

In June 2011, the telescope and its weather station were struck by lightning, damaging many systems and disabling it, but the telescope was repaired by August 2011. Some of the systems at the observatory were 41 years old at the time of the damage and had to be reverse engineered to be fixed. The weather station is currently under development.

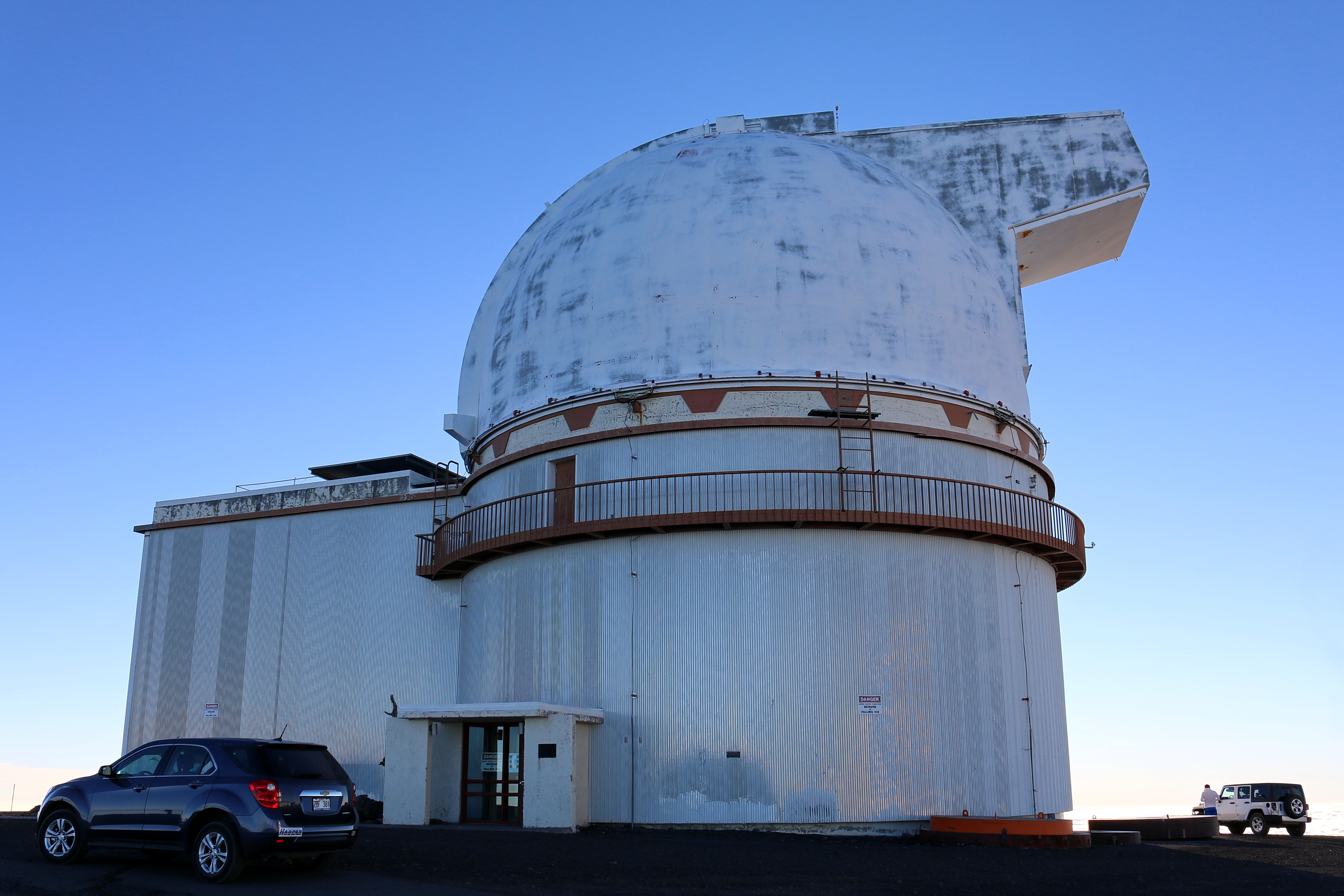
Telescope building

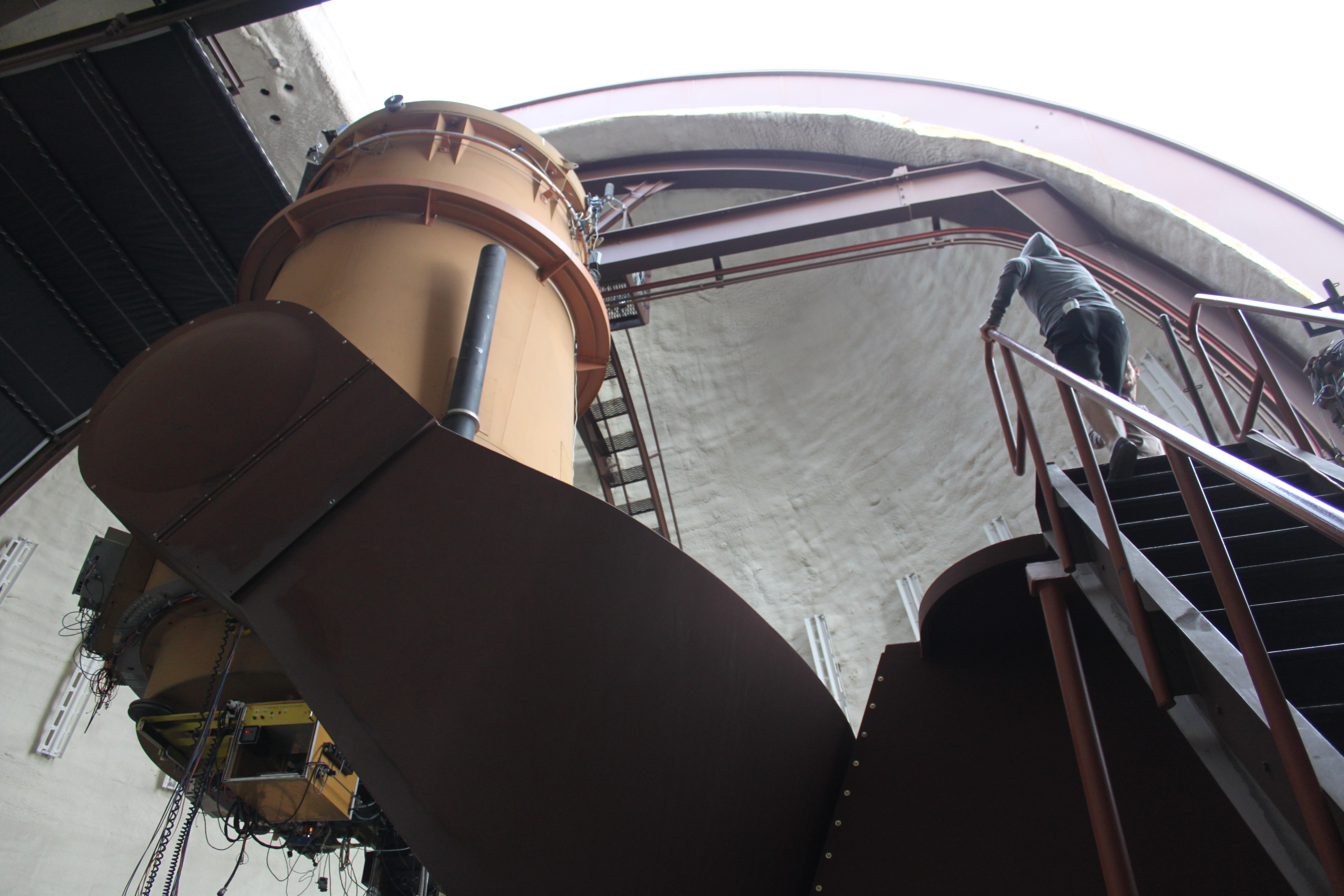
A view inside the dome, showing the telescope and its equatorial mount

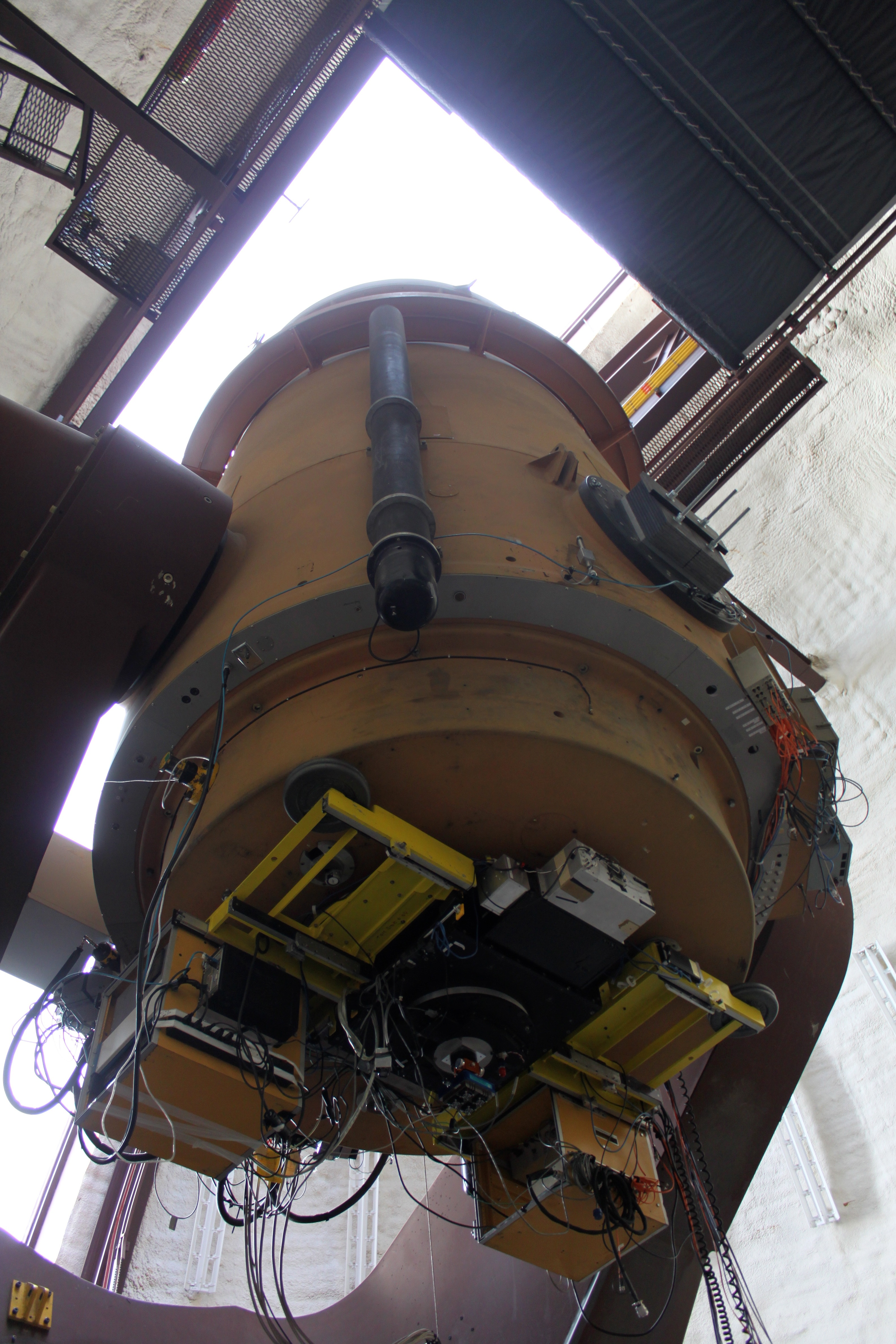
Hardware mounted on the bottom of the telescope tube

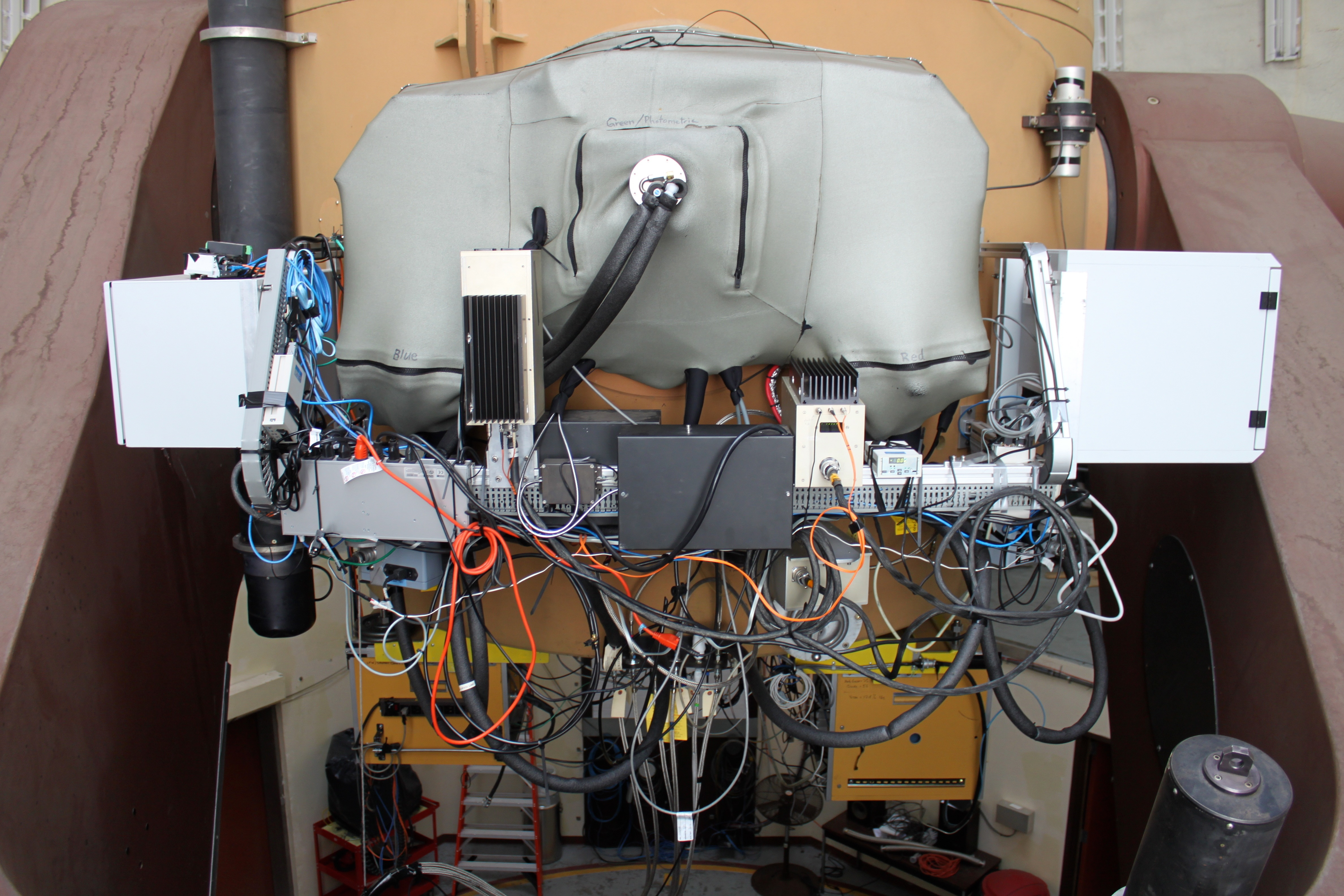
Hardware mounted on the side of the telescope tube

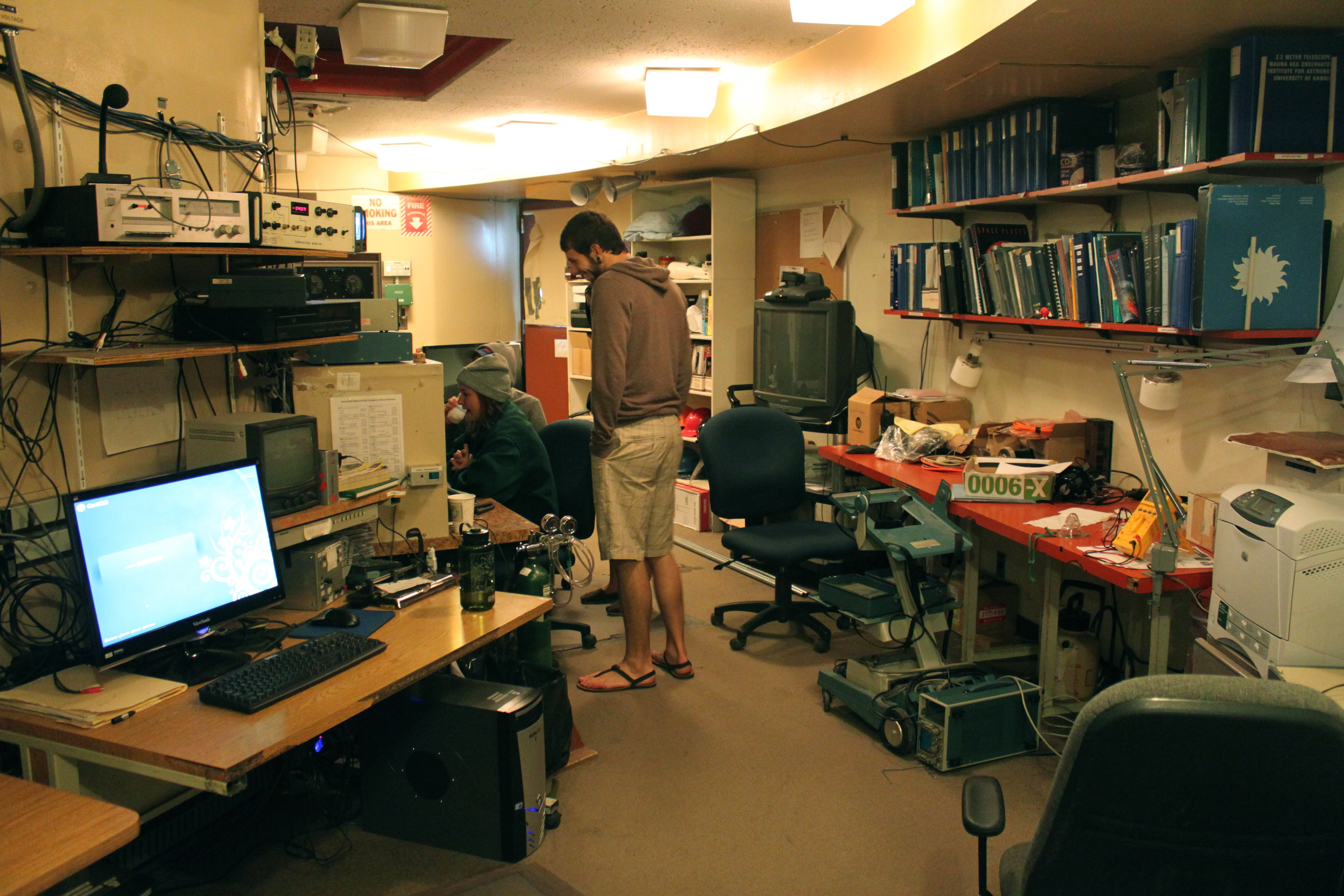
Control room

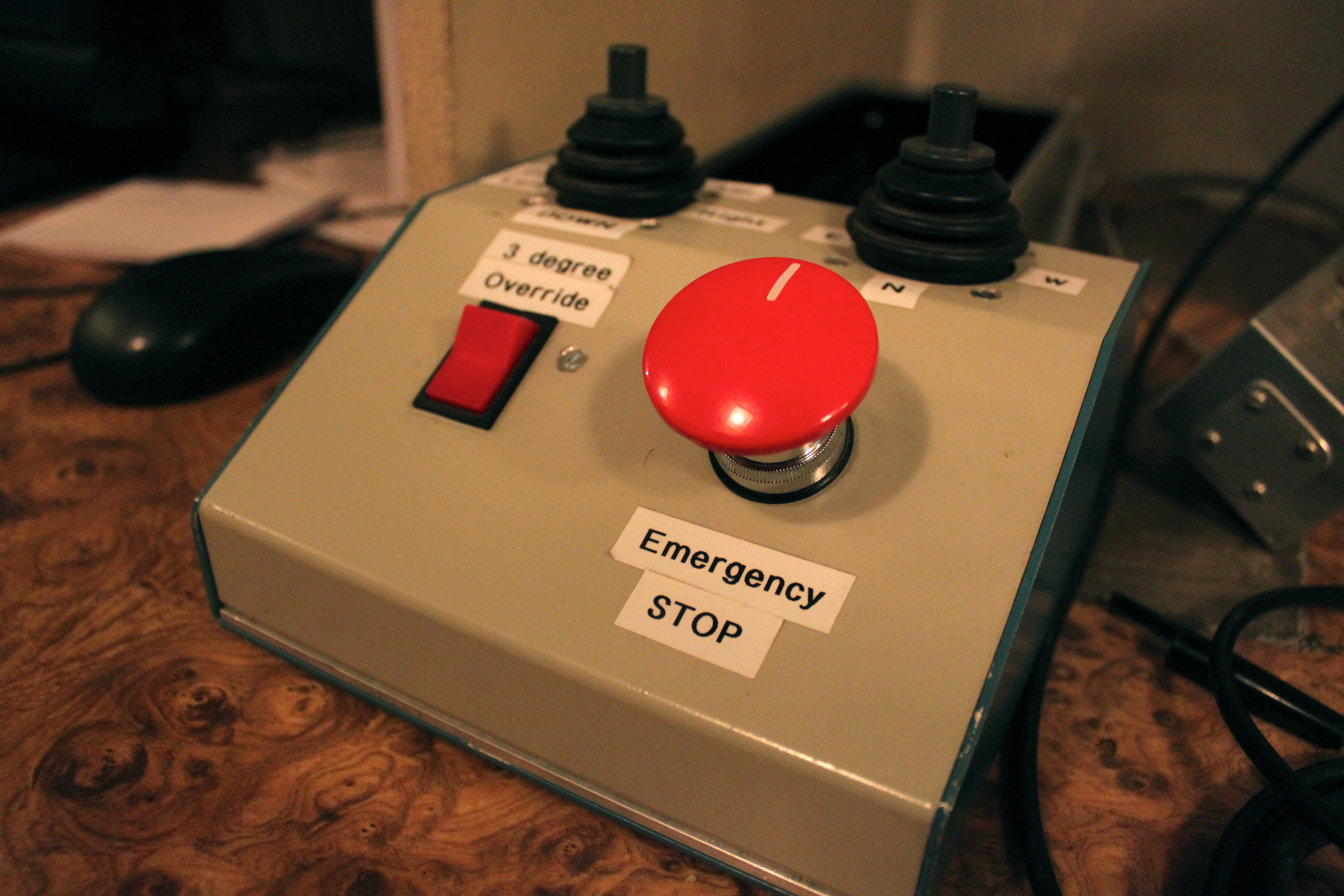
Control box, which appears to be for manually aiming the telescope

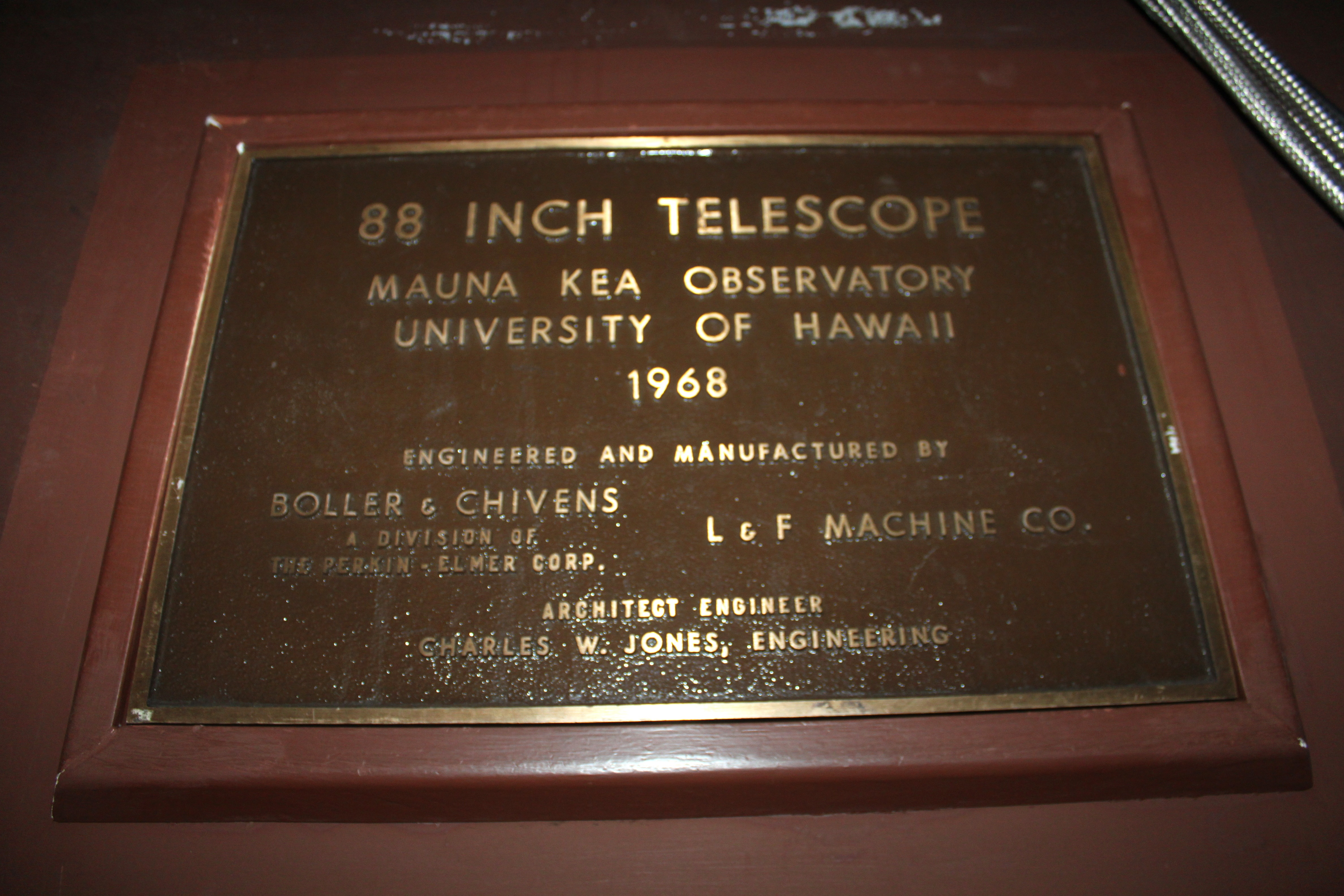
Commemorative plaque for the telescope

== See also ==
- List of largest optical telescopes in the 20th century
