= Premios Nacionales del Deporte =

Spanish sports award

Premios Nacionales del Deporte (National Sports Awards) are annual sporting awards given to best Spanish athletes. They are awarded by Consejo Superior de Deportes (CSD) and sponsored by the Spanish royal family.

The awards were established in 1982 and are always presented to award achievements in the preceding calendar year. There are fourteen categories, of which the two most prestigious are the Premio Reina Letizia for Best Spanish Sportswoman and the Premio Rey Felipe for Best Spanish Sportsman. Two other key categories are the Premio Princesa Leonor, presented to the best male or female athlete under 18, and the Premio Infanta Sofía, which recognizes sporting participation and achievement among people with disabilities.

== List of winners ==
Year	Sportsman of the Year		Sportswoman of the Year	
Year	Winner	Sport	Winner	Sport
1982	José Marín	Athletics	Marta Figueras-Dotti	Golf
1983	Juan Antonio Corbalán	Basketball	Blanca Fernández Ochoa	Skiing
1984	José Manuel Abascal	Athletics	Marta Bobo	Gymnastics
1985	José Amengual	Spearfishing	Theresa Zabell	Sailing
1986	José Luis González	Athletics	Mari Cruz Díaz	Athletics
1987	Jorge Martínez	Motorsport	Coral Bistuer	Taekwondo
1988	José Doreste	Sailing	Blanca Fernández Ochoa	Skiing
1989	Manuel Pereira	Fencing	Ana Bautista Reyes	Gymnastics
1990	Carlos Sainz	Motorsport	Sandra Myers	Athletics
1991	Martin López-Zubero	Swimming	Miriam Blasco	Judo
1992	Miguel Indurain	Cycling	Miriam Blasco and Almudena Muñoz	Judo
1993	Jesús Ángel García and Valentí Massana	Athletics	Carmen Acedo	Gymnastics
1994	José María Olazábal	Golf	Arantxa Sánchez Vicario and Conchita Martínez	Tennis
1995	Miguel Indurain	Cycling	Taymi Chappé	Fencing
1996	Fermín Cacho	Athletics	Theresa Zabell and Begoña Vía-Dufresne	Sailing
1997	Joan Llaneras	Cycling	Isabel Fernández	Judo
1998	Àlex Corretja	Tennis	Dori Ruano	Cycling
1999	Abel Antón	Athletics	Niurka Montalvo	Athletics
2000	Joan Llaneras and Gervasio Deferr	Cycling; Gymnastics	Isabel Fernández	Judo
2001	Pau Gasol	Basketball	Sheila Herrero	Speed skating
2002	Alberto García	Athletics	Marta Domínguez	Athletics
2003	Juan Carlos Ferrero	Tennis	Joane Somarriba	Cycling
2004	David Cal	Canoeing	Beatriz Ferrer-Salat	Equestrian
2005	Fernando Alonso	Motorsport	Gemma Mengual	Swimming
2006	Rafael Nadal	Tennis	Laia Sanz	Motorsport
2007	Rafael Trujillo	Sailing	Mayte Martínez	Athletics
2008	Rafael Nadal	Tennis	Virginia Ruano Pascual and Anabel Medina Garrigues	Tennis
2009	Xavi Hernández	Football	Marta Domínguez	Athletics
2010	Jorge Lorenzo	Motorsport	Edurne Pasaban	Mountaineering
2011	Juan Carlos Navarro	Basketball	Tara Pacheco and Berta Betanzos	Sailing
2012	Joel González	Taekwondo	Marina Alabau	Sailing
2013	Javier Gómez Noya	Triathlon	Mireia Belmonte	Swimming
2014	Marc Márquez	Motorsport	Carolina Marín	Badminton
2015	Javier Fernández	Figure skating	Ruth Beitia	Athletics
2016	Saúl Craviotto	Canoeing	Maialen Chourraut and Lydia Valentín	Canoeing; Weightlifting
2017	Rafael Nadal	Tennis	Sandra Sánchez	Karate
2018	Regino Hernández and Alejandro Valverde	Snowboarding; Cycling	Joana Pastrana	Boxing
2019	Ricky Rubio	Basketball	Clàudia Galicia	Cycling and Skiing
2020	Sportspeople who fought against COVID-19 from their positions on the front line (Extraordinary Award)			
2021	Jon Rahm	Golf	Alexia Putellas	Football
2022	Carlos Alcaraz	Tennis	Susana Rodríguez	Athletics
2023	Rodri Hernández	Football	Aitana Bonmatí	Football
2024	Álvaro Martín	Athletics	María Pérez	Athletics
2025	Marc Márquez	Motorsport	Iris Tió	Swimming
