= Gregory Scott Aldering =

American astronomer

Minor planets discovered: 4
9004 Peekaydee	October 22, 1982	MPC
(17398) 1982 UR_{2}	October 20, 1982	MPC
(19951) 1982 UW_{2}	October 20, 1982	MPC
(100001) 1982 UC_{3}	October 20, 1982	MPC

Gregory Scott Aldering (born 1960), also known simply as Greg Aldering is an American astronomer, discoverer of minor planets and supernovae, currently with the University of California, Lawrence Berkeley Laboratory.

As a high school student in Bridgeport, Michigan, he was an avid amateur astronomer and showed a particular aptitude for scientific studies in his studies of variable stars. Currently, his interests center on cosmology, including measurement of the cosmological parameters, the exploration of the nature of the "dark energy" and the large-scale distribution of matter in the universe. His current cosmological studies focus on the use of Type Ia supernovae as tools for determining the cosmological parameters, through his participation in the Supernova Cosmology Project. He is now the primary investigator of the Nearby Supernova Factory experiment, and is also a co-investigator on the Supernova/Acceleration Probe.

While an undergraduate student at the Massachusetts Institute of Technology (1979–1983), he discovered four asteroids at Kitt Peak National Observatory (695), as credited by the Minor Planet Center. He has so far classified some 266 supernovae, and is one of the co-discoverers of SN 2002bk.

The minor main-belt asteroid 26533 Aldering was named in his honor.
