= Pilar Manjón =

Spanish activist

Pilar Manjon
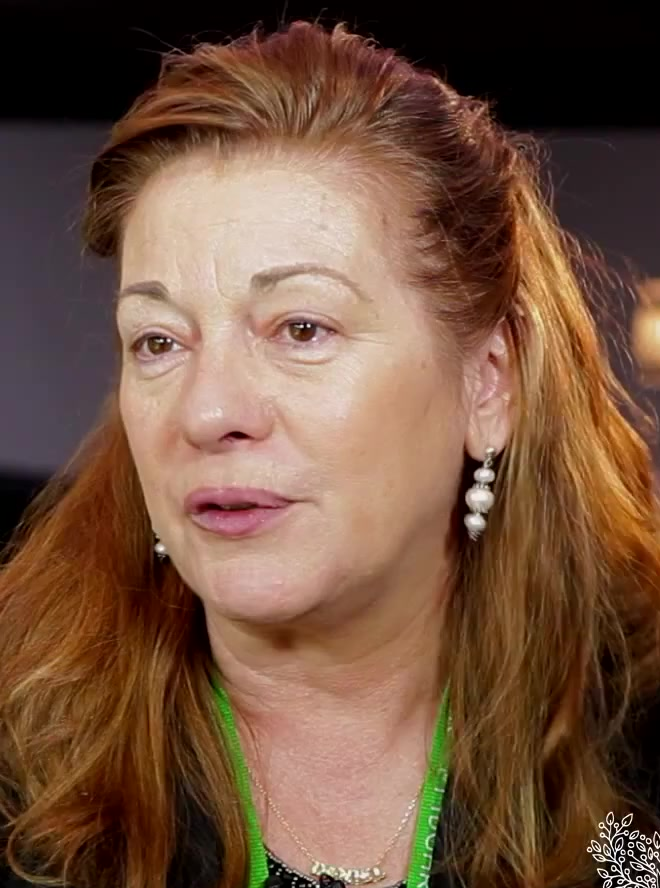
- Manjón in 2014
- Born: 1958 (age 67–68); Plasencia
- Occupation: Spanish activist

Pilar Manjón (born 1958) is the president of the Asociación 11-M Afectados del Terrorismo (Association for the victims of 11-M).

== Biography ==
Manjón was born in Plasencia, Cáceres Province. She is a civil servant and has been a member of the Madrid chapter of the labour union Comisiones Obreras since 1978.

Her son, Daniel Paz Manjón, died in the Madrid 11-M attacks.

== Presidency of the Asociación 11-M Afectados del Terrorismo ==
Pilar Manjón is the current president of the Asociación 11-M Afectados del Terrorismo. She has been president of this association since 2005, following the resignation of the prior president and the subsequent appointment of an interim caretaker in November 2004. She has been publicly critical of the way some Spanish politicians have used the 11 March terrorist attacks for their own ends and has assigned responsibility for the attacks to the government of José María Aznar. In her opinion, the Muslim terrorists chose to attack Madrid because of the Aznar government's support of the Iraq War, support which had actively begun one year before the attacks took place.

Manjón became famous because of her participation in the Comisión del Investigación del 11-M (the congressional committee investigating the 11-M attacks), which caused a furor in Spain: "I'm arriving at serious conclusions. I think something could have been done to avoid these attacks." She has also requested that no further images of those killed and injured in those tragic events be disseminated.

== The Documentary "Un Largo Invierno" ==
In 2010 Manjón starred in the documentary "Un Largo Invierno," directed by Sebastián Arabia. The documentary exposes the precarious state in which some of the victims of the 11-M terrorist attacks live. It also offers an analysis of the six years that have passed since the bombings, with the effects of the much-mooted conspiracy theory (teoría de la conspiración) taking on a weighty role. Manjón denounces a campaign of bullying and harassment directed against herself and members of her association, given the large quantity of death threats received by them (for this reason, the police chiefs were obliged to provide Manjón with an escort). Whether it is due to Manjón's words or the offscreen narrative which Arabia inserts at certain moments of the film, the work as a whole is highly critical of many of the actions and positions taken by the Partido Popular political party with regards to the 11-M attacks. The film also criticizes the government of José María Aznar, which is accused of being the cause of the bombings thanks to its support of, and participation in, the Iraq War. In some places, the film also denounces the Zapatero government (2004–2011) for having abandoned the 11-M victims.

The film's producer offered the documentary free of charge on Internet for four weeks and, according to data provided by that same producer, the documentary was viewed by 70,000 people.

== Supposedly Racist Comments ==
On August 1, 2014, Pilar Manjón used her Twitter account to harshly criticize the President of the United States, Barack Obama, and his wife, Michelle Obama, because, according to her, they were not trying to completely and permanently halt the military campaign that Israel was undertaking against the inhabitants of Gaza. Specifically, she said, "I hate the black man in the White House. I love the murdered children of Gaza. I want that (abbreviated epithet) of a woman to take down the video of those kidnapped girls." The fact that she used the words "hate" and "black" generated considerable scandal, as they were considered racist. The President's wife, Michelle Obama, was also criticized for her participation in the "Bring Back Our Girls" campaign since it appears that Manjón considered there to exist an implicit hypocrisy in defending the girls who were kidnapped by Boko Haram while keeping silent regarding the attacks in Gaza. At that time there were over 1,400 Palestinian deaths and 8,000 Palestinian injured in the 24 days of the Israeli military operation in the Gaza strip, called "Operation Protective Edge," which according to some sources constituted genocide and generated international condemnation against the acts of the state of Israel.
