= Supernova Cosmology Project =

Cosmology group

The Supernova Cosmology Project is one of two research teams that determined the likelihood of an accelerating universe and therefore a positive cosmological constant, using data from the redshift of Type Ia supernovae. The project is headed by Saul Perlmutter at Lawrence Berkeley National Laboratory, with members from Australia, Chile, France, Portugal, Spain, Sweden, the United Kingdom, and the United States.

This discovery was named "Breakthrough of the Year for 1998" by Science Magazine and, along with the High-Z Supernova Search Team, the project team won the 2007 Gruber Prize in Cosmology and the 2015 Breakthrough Prize in Fundamental Physics. In 2011, Perlmutter was awarded the Nobel Prize in Physics for this work, alongside Adam Riess and Brian P. Schmidt from the High-Z team.

== Findings ==
Both the Super Cosmology Project and the High-Z Supernova Search Team, another team who was doing the same research, expected to find that the universe is either expanding then contracting as one way to explain the expanding universe idea or the universe must be expanding at a slow rate that will slow over time. However, in January 1998, the Supernova Cosmology project presented evidence that the expansion of the universe is not slowing at all and is in reality accelerating, citing Einstein's previously dismissed cosmological constant, Λ, which potentially includes up to 70% of the universe's total mass-energy density.

== Theory validation ==
In order to determine what was happening to the universe, the researchers had to measure the speed of astronomical objects that are travelling away from us as well as how far away these objects actually are. In order to do any of this, the researchers had to find a standard light source that was bright enough to be seen with our telescopes due to the large distances away these objects would be. They chose to use Type Ia Supernovae, exploding stars, as their standard light source.

== Methods ==
Type Ia supernovae are very bright standard candles, which makes it possible to calculate their distance to earth from the observed luminosity. Type Ia supernovae are rare in most galaxies, only occurring about two or three times in a thousand years. Before the Supernova Cosmology Project, it was difficult to find supernovae due to lesser telescopes. However, by scanning the night sky over individual periods of three weeks astronomers were able to find up to two dozen per session, giving them enough supernovae observations to conduct their study.

== Project members ==
The team members are:

- Saul Perlmutter, Lawrence Berkeley National Laboratory
- Gregory Aldering, Lawrence Berkeley National Laboratory
- Brian J. Boyle, Australia Telescope National Facility
- Shane Burns, Colorado College
- Patricia G. Castro, Instituto Superior Técnico, Lisbon
- Warrick Couch, Swinburne University of Technology
- Susana Deustua, American Astronomical Society
- Richard Ellis, California Institute of Technology
- Sebastien Fabbro, Instituto Superior Técnico, Lisbon
- Alexei Filippenko, University of California, Berkeley (later a member of the High-Z Supernova Search Team)
- Andrew Fruchter, Space Telescope Science Institute
- Gerson Goldhaber, Lawrence Berkeley National Laboratory
- Ariel Goobar, Stockholm University
- Donald Groom, Lawrence Berkeley National Laboratory
- Isobel Hook, University of Oxford
- Mike Irwin, University of Cambridge
- Alex Kim, Lawrence Berkeley National Laboratory
- Matthew Kim
- Robert Knop, Vanderbilt University
- Julia C. Lee, Harvard University
- Chris Lidman, European Southern Observatory
- Thomas Matheson, NOAO Gemini Science Center
- Richard McMahon, University of Cambridge
- Richard Muller, University of California, Berkeley
- Heidi Newberg, Rensselaer Polytechnic Institute
- Peter Nugent, Lawrence Berkeley National Laboratory
- Nelson Nunes, University of Cambridge
- Reynald Pain, CNRS-IN2P3, Paris
- Nino Panagia, Space Telescope Science Institute
- Carl Pennypacker, University of California, Berkeley
- Robert Quimby, The University of Texas
- Pilar Ruiz-Lapuente, University of Barcelona
- Bradley E. Schaefer, Louisiana State University
- Nicholas Walton, University of Cambridge
