= Sheila Herrero Lapuente =

Spanish speed skater (born 1976)

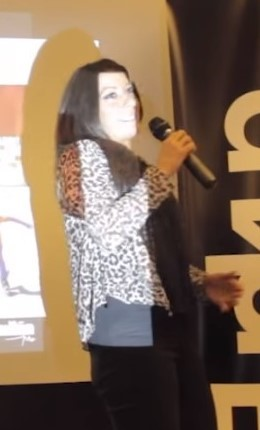
Sheila Herrero Lapuente 2016

Sheila Herrero Lapuente (born 28 June 1976, Zaragoza, Aragón, Spain) is an inline speed skater.

She won 15 gold medals on World Championships, 36 on European, 88 on Spanish and 4 world records on several distances. She began on Zaragoza's Domingo Miral club. During 1999 and 2000 moved to Roces (Italy) and in 2001 and 2002 to Verducci (USA). She retired in 2003.

Awards
Preceded by Isabel Fernández	Spanish Sportswoman of the Year; 2001	Succeeded by Marta Domínguez
