= Pilar Espuña i Domènech =

Spanish labor and feminist activist

- Born: 19 June 1928; Barcelona
- Died: 6 May 2010 (aged 81); Barcelona
- Occupations: Labor and feminist activist
- Children: 1

Pilar Espuña i Domènech (1928–2010) (in Spanish: Pilar Espuña Domènech) was a Spanish-Catalan bank worker known primarily for her labor and feminist activism. She became the first woman elected president of the workers' syndicate group Hermandad Obrera de Acción Católica in Barcelona and was reelected a decade later.

== Biography ==
Espuña was born in Barcelona on 19 June 1928, in the neighborhood of Vilapicina and Torre Llobeta. Her father was a railway worker from Escalona (Huesca), and her mother came from Manlleu (Barcelona). When she was 16, Espuña took a job at the banking company Banco Español de Crédito and retired from the bank in 1988. Her employment there was interrupted only when she was married 1952, but she was rehired when she soon became widowed, raising a small son.

In 1966, Espuña began her community activities in earnest. She became part of the Banking Coordinator and was active in the assembly movement. During that year, she joined the workers' syndicate group Hermandad Obrera de Acción Católica (HOAC) (in English, Catholic Action). She was elected by her coworkers as a banking union liaison, and from that time on, she remained committed to defending the rights of her fellow bank workers. During that year, she also joined the feminist movement. The next year, she assumed diocesan responsibility for the dissemination of the HOAC. In 1969, she was the first woman elected president of the HOAC of Barcelona, and she was elected to that position again in the early 1980s.

To support workers' rights, she refused to work overtime, promoted awareness of discrimination against women, and protested in support of laborers, all of which caused many problems for her at the bank.

In 1972, she became the regional head of the Catholic Jesus-Caritas Fraternity in Catalonia. When the Spanish dictatorship of Francisco Franco ended, she began working with the clandestine political group UCL (Communist Liberation Union), an anti-fascist group. In 1983, she joined the MCC (Communist Movement of Catalonia) and when it merged with the Revolutionary Communist League, she joined the new party called Revolta.

In 1987, Espuña was the founder and chair of the Women and Prison group, part of the feminist movement, and committed her efforts to fighting to improve the living conditions of incarcerated women. She wrote two books Una vídua obrera (A Working-Class Widow) and Quan les dones se senten creients i feministes (When Women See Themselves as Believers and Feminists).

She also served as a coordinator of the Women's Council of the Can Basté Civic Center and a member of the Association of Neighbors of Turó de la Peira.

Pilar Espuña died on 6 May 2010 at 81 in Barcelona.

== Archives ==
On 7 July 1982, her personal archival collection was donated to the National Archives of Catalonia. The collection contains documentation generated by Espuña from her political and community activity, primarily those related to the labor movement and with various union organizations (UGT, USO, CCOO, CNT) linked to the banking sector, including union elections, conventions, agreements, brochures and other publications. Also, included is documentation related to popular opposition to Francoism, from different political parties (PSUC, MCC, PCC, Esquerra Comunista), from religious associations (Fraternitat Jesús-Caritas and Hermandad Obrera de Acción Católica) and from social opposition movements (women's groups, neighborhood associations from different Barcelona neighborhoods). In addition, the archive preserves many periodicals about religious or labor issues.

== Tributes ==
- In 2001, she was honored with a street plaque and a tribute from the Turó de la Peira Neighborhood Association in recognition of her "militant career."
- In March 2021, gardens were named after her in the Turó de la Peira neighborhood, between Sant Iscle and Pi i Molist streets, where she lived her adult life. The gardens were opened in June 2022.
