= Pilar Alcaide =

Spanish cardiac biologist and immunologist

- Born: Guadalajara, Spain
- Education: Universidad Autonoma de Madrid, Spain (MS, PhD)
- Scientific career
- Fields: Cardiovascular biology, immunology
- Institutions: Tufts University School of Medicine
- Website: https://gsbs.tufts.edu/faculty-research/pilar-alcaide-lab

Pilar Alcaide is a Spanish-born cardiac biologist and immunologist at the Tufts University School of Medicine. She is Kenneth and JoAnn G. Wellner Professor and Assistant Dean of Faculty Development.

== Life and career ==
Alcaide spent her early life in Madrid, Spain, though was born in Guadalajara. She remained in Madrid for college and graduate school, completing an M.S. from the Universidad Autonoma de Madrid in 1998, and received her PhD from the same institution in 2003.

Alcaide then undertook postdoctoral research at Brigham and Women's Hospital and Harvard Medical School as part of a Fulbright scholarship. She continued her research at Harvard Medical School as an instructor of pathology, having been awarded an NIH K99 Pathway to Independence grant. In 2011, she joined the faculty of the Tufts University School of Medicine as an assistant professor. Alcaide was promoted to associate professor in 2016, full professor in 2023, and in 2019 was also named to the Kenneth and JoAnn G. Wellner professorship. Since 2020 she has served as Program Director of the Tufts University Graduate School of Biomedical Science immunology program, and since 2021 has been Assistant Dean of Faculty Development.

== Research ==
Alcaide's lab researches interactions between the immune and cardiovascular systems, with particular focuses on cardiac T-cells and the immune response to heart failure.

One recent project from Alcaide's group examined how T-cell recruitment to the heart following heart failure affected the progression of heart failure pathogenesis. They found that a specific population of T-cells responds to the heart following nonischemic heart failure, and that these immune cells drive cardiac fibrosis, in turn negatively affecting heart function following injury.

Another research area that Alcaide's lab is investigating is how the immune response to doxorubicin, a common chemotherapy drug, can lead to negative cardiac outcomes (heart failure and/or cardiomyopathy). A collaboration with Junjie Xiao's research group found exercise protected against cardiotoxicity by affecting B-cell activation. Separately, Alcaide's group found that CD8^{+} T cells drive cardiac inflammation following doxorubicin treatment which leads to cardiac fibrosis and other negative outcomes.

== Honors and awards ==
- ASIP Cotran Early Career Investigator Award
- Fellow of the American Heart Association
