= Pilar Ruiz-Lapuente =

Spanish astronomer (born 1964)

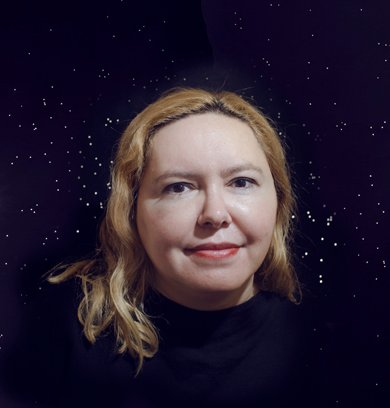
- Ruiz-Lapuente in 2013
- Born: 18 May 1964; Barcelona, Spain
- Education: University of Barcelona; Max Planck Institute for Astrophysics European Southern Observatory
- Known for: Study of astronomy

Pilar Ruiz-Lapuente (born 1964, Barcelona) is an astrophysicist working as a professor at the University of Barcelona. Her work has included research on type Ia supernovae. In 2004, she led the team that searched for the companion star to the white dwarf that became supernova SN 1572, observed by Tycho Brahe, among others. Ruiz-Lapuente's research on supernovae contributed to the discovery of the accelerating expansion of the universe.

== Career overview ==
Ruiz-Lapuente completed her degree in Physics at the University of Barcelona, then did her doctoral studies at the University of Barcelona, the Max Planck Institute for Astrophysics, and the European Southern Observatory. She then went on to become a research fellow at the Center for Astrophysics | Harvard & Smithsonian. As of 2012, she was a professor with the Department of Astronomy and Meteorology at the University of Barcelona.

== Research on accelerating universe ==
Ruiz-Lapuente was one of the members of the Supernova Cosmology Project, one of two research teams which made the unexpected co-discovery, in 1998, that the universe was expanding at an accelerating rate. The teams discovered this by studying Type Ia supernovae and posited dark energy as an explanation for this accelerating expansion.

She said of her contribution to the work...

I worked in La Palma with the telescopes of Roque de los Muchachos Observatory (Canary Islands). I monitored the objects that were discovered from which I obtained their spectra and light curves. On the other hand, I also helped to perform the team’s joint analyses...We carry out observations every fifteen days. First, we take reference images and then we go back to them after around fifteen days, when we expect to find some new ones. Hence, we can compare images, detect variable objects and identify them as supernovae. Once they’ve been detected, we monitor them.

As a result of this discovery, Ruiz-Lapuente, along with her colleagues on the Supernova Cosmology Project and the co-discoverers on the High-z Supernova Search Team, received the 2007 Gruber Prize in Cosmology and the 2015 Breakthrough Prize in Fundamental Physics. The research she contributed to also resulted in the awarding of a Nobel Prize to her team's lead researcher, Saul Perlmutter, which he shared with the High-z Supernova Search Team's directors.

== Notable publications ==
As of 2012, Pilar-Ruiz had authored more than 130 journal articles. These include works published in Nature and in Science.

Some articles include :

- Nebular spectra of type IA supernovae as probes for extragalactic distances, reddening, and nucleosynthesis Bibcode:1992ApJ...400..127R
- A possible low-mass type Ia supernova doi:10.1038/365728a0
- Tycho Brahe's supernova: light from centuries past doi:10.1086/422419 Bibcode:2004ApJ...612..357R arXiv:astro-ph/0309009
- Dark energy, gravitation and supernovae doi:10.1088/0264-9381/24/11/R01 Bibcode:2007CQGra..24R..91R arXiv:0704.1058

She has also written a book titled "El enigma de la realidad. Las entidades de la física de Aristóteles a Einstein."
